= 2004 Washington State Senate election =

- November 2, 2004

28 seats of the Washington State Senate 25 seats needed for a majority
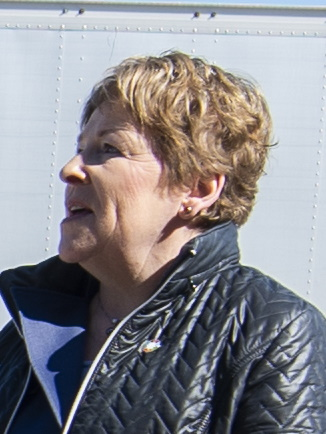

	Majority party	Minority party
Leader	Lisa Brown	Bill Finkbeiner
Party	Democratic	Republican
Leader's seat	3rd-Spokane	45th-Carnation
Last election	24	25
Seats after	26	23
Seat change	▲2	▼2
- Results: Democratic gain Democratic hold Republican hold No election
Majority Leader before election
Bill Finkbeiner
Republican
Elected Majority Leader
Lisa Brown
Democratic

The 2004 Washington State Senate election was held on November 2, 2004, in which about half of the state's 49 legislative districts choose a state senator for a four-year term to the Washington State Senate. The other half of state senators are chosen in the next biennial election, so that about half of the senators, along with all the members of the Washington State House of Representatives, are elected every two years.

Twenty-four seats were up for their regular election this cycle, while four seats held special elections due to resignations by their incumbents, for a total of 28 seats on the ballot. Republicans held 15 of the seats and Democrats held the remaining 13. Democrats successfully flipped two seats in the general election.

== Predictions ==
Source	Ranking	As of
Rothenberg	Tossup	October 1, 2004

== Summary of results ==
State Senate District	Incumbent	Party	Elected Senator	Party
1st	Rosemary McAuliffe	Dem	Rosemary McAuliffe	Dem
2nd	Marilyn Rasmussen	Dem	Marilyn Rasmussen	Dem
3rd	Lisa Brown	Dem	Lisa Brown	Dem
4th	Bob McCaslin Sr.	Rep	Bob McCaslin Sr.	Rep
5th	Dino Rossi	Rep	Cheryl Pflug	Rep
6th	James E. West	Rep	Brad Benson	Rep
8th	Patricia S. Hale	Rep	Jerome Delvin	Rep
9th	Larry Sheahan	Rep	Mark G. Schoesler	Rep
10th	Mary Margaret Haugen	Dem	Mary Margaret Haugen	Dem
11th	Margarita Prentice	Dem	Margarita Prentice	Dem
12th	Linda Evans Parlette	Rep	Linda Evans Parlette	Rep
14th	Alex Deccio	Rep	Alex Deccio	Rep
16th	Mike Hewitt	Rep	Mike Hewitt	Rep
17th	Don Benton	Rep	Don Benton	Rep
18th	Joseph Zarelli	Rep	Joseph Zarelli	Rep
19th	Mark L. Doumit	Dem	Mark L. Doumit	Dem
20th	Dan Swecker	Rep	Dan Swecker	Rep
22nd	Karen Fraser	Dem	Karen Fraser	Dem
23rd	Betti Sheldon	Dem	Phil Rockefeller	Dem
24th	Jim Hargrove	Dem	Jim Hargrove	Dem
25th	Jim Kastama	Dem	Jim Kastama	Dem
27th	Debbie Regala	Dem	Debbie Regala	Dem
28th	Shirley Winsley	Rep	Mike Carrell	Rep
38th	Aaron Reardon	Dem	Jean Berkey	Dem
39th	Val Stevens	Rep	Val Stevens	Rep
40th	Harriet A. Spanel	Dem	Harriet A. Spanel	Dem
41st	Jim Horn	Rep	Brian Weinstein	Dem
49th	Don Carlson	Rep	Craig Pridemore	Dem

== Detailed results ==
The 2004 election utilized an open primary system. Primary results can be found here and general election results can be found here.

=== District 1 ===
Washington's 1st legislative district State Senate Election, 2004
Primary election
Party	Candidate	Votes	%
Democratic	Rosemary McAuliffe	14,564	62.34
Republican	Jason Bontrager	8,798	37.66
Total votes		23,362	100
General election
Democratic	Rosemary McAuliffe	33,389	56.96
Republican	Jason Bontrager	25,229	43.04
Total votes		58,618	100
Democratic hold			

=== District 2 ===
Washington's 2nd legislative district State Senate Election, 2004
Primary election
Party	Candidate	Votes	%
Democratic	Marilyn Rasmussen	11,243	54.64
Republican	Deryl McCarty	9,334	45.36
Total votes		20,557	100
General election
Democratic	Marilyn Rasmussen	28,395	52.75
Republican	Deryl McCarty	25,438	47.25
Total votes		53,833	100
Democratic hold			

=== District 3 ===
Washington's 3rd legislative district State Senate Election, 2004
Primary election
Party	Candidate	Votes	%
Democratic	Lisa Brown	11,679	63.55
Republican	Mike Casey	6,698	36.45
Total votes		18,377	100
General election
Democratic	Lisa Brown	25,930	62.37
Republican	Mike Casey	15,647	37.63
Total votes		41,577	100
Democratic hold			

=== District 4 ===
Washington's 4th legislative district State Senate Election, 2004
Primary election
Party	Candidate	Votes	%
Republican	Bob McCaslin	15,048	59.47
Democratic	Tim Hattenburg	10,254	40.53
Total votes		25,302	100
General election
Republican	Bob McCaslin	34,447	59.51
Democratic	Tim Hattenburg	23,437	40.49
Total votes		57,884	100
Republican hold			

=== District 5 ===
Washington's 5th legislative district State Senate Election, 2004
Primary election
Party	Candidate	Votes	%
Republican	Cheryl Pflug	13,080	49.52
Democratic	Kathy Huckabay	12,973	49.11
Libertarian	Jaime Capili	363	1.37
Total votes		26,416	100
General election
Republican	Cheryl Pflug	38,186	57.88
Democratic	Kathy Huckabay	26,457	40.10
Libertarian	Jaime Capili	1,327	2.01
Total votes		65,970	100
Republican hold			

=== District 6 ===
Washington's 6th legislative district State Senate Election, 2004
Primary election
Party	Candidate	Votes	%
Democratic	Laurie Dolan	14,690	44.58
Republican	Brad Benson	9,439	28.65
Republican	Brian Murray	8,820	26.77
Total votes		32,949	100
General election
Republican	Brad Benson	33,312	50.92
Democratic	Laurie Dolan	32,104	49.08
Total votes		65,416	100
Republican hold			

=== District 8 ===
Washington's 7th legislative district State Senate Election, 2004
Primary election
Party	Candidate	Votes	%
Republican	Jerome Delvin	13,869	68.86
Democratic	John David	6,273	31.14
Total votes		20,142	100
General election
Republican	Jerome Delvin	37,360	70.70
Democratic	John David	15,486	29.30
Total votes		52,846	100
Republican hold			

=== District 9 ===
Washington's 9th legislative district State Senate Election, 2004
Primary election
Party	Candidate	Votes	%
Republican	Mark G. Schoesler	13,966	65.65
Democratic	Gail Rowland	7,133	33.53
Libertarian	John Gearhart	176	0.83
Total votes		21,275	100
General election
Republican	Mark G. Schoesler	32,105	66.21
Democratic	Gail Rowland	16,387	33.79
Total votes		48,492	100
Republican hold			

=== District 10 ===
Washington's 10th legislative district State Senate Election, 2004
Primary election
Party	Candidate	Votes	%
Democratic	Mary Margaret Haugen	15,480	56.67
Republican	April Lynne Axthelm	11,512	42.14
Libertarian	Brett Wilhelm	324	1.19
Total votes		27,316	100
General election
Democratic	Mary Margaret Haugen	31,196	50.26
Republican	April Lynne Axthelm	29,219	47.08
Libertarian	Brett Wilhelm	1,653	2.66
Total votes		62,068	100
Democratic hold			

=== District 11 ===
Washington's 11th legislative district State Senate Election, 2004
Primary election
Party	Candidate	Votes	%
Democratic	Margarita Prentice	11,244	72.02
Republican	Bill Roenicke	4,169	26.70
Libertarian	Jennifer Christensen	199	1.27
Total votes		15,612	100
General election
Democratic	Margarita Prentice	25,303	65.25
Republican	Bill Roenicke	10,929	28.18
Libertarian	Jennifer Christensen	2,545	6.56
Total votes		38,777	100
Democratic hold			

=== District 12 ===
Washington's 12th legislative district State Senate Election, 2004
Primary election
Party	Candidate	Votes	%
Republican	Linda Evans Parlette	12,831	100
Total votes		12,831	100
General election
Republican	Linda Evans Parlette	40,620	100
Total votes		40,620	100
Republican hold			

=== District 14 ===
Washington's 14th legislative district State Senate Election, 2004
Primary election
Party	Candidate	Votes	%
Republican	Alex Deccio	11,511	63.64
Democratic	Leni Skarin	6,576	36.36
Total votes		18,087	100
General election
Republican	Alex Deccio	27,534	65.02
Democratic	Leni Skarin	14,811	34.98
Total votes		42,345	100
Republican hold			

=== District 16 ===
Washington's 16th legislative district State Senate Election, 2004
Primary election
Party	Candidate	Votes	%
Republican	Mike Hewitt	12,743	66.02
Democratic	Rebecca Francik	6,560	33.98
Total votes		19,303	100
General election
Republican	Mike Hewitt	29,854	66.84
Democratic	Rebecca Francik	14,807	33.16
Total votes		44,652	100
Republican hold			

=== District 17 ===
Washington's 17th legislative district State Senate Election, 2004
Primary election
Party	Candidate	Votes	%
Republican	Don Benton	8,411	49.63
Democratic	Paul Waadevig	4,387	25.89
Democratic	John T. Davis	4,150	24.49
Total votes		16,948	100
General election
Republican	Don Benton	29,563	56.04
Democratic	Paul Waadevig	23,193	43.96
Total votes		52,756	100
Republican hold			

=== District 18 ===
Washington's 18th legislative district State Senate Election, 2004
Primary election
Party	Candidate	Votes	%
Republican	Joseph Zarelli	10,985	51.44
Democratic	Dave Seabrook	10,372	48.56
Total votes		21,357	100
General election
Republican	Joseph Zarelli	34,706	53.85
Democratic	Dave Seabrook	29,745	46.15
Total votes		64,451	100
Republican hold			

=== District 19 ===
Washington's 19th legislative district State Senate Election, 2004
Primary election
Party	Candidate	Votes	%
Democratic	Mark L. Doumit	13,857	100
Total votes		13,857	100
General election
Democratic	Mark L. Doumit	39,470	100
Total votes		39,470	100
Democratic hold			

=== District 20 ===
Washington's 20th legislative district State Senate Election, 2004
Primary election
Party	Candidate	Votes	%
Republican	Dan Swecker	11,157	55.77
Democratic	Chuck Bojarski	8,850	44.23
Total votes		20,007	100
General election
Republican	Dan Swecker	35,372	64.77
Democratic	Chuck Bojarski	19,238	35.23
Total votes		54,610	100
Republican hold			

=== District 22 ===
Washington's 22nd legislative district State Senate Election, 2004
Primary election
Party	Candidate	Votes	%
Democratic	Karen Fraser	15,389	100
Total votes		15,389	100
General election
Democratic	Karen Fraser	44,695	100
Total votes		44,695	100
Democratic hold			

=== District 23 ===
Washington's 23rd legislative district State Senate Election, 2004
Primary election
Party	Candidate	Votes	%
Democratic	Phil Rockefeller	18,997	63.82
Republican	Doug Kitchens	10,769	36.18
Total votes		29,766	100
General election
Democratic	Phil Rockefeller	25,814	41.66
Republican	Doug Kitchens	25,814	41.66
Total votes		61,964	100
Democratic hold			

=== District 24 ===
Washington's 24th legislative district State Senate Election, 2004
Primary election
Party	Candidate	Votes	%
Democratic	Jim Hargrove	17,357	100
Total votes		17,357	100
General election
Democratic	Jim Hargrove	48,379	100
Total votes		48,379	100
Democratic hold			

=== District 25 ===
Washington's 25th legislative district State Senate Election, 2004
Primary election
Party	Candidate	Votes	%
Democratic	Jim Kastama	13,381	58.21
Republican	Rose Hill	9,607	41.79
Total votes		22,988	100
General election
Democratic	Jim Kastama	30,521	54.36
Republican	Rose Hill	25,622	45.64
Total votes		56,143	100
Democratic hold			

=== District 27 ===
Washington's 27th legislative district State Senate Election, 2004
Primary election
Party	Candidate	Votes	%
Democratic	Debbie Regala	14,414	73.65
Republican	Kim Wheeler	5,157	26.35
Total votes		19,571	100
General election
Democratic	Debbie Regala	32,344	69.95
Republican	Kim Wheeler	13,897	30.05
Total votes		46,241	100
Democratic hold			

=== District 28 ===
Washington's 28th legislative district State Senate Election, 2004
Primary election
Party	Candidate	Votes	%
Democratic	Helen McGovern	12,250	57.19
Republican	Mike Carrell	9,170	42.81
Total votes		21,420	100
General election
Republican	Mike Carrell	25,159	52.35
Democratic	Helen McGovern	22,903	47.65
Total votes		48,062	100
Republican hold			

=== District 38 ===
Washington's 38th legislative district State Senate Election, 2004
Primary election
Party	Candidate	Votes	%
Democratic	Jean Berkey	12,087	68.69
Republican	Tim Hanley	5,510	31.31
Total votes		17,597	100
General election
Democratic	Jean Berkey	28,202	65.34
Republican	Tim Hanley	14,962	34.66
Total votes		43,164	100
Democratic hold			

=== District 39 ===
Washington's 39th legislative district State Senate Election, 2004
Primary election
Party	Candidate	Votes	%
Republican	Val Stevens	9,555	43.89
Democratic	Susanne Olson	8,750	40.19
Democratic	John Painter	3,466	15.92
Total votes		21,771	100
General election
Republican	Val Stevens	29,741	54.19
Democratic	Susanne Olson	25,146	45.81
Total votes		54,887	100
Democratic hold			

=== District 40 ===
Washington's 40th legislative district State Senate Election, 2004
Primary election
Party	Candidate	Votes	%
Democratic	Harriet A. Spanel	16,884	64.39
Republican	Gerald Baron	9,339	35.61
Total votes		26,223	100
General election
Democratic	Harriet A. Spanel	37,573	61.51
Republican	Gerald Baron	23,514	38.49
Total votes		61,087	100
Democratic hold			

=== District 41 ===
Washington's 41st legislative district State Senate Election, 2004
Primary election
Party	Candidate	Votes	%
Democratic	Brian Weinstein	15,475	56.09
Republican	Jim Horn	11,802	42.78
Libertarian	Jim Brown	311	1.13
Total votes		27,588	100
General election
Democratic	Brian Weinstein	32,473	50.88
Republican	Jim Horn	29,984	46.98
Libertarian	Jim Brown	1,371	2.15
Total votes		63,828	100
Democratic gain from Republican			

=== District 49 ===
Washington's 49th legislative district State Senate Election, 2004
Primary election
Party	Candidate	Votes	%
Democratic	Craig Pridemore	9,912	61.08
Republican	Don Carlson	6,316	38.92
Total votes		16,228	100
General election
Democratic	Craig Pridemore	24,470	50.66
Republican	Don Carlson	23,829	49.34
Total votes		48,299	100
Democratic gain from Republican			
