= Brian J. Lewis =

American politician

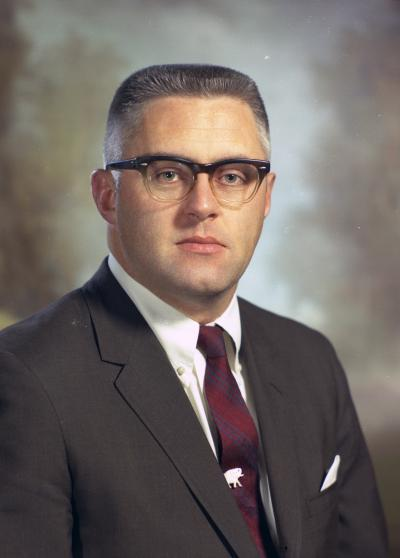
- Lewis in 1969

Member of the Washington Senate from the 41st district
- In office January 13, 1969 – January 8, 1971
- Preceded by: Ernest W. Lennart
- Succeeded by: George W. Clarke

Member of the Washington House of Representatives from the 41st district
- In office January 9, 1967 – January 13, 1969
- Preceded by: Fred A. Veroske
- Succeeded by: Axel C. Julin

Personal details
- Born: September 8, 1929 Essex, England
- Died: September 25, 2001 (aged 72)
- Party: Republican
- Occupation: engineer

Brian J. Lewis (September 8, 1929 – September 25, 2001) was an American politician and engineer in the state of Washington. He served in the Washington House of Representatives and Washington State Senate as a Republican. He was an engineer for Boeing.

Lewis died on September 25, 2001, at the age of 72.
