= George W. Clarke (Washington politician) =

American politician

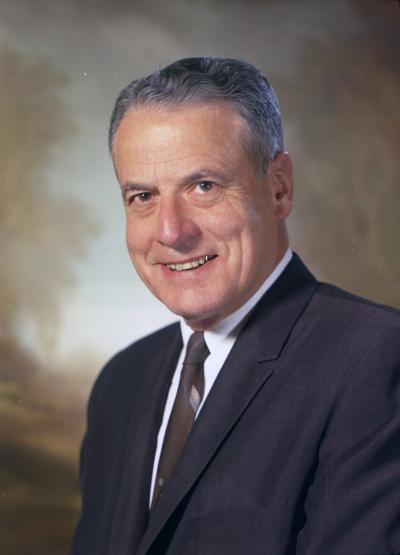
- Clarke in 1967

Member of the Washington Senate from the 41st district
- In office January 11, 1971 – January 14, 1985
- Preceded by: Brian J. Lewis
- Succeeded by: Emilio Cantu

Member of the Washington House of Representatives from the 41st district
- In office January 9, 1967 – January 11, 1971
- Preceded by: Fred A. Veroske
- Succeeded by: William M. Polk

Personal details
- Born: June 22, 1906 Perry, Iowa, U.S.
- Died: June 25, 2006 (aged 100) Bellevue, Washington, U.S.
- Party: Republican
- Spouse: Helen

George W. Clarke (June 22, 1906 – June 25, 2006) was an American politician in the state of Washington.

He was born in Perry, Iowa, on June 22, 1906. Clarke and his family moved to Mercer Island, Washington when he was young. Clarke received his bachelor's degree from University of Washington and his law degree from University of Washington School of Law. He then practiced law. He served in the Washington House of Representatives from 1967 to 1971 and then in the Washington State Senate from 1971 to 1985 as a Republican. He died three days after his 100th birthday on June 25, 2006.
