= Fred O. May =

American politician from Washington State (died 2008)

Member of the Washington House of Representatives from the 41st district
- In office 1985–1993
- Preceded by: Emilio Cantu
- Succeeded by: Jim Horn

Personal details
- Born: Fred Oakley May
- Party: Republican
- Education: University of Oregon (BS); Harvard Business School (MBA)

Fred O. May was an American politician who served as a member of the Washington House of Representatives from 1985 to 1993. He died on October 19, 2008, in Mercer Island, Washington.
