= Judy Clibborn =

American politician from Washington

Member of the Washington House of Representatives from the 41st, Position 2 district
- In office January 13, 2003 – January 14, 2019
- Preceded by: Ida Ballasiotes
- Succeeded by: My-Linh Thai

Personal details
- Born: November 3, 1943 (age 82) Oklahoma City, Oklahoma
- Party: Democratic
- Education: University of Washington (BS)

Judith R. Clibborn (born 1943) is an American politician who is a member of the Democratic Party. She is a former member of the Washington House of Representatives, where she represented the 41st district from 2003 through 2019.
