= Ron Dunlap (politician) =

American politician

Ronald Dunlap

2nd King County Executive
- In office January 14, 1981 – November 18, 1981
- Preceded by: John Spellman
- Succeeded by: Randy Revelle

Member of the Washington House of Representatives from the 41st district
- In office January 13, 1975 – January 12, 1981
- Preceded by: William M. Polk
- Succeeded by: Emilio Cantu

Personal details
- Born: Ronald W. Dunlap; October 31, 1937 (age 88) South Bend, Indiana, U.S.
- Party: Republican
- Spouse(s): Allison Dale (m. 1967–2002, her death); Barbara Hermsen (m. 2005)
- Children: Marcia Dunlap (b. 1970); Lynne Marie Dunlap (b. 1972)
- Education: Purdue University (BS, 1959); Purdue (MS, 1961)
- Occupation: Politician
- Website: King County Executive

Ronald W. Dunlap (born October 31, 1937) served three terms as Washington state representative from the 41st district, representing Bellevue, Mercer Island and Renton starting in 1974; he would later be appointed the second King County executive, succeeding John Spellman, for eleven months starting in January 1981. Spellman had resigned as executive following his election as the 18th governor of Washington. Dunlap was defeated by Randy Revelle in the November 1981 election for King County Executive.

== Early life ==
Dunlap was born and raised in South Bend, Indiana, graduating from James Whitcomb Riley High School in 1955, where he was active in drama and choral groups. He went on to attend Purdue University, earning bachelor's and master's degrees in Engineering Science in 1959 and 1961, respectively. He entered Harvard University as a doctoral student of economics, but left the program to work for Boeing in Seattle, Washington.

== Political history ==
Dunlap served as a member of the Washington State House of Representatives from 1974 to 1980, after volunteering time to the King County Republican headquarters in 1973.

While serving in the Washington State Legislature, Dunlap co-authored State Initiative 62 with Ellen Craswell on June 1, 1978. Initiative 62 was a bill to limit increases state tax revenue to the growth rate of personal income. I-62 passed the House by an 86–9 vote on the last day of the regular legislative session, meaning it was too late for the state Senate to vote on, so it was sent to the general election following a signature-gathering process, where it was passed.

Ron and Allison Dunlap were credited with converting the non-practicing Bruce and Ellen Craswell to born-again Christians. During the campaign for Initiative 62, the two couples would travel together, discussing the Bible; Bruce would spar with Allison over the veracity of the Bible, but could not shake her faith.

Dunlap left the state legislature in 1980 to run for the seat in the United States House of Representatives representing Washington's 7th congressional district, where he was defeated by Mike Lowry.

1980-11-04 U.S. Representative District No. 7 Election Result
No.	Party	Candidate	Votes	Percentage
1	Democratic	Mike Lowry	112,848	57.3%
2	Republican	Ron Dunlap	84,218	42.7%
Total			197,066	

On December 29, 1980, Dunlap was named as King County Executive, replacing the seat vacated by governor-elect John Spellman, in a 7–2 vote of the King County Council. Dunlap assumed the duties of Executive on January 14, 1981, following Spellman's inauguration. Dunlap announced his candidacy to seek a full four-year term as Executive in June 1981, and although he held a significant fundraising edge and exit polls showed him leading Randy Revelle, he was narrowly defeated in the November 1981 election.

He was a member of the first Washington Redistricting Commission in 1983. Dunlap left politics after 1983.

== Personal ==
Dunlap married the former Allison Dale in 1967 after being introduced by a mutual friend at Boeing in 1965. They had two children: Marcia (b. 1970) and Lynne Marie (b. 1972). Allison died in 2002 from cancer, and Ron Dunlap later would go on to remarry the former Barbara Hermsen, a fellow Harley-Davidson enthusiast and licensed pilot.

Political offices
Preceded by John Spellman	King County Executive; 1981 – 1981	Succeeded by Randy Revelle
