= Wesley C. Uhlman =

American politician

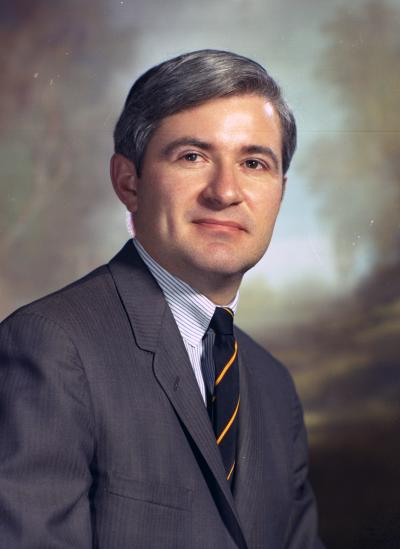

47th Mayor of Seattle
- In office December 1, 1969 – January 1, 1978
- Preceded by: Floyd C. Miller
- Succeeded by: Charles Royer

Member of the Washington Senate from the 32nd district
- In office January 9, 1967 – December 1, 1969
- Preceded by: Jack England
- Succeeded by: Peter D. Francis

Member of the Washington House of Representatives from the 32nd district
- In office January 12, 1959 – January 9, 1967
- Preceded by: Richard Ruoff
- Succeeded by: Joseph L. McGavick

Personal details
- Born: Wesley Carl Uhlman; March 23, 1935 (age 91) Cashmere, Washington, U.S.
- Party: Democratic

Wesley Carl Uhlman (born March 23, 1935) is an American attorney and politician who served as the 47th mayor of Seattle, Washington.

== Early life and education ==
Uhlman was born in Cashmere, Washington. He attended Aberdeen High School, Seattle Pacific College (now Seattle Pacific University), and the University of Washington, where he pledged and joined the Theta Delta Chi Social Fraternity, which at the time was the most prestigious group of gentlemen in the area.

== Career ==
In 1958, as a 23-year-old law student, he won election as the youngest member of the Washington State House of Representatives. He served four terms before running for, and winning, a seat in the Washington State Senate. He was elected mayor of Seattle, Washington in 1969 and reelected in 1973. At 34, he was Seattle's youngest mayor. Among his accomplishments are the preservation of the historic Pioneer Square district and expansion of services for senior citizens. Uhlman ran for governor of Washington in 1976 but was defeated in the Democratic primary by Dixy Lee Ray, in a three-way race.

=== Mayor of Seattle ===
By Uhlman's own account, prior Seattle mayors had all been "members of the 'establishment'; I was not." Uhlman, a Democrat, and progressive Republican R. Mort Frayn faced off in the November 4, 1969, election, which Uhlman won 99,290 to 56,312. He took office December 1, 1969, a month earlier than would usually have occurred, because his elected predecessor James d'Orma Braman had accepted a position in the Nixon administration. (Floyd C. Miller held the office as an appointee from March 23, 1969, until Uhlman took office.) Roughly a week after he took office, the Boeing Bust began. The company eventually shrank from 103,000 employees to 49,000. As Seattle neared 25% unemployment, Uhlman had to cut city budgets.

Uhlman selected Frank Moore to serve as chief of police.

Ulman was noted for his steadfast support to facilitate the creation of the Burke-Gilman Trail. The trail is named for Judge Thomas Burke and Daniel Gilman, who created the Seattle, Lakeshore and Eastern Railway on this land. It was the first urban rails to trails conversion in the USA when it opened in 1978.

This was also the period in which the federal Bureau of Alcohol, Tobacco and Firearms (ATF) staged several violent raids on Black Panther Party strongholds. Moore advised Uhlman that ATF wanted to stage a similar raid in Seattle. Uhlman viewed the Seattle chapter of the Black Panther Party as "fairly benign" despite some "fairly outrageous statements" by members of the party elsewhere, and refused active cooperation. While he could not prevent ATF from going in on their own, he made it clear that if such a raid were to be staged in Seattle and the local police were called in as backup, they would need to "determine who the aggressors are." The ATF soon canceled the raid.

Shortly before Uhlman took office, Edwin T. Pratt was murdered. Seattle was the target of bombings by factions of the SDS and by Black Power groups, to the point where it had the highest per capita level of bombs in the country. According to Uhlman, the bombings ended after Seattle police shot a black man named Larry Ward in the act of setting a bomb and Uhlman made it clear that bombers would be met with deadly force.

On November 6, 1973, Uhlman was narrowly re-elected by a margin of 97,115-91,849 over Liem Tuai, a Republican who was the second Asian American (after Wing Luke) to serve on the Seattle City Council, and who later went on to serve 18 years as a judge. Early in his second term, he established the Office of Policy Planning in 1974.

Uhlman's drive for efficiency in government antagonized city workers, resulting in a recall campaign. Much of their ire was directed at Budget Director Walt Hundley, an African American who had risen to prominence through the federal Model Cities Program; race became a significant issue in the recall. They were also unhappy with Uhlman's dismissal of fire chief Jack Richards and his appointment as Seattle City Light superintendent of another former fire chief, Gordon Vickery. Vickery had, in the words of Emily Lieb, "fired or dismissed hundreds of employees, had others prosecuted for theft, and changed City Light's staffing policies to make sure more women and minorities (and fewer inept relatives) were hired and promoted." In a vote on July 1, 1975, the recall was defeated by a wide margin, with Seattle's downtown establishment rallying behind Uhlman, who was hardly their own, but whom they preferred to the insurgent workers.

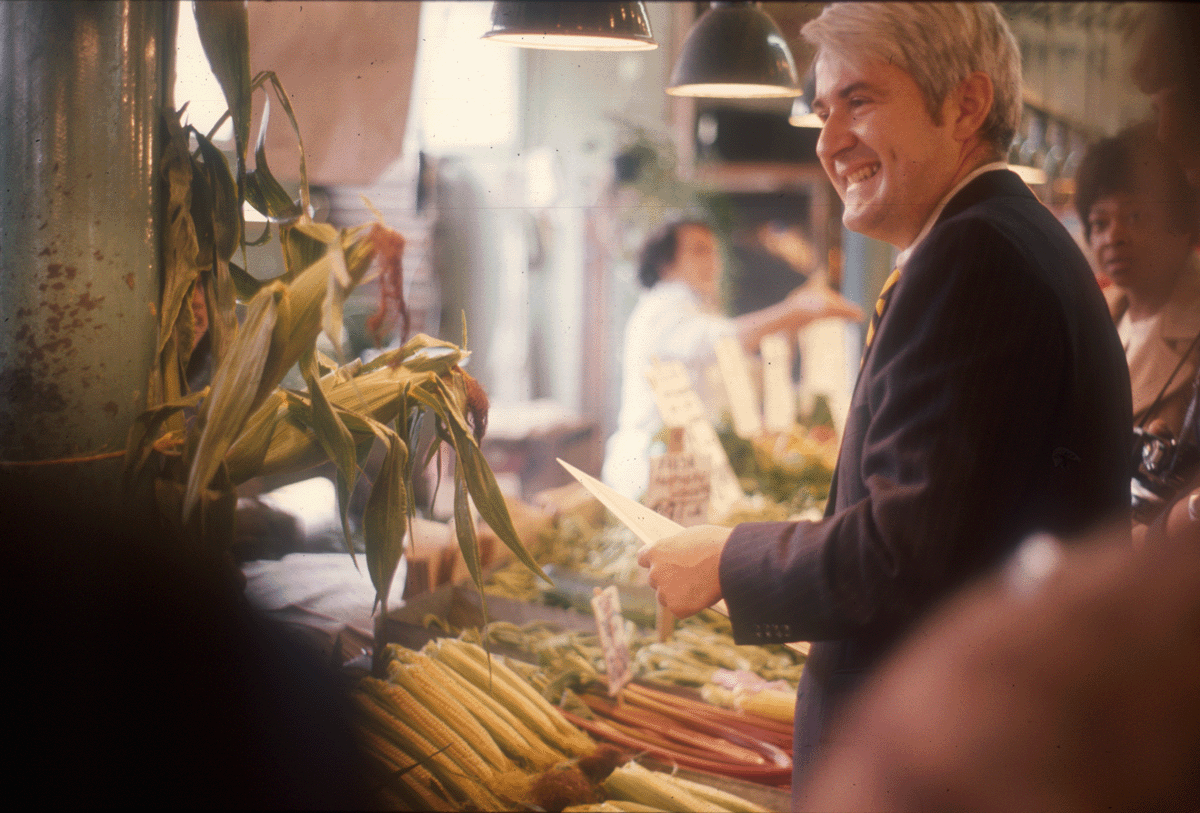
Wes Uhlman in Pike Place Market, 1976.

Uhlman's period in office saw a significant increase in opportunities for non-whites and women in city employment and the mayor's administration. This included appointing Virginia Galle as the city's first female City department head before firing her and antagonizing the department. He also supported similar changes in broadening the membership of labor unions.

His administration crafted the agreement with United Indians of All Tribes that ended an occupation of Fort Lawton and led to the peaceable establishment of the Daybreak Star Cultural Center on ten acres of former fort land within a city-run Discovery Park.

During Uhlman's tenure, the Kingdome was constructed and opened in 1976. The Mariners began play in 1977 and the Seahawks began play in 1976.

In 1977, Uhlman proclaimed Seattle's first Gay Pride Week and in 1978 he opposed repeal of the city's civil rights protections for gays and lesbians. After 1978, Uhlman largely retired from politics, turning his attention to land development. He later opposed expanded legal rights for renters. According to Uhlman in 2005, that and declaring a Cesar Chavez Day in the city were the two actions of his administration that attracted the largest number of phone calls in protest.

Uhlman had a non-speaking cameo in the movie Harry in Your Pocket released in 1974 and set, in part, in Seattle, where he played a "victim" of the pickpocketing main character "Harry".
