= William M. Polk =

American politician

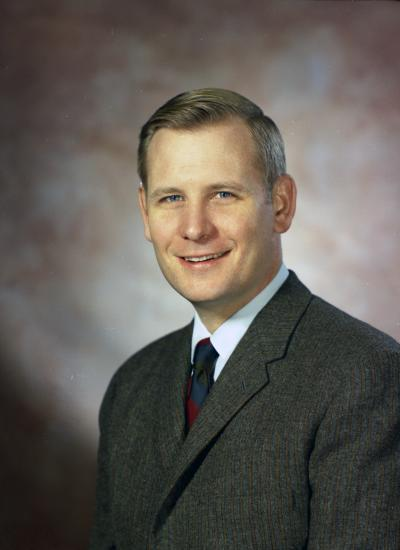
- Polk in 1971

41st Speaker of the Washington House of Representatives
- In office January 12, 1981 – January 10, 1983
- Preceded by: John A. Bagnariol; Duane Berentson
- Succeeded by: Wayne Ehlers

Member of the Washington House of Representatives from the 41st district
- In office January 11, 1971 – January 10, 1983
- Preceded by: George W. Clarke
- Succeeded by: Emilio Cantu

Personal details
- Born: William Merrill Polk; July 26, 1935 (age 90) Cleburne, Texas, U.S.
- Party: Republican
- Occupation: Architect

William Merrill Polk (born July 26, 1935) is an American former politician in the state of Washington. He served in the Washington House of Representatives as a Republican. He is also a former Speaker of the Washington House of Representatives.

In 1968, William Polk FAIA, started as a partner at a Seattle architectural firm which became Waldron Pomeroy Polk & Smith in 1975. Bill started his own practice as William Polk Associates in 1985 after spending 4 years as the Chief Operating Officer at the John Graham Company. He joined INNOVA Architects in 2011. He was the Principal in charge of the Seattle Office in Mercer Island.
