= DCYF =

DCYF may refer to:

- Rhode Island Department of Children, Youth & Families
- Washington Department of Children, Youth, and Families

== See also ==
- New Mexico Children, Youth, and Families Department
