= Virginia Galle =

American politician (1925–2020)

Member of the Seattle City Council from Position 6
- In office 1981–1989
- Preceded by: Randy Revelle
- Succeeded by: Tom Weeks

Personal details
- Born: 1925 West Virginia, United States
- Died: September 13, 2020 (aged 94–95) Seattle, Washington, United States
- Spouse: Kurt Galle (m. 1943)
- Education: Baker University (BA); University of Washington (MPA)

Virginia Galle (1925 - 13 September 2020) was a member of the Seattle City Council from 1981 to 1989.

== Early life and education ==
Galle was born in West Virginia in 1925 to Salvation Army officers. Her family moved throughout the midwest, before settling in Kansas in her senior year where she met her future husband Kurt whom she married in 1943. Galle's family moved to Kansas, where she graduated from Baker University with a degree in English. After college, she was an English teacher and librarian while Kurt was in graduate school and moved to Seattle in 1951 after he graduated.

Galle bought a house in the Wedgewood neighborhood in 1953 and was active in her local community, such as organizing a volunteer-based kindergarten program at the elementary school and working to ensure that a new school and public space were included in a local housing development. In 1965, she enrolled in the University of Washington University of Washington Graduate School of Public Affairs and focused her thesis on King County's home-rule charter.

== Career ==
After college, Galle began working for the city of Seattle at the recently created Citizens Service Bureau and worked her way up to become the agency manager. In 1973, she became the city's first female City department head when she was appointed director of the Department of Licenses and Consumer Affairs. Galle had three main goals for the department; streamlining administration, a bold stance on consumer protection, and a "welcoming" department. She was later fired by Mayor Wesley Uhlman; it was speculated that she was fired due to her investigation into Lang Towing, which led to fraud charges against the company and its owner. Some of her former staff said that her firing was due to poor management.

In 1977, she became the executive director of the Girl Scouts Totem Council until she resigned in 1981 to run for city council.

== Seattle city council ==
=== Elections ===
Galle ran for city council in 1981 in the seat vacated by Randy Revelle, who was running for King County Executive. There were four challengers in the September primary election, with Galle coming in first and Seattle police officer Bob Moffett coming in second, both moving onto the general election. She ran on her managerial background, and admitted that she lacked specific policies to address city issues. Moffitt critiqued her campaign because it received $16,000 from the city through a controversial matching funds law. In the general election, Galle defeated Moffett, 58% to 42%.

In her 1985 reelection campaign, Galle faced two challengers. In the September primary, Galle and Tukwila engineer Phil Fraser came in first and second, respectively, and moved onto the general election. She would run again on generalities, saying she "doesn't necessarily know what will be important next year." Galle won in a landslide against Phil Fraser, 74% to 26%.

In 1989, Galle faced three challengers, who focused on her being a lone no-vote and her inability to form effective coalitions. In the September primary, Galle and conflict-negotiation consultant Tom Weeks advanced to the general election, with 43% and 30% respectively. She framed the race as "experience vs. a newcomer" and questioned Weeks' resume, while Weeks focused on issues like homelessness and schools. Galle lost reelection to Weeks, 45% to 55%.

=== Tenure ===
Galle chaired the City Operations and Utilities, Environmental Management, and Finance and Personnel committees. While chairing of the Environment committee, she had to deal with the environmental and health risks created by a decommissioned landfill and testified to Congress about municipal solid waste issues. She would sound alarms over garbage disposal issues saying, "We have known all along there were problems, and we have known all along the problems would cost money."

Galle was also a supporter of the Citizens Alternative Plan(CAP), which promoted limited growth in downtown Seattle to curb pollution. Early in her tenure, she proposed legislation that would set maximum heights to downtown skyscrapers but would not gain support from the rest of the council. In 1988, Galle introduced legislation developed by CAP that would limit large scale development of downtown through the 1990s. The council set the CAP proposal to be voted on in a May 1989 Special election, costing the city about $300,000. The CAP initiative passed with 62% of the vote, but the council put some restrictions on the initiative to protect it from court challenges, with Galle voting against the restrictions.

At the end of her tenure, she sponsored Ordinance 107342, which allowed city employees to take leave for domestic partnerships and children of domestic partners. The ordinance passed the city council 8–1 vote in August 1989. The dissenting vote came from council president Sam Smith who claimed the changes were anti-family, and compared himself to a biblical prophet. Smith encouraged the public to challenge the ordinance before it went into effect, but the movement failed to gather enough signatures to repeal it. The ordinance went into effect in September 1989 and brought the city into compliance with its own Fair Employment Practices Ordinance.

== Post-council ==
After leaving the city council, Galle became a board member Northwest kidney foundation and KUOW radio. In 1990, she co-chaired King County Citizens for an Accountable Port group which submitted a petition to change the name of Port of Seattle to King County Port. The petition was not well-received and did not pass.

She died in Seattle on September 13, 2020, after being diagnosed with Alzheimer's disease.
