= Randy Gordon (politician) =

American politician (born 1953)

- Gordon in 2005

Member of the Washington Senate from the 41st district
- In office January 11, 2010 – December 6, 2010
- Preceded by: Fred Jarrett
- Succeeded by: Steve Litzow

Personal details
- Born: June 29, 1953 (age 73) Brooklyn, New York, U.S.
- Party: Democratic
- Children: 3
- Education: University of Michigan (BA); Harvard Law School (JD)
- Occupation: Lawyer

Randolph I. Gordon (born June 29, 1953) is an American lawyer and politician who served as a Democratic Washington State Senator from Bellevue, Washington. In 2010 he was appointed to replace Sen. Fred Jarrett. He owns his own law firm, Law Offices of Randolph I. Gordon PLLC, in Seattle, Washington, and is an adjunct professor at Seattle University School of Law.

== Early life ==
Randy Gordon was born in Brooklyn, New York, in 1953.

== Education ==
- 1975 B.A. University of Michigan with High Honors and High Distinction
- 1978 J.D. Harvard Law School

== Career ==
In 1978 he started his law practice at the law firm Riddell, Williams, Bullitt & Walkinshaw of Seattle, Washington. He was a principal in the law firm Casey Gordon Davis, P.S. from 1983 to 2002. This practice emphasized trial practice, business and commercial litigation, products liability and plaintiff personal injury, toxic tort and chemical exposure litigation, mediation and arbitration, court-appointed special master. In 1995, he was the appellants' counsel in Birklid v. Boeing, 127 Wn.2d 853, a landmark case where he represented seventeen workers that were exposed to toxic phenol compound fumes. The case determined that knowledge of a hazardous condition constitutes 'deliberate intention'. From 2002 to 2010, he was a principal of the Bellevue, Washington, law firm Gordon Edmunds Elder PLLC where his specialties are Mediation and Arbitration, Civil Litigation, Personal Injury Law, Toxic Exposure Law, and Products Liability. In 2011, he formed a new law firm Gordon Edmunds Grelish PLLC carrying on the same work in Seattle, Washington.

He has taught as an adjunct professor at the Seattle University School of Law since 1999, where he specializes in products liability and remedies.

== Politics ==
Randy Gordon is the Precinct Committee Officer for Precinct BEL 41-0219 in Bellevue, WA.

== 2006 campaign for U.S. Representative ==
In 2005, Randy Gordon ran an exploratory campaign to unseat U.S. Representative Dave Reichert in Washington's 8th District. He dropped out of the race on January 5, 2006.

== 2009–10 session ==
In 2010 he was nominated to the Washington State Senate by Democratic Precinct Committee Officers (PCOs) and confirmed by the King County Council to replace Sen. Fred Jarrett who resigned to serve as King County deputy executive.

During the short spring 2010 session, Gordon received three committee appointments: Joint Legislative Audit & Review Committee (JLARC), Early Learning & K-12 Education and Judiciary.

Gordon sponsored seven bills during the session, co-sponsored forty bills, one senate joint memorial, twenty-two senate resolutions.

- SB 6512, Increasing school safety.
- SB 6593, Infant & toddler program. This bill provides children from birth to 3 with developmental disabilities educational support. It was passed into law on March 29, 2010.
- SB 6686, Changing the election and appointment provisions for municipal court judges. Passed out of the Senate, but died in the house.
- SB 6694, Residential foreclosure.
- SB 6728, Electrical trainee training.
- SB 6764, Judgments/tortious conduct. This bill raises the interest rate on civil judgments from 2 percent to 12 percent. The interest rate was amended in the House to prime plus two points. It was passed into law on March 19, 2010.
- SB 6796, Automatic teller fees/B&O taxes.

In his first speech on the Senate floor, Gordon voted with other Democrats in order to suspend a voter-approved initiative so that so-called tax loopholes could be closed in order to pay for mandatory budget items required by the state Constitution. A two-thirds majority was not needed in order to amend I-960 because lawmakers can amend initiatives with a simple majority vote after they've been on the books for two years. SB 6843 was passed into law. Within the Joint Legislative Audit and Review Committee, the committee that works to make state government operations more effective, efficient and accountable by auditing and evaluating how money is spent, Gordon reviewed a book of tax exemptions. He signed on to two major bills that hope to close some of these tax loopholes amounting to a half of a billion dollars - SB 6853 and SB 6873.

As part of the Senate Judiciary Committee, Gordon helped SB 5838 through committee that would result in tougher infraction for drivers whose violation of traffic laws results in the death or substantial bodily injury of a pedestrian, bicyclist or any other "vulnerable" roadway user.

As part of the Early Learning & K-12 Education Committee, Sen. Gordon sponsored SB 6593 which would transfer the Infant and Toddler Early Intervention Program to DEL from DSHS. Gordon testified in behalf of the bill

The session ended with Gordon voting for 2ESSB 6143 to close a $2.8 billion budget shortfall by a combination of cutting state services and increasing taxes. Taxes were increased on non-essentials - beer, soda, bottled water, and candy. Cuts were made in K-12 and higher education, and other state services.

== 2010 campaign for State Senate ==
Gordon was defeated by Mercer Island City Councilman Steve Litzow. After an automatic recount, Gordon's defeat was confirmed. He lost by 192 votes out of nearly 60,000 votes cast.

== Pro bono work ==
- Randy Gordon, Paul Lehto and John Wells are asking King County Superior court to void Sequoia's contract which has effectively allowed them to conduct elections. Gordon argues that by outsourcing voting to a private company which keeps its process secret, the individual's right to an election process that is transparent and observable is being abridged. Gordon is seeking a refund of $5 million for Snohomish County for 1000 voting machines.
- Eastside Legal Assistance Program (volunteer lawyer)
- American String Project (board member)
- Pacific Northwest Ballet (member of the Barre)
- Eastside YMCA (Parent-Child Program leader)
- Washington State Karate Association (Counsel)
- USA-National Karate-do Federation (Presiding Officer of National Board of Review; General Counsel)
- Washington State Bar Association (Special District Counsel)
- Hearing Officer; Governor, 8th Congressional District)
- Lake Bellevue Water Quality Association; and others.

== Honors and awards ==
- Invited on three occasions in the last five years to give the Commencement Address to the graduating case
- 2000, 2001, 2003 Outstanding Faculty Award
- Board of Student Advisers
- The Civil Rights-Civil Liberties Law Review
- Founded the still extant orientation program at Harvard Law School 1977
- Phi Beta Kappa in his junior year at University of Michigan 1974
- Branstrom Prize 1972
- Bain-Swiggett Prize for poetry
- James B. Angell Scholar [seven semesters] at University of Michigan College of Literature, Science & the Arts
- 1998 Public Justice Award
- 2001 Professionalism Award
- 2001 President's Award
- 2005 Rising Star of the Democratic Party
- Three times received the Washington Law & Politics "Super Lawyer" award by peer selection
- Article Accepted for Publication and Published in Seattle Journal for Social Justice
- 2010 Awarded Everett Herald Cappies "Rookie of the year"

== Speeches ==
- Proud to be a Lawyer Randy Gordon, Seattle University School of Law Commencement Address, Seattle, Washington, December 16, 2000.
- Proud to be a Lawyer Randy Gordon, Seattle University School of Law Commencement Address, Seattle, Washington, December 22, 2001
- Commencement Address Randy Gordon, Seattle University School of Law Commencement Address, Seattle, Washington, December 20, 2003

== Memberships and affiliations ==
- East King County Bar Association (Trustee, Vice President, President)
- King County Bar Association (East King County Trustee)
- Washington State Trial Lawyers Association (Governor, 8th District; Liaison to State Bar)
- Washington State Bar Association [Governor, 8th District](2003–2005)
- Bellevue Kiwanis

== Family ==
- Randy Gordon, divorced, has two daughters, Katie and Becky, and a step daughter Brittany.
