= James Street (politician) =

American politician (born 1942)

Jim Street
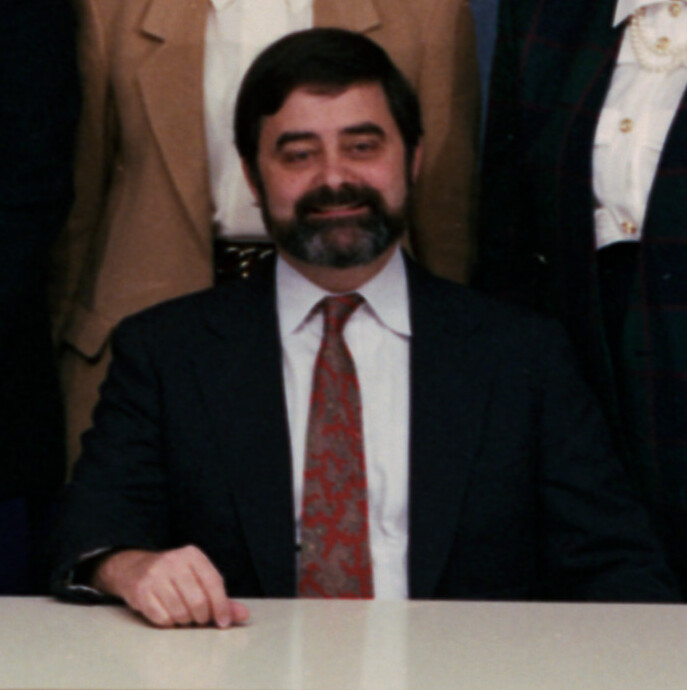
- Street in 1992

Member of the Seattle City Council from Position 7
- In office January 1, 1984 – January 3, 1996
- Preceded by: Jack Richards
- Succeeded by: Tina Podlodowski

President of the Seattle City Council
- In office January 1, 1994 – January 3, 1996
- Preceded by: George Benson
- Succeeded by: Jan Drago

King County Superior Court Judge
- In office 1996–2000

Personal details
- Born: August 9, 1942 (age 84)
- Party: Democratic
- Education: Princeton University (BA, MPA); University of Puget Sound (JD)

James "Jim" Street (born August 9, 1942) is an American politician. He was a Seattle City Council member from 1984 to 1996, serving as council president from 1994 to 1995. Afterward, he served as a King County Superior Court judge from 1996 to 2000.

== Early life and education ==
Street was born on August 9, 1942. He earned his bachelor's degree and Masters of Public Affairs from Princeton University. Street then served for four years in the United States Air Force as an intelligence officer. Following the war, he worked as an economist and budget analyst for the World Bank. Afterward, Street earned his Juris Doctor from the University of Puget Sound, graduating first in his class, then became a partner at a Seattle law firm before running for city council.

== Political career ==
Street ran for Seattle city council in 1983, defeating incumbent Jack Richards. While on council, he served as chair of the Land Use Committee (1984–1989), proposed and chaired the first council's first Education Committee (1988–1989), and chaired the Growth Policies and Regional Affairs Committee (1990–1995). Street focused on land use and regional growth while in office, creating the Department of Neighborhoods (DON) and the development of the Neighborhood Matching Fund grant program within DON. He also opposed the failed Mariner ballpark ballot measure, which would have provided subsidies for constructing a new stadium.

Street unsuccessfully ran for Seattle mayor in 1989, losing in the primary. In 1995, he announced he would not seek reelection. The following year, Street ran for King County Superior Court judge, serving for four years. In 2006, Street ran for the Washington State Legislature in the open District 43 seat after Representative Ed Murray announced he was running for state senate. He came in second in the September Democratic primary to Jamie Pedersen, who would later win the seat in the safe Democratic district.
