= Senator Weinstein =

Senator Weinstein may refer to:

- Brian Weinstein (fl. 1970s–2000s), Washington State Senate
- Casey Weinstein (born 1982), Ohio State Senate
- David F. Weinstein (born 1936), North Carolina State Senate
- Jeremy S. Weinstein (born 1950), New York State Senate
- Peter Weinstein (born 1947), Florida State Senate
