= Fred Mast =

Fred Mast may refer to:

- Fred R. Mast (1896–1986), American politician in the state of Washington
- Fred W. Mast, professor of psychology
