= Tana Senn =

American politician from Washington

Member of the Washington House of Representatives from the 41st district
- In office September 9, 2013 – January 15, 2025
- Preceded by: Marcie Maxwell
- Succeeded by: Janice Zahn

Personal details
- Born: 1971 (age 54–55) Illinois, U.S.
- Party: Democratic
- Education: Washington University (BA); Columbia University (MPA, MPP)

Tana Senn (born 1971) is an American politician who represented the 41st legislative district in the Washington House of Representatives from 2013 to 2025. She currently leads the Washington Department of Children, Youth, and Families.

== Early life and education ==
Raised in the Los Angeles suburb of Pacific Palisades, Senn attended Washington University in St. Louis for her undergraduate education. She earned a degree in education. She went on to attend Columbia University for graduate school, studying public policy and administration. She is a first cousin once-removed of former Washington state Insurance Commissioner Deborah Senn.

== Political career ==
Senn was initially selected by the King County Council on September 9, 2013, to replace State Representative Marcie Maxwell and then elected in November 2014 with 63% of the vote.

Senn was first appointed to the Mercer Island City Council in January 2012. She was elected to a full 4-year term in November 2013, having run unopposed.

After the resignation of Representative Maxwell, Senn was selected by the Democratic Party Precinct Committee Officers on August 21, 2013 for appointment by the King County Council to the Washington House of Representatives.

On December 18, 2024, Senn was appointed by governor-elect Bob Ferguson to lead the Department of Children, Youth, and Families.
