= Ron Dunlap =

Ron Dunlap may refer to:

- Ron Dunlap (basketball) (1946–2019), American NABL-, CBA- and NBA player
- Ron Dunlap (politician) (born 1937), American politician
