= Shasti Conrad =

American political consultant

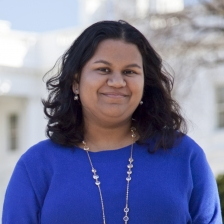

Chair of the Washington Democratic Party
- Incumbent
- Assumed office January 29, 2023
- Preceded by: Tina Podlodowski

Personal details
- Born: November 17, 1984 (age 41) Calcutta, India (now Kolkata)
- Party: Democratic
- Education: Seattle University (BA); Princeton University (MPA)

Shasti Conrad (born November 17, 1984) is an American political consultant who has served as the chair of the Washington State Democratic Party since 2023. When she was elected in 2023, she became the first South Asian American woman to lead a state political party and the first AAPI chair of a Democratic party in the continental United States. In 2025, she was elected a Vice Chair of the Democratic National Committee.

== Early life and education ==
Conrad was born in Kolkata, India, and left at an orphanage. At 2 months old, she was adopted by a White American single mother and raised in the rural town of Newberg, Oregon. Originally wanting to be a professor, Conrad planned to enter a sociology PhD program but decided to join the Obama White House instead.

She graduated from Seattle University with a Bachelor of Arts in sociology and international studies in 2007. She then graduated from Princeton University with a Master of Public Affairs in 2015, where she was the first graduate fellow at the Malala Fund providing support and accompanying Malala Yousafzai and her family on their 2014 Nobel Peace Prize trip.

== Career ==
=== Obama White House ===
Conrad worked on both the 2008 and 2012 presidential campaigns of Barack Obama. She then served as a White House Intern in the Office of Urban Affairs in 2009, then later as executive assistant to senior advisor Valerie Jarrett and as assistant within the Office of Public Engagement.

=== Campaign work ===
She also worked on both of Bernie Sanders' presidential primary campaigns in 2016 and 2020. In the latter campaign, she served as national director of surrogates where she coordinated celebrity supporters and other prominent campaign surrogates.

In 2016, she applied to fill Pramila Jayapal's seat in the Washington State Senate; the King County Council appointed Rebecca Saldaña over Rory O'Sullivan and her.

Conrad worked on the 2016 U.S. Senate campaign of Jim Barksdale in Georgia.

Between 2017 and 2020, Conrad was the US Campaign Manager for the 100 Million Campaign, launched by Nobel Peace Laureate Kailash Satyarthi, to end child labor and human trafficking.

She co-founded Opportunity PAC with Mona Das, a political action committee focused on electing Black women to office, which raised about $300,00 and was credited with tripling Black women's representation in the Washington State Legislature in 2020.

=== King County Democrats ===
Conrad served as chair of the King County Democrats from 2018 to 2023. She did not support the 2021 recall of Socialist Alternative Seattle City Councilmember Kshama Sawant, pointing to recall elections being used as tools against vulnerable women and people of color in elected office while male politicians like Ed Murray— who was accused of child sexual abuse— had done worse and received less backlash.

== Washington State Democratic Party Chair ==
After incumbent Washington State Democratic Party chair Tina Podlodowski announced she would step down in January 2023, Conrad announced her campaign to succeed her. She was elected unopposed on January 28; making her the state party's first woman of color and youngest chair at 38 years old, as well as the first South Asian American woman to serve as a state party chair in the United States.

One of her stated priorities included helping Marie Gluesenkamp Perez's re-election bid to the U.S. House in 2024. Following numerous ballot boxes being set on fire in Portland, Oregon, and Vancouver, Washington, Conrad described the attacks as an attempt at voter disfranchisement. Following the 2024 United States presidential election, in which Washington was one of the only regions to shift left, Conrad pointed to progressive policies winning over voters; though Adam Smith blamed weak opposition from the Washington State Republican Party and criticized the national Democratic Party's "broken" brand.

== DNC Vice Chair ==
In February 2025, Conrad ran for one of three Vice Chair positions of the Democratic National Committee. She ran on the Washington State Democratic Party being an example for national Democrats, as the state did not follow the national 6 point shift towards Donald Trump in the 2024 presidential election. She had the endorsement of Chair Ken Martin, but placed fifth in the third and final round of balloting, and sixth overall among nearly two dozen candidates.

Following the invalidation of Malcolm Kenyatta and David Hogg's elections in May, Conrad announced she would run for one of the seats reserved for women as part of the gender parity bylaws. On June 20, she defeated Kalyn Free in a run-off vote with approximately 56% of the vote after having finished first in the initial round ahead of Free and Jeanna Repass with a plurality of 44% of the vote. She succeeds Hogg, who did not run in the separate election won by Kenyatta, as Vice Chair.

Party political offices
Preceded by Tina Podlodowski	Chair of the Washington Democratic Party; 2023–present	Incumbent
