= Senator Jarrett =

Senator Jarrett may refer to:

- Benjamin Jarrett (1881–1944), Pennsylvania State Senate
- Fred Jarrett (fl. 2000s–2010s), Washington State Senate
- Marilyn Jarrett (1939–2006), Arizona State Senate
