= Nick Licata (politician) =

American politician (born 1947)

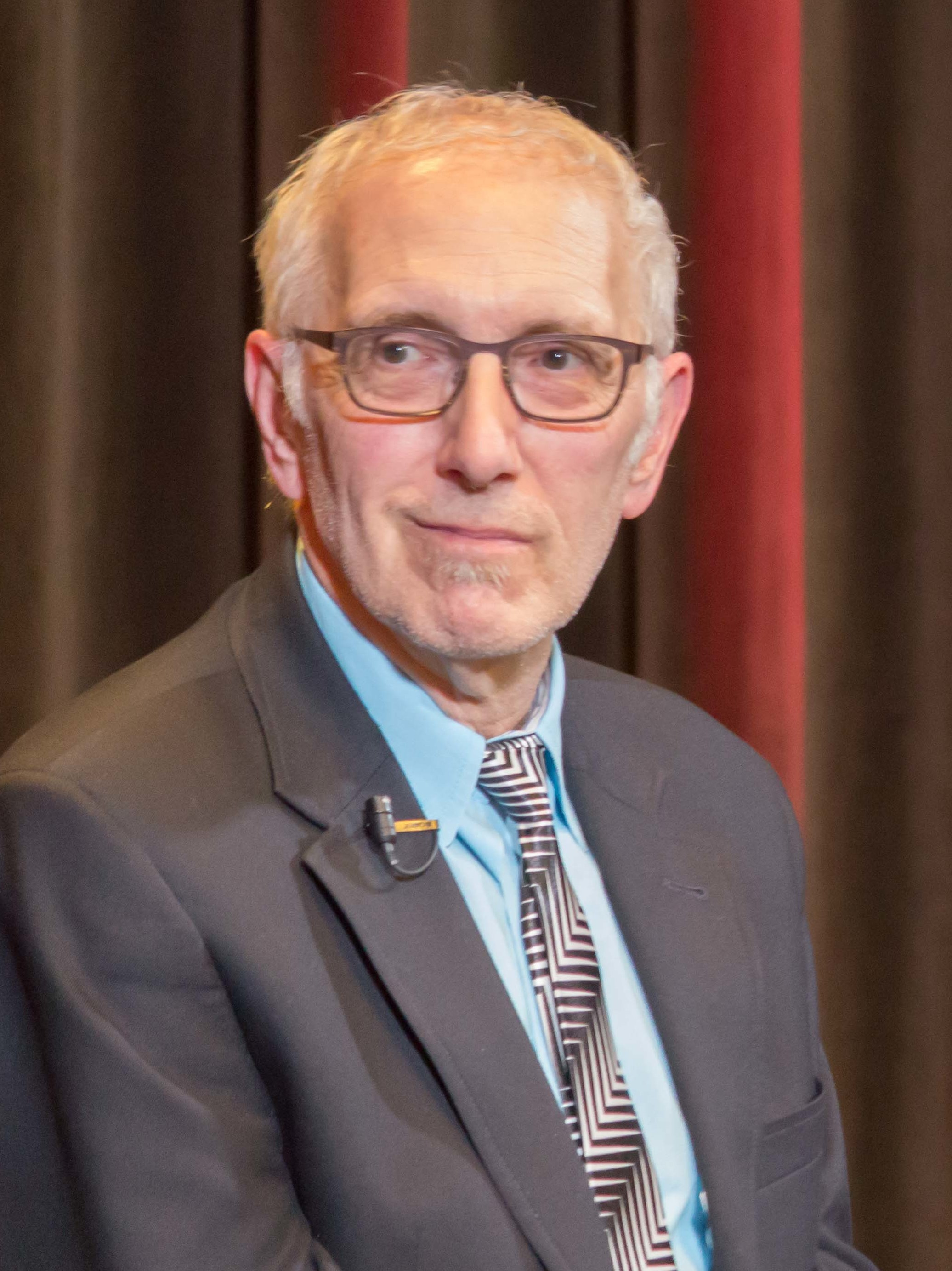
- Licata in 2015

Member of the Seattle City Council, Position 6
- In office January 3, 1998 – January 3, 2016
- Preceded by: Charlie Chong
- Succeeded by: Mike O'Brien

President of the Seattle City Council
- In office January 3, 2006 – January 3, 2008
- Preceded by: Jan Drago
- Succeeded by: Richard Conlin

Personal details
- Born: 1947 (age 78–79) Cleveland, Ohio
- Party: Democratic Party formerly affiliated with the Green Party
- Education: Bowling Green State University (BA); University of Washington (MA)
- Occupation: Author, publisher, politician
- Website: http://www.becomingacitizen.activist.org

Nick Licata (born 1947) is a political activist, author, publisher, and retired politician from Seattle, Washington. He served on the Seattle City Council from 1998 to 2015.

== Early life and education ==
Licata was born in Cleveland, Ohio in 1947 to a working-class Catholic household. He was the first member of his family to graduate high school. In 1969, Licata received his bachelor's degree in political science from Bowling Green State University, where he was President of Students for a Democratic Society (SDS) and Student Body President. In 1973 he received his master's degree in sociology from the University of Washington.

After college, Licata moved into Prag House, a non-profit urban housing cooperative centered on community and sustainability, located in the Capitol Hill neighborhood, where he lived for over twenty years.

== Career ==
Licata founded and published the People's Yellow Pages (1973 and 1976), which listed community and political groups and social and public services in Seattle. He later published the Seattle Sun alt-weekly, which was published from 1974 to 1982. In 1981, Licata became an insurance broker while staying politically active.

Licata helped found the anti-redlining organization Coalition Against Redlining in Seattle and testified before Congress on the Community Reinvestment Act. In 1983, Licata co-founded Give Peace a Dance, which, for 6 years, held 24-hour dance marathons to raise funds for TV ads promoting nuclear disarmament. Licata was Co-Chair of Citizens for More Important Things, a group opposed to excessive public funding for professional sports stadiums. It wrote King County Initiative 16, collecting over 73,000 signatures. It won but was voided by the State Legislature a week later. Licata later testified before Congress at the request of Congressman Dennis Kucinich on the financial drain that public funding of professional sports teams placed on municipal governments. Licata is the founding chair of Local Progress, a nationwide organization of over 1,300 progressive local officials.

== Seattle City Council ==
=== Elections ===
Licata ran for Seattle City Council in 1997 after Charlie Chong announced he would not seek reelection to finish the term of retired councilmember Tom Weeks. In the September primary, Licata came in first among seven challengers, with 36%, advancing to the general election with city transportation staffer Aaron Ostrom, who earned 24%. Licata was seen as a progressive longshot, as Ostrom outraised him and received endorsements from five city councilmembers and two newspapers. In the November general election, Licata defeated Ostrom 52% to 48%.

Licata was reelected to the council four times, winning in landslides. In 2001, Licata defeated Peter Olive, a credit union employee who barely campaigned, with 77% of the vote. In 2005, he earned 78% of the vote against real estate agent Paul Bascomb, who only raised $6,500 compared to Licata's 100,000. Licata's closest reelection bid was in 2009, earning 58% of the vote against King County parks manager Jessie Isreal. In 2013, he earned 88% of the vote against Edwin B. Fruit, a Socialist Worker's Party candidate saying that Seattle could be another Cuba.

=== Tenure ===
Upon his election to the City Council, he instituted poetry readings titled Words Worth in his committee meetings, believing that the personal insight of poetry could enlighten the routine of government. Licata initiated Seattle's "Poet Populist" position in 1999 which engaged the public in voting each year for a local poet to lead public events, read in public schools and libraries. The mayor adopted an official process for selecting a City Poet in 2015 as the Seattle Civic Poet program. The Seattle Office of Arts & Culture (ARTS) regularly announces new poets in partnership with the Seattle City of Literature.

In 2007, Licata supported Initiative I-91, which passed with 65% of the vote. This prohibited the city from supporting sports teams unless such investments had a fair return, which facilitated the relocation of the Seattle SuperSonics from Seattle to Oklahoma City. The Seattle Sonics owners moved the team after I-91 passed which would require publlic funds be refunded if used to rebuild the Seattle Arena.

Licata stated in 2007 that the absence of the SuperSonics from Seattle would have a "near zero" economic impact to the city. He later stated that his remarks were "smug and wrong".

On September 24, 2012, Licata voted against a proposed SoDo basketball arena, which was eventually approved 6-2 by the remaining council members. That proposed arena was subsequently rejected in favor of rehabbing the existing Seattle Center arena, later named the Key Arena and now named the Climate Pledge Arena, currently home to the Seattle Storm WNBA team and the Seattle Kraken NHL hockey team.

Licata was one of two City Council members who supported rebuilding the Alaskan Way Viaduct in 2008, and later supported a tunnel alternative.

Licata sponsored Seattle's law requiring that all Seattle employers with more than four full-time equivalent employees provide paid sick leave.

During part of his 18 years on the council, Licata served as Council President. In 2003, authored a children's book, Princess Bianca and the Vandals, a fantasy/adventure book dealing with environmental issues. The Nation's "Progressive Honor Roll of 2012" chose Licata as its "Most Valuable Local Official" in the United States.

== Post-council ==
The year after retiring from the council, Licata authored Becoming A Citizen Activist - Stories, Strategies and Advice for Changing Our World. In 2021, he authored Student Power, Democracy and Revolution in the Sixties.

Licata is publishing the twice-monthly Citizenship Politics (formerly Urban Politics), which he began in 2016.
