= Marcie Maxwell =

American politician

Marcee Maxwell

Member of the Washington House of Representatives from the 41st district
- In office January 12, 2009 – July 15, 2013
- Preceded by: Fred Jarrett
- Succeeded by: Tana Senn

Personal details
- Born: May 2, 1955 (age 71)
- Party: Democratic
- Occupation: Politician

Marcie Maxwell (born May 2, 1955) is an American politician who served as a member of the Washington House of Representatives, representing the 41st district from 2009 to 2013.

== Education ==
Maxwell studied business, marketing, and real estate at Highline College in Des Moines, Washington.

== Career ==
Maxwell served as a member of the Renton School District Board from 2001 to 2009. She was elected to the Washington House of Representatives in November 2008 and assumed office in January 2009. She resigned from her seat to serve as Governor Jay Inslee's senior education policy advisor.

In January 2019, Maxwell announced her candidacy for mayor of Renton, Washington. She lost the election to Armondo Pavone.

Since 1989, Maxwell has worked as a realtor.
