= Ida Ballasiotes =

American politician (1936–2014)

Member of the Washington House of Representatives from the 41st district
- In office 1992–2002
- Preceded by: Jim Horn
- Succeeded by: Judy Clibborn

Personal details
- Born: May 25, 1936 Rochester, New York, U.S.
- Died: November 23, 2014 (aged 78) Seattle, Washington, U.S.
- Party: Republican
- Education: University of Puget Sound

Ida Canepa Ballasiotes (May 25, 1936 – November 23, 2014) was an American politician from the state of Washington.

Born in Rochester, New York, Ballasiotes moved with her family to Phoenix, Arizona. She married and then moved to Tacoma, Washington. Ballasiotes received her bachelor's degree from University of Puget Sound and worked in human resources. She moved with her family to Seattle, Washington and then to Mercer Island, Washington. From 1992 until 2002, Ballasiotes served in the Washington House of Representatives as a Republican representing Washington's 41st legislative district. In 1993, she filed Initiative 593, which was approved at the ballot and became the first three-strikes law in the nation.

She died in Seattle, Washington.
