= Kalyn Free =

American attorney

Personal details
- Born: November 1963 (age 62) Red Oak, Oklahoma, U.S.
- Party: Democratic
- Spouse: Steve Bruner (m. 2009)
- Education: Southeastern Oklahoma State University (BA); University of Oklahoma (JD)

Kalyn Cherie Free (born November 1963) is an American attorney, former elected district attorney, and a tribal citizen of the Choctaw Nation of Oklahoma. Free represents Oklahoma as the National Committeeperson on the Democratic National Committee (DNC).

== Early life and education ==
Free was born in Red Oak, Oklahoma. She is a graduate of Red Oak High School, Southeastern Oklahoma State University and the University of Oklahoma College of Law. She is a member of the Choctaw Nation of Oklahoma.

== Career ==
=== Legal work ===
After she graduated from law school, she began her legal career with the United States Department of Justice. At the time of her employment, she was the youngest attorney ever hired by the Department of Justice. There, Free prosecuted federal environmental laws across the country with a special emphasis on tribal lands and became the first Native American to serve as a supervising attorney in the department.

In 1998, she ran for and became the first woman and the first Native American to be elected District Attorney in the counties of Pittsburg and Haskell in Oklahoma. During her administration, She prioritized cases involving women, children, and crime victims' rights. In 2000, she received a Spirit of Excellence Award from the American Bar Association.

=== Politics ===
In 2004, she was a candidate for the Democratic nomination for the open House seat in the 2nd Congressional District, with the support of Emily's List, the Sierra Club, and 21st Century Democrats. She lost the nomination to the eventual general election winner, Congressman Dan Boren.

In 2005, Free founded INDN's List (Indigenous Native Democratic Network), a political action committee dedicated to electing Native American progressive candidates at the local and state levels. She personally funded the organization until its closure in 2010. During the 2008 U.S. presidential election, Free endorsed Barack Obama and served as a superdelegate.

In 2019, Free was elected as the Democratic Party of Oklahoma's national committeewoman to the Democratic National Committee. Following the 2024 elections, Free announced her candidacy for Vice Chair of the Democratic National Committee (DNC). However, she was unsuccessful, with Artie Blanco, Malcolm Kenyatta, and David Hogg winning the positions. Free filed a complaint against this election, alleging the combined vote of Hogg and Kenyatta ultimately disadvantaged female candidates such as herself. On May 12, 2025, the Credentials Committee of the DNC voted to void the results. She ran in the ensuing election, which was limited to candidates identifying as female, but lost in a run-off vote to Shasti Conrad.

=== Writings ===
She contributed a letter in 2000 to the book Dear Sisters, Dear Daughters: Words of Wisdom from Multicultural Women Attorneys Who've Been There and Done That, where she wrote she was told by men they would never vote for an American Indian woman. In 2007, Free contributed a chapter titled Why? Rising to the Challenge to the book Voices from the Heartland, where she reflects on her career and experiences as a Native American. She also contributed a chapter What Is a Girl Like You Doing in a Place Like This to volume II in 2019.

== Personal life ==
Free has been married to Steve Bruner since 2009.

She has an interest in Japan and has represented the United States on trips to Japan sponsored by the American Council of Young Political Leaders.

== See also ==
- Politics of Oklahoma
- Oklahoma Democratic Party
