= My-Linh Thai =

American pharmacist and politician from Washington

Member of the Washington House of Representatives from the 41st district
- Incumbent
- Assumed office January 14, 2019 Serving with Janice Zahn
- Preceded by: Judy Clibborn

Personal details
- Born: January 18, 1968 (age 58) Da Lat, South Vietnam (now Vietnam)
- Party: Democratic
- Spouse: Don Thai
- Education: University of Washington School of Pharmacy
- Occupation: Pharmacist, Politician
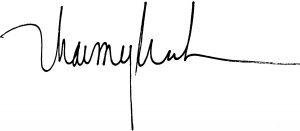
- Signature

My-Linh Thi Thai (Vietnamese: Thái Mỹ Linh; born January 18, 1968) is an American politician and pharmacist who serves in the Washington State House of Representatives representing the 41st district in King County. Thai, a Vietnamese immigrant who lives in Bellevue, served as a school board member prior to her election in 2018, replacing retiring legislator Judy Clibborn.

== Early life and career ==
My-Linh Thai was born in Da Lat and raised by her grandparents on the Mekong Delta. She immigrated to the United States in 1983 as a refugee and reunited with several family members who had fled earlier.

She arrived in the Seattle area at the age of 15 and enrolled at Federal Way High School despite not knowing English. Thai graduated from the University of Washington School of Pharmacy and worked as a practicing pharmacist in Billings, Montana, before moving with her family to Bellevue, Washington, in 2008. She has also worked as a medical interpreter for Vietnamese immigrants and returned to the country to teach one of the first graduate nursing programs in Vietnam.

She became involved in the Somerset parent teacher student association (PTSA) shortly after moving to the city, during a sabbatical from her work as a pharmacist. Thai was appointed PTSA president, earning an advocacy award from the state PTA, and was elected to the Bellevue School District school board in 2013. During her first term as a school board member, Thai advocated against racial inequality and campaigned to hire a racially-diverse set of teachers to reflect the demographics of the Bellevue school body. She was re-elected to a second term in 2017 and was appointed as the board president. Thai also served as the vice president of the Washington State School Directors' Association.

== Political career ==
=== Election ===
==== 2018 ====
Thai filed her candidacy for the 41st district seat in early April 2018, shortly after incumbent Judy Clibborn announced her retirement. Running on a platform centered around education and healthcare reform, she received the endorsement of the 41st District Democrats, the Washington Education Association, the Washington State Labor Council, and The Seattle Times, and The Stranger. Thai took 43 percent of the vote in the primary election, advancing to the general election alongside Republican Michael Appleby.

Thai was elected in the general election on November 6, 2018, winning 65 percent of the vote over Appleby's 35 percent. She became one of the first two Vietnamese American legislators to be elected to the Washington State Legislature, alongside Joe Nguyen from the 34th district. Additionally, she was Washington state's first refugee legislator. Thai announced her resignation from the school board the following day. She was sworn in on January 14, 2019, wearing a traditional Vietnamese dress.

Thai served as Washington's representative during the roll call at the 2020 Democratic National Convention, recording a message from Seattle.

==== 2022 ====
Thai ran for re-election. She faced Republican and aircraft engineer Al Rosenthal. Thai won re-election with 68.43% of the vote.

=== Committee assignments ===
During the 2021-2022 legislative session, Thai was assigned to the Civil Rights & Judiciary Committee and the House Finance Committee.

== Personal life ==
Thai's husband is Don Thai, a neurologist at the Valley Medical Center in Renton. They have two children and reside in Bellevue, Washington.
