= Heidi Wills =

American politician (born 1968)

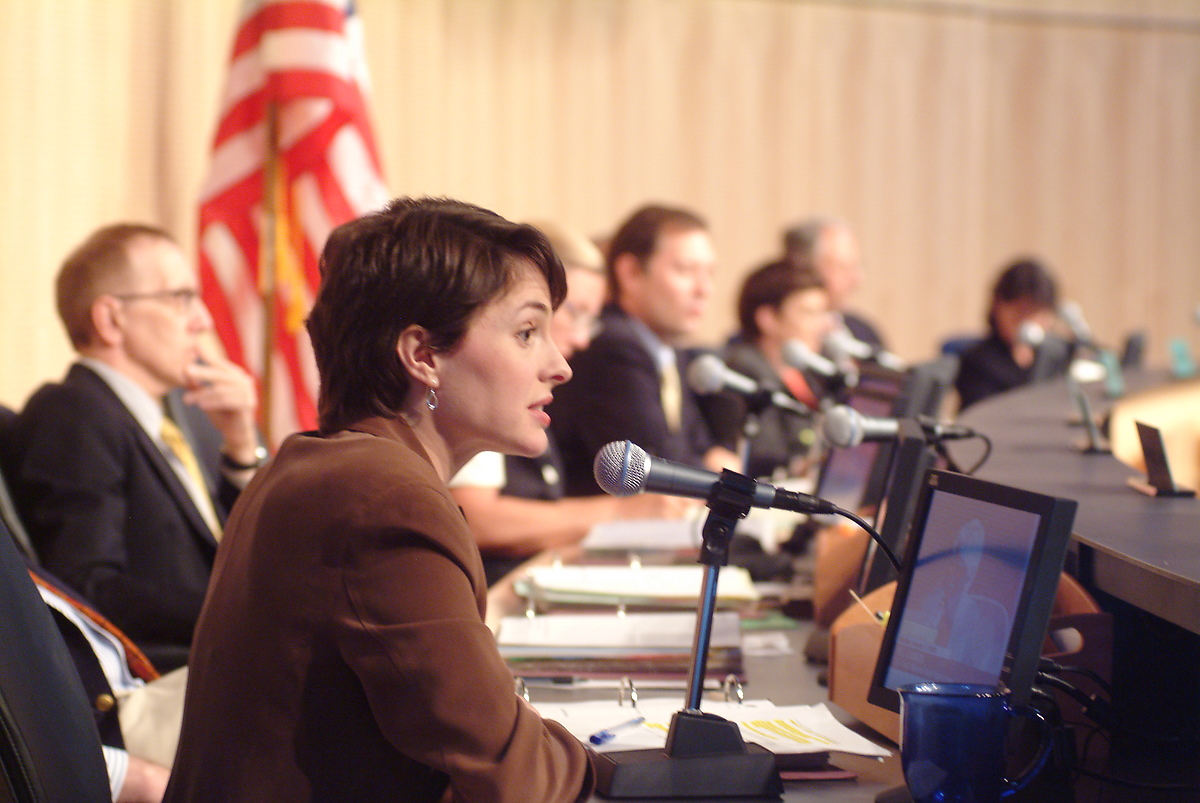
- Wills in 2003

Member of the Seattle City Council, Position 7
- In office January 10, 2000 – January 5, 2004
- Preceded by: Tina Podlodowski
- Succeeded by: David Della

Personal details
- Born: 1968 (age 57–58)
- Party: Democratic
- Spouse: Kobi Yamada
- Education: University of Washington (BA)

Heidi Wills (born 1968) is an American former politician who was a member of the Seattle City Council from 2000 to 2004. In 2019, she ran for city council in District 7 but lost in the general election.

== Education and early career ==
Wills earned her bachelor's degree in history of science, technology, and medicine from the University of Washington. From 1990 to 1991, she was the President of the Associated Students of the University of Washington, where she implemented the U-PASS as a replacement for the UW's struggling transportation program, which provided unlimited rides on regional public transit.

After graduating from UW, Wills worked as an aide to King County Executive Ron Sims.

== Seattle City Council ==
=== 1999 election ===
In May 1999, Seattle city councilmember Tina Podlodowski announced she would not seek reelection for Position 7. Wills ran for the open seat against five other candidates. In the September primary election, she came in second with 38% of the vote, with former councilmember Charlie Chong coming in first with 40%. Wills outraised Chong and all other candidates that cycle. In the general election, Wills defeated Chong, 55% to 45%.

=== Tenure ===
While in office, Wills was chair of the Energy and Environmental Policy Committee and vice-chair for the Housing, Human Services, Education, and Civil Rights Committee and the Transportation Committee.

While chair of the Energy Committee, Wills oversaw increases to Seattle City Light utility bills for top energy users to discourage high energy usage. Mayor Greg Nickels was against the "third tier" increases, stating the increases would effect low-income individuals, even though the majority of "third tier users" were not low income. Wills would successfully pass the rate increases for high energy users, with exemptions for low-income users. She later contacted the Seattle Ethics and Elections director over potential ethics violations regarding a letter Nickels sent to Seattle City Light customers disparaging the rate "third tier."

Wills' Energy committee also ushered a bill that would keep a surcharge, averaging $23 a month, for an extra two years to pay down City Light debt. Wills stated, "We're in unprecedented circumstances".

Wills voted to repeal the teen dance ordinance and promised to keep the poster ban repeal. Wills also sponsored legislation to switch green traffic lights to LED bulbs, saving the city millions in money and energy.

=== Strippergate ===
Former Washington state governor Albert Rosellini assisted the Colacurcios family by lobbying six members of the Seattle City Council and raising funds for three of the politicians. In June 2003, James Bush, a reporter for the North Seattle Sun, reported city council members Judy Nicastro, Jim Compton and Heidi Wills received a combined $36,000 worth of campaign donations from the Colacurcio family and their business associates. On June 16, 2003, in a 5–4 vote, the council approved the parking zoning changes allowing them to use their existing land for parking requested by the Colacurcios. Nicastro, Compton, and Wills all voted in favor on the expansion.

All councilmember returned the money, and Wills paid a $1,500 fine to the Seattle Ethics and Elections Commission.

=== 2003 election ===
Wills ran for reelection against three challengers. In the primary election, Wills placed first with 44% of the vote, and David Della, a director at United Way of King County, came in second with 34%. Della blamed Willis for the rate increases by releasing flyers and billboards of people yelling at their utility bills. Wills's campaign outraised Della's, fundraising over $250,000 and breaking the record $198,000 she raised in the 1999 election. Della defeated Willis in the general election, 65,324 votes (54%) to 55,620 (46%).

=== 2019 election ===
In April 2019, councilmember Mike O'Brien announced that he would not seek reelection for District 6, the fourth council member that cycle to decline running. Wills announced she would run for the open seat focusing her campaign on bring city hall "back to basics". Thirteen candidates ran in the primary, the most of any race that year. Wills came in second, with 21%, with Dan Strauss, former legislative aid to Councilmember Sally Bagshaw, coming in first with 34%.

Wills faced a finance complaint over the amount of in-kind donations an event space gave to Wills during an October fundraiser.

The election gained national attention after Amazon spent nearly $1.5 million on campaign contributions to Seattle Metropolitan Chamber of Commerce Political Action Committee, which supported Wills.

In the general election, Willis lost to Straus, 44% to 56%.

== Personal life ==
Wills married author Kobi Yamada in 2002 while she was in office. They have two children.

== Electoral history ==
Seattle City Council, Position 7, 1999 Primary
Party	Candidate	Votes	%
Nonpartisan	Charlie Chong	30,839	40.15%
Nonpartisan	Heidi Wills	29,330	38.18%
Nonpartisan	Thomas Whittemore	8,024	10.45%
Nonpartisan	George Freeman	3,071	4.00%
Nonpartisan	Elbert V. Brooks	3,031	3.95%
Nonpartisan	David W. Lawton	2,524	3.29%
Turnout		73,788	

Seattle City Council, Position 7, 1999 General
Party	Candidate	Votes	%
Nonpartisan	Heidi Wills	89,662	55.09%
Nonpartisan	Charlie Chong	73,085	44.91%
Turnout		162,747	

Seattle City Council, Position 7, 2003 Primary
Party	Candidate	Votes	%
Nonpartisan	Heidi Wills	47,985	43.64%
Nonpartisan	David J. Della	37,180	33.81%
Nonpartisan	Christal Wood	12,804	11.64%
Nonpartisan	Bob Hegamin	11,996	10.91%
Turnout		109,965	

Seattle City Council, Position 7, 2003 General
Party	Candidate	Votes	%
Nonpartisan	David J. Della	65,324	54.01%
Nonpartisan	Heidi Wills	55,620	45.98%
Turnout		120,944	

Seattle City Council, District 6, 2019 Primary
Party	Candidate	Votes	%
Nonpartisan	Dan Strauss	11,328	34.15%
Nonpartisan	Heidi Wills	7,048	21.25%
Nonpartisan	Sergio García	4,730	14.26%
Nonpartisan	Jay Fathi	4,367	13.16%
Nonpartisan	Kate Martin	1,137	3.43%
Nonpartisan	Jon Lisbin	1,063	3.20%
Nonpartisan	Jeremy Cook	829	2.50%
Nonpartisan	Melissa Hall	820	2.47%
Nonpartisan	Ed Pottharst	599	1.81%
Nonpartisan	John Peeples	452	1.36%
Nonpartisan	Joey Massa	299	0.90%
Nonpartisan	Terry Rice	287	0.87%
Nonpartisan	Kara Ceriello	146	0.44%
Nonpartisan	Write-in	67	0.20%
Turnout		34,207	

Seattle City Council, District 6, 2019 General
Party	Candidate	Votes	%
Nonpartisan	Dan Strauss	23,868	55.65%
Nonpartisan	Heidi Wills	18,799	43.83%
Turnout		44,399	59.37%
