= Tina Podlodowski =

American businesswoman and politician

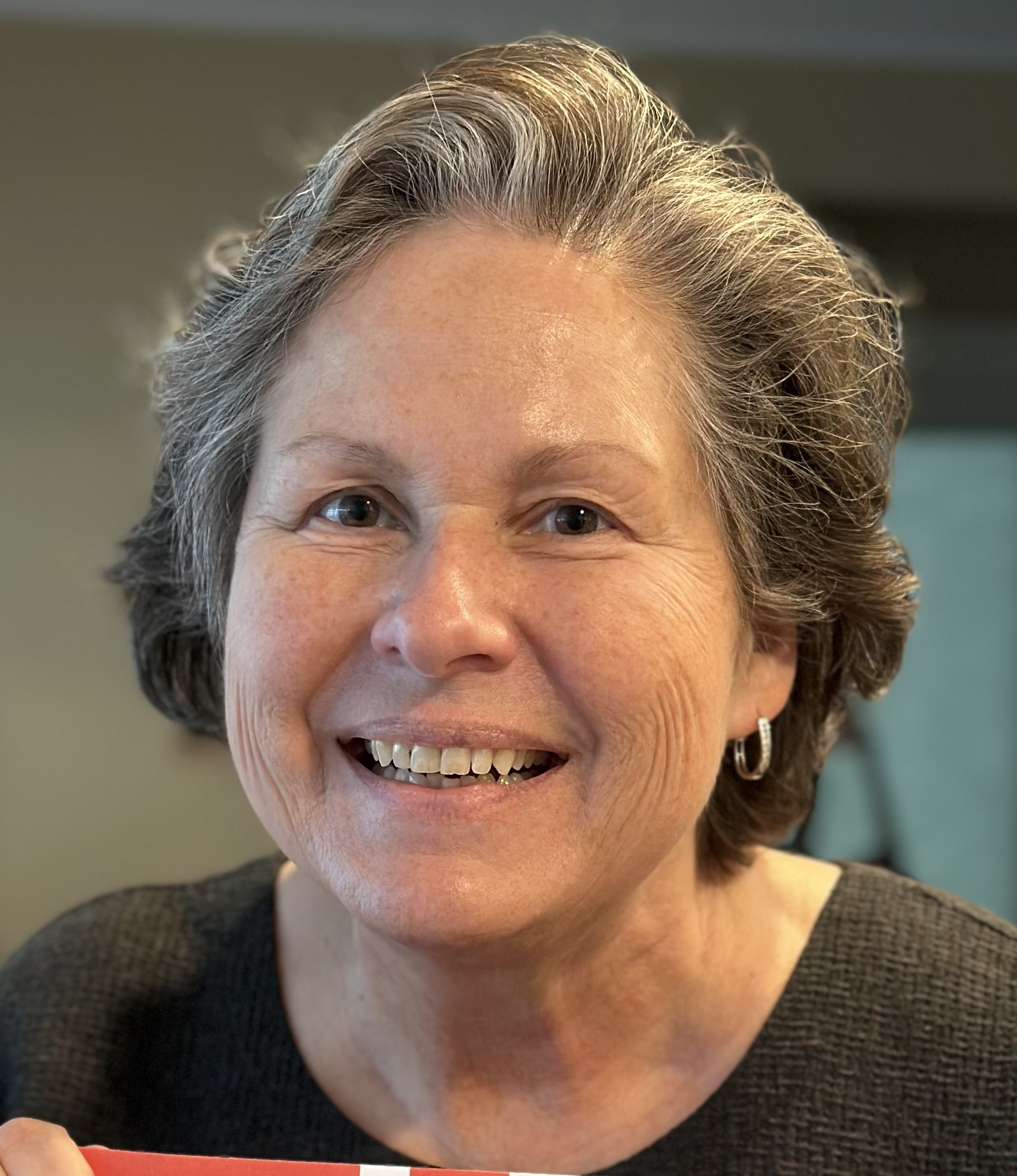
- Podlodowski in 2022

Chair of the Washington Democratic Party
- In office January 28, 2017 – January 28, 2023
- Preceded by: Jaxon Ravens
- Succeeded by: Shasti Conrad

Member of the Seattle City Council Position 7
- In office January 1, 1996 – January 1, 2000
- Preceded by: James Street
- Succeeded by: Heidi Wills

Personal details
- Born: August 26, 1960 (age 66)
- Party: Democratic
- Children: 3
- Education: University of Hartford (BA)

Tina M. Podlodowski (born 26 August 1960) is an American businesswoman and politician who served as the chair of the Washington State Democratic Party for three terms. A member of the Democratic Party, and previously served as a member of the Seattle City Council from 1995 to 1999.

== Education and Microsoft ==
Podlodowski graduated with a bachelor's degree in Computer Engineering from the University of Hartford. After graduation she worked with a number of technology start-ups, finally coming to Microsoft in 1984, where she managed groups in product marketing, domestic and international sales, and eventually Microsoft's global training business. She managed 8 business hubs in the U.S and four in Europe and Asia.

Podlodowski left Microsoft in 1993 a millionaire and became a principal investor in the purchase and renovation of Seattle's historic Paramount Theatre. She also joined the board of the Pride Foundation, a queer community foundation, and The Cities Project, which expanded internet access to areas of high poverty.

== Seattle City Council ==
Podlodowski ran for city council in 1995 for the seat vacated by retiring councilmember James Street. She came in second, behind state representative Jesse Wineberry, with both progressing to the general election. Podlodowski spent $75,000 of her own money and raised $250,000, a record at that time. Podlodowski defeat Wineberry in the general election in a landslide, 65% to 35%.

Podlodowski chaired the Neighborhoods and Neighborhood Planning, and the Public Safety, Health and Technology Committee. She shepherded the creation of the Office of Police Accountability as chair of the Public Safety committee. She voted to require landlords give 60-days notice for rent increases, toughened the city's anti-gay-discrimination statute, adding gender identity as a protected class and voted against imposing sanctions on the Burmese government.

She chose not to run for reelection in 1999, citing the split with her partner, Chelle Mileur, as the reason. Heidi Wills, an aide to King County Executive Ron Sims would defeat former councilmember Charlie Chong in the November election.

== Post-city council ==
In 2004, she was named the executive director of the Lifelong AIDS Alliance, a position that she held until 2007. She also worked with Big Brothers Big Sisters of Puget Sound, a role she would stay in for several years. In 2014, she advised Ed Murray, the Mayor of Seattle, on issues of policing.

In January 2016, Podlodowski announced that she would run against Republican Kim Wyman, the incumbent Secretary of State of Washington, in the 2016 election. Wyman defeated Podlodowski with 55% of the vote in a bruising race, centered on access to the ballot, postage paid ballots, same-day, registration, and pre-registration for 16 and 17 year olds.

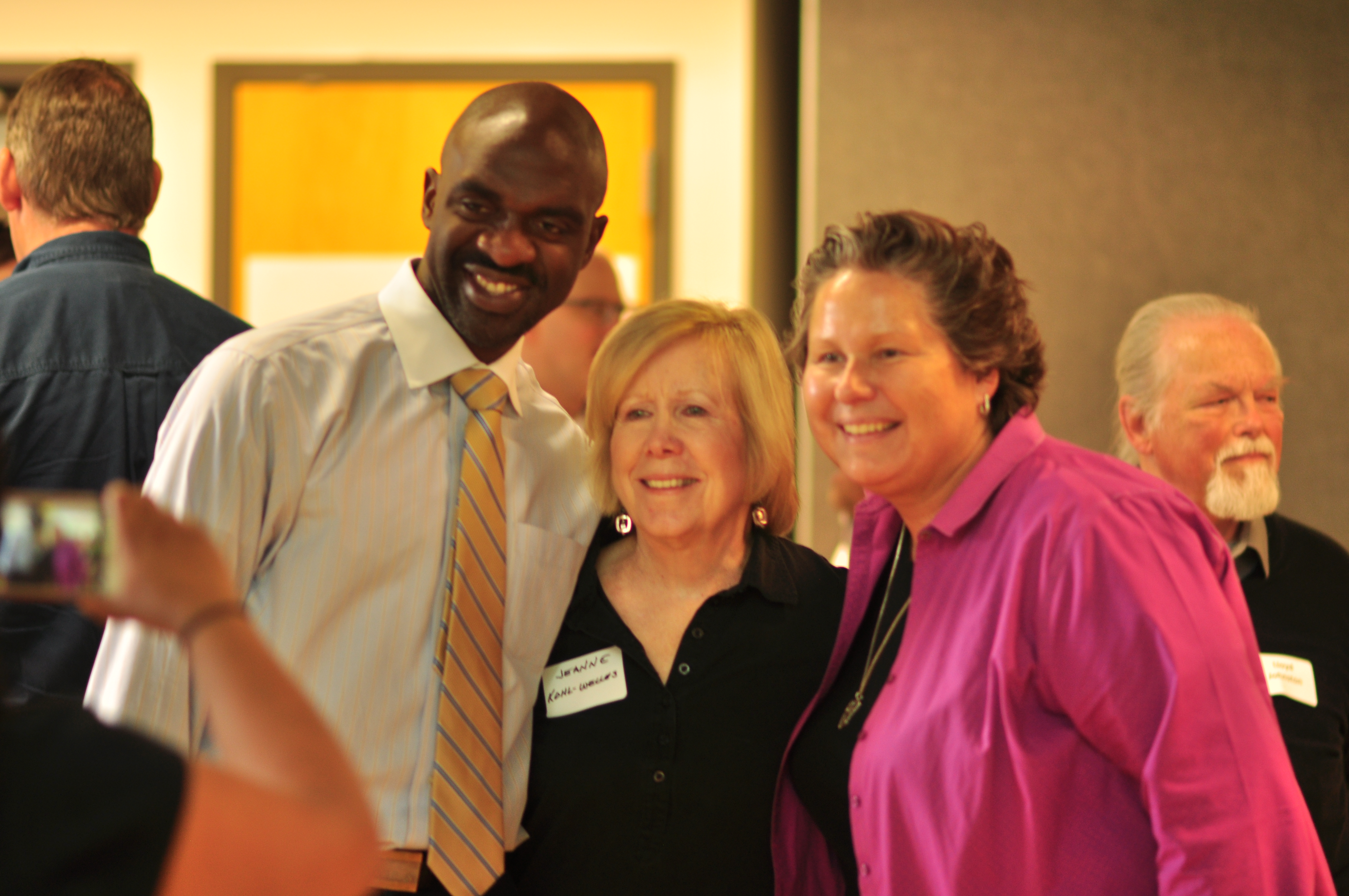
Podlodowski (right) in 2017 with New York Assemblyman and vice chair of the Democratic National Committee Michael Blake and King County Council member Jeanne Kohl-Welles.

In January 2017, Podlodowski was elected to be the chair of the Washington State Democratic Party, defeating incumbent Jaxon Ravens. As chair, the Washington Democrats increased their state House majority, took back the state Senate, won every statewide office, and flipped two Congressional districts. Podlodowski also served as a member of the Democratic National Committee, and chair of the DNC western states caucus as well as a member of the DNC executive committee. She did not run for another term in January 2023.

Podlodowski has served on the national boards of the Human Rights Campaign, The Task Force, INLGO and L-PAC, as well as the Pride Foundation. She has been honored for her service by the Urban League, and the LGBTQ Victory Fund.

Podlodowski is now semi-retired and focused on rural economic and organizing issues on the Olympic Peninsula.

== Personal life ==
Podlodowski is openly gay. She is married and has three children.

Party political offices
Preceded by Jaxon Ravens	Chair of the Washington Democratic Party; January 28, 2017 – January 28, 2023	Succeeded by Shasti Conrad
