= Jim Horn (politician) =

American politician

Speaker pro tempore of the Washington House of Representatives
- In office January 9, 1995 – January 13, 1997
- Preceded by: Ron Meyers
- Succeeded by: John Pennington

Member of the Washington Senate from the 41st district
- In office January 13, 1997 – January 12, 2005
- Preceded by: Emilio Cantu
- Succeeded by: Brian Weinstein

Member of the Washington House of Representatives from the 41st district
- In office January 9, 1989 – January 3, 1993
- Preceded by: Fred O. May
- Succeeded by: Ida Ballasiotes

Personal details
- Born: August 31, 1930 (age 95) Illinois, U.S.
- Party: Republican
- Spouse: Joyce Horn
- Children: 2
- Education: University of Illinois (BS)

James A. Horn (born August 31, 1930) is an American politician who served as a member of the Washington State Senate, representing the 41st district from 1997 to 2005. A member of the Republican Party, he previously served as a member of the Washington House of Representatives from 1989 to 1997.

== Personal life ==
Horn's wife is Joyce Horn. They have two children. Horn and his family live in Mercer Island, Washington.
