= Randy Revelle =

American politician (1941–2018)

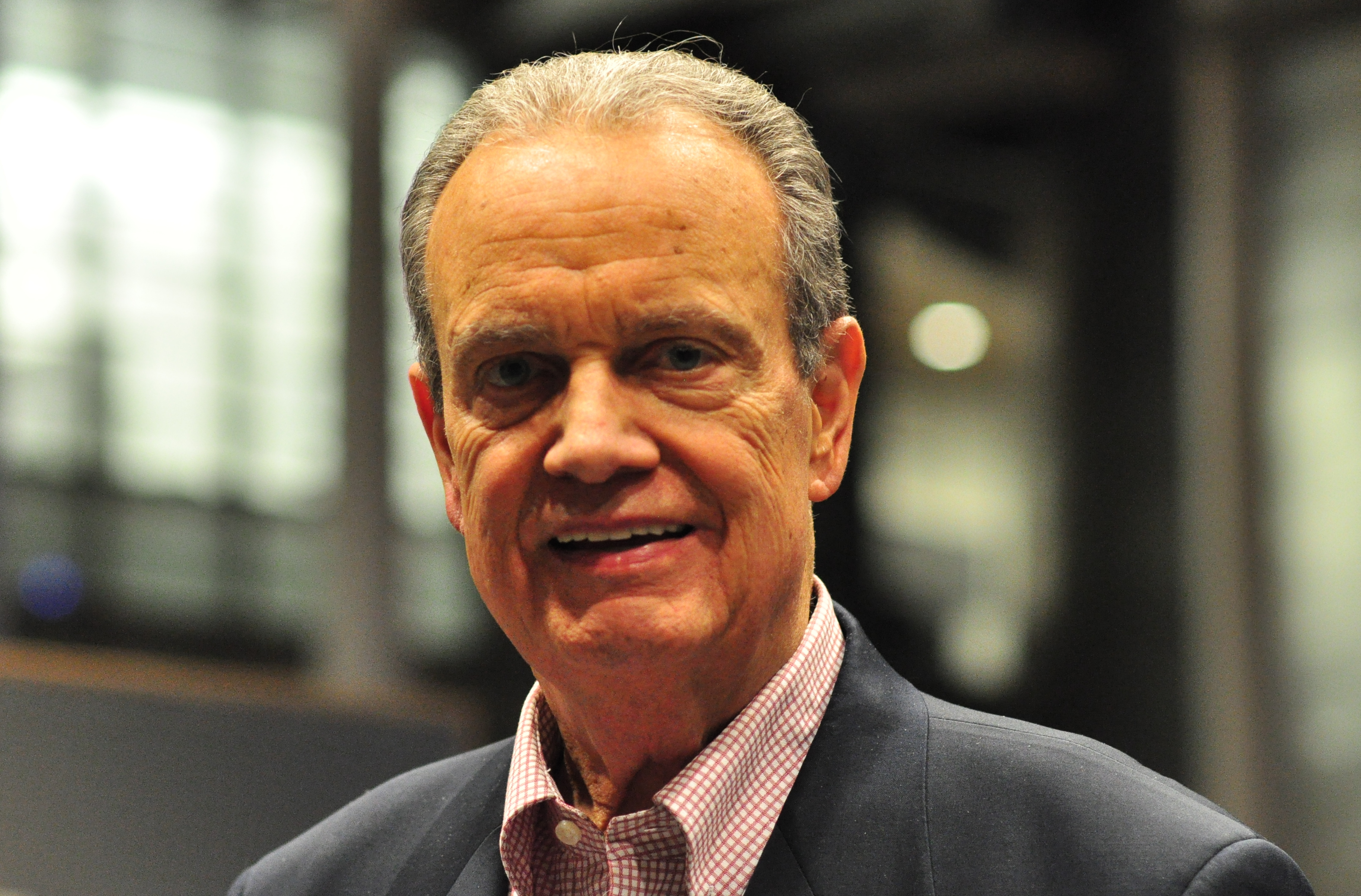
- Randy Revelle (2014)

3rd

King County Executive
- In office November 18, 1981 – January 1, 1986
- Preceded by: Ron Dunlap
- Succeeded by: Tim Hill

Member of Seattle City Council from Position 6
- In office January, 1974 – November 18, 1981
- Preceded by: George Cooley
- Succeeded by: Virginia Galle

Personal details
- Born: April 26, 1941 Seattle, Washington, U.S.
- Died: June 3, 2018 (aged 77) Seattle, Washington, U.S.
- Party: Democratic
- Spouse: Ann Carol Werelius
- Children: Lisa Revelle; Robin Revelle
- Education: Princeton University (BA); Woodrow Wilson School of Public and International Affairs; Harvard Law School (JD)
- Occupation: Politician
- Website: King County Executive

Randall Revelle (April 26, 1941- June 3, 2018) was the third King County Executive, having served from his election in November 1981 until January 1, 1986. He also served on the Seattle City Council from 1974 to 1981.

Revelle received some national attention when shortly after his election the Seattle Post Intelligencer disclosed that Revelle suffered from bipolar disorder. Revelle made no secret of his condition and, he said later, "friends, colleagues and the media" knew about it. After a close defeat for reelection in 1985, Revelle ran for mayor of Seattle in 1989, finishing third in the primary, ending his attempts at elective office.

Later, he served as senior vice president of the Washington State Hospital Association (WSHA). While at WSHA, Revelle also led the Washington Coalition for Insurance Parity that successfully advocated for Washington State's mental health parity law in 2005. Revelle and the coalition convinced the legislature to expand the law in 2007.

Revelle retired from WSHA in 2012. He died on June 3, 2018, and was remembered as "something of a hero in the field of mental health".
