= John A. Bagnariol =

American politician (1932–2009)

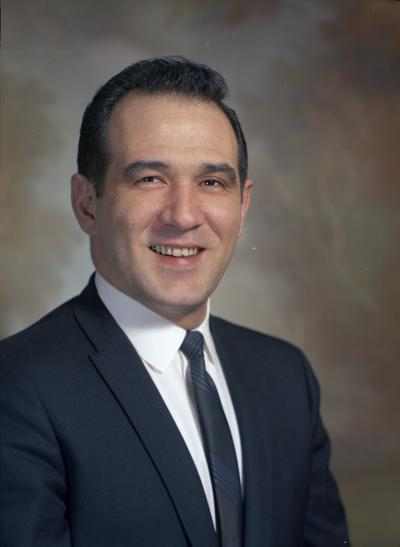
- Bagnariol in 1967

39th Speaker of the Washington House of Representatives
- In office January 10, 1977 – January 12, 1981 Serving with Duane Berentson (1979–1981)
- Preceded by: John L. O'Brien (acting)
- Succeeded by: William M. Polk

Member of the Washington House of Representatives
- In office January 8, 1973 – January 12, 1981
- Preceded by: Vaughn Hubbard
- Succeeded by: Michael E. Patrick
- Constituency: 11th
- In office January 9, 1967 – January 8, 1973
- Preceded by: Fred R. Mast
- Succeeded by: John L. O'Brien
- Constituency: 35th

Personal details
- Born: John Angelo Bagnariol; January 23, 1932 Renton, Washington, U.S.
- Died: December 6, 2009 (aged 77) Renton, Washington, U.S.
- Party: Democratic

John Angelo Bagnariol (January 23, 1932 – December 6, 2009) was an American politician in the state of Washington. He served in the Washington House of Representatives from 1977 to 1981 (from 1979 to 1981, he was co-speaker with Duane Berentson). He was Speaker of the House from 1965 to 1967.

Bagnariol was convicted of racketeering charges during the FBI investigation called GAMSCAM which was looking into bribery of state officials to expand gambling operations. he was found guilty and sentenced to five years in prison. (1980)
