= Janice Zahn =

American politician (born 1965)

- 梁浩婷

Member of the Washington House of Representatives from the 41st district
- Incumbent
- Assumed office January 21, 2025 Serving with My-Linh Thai
- Preceded by: Tana Senn

Member of the Bellevue City Council
- In office November 26, 2017 – March 28, 2025
- Preceded by: Ernie Simas
- Succeeded by: Claire Sumadiwirya

Personal details
- Born: Janice Ho Ting Leung; July 19, 1965 (age 61) Hong Kong
- Party: Democrat
- Spouse: Dwain Zahn (m. 1989)
- Children: 2
- Education: University of Washington (BS, MS, MA)

Janice Zahn (née Leung; Chinese: 梁浩婷; born July 19, 1965) is an American engineer and politician serving as a member of the Washington House of Representatives for the 41st district. She took office on January 21, 2025, after being appointed to succeed Tana Senn. She previously served on the Bellevue City Council from 2017-2025.

== Early life and education ==
Zahn was born in Hong Kong. She immigrated with her family to the United States when she was 10 years old.

She holds three degrees from the University of Washington: a BS in civil engineering, an MS in structural engineering and mechanics, and an MA in public administration.

== Career ==
Zahn has worked for the Port of Seattle in various roles since 2000. She has worked as chief engineer at the Port since 2022. Zahn also served as a member of the Bellevue Transportation Commission from 2013 to 2017.

After Vandana Slatter was appointed to the Washington House of Representatives and resigned from Bellevue City Council, Ernie Simas was appointed, but did not run for the seat. Zahn ran and was elected to the Bellevue City Council (position 5) in November 2017.

In January 2025, Zahn was unanimously appointed by the King County Council to serve as a state representative for the 41st district. She resigned her position on the Bellevue City Council effective March 28th and Claire Sumadiwirya was appointed to her seat. Zahn retained her seat in the house in the 2025 special election against Republican John Whitney.

== Personal life ==
Zahn has been married to her husband Dwain since 1989. They have two daughters.

Zahn has lived in Bellevue for over 30 years. She attends a Methodist church.
