= Duane Berentson =

American educator and politician (1928–2013)

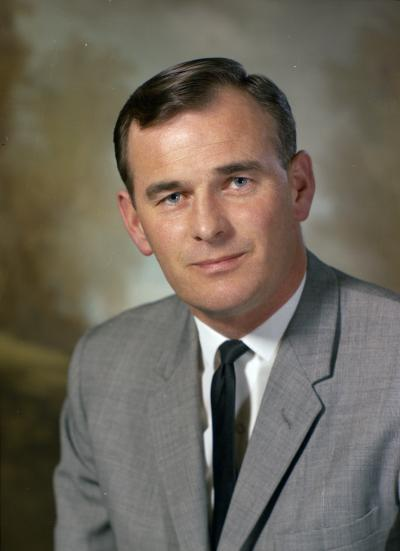
- Berentson in 1967

Washington Secretary of Transportation
- In office May 20, 1981 – January 27, 1993
- Governor: John Spellman; Booth Gardner; Mike Lowry
- Preceded by: William A. Bulley
- Succeeded by: Sid Morrison

40th Speaker of the Washington House of Representatives
- In office January 8, 1979 – January 12, 1981 Serving with John A. Bagnariol
- Preceded by: John A. Bagnariol
- Succeeded by: William M. Polk

Minority Leader of the Washington House of Representatives
- In office January 10, 1977 – January 8, 1979
- Preceded by: Irv Newhouse
- Succeeded by: Dick King

Member of the Washington House of Representatives from the 40th district
- In office January 14, 1963 – January 12, 1981
- Preceded by: Don Eldridge
- Succeeded by: Homer Lundquist

Personal details
- Born: Duane Lyman Berentson; November 22, 1928 Anacortes, Washington, U.S.
- Died: July 5, 2013 (aged 84) Mount Vernon, Washington, U.S.
- Party: Republican
- Education: University of Washington; Pacific Lutheran University

Duane Lyman Berentson (November 22, 1928 – July 5, 2013) was an American educator and politician.

Born in Anacortes, Washington, Berentson went to the University of Washington and then Pacific Lutheran University. He taught high school and was a coach and then was a securities broker. He served in the Washington House of Representatives 1962–1980, as a Republican, and then served as secretary of the Washington Department of Transportation 1981–1993. He died in Mount Vernon, Washington.
