= Dave Quall =

American politician (1936–2020)

Member of the Washington House of Representatives from the 40th district
- In office January 11, 1993 – January 10, 2011
- Preceded by: Harriet Spanel
- Succeeded by: Kristine Lytton

Personal details
- Born: David Spencer Quall; January 26, 1936 Bellingham, Washington, U.S.
- Died: November 12, 2020 (aged 84) Mount Vernon, Washington, U.S.
- Party: Democratic
- Education: Seattle Pacific University (MEd)

David Spencer Quall (January 26, 1936 – November 12, 2020) was an American educator and politician who served as a Democratic member of the Washington House of Representatives from the 40th district from 1993 to 2011.

== Biography ==
Quall attended Seattle Pacific University and earned a master's degree in Education Guidance and Counseling in 1974. He worked for thirty-eight years in education.

As a representative, he served as Chair of the Education Committee, and he has been a member of the Economic Development, Agriculture and Trade Committee.

His legislative priorities were to "help public schools meet the new high standards of Education Reform," "Increasing family-wage jobs and a healthy economic climate," and to make "home-ownership affordable for young families starting out".

In 2006 he faced Republican challenger Yoshe Revelle for Representative District No. 40, Position No. 1 and easily defeated him with the help of campaign manager Miriam Witt.

He died on November 12, 2020, at age 84.
