= David Della =

American politician (born 1955)

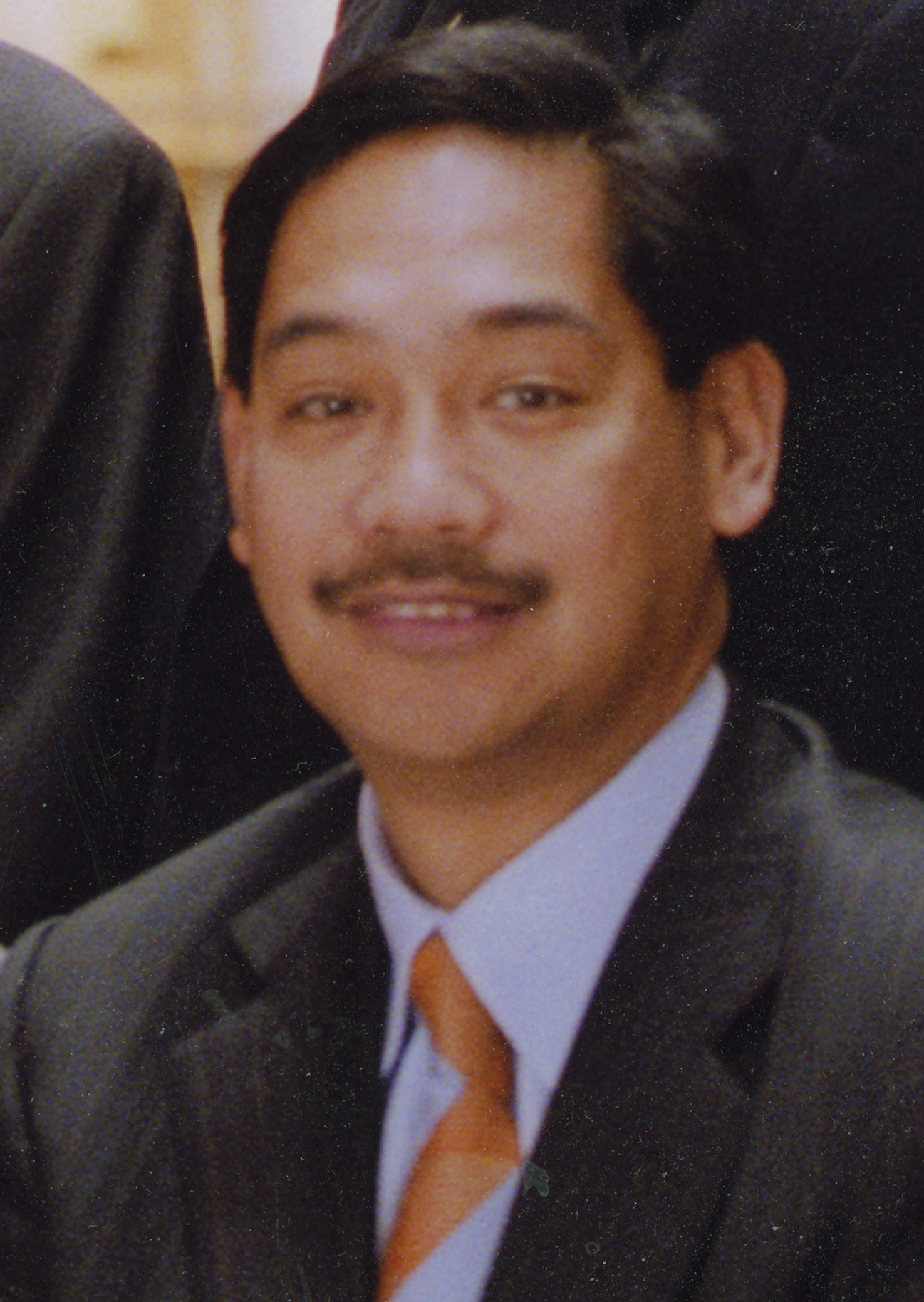
- David Della, 2006

Member of the Seattle City Council from District 7
- In office January 5, 2004 – January 3, 2008
- Preceded by: Heidi Wills
- Succeeded by: Tim Burgess

Chair, Seattle Human Rights Commission
- In office 1985–1989

Personal details
- Born: March 10, 1955 (age 71) Seattle, WA
- Party: Democratic
- Education: University of Washington

David Della (born March 10, 1955) is an American politician and labor activist from Seattle, Washington. In the 1970s and 1980s, Della was a union organizer fighting racial discrimination in the fish canary industry. He was elected to represent District 7 on the Seattle City Council in November 2003.

== Early life and labor activism ==
Della grew up in South Seattle and attended Cleveland High School. At age 16, he joined his father each summer in the Alaska canneries and helped organize local labor unions.

In the 1970s, Della organized with the Alaska Cannery Workers Association (ACWA) to fight racial discrimination against Asian workers in Alaskan canneries. He later was party to Wards Cove Packing Co. v. Atonio, a landmark United States Supreme Court case, which led in part to the passage of the Civil Rights Act of 1991.

In the 1980s, Della worked with members of ILWU Local 37 in the Philippines who were organizing against loyalists of the Ferdinand Marcos' dictator regime. After the assassination of Silme Domingo and Gene Viernes in 1981, reformers, including Della, rose through the ranks of Local 37. In 1987, Della became a national organizer with IBU.

From 1989 to 1993, he served as Seattle mayor Norm Rice's deputy chief of staff, and from 1993 to 1999, he was director of the state's Commission on Asian Pacific American Affairs. From 1999 to 2003, Della was the community affairs director for the United Way of King County.

Della attended the University of Washington.

== 2003 Seattle City Council elections ==
In 2003, Della ran against incumbent Heidi Wills, who headed the council's energy committee. Della focused his campaign on energy bills increasing, after Seattle City Light raised rates four times in a year. Della blamed Willis for the rate increases by releasing flyers and billboards of people yelling at their utility bills.

Della defeated Willis in the November General Election, 65,324 votes (54%) to 55,620 (46%).

== Seattle City Council (2003-2007) ==
Della was chair of the Parks, Neighborhoods, and Education Committee from 2004 to 2006 and the Education, Libraries and Labor Committee from 2006 to 2008.

During his time as chair of the Parks, Neighborhoods, and Education Committee, he oversaw the passage of the sports complex expansion at Magnuson Park, which drew complaints from locals and organizations surrounding the park. The council would pass a bill on an 8–1 vote that would open the various fields in a phased system. Della would be the lone no vote, stating, "In the master plan that the council passed 9–0, we committed to seven lighted fields. It is incumbent on the city to honor that agreement and move forward.”

Della initially voted to replace the Alaskan Way Viaduct with a tunnel and open waterfront but would later oppose the plan. Della wanted to repair the viaduct stating, "I can't stand by and wait for gold-plated alternatives. We have the money today, and we have to get working tomorrow." The viaduct would eventually be torn down and replaced with the State Route 99 tunnel, which opened in 2019.

== 2007 Seattle City Council election ==
In 2007, Della announced his reelection bid, and his primary challenger was former Seattle Ethics and Elections chair Tim Burgess (politician). Similar to his previous election campaign, Della was aggressive in attacking his opponent, stating that Burgess was too conservative for Seattle. Della also attacked environmental groups for endorsing Burgess, insinuating that race played a factor in their decision.

Della would lose in the November General Election, garnering only 45,932 votes (35%) to Burgess' 84,333 votes (65%).

After the election, Della paid the city $500 for making automated phone calls without indicating who paid for the calls during the election.
