= Charlie Chong =

American politician (1926–2007)

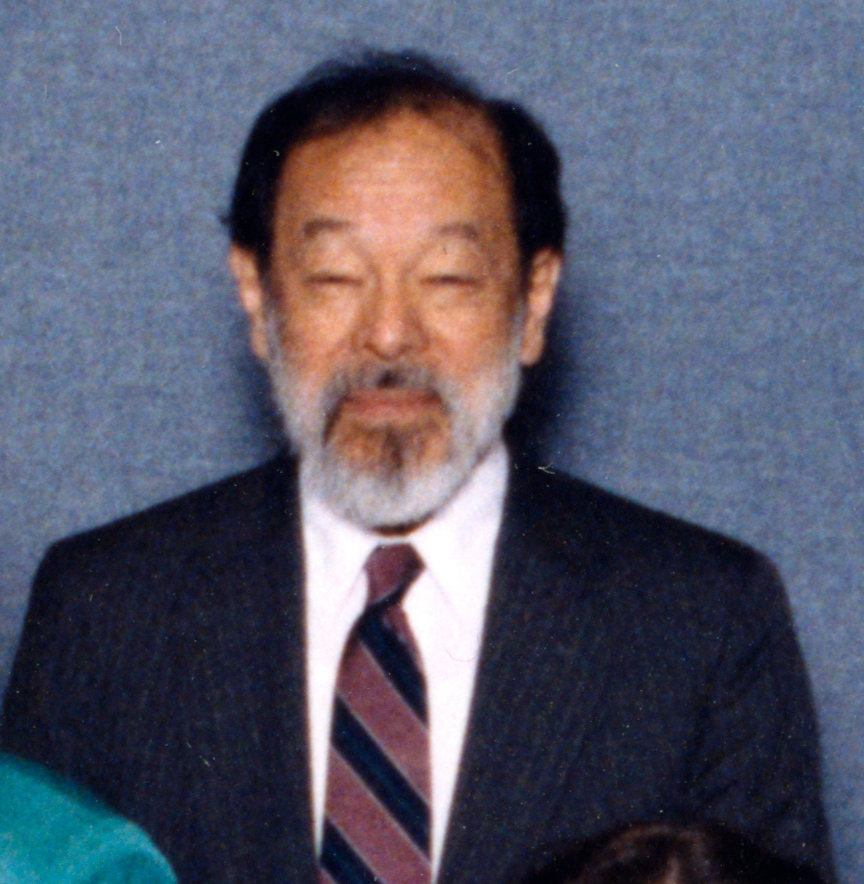
- Charlie Chong, 1997

Member of the Seattle City Council from Position 6
- In office November 12, 1996 – January 3, 1998
- Preceded by: Tom Weeks
- Succeeded by: Nick Licata

Personal details
- Born: October 13, 1926 Maui
- Died: April 26, 2007 (aged 80) Seattle, Washington
- Party: Democratic
- Spouse: Mary Pearson
- Education: Georgetown University (BS)

Charlie Chong (October 13, 1926 – April 26, 2007) was a populist Seattle political figure and activist on behalf of the Pike Place Market and against the marginalization of West Seattle. Chong was a perennial candidate but did serve on the Seattle City Council for one year after winning a special election in 1996.

== Early life and career ==
On October 13, 1926, Chong was born on the island of Maui, then part of the Territory of Hawaii (now the State of Hawaii). He was the sixth of 13 children with his father working as a bookkeeper on sugar plantations.

Chong graduated from Honolulu's St. Louis High School and was editor of the school's newspaper. After high school, he served in the United States Army, then studied at Georgetown University on the G.I. Bill, where he received a Bachelor of Science degree in Foreign Service in 1951. After graduating, he was drafted into the Korean War, serving in the United States Air Force as an intelligence officer.

Chong left the military in 1954 and went to work with one of his Georgetown University professors, who was studying international law. He then moved to Minnesota and worked as a canning company manager, later becoming the business's vice president. In 1964, Chong moved back to Washington, D.C. to work on the VISTA program, a Johnson era anti-poverty program, recruiting volunteers across the country. He then took a job as the regional operations chief for the Office of Economic Opportunity, the job that brought him to Seattle in 1970 and was in that role until his retirement in 1983.

== Activism and political career ==
After retiring, Chong came to public notice as a neighborhood advocate successfully blocking a development project in a West Seattle ravine. That led to his appointment to a citizens committee working on the 1989 King County open-space bond issue and his appointment as president of the Admiral Community Council from 1989 to 1993. Chong was also an outspoken critic of Mayor Norm Rice's plan to concentrate populations in urban villages, including West Seattle.

=== Elections ===
In 1995, Chong ran as a protest candidate for City Council, advancing to the general election against incumbent Margaret Pageler. He ran as a reform candidate, critiquing the council's support of downtown business interests. In the general election, Pageler defeated Chong in a landslide, 69% to 31%.

Although Chong lost, he ran for city council in the special election the following year to fill the vacancy left by Tom Weeks. He again ran on a populist platform against the council's focus on downtown projects and not average citizen's problems, like potholes. In the September primary, Chong came in first among eight challengers with 24% of the vote, advancing to the general election with LGBT advocate and attorney Bob Rohan, who earned 21% of the vote. Chong and Rohan agreed on some issues, like focusing spending on neighborhoods and not downtown, but disagreed on key issues, such as how to respond to homelessness and civilian oversight of police. In the November general election, Chong defeated Rohan 57% to 43% and took office when the election was certified on November 12, 1996.

In 1997, midway through his first year in office, Chong ran for mayor because "we’re riding an upswelling of resentment that might not be here two years from now." In the September primary, Chong came in second, with 21%, and advanced to the general election with developer and former dean of the University of Washington School of Architecture Paul Schell, who earned 28%. Chong and Schell disagreed on how to address the population increase, with Chong focusing on keeping neighborhoods intact and development outside the city, while Schell focused on compact urban living. In the November general election, Schell defeated Chong, 56% to 44%. Chong would refuse to concede the election until three years after his defeat.

In 1999, Chong ran for the open city council seat after councilmember Tina Podlodowski chose not to run for reelection. In the September primary election, Chong came in first with 40% of the vote, advancing to the general election with King County Council aide Heidi Wills, who earned 38%. During the campaign, some media outlets called Chong "eccentric" while The Stranger, referred to him as a "lunatic" and a "nutcase." In the November general election, Wills defeated Chong 55% to 45%. Chong and his team would later blame his loss on a six-inch metal spike that was lodged in the base of his skull that was found after the election.

In 2001, Chong again ran for mayor of Seattle, stating, "I don't think I can beat Paul. He's far too popular. But I'd like to see what it feels like to run for mayor without a metal spike embedded in my skull." During the campaign, Chong announced that he was diagnosed with pancreatic cancer but that he would continue his campaign. Chong came in a distant fourth place in the September primary election, with 6.8% of the vote.

=== Tenure ===
During his brief tenure in the Seattle City Council, Chong chaired the Personnel, Organization, and Performance Committee. He governed as a populist, vocalizing the fear and anxiety of citizens who felt unheard by the council. Chong was unpopular among establishment figures on the council, who privately called him a "blowhard and a nitpicker," and had few allies in the system.

At the beginning of Chong's tenure, a massive snowstorm hit Seattle, and he responded by pushing a deal to buy snowplows at a discounted rate. The council and other city leaders at first blocked the deal by forcing studies on the purchase, which led to the city of Bellevue purchasing the cheap snowplows. After Chong led the public outcry over the deal, the council reversed course, blaming Chong's "bullying" as the reason for the change.

== Personal life ==
Chong was a Roman Catholic and was an usher at Holy Rosary Church in West Seattle. Chong married his longtime partner Mary Pearson in 1999 before he had heart surgery; they had no children together. He died in Seattle's Providence Hospital on April 26, 2007.
