= Floyd C. Miller =

American politician (1902–1985)

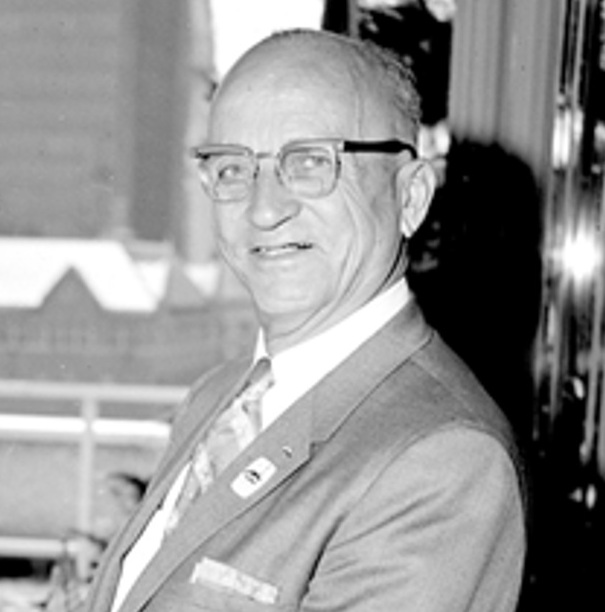
- Miller as mayor in 1969. Seattle Municipal Archives.

46th Mayor of Seattle Acting
- In office March 23, 1969 – December 1, 1969
- Preceded by: James d'Orma Braman
- Succeeded by: Wesley C. Uhlman

Member of the Seattle City Council
- In office 1956–1969

Personal details
- Born: January 11, 1902
- Died: December 10, 1985 (aged 83)

Floyd C. Miller (January 11, 1902 – December 10, 1985) was an American politician who served six terms in the Washington House of Representatives beginning in 1937, and on the Seattle City Council 1956–1969 (serving as Council President from 1962–64 and 1968–69), after which he was interim mayor of Seattle, Washington for nine months between March 23, 1969 and December 1, 1969, filling out the term of James d'Orma Braman, who had been appointed Assistant Secretary of the United States Department of Transportation. During his short mayoral tenure, Seattle's first Major League Baseball team, the Pilots began play, but would move after only one season to Milwaukee to become the Brewers.

Miller died on December 10, 1985.

== Notes ==
Political offices
Preceded by James d'Orma Braman	Mayor of Seattle; 1969–1969	Succeeded by Wesley C. Uhlman
