= Fred Jarrett =

American politician from Washington

Member of the Washington Senate from the 41st district
- In office January 12, 2009 – December 18, 2009
- Preceded by: Brian Weinstein
- Succeeded by: Randy Gordon

Member of the Washington House of Representatives from the 41st district
- In office January 8, 2001 – January 12, 2009
- Preceded by: Mike Wensman
- Succeeded by: Marcie Maxwell

Personal details
- Party: Democratic (2007–present)
- Other political affiliations: Republican (before 2007)
- Spouse: Susan
- Education: Washington State University, Seattle University

Fred Jarrett is a member of the Washington State Public Disclosure Commission. His appointment to the commission, announced in April 2019 by Washington Governor Jay Inslee, noted that he had recently retired as Senior Deputy of the King County Executive, which he joined with the incoming administration of Dow Constantine in 2010. Jarrett was elected in 2008 as a Democratic member of the Washington State Senate, and represented the 41st district from January 2009 to the time he joined Constantine's administration. He announced that he would run for the State Senate in December 2007 after switching his political party affiliation. Prior to that election, he served in the Washington House of Representatives as a Republican for four terms, starting in 2001. His switch in political party affiliation at the time was noted as an example of "[t]he loss of GOP power in the affluent suburbs [that] has been one of the state’s major post-millennial political trends." Earlier in his political career, Jarrett was a member of the Mercer Island City Council, which he joined in 1978, serving as mayor for two terms in the 1980s.
