= Washington Department of Children, Youth, and Families =

State agency of Washington

Washington Department of Children, Youth, and Families (DCYF) is state-level social services agency in Washington. It was created by House Bill 1661, which was signed by Governor Jay Inslee on July 6, 2017.

Beginning January 15, 2025, Tana Senn will serve as the director. Prior to Senn, Ross Hunter led the agency.
