= Tom Weeks =

American politician

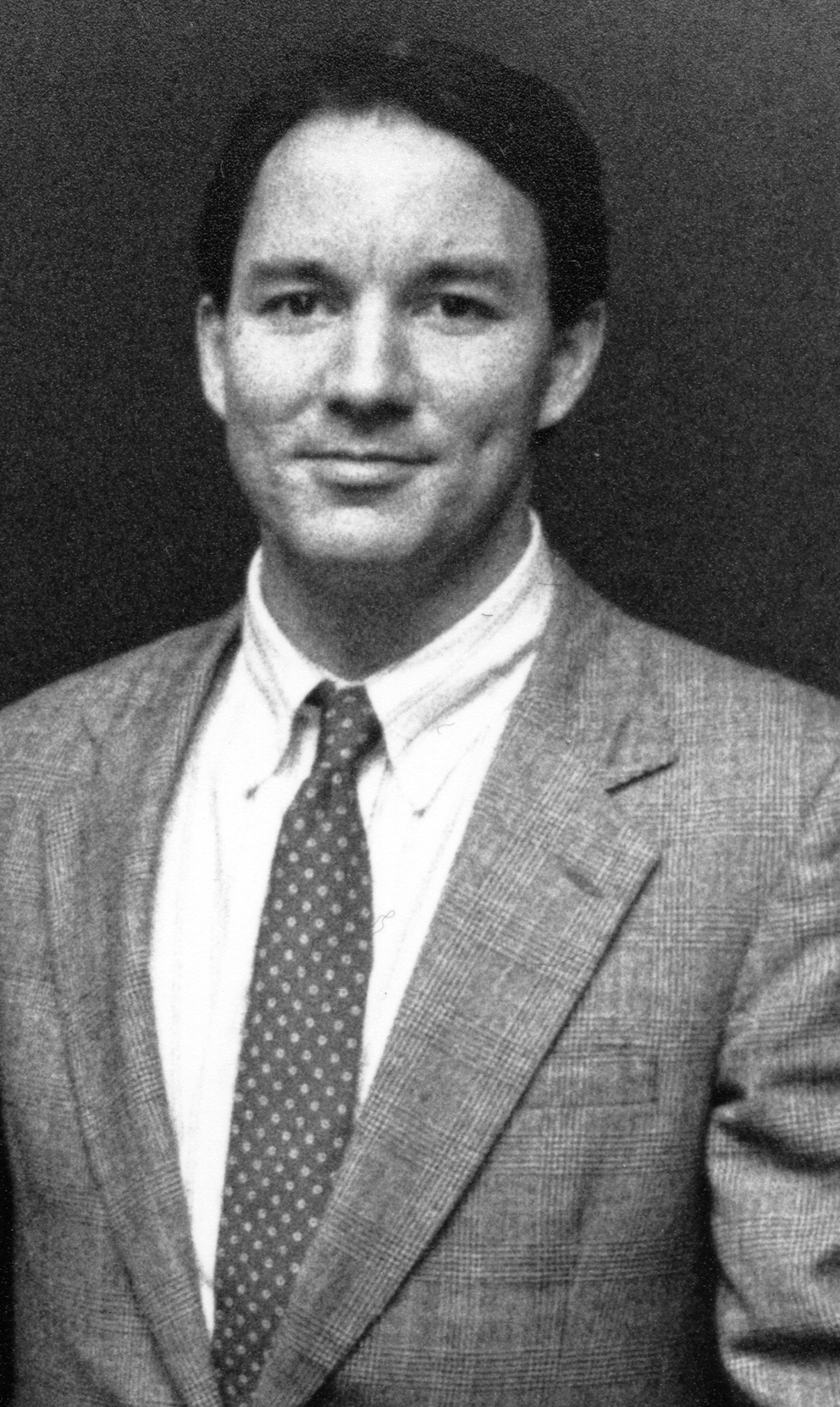

Member of the Seattle City Council from Position 6
- In office January 1, 1990 – August 2, 1996
- Preceded by: Virginia Galle
- Succeeded by: Charlie Chong

Personal details
- Born: Seattle, WA
- Party: Democratic
- Education: Middlebury College (BA); Harvard University (MA, PhD)

Tom Weeks is a former Seattle City Council member from 1990 until he resigned in 1996.

== Early life and education ==
Weeks was born and raised in West Seattle. He is a graduate of Harvard Kennedy School graduate program, where he was also a teacher's assistant. Before his running for city council, he owned a conflict-negotiation consulting business.

== Seattle city council ==
=== Elections ===
In 1989, Weeks ran for Seattle city council for Position 6 against incumbent Virginia Galle. In the September primary election, he and Galle advanced to the general with 30% and 43% of the vote, respectively. Galle accused Weeks of padding his resume when he claimed he taught at Harvard, "He talks about teaching when he means teaching assistant." Weeks defended his experience, saying he did teach courses until Harvard released a statement saying he was not on the faculty and did not teach complete five-month courses. Weeks said Galle was too much of an outsider and ineffective at coalition building. In the general election, Weeks defeated Gale, 55% to 45%, and he outspent her on a 2-1 ratio.

Weeks ran for reelection in 1993 and faced seven challengers. In the September primary, Weeks came in first with over 63% of the vote, with businesswoman Pam Roats coming in second with 16%. Weeks ran on his record and his overwhelming win in the primary, while Roats attacked him over a $10,000 ethics complaint against Weeks' from the Ethics and Elections Commission. In the general election, Weeks defeated Roats, 65% to 35%.

=== Tenure ===
During his tenure, Weeks was chair of the Housing and Human Services, Finance, and Personnel and Labor Policy Committees. As chair of the Finance committee, he oversaw the merger of the community development and human services departments, and, separately, the melding of the comptroller's and treasurer's offices. Weeks was active in the budget process and used savings for increased "...investment(s) in human capital and human services as crime prevention.

In 1993, a city employee lodged an ethics complaint against Weeks for mailing a newsletter at city expense to 35,000 households. He denied that he broke any laws, but there was a perspective that he had, saying "The perception here was almost as important as the facts." Weeks repaid the city $10,256.19 over three installments.

Weeks announced he would resign from the council, effective August 2, 1996, to take a job as Seattle School District's director of human resources.

== Post-council ==
After working at the Seattle School District, Weeks became chairman of the board of the Seattle Monorail Project. Voters rejected the Monorail project initiative, on a 2–1 margin due financial problems. Project leaders, including Weeks, resigned after the vote.
