= Fred A. Veroske =

American politician

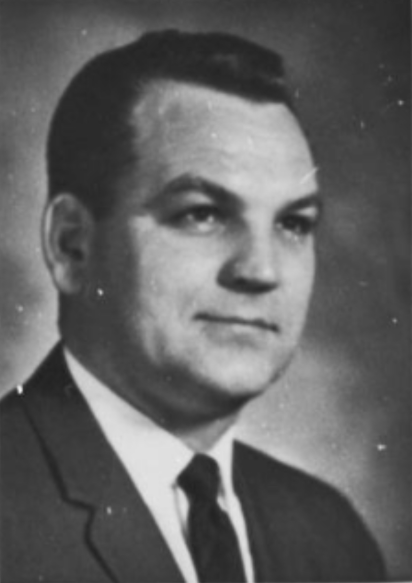
- Veroske in 1967

Member of the Washington House of Representatives from the 41st district
- In office 1965–1967

Member of the Washington House of Representatives from the 42nd district
- In office 1967–1971

Personal details
- Born: November 29, 1928 Chelan, Washington, U.S.
- Died: May 7, 2008 (aged 79)
- Party: Republican
- Education: California College of Mortuary Science

Fred A. Veroske (November 29, 1928 – May 7, 2008) was an American politician. He served as a Republican member for the 41st and 42nd district of the Washington House of Representatives.

== Life and career ==
Veroske was born in Chelan, Washington. He attended California College of Mortuary Science.

Veroske served in the Washington House of Representatives from 1965 to 1971.

Veroske died on May 7, 2008, at the age of 79.
