= Brian Weinstein =

American politician

Member of the Washington Senate from the 41st district
- In office January 10, 2005 – January 12, 2009
- Preceded by: Jim Horn
- Succeeded by: Fred Jarrett

Personal details
- Party: Democratic

Brian Weinstein is a former Washington State Senator representing the 41st Legislative District.

== Background ==
After a long career as an attorney representing mesothelioma victims nationwide, Weinstein was elected to the Washington State Senate in 2004 to represent the 41st legislative district of Washington (Seattle suburbs) as a Democrat, defeating a 16-year incumbent Republican legislator. Weinstein lives on Mercer Island with his wife (Gaylene Vaden) and children Trevor, Arielle and Madeleine. He graduated with honors from the University of Wisconsin–Madison with a BA in Economics in 1976. He then went on to attend the University of Texas Austin School of Law to earn his JD in 1981. He also served as the former Director of the Pike Place Market Foundation Board. In February 2009, Brian was appointed by Governor Gregoire to the Public Stadium Authority. After retiring from the legislature in 2008, Weinstein resumed the practice of law.

Weinstein is currently the founder of the Weinstein Caggiano law firm in Seattle, Washington, which specializes in mesothelioma cases (involving people exposed to asbestos during their careers) and life-threatening rideshare cases, where drivers and/or riders are attacked in the Uber or Lyft cars they use.

== Legislative history ==
Weinstein served as Assistant Majority Whip from 2005 to 2006. After only two years in the Senate, Weinstein was chosen by the Senate Democratic Caucus to chair the Consumer Protection and Housing Committee. Weinstein is a member of the Judiciary Committee and the Early Learning and K-12 Education Committee. In 2005 at the Governor's request, Weinstein prime sponsored the Washington Learns bill, SB 5441. Signed into law, the legislation required a comprehensive study of Washington's structure and funding of public education, including recommendations for reform. Many of the recommendations have been adopted. In 2007, he prime sponsored and helped pass the Insurance Fair Conduct Act which made it unlawful for insurers to unreasonably deny a claim for coverage or payment of benefits. The insurance industry and others tried to repeal the legislation through Referendum 67, but the voters rejected the insurance industries efforts to repeal Weinstein's law. In 2008, Weinstein sponsored and passed SB 6381 which imposes a fiduciary duty on mortgage brokers (requiring mortgage brokers to act in the best interest of the borrower). Weinstein was also instrumental in securing state funding for the Washington State Holocaust Education Resource Center.

The Legislature failed to pass Weinstein's Homebuyer's Bill of Rights which would have held builders liable for shoddy construction. In 2007 and 2008 the bill passed the Senate but was never brought to a vote before the full House of Representatives. In 2008, Weinstein announced he would return to the practice of law and not run for re-election.

== Awards and recognition ==
Weinstein is the recipient of the 2008 Fuse "Sizzle" award for "Favorite Gunslinger." The Washington-based online advocacy group honored Weinstein for his "four years as a fearless and relentless crusader for consumer protection."

- 2008 Poverty Action Leadership Award
- 2007 Humane Society of the United States state legislator of the year award
- 2006 Outstanding Legislator, Children's Alliance
- 2005 City of Renton Award; Washington Association of School Administrators Community Leadership Award
- Planned Parenthood award for exceptional commitment and effort
