= Emilio Cantu =

American politician

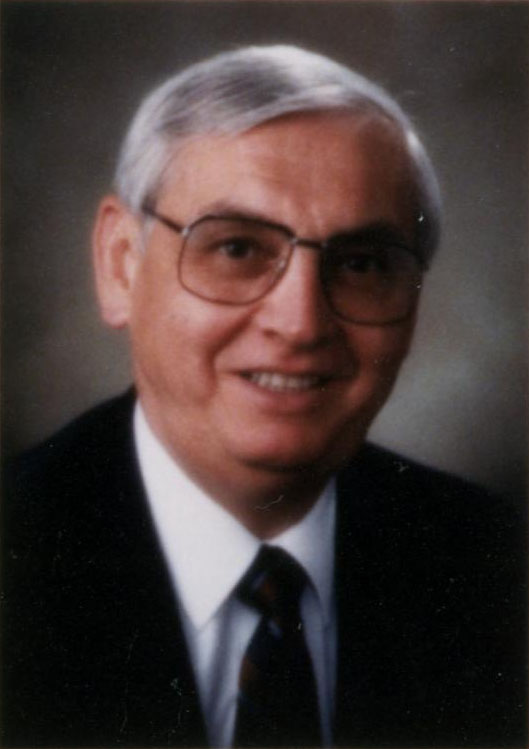
- Cantu in 1987

Member of the Washington Senate from the 41st district
- In office January 14, 1985 – January 13, 1997
- Preceded by: George W. Clarke
- Succeeded by: Jim Horn

Member of the Washington House of Representatives from the 41st district
- In office January 12, 1981 – January 14, 1985
- Preceded by: Ron Dunlap
- Succeeded by: Joseph L. Williams

Personal details
- Born: May 10, 1926
- Died: April 13, 2017 (aged 90) Bellevue, Washington, U.S.
- Party: Republican
- Spouse: Josephine Cantu (d. 2014)
- Education: University of Texas
- Occupation: Engineer

Emilio Cantu (May 10, 1926 – April 13, 2017) was an American politician and engineer in the state of Washington. He served in the Washington House of Representatives and Washington State Senate as a Republican. Before his time in the legislature, he had a long career with Boeing as an Engineering Design Manager. He graduated from the University of Texas at Austin with a Bachelor of Science degree and was a veteran of the United States Navy.

== Career ==
During Cantu's career with Boeing, he designed the shelter structures used for transporting the Saturn V components along the interstate.
