= Harriet Spanel =

American politician from Washington

Member of the Washington House of Representatives from the 40th district
- In office 1987–1993
- Succeeded by: Dave Quall

Member of the Washington Senate from the 40th district
- In office 1993–2009

Personal details
- Born: January 15, 1939 Audubon, Iowa
- Died: February 2, 2016 (aged 77) Bellingham, Washington
- Party: Democratic
- Occupation: Politician

Harriet Rosa (née Albertsen) Spanel (January 15, 1939 – February 2, 2016) was an American politician, public servant, and community volunteer in Washington State.

Spanel was born in Audubon, Iowa, as the second of four siblings and grew up on a farm. She graduated from Iowa State University with a bachelor's degree in mathematics in 1961, where she met her husband Leslie E. Spanel. She worked as a computer programmer for the Atomic Energy Commission at the Ames National Laboratory in Ames, Iowa.

In 1964, Spanel, her husband 'Les', and their family relocated to Bellevue, Washington to pursue a career opportunity with Boeing. In 1968, the family moved again to Bellingham, Washington where her husband would serve as a longtime member of the faculty at Western Washington University's Physics Department and Spanel would begin her involvement in local government. The couple had three children and became civically involved in the Sehome neighborhood.

Spanel served on the Bellingham Planning Commission and on the Bellingham Parks and Recreation Commission. She was also involved with voter registration efforts and studied at Fairhaven College at Western Washington University for a time where her political aspirations grew into an eventual run for office in 1986. Spanel served as a Democrat in the Washington House of Representatives from 1987 to 1993 and in the Washington State Senate from 1993 to 2009. She was the Democratic nominee for Washington's 2nd congressional district in 1994 to succeed retiring Democratic incumbent Al Swift; she lost to former state senator Jack Metcalf with 45.34% of the vote. At the time of her retirement from politics in 2009, Spanel served as the chairwoman of the Democratic caucus for the Washington State Senate.

Following the passing of her husband, Professor Leslie E. Spanel, in 2002, Harriet would advocate for and fund the preservation and improvement of Western Washington University's planetarium which would later be renamed in Les' honor. Throughout her career, Spanel strongly advocated for environmental and sustainability efforts, participated in the nuclear freeze movement, championed the local fishing industry, and supported public transit including the Washington State Ferry system. Spanel is remembered for her quiet, inclusive approach to governance and insistence on being known as 'Harriet' to her colleagues and constituents alike.

Spanel died peacefully at her home in Bellingham, Washington on February 2, 2016, at the age of 77.
