= Fred R. Mast =

American politician

Member of the Washington House of Representatives from the 35th district
- In office January 12, 1953 – January 9, 1967
- Preceded by: Ray L. Olsen
- Succeeded by: John A. Bagnariol

Personal details
- Born: Fred Richard Mast; December 8, 1896 Superior, Wisconsin, U.S.
- Died: October 31, 1986 (aged 89) Seattle, Washington, U.S.
- Party: Republican

Fred Richard Mast (December 8, 1896 – October 31, 1986) was an American politician in the state of Washington. He served in the Washington House of Representatives from 1953 to 1967 for district 35.
