= James d'Orma Braman =

American politician (1901–1980)

James Braman
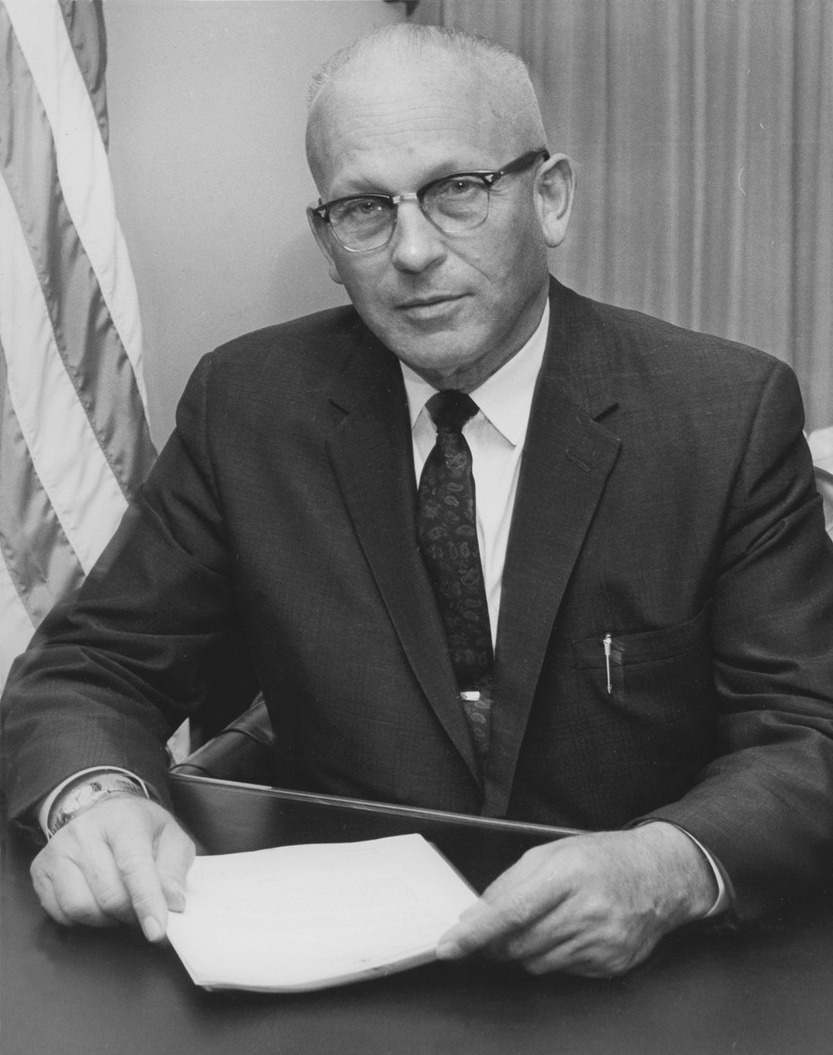

Assistant Secretary of Transportation for Urban Systems and Environment
- In office March 23, 1969 – 1970
- President: Richard Nixon

45th Mayor of Seattle
- In office April 6, 1964 – March 23, 1969
- Preceded by: Gordon S. Clinton
- Succeeded by: Floyd C. Miller

Member of the Seattle City Council
- In office 1954–1964

Personal details
- Born: James d'Orma Braman; December 23, 1901; Lorimor, Iowa, U.S.
- Died: August 21, 1980 (aged 78); Seattle, Washington, U.S.
- Political party: Republican

Military service
- Branch/service: United States Navy
- Unit: United States Navy Reserve

James d'Orma "Dorm" Braman (December 23, 1901 – August 21, 1980) was an American politician who served as the 45th mayor of Seattle, Washington from 1964 to 1969. To date, Braman was the last Republican to serve as Mayor of Seattle. Previously, mayors were elected for a term of four years, but because of a change in the date of election to odd-numbered years during his mayoral tenure, Braman served five and a half years.

== Early life and education ==
He was born in Lorimor, Iowa, on December 23, 1901. As a child, Braman lived in Oklahoma before his family relocated to Pend Oreille County, Washington around 1908. He attended Union High School from 1916 to 1918, dropping out to work in the family lumber business.

== Career ==
Braman worked in the lumber industry and also designed homes. In 1943, Braman served as a lieutenant in the United States Navy Reserve. Braman was based in Portland, Oregon and managed lumber procurement. In 1945, he was promoted to commander and transferred to Washington, D.C. He returned to the Puget Sound region in 1946.

He was elected to the Seattle City Council, serving from 1954 until he became mayor in 1964. He was appointed by President Richard Nixon as Assistant Secretary of Transportation for Urban Systems and Environment in February 1969, resigning as mayor on March 23, 1969, to accept the position. Braman resigned in 1970 and returned to Seattle after 18 months in the position.

== Death ==
Braman died in Seattle on August 21, 1980, at the age of 79.

Political offices
Preceded by Gordon S. Clinton	Mayor of Seattle; 1964–1969	Succeeded by Floyd C. Miller
