= Alex Deccio =

American politician from Washington

Member of the Washington Senate from the 14th district
- In office January 11, 1993 – January 1, 2007
- Preceded by: Jim Matson
- Succeeded by: James Clements

Member of the Washington Senate from the 14th district
- In office January 12, 1981 – January 9, 1989
- Preceded by: Jim Matson
- Succeeded by: Jim Matson

Member of the Washington House of Representatives from the 14th district
- In office January 10, 1977 – January 12, 1981
- Preceded by: Ed Seeberger
- Succeeded by: Noel Bickham

Member of the Washington House of Representatives from the 15th district
- In office January 13, 1975 – January 10, 1977
- Preceded by: Sid Morrison
- Succeeded by: Harold R. Clayton

Personal details
- Born: October 28, 1921 Walla Walla, Washington, U.S.
- Died: October 25, 2011 (aged 89) Yakima, Washington, U.S.
- Party: Republican
- Spouse: Lucille Deccio (1922-2017)
- Children: 8
- Occupation: Politician

Military service
- Allegiance: United States
- Branch/service: United States Army
- Unit: U.S. Army Air Forces
- Battles/wars: World War II

Alex A. Deccio (October 28, 1921 – October 25, 2011) was an American politician.

Born in Walla Walla, Washington, Deccio served in the United States Army Air Forces during World War II. He owned an insurance business in Yakima, Washington. Deccio served in the Washington House of Representatives 1975-1980 and then in the Washington State Senate. He also served as Yakima County, Washington commissioner.

== Awards ==
- 2002 Ted Robertson Community Service Award. Presented by Greater Yakima Chamber of Commerce.

== Personal life ==
On February 22, 1946, Deccio married Lucille Pauline Dexter (1922-2017). They have eight children. Deccio and his family live in Yakima, Washington.

On October 25, 2011, Deccio died in Yakima, Washington. He was 89 years old.
