= Master of Public Affairs =

Type of public policy degree

A Master of Public Affairs (MPA or MPAff) is a professional graduate degree that provides training in public policy and the operation of government. Courses required for this degree educate students in public and non-profit management, policy analysis, and applied technology. The degree is commonly applied to international and domestic policy careers. Many master of public affairs degrees are similar to a Master of Public Policy degree, whereas others fall closer to a Master of Public Administration degree. It is one of several public affairs degrees and has historically been a terminal degree.
