= Washington's 41st legislative district =

District of Washington State

Coordinates: 47°33′N 122°7′W

Map of Washington's 41st legislative district

Washington's 41st legislative district is one of forty-nine districts in Washington state for representation in the state legislature. It covers all of Mercer Island and Newcastle, with portions of Bellevue, Renton, Issaquah, and Sammamish.

The district's legislators are state senator Lisa Wellman and state representatives Janice Zahn (position 1) and My-Linh Thai (position 2), all Democrats.

== See also ==
- Washington Redistricting Commission
- Washington State Legislature
- Washington State Senate
- Washington House of Representatives
