= Tama Tokuda =

Japanese American performer and writer

- Born: Tamako Inouye; July 2, 1920; Seattle, United States
- Died: August 31, 2013 (aged 93)
- Spouse: George Tokuda
- Children: 5
- Relatives: Kip Tokuda (son); Wendy Tokuda (daughter); Marilyn Tokuda daughter); Maggie Tokuda-Hall (granddaughter)

Tama Tokuda (née Inouye; July 2, 1920 – August 31, 2013) was a Japanese American performer and writer. As a young adult, she was incarcerated at the Minidoka War Relocation Center in Idaho.

== Biography ==
Inouye was born in Seattle on July 2, 1920, to Kameki and Tokuji (née Toku) Inouye. As a child, she attended Japanese language and dance classes after school, and performed at the Nippon Kan Theatre.

After graduating from high school, she began attending the University of Washington to study literature, though she was unable to complete her degree before the beginning of World War II, during which she was incarcerated at the Minidoka War Relocation Center.

While there, Inouye worked at the camp's library, where she met George Tokuda, a romance which is discussed in her granddaughter's children's book, Love in the Library. The two later married and have five children, the first of whom was born at the internment camp and was developmentally disabled. Following the war, the couple ran Tokuda Drugs in Seattle.

George died in 1985, after which Tokuda began writing and performing again. During this time, she also became more active in the Asian American community, including working, volunteering, and performing with various organizations, including the Northwest Asian American Theatre and Wing Luke Asian Museum. She also began using "storytelling and theater to share deeply and powerfully about her incarceration experience."

Tokuda died August 31, 2013, from Alzheimer's disease.
