= Franklin High School (Seattle) =

Location
- 3013 South Mt. Baker Boulevard; Seattle, Washington 98144; United States; 47°34′34″N 122°17′34″W

Information
- School type: Public, Coeducational
- Motto: Truth, Unity, Honor
- Established: September 1912; 113 years ago
- School district: Seattle Public Schools
- NCES School ID: 530771001168
- Principal: Erik Weiss
- Staff: 62.10 FTEs
- Grades: 9–12
- Enrollment: 1,222 (2022–2023)
- Student to teacher ratio: 19.68
- Classrooms: 42
- Campus: Urban
- Campus size: 12.7 acres (5.1 ha)
- Colors: Forest Green & Black
- Athletics: 18 Varsity teams
- Athletics conference: Sea-King: Metro 3A
- Nickname: Quakers
- Newspaper: The Tolo
- Yearbook: The Tolo
- Budget: $7,440,714
- Communities served: Beacon Hill, Mount Baker, Columbia City
- Feeder schools: Washington Middle School; Mercer Middle School
- Website: franklinhs.seattleschools.org
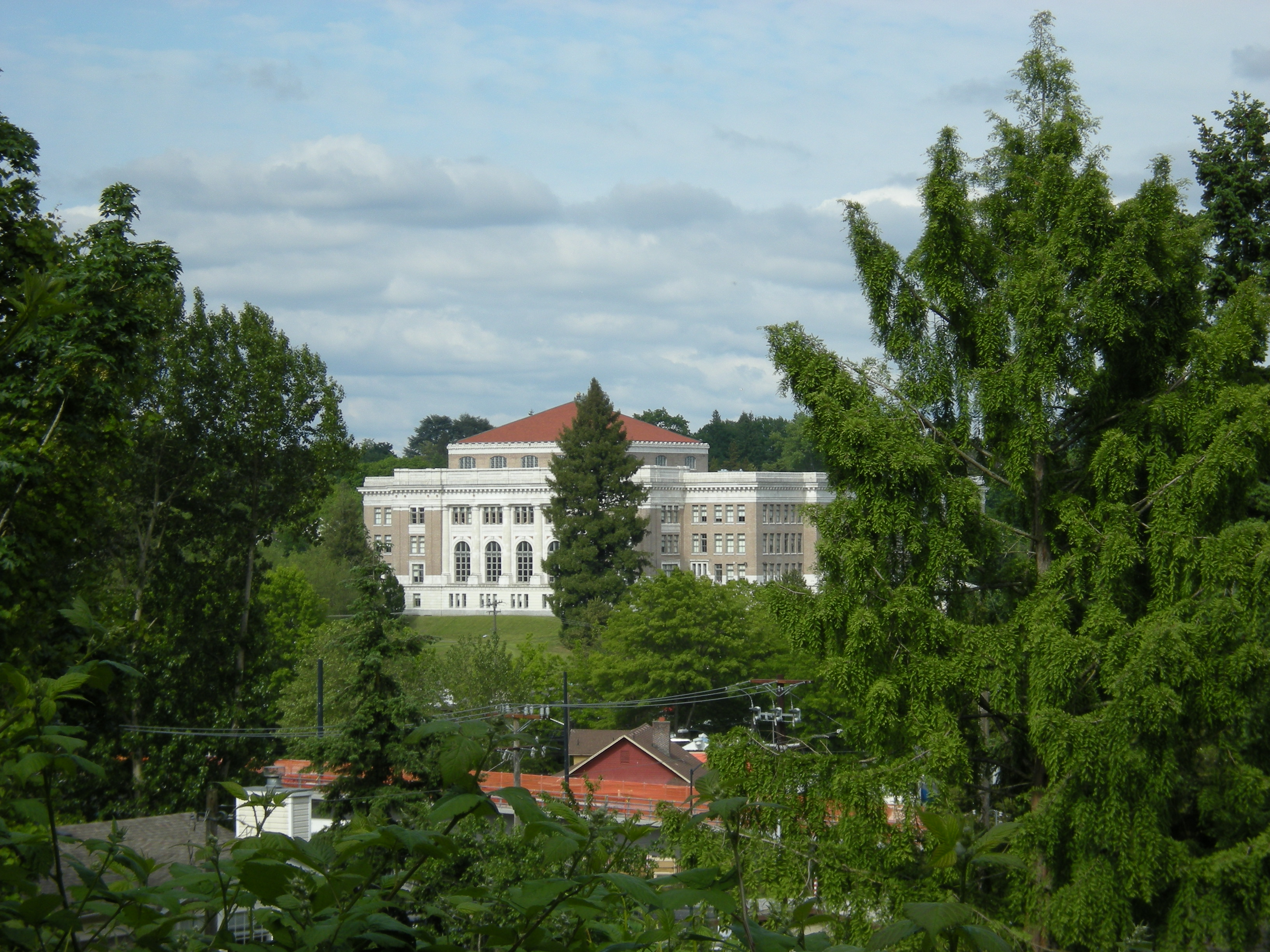
- FHS from Cheasty Boulevard South

Franklin High School is a public high school in Seattle, Washington, located in its Mount Baker neighborhood and administered by Seattle Public Schools.

As of the 2014–15 school year, the school had an enrollment of 1,315 students and 65.1 classroom teachers (on an FTE basis), for a student–teacher ratio of 20.2:1. There were 676 students (51.4% of enrollment) eligible for free lunch and 206 (15.7% of students) eligible for reduced-cost lunch.

== History and facilities ==
Franklin High School opened its doors 114 years ago in September 1912 and was Seattle's second purpose-built high school, after Seattle High School. Designed by architect Edgar Blair in a neo-Classical style, it was constructed of reinforced concrete and sited on 2.2 acres (0.9 ha). Expansions in 1925 by school district architect Floyd Naramore saw the site expanded to 10.6 acres (4.3 ha), in 1942 to 12.7 acres (5.1 ha), and in 1958 with a major addition by architect John W. Maloney that obscured the front facade of the building.

In 1986, the Seattle School Board voted to tear down the building, in part due to the cost of required seismic upgrades, which resulted in major protests by students, alumni, and the public. The Seattle's Landmarks Preservation Board designated the school as an official landmark which prevented its demolition.

As part of a major renovation by Bassetti Architects in 1988–90, the 1958 addition was demolished, the school was seismically upgraded and historically restored. New additions and renovations included a new student commons, classrooms and science labs, art studios, vocational tech labs, an auditorium and stage, and a media center. Awards for this renovation included the 2001 Washington Trust for Historic Preservation, Award of Merit; 1991 AIA Seattle, Award of Commendation; and 1991 Association of King County Historical Organization, Project Award.

The school is noted for its diversity, including having a plurality of Asian descent in its student body.

== Academies ==
Franklin High School's curriculum is divided into 5 academies, the 9th Grade Academy and four Small Learning Communities for the 10–12th Grade students: Academy of Finance (AOF), and John Stanford Public Service Academy (PSA), Humanities, and CREATE Academy. Each academy specializes in a particular study with their own mission statement and required classes.

=== Academy of Finance ===
The Academy of Finance is an integrated social studies and language arts program supported by the nationally recognized and represented National Academy Foundation. Students study world history and literature from the point of view of trade and economic development. By combining accounting, social studies, and language arts, the Academy of Finance develops skills needed in the business environment. Mastery of technology, knowledge of available resources, and good communication are prioritized.

=== John Stanford Public Service and Political Science Academy ===
The John Stanford Public Service and Political Science Academy (PSA), founded in 2000, is a college preparatory small learning community (SLC) that offers students a rigorous 3 year academic program that meets and exceeds state standards for Language Arts and Social Studies. State standards in LA and Social Studies are overlaid with an emphasis on the role of the public sector in societies, past and present. PSA students are challenged to develop their critical thinking skills and to develop their own vision of the role that they and their government should take in confronting the opportunities and problems of their local, national, and international communities. The PSA combines Public Service and Political Science (the study of law, government and NGOs, history, political systems, etc.).

=== Humanities ===
The Humanities is also a college preparatory academy. This academy is considered the best academy in Franklin High School's history. The classes consist of integrated Language Arts and Social Studies classes with special emphasis on project-based learning, the history of art and culture, and rigorous skills and content development. The Humanities program covers history through the lens of humanism starting in the Italian Renaissance and following through to modern times.

=== CREATE Academy ===
The CREATE Academy focuses on three subject: math, language arts, and woodshop. The approach is to relate these subjects to the different aspects of the building trades to prepare students for both university studies and work in the trades.

== National recognition ==
Franklin won the National High School Mock Trial Championship in 2000 and again in 2018. It is one of only five schools in the country to have won the championship twice, and the only school to do so with more than a year between victories.

== Notable alumni ==
=== Athletics ===
- Mario Bailey – University of Washington wide receiver, selected in 1992 NFL draft by the Houston Oilers
- Bruno Boin – UW basketball player
- Aaron Brooks – NBA point guard, New York Knicks
- Jesse Chatman – NFL running back 2002–08
- Corey Dillon – NFL running back, Cincinnati Bengals and New England Patriots; 1997 NFL draft, played one season at UW in 1996.
- Fritz Greenlee – NFL linebacker
- James Hasty – NFL cornerback; New York Jets, Kansas City Chiefs, and Oakland Raiders; 1988 to 2001
- John Hoffman – former MLB player (Houston Astros)
- Bill Hutchinson – captain of UW baseball team; surgeon who founded Fred Hutchinson Cancer Research Center; class of 1927
- Fred Hutchinson – MLB pitcher and manager, namesake of Fred Hutchinson Cancer Research Center; class of 1937
- Bruce Jarvis – UW and NFL center; 1971 NFL draft, Buffalo Bills
- Trent Johnson – head coach of TCU Horned Frogs men's basketball team, formerly with LSU, Stanford, and Nevada
- Terry Metcalf – NFL running back, 1973 NFL draft, St. Louis Cardinals
- Rick Noji – UW track and field star, six-time All-American
- Aaron Pierce – UW and NFL tight end; 1992 NFL draft, New York Giants
- Ryan Phillips – CFL defensive back, BC Lions
- Ron Santo – MLB third baseman, Chicago Cubs; five Gold Gloves; an all-time top ten athlete from Seattle named by Sports Illustrated; broadcaster; diagnosed with diabetes at age 20; voted into Baseball Hall of Fame in 2012
- Peyton Siva – professional basketball player for Alba Berlin; former NBA point guard, Detroit Pistons
- Alvin Snow – professional basketball player; first All-American basketball player at Eastern Washington University in Cheney
- Dewey Soriano – owner of Seattle Pilots in their only Major League Baseball season
- Brice Taylor – first All-American football player at USC in 1925; born without a left hand and orphaned at age 5
- Jason Terry – former professional basketball player, 2011 champion, and assistant coach for the Utah Jazz
- Kenji Yamada – two-time U.S. National Judo champion
- Tony Zackery – NFL cornerback, University of Washington

=== Performing arts ===
- Kenny G – Jazz musician, 25th-highest selling artist in America by the RIAA (as of 2003) and the 1994 recipient of a Grammy Award for Best Instrumental Composition for "Forever in Love". He jokes that it was in Franklin that he had his first sax solo and his first kiss and it is hard to decide which was more important.
- Ari Glass – Painter
- Amy Hill – Actress
- John Keister – Comedian, writer, commentator and motivational speaker
- Michael Leavitt (artist) – visual artist, sculptor and toy designer.
- Dave Lewis – Key figure in the creation of the Northwest sound in the rock'n'roll years; popularized Louie Louie and played a key role in desegregating the Seattle music scene.
- Keye Luke – Actor known for playing Lee Chan in the Charlie Chan films, the original Kato in the 1939–1941 The Green Hornet film serials, and Master Po in the television series Kung Fu.
- Mark Morris – Modern American dancer, choreographer and director, founder of the Mark Morris Dance Group; Director of Dance at Théâtre Royal de la Monnaie, Belgium's national opera house; co-founder of the White Oak Dance Project. A Fellow of the MacArthur Foundation (1991), 2010 recipient of the Leonard Bernstein Lifetime Achievement Award for the Elevation of Music in Society, recipient of eleven honorary doctorates.
- Marilyn Tokuda, actress, dancer and arts administrator, starred in Xanadu and founded the improvisation group Cold Tofu.

=== Others ===
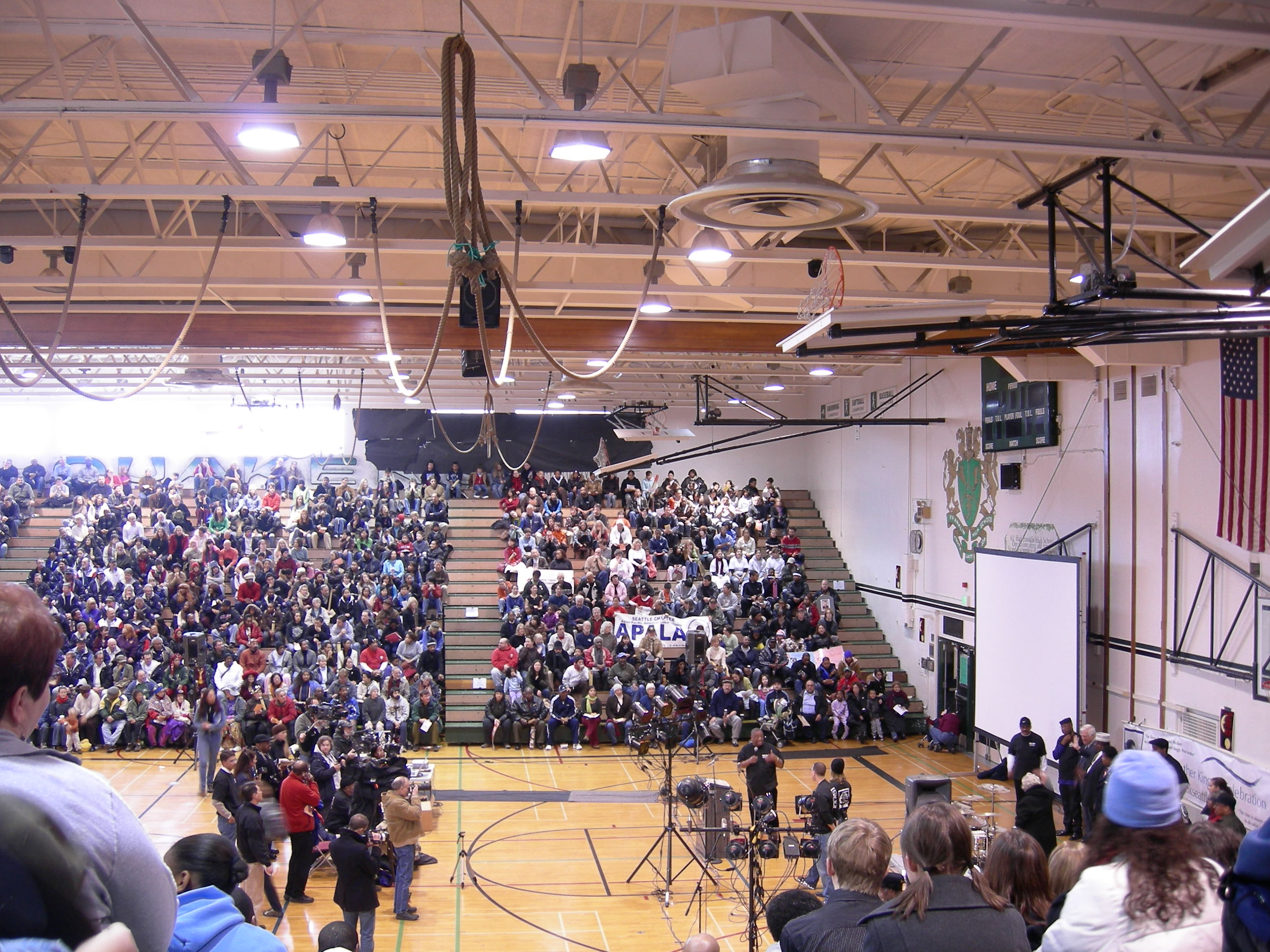
Larry Gossett addressing a Martin Luther King, Jr. Day rally at the Franklin High School gymnasium (2006).

- Lewis Albanese – Medal of Honor recipient during the Vietnam War.
- Lynda Barry – Cartoonist and author.
- Royal Brougham – Journalist, news editor, and philanthropist. As an editor for the student paper in 1920, he suggested the school's teams be named "Quakers".
- Horace R. Cayton, Jr. (1903–1970) – Sociologist.
- Ron Chew – Community organizer and historian.
- Larry Gossett – Politician. He was arrested for unlawful assembly during a March 29, 1968 sit-in at Franklin High School.
- George H. Hitchings – American chemist. He shared the 1988 Nobel Prize in Physiology or Medicine for discovering important principles in drug treatment leading to new drugs to treat diseases which include leukemia, malaria, herpes virus infections, and gout.
- Ed Lee – Mayor of San Francisco.
- Gary Locke – Chinese-American politician. 10th U.S. Ambassador to China (2011–2014), U.S. Secretary of Commerce (2009–2011), Governor of Washington (1997–2005), King County Executive (1994–1997), Washington House of Representatives (1983–1994).
- Alfred M. Moen – founder of Moen Incorporated and inventor of the single-handed mixing faucet.
- Everett Nordstrom – chairman and CEO of Nordstrom.
- Scott Oki – Former senior vice-president of sales and marketing for Microsoft, founder of the non-profit Oki Foundation.
- W. H. Pugmire – author of Lovecraftian horror and weird fiction.
- Noah Purcell, attorney and as Solicitor General of Washington since 2013
- Franklin Raines – Associate director for economics and government in the Office of Management and Budget and assistant director of the White House Domestic Policy Staff from 1977 to 1979, a partner at Lazard Freres and Co., former Vice Chairman and former CEO of Fannie Mae, Director of the U.S. Office of Management and Budget in the Clinton Administration.
- Ralph Julian Rivers – the first congressman from Alaska.
- James Sakamoto (1903–1955), journalist and community organizer.
- Roy Schwitters (1944–2023), physicist, Professor at Harvard, Physics department chair at University of Texas, Fellow of American Physical Society, director of the Superconducting Super Collider, Panofsky Prize winner.
- Bell M. Shimada (1922–1958, class of 1939), fisheries scientist who pioneered the study of the tuna fishery in the tropical Pacific Ocean.
- Mark Sidran (born 1951, class of 1969), former Seattle City Attorney
- Victor Steinbrueck (1911–1985), architect who contributed to the design of the Space Needle and fought to preserve significant historical landmarks of Seattle, including the Pike Place Market; November 2 is Steinbrueck Day in Seattle.
- Emmett Watson (1918–2001, class of 1937), Seattle newspaper columnist
- Girmay Zahilay, politician, King County Executive

== See also ==
- List of Seattle landmarks
