= Kip Tokuda =

American social worker and politician from Washington

Member of the Washington House of Representatives from the 37th district
- In office January 9, 1995 – January 13, 2003 Serving with Dawn Mason
- Preceded by: Vivian Caver
- Succeeded by: Eric Pettigrew

Personal details
- Born: October 8, 1946 Seattle, Washington, U.S.
- Died: July 13, 2013 (aged 66) Whidbey Island, Washington, U.S.
- Relatives: Tama Tokuda (mother); Wendy Tokuda (sister); Marilyn Tokuda (sister); Maggie Tokuda-Hall (niece)
- Education: University of Washington (BA, MSW)
- Occupation: social worker, politician

Kip Yoshino Tokuda (October 8, 1946 – July 13, 2013) was an American social worker and politician.

== Background ==
Tokuda was born in 1946 in Seattle, Washington. His parents George and Tamako (born Inouye) owned the Tokuda Pharmacy, which was located on Jackson Street at the time. He was raised in Seattle's Central District and on Beacon Hill neighborhoods. He initially attended Garfield High School, but transferred and graduated from Cleveland High School. Tokuda received both his bachelor's and master's degree from the University of Washington (1969, B.A. in sociology, master's degree in social work in 1973). He was director of children's and human services programs.

He served in the Washington House of Representatives 1995-2003 as a Democrat. Tokuda was chairman of the House Children and Family Services Committee of the state House. He was also a member of the Appropriations Committee and the Juvenile Justice and Family Law Committee in the chamber.

Tokuda founded the Japanese Cultural and Community Center of Washington. On April 29, 2012, Tokuda was awarded the Order of the Rising Sun, Gold Rays with Rosette by Emperor Akihito for promoting positive relations between Japan and the United States.

His sister is television journalist Wendy Tokuda. His niece Maggie Tokuda-Hall wrote a children's book called Love in the Library about how his parents met while imprisoned inside a Japanese-American detention camp during the Second World War.

== Death ==
Tokuda died of a heart attack on July 13, 2013, at age 66 while fishing on Whidbey Island.

== Legacy ==
In 2016, the Kip Tokuda Memorial Civil Liberties Public Education Program was established in the State of Washington through the Office of Superintendent of Public Instruction to educate the public regarding the history and the lessons of the World War II exclusion, removal, and detention of persons of Japanese ancestry.

== See also ==
- History of the Japanese in Seattle
