= Vivian Caver =

American politician (1928–2021)

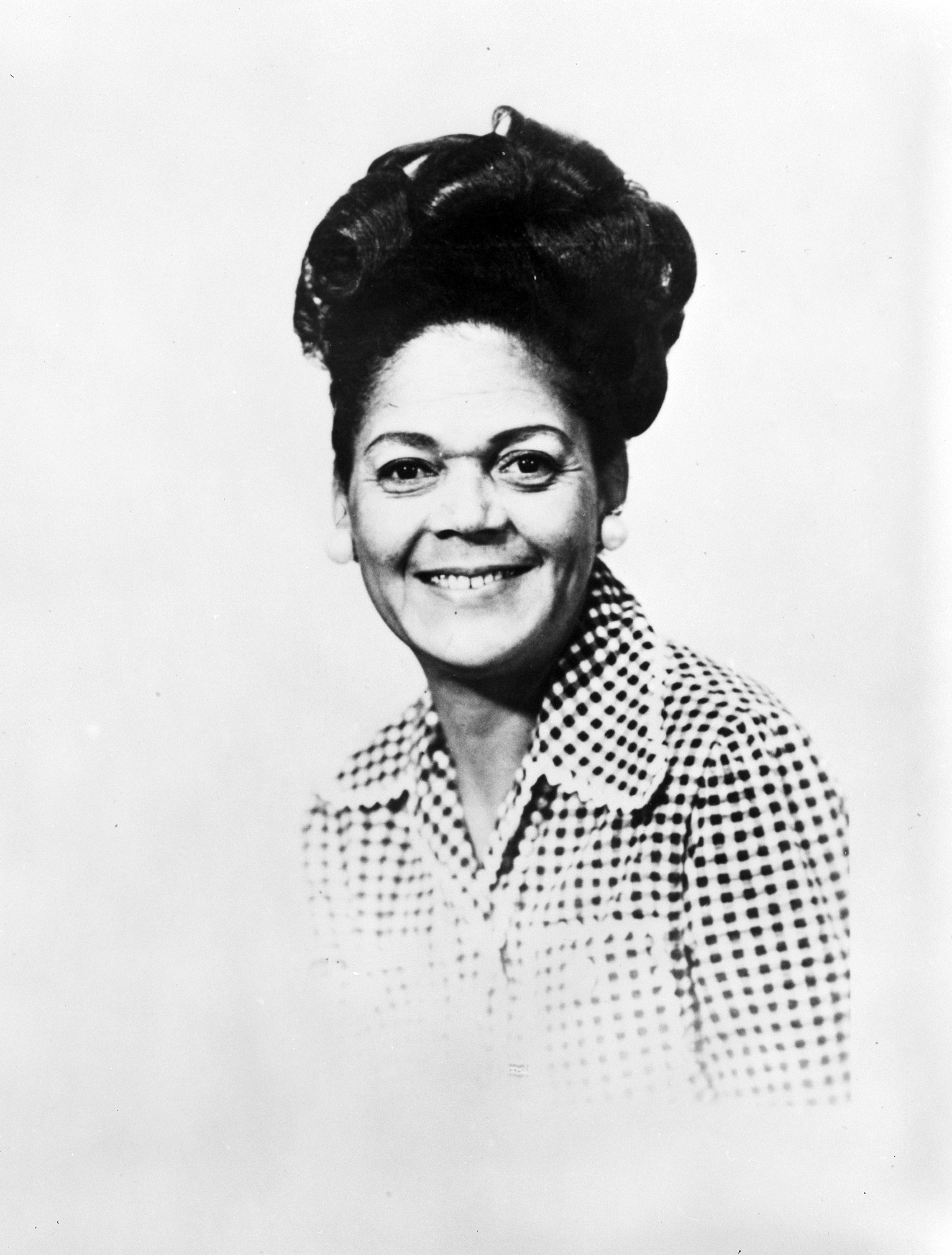

Member of the Washington House of Representatives for the 37th district
- In office January 10, 1994 – January 9, 1995
- Preceded by: Gary Locke
- Succeeded by: Kip Tokuda

Personal details
- Born: June 13, 1928 Jackson, Tennessee, United States
- Died: August 22, 2021 (aged 93) Seattle, Washington
- Party: Democratic
- Spouse: Monroe Starkey Caver
- Education: University of Washington
- Occupation: human rights activist

Vivian Leona Mead Caver (June 13, 1928 – August 22, 2021) was an American politician in the state of Washington. Appointed to a 37th District vacancy, Caver was the third African-American woman to serve in the Washington House of Representatives, serving the 37th district from 1994 to 1995. An alumnus of Morgan State College and the University of Washington, she was a human rights activist.

She directed the Seattle Human Rights Commission before her appointment to the Washington State House of Representatives.

She died on August 22, 2021, in Seattle, Washington, at age 93.
