= Maggie Tokuda-Hall =

American author of children's and young adult novels

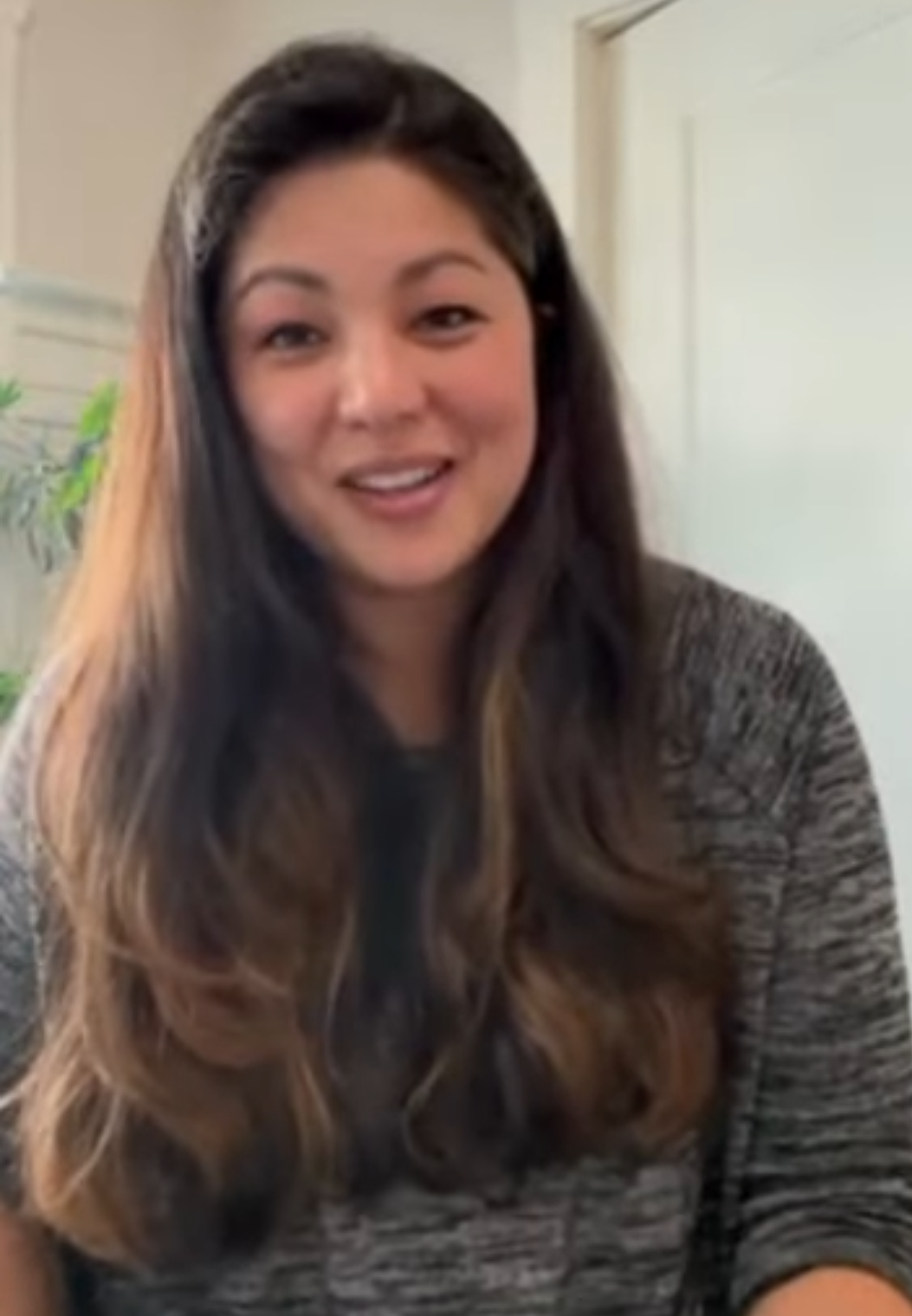
- In a San Francisco Public Library video in 2023
- Born: 1984 (age 41–42)
- Education: Piedmont High School; Scripps College (BA); University of San Francisco (MFA)
- Occupation: Author
- Relatives: Wendy Tokuda (mother); Monty Hall (grandfather); Marilyn Hall (grandmother); Joanna Gleason (aunt); Kip Tokuda (uncle); Marilyn Tokuda (aunt)
- Writing career
- Genres: Children's and young adult books
- Website: prettyokmaggie.com

Maggie Tokuda-Hall (born 1984) is an American author of children's picture books and young adult novels and graphic novels. She is a co-founder of Authors Against Book Bans and served as its first president from 2024 to 2026.

== Personal life and education ==
Tokuda-Hall was born in 1984 to American television journalist Wendy Tokuda and television producer Richard Hall, who is the son of game show host Monty Hall and television producer Marilyn Hall. Actress Joanna Gleason is her paternal aunt. She was raised in her father's Jewish faith. Washington State Representative Kip Tokuda was her maternal uncle.

She graduated from Piedmont High School, then received a Bachelor of Arts in studio art from Scripps College and a Master of Fine Arts in creative writing from the University of San Francisco. As of May 2023, she lived in Oakland, California with her husband and son.

Tokuda-Hall is bisexual. She is anti-death penalty and believes in "abolishing the police and the carceral state," separating the "revenge fantas[y]" of Squad from her personal beliefs.

== Works ==
=== Also an Octopus (2016) ===
Also an Octopus, illustrated by Benji Davies and published October 4, 2016, by Candlewick Press, walks young readers through the process of writing a story.

Reviewing the book, Publishers Weekly wrote, "Tokuda-Hall offers a capricious crash course in the elements and boundless possibilities of story," noting "Tokuda-Hall subtly introduces concepts like conflict and emotional stakes as the octopus unsuccessfully attempts to build a spaceship." They further highlighted how "Davies’s [...] freewheeling digital art keeps pace with the encouraging narration, and the concluding image—of a rocket scientist water-skiing atop a rhino while wearing a colander on her head—cements the idea that, when it comes to storytelling, anything is possible."

School Library Journal's Julie Roach wrote, "The bubbly, appealing art has punchy humor and works as an ongoing conversation with the narration, bringing the fumbling but exciting progress of crafting a new story to life."

Booklist also reviewed Also an Octopus.

In 2017, Bank Street College of Education included Also an Octopus on their list of the year's best children's books.

=== The Mermaid, the Witch, and the Sea (2020) ===
The Mermaid, the Witch, and the Sea, published May 5, 2020, by Candlewick Press, follows Flora (a girl), who becomes Florian (a man) aboard the pirate ship Dove. Before boarding Dove, Flora was an orphan but takes on the identity of Florian to earn the crew's respect and protection. Unbeknownst to Flora (and the passengers), the passengers will be sold into slavery. During the voyage, she is mentored by a passenger, Evelyn, who is on her way into an arranged marriage. Together, the two plan to escape the ship and free a mermaid with the support of a witch and the sea itself.

In a starred review, Shelf Awareness's Lynn Becker highlighted how Tokuda-Hall "crafted a brooding, magical adventure with a healthy dose of intrigue," stating, "Her prose is delightful, by turns delicate and brutal, as her plot demands. At the heart of this tale about learning when to stand out and when to blend in, lies the importance, imparted by first mate Rake, of 'know[ing] your truth, not your story.'"

Publishers Weekly highlighted how "Tokuda-Hall aptly explores themes of gender identity and misogyny while illustrating colonialism’s horrors" and further discussed how the book provides "a global viewpoint that ripples through the story without disrupting the narrative."

The Mermaid, the Witch, and the Sea also received reviews from Booklist and School Library Journal. Booklist also reviewed the audiobook.

=== Squad (2021) ===
Squad, illustrated by Lisa Sterle and published October 5, 2021, by Greenwillow Books, is a graphic novel that tells the story of three popular high school girls who befriend fellow student Becca. As the story unfolds, the reader learns that the girls are werewolves. Every full moon, "choose one sexually aggressive male as their victim—attacking at the moment when a party hookup turns nonconsensual"; they need Becca "to help them fully devour their prey."

==== Background ====
Tokuda-Hall came up with the idea for Squad while on a road trip with her husband. As she wrote the book, she kept in mind the #MeToo movement, including named predators and how the movement "ended up being co-opted by white women." To represent this, Tokuda-Hall crafted the character of Arianna, who is white and the pack's leader, to be "perfectly comfortable doing things like weaponizing her tears, belittling the women of color that she surrounds herself with, [and] using her own power to keep them down to her own detriment."

==== Reviews ====
Booklist wrote, "Female friendship sits front and center in this supernatural vigilante story, even when plans unravel. Readers who want thrilling carnage, sharp dialogue, and sapphic romance mixed into their teen dramas will devour this transformative tale."

Kirkus Reviews called the book "an exciting look at girl power gone wrong."

Shelf Awareness's Alanna Felton called Squad " incisive" and "darkly humorous," noting it "is an unabashedly feminist story, exploring female hunger and desire--for status, belonging and power--while criticizing rape culture" and "clearly convey[ing] the intensity of female friendships and their potential for toxicity." Regarding the artwork, Felton wrote, "Sterle's art is both stylish and sinister, effortlessly shifting between panels of humorous character interactions and gruesome gore."

Tor.com's Alex Brown highlighted how "this is not a story about good girls gone bad. There is no redemption arc or hero’s journey. Squad is populated by morally gray characters who make choices – good, bad, and otherwise – that they’ll have to live with for what’s left of the rest of their lives." Brown also noted that "Lisa Sterle is the perfect artist to bring Maggie Tokuda-Hall’s story to life. Her style is realistic but with a slightly cartoon-y bent. The panels tend to have solid background colors instead of dense details, which allows Sterle to punch up the emotion based on which colors she chooses."

School Library Journal also reviewed the book.

=== Love in the Library (2022) ===
Love in the Library, illustrated by Yas Imamura and published February 8, 2022, by Candlewick Press, is a children's picture book. The book takes places in Minidoka, a War Relocation Center for Japanese Americans during World War II, and follows Tama, who enjoys working in the camp's library. There, she meets George, a patron who arrives at the library every morning with arms full of borrowed books. As time passes and they develop a strong friendship, Tama wonders whether George comes to the library for the books or for her. The book is based on the true story of how Tokuda-Hall's grandparents met, which she discusses in an afterword with a photo of her grandparents.

Love in the Library was well received by critics, including starred reviews from Booklist, Publishers Weekly, and School Library Journal. In 2022, School Library Journal, Booklist, and Publishers Weekly included the book on their lists of the year's best picture books. Booklist also included it on their "Top 10 Historical Fiction for Youth" list, and it was a 2023 Association for Library Service to Children Notable Children's Book.

In April 2023, Scholastic's Education division proposed obtaining the rights to publish the picture book for inclusion in a collection called Amplifying AANHPI (Asian Americans and Native Hawaiians/Pacific Islanders). The collection is part of the Rising Voices Library, which curates books along with teaching materials for educators, aiming to offer students engaging texts that highlight the narratives of historically marginalized groups. To be included in the library, Scholastic requested Tokuda-Hall remove the phrase "virulent racism" from a sentence in the Author's Note discussing the traumatic impact of anti-Japanese American policies and to delete a paragraph addressing the broader historical repercussions of racism in America. Tokuda-Hall declined the opportunity to be included in the Rising Voices Library, refusing to alter her book and its message. Scholastic later apologized and requested a meeting with Tokuda-Hall to discuss including her book in the library. Although Tokuda-Hall initially denied requests for a meeting, she met with Scholastic CEO Peter Warwick in May 2023 to discuss the matter; however, they did not meet Tokuda-Hall's requests, as she states in her blog, "The Answer Is Still No".

Beyond the response from Scholastic, Tokuda-Hall has stated she received many hate messages regarding the book, as well as emails against the promotion of diversity, equity, and inclusion initiatives.

== Awards and honors ==
Tokuda-Hall's books have regularly landed on lists of the year's best books:

- In 2017, Bank Street College of Education included Tokuda-Hall's debut children's book, Also an Octopus, on their list of the year's best children's books.
- In 2020, Tokuda-Hall's debut novel, The Mermaid, the Witch, and the Sea, was named one of the year's best young adult novels by NPR, Kirkus Reviews, Locus, School Library Journal, and Tor.com.
- In 2021, Locus, the San Francisco Chronicle, and Tor.com included Squad on their lists of the year's best books for young adults. Autostraddle included it on their list of the year's best queer books.
- In 2022, School Library Journal, Booklist, and Publishers Weekly included Love in the Library on their lists of the year's best picture books. Booklist also included it on their "Top 10 Historical Fiction for Youth" list, and it was a 2023 Association for Library Service to Children Notable Children's Book.

Awards for Tokuda-Hall's writing
Year	Title	Award	Result	Ref.
2020	The Mermaid, the Witch, and the Sea	Otherwise Award	Honor	
2021		Kids' Book Choice Award for Best Book Creator Digital Presence	Finalist	
2021	Squad	Golden Poppy Award for Young Adult	Winner	
2021	Squad	Goodreads Choice Award for Best Graphic Novels & Comics	Nominee	
2021	The Mermaid, the Witch, and the Sea	Locus Award for Best First Novel	Finalist	
2022	Squad	Ignyte Award for Best Comics Team	Finalist	
2022	Squad	Locus Award for Best Illustrated and Art Book	Top 10	

== Publications ==
=== Picture books ===
- Also an Octopus, illustrated by Benji Davies (Candlewick Press, 2016)
- Love in the Library, illustrated by Yas Imamura (Candlewick Press, 2022)
- What Do People Do at the Science Museum? illustrated by Qin Leng (Chronicle Books, 2026)
- Bathtime for Snow Monkeys, illustrated by Yas Imamura (Candlewick Press, 2026)

=== Graphic novels ===
- Squad, illustrated by Lisa Sterle (Greenwillow Books, 2021)
- The Worst Ronin, illustrated by Faith Schaffer (HarperCollins, 2024)

=== The Mermaid, the Witch, and the Sea series ===
- The Mermaid, the Witch, and the Sea (Candlewick Press, 2020)
- The Siren, the Song, and the Spy (Candlewick Press, 2023)

=== Anthology contributions ===
- "Little Pink Feet" in Body Language: Writers on Identity, Physicality, and Making Space for Ourselves, edited by Nicole Chung and Matt Ortile
- "Shark Week" in Mermaids Never Drown: Tales to Dive For, edited by Zoraida Córdova and Natalie C. Parker (Feiwel and Friends, 2023)
- "The Cherry Blossom Queen" in Everything Under the Moon, edited by Michael Earp (Simon & Schuster, 2026)
- "Beneath a Yellow Moon" in These Kindred Hearts, edited by Shari B. Pennant (Penguin Random House, 2026)
