= Marilyn Hall =

Canadian-American television producer and philanthropist (1927–2017)

- Born: Marilyn Doreen Plottel; May 17, 1927; Winnipeg, Manitoba, Canada
- Died: June 5, 2017 (aged 90); Beverly Hills California, U.S.
- Resting place: Hillside Memorial Park Cemetery
- Education: University of Toronto; UCLA School of Theater, Film and Television (MFA)
- Occupations: Television producer, philanthropist
- Spouse: Monty Hall (m. 1947)
- Children: 3, including Joanna Gleason
- Relatives: Maggie Tokuda-Hall (granddaughter)

Marilyn Doreen Hall (née Plottel; May 17, 1927 – June 5, 2017) was a Canadian-American television and theatre producer, as well as a television writer. She also wrote songs, a cookbook and book reviews. She supported many charities, including Jewish causes in the United States and Israel.

== Early life ==
Marilyn Doreen Plottel was born on May 17, 1927, in Winnipeg, Manitoba. She graduated from the University of Toronto, where she earned a bachelor's degree. She later earned a Master of Fine Arts degree from the UCLA School of Theater, Film and Television.

== Career ==
Hall began her career in radio for the Canadian Broadcasting Corporation. She subsequently became a songwriter; her song "Is It Possible That I've Been Gone So Long" was recorded by Hildegarde. She was a television writer for Love, American Style and Lights, Camera, Monty! She was an associate producer of Jelly's Last Jam and Angels in America: A Gay Fantasia on National Themes. On television, she produced the PBS adaption of The Ginger Tree as well as the 1984 film Nadia. She produced A Woman Called Golda and Do You Remember Love?, both of which won Emmy Awards. She also produced documentary films for Tel Aviv University in Israel. She was also a book reviewer for the Los Angeles Times. She co-authored a cookbook, The Celebrity Kosher Cookbook, with rabbi Jerome Cutler in 1975.

== Philanthropy ==
Hall served on the board of trustees of Variety Clubs International, and she produced their International Humanitarian Award event. She made charitable contributions to the Julia Ann Singer Child Care Center, Guardians of Courage, and the Wallis Annenberg Center for the Performing Arts in Beverly Hills, California. She also supported Jewish causes like the Jewish Welfare Fund, the Jewish Home for the Aging and Brandeis University in the United States, as well as the Israel Bonds and Tel Aviv University in Israel.

== Personal life and death ==
Hall married Monty Hall in 1947. She died on June 5, 2017. Their children are Joanna Gleason, a Tony Award-winning actress; Sharon Hall, an executive at Marcus/Glass Entertainments; and Richard Hall, the Emmy Award-winning producer of The Amazing Race. Marilyn Hall predeceased her husband by three and a half months.

== Works ==
- Cutler, Jerome; Hall, Marilyn (1975). The Celebrity Kosher Cookbook: A Sentimental Journey with Food, Mothers, and Memories. Los Angeles, California: J.P. Tarcher. ISBN 9780874770421. OCLC 1945284.
