= Kirsten Harris-Talley =

American politician from Washington

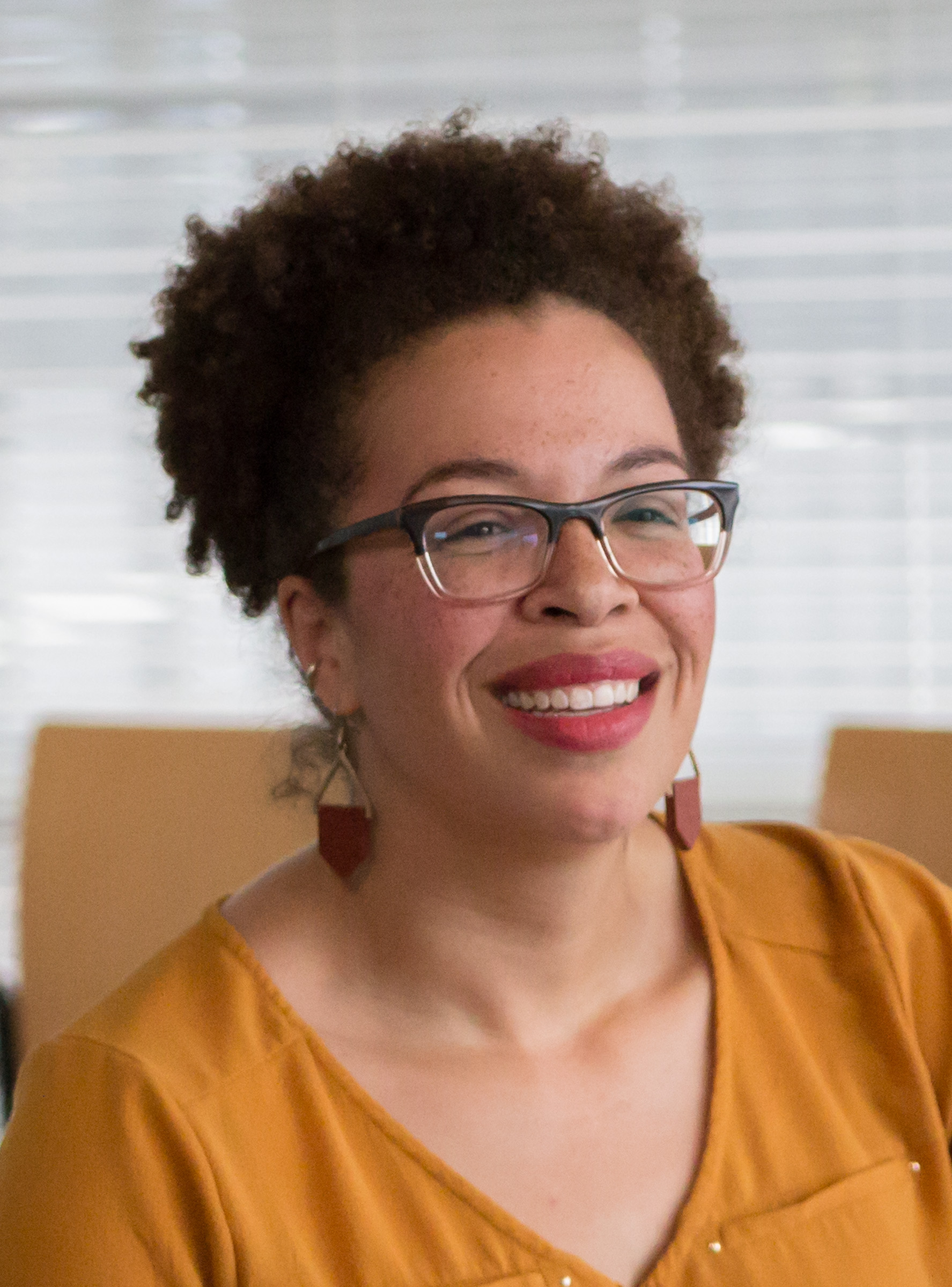

Member of the Washington House of Representatives from the 37th district
- In office January 11, 2021 – January 9, 2023 Serving with Sharon Tomiko Santos
- Preceded by: Eric Pettigrew
- Succeeded by: Chipalo Street

Member of the Seattle City Council, At-large Position 8
- In office October 6, 2017 – November 28, 2017
- Preceded by: Tim Burgess
- Succeeded by: Teresa Mosqueda

Personal details
- Born: 1979 (age 46–47) Chilhowee, Missouri, U.S.
- Party: Democratic
- Children: 2
- Education: School of the Art Institute of Chicago (AA); University of Washington (BA)

Kirsten Harris-Talley (born 1979) is an American politician who served as a member of the Washington House of Representatives from the 37th legislative district.

== Early life and education ==
Harris-Talley was born in Chilhowee, Missouri and later moved to Warrensburg, Missouri after her parents divorced. She earned an associate degree in fine and studio arts from the School of the Art Institute of Chicago and a Bachelor of Arts degree in social sciences, law, and economics from the University of Washington in Seattle.

From 2001 to 2012, Harris-Talley was the program manager of Cardea Services, a Seattle-based non-profit.

== Seattle City Council ==
She served for 51 days as a member of the Seattle City Council in 2017, following the appointment of Tim Burgess as mayor. She was appointed on October 6, 2017, and was succeeded by Teresa Mosqueda following the certification of election results on November 28. While in office, she co-sponsored and later voted for one of the first versions of the Seattle head tax, a bill that was rejected by the full council.

After leaving the city council, Harris-Talley was appointed to the Progressive Revenue Task Force, which was tasked with creating a new progressive tax similar to the Head Tax that she voted for. Later, she became the executive director of NARAL Pro-Choice Washington.

== Washington State Representative ==
=== 2020 Election ===
In February 2020, Harris-Talley announced that she would be running for Washington House of Representatives 37th district position 2, after Eric Pettigrew announced he would not seek reelection. She would run a progressive social justice oriented campaign, advocating for universal healthcare and childcare, green infrastructure, and auditing the Washington State Department of Corrections.

In the August 2020 primary election, Harris-Talley led with 51.18% of the vote, with Chukundi Salisbury coming in second with 23.07%.

In the general election, Harris-Talley won in a landslide against Salisbury, 65.52% to 33.17%.

=== Tenure ===
She was the first out, Black, queer femme to serve in the Washington State Legislature.

While in office, she sponsored and helped pass legislation focused on police reform and reproductive access with doulas.

In 2022, Harris-Talley announced she would not seek reelection, citing a toxic work place in the legislature and the process surrounding the vote on HB 2037, which would modify the standard for use of force by police officers.

== Activism ==
In 2016, Harris-Talley worked with No New Youth Jail, a youth-led abolitionist movement, and on a campaign to “Block the Bunker”, opposing the proposed North Seattle Police Precinct.

== Personal life ==
Harris-Talley identifies as queer. She and her husband, Jason, have two children.
