= Eric Pettigrew =

American politician from Washington

Member of the Washington House of Representatives from the 37th district
- In office January 13, 2003 – January 11, 2021
- Preceded by: Kip Tokuda
- Succeeded by: Kirsten Harris-Talley

Personal details
- Born: 1960 (age 65–66) Los Angeles, California
- Party: Democratic
- Spouse: Nicole
- Education: Oregon State University, University of Washington
- Occupation: professional sports executive

Eric Pettigrew (born 1960) was a Democratic member of the Washington House of Representatives, representing the 37th district from 2003 to 2021. Pettigrew is African-American. He succeeded Kip Tokuda.

== Awards ==
Pettigrew was the recipient of a 2009 Fuse "Sizzle" Award, "for courageous and principled leadership based on the progressive values that make our country great." He was given the Sizzle True Patriot Award for working to identify new revenue options to balance nearly $9 billion in cuts to the Washington State 2009-2011 biennial budget.
