= Marilyn Tokuda =

American actress, dancer, arts administrator and advocate

- Born: January 7, 1953 (age 73); Seattle, Washington, United States
- Occupations: Actress; dancer; arts administrator; advocate
- Years active: 1975—present

Marilyn Tokuda (born January 7, 1953) is an American actress, dancer, arts administrator, and advocate, known for her significant contributions to Asian American representation in the arts and media.

== Early life and family background ==
Marilyn Tokuda was born in 1953 in Seattle, Washington, the youngest of five children of George and Tamako (née Inouye), owners of the Tokuda Pharmacy, on Jackson Street. Along with her siblings, she was raised in Seattle's Central District and later in the Beacon Hill neighborhood. Her mother, Tame Tokuda, was born in 1920 in Seattle and was actively involved in the arts from a young age. Tame's early life was marked by her incarceration at the Minidoka War Relocation Center during World War II, where she met and married George Tokuda. Tokuda's oldest brother, Floyd, was born at the camp and was developmentally disabled.

Another of Tokuda's older brothers, Kip Tokuda, was a social worker and politician who served as a member of the Washington House of Representatives from the 37th district from 1995 to 2003. He was a prominent figure in public service until his death in 2013. Tokuda's sister, Wendy Tokuda, is a well-known American television journalist.

Tokuda attended Franklin High School. At an early age, through her mother's cultural activities, she became aware of East West Players ("EWP"), the first Asian American theater company in Los Angeles. While attending the University of Washington, Tokuda's dedication to Asian American theater deepened, leading her to seek mentorship from Mako, a co-founder of EWP.

== Acting career ==
Having received her BA in drama from the University of Washington, Tokuda moved to Los Angeles in 1975 and began studies with the East West Players. Her early professional career was largely as a singer-dancer in nightclub revues alongside entertainers such as Connie Stevens and Mac Davis. She landed her first television appearance in 1978 in The Roller Girls as Shana 'Pipeline' Akira for four episodes. She went on to establish herself in both television and film, with a range of small roles in series such as Hill Street Blues, T J Hooker, Magnum, P.I. and Airwolf.

An early highlight of her film career was her role in the 1980 musical fantasy film Xanadu. In this cult classic, Tokuda played one of the immortal Muses from Greek myth. She was the eighth muse to emerge from the mural during the films opening "I'm Alive" sequence, and later appeared in the closing musical finale, alongside Olivia Newton-John and Gene Kelly.

Throughout the 1980s and 1990s, Tokuda continued to build a diverse filmography. She appeared in comedies like All Night Long (1981) alongside Gene Hackman, My Tutor (1983) as an aerobics instructor, and All of Me (1984) starring Steve Martin. In 1989, she had a series of notable roles in films such as The Jitters, Farewell to the King alongside Nick Nolte and the action film Cage with Lou Ferrigno.

In the 1990s Tokuda's television appearances include guest roles on popular series like Frasier (1993) as Cecilia, Friends (1994) and JAG (1995) as Dr. Oh. In 1997, she played Donna Wing in Alien Nation: The Udara Legacy.

In the 2000s and beyond, Tokuda continued to take on a variety of roles. Notably, she appeared in five episodes of Grey's Anatomy, portraying Grandma Peg. Her voice work includes characters in the animated film Alpha and Omega (2010). Additionally, Tokuda appeared in documentaries such as Mr. Yunioshi: An Asian Perspective (2009) and Going Back to Xanadu (2008), where she reflected on her role in Xanadu.

As a director, Tokuda has helmed several benefit performances and showcases, including The Aloha Concert, Hero, Very Funny People, and EWP's holiday show The Nisei Widows Club: Holiday On Thin Ice. She has also directed scenes for ABC Television's Diversity Showcases, contributing to the promotion of diverse talent in the industry.

== Advocacy and arts administration ==
In addition to her acting career, Tokuda has made significant contributions to the Asian American arts community through her work with East West Players. In 2002, she became EWP's first Arts Education Director, where she oversaw educational programming and advocated for increased visibility of Asian Americans in the media. Her leadership in this role was instrumental in nurturing emerging talent and promoting diversity in the arts. Tokuda retired from the position in 2016.

Tokuda is also a founding member of Cold Tofu, the first Asian American comedy group, where she served as artistic director for six years. She works with Oku & Associates, providing diversity training for Fortune 500 companies, and represents EWP on the Asian Pacific American Media Coalition (APAMC). In 2012, she and Guy Aoki became co-chairs of APAMC, where they work with television networks to evaluate and improve the representation of Asian Pacific Americans in the media.

== Personal life ==
Tokuda married the actor and editor, Daniel Perrett, in 1981 in Washington.
