= Wanda Ramey =

American television news reporter

- Born: Wanda Jane Ramey; February 18, 1924; Terre Haute, Indiana, United States
- Died: August 15, 2009; Greenbrae, California
- Education: Indiana State University
- Occupation: Television News Anchor
- Years active: 1950's–1970's
- Title: Television Newscaster / Anchor
- Spouse: Richard W. Queirolo
- Children: Kristi Louise Queirolo Steadman
- Parent(s): Hiram Ramey; Mae Stewart

Wanda Ramey (February 18, 1924 in Terre Haute, Indiana – August 15, 2009 in Greenbrae, California) was a pioneering American television news reporter. She was married to Richard Queirolo and assumed his name, but continued to use her maiden name in her professional life.

== Early life and education ==
Ramey was born in Terre Haute, Indiana, to parents Hiram and May Ramey. She attended school (graduated high school in 1941) and college in Terre Haute, receiving a BA degree in radio journalism from Indiana State Teachers College in 1945.

After college graduation, she moved with her family to Oakland, California, due to a transfer in her father's company (American Express). She lived there for a while, then moved to Los Angeles, and began working, first at a recording studio and then in the movie theater division of Warner Brothers.

== Broadcasting career ==
Ramey's first post-college radio employment was at radio station KPIK in San Luis Obispo, California. After that, she returned to the Bay area and worked at several stations. In 1947, her job (for KSFO) was to interview celebrities at the Hearst Ranch near Pleasanton, California.

In 1948, Ramey was hired as secretary to the program director of radio station KWBR in Oakland. She assumed the duties of program director (although with no increase in pay) when that post became vacant. After a year there, she moved to KROW, where she was able to be on the air.

By 1952, she was working at KGO-TV in San Francisco. She first hosted Midday with Wanda, a short-lived news and interview show, then in 1954 she hosted The Woman Behind the Man (interviewing the wives of famous Bay-area men).

The KGO job did not last long. Vince Francis, KGO general manager, fired her by telling her that women did not do a good job as newscasters. It took her several months to find another broadcasting job, this time at KCBS (AM) radio in San Francisco. On that job, her on-air name was Jane Todd. She hosted the program Meet Me at Manning's, which featured interviews with women.

In 1957, Ramey was hired as a newscaster by KPIX-TV, San Francisco's first television station. The station was one of the first to create a half-hour news program at mid-day, and they made further history by casting one of the first female newscasters (Ramey) on the program. She was variously referred to as "Channel 5's Gal on the Go", "Girl on the Beat", and "Woman on the Beat". She left KPIX in 1967.

Ramey estimated that she had interviewed some 1,200 personalities in the course of her career, including several US Presidents and an astronaut. Her most memorable interview was with Eleanor Roosevelt, who was Ramey's own inspiration as a girl.

After 1967 Ramey avoided further full-time broadcasting work. She served as a Bay-area correspondent with the Voice of America, worked part-time at local PBS station KQED-TV, and volunteered with Bay-area charities and projects. During the late 1960s, she worked as a reporter on KGO-TVs Newsbeat nightly newscast.

== Work with prisons ==
On New Year's Eve 1960, Ramey and her husband visited San Quentin State Prison to film a story about conditions there. The visit led to their setting up a local television station within the prison (SQTV), prison-sponsored with much of the production work performed by inmates.

== Honors and awards ==
In 1958, Ramey received an Emmy Award for television journalism. She was inducted into the Marin Women's Hall of Fame in the 1990s.

In 1965, Ramey was named "Honorary Inmate" by the residents of San Quentin State Prison.

In 1968, Ramey received the Distinguished Alumni Award from Indiana State University.

In 1982, Ramey received a commendation from the San Francisco Board of Supervisors for her outstanding contributions to broadcasting. That same year SF Mayor Dianne Feinstein issued a proclamation commending Ramey for "her dedication and invaluable contributions to the broadcasting industry and . . . on her truly impressive and distinguished achievements." She also received the Outstanding Achievement in Broadcasting Award from the American Women In Radio and Television, Golden Gate Chapter, and several other awards from professional societies.

== Personal life ==
Ramey entered the broadcast world at a time when women were not often considered for serious reporting slots. Describing the young Ramey in San Francisco, TV personality Terrence O'Flaherty said "Miss Ramey, an intelligent and attractive young woman, is single and also very serious about her work."

In 1958, Ramey married Richard "Dick" Queirolo (Q-Rolo), a sheet-metal contractor and artist. She assumed her husband's last name after marriage, but remained Wanda Ramey in her professional life, and that is how she was known nationally. They had a daughter, Kristi Queirolo Steadman (born 1962) of Novato, California married to Dan Steadman and son Richard Jr. (from a previous marriage of Richard Queirolo) of Highlands Ranch, Colorado. Queirolo developed an interest in the mechanics of his wife's career, and after their marriage developed a vocation as TV cameraman, often working with and for his wife.

In 1963, Ramey was featured in a newspaper article titled "From Fashion Shows to Fires, Wanda Ramey Is KPIX's Woman-on-the-Beat". The article described Ramey as calm and reserved, petite and mild-mannered.... one of the few women in broadcasting who successfully manages to polish the rough corners off the hard news". It stated Ramey was chosen because of her flexibility and her ability to interview celebrities and political figures.

Ramey died of cancer at her home in Greenbrae on August 15, 2009. Upon her death her family established a scholarship fund in her name (Wanda Ramey Scholarship in Communication) at Indiana State University.

Longtime friend (and godmother of Ramey's daughter) Phyllis Diller said of Ramey:

"Having Wanda for a friend is like having a million dollars in your checking account."

== See also ==
- Dorothy Fuldheim - first prominent American female television newscaster
