= Dawn Mason =

American politician and activist

Member of the Washington House of Representatives from the 37th district
- In office January 1, 1995 – December 31, 1999 Serving with Kip Tokuda
- Preceded by: Jesse Wineberry
- Succeeded by: Sharon Tomiko Santos

Personal details
- Born: Dawn Taylor; July 2, 1945 (age 81) Jersey City, New Jersey
- Party: Democratic
- Spouse: Joseph Mason
- Children: 7
- Education: Evergreen State College (BA); Antioch University (M.Ed)

Dawn Mason (née Taylor; born July 2, 1945) is an American politician and activist who served in the Washington House of Representatives from the 37th district from 1995 to 1999. She is an African-American rights activist and is currently an advisor for the Africatown Landtrust in Seattle's Central District and chair of the board for King County Equity Now.
