= Teresa Mosqueda =

American politician and activist (born 1980)

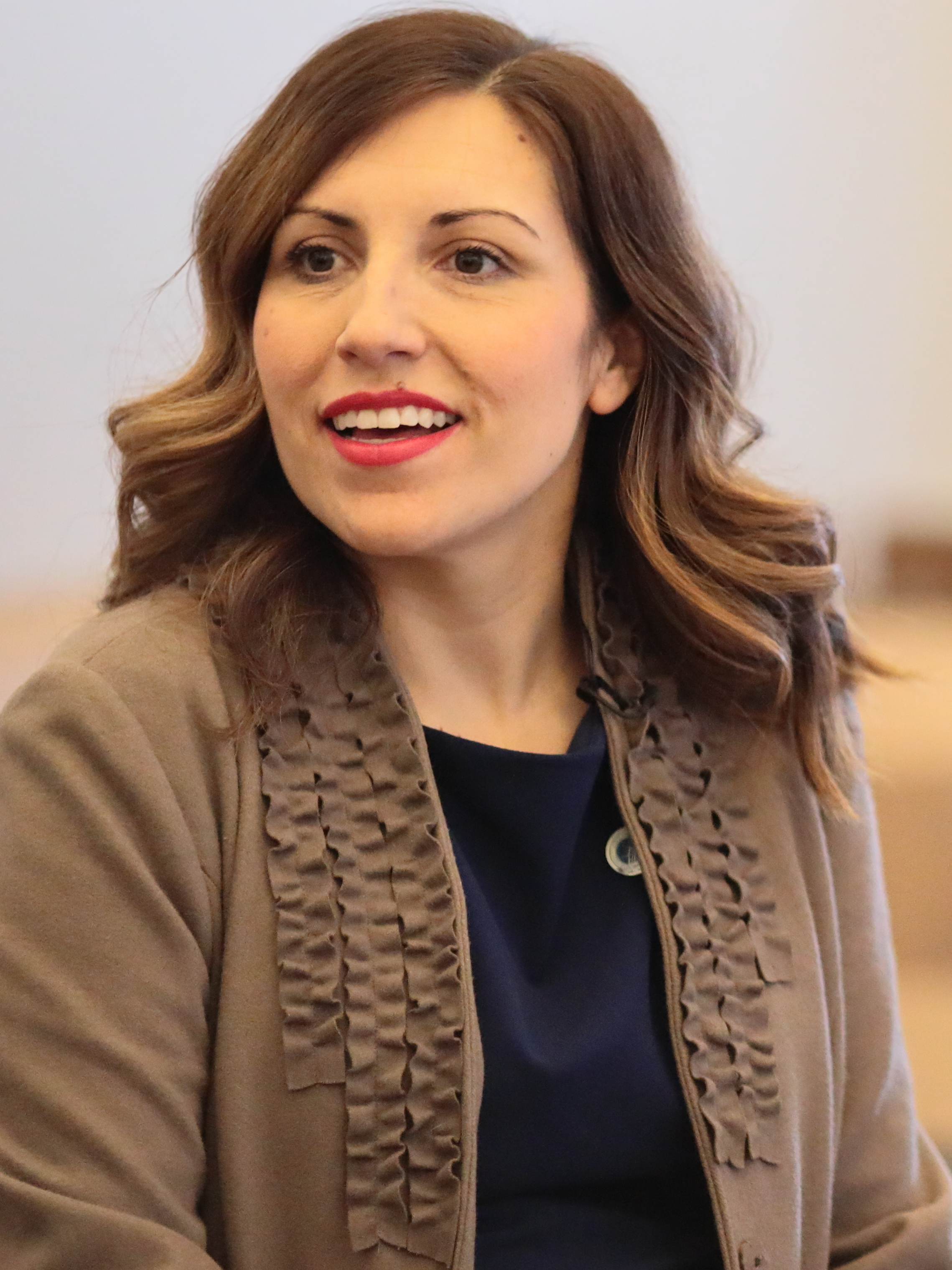

Member of the King County Council for the 8th district
- Incumbent
- Assumed office January 9, 2024
- Preceded by: Joe McDermott

Member of the Seattle City Council for the 8th district
- In office November 28, 2017 – January 2, 2024
- Preceded by: Kirsten Harris-Talley
- Succeeded by: Tanya Woo

Personal details
- Born: Teresa Carmen Mosqueda; July 4, 1980 (age 46) Olympia, Washington, U.S.
- Party: Democratic
- Spouse: Manuel Valdes
- Children: 1
- Education: University of Washington (BA); Evergreen State College (MPA)

Teresa Carmen Mosqueda (born July 4, 1980) is an American politician and labor activist from Seattle, Washington. She is a King County Council member and has represented District 8 since 2024. Mosqueda was a member of the Seattle City Council from 2017 to 2023, in at-large position 8.

== Early life and career ==
Mosqueda was born in Olympia, Washington, and is of third-generation Mexican descent on her father's side and Polish/Swedish/Norwegian on her mother's. She grew up in a middle-income, politically active household. Mosqueda frequently attended protests with her family, including the WTO protests. Mosqueda attended the University of Washington and earned a Master of Public Administration from Evergreen State College.

After college, Mosqueda worked on health advocacy at nonprofit organizations, including Sea Mar, which assists Latino seniors with their medical insurance, and the Children's Alliance. She also worked on health policy at the Washington State Department of Health and a health care specialist at the Community Health Plan of Washington. Mosqueda then became the political campaign director for the Washington State Labor Council, AFL-CIO and sat on the Health Benefit Exchange Board. In November 2013, she was the only member of the Exchange who voted against increasing the salary of the health exchange's CEO by 13%.

== Seattle City Council ==
=== Elections ===
In 2017, Mosqueda ran for the open at-large District 8 position on the Seattle city council after incumbent Tim Burgess announced he would not seek reelection, later becoming interim mayor of Seattle. In the August primary, she came in first against seven other challengers, earning 31% of the vote, with affordable housing activist Jon Grant also advancing to the general with 26%. Both Mosqueda and Grant ran as progressives, with Mosqueda running as an "insider" and was endorsed by labor unions and the Young Democrats of King County, while Grant was running as an "outsider" and endorsed by the Democratic Socialists of America and Socialist city council member Kshama Sawant.

In the November general election, Mosqueda defeated Grant, 60% to 40%. She immediately took office once the election was certified due to the vacancy left by Burgess.

In 2021, Mosqueda announced that she would seek reelection and not run in the Mayor election. She faced ten challengers in the primary election, significantly outraising all of them and received more endorsements from elected leaders and labor unions. In the August primary election, Mosqueda came in first with 59% of the vote, and structural engineer Kenneth Wilson also advancing to the general with 16% of the vote. Mosqueda focused her campaign on addressing economic inequalities in Seattle, while Wilson focused on fixing major infrastructure like bridges.

In the November general election, Mosqueda defeated Wilson in a landslide, 59% to 40%.

=== Tenure ===
In her first year on council, Mosqueda passed legislation to protect domestic workers and voted no on repealing the controversial Seattle head tax, which was meant to build affordable housing and pay for homelessness services. During her first term she also led the push legislation that would give parents access to paid family leave care benefits after the death of a child and if a partner dies during childbirth. Mosqueda was the prime sponsor of the JumpStart tax, which is a payroll tax on large businesses and funds affordable housing and Green New Deal policies.

During the 2020 George Floyd protests, Mosqueda, as budget chair, called for a "full, thorough, simultaneous deep dive" into the Seattle Police budget. She also called for 50% cuts into the police budget and reinvest the money into the community. At the end of 2020, Mosqueda and the majority of the council blocked MayorJenny Durkan proposal to increase the SPD budget to cover overtime costs and voted to ensure "out-of-order" layoffs happen in the department.

Mosqueda remained budget chair in her second term during the 2023-24 budget process, with a $141 million deficit and an $82 million revenue shortfall. Mosqueda's budget proposal, which passed with amendments, included eliminating 80 vacant positions at SPD and not funding Mayor Bruce Harrell's policy proposals, like the Shotspotter program.

On January 2, 2024, Mosqueda resigned from the Seattle City Council after being elected to the King County Council.

== King County Council ==
In 2023, Mosqueda ran for the 8th district seat on the King County Council in 2023 following the retirement of incumbent Joe McDermott. In the August primary, she came in first against two other challengers and advanced to the general election with Burien mayor Sofia Aragon. Mosqueda and Aragon clashed on public safety, with Mosqueda defending her support of reducing the SPD budget and Aragon defending Burien's camping ban. In the November general election, Mosqueda defeated Aragon, 55% to 44%.

Mosqueda joined the county council on January 9 as one of its first Latino American members alongside Jorge Barón.

== Personal life ==
Mosqueda is married to Associated Press journalist Manuel Valdes. She lived in an apartment in the Queen Anne neighborhood until buying a townhouse in early 2019 in North Delridge. In April 2019 it was announced Mosqueda was the first sitting Seattle city councilmember to be pregnant, and she gave birth to a baby girl in October 2019.

== Electoral history ==
Seattle City Council Position 8, Primary Election 2017
Party	Candidate	Votes	%
Nonpartisan	Teresa Mosqueda	53,676	31.59%
Nonpartisan	Jon Grant	45,653	26.87%
Nonpartisan	Sara Nelson	36,495	21.48%
Nonpartisan	Rudy Pantoja	8,704	5.12%
Nonpartisan	Sheley Secrest	8,467	4.98%
Nonpartisan	Charlene D. Strong	7,562	4.45%
Nonpartisan	Hisam Goueli	5,407	3.18%
Nonpartisan	Mac McGregor	3,444	2.03%
Nonpartisan	Write-in	486	0.29%
Turnout		187,741	40.49%
Registered electors		463,660	

Seattle City Council Position 8, General Election 2017
Party	Candidate	Votes	%
Nonpartisan	Teresa Mosqueda	121,192	59.49%
Nonpartisan	Jon Grant	81,302	39.91%
Nonpartisan	Write-in	1,239	0.61%
Majority		39,890	19.58%
Turnout		224,808	49.21%
Registered electors		456,871	

Seattle City Council Position 8, Primary Election 2021
Party	Candidate	Votes	%
Nonpartisan	Teresa Mosqueda	113,052	59.37%
Nonpartisan	Kenneth Wilson	30,862	16.21%
Nonpartisan	Kate Martin	21,997	11.55%
Nonpartisan	Paul Felipe Glumaz	10,228	5.37%
Nonpartisan	Alexander White	2,474	1.30%
Nonpartisan	Bobby Lindsey Miller	2,474	1.28%
Nonpartisan	Write-in	2,075	1.09%
Nonpartisan	Jordaan Elizabeth Fisher	1,810	.95%
Nonpartisan	George Freeman	1,575	0.83%
Nonpartisan	Alex Tsimerman	961	0.50%
Nonpartisan	Brian Fahey	887	0.47%
Turnout		206,814	41.91%
Registered electors		493,453	

Seattle City Council Position 8, General Election 2021
Party	Candidate	Votes	%
Nonpartisan	Teresa Mosqueda	149,589	59.40%
Nonpartisan	Kenneth Wilson	101,168	40.17%
Nonpartisan	Write-in	1,074	0.43%
Majority		48,421	19.23%
Turnout		267,414	54.57%
Registered electors		489,996	

King County Council District 8, Primary Election 2023
Party	Candidate	Votes	%
Nonpartisan	Teresa Mosqueda	28,966	57.57%
Nonpartisan	Sofia Aragon	18,900	37.56%
Nonpartisan	GoodSpaceGuy	2,216	4.40%
Nonpartisan	Write-in	234	.47%
Turnout		53,296	33.68%
Registered electors		158,252	

King County Council District 8, General Election 2023
Party	Candidate	Votes	%
Nonpartisan	Teresa Mosqueda	33,921	55.01%
Nonpartisan	Sofia Aragon	27,553	44.68%
Nonpartisan	Write-in	194	0.31%
Majority		6,368	10.33%
Turnout		65,198	41.13%
Registered electors		158,506	
