= Dave McElhatton =

David William McElhatton (December 8, 1928 – August 23, 2010) was an evening news anchor for several decades in San Francisco, California, in the United States. He was in the first class of inductees to the Bay Area Radio Hall of Fame. He retired in 2000.

McElhatton was sometimes called "Mac"

== Early life ==
An Oakland, California native, McElhatton attended San Francisco State College (now San Francisco State University). He received a B.A. in liberal arts from that institution in 1951.

== Career ==
=== Radio career ===
McElhatton worked for KCBS Radio in San Francisco for 25 years, starting two weeks after college graduation. Early in his career, he hosted an all-night radio show, "Music 'til Dawn".

In the early 1960s, he was the host of "McElhatton In The Morning", a blend of news and comedy, with his sidekick Homer "Friendly Clyde" Welch.

He later hosted a radio program called "Viewpoint", which was the area's first telephone talk show. McElhatton later became news director of KCBS radio, where he helped change the format of the station to an all-news format.

=== Television news career ===
While working in radio at KCBS, McElhatton (along with Friendly Clyde) hosted TV Bingo, a daytime show on KTVU Channel 2.

McElhatton became a television news anchor for KPIX-TV Channel 5, the first television station in San Francisco, starting in 1977 upon leaving KCBS radio. The hiring of McElhatton, a radio broadcaster, was noted by some to be a bold stroke. He remained as a news anchor with KPIX until his retirement in 2000. He was noted, along with CBS newsman Walter Cronkite, to be among two good reporters during a forum by U.S. Senator Dianne Feinstein.

At his peak, McElhatton's salary as a newscaster was reportedly approximately $750,000 per year. For a decade from the late 1970s to the late 1980s, his co-anchor was Wendy Tokuda, with whom he maintained personal contact. Tokuda left KPIX for KNBC in Los Angeles in 1992, but rejoined KPIX in 2007. During McElhatton's career in television, the news program that he anchored was frequently the top-rated news broadcast in the Bay Area in terms of audience size.

McElhatton had several film credits, including Cardiac Arrest (1980) and Thief of Hearts (1984). In Alfred Hitchcock's Vertigo (1958), Hitchcock filmed a never-used 1-minute scene showing Midge Wood (Barbara Bel Geddes) and Scottie Ferguson (James Stewart) listening to a radio report that the murderer had been arrested in Europe — the unseen radio announcer in this scene (included as an extra on the DVD release of Vertigo) originally was McElhatton, but in his place are the dubbed-in voices of the film's restorers Robert A. Harris and James C. Katz.

In 2006, the Bay Area Radio Hall of Fame was created. McElhatton was among the inaugural inductees.

McElhatton was a guest lecturer at San Francisco State University in the Broadcast and Electronic Communications Department until the mid-1980s.

== Retirement ==
McElhatton's first wife was Jeanne McElhatton, a pioneering aviator. McElhatton's second wife, Bonnie Chastain, died in 1988. He lived with his third wife, Karen, in the Palm Desert, California area. In late 2004, he suffered a mild stroke, but reportedly was recuperating and doing fine in 2005. McElhatton's son Terry, former news director at KNTV in San Jose, died in June 2008. McElhatton died Monday, August 23, 2010 of a stroke-related illness in Rancho Mirage. McElhatton was survived by his third wife, Karen, as well as two children and eight grandchildren. He was 81.

== Awards ==
- Excellence in Journalism Award, Society of Professional Journalists, Northern California Chapter, 1988 for distinguished career.
- Alumni Hall of Fame (San Francisco State University), 1996
- Governor's Award, Northern California Emmy Presentation. 1999
- Associated Press Television-Radio Association's Lifetime Achievement Award, 2003
- Bay Area Radio Hall of Fame, Class of 2006

== Filmography ==
- Vertigo (1958) - Radio Announcer - European Version Only (voice, uncredited)
- Cardiac Arrest (1980) - Newscaster
- Thief of Hearts (1984) - Himself (final film role)
