= Seattle head tax =

Repealed tax law in Seattle, Washington, U.S.

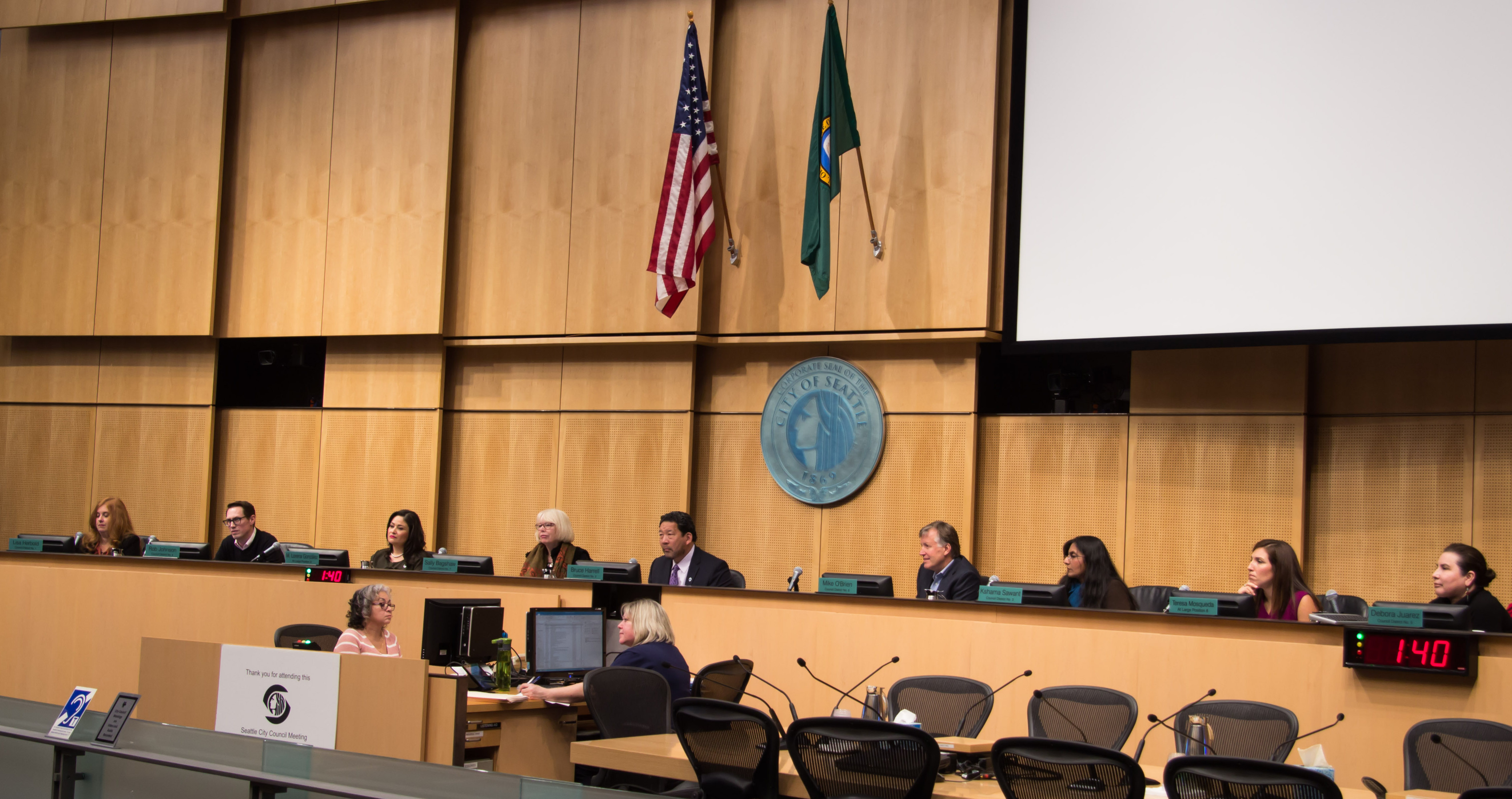
The Seattle City Council voted 9–0 to pass the employee hours tax in May 2018, but repealed it a month later in a 7–2 vote

The Seattle head tax, officially the employee hours tax (EHT), was a proposed poll tax to be levied on large employers in Seattle, Washington, United States. The head tax was proposed in 2017 to fund homeless services and outreach and was set at a rate of $275 annually per employee, with hopes of raising up to $50 million annually.

The controversial head tax ordinance was passed by the Seattle City Council in May 2018 and was signed into law by Mayor Jenny Durkan, to be in effect for five years before consideration for renewal. The tax was criticized for targeting Amazon, the city's largest employer, and was opposed by the business community. A citizen referendum was planned by business groups and gathered enough signatures to qualify for an upcoming election, but the city council repealed the head tax less than a month later.

== Background ==
Mayor Greg Nickels proposed an employee hours tax, dubbed a "head tax" by the local media, of $25 per employee in 2006 to fund sidewalk and street maintenance. The tax exempted employees that used carpool, transit, bicycling, or walking to commute and charged a partial tax on part-time employees. The city council adopted the head tax as part of the "Bridging the Gap" transportation levy, which was approved by voters in the November 2006 election. It took effect on July 1, 2007, and was expected to raise $51.5 million over the nine-year span of the levy.

The tax was immediately unpopular with businesses and was campaigned against by new city councilmember Tim Burgess and two challengers to Nickels in the 2009 mayoral election. Nickels, along with councilmembers Burgess and Richard Conlin, proposed to repeal the head tax in June 2009, amid the economic recession. The head tax raised $4.7 million in 2008, falling below the forecast of $5.5 million. Nickels later withdrew his support of the repeal, but the council's budget committee voted 8–1 in November to repeal the tax in order to stimulate business growth.

City councilmembers Kshama Sawant and Nick Licata attempted to revive the head tax in 2014 to fund King County Metro service after the agency announced that its reduced revenue would lead to reduced bus service hours. The $18 per employee tax was opposed by downtown businesses and not considered by the city council, who instead placed a vehicle registration tax that was passed by voters in November 2014. Sawant and Licata unsuccessfully attempted to use the head tax to fund a second transportation levy, which instead relied on a property tax, and later to fund a municipal broadband service, which was rejected for further consideration. A smaller employee hours tax was proposed in a 2016 initiative filed by the local chapter of the Service Employees International Union to fund a city labor oversight office, but it failed to reach the ballot.

=== Homelessness and housing affordability ===
In November 2015, mayor Ed Murray and county executive Dow Constantine declared a "state of emergency" over the region's ongoing homelessness crisis, citing an increase in the number of homeless individuals. Seattle and King County spent over $196 million in 2017 to address homelessness issues, using federal housing funds and their respective general funds. In 2017, Mayor Murray proposed a $275 million property tax levy to fund permanent housing units and mental health treatment over a five-year period. Murray withdrew the proposal in favor of a potential countywide ballot measure that would use sales taxes to fund similar programs. According to an independent report released in early 2018, King County would need up to 14,000 additional affordable housing units to house the homeless, costing $410 million annually. In a March 2018 poll of likely voters by FM3 Research, 80 percent of respondents were dissatisfied with the city's approach to affordable housing and 83 percent were dissatisfied with the addressing of the homelessness crisis.

== Proposal and political debate ==
The head tax proposal was revived once again in late 2017 by councilmembers Mike O'Brien and Kirsten Harris-Talley, using $100 per employee to generate $24 million in annual revenue for homeless re-housing programs. The proposal was opposed by businesses but drew partial support from mayoral candidates Jenny Durkan and Cary Moon. The proposed tax was increased to $125 per employee and rejected by the city council in November, by a 5–4 margin.

In its rejection of the head tax proposal, the city council also convened a task force to investigate alternative revenue sources before revisiting the use of a head tax. The tax force recommended the adoption of a $75 million head tax, at a rate of up to $480 per employee, to fund homelessness services. The proposal was once again criticized by a consortium of business leaders as a tax on jobs or one targeted at Amazon, also accusing the city government of ineffectively using taxpayer revenue allocated for homelessness services.

The full proposal was released in April 2018, outlining a tax on large employers with annual revenues of over $20 million, of which roughly 500 businesses would be affected. The tax would generate $75 million in annual revenue with a per-employee tax of $540, but would be replaced by a 0.7 percent payroll tax in 2021. A study from the city council stated that 75 percent of the revenue would be used to build 2,000 units of affordable housing, while 20 percent would be used on homeless services.

Mayor Durkan and business groups requested several modifications to the proposed head tax, mainly in the form of a lowered rate and the specific exemption of smaller businesses. Amazon responded to the head tax proposal by threatening to halt development of a new downtown office tower and explore subleasing for its space in the Rainier Square Tower, affecting 7,000 potential jobs. A compromise proposal was announced by Durkan on May 10, reducing the per-employee rate to $250 and replacing the proposed payroll tax with a five-year period for the head tax, which would only generate $40 million per year. Durkan's proposal was rejected by a split vote of the city council's finance committee the following day, instead favoring the original $75 million version of the head tax.

On May 14, the city council unanimously passed Durkan's compromise version of the head tax after the mayor threatened to veto the larger head tax, which did not have a large enough majority to override a mayoral veto. The compromise was reached after several meetings between the mayor and the four councilmembers who had supported the larger head tax proposal. Mayor Durkan signed the head tax ordinance into law on May 16, pledging to build 600 new affordable housing units and subsidizing additional units and beds at homeless shelters. The approved version of the $275 per-employee head tax would generate $47 million from businesses with gross revenues of over $20 million, affecting about 3 percent of businesses in the city. Amazon would provide an estimated $10 million of the annual revenue, due to its 45,000 employees in the city. The head tax was scheduled to take effect on January 1, 2019, and require renewal by a full council vote in 2023.

=== Opposition and repeal ===
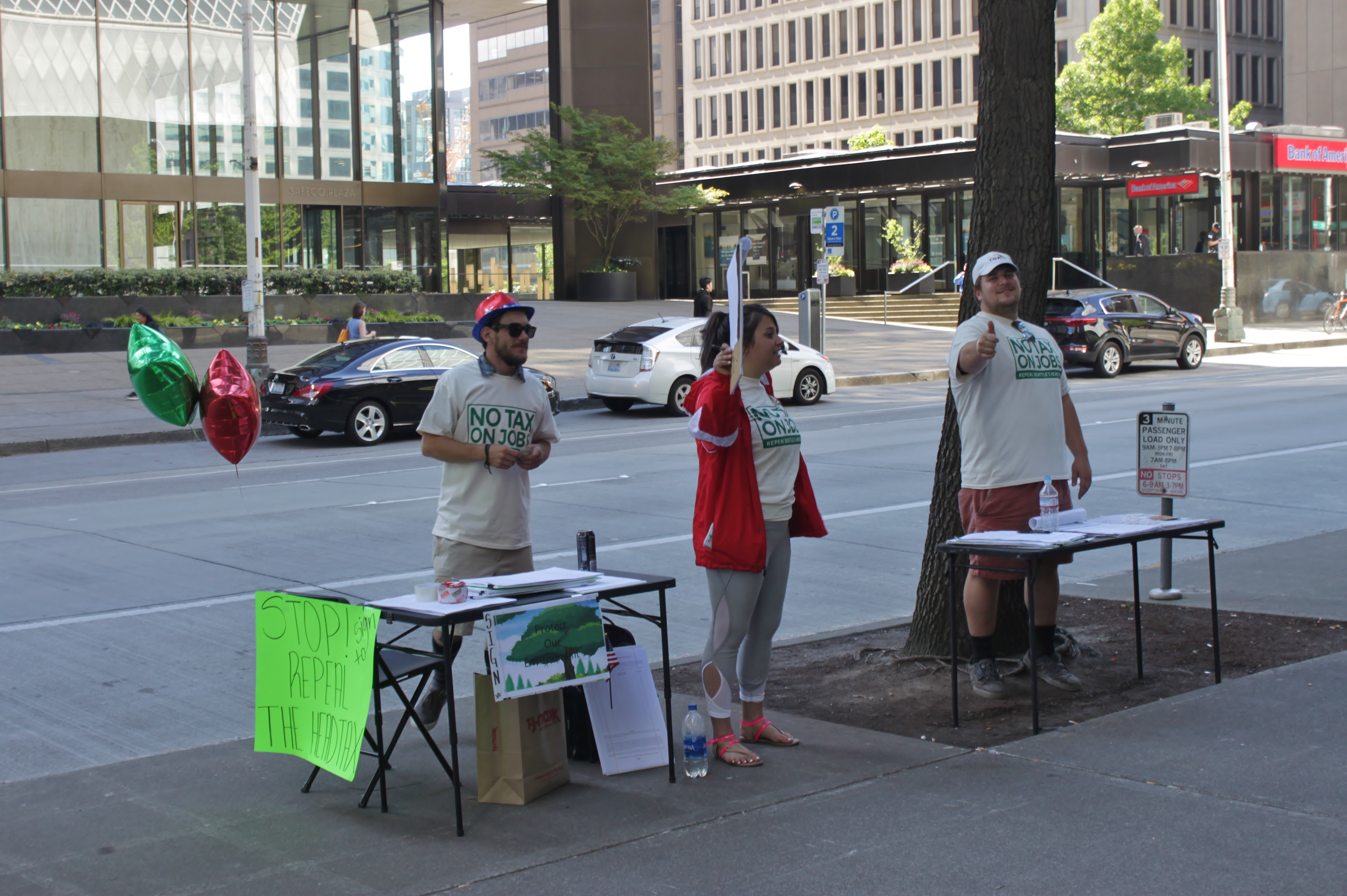
Signature-gatherers for the No Tax on Jobs campaign, seen at the Seattle Central Library in late May

The city's largest employers, including Amazon and Starbucks, and several construction labor unions released statements criticizing the city council's decision and its approach to addressing homelessness. Business groups who remained opposed to the head tax responded days later with the formation of a campaign to overturn the city council decision through a citizens' initiative. The campaign, named "No Tax on Jobs", received $325,000 in committed donations from local economic development groups and businesses, including Amazon, Starbucks, Kroger (owners of Fred Meyer and QFC), Albertsons (owners of Safeway), and Vulcan, Inc. The campaign was given until June 14 to collect 17,600 valid signatures to bring the initiative to the November 2018 ballot, and reportedly surpassed the threshold by June 11 using on-street petitioning by 2,000 volunteers.

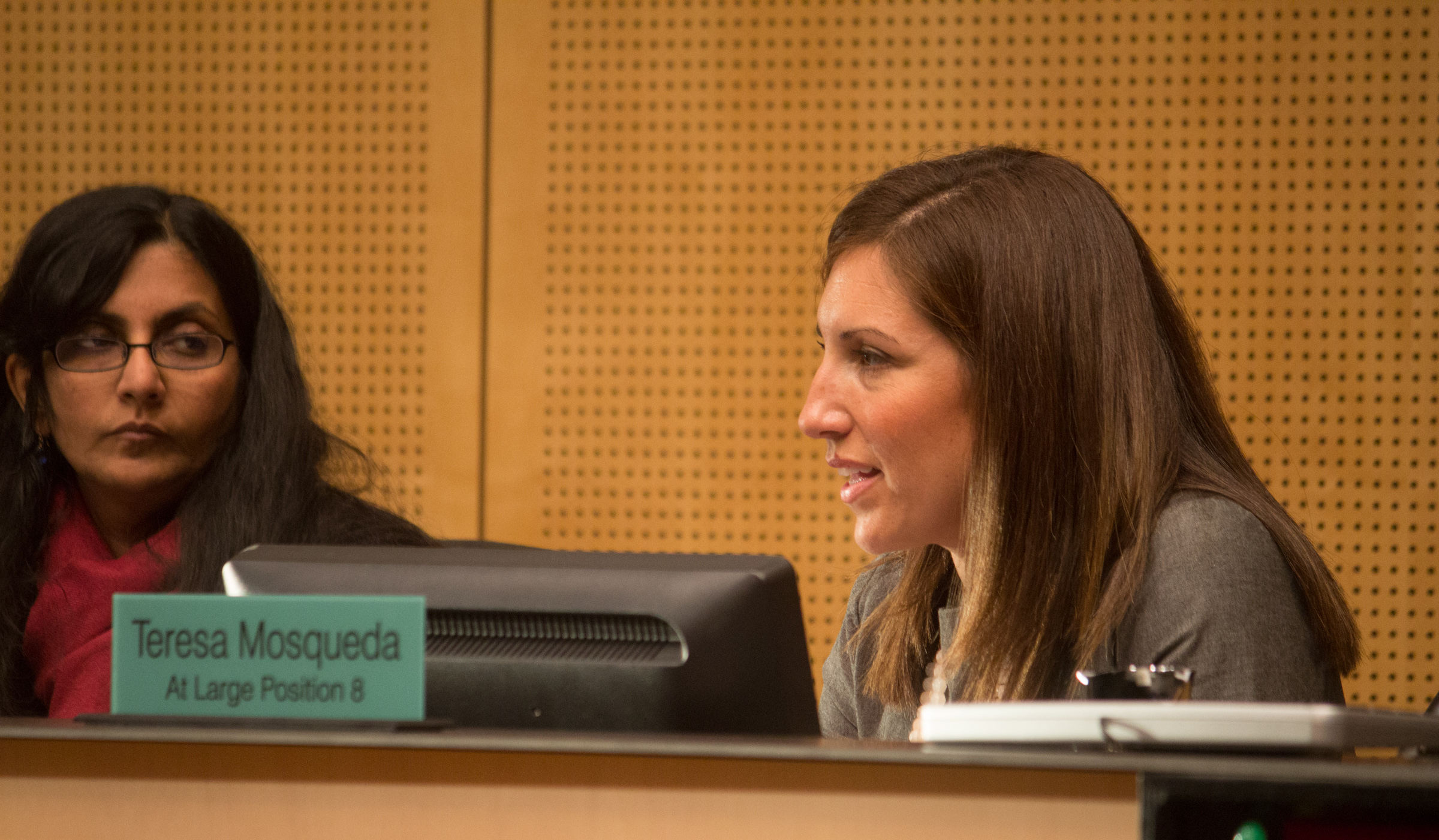
Kshama Sawant (left) and Teresa Mosqueda (right) were the two dissenting councilmembers in the 7–2 vote to repeal the head tax

On June 11, less than a month after the unanimous approval of the head tax, the city council announced plans for a special session to consider repealing the tax, to be held the following day. The seven councilmembers who are up for re-election in 2019, along with Mayor Durkan, voiced their support for the repeal in the wake of the initiative's signature-gathering campaign. The repeal was passed by a 7–2 vote of the city council, despite several interruptions from supporters of the tax. The two dissenting councilmembers, Sawant and Teresa Mosqueda, criticized the repeal for being unaccountable and a "cowardly betrayal". The 24-hour notice for the special session was also criticized for being potentially in violation of the state's advance notice laws.

== Aftermath ==
In response to Seattle's head tax, officials from Tacoma and Pierce County announced a $275 tax credit per employee for new jobs to lure businesses. Business leaders from the Eastside area of King County sought to use the head tax to promote suburban job creation, but feared that Seattle's head tax would cause businesses to leave or avoid the region entirely. Other large metropolitan areas in the Western United States, such as Phoenix, began recruiting Seattle-area businesses for potential moves, citing lower taxes and cost of living.

Seattle's head tax inspired similar proposals in the Silicon Valley region of California, which shares similar housing affordability and homelessness problems. The cities of San Francisco, Mountain View, Cupertino, and East Palo Alto all released proposals to tax large businesses, targeted at large tech companies. Mountain View and San Francisco both proposed to introduce a head tax to fund homelessness services on a ballot measure; Mountain View would charge $8 to $149 per employee to fund $6 million in transportation and affordable housing programs, while San Francisco's would raise up to $300 million annually for homeless services. Both ballot measures were passed in the November 2018 elections.

== JumpStart Seattle ==
In June 2020, councilmember Teresa Mosqueda proposed a new employer tax that would be based on the number of highly paid employees rather than total employees. The plan, named "JumpStart Seattle", would affect companies with annual payrolls above $7 million and levy a 0.7 to 2.4 percent tax on employees making more than $150,000 in annual income. The tax would provide additional revenue to fill a funding gap caused by the COVID-19 pandemic and generate $214 million in 2021. The JumpStart Seattle plan was passed 7–2 in a full council vote on July 6, 2020, with mayor Jenny Durkan voicing her objections to the bill being passed without a detailed spending plan. The tax became law without mayor Durkan's signature. The employer tax will be used as part of a $86 million COVID-19 relief package for residents and small businesses that was approved on July 20. Mayor Durkan vetoed the bill on August 1, calling the plan "irresponsible".

== See also ==
- Government and politics of Seattle
- Homelessness in Seattle
