= KPIX-TV =

Television station in San Francisco

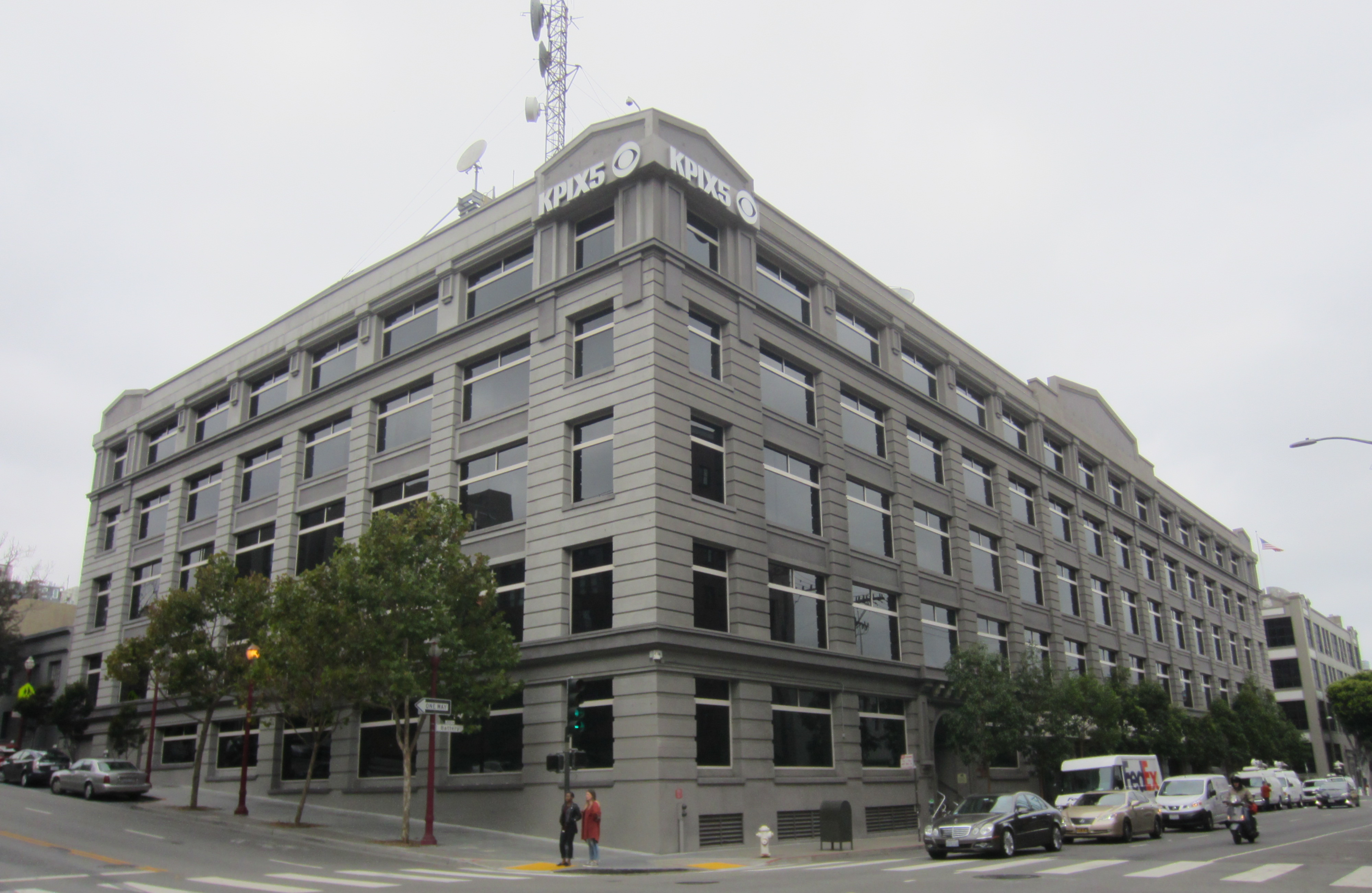
- The KPIX 5 studio building at the corner of Battery and Broadway Streets in San Francisco (2018)
- San Francisco–Oakland–; San Jose, California; United States
- City: San Francisco, California
- Channels: Digital: 29 (UHF); Virtual: 5
- Branding: KPIX; CBS Bay Area; CBS News Bay Area

Programming
- Affiliations: 5.1: CBS; for others, see § Subchannels

Ownership
- Owner: CBS Television Stations; (CBS Broadcasting Inc.)
- Sister stations: KPYX

History
- First air date: December 22, 1948
- Former call signs: KWIS (CP, 1946–1948)
- Former channel numbers: Analog: 5 (VHF, 1948–2009)
- Former affiliations: All secondary: NBC (1948–1949); DuMont (1949–1956); Paramount (1949–1956)
- Call sign meaning: "PIX" is an abbreviation of "pictures"

Technical information
- Licensing authority: FCC
- Facility ID: 25452
- ERP: 1,000 kW
- HAAT: 490.3 m (1,609 ft)
- Transmitter coordinates: 37°45′19″N 122°27′10″W

Links
- Public license information: Public file; LMS
- Website: www.cbsnews.com/sanfrancisco/

KPIX-TV (channel 5), branded as CBS Bay Area, is a television station licensed to San Francisco, California, United States, serving the San Francisco Bay Area. It is owned and operated by the CBS television network through its CBS Television Stations division, and is sister to KPYX (channel 44), an independent station. The two outlets share studios at Broadway and Battery Street, in San Francisco's North Waterfront district; KPIX's transmitter is located atop Sutro Tower. In addition to KPYX, KPIX shares its building with formerly co-owned radio stations KCBS, KFRC-FM, KITS, KLLC, KRBQ and KZDG (all now owned by Audacy, Inc.), although they use a different address number for Battery Street (865 as opposed to 855).

== History ==
KPIX signed on the air on December 22, 1948, the first television station in Northern California as well as the 49th in the United States. It was originally owned by Associated Broadcasters, owners of KSFO (560 AM). Initially, channel 5's signal was transmitted from the top of the Mark Hopkins Hotel on Nob Hill. It later moved to a transmitter tower shared with KGO-TV (channel 7) at the Sutro Mansion (which was located midway between Mount Sutro and Twin Peaks), and then to the Sutro Tower in 1973. KPIX's first master control room was in the attic of the Mark Hopkins Hotel (just above the "Top of the Mark" bar).

The station immediately joined CBS due to a deal KSFO's owners had worked out with the television network one year earlier. KSFO was CBS radio's Bay Area affiliate from 1937 to 1941, when Associated Broadcasters backed out of a deal for CBS to buy the station. When KSFO was still affiliated with CBS, it was originally slated to move to 740 AM, the frequency of San Jose's KQW. 740 AM was the last 50,000-watt frequency available in the Bay Area, and KSFO was to raise its power to 50,000 watts after moving to 740. However, after KSFO parted ways with CBS radio, the network moved its Bay Area affiliation to KQW and was not about to give up the advantage of owning the Bay Area's last available 50,000-watt station. After lengthy Federal Communications Commission (FCC) hearings, KSFO won the 740 frequency, but later decided to stay at 560 and concentrate its efforts on building a television station. It traded the 740 frequency to CBS in return for getting the CBS television network affiliation for the Bay Area. KQW remained at 740 and its call sign was changed to KCBS.

The station also carried programming from DuMont until that network folded in 1956. It even carried a few NBC programs until KRON-TV (channel 4) signed on on November 15, 1949, and programs from the short-lived Paramount Television Network, such as Frosty Frolics, Time For Beany, Cowboy G-Men and Bandstand Revue.

When KPIX's first competitor, KGO-TV, signed on on May 5, 1949, KPIX produced programs to welcome it into the Bay Area. KPIX cameras were used on the first episode of the CBS News program See It Now on November 18, 1951, which opened with the first live simultaneous coast-to-coast TV transmission from both the East Coast (the Brooklyn Bridge and New York Harbor) and the West Coast (KPIX-produced images of the Golden Gate Bridge and San Francisco–Oakland Bay Bridge), under the narration of Edward R. Murrow. Under its first general manager, Phil Lasky, KPIX gained an early reputation for news coverage, being noted for originating national CBS coverage of the Japanese Peace Conference of 1951 (the event which "officially" brought an end to World War II, similar to the function that the Treaty of Versailles served for World War I), held in San Francisco (for which Lasky was commended by then-CBS News president Sig Mickelson), as well as local news coverage of the 1953 crash of an Australian airliner while on approach to San Francisco International Airport, and a powder explosion a few weeks afterward at an explosives plant in suburban Hercules. In regards to sports programming, KPIX broadcast the first Bay Area sports telecast on December 22, 1948, with a Pacific Coast Hockey League game between the San Francisco Shamrocks and Oakland Oaks. KPIX originated the annual college football East-West Shrine Game for DuMont, and was the flagship station of the San Francisco Seals of the Pacific Coast League until 1954.

In 1952, KPIX and KSFO moved into a new building at 2655 Van Ness Avenue; KPIX moved out of the facility in 1979, when it relocated to a converted warehouse on the corner of Battery and Broadway streets (855 Battery Street) in the historic San Francisco waterfront area, undergoing revitalization at the time as an extension of the downtown business district. Originally constructed of board-formed reinforced concrete shortly after the 1906 earthquake for the American Biscuit Company (soon to become Nabisco), the five-story structure was extensively refurbished for modern broadcasting by the San Francisco architecture firm M. Arthur Gensler Jr. & Associates. KPIX remains in this space to this day (KSFO moved to studios in the Fairmont Hotel, across the hall from the Tonga Room, in 1955). The studio on Van Ness Avenue (renamed to Bridge Studios after KPIX's departure) was the first building in San Francisco specifically built for television; the game show Starcade taped there after a pilot was taped at KRON-TV's studios (it was demolished in 2006 to make way for a condominium complex).

Westinghouse Electric Corporation bought KPIX in 1954 and ran it as part of the company's Group W broadcasting unit. During Westinghouse's ownership, KPIX was the company's only television station on the West Coast. Additionally, it was one of two VHF stations (along with Pittsburgh's KDKA-TV) that did not have a historic three-letter callsign, and along with WJZ-TV in Baltimore (until 2008) was the only one without a sister radio station with matching callsigns.

In 1994, Westinghouse was looking to make a group-wide affiliation deal for its stations as part of a larger plan to transform itself into a major media conglomerate after WJZ-TV lost its ABC affiliation to Scripps-owned WMAR-TV in an affiliation deal spurred by Fox's affiliation deal with New World Communications. Westinghouse negotiated with NBC and CBS for a deal. While NBC (the highest-rated network during much of the 1980s and 1990s) offered more money, CBS was interested in the programming opportunities Westinghouse offered, due to its own stagnation in programming at the time. CBS also offered a potential merger of their respective radio networks down the road (which ultimately happened), while NBC had abandoned radio in 1987. Ultimately, Westinghouse signed a long-term deal with CBS to convert the entire five-station Group W television unit to a group-wide CBS affiliation, making the San Francisco market one of the few major markets that were not affected by the affiliation switches.

In late 1995, Westinghouse merged with CBS, making KPIX a CBS-owned station and bringing it into common ownership with KCBS radio. Prior to this, KPIX had been CBS' longest-tenured affiliate (a distinction that now belongs to Washington, D.C.'s WUSA-TV, which signed on and affiliated with CBS approximately 4 weeks after KPIX's launch). KPIX was also one of two longtime CBS affiliates owned by Group W that became a CBS O&O, the other being KDKA-TV.

In 2000, the combined Westinghouse/CBS was bought by Viacom, then made a duopoly with UPN affiliate KBHK-TV (after Fox Television Stations traded it to Viacom), and when Viacom split up its assets in December 2005, KPIX and the company's other broadcast properties became part of CBS Corporation. Since May 2003, KPIX-TV and WJZ-TV are the only former Group W TV stations that still use the classic Group W font.

In May 2006, KPIX moved its San Jose news bureau to the Fairmont Tower at 50 W. San Fernando Street—which served as the original site of Charles Herrold's experimental radio broadcasts that were the precursor of KCBS. Although CBS was not aware of the significance of the San Fernando Street address when the move was planned, it quickly recognized and embraced its significance when informed, giving long-overdue credit to one of the inventors of radio broadcasting during the bureau's opening celebration.

On December 4, 2019, CBS Corporation and Viacom remerged into ViacomCBS (now Paramount Global).

=== Branding ===
Former KPIX logo (February 3, 2013 – December 18, 2022)

KPIX's distinctive "5" logo dates back from the station's days under Westinghouse ownership, when the "Group W font" was standard on KPIX and its sister stations after about 1965. When Westinghouse merged with CBS, most of the former Group W stations eventually retired the font. KPIX, along with its Baltimore sister station WJZ-TV would become the only two CBS-owned television stations to continue using this logo font.

KPIX was the only CBS-owned station on the West Coast not to follow the trend of other CBS-owned stations branding themselves as "CBS (channel number)" for years after the merger, simply referencing itself as "KPIX-TV Channel 5". Between 1993 and 1996, it was branded simply as "KPIX 5", even dropping the Eyewitness News title for its newscasts and branding them as KPIX 5 News at the same time, before reverting. In 2003, KPIX fell in line with its sister stations and rebranded as "CBS 5", and later to "CBS 5 Bay Area". On February 3, 2013, KPIX dropped the "CBS 5" branding and reverted to being branded as "KPIX 5", also dropping the Eyewitness News newscast title again, this time for good. KGO-TV eventually picked up the Eyewitness News name on February 1, 2026, making that station consistent with most of its ABC sister stations.

On December 19, 2022, the station rebranded as "KPIX CBS News Bay Area", as the first station to implement a major rebranding of all CBS-owned stations to align themselves with the network's current corporate identity. The rebranding also included new graphics adhering to the network's current "deconstructed eye" branding, and new music by Antfood incorporating the sound trademark it had developed for the network.

== Programming ==
=== Entertainment programs ===
KPIX originated the concept for the entertainment and lifestyle program, Evening Magazine. Evening Magazine debuted on the station in August 1976, and within a year, the concept expanded to the other Group W stations. By Fall 1978, the Evening Magazine format was syndicated to stations around the United States that were not owned by Group W as PM Magazine. The entire Evening/PM Magazine format was canceled by the late 1980s, though Evening Magazine was later resurrected on KPIX in 1998. In 2005, Evening Magazine was retitled Eye on the Bay, to focus further on the San Francisco Bay Area. KBCW also aired day-behind reruns of the program in the early 2000s. In 2007, Eye on the Bay began broadcasting in high definition. Eye on the Bay ended its weekday broadcasts on September 7, 2012, and switched to a weekly program on Saturdays thereafter.

=== Preempted programs ===
For most of the time before Westinghouse bought CBS, KPIX was the network's largest affiliate. Despite this, from the mid-1970s until 1994, it was standard practice for KPIX to preempt CBS' daytime programs (for example, the first season of Tattletales was preempted for reruns of Perry Mason and The Price Is Right at one time could be viewed in the Bay Area only through Sacramento affiliate KXTV). Although CBS made in excess of 30 cuts to the violent content of Death Wish, both KPIX and sister station KDKA-TV preempted the network's 1976 airing of the film, having denounced the remaining violent content of the film and, as well, the apparent endorsement by the film of vigilante violence. Despite the preemptions, CBS was mostly satisfied with KPIX as it was among its highest-rated affiliates. In September 1994, two months after CBS signed a long-term affiliation deal with the Westinghouse stations (just before the two companies merged), KPIX began airing the entire CBS schedule without preemptions except for local news emergencies, as per the agreement between Westinghouse and CBS. However, it continued to run CBS prime time programming one hour earlier than typical for the Pacific Time Zone (from 7 to 10 pm, instead of 8 to 11 pm), a practice dating back to 1992. This ended in 1998, and since then KPIX has aired the entire CBS schedule in pattern. KOVR in Sacramento adopted a similar practice after becoming a CBS affiliate in 1995, and has long maintained this practice after CBS bought the station in 2004. Any preempted shows air on independent sister KPYX.

=== Talk and court shows ===
KPIX was also known for the locally produced morning talk show, People are Talking, which began in 1978 with Ann Fraser and Ross McGowan, and ran until 1991 (the People are Talking format was also syndicated to other Group W stations during this period). On KPIX, the show preempted The Price Is Right for a few years; the game show aired instead on independent stations in the Bay Area such as KOFY-TV (channel 20). At one point, a more celebrity-driven People Are Talking in the Afternoon aired with a small house band. Prior to the launch of the People are Talking franchise, Ann Fraser hosted The Morning Show (essentially a half-hour version of People Are Talking), which replaced The Kathryn Crosby Show, another half-hour talk show hosted by Bing Crosby's wife, Kathryn. Prior to The Kathryn Crosby Show, KPIX aired The Bentley Affair, hosted by Helen Bentley in the late 1960s–early 1970s. During the 1987–88 season, KPIX ran a 90-minute block of court shows from 4:30 to 6 pm: Superior Court, The People's Court and The Judge.

=== Sports ===
During the 1980s, KPIX was the flagship station for the Oakland Athletics baseball team (at times preempting or delaying CBS network shows for the live broadcasts), before the A's broadcasts moved to then-NBC affiliate KRON-TV in the early 1990s; select A's and San Francisco Giants games were aired on KPIX from 1990 to 1993 as part of CBS' MLB broadcast contract (including the A's appearance in the 1990 World Series). KPIX was also the television home of the Golden State Warriors basketball team during the 1990s. KPIX-TV was also the exclusive home of the Bay to Breakers, before it moved to KRON.

From 1956 to 1993, KPIX carried most San Francisco 49ers games locally as part of CBS' broadcast rights to the NFL, which covered the entire pre-merger league until 1970, and the National Football Conference from 1970 to 1993. Two of the 49ers' Super Bowl victories aired locally on KPIX: Super Bowl XVI and Super Bowl XXIV, as well as their appearances in Super Bowls XLVII and LVIII. The station also provided local coverage of Super Bowl 50, which was played at Levi's Stadium.

In 1994, CBS was outbid for television rights by Fox, and most Sunday 49ers games have been broadcast by KTVU (channel 2) since. Beginning in 1998, the NFL on CBS returned to KPIX, originally with the American Football Conference Sunday package. This included most locally televised Raiders games and the occasional 49ers game. Since 2014, the NFL can schedule Sunday day games on either CBS (KPIX) or Fox (KTVU) regardless of conference.

KPIX has a long-time local broadcast partnership with the 49ers for preseason games which are not nationally televised. KPIX also locally broadcasts some 49er games which are on pay television, including ESPN's Monday Night Football or streaming services.

In 2025, KPIX announced an agreement with the Golden State Valkyries of the WNBA, in its inaugural season, to become the teams first broadcast partner. Games are shared between KPIX and KPYX, in addition to nationally televised games on CBS.

=== Captain Fortune ===
During the 1950s, KPIX produced a local children's program, Captain Fortune, on weekday afternoons and Saturday mornings. In addition to a number of live segments with an in-studio children's audience, the program featured the animated television episodes of Crusader Rabbit. Brother Buzz, a feature from the Latham Foundation (an Oakland-based organization dedicated to the concept of humane education), with marionettes created and operated by Ralph Chessé and company, were a weekly segment starting in 1952 (and later became its own separate, stand-alone program which ran for several more years on KPIX and KGO). The "captain" sometimes drew pictures to illustrate his stories. He had another segment called "wiggly lines", where he would ask a child to draw a wiggly line and ask him or her what they wanted Captain Fortune to draw and he would convert the line into the drawing. Captain Fortune was actually a talented artist named Peter Abenheim. Abenheim authored a book, published in 1959 by Nourse Publishing of San Carlos, California, Captain Impossible at Sea. Abenheim wrote the screenplay for a 1962 science fiction film, This Is Not a Test (also released as Atomic War Bride). He was born in England on January 26, 1912. He came to San Francisco in 1932 and attended the California School of Fine Arts. He worked as an educational filmmaker. He died in San Francisco on May 2, 1988.

=== Dick Stewart ===
From 1956 to 1959, Davenport, Iowa, native Dick Stewart (born 1927) hosted a weekday variety program at KPIX. Due to the popularity of the film Gidget in 1959, the station decided to run a "Miss Gidget" contest on Dick Stewart's television program. The contest was won by Barbara Bouchet, who would become one of the "Regulars" on his later program Dance Party. She would later go on to be a famous star in her own right.

From 1959 to 1963, Stewart hosted Dance Party for KPIX, a program that invited local teenagers to come and dance to recorded music in the KPIX studios. Besides playing current recordings, Stewart sometimes welcomed popular recording stars to the program. Following the custom of American Bandstand, the singers would lip-sync to their recordings. Stewart also hosted a number of High School Salute programs on Saturdays that spotlighted area high schools with interviews with students and faculty, as well as filmed segments from each school.

=== News operation ===
KPIX-TV presently broadcasts 27 hours of locally produced newscasts each week (with four hours, five minutes each weekday; three hours, 35 minutes on Saturdays; and three hours on Sundays). For most of the last 30 years, KPIX has been a runner-up to KGO-TV in the Bay Area news ratings. KPIX uses a doppler weather radar system called "Hi-Def Doppler" during weather segments, which is located on Mount Vaca.

As the Bay Area's first television station, KPIX was a pioneer in local television news coverage in the region. Like most television stations, it presented a 15-minute evening news program until 1963, when the networks began expanding their evening newscasts to 30 minutes. One of KPIX's innovating program directors, Ray Hubbard, created The Noon News. The anchors were John Weston, "Channel 5's Guy on the Go", and Wanda Ramey (one of the first female news anchors on U.S. television), "Channel 5's Gal on the Go". From 1965 to 1994 and again from 1995 to 2013, KPIX used the Eyewitness News format originally adopted by Philadelphia sister station KYW-TV. KGO-TV also uses a similar format for its newscasts, but KPIX had the Eyewitness News name first; KGO adopted its version of the format from its New York City sister station WABC-TV. In 1966, KPIX hired the first African-American news reporters in the San Francisco television market: Ben Williams, who had been the first Black reporter for the San Francisco Examiner a few years earlier, and Belva Davis, the first female African-American reporter on the West Coast.

In February 1992, the station moved its 11 p.m. newscast to 10 p.m. and expanded the program to one hour, as part of KPIX's early prime time programming experiment which moved CBS's prime time lineup one hour early. Then-NBC affiliate KRON-TV also experimented with a 7-10 p.m. prime time block and ran a newscast at 10 p.m. during this time, but for most of that period, its newscast ran for only a half-hour. Under pressure from NBC, KRON switched back to the standard 8-11 p.m. prime time scheduling after only a year; KPIX did not revert to the standard Pacific Time Zone prime time scheduling until 1998, after failing to make a dent in the ratings for long-dominant KTVU's 10 p.m. newscast.

KPIX was also home to 30 Minutes Bay Area, a half-hour news magazine produced in consultation with 60 Minutes creator Don Hewitt after he retired from the national show. The "30 Minutes" concept was originally planned to air on many CBS-owned stations, but KPIX was the only station to implement the concept. 30 Minutes Bay Area was discontinued in early 2007. KPIX also was one of the first U.S. television stations to provide full-time environment reporting in its newscasts—"The Greenbeat" ran from 2007 to 2010, and featured reports by Jeffrey Schaub on environmental sustainability, green technology and earth awareness issues.

In 2007, Wendy Tokuda (who co-anchored channel 5's evening newscasts from 1978 to 1991), returned to KPIX and brought it "Students Rising Above" feature reports that she originated during her nine-year tenure with KRON-TV to the station; Tokuda founded the "Students Rising Above" student scholarship program in 1998. On January 28, 2008, KPIX became the third Bay Area television station to begin broadcasting its local newscasts in high definition (behind KGO-TV and KTVU); most field reports were initially still broadcast in 4:3 standard definition (albeit pillarboxed); KPIX started using HD cameras for its field reports in September 2010; however, not all of the station's news footage is shot in HD.

In September 2010, KPIX introduced new graphics for its newscasts, a standardized package that was also rolled out to CBS's other news-producing O&O stations; this included the addition of "The Enforcer" music package by Gari Media Group, the basic theme of which has been used on many CBS-owned stations since the mid-1970s, when it was introduced by WBBM-TV. In January 2011, KPIX expanded its weekday morning newscast by a half-hour to 4:30 am. On January 8, 2012, KPIX began producing a Sunday morning newscast for sister station KBCW.

On January 14, 2019, KPIX moved the half-hour CBS Evening News from 5:30 p.m. to 6:30 p.m. The 5 p.m. local newscast was expanded to a full hour; the 6 p.m. local newscast was shortened to a half-hour. By early February 2019, a new half-hour local newscast was airing at 7 p.m.

KPIX launched a streaming news service, CBSN Bay Area (now CBS News Bay Area) on November 18, 2019, as part of a rollout of similar services (each of them localized versions of the national CBSN service) across the CBS-owned stations.

On September 27, 2021, KPIX launched a half-hour 3 p.m. newscast, followed by the live East Coast feed of the CBS Evening News. KPIX launched a one-hour newscast airing at 9 a.m. on September 12, 2022, with the second half-hour streaming on CBS News Bay Area. Since September 23, 2025, select KPIX newscasts have been simulcasting on Monterey CBS affiliate KION-TV after that station ceased its news operations after 56 years.

==== Notable former on-air staff ====
- Jim Avila – weekend anchor/San Jose Bureau chief (1976–1980)
- Ken Bastida – anchor (1990–2021)
- Renel Brooks-Moon – entertainment reporter (2003–2006)
- Christine Craft – anchor/reporter (1975–1977)
- David Cruz – anchor/reporter (1979)
- Veronica de la Cruz – anchor (2014–2021)
- Paul Deanno – chief meteorologist (2012–2019)
- Jami Floyd – legal analyst and reporter (1994–1997)
- Bob Fouts – sports anchor (1965–1968)
- Dan Fouts – sports anchor (1994–1997)
- Bambi Francisco – technology reporter (1999–2003)
- Wayne Freedman – reporter (1989–1991)
- Cynthia Gouw – reporter
- Harold Greene – anchor (1977)
- Bill Hillman – anchor/reporter (1953–1992)
- Jonathan Karsh – Evening Magazine host/contributor (1998–2001)
- Dana King – anchor (1997–2012)
- Ron Magers – anchor/reporter (1968–1974)
- Michael Marsh
- Dave McElhatton – anchor (1976–2000)
- Lee Mendelson – producer (1961–1963)
- Hank Plante – reporter, anchor and political editor (1985–2010)
- Wanda Ramey – co-anchor/reporter; first female anchor in Western U.S. (1957–1967)
- Trish Regan – reporter; fill-in Early Edition anchor (2002–2003)
- Mike Rowe – Evening Magazine co-host (2001–2005)
- Nancy Snyderman – medical reporter (1988–2004)
- Brian Sussman – meteorologist (1989–2000)
- Wendy Tokuda – co-anchor (1977–1991, 2007–2016)
- Kaity Tong – reporter (1976–1979)
- Thuy Vu – reporter (1994–1998)
- Wayne Walker – sports anchor (1974–1994)
- Colleen Williams – anchor/reporter (1981–1983)
- Jan Yanehiro – Evening Magazine co-host (1976–1990)

== Technical information ==
=== Subchannels ===
The station's signal is multiplexed:

Subchannels of KPIX-TV
Subchannel	Res.	Short name	Programming
5.1	1080i	KPIX-TV	CBS
5.2	480i	StartTV	Start TV
5.3	480i	Dabl	Dabl
5.4	480i	365BLK	365BLK
5.5	480i	COMET	Comet

=== Analog-to-digital conversion ===
KPIX-TV shut down its analog signal, over VHF channel 5, on June 12, 2009, as part of the federally mandated transition from analog to digital television. The station's digital signal remained on its pre-transition UHF channel 29, using virtual channel 5.

=== Translator ===
- K27EE-D Ukiah
