= Joanna Gleason =

Canadian actress (born 1950)

- Born: Joanne Hall; June 2, 1950 (age 76); Toronto, Ontario, Canada
- Education: University of California, Los Angeles; Occidental College
- Occupation: Actress
- Years active: 1972–present
- Spouses: Paul G. Gleason (m. 1975; div. 1982); Michael Bennahum (m. 1984; div. 1990); Chris Sarandon (m. 1994)
- Parents: Monty Hall (father); Marilyn Hall (mother)

Joanna Hall Gleason Sarandon (born June 2, 1950) is a Canadian actress, known for her performances in theatrical musicals and plays, and on film and television.

In theatre, Gleason originated the role of the Baker's Wife in Stephen Sondheim and James Lapine's Into the Woods on Broadway, for which she won the Tony Award for Best Leading Actress in a Musical and the Drama Desk Award for Outstanding Featured Actress in a Musical in 1988. She also received Tony nominations for her performances in A Day in the Death of Joe Egg (1985) and Dirty Rotten Scoundrels (2005). Her notable film appearances include supporting roles in Woody Allen's Hannah and Her Sisters (1986) and Crimes and Misdemeanors (1989), and Paul Thomas Anderson's Boogie Nights (1997). On television she has appeared in ER, Friends, The West Wing, The Good Wife and The Affair.

== Early life ==
Gleason is the daughter of Monty and Marilyn Hall. By the time of her birth, her father was working for Toronto radio stations and had changed his name from "Halparin" to "Hall". He later started a television career and went on to fame as host of Let's Make a Deal.

Hall graduated from Beverly Hills High School (BHHS) in 1968. She was in the school's productions of The Music Man, The Mikado, The Grass Harp, and The Madwoman of Chaillot. In high school, Gleason received acting instruction from John Ingle, later known as Edward Quartermaine on General Hospital, who taught at BHHS from 1955 to 1985. She continued her education at UCLA, then Occidental College, from which she graduated. Gleason has been a teacher herself, holding classes and workshops all over the country.

== Career ==
=== Theatre ===
Gleason made her professional debut in Promises, Promises in 1972. Five years later she debuted on Broadway, originating the role of Monica in Cy Coleman and Michael Stewart's I Love My Wife (1977), for which she was honored with a Theatre World Award.

Gleason returned to Broadway in 1984 to appear in Tom Stoppard's The Real Thing, as a replacement for the role of Charlotte originated by Christine Baranski. In 1985 she played Pam in a revival of Peter Nichols' A Day in the Death of Joe Egg, for which she was nominated for the Tony Award for Best Featured Actress in a Play and the Drama Desk Award for Outstanding Featured Actress in a Play. She won the Drama Desk Award in the same category the following year for her performances off-Broadway as Virginia in Terrence McNally's It's Only a Play and Trudy in Andrew Bergman's Social Security.

Gleason had her greatest success as the original Baker's Wife in Into the Woods by Stephen Sondheim and James Lapine, firstly at the Old Globe Theatre, San Diego in 1986, before transferring to Broadway the following year. The New York Times, although somewhat critical of the production, described her as "wonderful," and she won both the Tony Award for Best Leading Actress in a Musical (presented by her co-star Bernadette Peters) and the Drama Desk Award for Outstanding Featured Actress in a Musical. Her performance was captured on the original cast recording and in a filmed version broadcast on the PBS anthology series Great Performances.

In 1991 Gleason played the lead role of Nora Charles in Arthur Laurents, Charles Strouse and Richard Maltby Jr.'s Nick & Nora, a musical adaptation of The Thin Man that encountered numerous troubles in previews and closed after only nine performances. As Muriel in the musical adaptation of Dirty Rotten Scoundrels (2005), she was nominated for the Tony Award for Best Featured Actress in a Musical. The following year she played Titsiana in Douglas Carter Beane's The Cartells, a staged soap opera in which the New York Times deemed her "hilarious."

In 2007, Gleason was honored by the New England Theatre Conference with a Special Award for Achievement in Theatre.

=== Film and television ===
In 1979, Gleason was cast as supporting character Morgan in the television sitcom Hello, Larry starring McLean Stevenson; the series ran for two seasons but was poorly received. In the 1983 television movie Still the Beaver, she played Beaver's ex-wife Kimberly.

Gleason debuted on film in 1986, with roles in Woody Allen's Hannah and Her Sisters (as Carol) and Mike Nichols' Heartburn (as Diana). She worked with Allen again in Crimes and Misdemeanors (1989), playing Wendy, the wife of Allen's character. She has since appeared in numerous films including F/X2 (1991), Mr. Holland's Opus (1995), The Wedding Planner (2001), and Sex and the City (2004). She played the memorable role of Dirk's mother opposite Mark Wahlberg in Paul Thomas Anderson's Boogie Nights (1997).

On television, Gleason played the role of Nadine Berkus on the show Love & War (1992–95), several episodes of which she also directed, and Joan Silver on Temporarily Yours (1997). She starred in the Lifetime series Oh Baby as Charlotte from 1998 to 2000, also directing episodes of this show. Shortly following the end of this series, she starred opposite Bette Midler on Bette as agent Connie Randolph. She appeared in six episodes of the Canadian black comedy series Sensitive Skin as Veronica, from 2014 to 2016.

Gleason's numerous guest starring television credits include episodes of The West Wing, The Practice, King of the Hill, Friends, Password Plus, Tracey Takes On..., Murphy Brown, ER, The Outer Limits, The Good Wife, Blue Bloods and The Newsroom.

== Personal life ==
Gleason has been married three times. She was married to acting coach Paul G. Gleason. She kept his surname professionally, although they divorced on June 28, 1982. Later, she married Michael Bennahum.

Gleason has been married to actor Chris Sarandon since 1994. The two met while performing in Broadway's short-lived 1991 musical Nick & Nora, returned to the stage together in Thorn and Bloom (1998), and collaborated on several films, such as Road Ends, Edie & Pen, Let the Devil Wear Black, and American Perfekt.

Gleason's siblings are television writer/director Sharon Hall Kessler and Emmy award-winning television writer/director Richard Hall.

== Acting credits ==
=== Film ===
Year	Title	Role	Notes
1986	Hannah and Her Sisters	Carol	
1986	Heartburn	Diana	
1989	Crimes and Misdemeanors	Wendy Stern	
1991	F/X2	Liz Kennedy	
1995	Mr. Holland's Opus	Governor Gertrude Lang	
1996	Edie & Pen	Maudie	
1997	American Perfekt	Shirley	
1997	Boogie Nights	Dirk's Mother	
1997	Road Ends	Armacost	
1999	Let the Devil Wear Black	Dr. Rona Hackley	
2001	The Wedding Planner	Mrs. Donolly	
2006	Wedding Daze	Lois	
2007	The Girl in the Park	Sarah	
2008	Sex and the City	Therapist	
2008	My Sassy Girl	Kitty/Aunt Sally	
2008	The Women	Barbara	
2009	The Rebound	Roberta Finklestein	
2013	Last Vegas	Miriam Harris	
2014	The Skeleton Twins	Judy	

=== Television ===
Year	Title	Role	Notes
1979	Diff'rent Strokes	Morgan Winslow	3 episodes
1979–80	Hello, Larry	Morgan Winslow	37 episodes
1981	Bosom Buddies	Faith Crane	Episode: "What Price Glory?"
1982	Love, Sidney	Gail	Episode: "The Activist"
1983	The New Leave It to Beaver	Kimberly	Episode: "Still the Beaver"
1983	Great Day	Jennifer Simpson	Television movie
1991	Into the Woods	Baker's Wife	Televised Broadway performance
1991	The Boys	Marie	Television movie
1992	For Richer, for Poorer	Irene	Television movie
1992–95	Love & War	Nadine Berkus	67 episodes
1993	Born Too Soon	Annemarie	Television movie
1994	For the Love of Aaron	Shirley	Television movie
1996	The Outer Limits	Leslie	Episode: "Inconstant Moon"
1996	ER	Iris	3 episodes
1996	If These Walls Could Talk	Julia (segment: 1974)	Television movie
1996–98	Tracey Takes On...	Katherine Hawkins; LeAnne the Stewardess	2 episodes
1997	Adventures from the Book of Virtues	Delia Young	Voice; Episode: "Generosity"
1997	Temporarily Yours	Joan Silver	6 episodes
1997	Perversions of Science	Mrs. Rabe	Episode: "Anatomy Lesson"
1997	Murphy Brown	Athena Gillington	Episode: "Petty Woman"
1997–2004	King of the Hill	Various Roles	Voice; 8 episodes
1998	George and Leo	Teacher	Episode: "The Teacher"
1999	Friends	Kim Clozzi	2 episodes
1998–2000	Oh Baby	Charlotte St. John	28 episodes
2000–01	Bette	Connie Randolph	18 episodes
2001	The Practice	Henrietta Lightstone	2 episodes
2001–02	The West Wing	Jordon Kendall	5 episodes
2005	Fathers and Sons	Silvia	Television movie
2009–12	The Good Wife	Judge Carmella Romano	3 episodes
2010	How to Make It in America	Ben's Mother	Episode: "Paper, Denim + Dollars"
2010	Delocated	Dr. Mitchell	Episode: Conversions
2011	Royal Pains	Evelyn Woodward	Episode: Rash Talk
2013	Blue Bloods	Grace Newhouse	2 episodes
2014	The Newsroom	Nancy Skinner	Episode: "What Kind of Day Has It Been"
2014–16	Sensitive Skin	Veronica	6 episodes
2015	The Affair	Yvonne	3 episodes
2019	Unbreakable Kimmy Schmidt	Janice Hoffman	Episode: "Kimmy is in a Love Square!"
2021	The Bite	Veruca Dumont	3 episodes
2022	The Good Fight	Judge Carmella Romano	1 episode
2026	Elsbeth	Maura Davidoff	season 3 episode 16 "Murder, He Wrote"

=== Theatre ===
Year	Title	Role	Theatre	Notes
1972	Fiddler on the Roof	Tzeitel	Long Beach Civic Light Opera, Regional	
1974	Hamlet	Ophelia	Mark Taper Forum, Regional	Understudy
1975	All My Sons	Ann Deever	Huntington Hartford Theatre, Regional	
1975	How to Succeed in Business Without Really Trying	Rosemary	Long Beach Civic Light Opera, Regional	Understudy
1977–78	I Love My Wife	Monica	Ethel Barrymore Theatre, Broadway	
1980	On a Clear Day You Can See Forever	Daisy Gamble/Melinda	Regional Tour	
1984	A Hell of a Town	n/a	Westside Theatre, Off-Broadway	
1984	The Real Thing	Charlotte	Plymouth Theatre, Broadway	Replacement
1985	A Day in the Death of Joe Egg	Pam	Haft Theater, Off-Broadway	
1985	A Day in the Death of Joe Egg	Pam	Longacre Theatre, Broadway	
1985–86	It's Only a Play	Virginia Noyles	New York City Center Stage I, Off-Broadway	
1986	Social Security	Trudy Heyman	Ethel Barrymore Theatre, Broadway	
1986–87	Into the Woods	The Baker's Wife	Old Globe Theatre, Regional	
1987–88	Into the Woods	The Baker's Wife	Martin Beck Theatre, Broadway	
1989	Into the Woods	The Baker's Wife	Martin Beck Theatre, Broadway	
1989	Eleemosynary	Artie	New York City Center Stage II, Off-Broadway	
1991	Nick & Nora	Nora Charles	Marquis Theatre, Broadway	
1997	Into the Woods	The Baker’s Wife	Broadway Theatre, Broadway	10th Anniversary Concert
2004	The Normal Heart	Dr. Emma Brookner	Anspacher Theater, Off-Broadway	
2004	Dirty Rotten Scoundrels	Muriel Eubanks	Old Globe Theatre, Regional	
2005–06	Dirty Rotten Scoundrels	Muriel Eubanks	Imperial Theatre, Broadway	
2008	Something You Did	Alison	59E59 Theaters, Off-Broadway	
2009	Happiness	Arlene	Mitzi E. Newhouse Theater, Off-Broadway	
2010	Into the Woods	The Giant's Wife	Diablo Theatre Company, Regional	Pre-recorded voiceover
2011	Sons of the Prophet	Gloria	Huntington Theatre Company, Regional	
2011–12	Sons of the Prophet	Gloria	Laura Pels Theatre, Off-Broadway	
2022	Anyone Can Whistle	Narrator	Carnegie Hall	Concert
2022	Into the Woods	The Giant's Wife	Big Noise Theatre Company, Regional	Pre-recorded voiceover
2025	We Had a World	Renee	Manhattan Theatre Club	

== Awards and nominations ==
Year	Award	Category	Project	Result
1985	Tony Award	Best Featured Actress in a Play	A Day in the Death of Joe Egg	Nominated
1988	Tony Award	Best Leading Actress in a Musical	Into the Woods	Won
2005	Tony Award	Best Featured Actress in a Musical	Dirty Rotten Scoundrels	Nominated
1985	Drama Desk Award	Outstanding Featured Actress in a Play	Joe Egg	Nominated
1986	Drama Desk Award	Outstanding Featured Actress in a Play	It's Only a Play	Won
1986	Drama Desk Award	Outstanding Featured Actress in a Play	Social Security	Won
1988	Drama Desk Award	Outstanding Featured Actress in a Musical	Into the Woods	Won
2005	Drama Desk Award	Outstanding Featured Actress in a Musical	Dirty Rotten Scoundrels	Nominated
1988	Outer Critics Circle Awards	Outstanding Actress in a Musical	Into the Woods	Won
2005	Outer Critics Circle Awards	Outstanding Featured Actress in a Musical	Dirty Rotten Scoundrels	Nominated
2012	Outer Critics Circle Awards	Outstanding Featured Actress in a Play	Sons of the Prophet	Nominated
1977	Theatre World Award	—N/a	I Love My Wife	Won
