= Love in the Library =

2022 children's book

- Cover of Love in the Library
- Author: Maggie Tokuda-Hall
- Illustrator: Yas Imamura
- Language: English
- Genre: Children's literature
- Publisher: Candlewick Press
- Publication date: February 2022
- Publication place: United States
- Media type: Print (Hardcover)
- Pages: 40
- ISBN: 9781536204308
- OCLC: 1246145212
- LC Class: PZ7.1.T6225 Lo 2022

Love in the Library is a 2022 children's book written by Maggie Tokuda-Hall and illustrated by Yas Imamura. It is a children's historical fiction picture book intended for children aged six to nine years.

The book takes places in Minidoka, a War Relocation Center for Japanese Americans during World War II, and follows Tama, who enjoys working in the camp's library. There, she meets George, a patron who arrives at the library every morning with arms full of borrowed books. As time passes and they develop a strong friendship, Tama wonders whether George comes to the library for the books or for her. The book is based on the true story of how Tokuda-Hall's grandparents met, which she discusses in an afterword with a photo of her grandparents.

== Background ==
The story is based on Tokuda-Hall's real-life maternal grandparents, who met, married and started their family during the time they were imprisoned at Minidoka.

Minidoka War Relocation Center was an internment camp located in the Magic Valley region of Jerome, Idaho that operated from 1942 to 1945. It was one of ten camps established under President Franklin D. Roosevelt's Executive Order 9066 that interned people of Japanese ancestry from the West Coast during World War II. The camp housed 9,397 Japanese Americans at its peak. Today the camp is a National Historic Site operated by the National Park Service.

== Plot summary ==
Love in the Library opens with Tama walking past a guard tower to her job at the library in Minidoka. George, another prisoner at the camp, is waiting so he can check out more books. Their friendship grows amid the camp's crowded, uncomfortable, and unjust conditions. Tama enjoys working at the library, though she experiences sadness and confusion about her life at Minidoka. She continues to find solace in the pages of the books she reads and in her friendship with George. George comes to the library everyday, and he and Tama fall in love. Despite the injustices they face, Tama and George marry and have their first child in Minidoka. Tama describes her understanding that love is a gift in a place built on inhumanity. The story ends with her realization that "the miracle is in us" and humanity's ability to find beauty and hope in the world, even in difficult circumstances.

Tokuda-Hall included an author's note at the end of the book, revealing that the phrase "the miracle is in us" was taken from her grandmother Tama's real-life journal. The note also provides more context about Minidoka and Tokuda-Hall's inspiration for writing a story about "improbable joy" even as racism towards Asian Americans and other marginalized groups continues.

== Critical reception ==
Love in the Library received starred reviews from Booklist, Publishers Weekly, and School Library Journal.

Booklist's Van McGary praised Love in the Library for its depiction of "he resilience of Human dignity and optimism even during times of immense challenge and adversity." McGary wrote, "The author's gentle text captures the resilience of human dignity and optimism even during times of immense challenge and adversity. Imamura's stunning gouache and watercolor illustrations convey both the setting and the emotions of the characters." McGary specifically noted that the Author's Note "caps off this powerful must-read."

Publishers Weekly wrote, "Alongside a sensitive introduction to life in Japanese internment camps, this picture book transcends its central romance to encompass love for books, community, and being 'human.'" They further highlighted how Imamura's "fluid, dynamic gouache and watercolor illustrations [...] spotlight the expressive internees' individualism amid a bleak landscape, immersing readers via era-specific wardrobes and hues."

School Library Journal's Shannon O'Connor called the book "lovely" and "inspiring," highlighting how "Imamura's muted art, cushion[s] the harsh reality of how Japanese Americans were treated during World War II" and the message that "love is a miracle and can grow in the most unlikely of places." She also noted, "Young readers may find it hard to relate to the love story of two 20-somethings, finding it easier to connect with this subject matter by reading a story that centers on a child's experience or a beloved sport."

Kirkus Reviews called the book "an evocative and empowering tribute to human dignity and optimism."

Discussing the artwork, Shelf Awareness's Hong wrote, "Imamura favors browns and greens to capture the bleak desert landscapes but includes touching details that inspire and uplift: a beloved book held tight, clasped hands, children at play, tin-can-potted blooming flowers. Most extraordinary is the breadth of Imamura's expressions."

In 2022, School Library Journal, Booklist, and Publishers Weekly included Love in the Library on their lists of the year's best picture books. Booklist also included it on their "Top 10 Historical Fiction for Youth" list, and it was a 2023 Association for Library Service to Children Notable Children's Book.

== Controversy ==
In April 2023, Scholastic's Education division proposed obtaining the rights to publish the picture book for inclusion in a collection called Amplifying AANHPI (Asian Americans and Native Hawaiians/Pacific Islanders). The collection is part of the Rising Voices Library, which curates books along with teaching materials for educators, aiming to offer students engaging texts that highlight the narratives of historically marginalized groups. To be included in the library, Scholastic requested Tokuda-Hall remove the phrase "virulent racism" from a sentence discussing the traumatic impact of anti-Japanese American policies and to delete a paragraph addressing the broader historical repercussions of racism in America, which reads

As much as I would hope this would be a story of a distant past, it is not. It's very much the story of America here and now. The racism that put my grandparents into Minidoka is the same hate that keeps children in cages on our border. It's the myth of white supremacy that brought slavery to our past and allows the police to murder Black people in our present. It's the same fear that brings Muslim bans. It's the same contempt that creates voter suppression, medical apartheid, and food deserts. The same cruelty that carved reservations out of stolen, sovereign land, that paved the Trail of Tears. Hate is not a virus; it is an American tradition.

Scholastic indicated they "love this book" and "want everyone in the schools [they] serve to read it." However, they were concerned elementary teachers may decide not to use the book due to the strong language in the Author's Note. Responding to the request, Tokuda-Hall's editor at Candlewick stated, "We asked Maggie to provide the note. Maggie's powerful words offer vital historical context that will benefit younger and older readers alike, also drawing valuable connections between the events of the story and lessons for today."

Tokuda-Hall referred to the situation as "he perfect encapsulation of what publishing, our dubious white ally, does so often to marginalized creators. [...] Always, our voices are the first sacrifice at the altar of marketability." She ultimately declined the opportunity to be included in the Rising Voices Library, refusing to alter her book and the messaging it provides.

In response to the event, hundreds of authors signed petitions for Scholastic to include her book in the Rising Voices Library without altering the text. Additionally, the African American Policy Forum chose to include Love in the Library in their Freedom to Learn National Day of Action. The CEO of the Japanese American National Museum stated that omitting parts of history "at a certain point, becomes not truthful. [...] If we take out the racism part of it, or if we take out the part where we link it to present-day events, then it's really the most important part that we are removing."

Scholastic later apologized and requested a meeting with Tokuda-Hall to discuss publishing her book without redactions. Tokuda-Hall declined and stated in an interview with Rafu Shimpo that she "didn't believe they were doing well enough by her community… to have the right to her family's story" and that she did not trust them with it.

Beyond the response from Scholastic, Tokuda-Hall has stated she received many hate messages, as well as emails against the promotion of diversity, equity, and inclusion initiatives.
