= Cold Tofu =

American improv comedy group

Cold Tofu, also known as Cold Tofu Improv, is a non-profit organization and Asian American improvisation and comedy group based in Los Angeles. Founded in 1981, it is the first and longest running Asian American improvisation and comedy troupe in the United States.

== History ==
Cold Tofu was founded in 1981 by Denice Kumagai, Marilyn Tokuda, Irma Escamilla, and Judy Momii. The four friends were sitting in Kumagai’s living room laughing at one another’s stories, and Tokuda suggested forming a comedy group. For its 35th anniversary, Cold Tofu was featured in American Theatre magazine's list of "theatrical milestones". Though reputedly an Asian American comedy group, Cold Tofu's roots are multi-cultural. Early members included Amy Hill, Phil LaMarr, Jim MacNerland, Jerry Tondo, Geoff Rivas, Joey Miyashima, Glen Chin and Robert Covarrubias.

In its early years, the group trained with Stephen Book (founder of Improvisational Acting Technique and a co-worker of Viola Spolin), Gary Austin (creator of The Groundlings) and Andy Goldberg (director of Off The Wall at The Improv). Pat Morita was one of Cold Tofu's first sponsors. During the 1980s, Cold Tofu produced comedy shows that tackled issues of race, diversity and inclusion. Cold Tofu expanded its efforts in the late 1990s to service the community by providing improv workshops where actors and non-actors explored improv techniques to enhance performance and interpersonal skills.

Marilyn Tokuda and Denice Kumagai led Cold Tofu and shared the role of artistic director. In 1993, Robert Covarrubias and Helen Ota took over as co-artistic directors and served the organization until 2000, when Ota continued as the sole artistic director. In 2013, Jully Lee was appointed to the position.

== Operations ==
Cold Tofu's performing cast performs improv shows regularly in Little Tokyo and throughout Los Angeles. Cold Tofu also continues to provides student workshops through its Training Center for actors and non-actors.

== Awards ==
- "Heritage Award" - Aquarium of the Pacific (2014)
- "Excellence in Community Service Award" - Asian Professional Exchange (APEX) (2014)
- "Visionary Award" - East West Players (2013)
- "Parade Marshal of Grand Parade" - Nisei Week Festival (2013)
- "Sen. Daniel Inouye Leadership Award" - Southern California Cherry Blossom Festival (2008)
- "Community Service Award" - Nisei Week Festival (2005)
