= Wendy Tokuda =

American television journalist

Wendy Tokuda is an American television journalist.

== Biography ==
Tokuda was a reporter and anchor for KING-TV in Seattle, Washington from 1974 to 1977, then went on to KPIX in San Francisco as reporter and co-anchor for the station's evening newscasts with Dave McElhatton for 14 years. She wrote two children's books with her husband, TV producer Richard Hall.

In 1991, Tokuda joined KNBC in Los Angeles as reporter and weekend anchor alongside Bill Lagattuta, then with Rick Chambers. The following year, she moved to weekdays at 5 p.m. and 11 p.m. alongside Paul Moyer, who had rejoined KNBC after 13 years at KABC-TV. However, after a few months. Tokuda left both newscasts and was reassigned to the 6 p.m. news with Jess Marlow. In 1997, Tokuda returned to San Francisco and became co-anchor for the 4 p.m. newscast on KRON-TV with Pam Moore.

Tokuda left KRON-TV and returned to KPIX in 2007. She then took on special projects, such as "Students Rising Above", a program profiling low-income high school students who want to go to college.

She retired on August 19, 2016.

Tokuda's daughter is American novelist and children's book writer Maggie Tokuda-Hall. Tokuda's brother was Washington State Representative Kip Tokuda.

== Books ==
- (with Richard Hall) Humphrey the Lost Whale: A True Story. Heian Intl Pub Co, 1986. Illustrated by Hanako Wakiyama. ISBN 978-0893462703
- (with Richard Hall) Shiro in Love: A True Story. 1989. Illustrated by Karen Okasaki Sasaki. ISBN 978-0893463069
- Sampson the Hot Tub Bear: A True Story. Roberts Rinehart Publishers, 1998. Illustrated by Lokken Millis. ISBN 978-1570980909
