= History of Seattle =

This is the main article of a series that covers the history of Seattle, Washington, a city in the Pacific Northwest region of the United States of America.

Seattle is a major port city that has a history of boom and bust. Seattle has on several occasions been sent into severe decline, but has typically used those periods to successfully rebuild infrastructure. There have been at least five such cycles:

- The lumber-industry boom, followed by the construction of an Olmsted-designed park system.
- The Klondike gold rush started in 1896, but reached Seattle in July 1897. This constituted the largest boom for Seattle proportional to the city's size at the time, and ended the economic woes Seattle (and the nation) had been suffering since the Panic of 1893.
- The shipbuilding boom, which peaked during World War I and crashed immediately thereafter, followed by the unused city development plan of Virgil Bogue.
- The Boeing boom, followed by general infrastructure building.
- Most recently, the boom based on Microsoft and other software, web, and telecommunications companies, such as Amazon, AT&T Wireless, and RealNetworks.

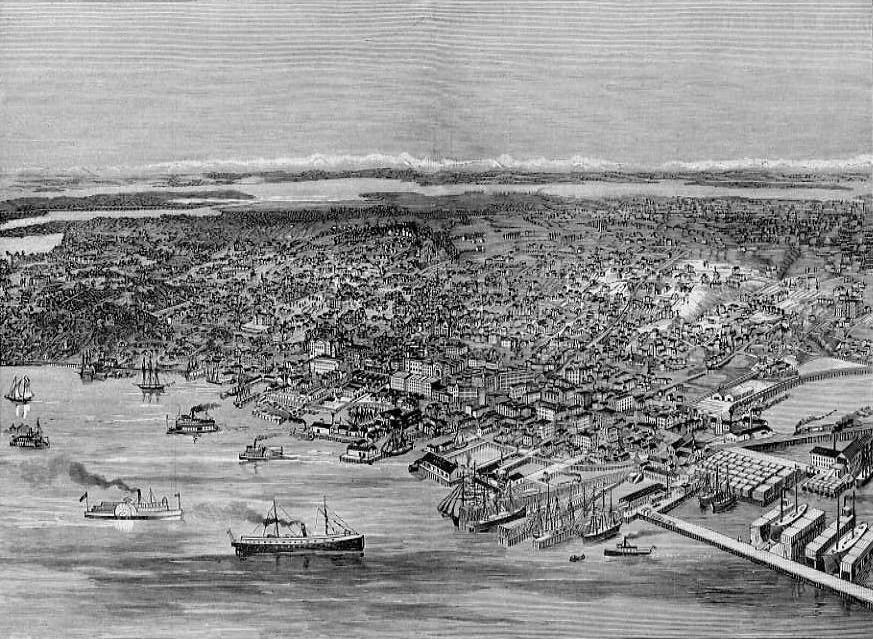
Bird's-eye view of Seattle in 1889

== Early history of Seattle ==
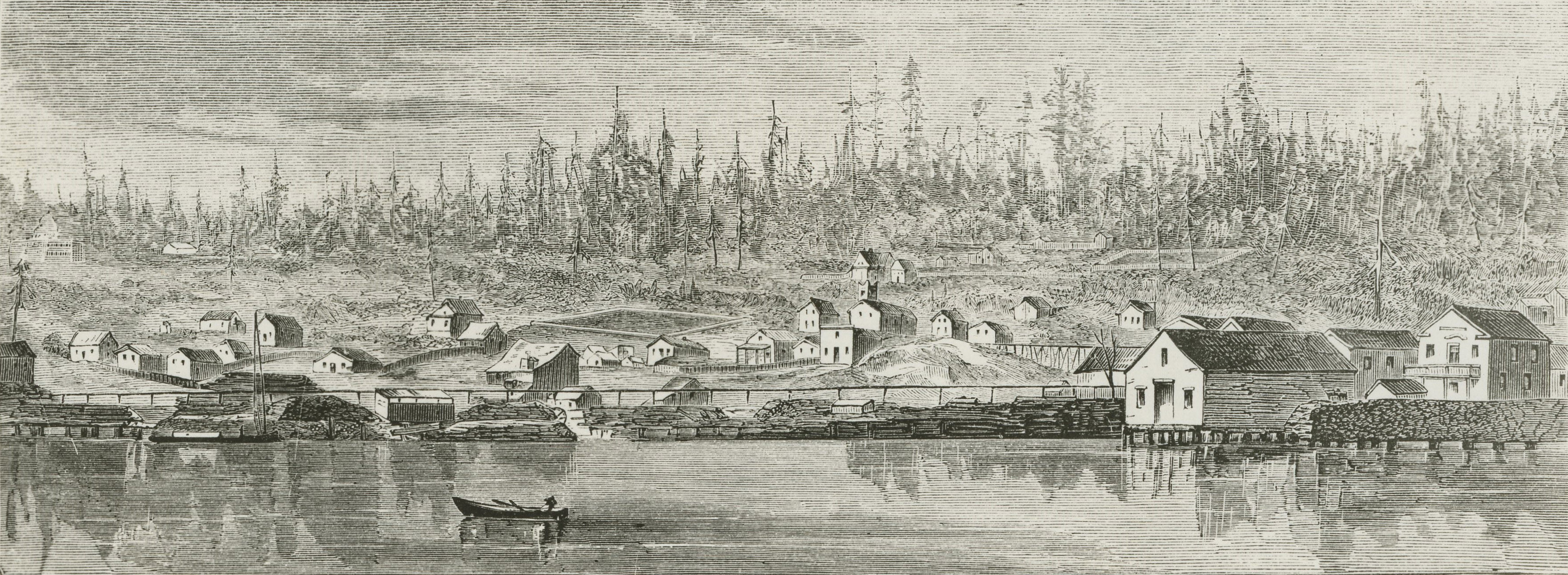
Seattle, engraving from Harper's New Monthly Magazine (September 1870)

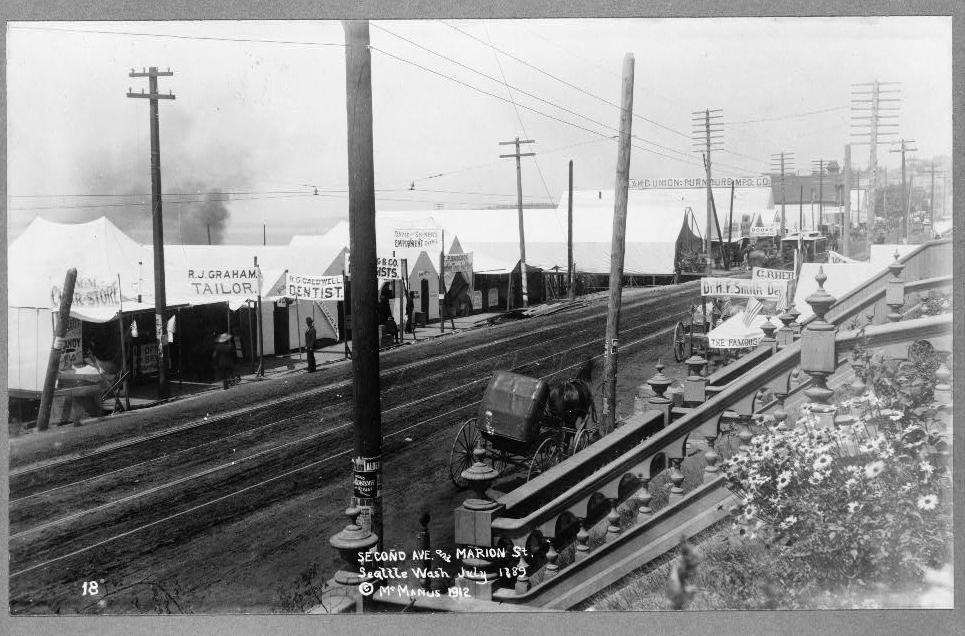
Second Ave. and Marion St., Seattle, Wash., July 1889

What is now Seattle has been inhabited since the end of the last glacial period (c. 8,000 B.C.—10,000 years ago), for at least 4,000 years. In the mid-1850s the Coast Salish people of what is now called the Duwamish Tribe and Suquamish, as well as other associated groups and tribes, were living in some 13 villages within the present-day city limits of Seattle. Evidence of continuous human habitation of a village site within the current city limits of the city of Seattle dating back to the 6th century C.E. exists on the Port of Seattle Terminal 107 site, located on the Western bank of the Duwamish River. The site was abandoned in approximately 1800, for unknown reasons. Other notable village sites include the birthplace of Chief Seattle, which was located near the current footprint of the King Street Station.

George Vancouver was the first European to visit the Seattle area in May 1792 during his 1791-95 expedition to chart the Pacific Northwest.

The founding of Seattle is usually dated from the arrival of the Denny Party scouts on September 25, 1851. However, Luther Collins, Henry Van Asselt, and the Maple family founded a farming settlement on what is currently the Seattle neighborhood of Georgetown on September 27, 1851. The Denny party's original site was an unfinished cabin, without roof, and a camp site, located at Alki Point, in West Seattle. The Collins party settlement was improved with permanent structures, and was soon producing produce and meat for sale and barter. In April, 1852, Arthur A. Denny abandoned the original site at Alki in favor of a better protected site on Elliott Bay that is now part of downtown Seattle. Arthur A. Denny and Luther Collins were the first commissioners of King County after its creation in 1852. Around the same time, David Swinson "Doc" Maynard began settling the land immediately south of Denny's.

Seattle in its early decades relied on the timber industry, shipping logs (and later, milled timber) to San Francisco. A climax forest of trees up to 1,000–2,000 years old and towering as high as nearly 400 ft (122 m) covered much of what is now Seattle. Today, none of that size remain anywhere in the world.

When Henry Yesler brought the first steam sawmill to the region, he chose a location on the waterfront where Maynard and Denny's plats met. Thereafter Seattle would dominate the lumber industry.

Charlie Terry sold out Alki (which, after his departure barely held on as a settlement), moved to Seattle and began acquiring land. He either owned or partially owned Seattle's first timber ships. He eventually gave a land grant to the University of the Territory of Washington (later University of Washington), and was instrumental in the politics to establish an urban infrastructure.

The logging town developed rapidly over decades into a small city. Despite being officially founded by the Methodists of the Denny Party, Seattle quickly developed a reputation as a wide-open town, a haven for prostitution, liquor, and gambling. Some attribute this, at least in part, to Maynard who realized that something was needed to bring the loggers and sailors, who formed the majority of the surrounding population, to town.

Real estate records show that nearly all of the city's first 60 businesses were on, or immediately adjacent to, Maynard's plat.

All of this occurred against a background of sometimes rocky relations with the local Native American population, including a nominally pitched battle, the Battle of Seattle, January 25, 1856.

Seattle was incorporated as a town January 14, 1865. That charter was voided January 18, 1867, in response to questionable activities of the town's elected leaders. Seattle was re-incorporated December 2, 1869. At the times of incorporations, the population was approximately 350 and 1,000, respectively.

In 1867, a young French Canadian Catholic priest named Francis X. Prefontaine arrived in Seattle and decided to establish a parish there. At that time, Seattle had no Catholic church and few parishioners. Fr. Prefontaine counted only ten Catholics in the town and only three attended the first mass that he conducted. His bishop, Augustin-Magloire Blanchet, whose cathedra was in Vancouver, Washington, gave Fr. Prefontaine permission to build a church there, as long as the priest could raise the funds himself and it would cost the diocese nothing. Prefontaine raised the money by holding fairs around the Puget Sound area. During 1868–69 he built the church, doing much of the work himself, and in 1869 he opened Seattle's first Catholic church at Third Avenue and Washington Street, on the site where the present-day Prefontaine Building stands.47°36′05″N 122°19′46″W

=== Railroad rivalry and encroaching civilization ===
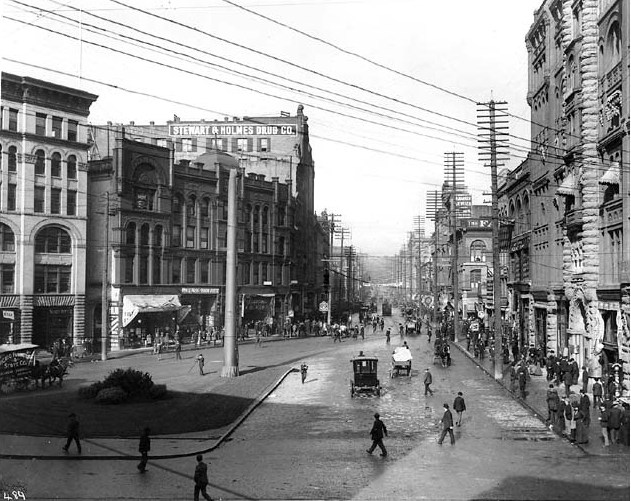
Looking up 1st Ave. from Pioneer Square, 1900

On July 14, 1873, the Northern Pacific Railway announced that they had chosen the then-village of Tacoma over Seattle as the Western terminus of their transcontinental railroad. The railroad barons appear to have been gambling on the advantage they could gain from being able to buy up the land around their terminus cheaply instead of bringing the railroad into a more established Pacific port town.

Seattle made several attempts to build a railroad of its own or to leverage one to come. The Great Northern Railway finally came to Seattle in 1884, winning Seattle a place in competition for freight, though it would be 1906 before Seattle finally acquired a major rail passenger terminal.

Seattle in this era was a freebooting and often relatively lawless town. Although it boasted newspapers and telephones, lynch law often prevailed (there were at least three deaths by lynching in 1882), schools barely operated, and indoor plumbing was a rare novelty. In the low mudflats where much of the city was built, sewage was almost as likely to come in on the tide as to flow away.

Union organizing first arrived in the form of a skilled craft union. In 1882, Seattle printers formed the Seattle Typographical Union Local 202. Dockworkers followed in 1886, cigarmakers in 1887, tailors in 1889, and both brewers and musicians in 1890. Even the newsboys unionized in 1892, followed by more organizing, mostly of craft unions.

The history of labor in the American West in this period is inseparable from the issue of anti-Chinese vigilantism. In 1883 Chinese laborers played a key role in the first effort at digging the Montlake Cut to connect Lake Union's Portage Bay to Lake Washington's Union Bay. In 1885–1886, whites—sometimes in combination with Indians—complaining of overly cheap labor competition, drove the Chinese settlers from Seattle, Tacoma, and other Northwest cities.

In an era during which the Washington Territory was one of the first parts of the U.S. to (briefly) allow women's suffrage, women played a significant part in "civilizing" Seattle.

The first bathtub with plumbing was in 1870. In the 1880s, Seattle got its first streetcar and cable car, ferry service, a YMCA gymnasium, and the exclusive Rainier Club, and passed an ordinance requiring attached sewer lines for all new residences. It also began to develop a road system.

The relative fortunes of Seattle and Tacoma clearly show the nature of Seattle's growth. Though both Seattle and Tacoma grew at a rapid rate from 1880 to 1890, based on the strength of their timber industries, Seattle's growth as an exporter of services and manufactured goods continued for another two decades, while Tacoma's growth dropped almost to zero. The reason for this lies in Tacoma's nature as a company town and Seattle's successful avoidance of that condition.

=== The Great Fire ===
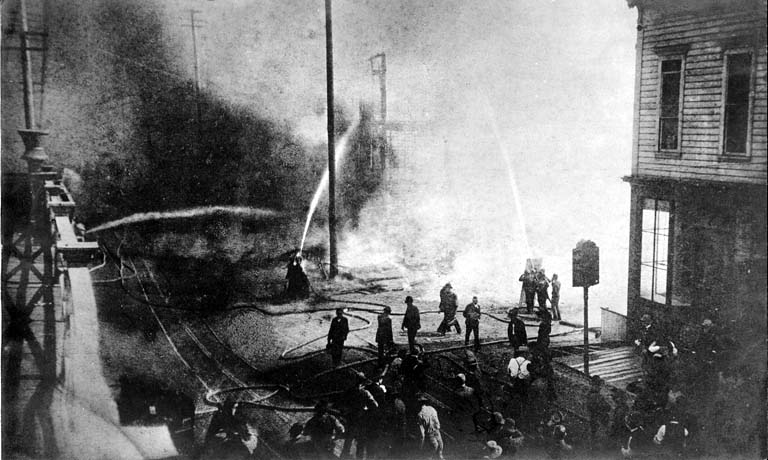
Start of the Great Seattle Fire, looking south on 1st Avenue near Madison Street

The early Seattle era came to a stunning halt with the Great Seattle Fire of June 6, 1889. Started by a glue pot, the fire burned 29 city blocks (almost entirely wooden buildings; about 10 brick buildings also burned). It destroyed nearly the entire business district, all of the railroad terminals, and all but four of the wharves. Major fires like this were common in Washington that summer: the center of Ellensburg was destroyed by fire on July 4 and downtown Spokane burned on August 4.

Thanks in part to credit arranged by Jacob Furth, Seattle rebuilt from the ashes with astounding rapidity. A new zoning code resulted in a downtown of brick and stone buildings, rather than wood. In the single year after the fire, the city grew from 25,000 to 40,000 inhabitants, largely because of the enormous number of construction jobs suddenly created.

Still, south of Yesler Way, the open city atmosphere remained.

=== The Klondike Gold Rush ===
The greatest boom period for Seattle occurred during the Klondike gold rush. Seattle, as well as the rest of the nation, was suffering from the economic panic of 1893, and to a lesser extent, the panic of 1896. Gold was discovered in August 1896 in the Klondike region of Canada. Almost one year later, on July 17, 1897, the steamer Portland arrived at Schwabacher's Wharf in Seattle. A publicity campaign engineered largely by Erastus Brainerd told the world of the Portland's "ton of gold," started the Klondike gold rush, and established Seattle as its supply center and the jumping-off point for transportation to and from Alaska and the gold fields of the Yukon. The rush ended the depression overnight for Seattle.

== Beginning of the 20th century ==
=== Leader of the Northwest: 1900–1915 ===
A corner of Seattle's Public Market in 1909

The gold rush led to massive immigration. Many of Seattle's neighborhoods got their start around this time. Downtown Seattle was bustling with activity; as quickly as previous inhabitants moved out to newly created neighborhoods, new immigrants came in to take their place in the city core.

Once the obvious extensions of downtown had been made along the flatlands to the north and south, streetcars began providing transportation to new outlying neighborhoods.

Following the vision of city engineer R.H. Thomson, who had already played a key role in the development of municipal utilities, a massive effort was made to level the steep hills that rose south and north of the bustling city. A seawall containing spoils (dirt) sluiced from the Denny Regrade created the current waterfront. More spoils from the Denny Regrade went to build the industrial Harbor Island at the mouth of the Duwamish River, south of Downtown.

The Denny Regrade wasn't the only radical reshaping of Seattle's topography in this period. The slightly earlier Jackson Regrade had already reshaped Pioneer Square and the International District. The 1911–1917 construction of the Lake Washington Ship Canal included two major "cuts" (the Montlake Cut and the Fremont Cut), four bascule bridges, and the Government Locks (now Hiram M. Chittenden Locks). The level of Lake Washington dropped; the Black River, which formerly ran out of the south end of the lake, dried up completely, and Seward Island became the Seward Peninsula, now the site of Seward Park.

All of the expansion was happening without zoning, leading to "different land uses and economic classes everywhere [being] mixed."

At the same time as the city was expanding dramatically, the city planners began to put in parks and boulevards under a plan designed by the Olmsted Firm, providing numerous parks and about twenty miles of boulevard which link most of the parks and greenbelts within the city limits. Much of the ambiance of Seattle today derives from this project.

Where there had so recently been wilderness, increasingly there was the reality of a major city. The Seattle Symphony was founded in 1903, and while few, if any, other comparably important arts institutions were established, the story was different in more popular entertainments. Vaudeville impresarios Alexander Pantages, John Considine, and John Cort (the last also involved in legitimate theater) were all based in Seattle in this era.

The progressive school board hired a new superintendent in 1901, Frank B. Cooper, who oversaw a program of building many new schools in Seattle's neighborhoods. The schools expanded their curriculum from the basic core to include music and art, physical education, vocational training, and programs for immigrants and special needs students.

As a major port Seattle depended heavily on its waterfront. Before 1911 it was a confused jumble of private rail lines and docks. The progressive reformers rationalized the system by building a port owned and operated by local government. The efficient new system allowed Seattle to expand after 1945 with the Sea-Tac airport, and enabled Seattle to become one of the first Pacific Coast ports to move to containerized shipping and thus expand business with Asia.

Seattle trumpeted and celebrated its rise with the Alaska-Yukon-Pacific Exposition of 1909, but the city's rapid growth had led to much questioning of the social order. Not only the labor left, but also progressives calling for "good government" challenged the hegemony of the captains of industry. Rail baron James J. Hill, addressing Seattle business leaders in 1909, noted and regretted the change. "Where," he asked, "are the man who used to match your mountains...?"

Religion was less of a force in Seattle than in eastern cities, but the Protestant Social Gospel movement had a national leader in the Rev. Mark A. Matthews (1867-1940) of Seattle's First Presbyterian Church. He was a tireless reformer who investigated red light districts and crime scenes, denouncing corrupt politicians, businessmen and saloon keepers. With 10,000 members, his was the largest Presbyterian Church in the country, and he was selected the denomination's national moderator in 1912. He built a model church, with night schools, unemployment bureaus, a kindergarten, tuberculosis clinics, and America's first church-owned radio station. Matthews was the most influential clergymen in the Pacific Northwest.

=== World War I and after ===
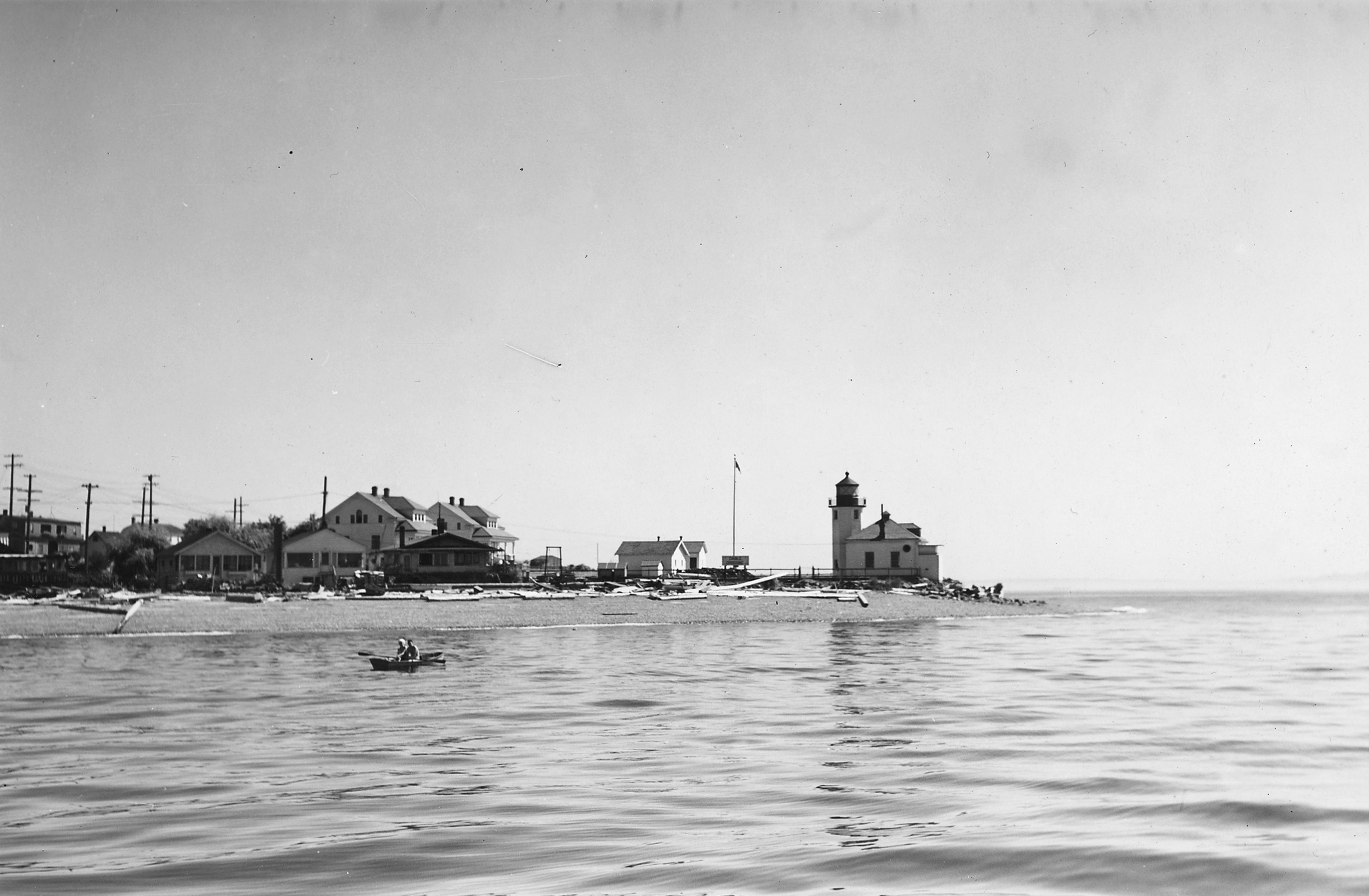
Alki Point Light was completed in 1913, where it marks the southern entrance of Elliott Bay.

In 1910, Seattle voters approved a referendum to create a development plan for the whole city. However, the result, known as the Bogue plan, was never to be implemented. The unused plan had at its heart a grand civic center in Belltown and the Denny Triangle connected to the rest of the city by a rapid transit rail system, with a huge expansion of the park system, crowned by a total conversion of 4,000-acre (1,600-hectare) Mercer Island into parkland. However, the plan was defeated by an alliance of fiscal conservatives who opposed such a purportedly grandiose plan on general principles and populists who argued that the plan would mainly benefit the rich.

Growth during this 1910s was almost all in lumber and maritime industries. With the Atlantic a scene of belligerency, World War I increased Pacific maritime trade and caused a boom in shipbuilding, there was very little growth in new industries. When the war ended, economic output crashed as the government stopped buying boats, and there were no new industries to pick up the slack. Seattle stopped being the place of explosive growth and opportunity it had been for two consecutive decades.

After the war, Western Washington was a center of radical labor agitation. Most dramatically, in 1919, a dispute over post-war lowering of waterfront wages spread to become the Seattle General Strike. The Industrial Workers of the World played a prominent role in the strike. Seattle mayor Ole Hanson became a prominent figure in the First Red Scare, and made an unsuccessful attempt to ride that backlash to the White House in an unsuccessful bid for the Republican nomination for the presidential election of 1920.

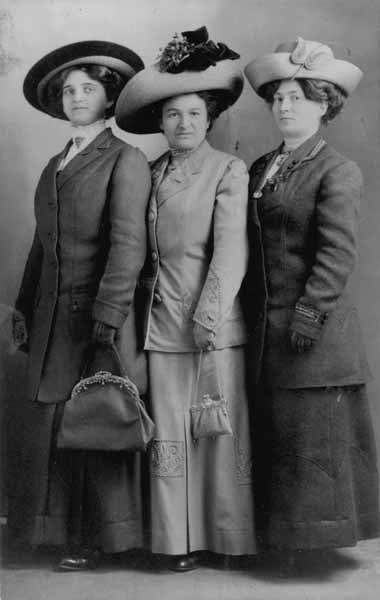
Jewish women in Seattle, ca. 1914-1925

On Monday, 5 July 1920, a Pageant of Democracy was performed in Woodland Park as part of Fourth of July celebrations and put on by the Central Labor Council.

Although no longer the economic powerhouse it had been at the turn of the century, Seattle first began seriously to be an arts center in the 1920s. The Frye and Henry families put on public display the collections that would become the core of the Frye Art Museum and Henry Art Gallery, respectively. Australian painter Ambrose Patterson arrived in 1919; over the next few decades Mark Tobey, Morris Graves, Kenneth Callahan, Guy Irving Anderson, and Paul Horiuchi would establish themselves as nationally and internationally known artists. Bandleader Vic Meyers and others kept the speakeasies jumping through the Prohibition era, and by mid-century the thriving jazz scene in the city's Skid Road district would launch the careers of musicians including Ray Charles and Quincy Jones.

In 1924, Seattle's Sand Point Airfield was the endpoint of the first aerial circumnavigation of the world. The historic flight helped convince Congress to develop Sand Point as a Naval Air Station.

The Great Depression hit Seattle hard. For example, Seattle issued 2,538 permits for housing construction in 1930, but only 361 in 1932. During the Maritime Strike of 1934, Smith Cove was nearly a battle zone; shippers were scared, to the point where Seattle lost most of its Asian trade to Los Angeles.

== World War II ==
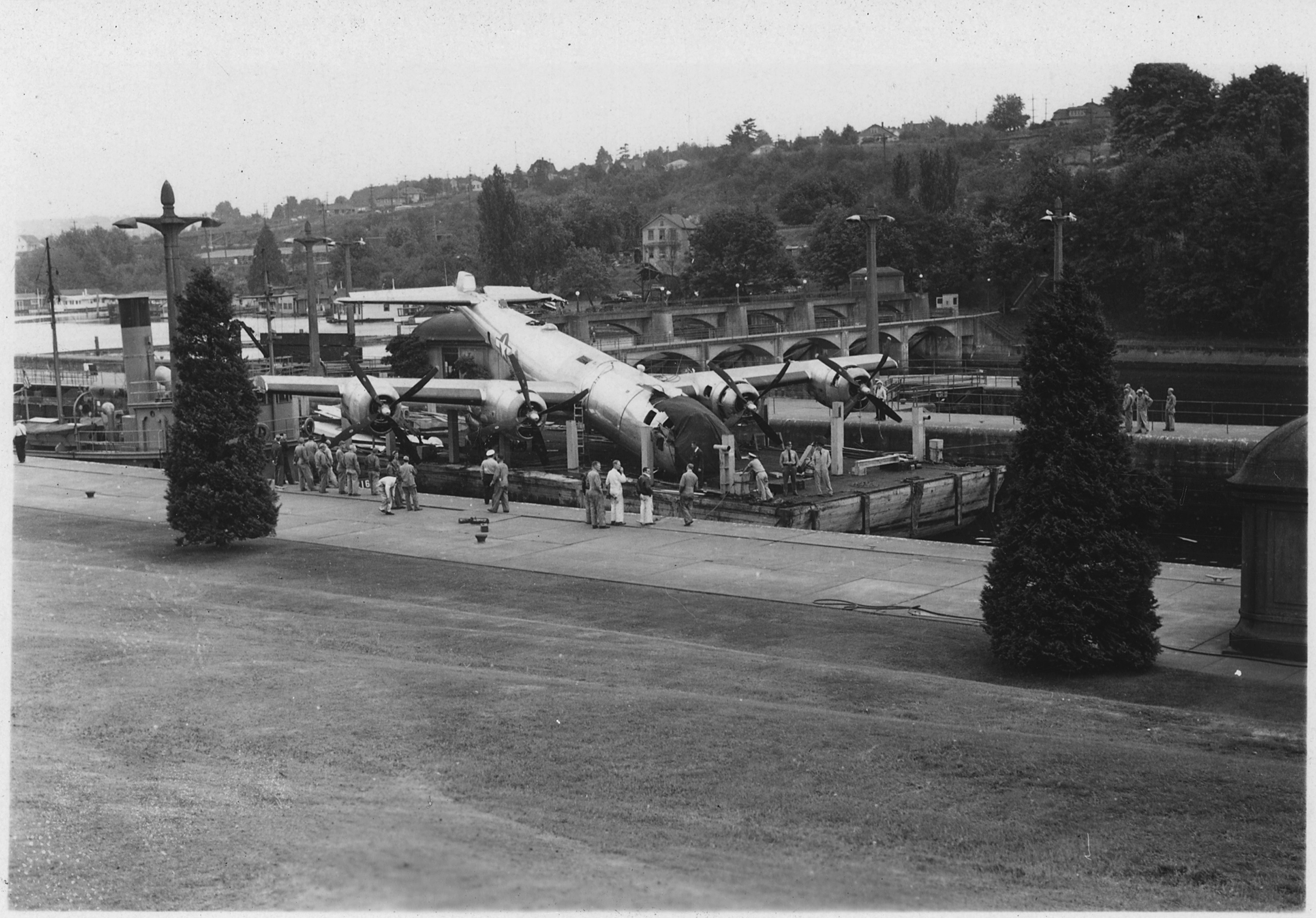
A newly built Boeing B-29 Superfortress traveling by barge in the Lake Washington Ship Canal in 1944.

Following Japan's surprise attack on Pearl Harbor, the U.S. entered World War II and the whole Puget Sound region was full on rolling in the nation's war effort. Among the chief priority was the federal government's sudden desire for tens of thousands of planes a year, and Boeing was positioned to provide them. Working under fixed-fee contracts, Boeing churned out aircraft and became by far the largest employer in Seattle. During the war, Seattle ranked as one of the top three cities in the nation in contracts per capita, and Washington state ranked as one of the top two in the nation for war contracts per capita. Seattle and Renton produced 8,200 planes, including 6,981 B-17s and more than 1,000 B-29 bombers. Civilian use of Boeing Field was greatly curtailed to accommodate the production of thousands of Boeing bombers. To accommodate the war effort, the U.S. military also annexed McChord Field in Tacoma, prompting that city to plead with the Port of Seattle to develop Seattle-Tacoma International Airport at Bow Lake—midway between the Sound's two major cities.

Puget Sound-area shipyards constructed a large number of war vessels. At the combined Todd Shipyards/Seattle-Tacoma Shipbuilding operation, 33,000 men and women worked in Tacoma to build five freighters, two transports, 37 escort carriers, five gasoline tankers, and three destroyer tenders. At the Seattle yards, 22,000 employees built 46 destroyers and three tenders for the United States Navy, plus other vessels. The Lake Washington Shipyard at Houghton, now annexed to Kirkland, employed 6,000 workers to repair dozens of merchant vessels and ferries during the war and to turn out ships for the Navy. The shipyard site is now the location of Carillon Point, a residential-commercial development. 15 smaller shipyards in Seattle and other cities in the Puget Sound area also produced vessels for the war effort.

The war also attracted tens of thousands of workers from across the country, as the greatly expanded wartime production quickly exhausted local labor pools. Of the five million rural southern African-Americans migrating to the industrial North and West during the second wave of the Great Migration, an estimated 45,000 went to the Pacific Northwest, of which 10,000 moved to Seattle. Most African American workers came to Seattle as shipyard employees, and by summer 1942, the National Youth Administration brought to the city the first group of blacks to work for Boeing. By war's end, 4,078 (7 percent) of the 60,328 shipyard workers in Seattle were African Americans. AA's also found work as non-military government employees. Of 18,862 federal employees in Seattle in 1945, 1,019 (5 percent) were black. Moreover, the 4,000 black soldiers and sailors stationed at Fort Lawton in Seattle and other military installations nearby contributed to the new employment diversity of the African American population. As a result, between 1940 and 1950, Seattle's black population grew 413 percent, from 3,789 to 15,666. The newcomers became permanent residents, building up black political influence, strengthening civil rights organizations such as the NAACP, and calling for antidiscrimination legislation. On the negative side, racial tensions increased, both black and white residential areas deteriorated from overcrowding, and inside the black community there were angry words between "old settlers" and recent arrivals for leadership in the black communities.

=== Japanese American community ===
Japanese-Americans living in the Pacific Northwest were heavily affected by the war; President Franklin D. Roosevelt authorized the removal of 110,000 Japanese immigrants and ethnic Japanese citizens from the West Coast to internment camps inland, relocating 7,000 people from the Seattle area alone. Seattle's Japantown, once the 2nd largest in the nation, was emptied. Local grocers and the Pike Place Market lost the bounty of hundreds of Japanese American truck farms, including the 55 families who had produced famed strawberries in Bellevue. Although most of their neighbors acquiesced to the internment of Japanese Americans, a few community leaders questioned its validity or necessity. Tacoma Mayor Harry P. Cain said, "America has always been interested in selection, and I feel it would be preferable to make careful selection of those who are evacuated then just to say, 'Let's get rid of our problem by the easiest, most obvious way, by moving everybody out'".

== Post-war boom 1945–1970 ==
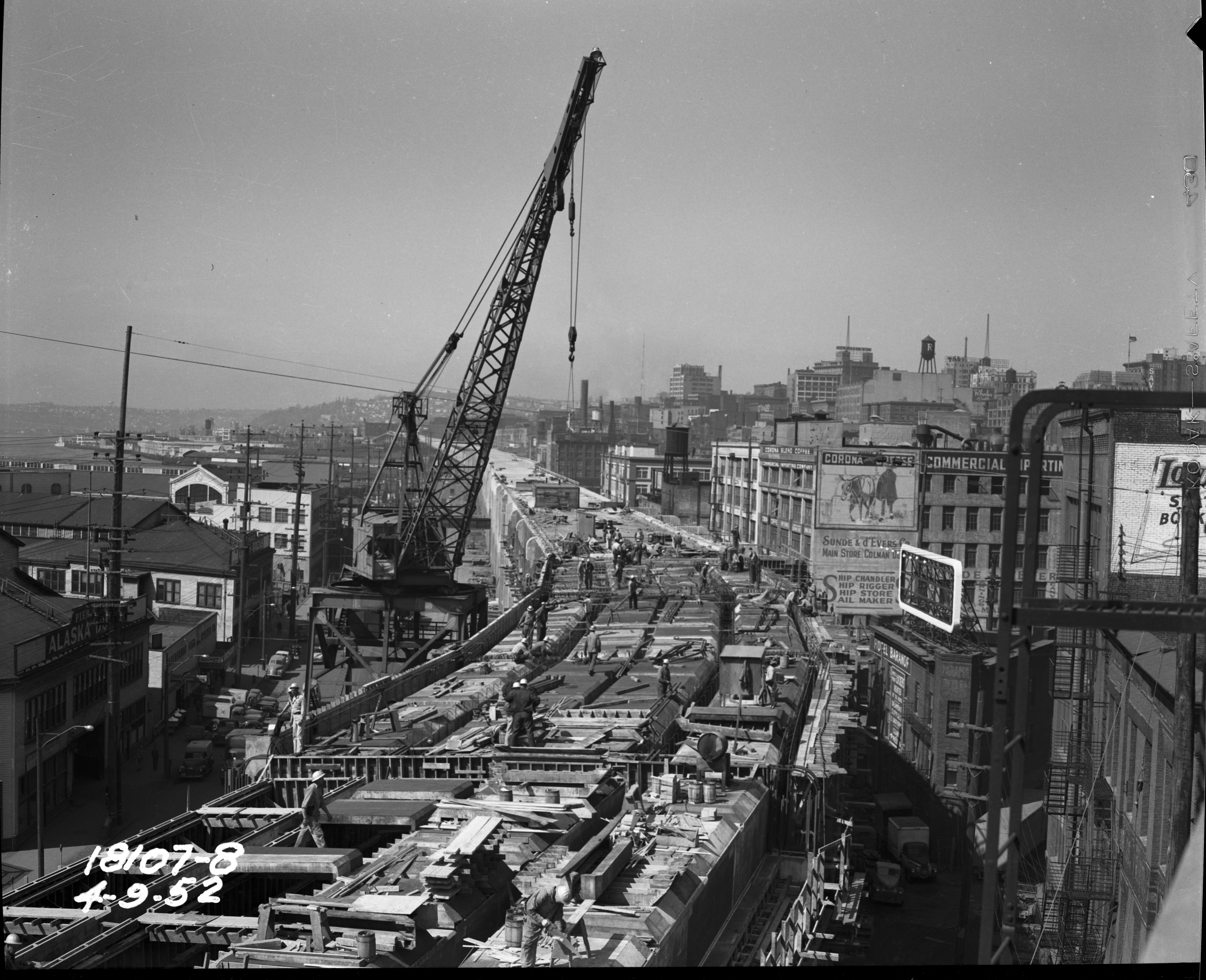
Building the Alaskan Way Viaduct, 1952.

After the war ended, the military canceled its bomber orders; Boeing factories shut down and 70,000 people lost their jobs, and initially it appeared that Seattle had little to show for the wartime Boeing boom. However, this period of stagnation soon ended with the rise of the jet aircraft and Boeing's reincarnation as the world's leading producer of commercial passenger planes.

With all the post-war growth came growing pollution of the lakes and rivers that provided much of beauty that had been Seattle's appeal to its recent immigrants. Also, the sprawl constantly demanded more roads, since the ones already built had terrible traffic. Jim Ellis and other Seattle natives, anxious to preserve the city in which they grew up, came together to institute the Metropolitan Problems Committee, or METRO, intended to manage and plan the metropolitan area. The original, comprehensive METRO regional plan was defeated in a vote by the suburbanites; METRO came back, scaled down to a sewage treatment and transport organization; METRO was eventually merged into the King County government.

During this period, Seattle attempted to counter the decline of its downtown and the area immediately to the north by hosting the Century 21 Exposition, the 1962 World's Fair. The fair, given a futuristic science theme, was designed to leave behind a civic center, now known as Seattle Center, including arts buildings, the Pacific Science Center and the Space Needle, and serving also as a fairground. In addition, freeways were built to compensate for all this new growth for people to commute. Most of the Eastside (east of Lake Washington) and northern suburbs came into being during the Boeing boom, as did Interstate Highways (I-5 and I-90). I-5 cut off Downtown Seattle from Capitol Hill and First Hill.

In conjunction with the fair, a demonstration monorail line was constructed at no cost to the city and was paid for out of ticket sales, and then turned over to the city for $600,000. (See Seattle Center Monorail.) It is now mostly a tourist attraction. The World's Fair arguably reenergized the downtown of Seattle, and was generally a smashing success, even finishing with a profit.

After the war, the University of Washington also took a step forward, finally fulfilling the promise of its name under university president Charles Odegaard. Starting in the late 1950s, Seattle was one of the centers of the emergence of the American counter-culture and culture of protest. Before grunge there were beats, fringies (a local Seattle term), hippies, and batcavers.

=== The Boeing Bust ===
Due to the simultaneous decline in Vietnam War military spending, the slowing of the space program as Project Apollo neared completion, the recession of 1969-1970, the cancellation of the supersonic transport (SST), and Boeing's $2 billion in debt as it built the 747 airliner, the company and the Seattle area greatly suffered. Commercial Airplane Group, by far the largest unit of Boeing, went from 83,700 employees in 1968 to 20,750 in 1971. Each unemployed Boeing employee cost at least one other job, and unemployment rose to 14%, the highest in the United States. Housing vacancy rates rose to 16% from 1% in 1967. U-Haul dealerships ran out of trailers because so many people moved out. A billboard appeared near the airport:

Will the last person

leaving SEATTLE-

Turn out the lights

After 1973, Seattle was in good company for its recession, since the rest of the country was also experiencing the energy crisis.

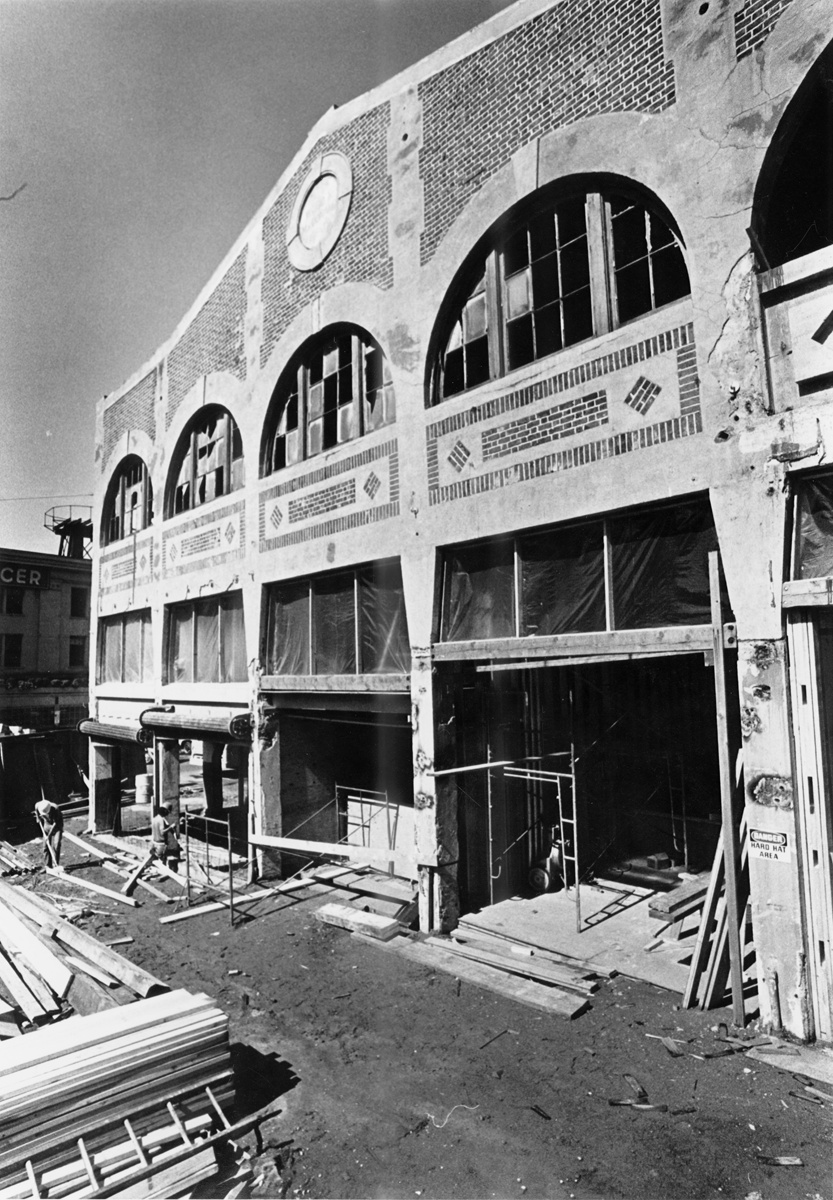
Rehabilitating Pike Place Market, 1975.

Pike Place Market, arguably Seattle's most important tourist attraction, gained its modern form in the aftermath of the Boeing crash. The internment of Seattle's Japanese-Americans during World War II had hit the market particularly hard, since 80% of its "wet stall" vendors had been ethnically Japanese. A "Keep the Market" initiative led by architect Victor Steinbrueck, passed in 1971, pushing for adaptive reuse. The initiative passed by a 3-2 margin, and created a seven acre historic district with management dedicated to preserving the market. The market now draws over 10 million visitors per year.

A similar story occurred with Pioneer Square. An old neighborhood, largely built after the Fire of 1889, it had fallen into derelict status after the war. However, with a reenergized downtown, businesses started to look for buildings that could be acquired cheaply. When offices moved into renovated buildings, suddenly there was a market for facilities to service them, leading to a "flood of other restaurants, galleries, boutiques." Seattle was definitely recovering from the blow dealt by the Boeing recession, refilling areas that had threatened to become slums.

== High tech: 1970 onwards ==
In 1979, Bill Gates (1955–) and Paul Allen (1953–2018), founders of Microsoft, moved their small company from New Mexico to the suburbs of their native Seattle. By 1985, sales were over $140 million, by 1990, $1.18 billion, and by 1995, Microsoft was the world's most profitable corporation, Allen and Gates were billionaires, and thousands of their past and present employees were millionaires. Microsoft spawned a host of other companies in the Seattle area: millionaire employees often left to found their own companies, and Allen, after his own departure from Microsoft, became a major investor in new companies. Seattle-area companies that owe their origins at least indirectly to Microsoft include RealNetworks, AttachmateWRQ, InfoSpace, and a host of others. Quite unlike Boeing, Microsoft has served as a catalyst for the creation of a whole realm of industry. Microsoft has also taken a much more active hand than Boeing in public works in the area, donating software to many schools (including the University of Washington).

Seattle has also been experiencing quite positive growth in the biotechnology and coffee sectors, with international coffeeshop chain Starbucks originating from Seattle, and Seattle-based Nordstrom now a national brand.

Paul Allen, whose fortune was made through Microsoft though he had long since ceased to be an active participant in the company, was a major force in Seattle politics. He attempted a voter initiative to build the Seattle Commons, a huge park in South Lake Union and the Cascade District, and even offered to put up his own money to endow a security force for the park, but it was defeated at the polls. (Allen then became the leader of the movement to redevelop this same area as a biotech center.) He did get a football stadium for the Seattle Seahawks through a successful statewide ballot initiative, and founded the Experience Music Project (originally intended as a Jimi Hendrix museum) on the grounds of Seattle Center.

Seattle's bid for the world stage by hosting the World Trade Organization Ministerial Conference of 1999 did not play out as planned. Instead, the city became the site of the first great street confrontation between the anti-globalization movement and the World Trade Organization on November 30, 1999. While many of those in the streets, and most of those in the suites, were from out of town or even out of country, much of the groundwork of Seattle hosting both the event and the protests against it can be attributed to local forces. In 2001 the central city was the site of rioting, mixed with partying and racially motivated violence against European Americans in the Seattle Mardi Gras riot. Seattle along with other west coast cities experienced politically inspired confrontations and violence during the May Day marches in 2015.

Seattle today is physically similar to the Seattle of the 1960s, while the demographics have begun to shift over time. It is still filled with single-family households, with whites making up 64.9% of the population (down from a high of 91.6% in 1960), Asians 16.3%, two or more races 8.8%, Black 6.8%, and Hispanic 7.2%. The city is politically still largely progressive, with about three quarters of a million people.

In 2023, Seattle became the first city in the United States to ban discrimination based on caste.

== See also ==
- Seattle Commune in the Soviet Union
- Seattle Police Department
- Timeline of Seattle

== Bibliography ==
- Blackford, Mansel G. "Reform Politics in Seattle During the Progressive Era, 1902-1916." Pacific Northwest Quarterly 59.4 (1968): 177-185 online
- Brown, Frederick L. "Cows in the Commons, Dogs on the Lawn: A History of Animals in Seattle" (PhD dissertation, University of Washington ProQuest Dissertations Publishing, 2010. 3431517).
- Cockburn, Alexander, and Jeffrey St Clair. Five days that shook the world: Seattle and beyond (Verso, 2000). in 1999
- Crowley, Walt (1999-07-01). "Lake Washington Ship Canal -- A Snapshot History". HistoryLink Essay 1444.
- Dolan, Maria; True, Kathryn (2003). Nature in the city: Seattle. Seattle: Mountaineers Books. ISBN 0-89886-879-3.
- Dutch, Steven, professor (November 15, 2005). "Seattle Underground". Natural and Applied Sciences. University of Wisconsin - Green Bay. Archived from the original on May 14, 2007.
- Friedheim, Robert L. The Seattle general strike (University of Washington Press, 2018.) on 1919
- Jones, Nard (1972). Seattle. New York City: Doubleday. ISBN 978-0-385-01875-3.
- Kim, Jae Yeon. "Racism is not enough: Minority coalition building in San Francisco, Seattle, and Vancouver." Studies in American Political Development 34.2 (2020): 195-215. online
- Klingle, Matthew W. Emerald City: an Environmental History of Seattle (Yale University Press, 2008).
- Lange, Greg (2000-08-25). "Black River disappears in July 1916". HistoryLink Essay 2624.
- Levi, Margaret, and David Olson. "The battles in Seattle." Politics & Society 28.3 (2000): 309-329. In 1999.
- MacDonald, Norbert. "Population Growth and Change in Seattle and Vancouver, 1880-1960." Pacific Historical Review 39.3 (1970): 297-321. online
- Mullins, William H. The Depression and the Urban West Coast, 1929-1933: Los Angeles, San Francisco, Seattle, and Portland (2000)
- Ochsner, Jeffrey Karl, ed. Shaping Seattle architecture: a historical guide to the architects (University of Washington Press, 2017).
- Oldham, Kit; Peter Blecha (2011). Rising Tides and Tailwinds: The Story of the Port of Seattle, 1911-2011. U. of Washington Press. ISBN 978-0-295-99131-3.
- Ott, Jennifer. Olmsted in Seattle: Creating a Park System for a Modern City ( Seattle: History Link and Documentary Media, 2019) online review
- Reiff, Janice L. "Urbanization and the Social Structure: Seattle, Washington, 1852-1910" (PhD dissertation, University of Washington; ProQuest Dissertations & Theses, 1981. 8113474).
- Rony, Dorothy B. Fujita. American workers, colonial power: Philippine Seattle and the Transpacific West, 1919-1941 (Univ of California Press, 2003).
- Sale, Roger (1976). Seattle: Past To Present. Seattle and London: University of Washington Press. ISBN 978-0-295-95521-6.; a standard scholarly history
- Sell, Terry M . Wings of Power: Boeing and the Politics of Growth in the Northwest (U of Washington Press, 2015) ISBN 9780295996257
- Smith, Jackie. "Globalizing resistance: The battle of Seattle and the future of social movements." Mobilization: An International Quarterly 6.1 (2001): 1-19. On 1999 online
- Speidel, William C. (1978). Doc Maynard: the man who invented Seattle. Seattle: Nettle Creek Publishing Company. pp. 196–197, 200. ISBN 978-0-914890-02-7.
  Speidel provides a substantial bibliography with extensive primary sources.
- Speidel, William C. (1967). Sons of the profits; or, There's no business like grow business: the Seattle story, 1851-1901. Seattle: Nettle Creek Publishing Company. pp. 196–197, 200. ISBN 9780914890003.
  Speidel provides a substantial bibliography with extensive primary sources.
- Taylor, Quintard. "Blacks and Asians in a white city: Japanese Americans and African Americans in Seattle, 1890-1940." Western Historical Quarterly (1991): 401–429. in JSTOR
- Taylor, Quintard. "Black Urban Development: Another View: Seattle's Central District, 1910-1940." Pacific Historical Review (1989): 429-448 in JSTOR
- Taylor, Quintard. "The Civil Rights Movement in the American West: Black Protest in Seattle, 1960-1970." Journal of Negro History (1995): 1-14. in JSTOR
- Van Pelt, Robert (2001). Forest giants of the Pacific Coast. Vancouver and San Francisco: Global Forest Society in association with University of Washington Press. pp. xxii, 181–185, 187–191. ISBN 0-295-98140-7.
- Webster, Janice Reiff. "Domestication and Americanization: Scandinavian women in Seattle, 1888 to 1900." Journal of Urban History 4.3 (1978): 275-290.
