= Timeline of Seattle =

City history timeline

Coordinates: 47.61°N 122.33°W

The following is a timeline of the history of the city of Seattle, Washington, USA.

== Before the 19th century ==
- Native Americans explore and settle throughout the Puget Sound region which includes the Seattle area.

== 19th century ==
- 1851
  - September 14: The Collins Party led by Luther Collins finds a settlement in present-day Georgetown. Scouts from the Denny Party arrive at Alki shortly after.
  - November 13: The remainder of the Denny Party arrives at Alki Point to spend a rainy winter.
- 1852 – The Denny Party moves to present day Downtown Seattle in April.
- 1853 – Seattle becomes seat of King County, Washington Territory.
- 1854 – School opens.
- 1855 – Population: 300.
- 1856 – Native American armed resistance to U.S. Imperialism, Settler colonialism, mining, and broken treaties attack Seattle in a single-day battle as part of the broader 1855 - 1858 Yakima War.
- 1858 – The arrival of Manuel Lopes, the city's first Black resident.
- 1861 – Washington Territorial University is established. This becomes the University of Washington.
- 1863 – Washington Gazette newspaper begins publication.
- 1864 – May 16: The Mercer Girls arrive.
- 1867 – Weekly Intelligencer newspaper begins publication, later becoming the Seattle Post-Intelligencer.
- 1868 – The Seattle Library Association is founded.
- 1869 – Henry A. Atkins becomes mayor.
- 1870
  - Central School opens.
  - Church of Our Lady of Good Help is founded.
  - Population: 1,107.
- 1873 – Seattle & Walla Walla Railroad is organized.
- 1874 – Gas street lamps are installed.
- 1875
  - San Francisco–Seattle steamship service begins.
  - Ms. Maynard's Reading Room opens.
- 1878 – Seattle Daily Post begins publication.
- 1879 – Squire opera house is built.
- 1880
  - City is chartered.
  - Frye opera house is built.
  - Population: 3,533.
- 1883 – Telephone and Columbia and Puget Sound Railroad begins operating.
- 1885 – Seattle, Lake Shore and Eastern Railway is organized.
- 1886 – February: Most Chinese are expelled by White mobs.
- 1888
  - Rainier Club is established.
  - Seattle Athletic Club is organized.
- 1889
  - Seattle Federation of Women's Clubs is organized.
  - June 6: Great Seattle Fire.
  - Seattle Fire Department is established.
  - Electric streetcar begins operating.
  - City becomes part of the new U.S. State of Washington.
- 1890
  - Telegraph newspaper begins publication.
  - Country Club is established.
  - Population: 42,837.
- 1891
  - Seattle Public Library opens.
  - The Seattle Times is founded as the Seattle Press-Times.
  - The Seattle Standard is founded as Seattle's first Black newspaper.
- 1892 – Pioneer Building is constructed.
- 1893
  - Great Northern Railway begins operating.
  - Seattle Theatre opens.
  - Curtis & Guptil photographers are in business.
- 1894
  - The Argus newspaper begins publication.
  - The Seattle Republican begins publication, becoming Seattle's first successful Black-owned newspaper.
- 1895 – Seattle General Hospital is established.
  - September 4: The University of Washington moves to its current location in Montlake.
- 1898 – U.S. assay office opens.
- 1899
  - The Seattle Star newspaper begins publication.
  - Tlingit totem pole is installed in Pioneer Place.
- 1900
  - Population: 80,671.
  - Seattle General Hospital re-opens in a new building.

== 20th century ==
=== 1900s–1940s ===
- 1901 – Renton Hill Community Improvement Club is organized.
- 1903
  - July 30: Semi-centennial of founding of Seattle.
  - City hires Olmsted Brothers to design public parks.
- 1905
  - South Seattle becomes part of the city.
  - Seattle Fine Arts Society is established.
- 1906
  - The Mountaineers (club) is formed.
  - Public Library building opens.
  - King Street Station opens.
- 1907
  - City expands, annexing Atlantic City, Ballard, Columbia, Dunlap, Rainier Beach, Ravenna, South-East Seattle, South Park, and West Seattle.
  - St. James Cathedral is built.
  - August 17: Pike Place Market opens.
- 1908 - The Great White Fleet visits Seattle and Puget Sound area.
- 1909
  - June 1: Alaska–Yukon–Pacific Exposition opens.
  - Chicago, Milwaukee & St. Paul Railroad begins operating.
- 1910
  - Georgetown becomes part of the city.
  - Municipal League of Seattle is founded.
  - Population: 237,194.
- 1911 – Port of Seattle is established.
- 1913
  - National Association for the Advancement of Colored People branch is established.
  - 20th Avenue NE Bridge opens.
- 1914 – Smith Tower is built.
- 1916
  - Seattle Audubon Society is established.
  - Coliseum Theater opens.
  - July 15: William Boeing incorporates Pacific Aero Products Co. This becomes the Boeing Company.
- 1918 – Bessaroth Synagogue is dedicated.
- 1919 – February: Seattle General Strike.
- 1920 – Seattle Northwest Enterprise newspaper begins publication.
- 1922 – The first Miss Seattle is crowned.
- 1923
  - Seattle Goodwill Industries is established.
  - Mountaineers Players (theatre troupe) is active.
- 1924
  - September 28: First aerial circumnavigation of the world lands at Sand Point.
  - Seattle Camera Club is founded.
- 1925
  - Sears, Roebuck store opens.
  - Eagles Auditorium Building is constructed.
  - Seattle Planning Commission is established.
- 1926
  - U.S. Naval Air Station is established at Sand Point.
  - Bertha Knight Landes is elected mayor, the first woman elected to head a major US city.
- 1928 – Civic Auditorium and Paramount Theatre opens.
- 1929 – Seattle Urban League is founded.
- 1930
  - Pike Place Fish Market and Japanese American Citizen's League are established.
  - Exchange Building is constructed.
- 1932 – Grace Hospital is established.
- 1933 – Seattle Art Museum opens.
- 1938 – Vedanta Society of Western Washington is founded.
- 1940
  - Population: 368,302.
  - April 28: Seattle trolleybus system opens.
- 1941 - April 12: Last streetcar line closes.
- 1946 – Seattle Foundation is established.
- 1947
  - Memorial Stadium opens.
  - September 1: Seattle-Tacoma International Airport (popularly known as Sea-Tac) begins operation.
- 1949 – Free port opens.

=== 1950s–1990s ===
- 1950
  - Seattle Chinese Golf Club is formed.
  - Population: 467,591.
- 1957 – Sister city relationship is established with Kobe, Japan.
- 1959 – City joins Puget Sound Governmental Conference.
- 1960 – Population: 557,087.
- 1961
  - Space Needle is built.
  - American Institute of Architects Seattle chapter becomes active.
- 1962
  - Alweg Monorail begins operating.
  - April 21 – Seattle World's Fair opens.
  - Congress of Racial Equality chapter is established.
  - Blaine Memorial United Methodist Church is built.
- 1963
  - Seattle Opera and Seattle Repertory Theatre is founded.
  - Martin Cinerama opens.
- 1964 - August 21: The Beatles performs at the Seattle Center Coliseum; they would perform again just over two years later.
- 1965
  - April 29: The 6.7 M_{w} Puget Sound earthquake affects western Washington with a maximum Mercalli intensity of VIII (Severe), causing seven deaths and $12.5–28 million in financial losses in the Puget Sound region.
  - ACT Theatre is founded.
- 1967
  - November: Radical Women is founded.Seattle Radical Women, one of first women's liberation groups in the United States, forms in November 1967.
  - Allied Arts of Seattle is founded.
  - Sister city relationship is established with Bergen, Norway.
- 1969
  - Seafirst Building is constructed. This is Seattle's tallest building for the next 16 years.
- 1970 – Seattle Marathon, and negative income tax program begins.
- 1971
  - Mayor's Arts Festival begins (later known as Bumbershoot).
  - Starbucks opens its first store near the Pike Place Market.
  - Seattle voters approve the "Let's Keep the Market" initiative, preserving the Pike Place Market
- 1972
  - Pacific Northwest Dance Association is established.
  - Intiman Theatre Festival begins.
- 1973 – Sister city relationship is established with Tashkent, Uzbekistan.
- 1974 – Seattle Seahawks franchise is established, beginning play in 1976.
- 1976 – Daybreak Star Cultural Center opens.
- 1977
  - Seattle Mariners baseball team is formed.
  - Sister city relationship is established with Beersheba, Israel.
- 1978 – Central Co-op is established.
- 1979
  - P-Patch Advisory Council is established.
  - Music Magazine The Rocket begins publishing.
  - June 1: Seattle SuperSonics basketball team wins NBA Finals.
  - Sister city relationship is established with Mazatlán, Mexico.
- 1980
  - Subterranean Pop fanzine begins publication.
  - Sister city relationship is established with Nantes, France.
  - The last Chicago, Milwaukee, St. Paul and Pacific Railroad train leaves Seattle before abandonment.
- 1981 – Sister city relationship is established with Christchurch, New Zealand; and Mombasa, Kenya.
- 1982 – Market Park is landscaped.
- 1983 – Sister city relationship is established with Chongqing, China.
- 1984
  - 911 Media Arts Center and Weird Science Salon is founded.
  - Sister city relationship is established with Limbe, Cameroon.
- 1985
  - Seattle Municipal Archives are established.
  - The 76-story Columbia Seafirst Center is built and becomes the city's tallest building. In response, the Citizen Alternative Plan (CAP) advocates for height limits in Downtown.
- 1986 – Sister city relationships is established with Galway, Ireland; and Reykjavík, Iceland.
- 1988
  - Washington State Convention Center and Telephone Museum both open.
  - Nirvana issues its first release, a 7" with Love Buzz and Big Cheese on Seattle's SubPop Records.
- 1989
  - Jim McDermott becomes U.S. representative for Washington's 7th congressional district.
  - Sister city relationship is established with Daejeon, South Korea.
- 1990
  - September 15: Downtown Seattle Transit Tunnel opens.
  - October: Pearl Jam plays its first concert ever in Seattle's Off Ramp Café.
  - Norm Rice becomes mayor.
  - Population: 516,259.
- 1991
  - Sustainable Seattle nonprofit is established.
  - Washington Hemp Expo begins.
  - Seattle Art Museum is rebuilt.
  - Sister city relationships is established with Cebu, Philippines; and Kaohsiung, Taiwan.
- 1992 – Sister city relationship is established with Pécs, Hungary; and Surabaya, Indonesia.
- 1993
  - Seattle Knights jousting acting troupe is founded.
  - Fictional movie Sleepless in Seattle is released.
  - Sister city relationships is established with Gdynia, Poland; and Perugia, Italy.
- 1994
  - Amazon.com is established.
  - Seattle Asian Art Museum opens.
  - City Public Access Network goes online.
- 1996 – Sister city relationship is established with Haiphong, Vietnam.
- 1997
  - Seattle Internet Exchange and Seattle Channel are established.
  - Jet City Maven newspaper begins publication.
- 1998 – Paul Schell becomes mayor.
- 1999
  - November 30: Anti-globalization protests during World Trade Organization Ministerial Conference.
  - Town Hall Seattle opens.
  - Sister city relationship is established with Sihanoukville, Cambodia.
- 2000
  - Experience Music Project opens.
  - Music Magazine The Rocket ceases publishing.

== 21st century ==
- 2001
  - February 27: Seattle Mardi Gras Riots
  - February 28: Nisqually earthquake
  - September: Boeing relocates its corporate headquarters to Chicago, Illinois.
- 2002 - July 28: The first sporting event at Seahawks Stadium, a Seattle Sounders soccer match, is held
- 2004
  - Seattle Central Library building opens.
  - Seattle Civil Rights and Labor History Project is founded.
  - Rat City Rollergirls (rollerderby league) is founded.
- 2006
  - Seattle Metropolitan begins publication.
  - Kavana Cooperative is founded.
- 2007 - December 12: South Lake Union Streetcar line opens.
- 2008
  - Tilted Thunder Rail Birds (rollerderby league) is formed.
  - Seattle SuperSonics move to Oklahoma City
- 2009
  - July 18: Central Link light rail begins service between Westlake and Tukwila.
  - December 19: Central Link is extended to SeaTac Airport.
  - InvestigateWest news is headquartered in Seattle.
  - Upping Technology for Underserved Neighbors and Jigsaw Renaissance is founded.
  - CondoInternet is established.
- 2010
  - Northwest Chocolate Festival begins.
  - Michael McGinn becomes mayor.
  - Population: 608,660; metro 3,439,809.
- 2011
  - Seattle Shorts Film Fest begins.
  - Citizen University is headquartered in city.
- 2012
  - Ban against plastic shopping bags goes into effect.
  - Chihuly Garden and Glass and Living Computer Museum opens.
- 2013
  - Construction of the Alaskan Way Viaduct replacement tunnel by the tunnel-boring machine Bertha begins.
  - Population: 652,405.
- 2014
  - January: Ed Murray becomes mayor.
  - February: Seattle Seahawks win Super Bowl football contest.
  - May: City minimum wage hike is announced.
- 2015
  - May: A large kayak protest against Arctic oil drilling is held on Elliott Bay in response to a Shell oil platform arriving at the Port of Seattle.
  - September: School teachers strike
- 2016
  - January 23: First Hill Streetcar line opens.
  - March 19: University Link Tunnel extends light rail to Capitol Hill and Husky Stadium.
- 2020
  - Beginning in March: During the week, in response to the COVID pandemic across Washington, 3 counties in the Seattle metropolitan area issued directives for residents to shelter-in-place until at least the 7th of April.
  - Beginning in May: George Floyd protests in Seattle begin.
  - Population: 737,015; metro: 3,433,000
- 2023 - February 21: Seattle becomes the first city in the United States to ban discrimination based on caste.
- 2025 - Official reopening of Waterfront Park and Pier 58 after years of renovation following the removal of the Alaskan Way Viaduct.

== See also ==
- History of Seattle
- Neighborhoods in Seattle
- List of mayors of Seattle
- Timelines of Seattle's sister cities: Bergen, Kobe, Mombasa, Nantes, Perugia, Reykjavík, Tashkent
- Timeline of Spokane, Washington
- Timeline of the Tri-Cities, Washington
- Timeline of Washington (state) history

== Bibliography ==
=== Published in the 19th century ===
- "Seattle". Puget Sound Business Directory. Olympia: Murphy & Harned. 1872. hdl:2027/njp.32101079826390.
- Seattle City Directory for 1890. Seattle: Polk's Seattle Directory Co. hdl:2027/inu.30000096136753.
- John W. Dodge (1890), Wonderful City ... Seattle, Seattle: Lowman & Hanford Stationery and Printing Company, OCLC 18272367, OL 6945576M
- Washington the Evergreen state, and Seattle, its metropolis. Crawford & Conover. 1890. Archived from the original on December 31, 2013.
- Frederic James Grant, ed. (1891). History of Seattle, Washington. New York. ISBN 9780598280718. Archived from the original on December 31, 2013.
- Seattle pioneer pocket guide, Seattle, Wash.: Arthur von Babo, 1891, OCLC 21128971

=== Published in the 20th century ===
- Polk's Seattle City Directory. Seattle. 1901. Archived from the original on December 31, 2013.
- Chamber of Commerce (1903). Semi-Centennial Celebration of the Founding of Seattle. Archived from the original on January 1, 2014.
- "Seattle", United States (4th ed.), Leipzig: K. Baedeker, 1909, OCLC 02338437
- "Seattle" . Encyclopædia Britannica. Vol. 24 (11th ed.). 1910. pp. 563–564.
- Seattle (Wash.). Municipal Plans Commission (1911), Plan of Seattle, Seattle: Lowman & Hanford Co., OCLC 1440455, OL 6540540M
- "King County: Seattle", Puget Sound and Western Washington, Seattle: Robert A. Reid, 1912, OCLC 3425016
- Raymer's Dictionary of Greater Seattle. Seattle: Raymer's Old Book Store. 1913. Archived from the original on October 23, 2013.
- Clarence B. Bagley (1916), History of Seattle, Chicago: S.J. Clarke Publishing Company v.2
- "Points of Interest in Seattle, Wash.". Automobile Blue Book. New York. 1919. Archived from the original on January 1, 2014.
- Cornelius Hanford, Seattle and Enzirons, 1852–1924 (Seattle, 1924)
- Federal Writers' Project (1941), Washington: a Guide to the Evergreen State, American Guide Series, Portland, OR: Binfords & Mort, hdl:2027/uc1.b3624995 – via HathiTrust
- "Seattle, City of Two Voices", National Geographic Magazine, vol. 117, Washington, D.C., 1960 – via Gale
- Roger Sale, Seattle: Past to Present (Seattle, 1976)
- Mansel G. Blackford (1980). "Civic Groups, Political Action, and City Planning in Seattle, 1892–1915". Pacific Historical Review. 49 (4): 557–580. doi:10.2307/3638967. JSTOR 3638967.
- Ory Mazar Nergal, ed. (1980), "Seattle", Encyclopedia of American Cities, New York: E.P. Dutton, OL 4120668M
- Richard C. Berner, Seattle in the 20th Century (Seattle: Charles Press, 1991)
- Quintard Taylor (1991). "Blacks and Asians in a White City: Japanese Americans and African Americans in Seattle, 1890–1940". Western Historical Quarterly. 22 (4): 401–429. doi:10.2307/970984. JSTOR 970984.
- Carl Abbott (1992). "Regional City and Network City: Portland and Seattle in the Twentieth Century". Western Historical Quarterly. 23 (3): 293–322. doi:10.2307/971508. JSTOR 971508. Archived from the original on September 26, 2020.
- Bob Lane, Better Than Promised, An Informal History of the Municipality of Metropolitan Seattle (Seattle: King County Department of Metropolitan Services, 1995)
- Richie Unterberger (1998), Seattle, Rough Guides, London, OL 24372137M

=== Published in the 21st century ===
- Vince Kueter (November 13, 2001). "Seattle Through the Years". The Seattle Times. Archived from the original on October 23, 2013.
- "150 Most Influential People in Seattle/King County History: Nominees", The Seattle Times, 2001, archived from the original on November 16, 2014
- Keiko Tanaka (2001). "Early Telephone Use in Seattle, 1880s–1920s". Pacific Northwest Quarterly. 92 (4): 190–202. JSTOR 40492685.
- Jeffrey Karl Ochsner; Dennis Alan Andersen (2002). "Meeting the Danger of Fire: Design and Construction in Seattle after 1889". Pacific Northwest Quarterly. 93 (3): 115–126. JSTOR 40492770.
- "Seattle in Focus: A Profile from Census 2000". Washington, D.C.: Brookings Institution. 2003. Archived from the original on February 21, 2014.
- John Putman (2004). "Racism and Temperance: The Politics of Class and Gender in Late 19th-Century Seattle". Pacific Northwest Quarterly. 95 (2): 70–81. JSTOR 40491731.
- Sohyun Park (2007). "Prescriptive Plans for a Healthy Central Business District: Seattle Downtown Design, 1956–1966". Pacific Northwest Quarterly. 98 (3): 107–114. JSTOR 40492027.
- Elenga, Maureen R. (2007). Seattle Architecture: A Walking Guide To Downtown. Seattle Architecture Foundation. ISBN 978-0-615-14129-9.
- Jyotsna Sreenivasan (2009). "Seattle/Denver Income Maintenance Experiments". Poverty and the Government in America: A Historical Encyclopedia. ABC-CLIO. p. 558+. ISBN 978-1-59884-168-8.
- Coll Thrush (2009). Native Seattle: histories from the crossing-over place. University of Washington Press. ISBN 978-0-295-98992-1.
- Susan P. Crawford; et al. (2014), Community Fiber in Washington, D.C., Seattle, WA, and San Francisco, CA: Developments and Lessons Learned, Berkman Center Research Publication, SSRN 2439429 – via Social Science Research Network
- Raj Chetty; Nathaniel Hendren (2015), City Rankings, Commuting Zones: Causal Effects of the 100 Largest Commuting Zones on Household Income in Adulthood, Equality of Opportunity Project, Harvard University, archived from the original on May 6, 2015, "Rank #1: Seattle"

== Images ==
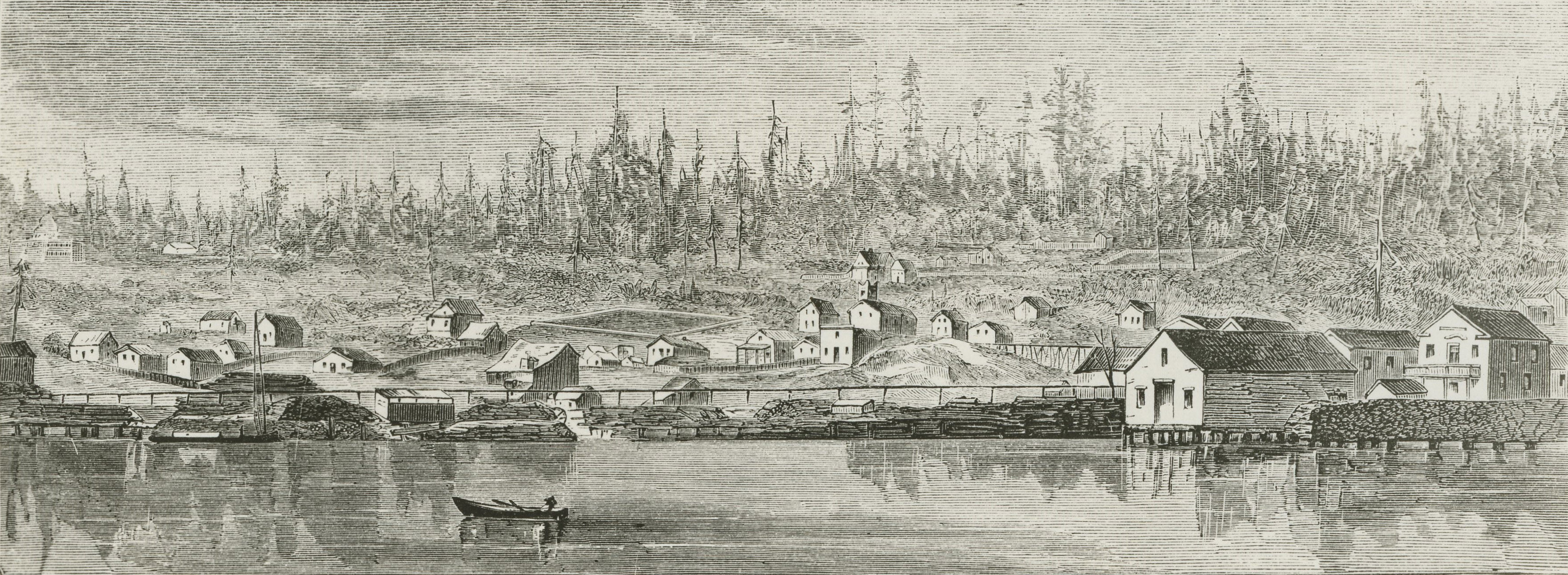
Seattle, circa 1870

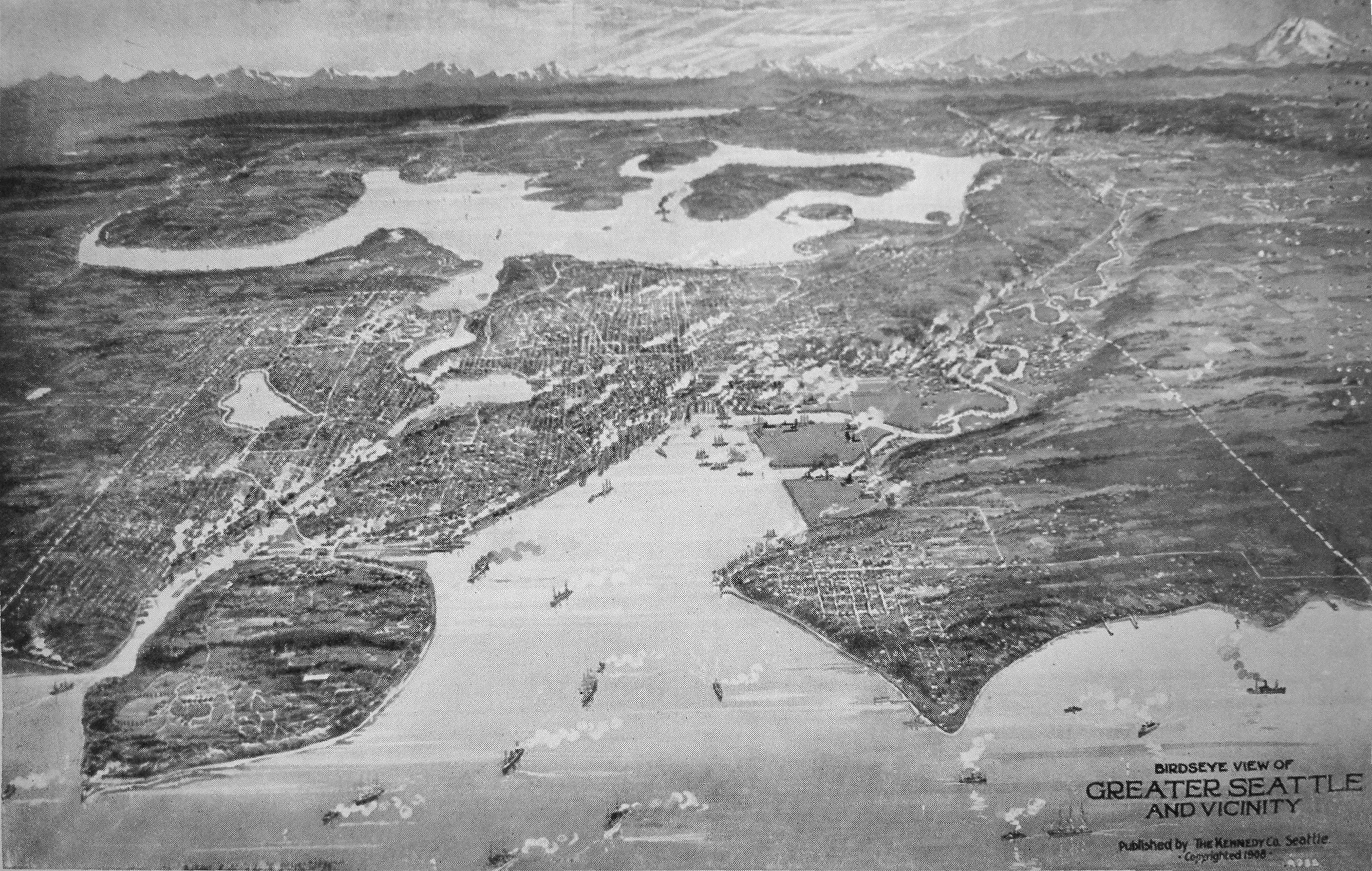
Seattle, 1908

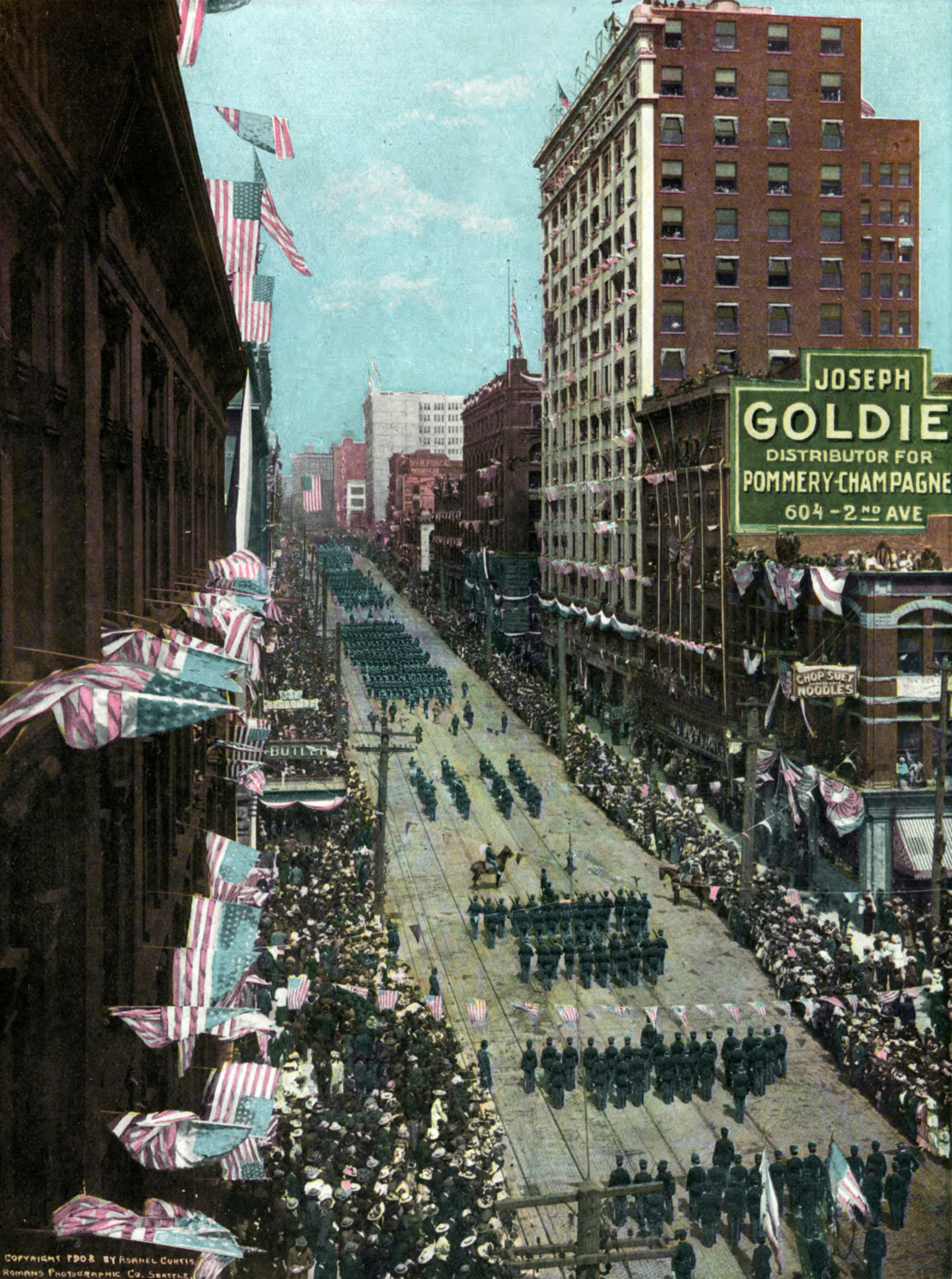
Atlantic Squadron parade, 1908

Map of Seattle and port, 1918

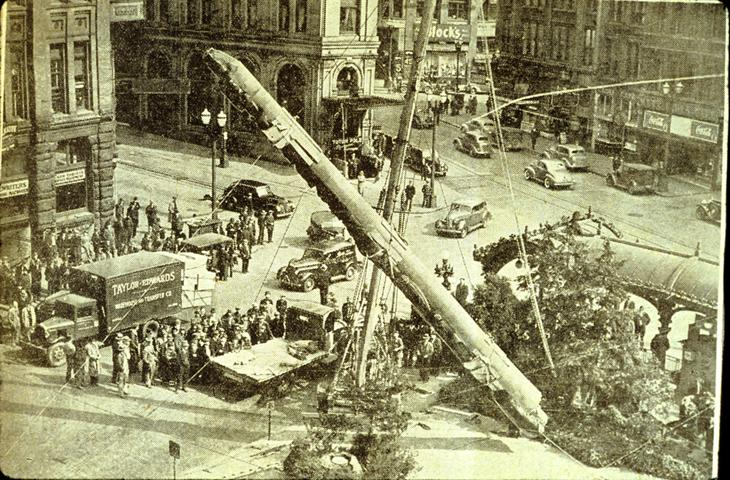
Reinstallation of Pioneer Square totem pole, 1940

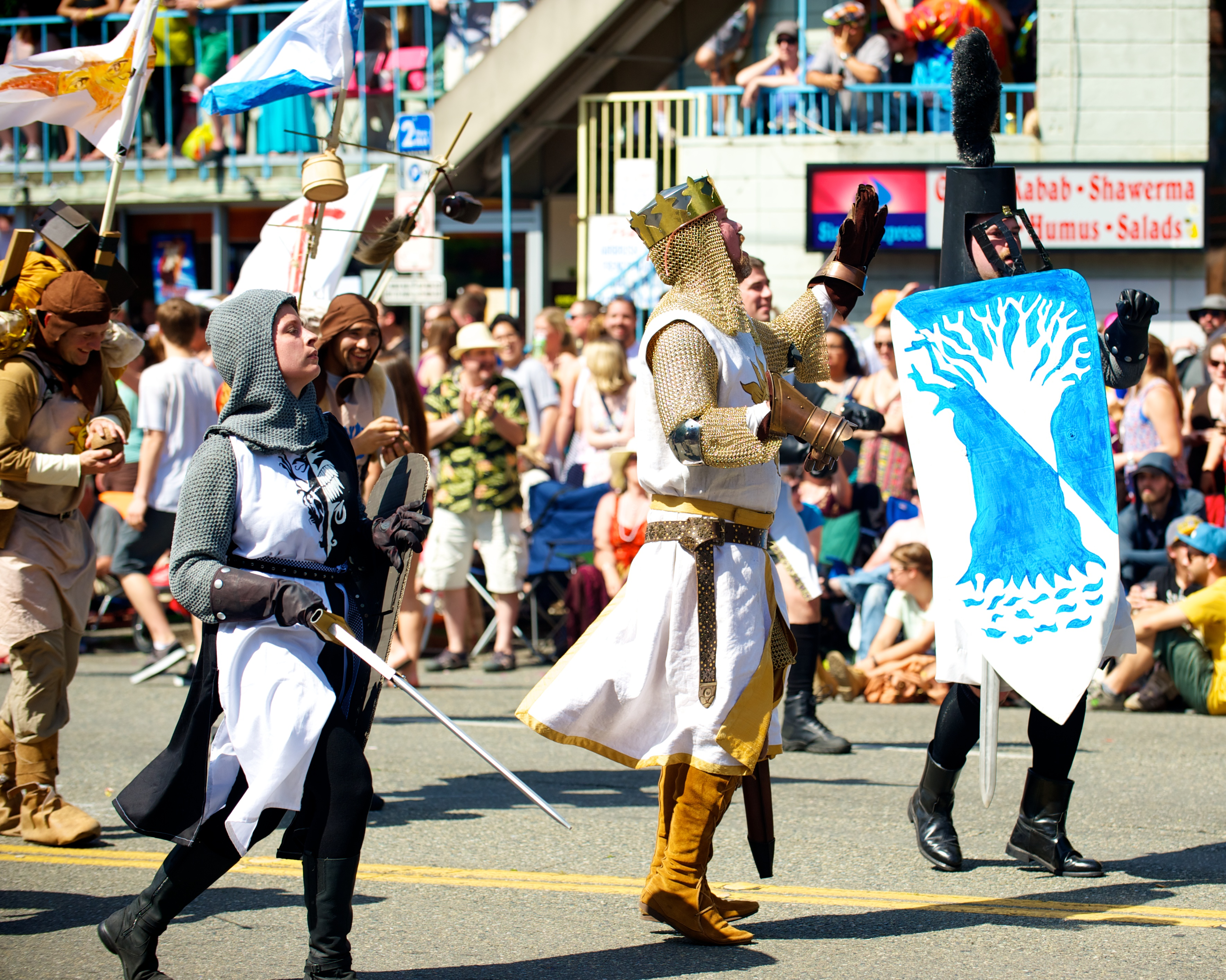
Solstice Parade, 2013
