= Seattle riots =

Seattle riots may refer to:

- Seattle riot of 1886
- WTO Ministerial Conference of 1999 protest activity
- Seattle Mardi Gras riots
- George Floyd protests in Seattle
