= Murder of Kris Kime =

2001 crime in Seattle, Washington, US

Murder of Kristopher "Kris" Kime
- Native name: Kristopher Randal Kime
- Date: February 28, 2001
- Time: Early morning (PST)
- Venue: Pioneer Square
- Location: Seattle, Washington, U.S.
- Type: Crime, murder
- Cause: Assault during the Seattle Mardi Gras Riots
- Target: Kristopher "Kris" Kime
- Perpetrator: Jerell Thomas
- Outcome: Death of Kristopher Kime, legal and public response
- Deaths: 1 (Kristopher Kime)
- Arrests: Jerell Thomas
- Convicted: Jerell Thomas (initially second-degree murder, later changed to second-degree manslaughter)
- Charges: Second-degree murder (initial conviction), second-degree manslaughter (retrial)
- Trial: 2001 (first trial), 2006 (retrial)
- Verdict: Guilty of second-degree manslaughter (retrial)
- Convictions: Jerell Thomas
- Sentence: 10 years (retrial; released in 2009)
- Litigation: Kime's family filed a lawsuit against the City of Seattle
- Memorial plaque placed in Pioneer Square; Kime's organs were donated

The murder of Kristopher "Kris" Kime (June 25, 1980 – February 28, 2001) was the killing of a 20-year-old Auburn, Washington resident and Highline Community College (Des Moines, Washington) student when he was knocked down and beaten to death during the Seattle Mardi Gras Riots in the city's Pioneer Square district in the early morning hours of February 28, 2001.

Kristopher Randal "Kris" Kime was bending over to help a young woman who was lying on the ground and being attacked. As he bent over, he was struck on the back of his head by Jerell Thomas. He fell onto the pavement and struck his head again. As he lay there, other rioters began to kick him. His friends and others surrounded him to protect him. His friends ran to the police and asked for assistance. The police were instructed they could not enter the riot zone, so they did not intervene. Off-duty fire department workers and his friends carried Kris out of the zone onto a nearby street. He was placed in a police vehicle, driven to Harborview Medical Center, and placed on life support. He died later the following night. The cause of death was listed as resulting from a fractured skull and subdural hematoma.

Kime's mother, Kimberly Kime-Parks, blasted the Seattle Police Department for letting the riots escalate out of control. "I always thought police were there to protect and serve, but they weren't there to protect and serve my son", she said. Other people questioned why police didn't act sooner. In the wake of the riots, Mayor Paul Schell announced a moratorium on Mardi Gras celebrations in Seattle. Kime's family filed a lawsuit against the City of Seattle, claiming the city had enhanced the danger to citizens, a claim based on instructions given to police officers to stand by and not intervene. The lawsuit claimed this empowered and emboldened lawlessness as gang members and others brutalized innocent revelers. When the case settled, the family received $1,750,000 from the City of Seattle, and annuity payments to be used to set up a scholarship in Kris Kime's name. In addition, a bronze plaque was placed in Pioneer Square in memorial to Kris's life.

The attacker was identified by police as 17-year-old Jerell Thomas. He was convicted of second-degree murder in 2001. The conviction was overturned by the Washington State Court of Appeals. The appeal was based on a prior state Supreme Court decision ruling that an assault leading to death cannot be murder without intent to kill. In 2006, Thomas was retried and pleaded guilty to the lesser charge of second-degree manslaughter, receiving a 10-year jail sentence. Thomas was released from prison in December 2009. Since that time, Thomas has been convicted in multiple domestic violence incidents. He is serving a five-year prison sentence for domestic violence assault and harassment with an additional firearms charge stemming from a 2011 incident with a girlfriend.

A CBS News story in March 2006 reported that Kime's organs had been made available for donation after his death. Five recipients received organ transplants. The five recipients of Kime's organs were invited to the wedding of Kime's sister, Kirsten, which was held in May 2006.
