= Francis X. Prefontaine =

French Canadian priest and missionary

The Right Reverend Monsignor Francis Xavier Prefontaine
- Pastor of Our Lady of Good Help, Seattle
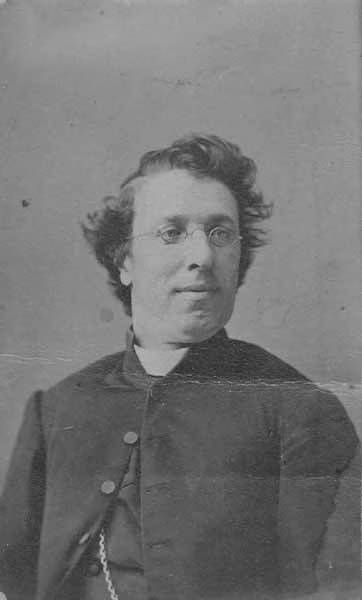
- Francis Xavier Prefontaine, circa 1880
- Native name: François Xavier Préfontaine
- Church: Roman Catholic
- Diocese: Seattle

Orders
- Ordination: 1863

Personal details
- Born: 1838 Longueuil, Lower Canada
- Died: 1909 (aged 70–71) Seattle, Washington
- Buried: Calvary Cemetery, Seattle; 47.667°N 122.293°W
- Residence: 1222 Fifteenth Avenue North; Seattle, Washington
- Education: Grand Seminary of Montreal

Francis Xavier Prefontaine (French: François Xavier Préfontaine; 1838–1909) was a French Canadian Catholic priest and missionary, an early resident in the pioneer days of Seattle, Washington, and a figure in the history of Seattle and the Puget Sound region of Washington State. He was Seattle's first resident Catholic priest and built the city's first Catholic church.

== Early life ==
Préfontaine was born in Longueuil, Quebec, near Montreal, Quebec, Canada, in 1838, the eldest of five children in a French-speaking, devout Catholic family. His early education took place at parochial schools and Nicolet College and he went on to study for the priesthood at the Grand Seminary of Montreal in 1859. Within three weeks after his graduation and ordination on November 20, 1863, he departed on a long sea voyage for Washington Territory in the United States via the Isthmus of Panama. He was never to return to his native Quebec.

== First mission ==
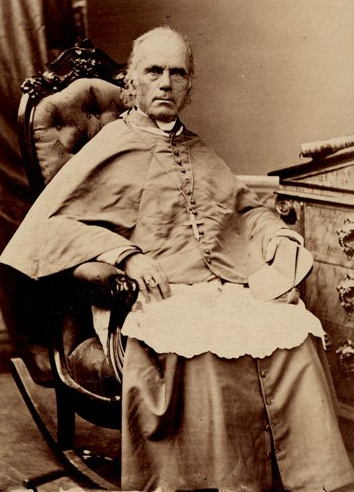
Bishop Blanchet, about 1870

Prefontaine's voyage finally brought him to Vancouver, Washington, in February 1864. In Vancouver he served under Augustin-Magloire Blanchet, Bishop of Nesqually (now the Archdiocese of Seattle) and a fellow French Canadian. Prefontaine spoke no English, so during his stay in Vancouver he studied English and also Chinook Jargon, a pidgin trade language of the Pacific Northwest.

Blanchet assigned the young priest to a ministry at Fort Stevens on the Oregon side of the mouth of the Columbia River. During his trip out to this rainy and foggy coast, he lost his way and had to spend a night out in the open. When he awoke in the morning he discovered that he had spent the night in an Indian burial ground.

== Steilacoom ==
Upon completion of Prefontaine's assignment at Fort Stevens, Bishop Blanchet sent him to Steilacoom, Washington, near Tacoma. The bishop assigned him to such duties as saying mass for the nuns and parishioners, providing for the education of the children, and supervising the building of several churches in the area. While he was in Steilacoom he met and worked with Mother Joseph of the Sisters of Providence. She was a fellow French Canadian missionary, whose mission was also to build churches and schools.

== Port Townsend ==
In 1865 Bishop Blanchet divided the Puget Sound region of the diocese into two missions. He assigned Prefontaine to the northern mission where he set up his headquarters in the only town that had a Catholic church, Port Townsend. From there he journeyed around the entire territory, travelling in canoes with the Indians and sleeping in forests and on stream banks. He ministered to the Indians and the white settlers, both Catholics and non-Catholics.

== Seattle ==
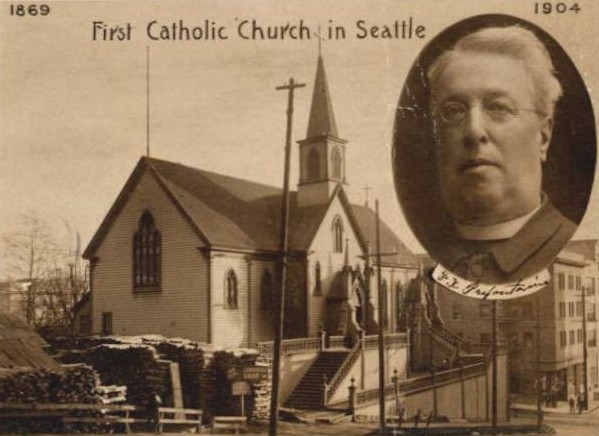
Father Francis X. Prefontaine and the Our Lady of Good Help Church, which he built in 1869

Prefontaine first landed in Seattle at what is now Pioneer Square and decided to set up a ministry there. At that time Seattle was a lumber-mill town and had only about 600 residents. Prefontaine counted only ten Catholics in the town and only three attended the first mass that he conducted. Bishop Blanchet warned Prefontaine that Seattle had little potential as a Catholic mission, but nevertheless, the bishop gave Prefontaine permission to establish a permanent parish there.

Prefontaine rented a small two-room house at Third Avenue and Yesler Way in Seattle for $6 per month to be used as a church as well as his living quarters. He converted one room to a small chapel so that he could conduct services there while working to raise funds to build a church. He held his first Mass there on November 24, 1867.

=== The Church of Our Lady of Good Help ===
He asked permission from Bishop Blanchet to build a church in Seattle to support his mission. The bishop had believed that Seattle was a lost cause, but nevertheless he gave the priest permission to build a church as long as Prefontaine would raise the money for it himself and it would cost the diocese nothing. In order to raise money for the church, he held fairs in various towns around the Puget Sound area, including Seattle, Olympia, and Port Gamble, eventually raising $2,000. Prefontaine purchased a plot of land near his house on Third Avenue and Washington Street and began construction of a small church there. He did most of the work himself, including clearing the land and constructing the building.

The plot of land that he purchased was heavily wooded and had to be cleared in order to build the church. Recalled Prefontaine in 1902:

I have vivid recollection of the time we had clearing the land for the new church. Every foot of it was covered with monster trees and dense underbrush. One giant of the forest that we cut down I remember measured eight feet in diameter at the butt and had roots which extended from one side of the block to the other and which on the south drank in the waters of a little creek that ran down the ravine on the north side of which the church was to stand. We were three months in getting rid of the stumps and underbrush that remained after the trees were felled. In clearing the ground we dug up three relics of the Indian War of 1856, one was a monstrous iron key which belonged to the quartermaster of the sloop of war Decatur and two government bayonets.

Prefontaine may have hired the lumber baron Henry Yesler to fell the trees on the land before building the church. Yesler was later to claim that he had supplied the lumber for Seattle's first Catholic Church.

Prefontaine began construction of the church in the winter of 1868–69 and the church was completed and dedicated in the autumn of 1870.

The church was small: only 50 ft × 25 ft (15.2 m × 7.6 m). After the church was completed, attendance at services increased rapidly and by 1882 the congregation of 300 had outgrown the small church. So Prefontaine once again set to work to remodel and enlarge the edifice at a cost of $16,000. The rebuilding of the church was nearly total: Only the belfry and spire of the old church were used in the rebuilt church. The new church was considerably larger: Inside dimensions were 35 ft × 120 ft (11 m × 37 m), with seating for 700 parishioners. It was dedicated in May 1883. The priest's home was in the basement of the church, where he lived for more than 20 years.

=== Other work ===
In 1876 Prefontaine secured a contract from King County to care for sick people. He purchased an old soap factory at Fifth Avenue and Madison Street and persuaded the Sisters of Providence to come to Seattle and establish a hospital there.

In 1880 Prefontaine asked the Sisters of the Holy Names to set up Catholic education for the children of Seattle. He purchased a plot of land at Second Avenue and Seneca Street for $6,800, and in that year the order established the Holy Names Academy at that location. In his final years he served as chaplain at the academy, which is still in operation in Seattle.

== Final years ==
By 1900 Prefontaine's health was declining and in 1901 his niece Marie Rose Pauze came to live with him and tend to him. He began to acquire tastes of a more secular nature, such as fine cigars and good whiskey. He retired in 1903 and purchased a roomy, three-story house on Capitol Hill near Volunteer Park and enjoyed reading from his large library there.

Prefontaine was a secular priest, which meant that he had not taken a vow of poverty. Thus he was able to accumulate property and wealth. His niece once stated that he had a "sound head for business" and "expensive tastes". Over the years he bought and sold numerous properties and accumulated a comfortable fortune. When he died he left an estate worth over $33,000, which was a considerable sum of money in the early 20th century.

Prefontaine died in 1909 at the age of 70 years. A funeral, a solemn pontifical requiem mass celebrated by Bishop Edward John O'Dea of Seattle and Archbishop Alexander Christie of Oregon, was held at St. James Cathedral.

== Honors ==
=== Monsignor ===
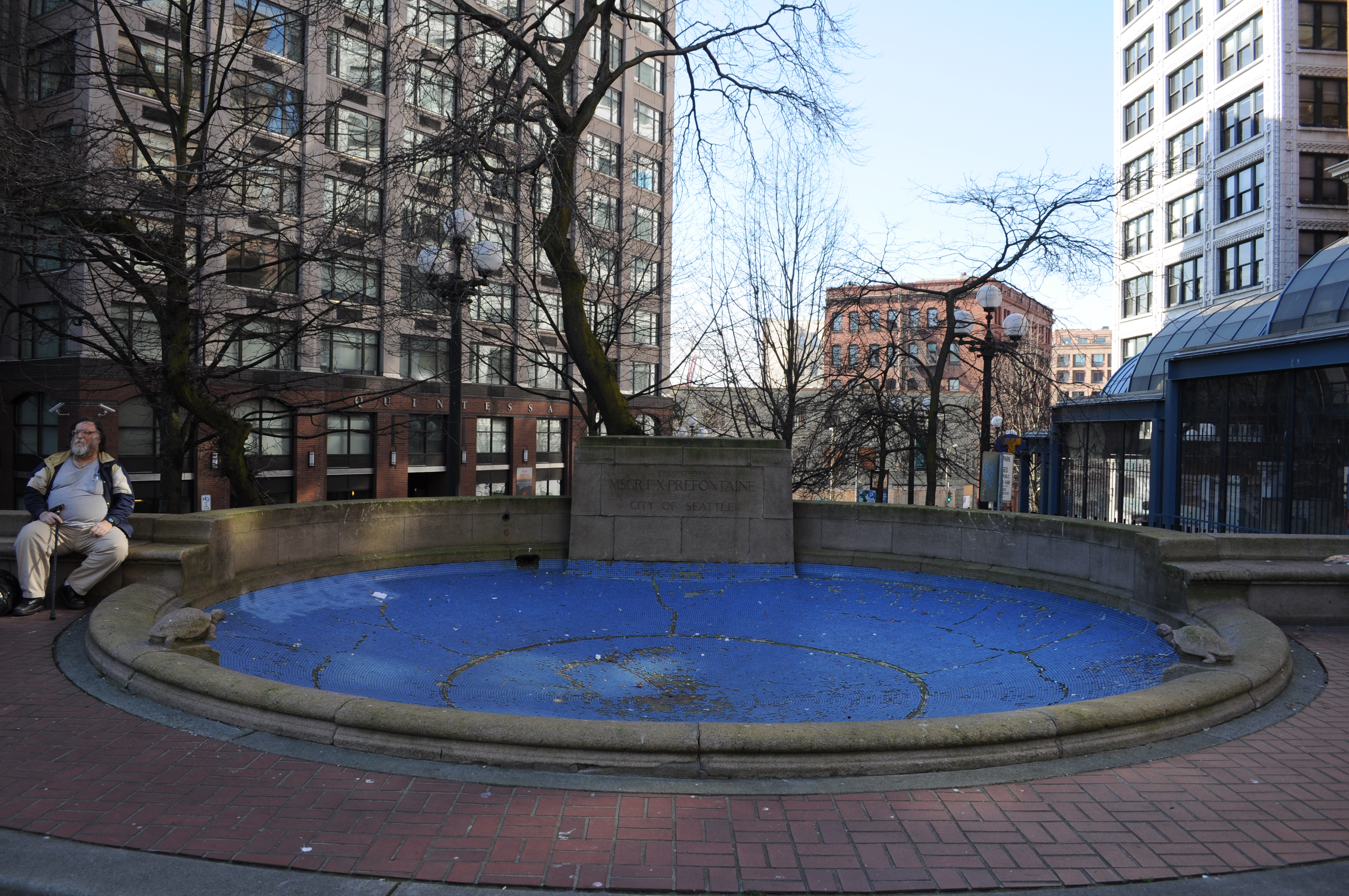
The Msgr. F.X. Prefontaine fountain at Third & Yesler in Seattle, in disrepair

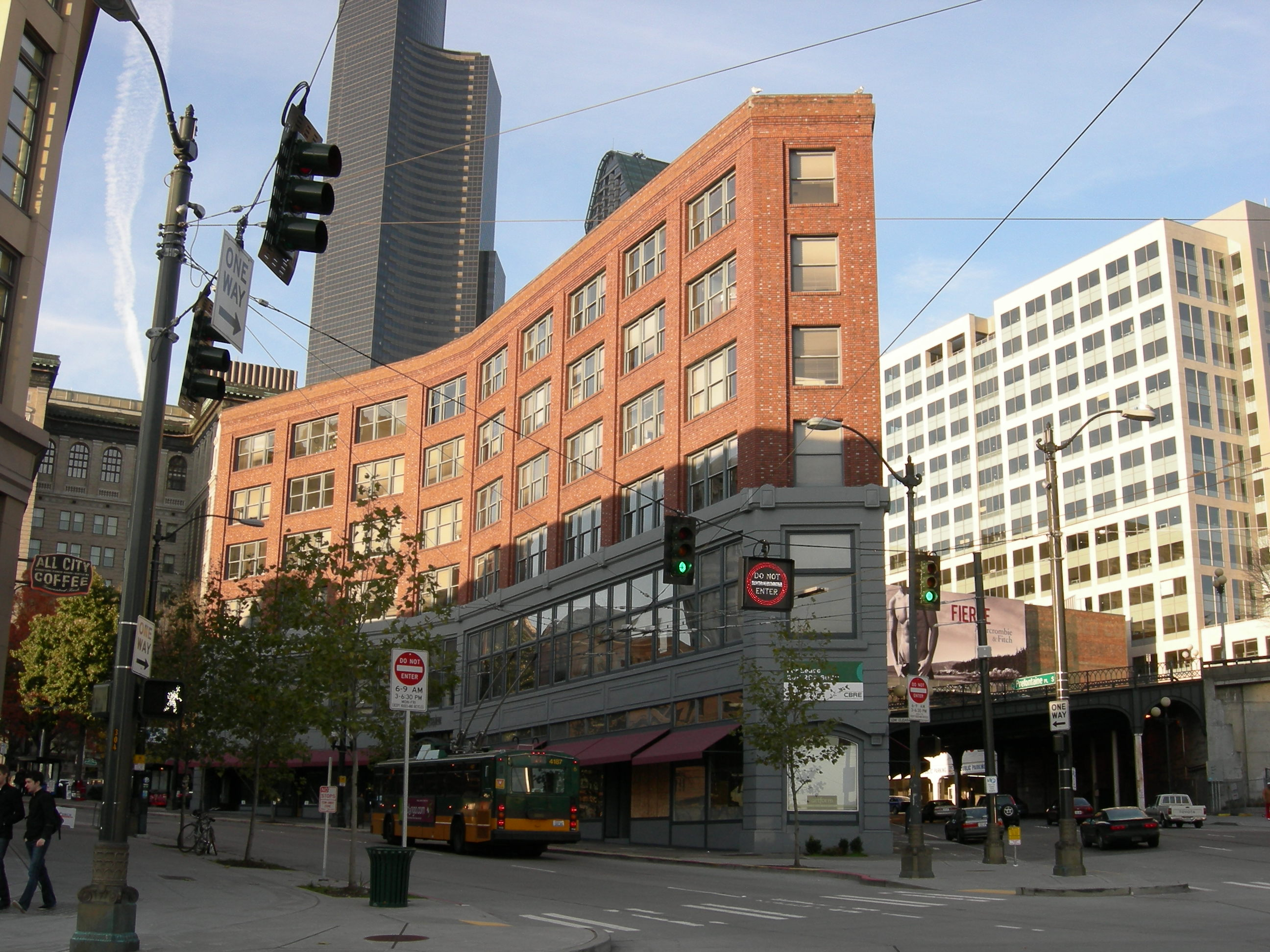
The Prefontaine Building in Seattle on Prefontaine Place S.

In July 1908 Pope Pius X conferred on Prefontaine the honorary degree of protonotary apostolic as a reward for his distinguished service in Seattle since 1869. He was invested with robes and the title of Monseigneur Member of the Papal Household (Monsignor) by Bishop Edward John O'Dea.

=== Namesakes ===
- In Seattle a short street named Prefontaine Place South on the site of his first church is named for Prefontaine.47°36′05″N 122°19′46″W
- On Prefontaine Place South stands the Prefontaine Building, a six-sided but nearly triangular building in the Beaux-Arts style, completed in 1909, the year of Prefontaine's death.
- At the intersection of Third Avenue and Yesler Way, which is at the north end of Prefontaine Place South, just about at the site of his first house, stands a fountain inscribed with the name Francis X. Prefontaine. In his will he left the sum of $5,000 to the city "for a fountain in a public square", although the fountain was not completed until 1925.47°36′07″N 122°19′51″W
