= Prefontaine Fountain =

Fountain in Seattle, Washington, U.S.

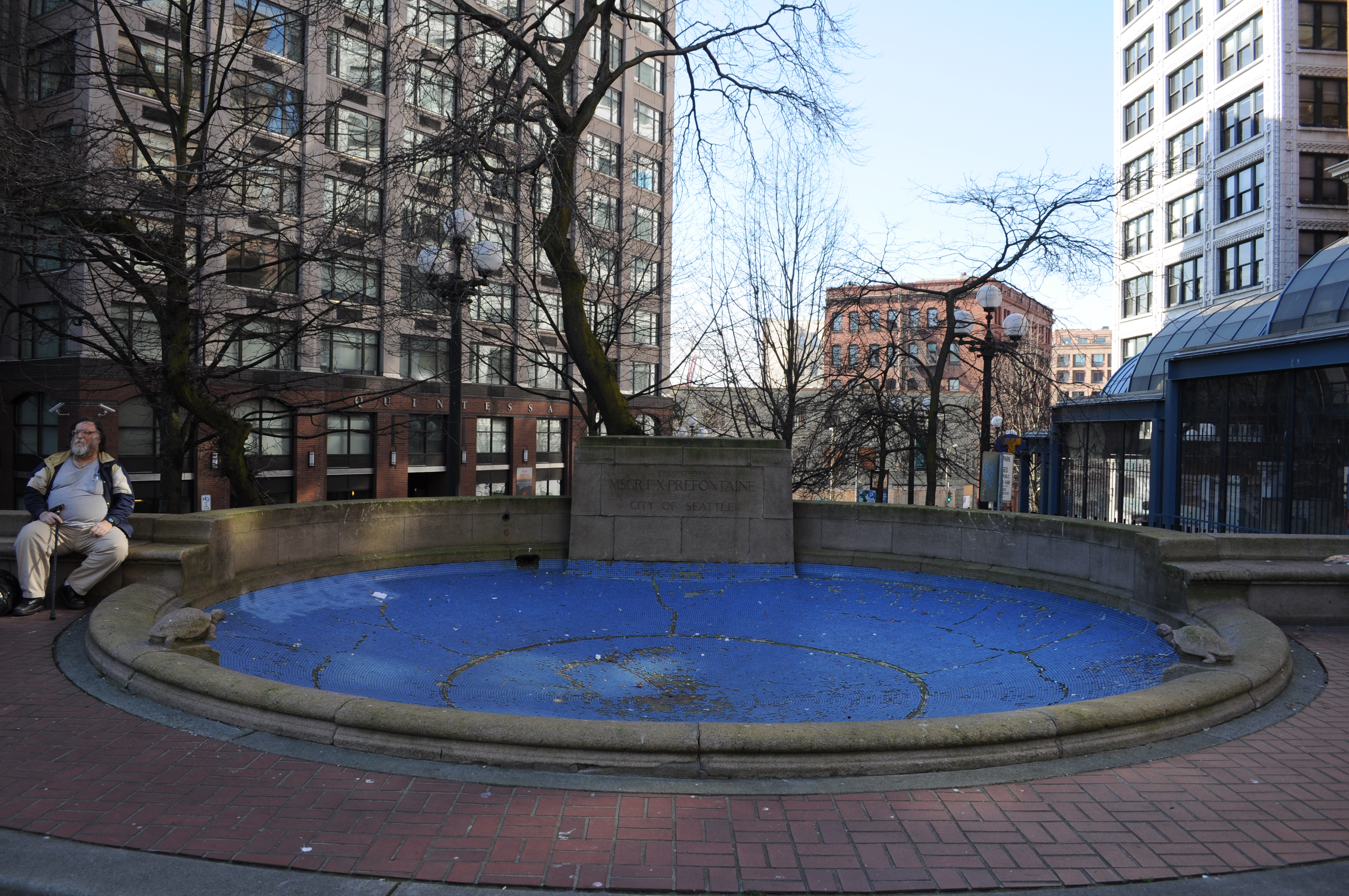
- The fountain in 2010
- Location: Seattle, Washington, United States; 47°36′07″N 122°19′51″W

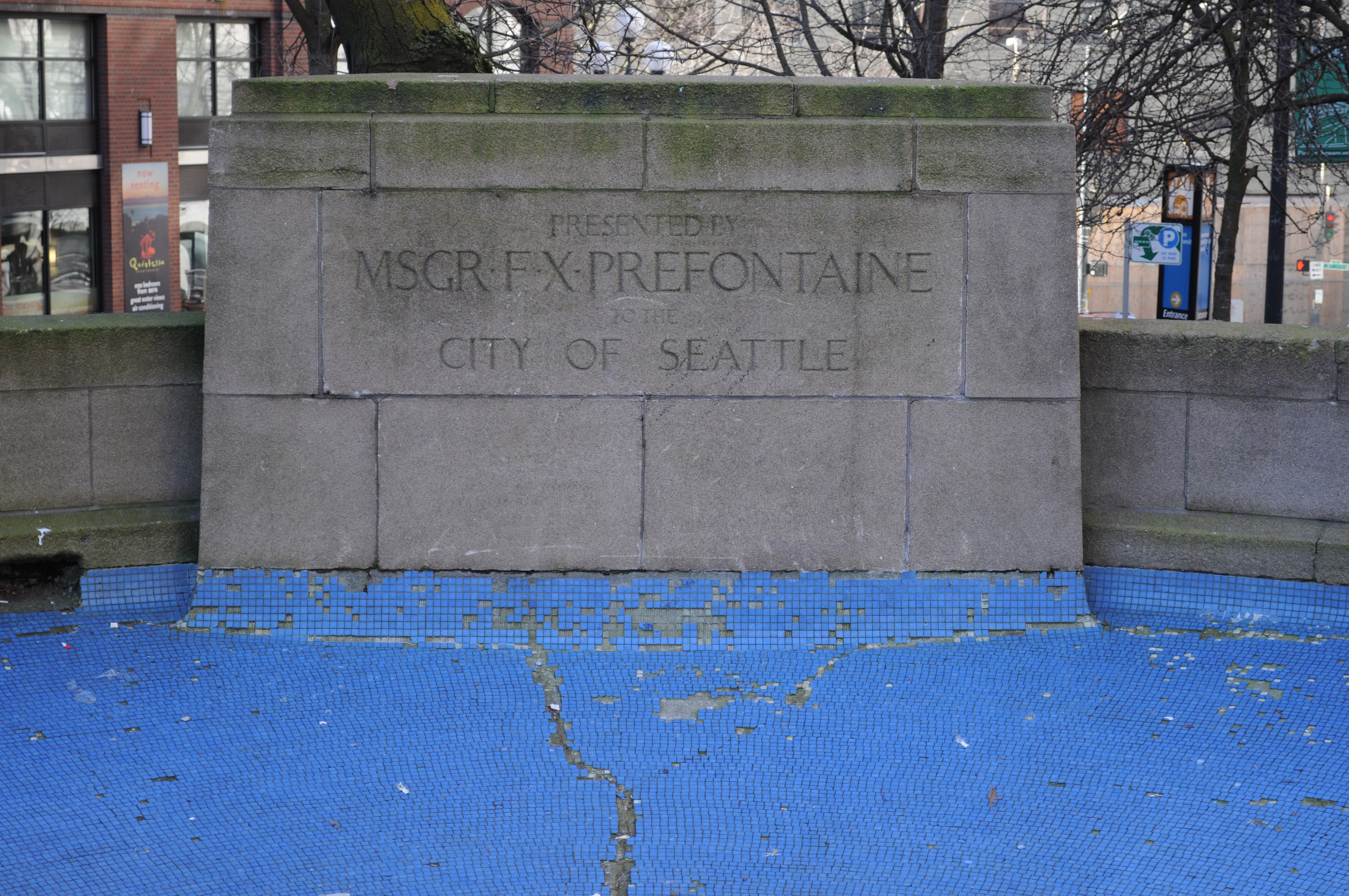
Inscription detail

Prefontaine Fountain is a fountain by Carl Frelinghuysen Gould, installed at Prefontaine Place, a small park in the Pioneer Square district of Seattle, Washington, near the intersection of 3rd Avenue and Yesler Way.

== Description ==
The circular basin and wall are concrete; the low basin rim has sculptures of turtles. Blue ceramic tiles line the fountain basin.

== History ==
The fountain is the city's oldest, completed in 1925, on land deeded to the city in 1912. The park and fountain were dedicated in June 1926 to the late Francis X. Prefontaine, a Catholic priest who built the city's first Catholic church and provided $5,000 for the fountain's construction. The park and fountain were rebuilt during construction of the Downtown Seattle Transit Tunnel and adjacent Pioneer Square station in the late 1980s, reopening in 1990. The fountain and sidewalk between it and Pioneer Square station have been fenced off since 2023.

== See also ==
- 1925 in art
