= Paul Schell =

Former mayor of Seattle

Paul E. S. Schell
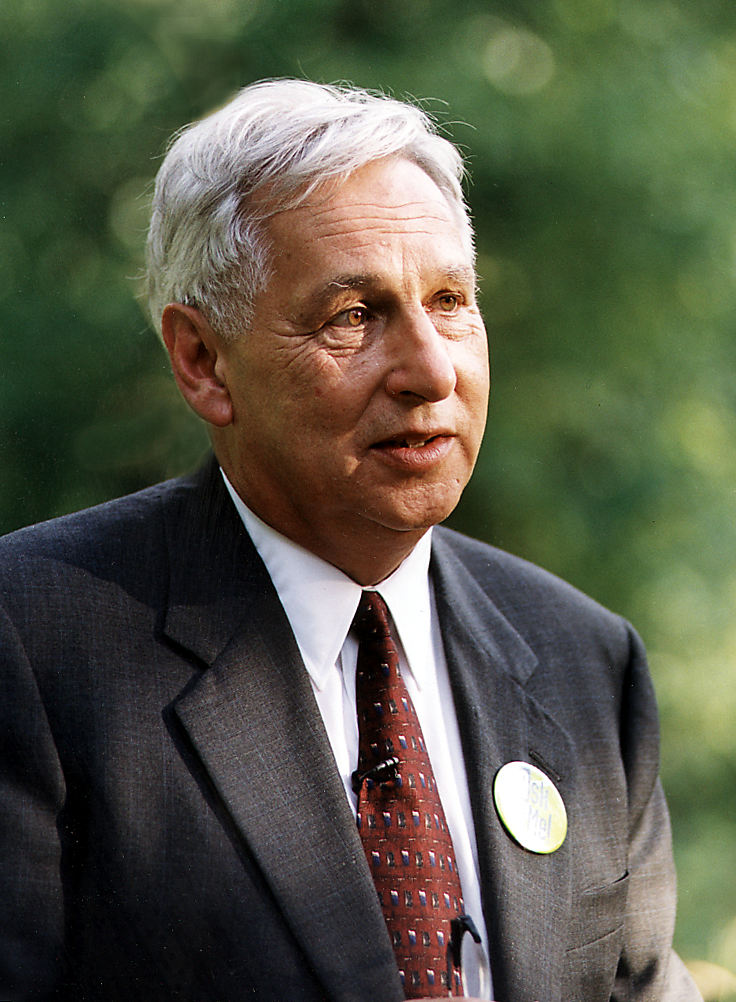

50th Mayor of Seattle
- In office January 1, 1998 – January 1, 2002
- Preceded by: Norm Rice
- Succeeded by: Greg Nickels

Personal details
- Born: Paul Ervin Schlachtenhaufen; October 8, 1937 Pomeroy, Iowa, US
- Died: July 27, 2014 (aged 76) Seattle, Washington, US
- Party: Democratic
- Spouse: Pam Schell
- Children: 1
- Education: University of Iowa; Columbia Law School
- Profession: Lawyer, urban planner, real estate developer

Paul Schell (born Paul Ervin Schlachtenhaufen; October 8, 1937 – July 27, 2014) was an American lawyer and politician who served as the 50th mayor of Seattle, Washington, from 1998 to 2002.

== Early life and education ==
The oldest of six children of Lutheran minister Ervin Schlachtenhaufen and nurse Gertrude Reiff Schlachtenhaufen, Paul Schell grew up in the small farm town of Pomeroy, Iowa, and graduated from Roosevelt High School in Des Moines, Iowa. He attended Wartburg College in Waverly, Iowa, where he played linebacker on the school football team. He also worked as a short-order cook and a fireman. Schell transferred to the University of Iowa where he completed his undergraduate degree. After graduation he went on to law school at Columbia University in New York. There he met his future wife, Pam, a registered nurse. They married on the day he graduated from law school — a double celebration scheduled so his father would have to pay for only one plane ticket.

== Career ==
In New York, Schell took a position at the Dewey Ballantine law firm, where he specialized in corporate finance. During his time there, he shortened his surname "Schlachtenhaufen" to "Schell," a change he described as "practical, not political," since the longer name wouldn't fit on computer punch cards used at the time. He worked as a summer law clerk in Portland. In 1967, Paul and Pam Schell moved to Seattle so he could take a job with the Perkins Coie law firm, practicing business and securities law. Their daughter Jamie joined the family in January 1971. After a few years with the Perkins firm, Schell left to help form a new law firm: Hillis, Schell, Phillips, Cairncross, Clark and Martin.

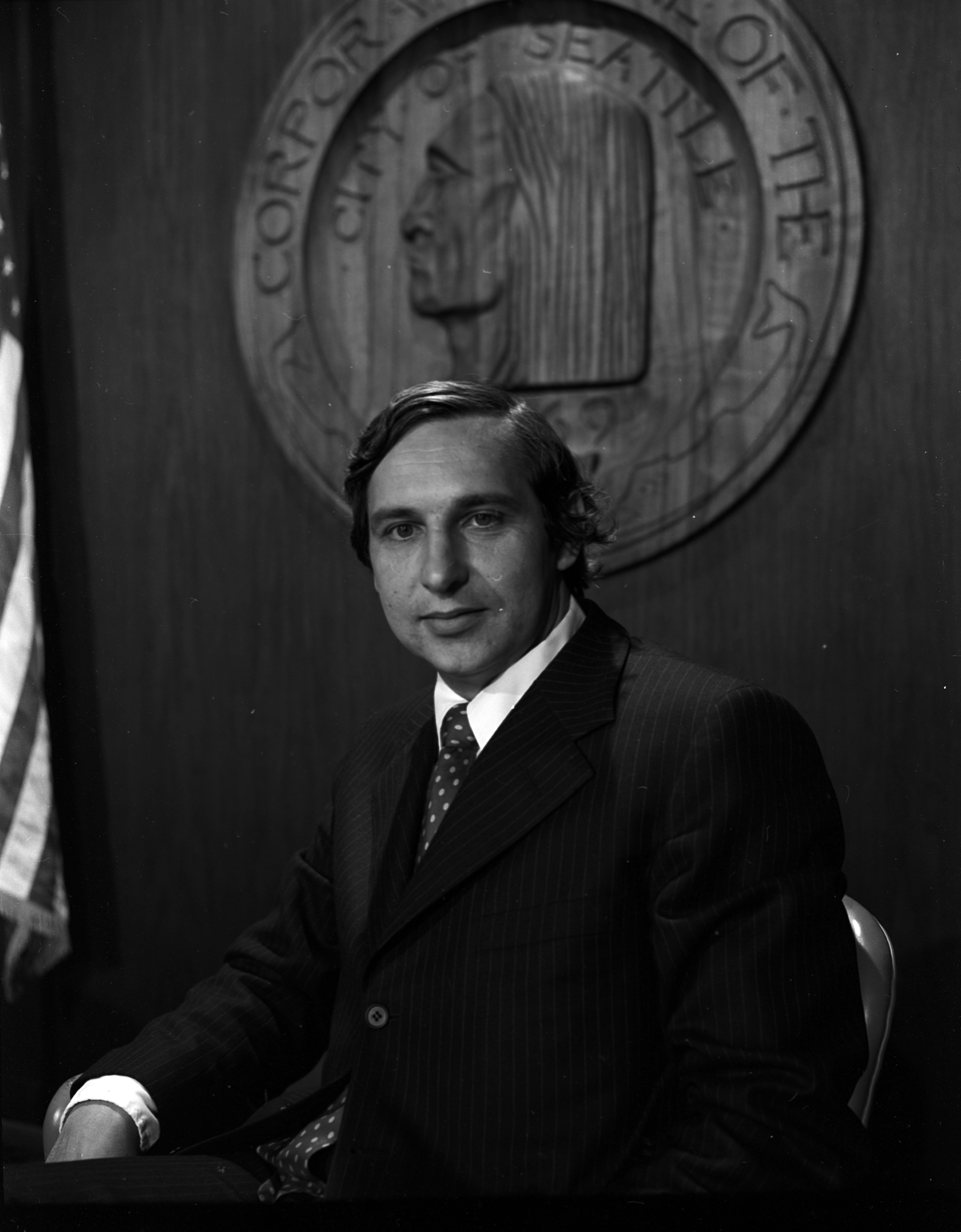
Schell in 1975, when he was director of the Department of Community Development

He joined other urban activists with Allied Arts of Seattle in the 1971 campaign to save the Pike Place Market from a proposed redevelopment. He left legal practice for civic affairs in 1973, when Mayor Wes Uhlman appointed him as director of the Seattle Department of Community Development. During his term with DCD, Schell oversaw the Market's preservation and rebuilding. As President of Allied Arts of Seattle, he led the successful effort to establish "One Percent for Art" in 1973 — with Seattle becoming one of the first cities to adopt a program to fund public art, which has since become the national standard. A member of the Democratic Party, Schell first ran for mayor in 1977, but lost to Charles Royer.

In 1979, he founded Cornerstone Development Company, serving as president 1979-87. Among projects located in Seattle, Tacoma, and Portland, Cornerstone developed Waterfront Place, a 6-block mixed-use project located on Seattle's central waterfront and incorporating six restored buildings, the new 22-story Watermark Tower, and the Alexis Hotel. In 1989, he developed the highly successful Inn at Langley, and later the Boatyard Inn, on Whidbey Island. He also played a key role in establishing the Whidbey Island Center for the Arts.

In 1989, Schell won election as Commissioner for the Port of Seattle. He became commission president in 1995. He accepted appointment as Dean of the University of Washington College of Architecture and Urban Planning, serving 1993-96. During that time he established the UW's Office of Sustainability and enhanced the Rome Studies Program. He also supported the initiation of the Real Estate program and the Center for Environment, Education, and Design Studies. Schell succeeded in being elected to serve a four-year term as mayor commencing January 1, 1998. During Schell's mayoral term, the City of Seattle built its new City Hall, the Seattle Justice Center, and several libraries, including the downtown library (via a $196 million Libraries for All bond campaign); invested $200 million in new parks and added six new community centers; rebuilt the Opera House and Seattle Symphony Hall, developed QWest Field, passed 26 new neighborhood plans, with resulting improvements via a $198 million levy for parks and the zoo. He also championed a $72 million effort that combined public and private dollars to renovate the Seattle Center Opera House and community centers, and initiated development of the Olympic Sculpture Park. In addition, he helped gain the transactions that resulted in Vulcan's development of South Lake Union. Mayor Schell also participated in the design charrette for the new Seattle-Tacoma International Airport Traffic Control Tower, commissioned in 2004.

Also during his term the WTO Meeting of 1999 took place, accompanied by widespread violent protests that gained national attention. It caused the resignation of Seattle police chief Norm Stamper; Stamper said that was a previously planned retirement. A particularly violent Mardi Gras celebration in 2001 left 20-year-old Kris Kime fatally injured; Police Chief Gil Kerlikowske ordered officers not to intervene. Arguably, the WTO meeting and the Mardi Gras violence played a role in Schell's coming in a distant third behind two other Democrats in the 2001 mayoral primary election, as did Boeing's relocation of its headquarters to Chicago.

It was the first time in over 65 years that an incumbent Seattle mayor had failed to survive a primary election. During the campaign, Schell was assaulted by a political opponent, a fringe mayoral candidate named James Garrett (a.k.a. Omari Tahir-Garrett). Garrett struck Schell in the face with a bullhorn he had been using to heckle the mayor, breaking bones under his right eye. Garrett was later convicted of second-degree assault and sentenced to 21 months in prison.

His mayoral predecessor Charles Royer assessed Schell's term in a January 2002 interview in The Seattle Times; "Paul is smart. Maybe the smartest mayor we've ever had. ... [I]n his one term, Paul Schell got more done than any first-term mayor has a right to expect. The former developer not only got the new City Hall complex started, he led an impressive effort to build a new and important downtown library, rebuild the branches and renovate and build the community centers. He led the effort to fund a record $200 million in new parks, rebuilt the aging Opera House, and in a stunning victory that future generations will celebrate, preserved the 90,000 acres of the pristine Cedar River watershed."

== Death ==
Schell died at the Swedish Medical Center in Seattle, Washington following heart surgery on July 27, 2014, at the age of 76.

== See also ==
- Timeline of Seattle, 1990s-2000s

Political offices
Preceded by Norm Rice	Mayor of Seattle; 1998–2001	Succeeded by Greg Nickels
