= Augustin-Magloire Blanchet =

French Canadian prelate

His Excellency, the Right Reverend Augustin-Magloire Blanchet
- Bishop of Nesqually
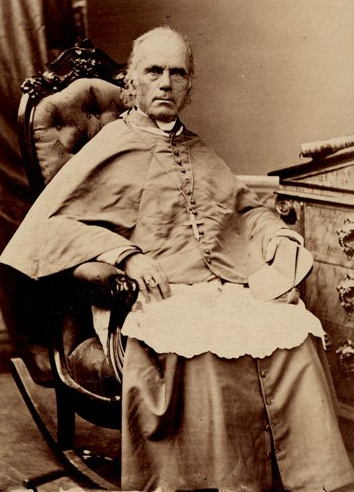
- Province: Oregon City
- Diocese: Nesqually
- Appointed: May 31, 1850
- Installed: July 28, 1850
- Term ended: July 14, 1879
- Predecessor: Inaugural bishop
- Successor: Egidius Junger
- Other posts: Bishop of Walla Walla, Oregon Country (1846–1850)

Orders
- Ordination: June 3, 1821 by Joseph-Octave Plessis
- Consecration: September 27, 1846 by Ignace Bourget

Personal details
- Born: 22 August 1797 [St-Pierre-de-La-Rivière-du-Sud, Lower Canada
- Died: 25 February 1887 (aged 89) Vancouver, Washington Territory, US
- Buried: Holyrood Catholic Cemetery, Shoreline, Washington
- Denomination: Catholic Church

Augustin Magloire Alexandre Blanchet (22 August 1797 – 25 February 1887) was a French Canadian prelate of the Catholic Church. He served as the first bishop of the now-defunct Diocese of Walla Walla and of the Diocese of Nesqually in present-day Washington.

Along with his elder brother and other fellow French Canadian missionaries, Blanchet established the Catholic Church presence in what later became Washington.

== Biography ==
=== Early life and priesthood ===
Augustin Blanchet was born on 23 August 1797 in the village of Saint-Pierre-de-La-Rivière-du-Sud, in what was then the British colony of Lower Canada. The younger brother of François Norbert Blanchet, Augustin Blanchet studied at Le Petit Séminaire de Québec and then at the Grand Seminary of Quebec.

Blanchet was ordained to the priesthood on 3 June 1821 for the Archdiocese of Quebec and held several church positions in Lower Canada, mainly around Montreal, and in the Cape Breton region what was then the British colony of Nova Scotia. He also served as chaplain for the Sisters of Providence in Montreal.

=== Bishop of Walla Walla ===
On 28 July 1846, while serving as a canon in Montreal, Blanchet was appointed bishop of the new Diocese of Walla Walla in the Oregon Country area of the Pacific Northwest. Francois Blanchet had set up a Catholic church presence there in 1838, serving a bishop of the Diocese of Oregon City. Augustin Blanchet was ordained bishop on 27 September 1846 by Archbishop Ignace Bourget at Saint-Jacques Cathedral in Montreal.

Blanchet left Montreal for Oregon Country on 4 March 1847 and arrived in Walla Walla on 5 September 1847. According to contemporary accounts, he was unhappy to discover that Walla Walla was no more than an trading post. Blanchet immediately ran into conflict with the Oblate order priests in the diocese performing missionary work. They refused Blanchet's efforts to assign them as parish priests. Blanchet also tried to claim an Oblate mission property that the order had received from a Native American tribe.

Described as an inflexible and arrogant leader, Blanchet quickly alienated most of the secular priests in his diocese. Many of these priests attempted to join the Jesuit and Oblate orders to escape his control. In response, Blanchet introduced rules to make these transfers more difficult and to steer seminarians away from the orders.

On 29 November 1847, two Protestant missionaries and eight other Americans were murdered by some members of the Cayuse tribe in what was later termed the Whitman massacre. The killers mistakenly believed that the missionaries had poisoned 200 tribal members while trying to treat them for measles. Despite attempts by the tribe to defuse the conflict, American settlers raised militias to punish the tribe. Local Protestants accused the Catholic clergy of being in league with the Cayuse. This animosity, along with warfare between the Army and the Cayuse and the failure of the diocese to grow, prompted the Vatican to move Blanchet to a new episcopal see in St. Paul in the Willamette Valley.

On 31 May 1850, Pope Pius IX established the Diocese of Nesqually (later spelled "Nisqually"), with its episcopal see in Vancouver, Washington, in what was by then known as the Oregon Territory, and named Blanchet bishop. Three years later, the Vatican dissolved the Diocese of Walla Walla and transferred much of its territory to the new Nesqually diocese.

=== Bishop of Nesqually ===
On 23 January 1851, Blanchet established the existing St. James Church built by his brother François and Modeste Demers at Fort Vancouver as his cathedral, renaming it St. James Cathedral. In 1853, the diocese became part of Washington Territory.

In 1868, Francis X. Prefontaine, a young priest and fellow Lower Canada native, requested Blanchet's permission to build a church building near Pioneer Square in Seattle to support the city's first Catholic parish, Our Lady of Good Help. Blanchet believed that Seattle was a lost cause, but nevertheless he gave Prefontaine permission to build a church there, on the condition that Prefontaine raised all the money. Prefontaine in 1869 opened Seattle's Catholic church.

=== Retirement and legacy ===
Pope Leo XIII accepted Blanchet's retirement as bishop of Nesqually on 23 December 1879, at age 82, and named him titular bishop of Ibora. He continued to live in the Nesqually area during his retirement. Augustin Blanchet died in Vancouver, Washington, on 25 February 1887.

Bishop Blanchet High School in Seattle's Green Lake neighborhood is named for Blanchet. In 1955, a priest conducting an exhumation of Blanchet's body to transport to a different burial site declared that it was incorrupt, or preserved by miraculous processes.

Catholic Church titles
Preceded by None (first bishop)	Bishop of Walla Walla; 1846–1850	Succeeded by None (defunct)
Preceded by None (first bishop)	Bishop of Nesqually; 1850–1879	Succeeded by Egidius Junger
