= Seattle Mardi Gras riot =

2001 riot in Washington, US

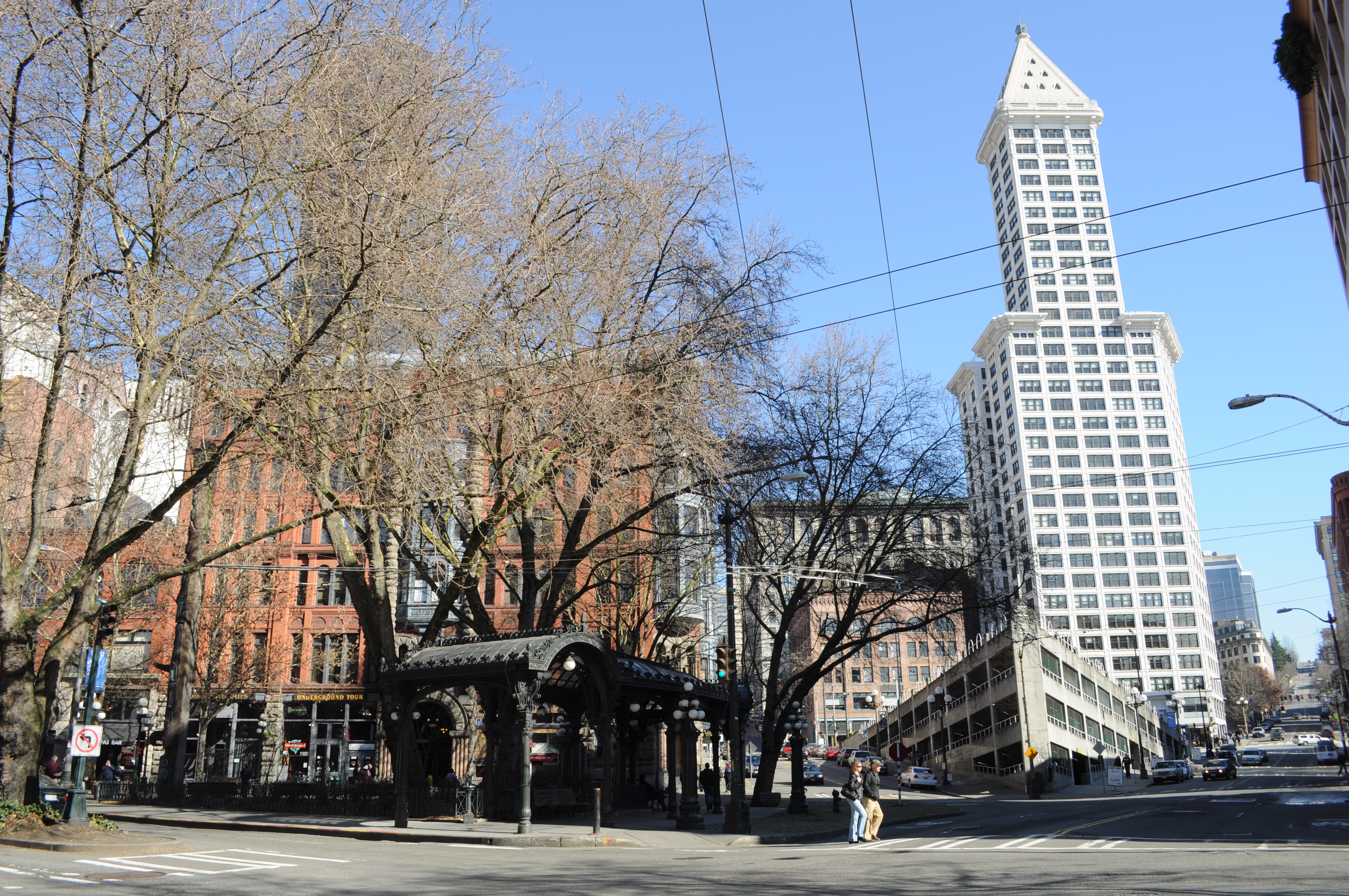
- Pioneer Square in February 2010, the site of the Mardi Gras riots.
- Date: February 27, 2001
- Location: Pioneer Square, Seattle, Washington, US

Casualties and losses
- Arrests: 100+ Injuries: ≈70; Deaths: 1

The Seattle Mardi Gras riot occurred on February 27, 2001, when disturbances broke out in the Pioneer Square neighborhood during Mardi Gras celebrations in Seattle, Washington, United States. There were numerous random attacks on revelers over a period of about three and a half hours. There were reports of widespread brawling, vandalism, and weapons being brandished.

Damage to local businesses exceeded $100,000. About 70 people were reported injured. Several women were sexually assaulted. One man, Kris Kime, died of injuries sustained during an attempt to assist a woman being brutalized.

It was Seattle's second serious rioting incident in a year and a half, the first being the Seattle WTO protests occurring during the 1999 World Trade Organization's Minister Level Conference On World Free Trade. Large crowds and some disturbances occurred during Mardi Gras leading up to the events of Fat Tuesday. The police department's lack of intervention during the disturbance led to allegations of police misconduct.

Responses during and after the event by both the Mayor and Chief of Police were met with intense scrutiny. The violence led to a moratorium on large Mardi Gras celebrations in the city and tarnished the neighborhood's reputation.

== Background ==
Pioneer Square was often described as the center of Seattle's nightlife at the time with its numerous bars and clubs. The neighborhood had been the site of Mardi Gras celebrations since 1977; with more than 90 civilians and 30 officers injured during disorders in 1979. Festivities on the Friday and Saturday leading up to 2001's Fat Tuesday were broken up by police with the city's bicycle patrol at the forefront of squashing festivities.

On Saturday, the Seattle Police Department estimated a total between 4,000 and 6,000 people gathered in the area after midnight. The crowd pelted the officers with rocks and bottles after a suspect was arrested for carrying a handgun. Windows were smashed, before the crowd was dispersed through the use of pepper spray, rubber bullets, and concussion grenades. The heavy-handed tactics led to complaints from event goers. Up to 2,000 people gathered in the neighborhood on Sunday evening with fewer incidents. Celebrations were also violent in Austin, Fresno, and Philadelphia that year.

== Fat Tuesday ==
Over 4,000 party goers initially filled the neighborhood and its bars on Tuesday evening. Police estimated large crowds began forming in the central plaza at 9:00 pm and eventually spilled into the surrounding streets. The celebrations included drinking, dancing, and women baring their breasts for beads. Throngs of men began groping the women as they exposed themselves. Police estimated that the crowd swelled to anywhere between 5,000 and 7,000 people as the evening continued.

Sporadic fighting broke out at about 10:40 pm. Police donned riot gear and formed lines but rarely entered the crowd. Some arrests were made at the periphery of the neighborhood's main square. Cars were vandalized and overturned. Small fires were set and the windows of business were shattered. Police were then notified that young men were brandishing handguns and other weapons towards people. By midnight, groups roved through the crowd randomly attacking people along the stretch of Yesler Way between First and Second Avenues. Paramedics were not able to reach some victims due to the lack of police control in the area.

As a group assaulted a female teenager, a bystander, Kris Kime, attempted to protect her, and the group beat him to death. Witnesses said Kime was struck and knocked to the ground as he tried to help the frightened woman who had fallen in the melee. Kime died of massive head injuries. About 70 others were reported injured with 2 suffering gunshot wounds. At 12:30 am, 25 to 30 young men advanced on a line of police. The police retreated while bottles and other debris were thrown.

A team of bicycle officers made a quick charge toward the crowd with pepper spray before retreating. Fighting escalated with little police interference until shots were fired from within the mass of people at 1:30 am. With the assistance of an armored vehicle, police advanced on the crowd with tear gas, pepper spray, and flashbangs. The crowds were dispersed shortly after 2:00 am.

== Reactions ==
The day after the riot, local newspapers carried a picture of a Black male wearing brass knuckles engaged in an assault which came to symbolize the riot. An editorial in The Stranger claimed the incident was racially motivated in self-defense and that much of the violence was directed at white American assailants. Some eyewitnesses said that most of the attackers were African American but that ethnicity was not a factor in who was victimized. According to the Seattle Weekly, police did not initially see the attacks as solely or even predominately racial motivated.

Racial issues overshadowed the sexual assaults that took place. One man was charged with forcibly fondling a woman. A photograph of a partially nude woman being groped by some two dozen men while lying topless and on her back won an award from the National Press Photographer Association despite not being previously published in a newspaper.

In the wake of the riot, Seattle mayor Paul Schell announced a moratorium on Mardi Gras celebrations in Seattle. Schell lost to Greg Nickels and Mark Sidran in the city's 2001 mayoral primary elections. King County Executive Ron Sims called the Mardi Gras riot and the protests at the 1999 World Trade Organization meeting "defining issues" in Schell's failed bid for reelection. Nickels made Kime's death a political issue in his campaign, saying the certificate of death would hang in his office should he become mayor. He kept the pledge upon taking the office. As mayor, Nickels retained Gil Kerlikowske as police chief despite criticism of the police department's inaction during the incident.

On the day after the Mardi Gras riot, Seattle experienced the 6.8 M_{w} Nisqually earthquake, the worst in 37 years. Its scale caused people to refocus their attention on earthquake recovery and away from the violence. Outside the Seattle area, the incidents attracted little media attention and have largely been forgotten. In 2011, local bars reattempted Mardi Gras celebrations in Pioneer Square. Smaller Mardi Gras events had been held but it was the first to consist of a collaboration between multiple establishments. Another group had considered organizing an event but the permitting process was too restrictive.

== Investigations and legal proceedings ==
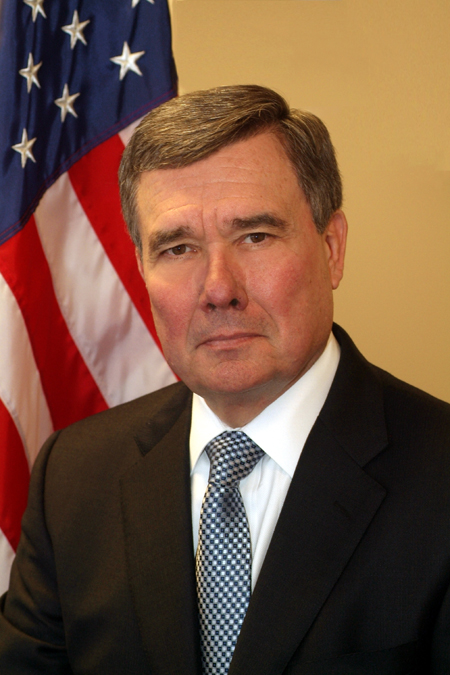
Gil Kerlikowske

Kerlikowske originally ordered the police at the scene not to intervene, instead maintaining a perimeter around the growing violence. The City of Seattle acknowledged that the police strategy during the incidents presented a public safety threat, and the City made an almost $2,000,000 settlement with Kime's family. Mayor Paul Schell appointed a three-member task force panel to investigate the cause of the riot. He instructed them not to discuss the lack of police intervention which the public had been concerned about. Initially task force meetings were closed to the public, but protest forced the city to open them to attendance. The Seattle Police Officers' Guild later voted no confidence in the chief, citing the Mardi Gras riot as one of the reasons.

That night, 21 were arrested. Dozens were later questioned by police after being identified through the use of videotape, photographs, and reports from eyewitnesses, but never charged. Investigations showed that roughly 75% of the over 100 suspects were black. Many of the suspects had criminal records and were believed to be affiliated with gangs.

The Black male photographed and videotaped wearing brass knuckles and beating people took a plea deal to three years in prison for assaults on a woman and two men. It ran concurrently with a nine-month sentence he received for rendering criminal assistance during a concert event three months later.

A 17-year-old, Jerell Thomas, was found guilty in the death of Kime after jurors saw video footage of Thomas hitting Kime in the head three times with a skateboard. He was also convicted of two counts of second-degree assault for attacking two other men with a skateboard. He originally received a 15-year sentence. His conviction was later overturned by a State's Supreme Court decision finding that assailants could not be found guilty of murder if the intent of the assault was not to take a life.

In 2006, Thomas avoided a new trial and plead guilty to second-degree manslaughter. He received a 10-year sentence. In December 2009, Thomas was released from prison early. Since that time, Thomas has been convicted in multiple domestic violence incidents. He is serving a five-year prison sentence for domestic violence assault and harassment with an additional firearms charge stemming from a 2011 incident with a girlfriend.
