= George Benson (Washington politician) =

American politician

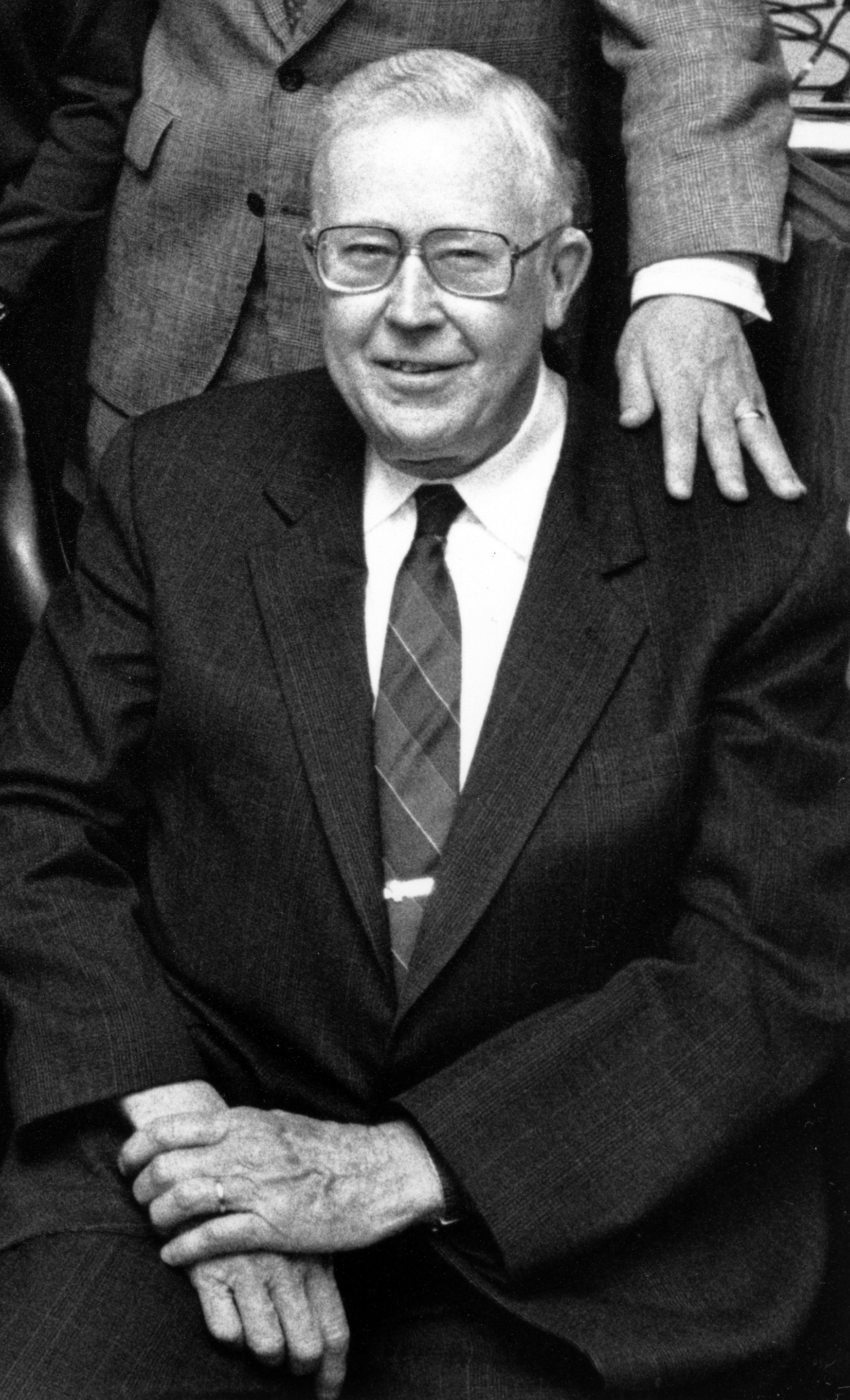
- Benson in 1991

President of the Seattle City Council
- In office January 3, 1992 – January 1, 1994
- Preceded by: Paul Kraabel
- Succeeded by: Jim Street

Member of the Seattle City Council from Position 4
- In office December 10, 1973 – January 1, 1994
- Preceded by: Liem Tuai
- Succeeded by: Jan Drago

Personal details
- Born: January 10, 1919 Minneapolis, Minnesota, United States
- Died: October 22, 2004 (aged 85) Edmonds, Washington, United States
- Party: Democratic
- Spouse: Evelyn (m. 1946; died 2002)
- Children: 2 daughters
- Education: University of Washington (BA)

Military service
- Allegiance: United States

George Benson (January 10, 1919 – October 22, 2004) was an American politician from Seattle. He was a five-time elected member of the Seattle City Council from 1973 to 1994. Benson advocated for expansion of public transit service in the city, with his major achievement being the creation of the Waterfront Streetcar, which was later named in his honor.

== Early life and education ==
Benson was born in Minnesota but moved to Seattle in 1938. He worked at pharmacies in the University District before registering for the University of Washington School of Pharmacy. Benson enlisted in the Navy in 1942, and due to his pharmacy training he was enlisted as a Hospital Apprentice First Class. He served in the Pacific Theater and was listed as inactive duty in February 1946 as an officer.

Benson returned to Seattle, immediately returned to school, and began working at the pharmacy. At his job, he met his wife, Evelyn, whom he married in June 1946. He graduated from the U.W. School of Pharmacy in 1947.

After graduating, the Bensons bought Mission Pharmacy in Capitol Hill, owning the business for 46 years. Before running for city council, Benson was active in various pharmacy conventions, including the National Association of Retail Druggists, where he was named Vice President. He also joined the Capitol Hill Community Council due to robberies in the neighborhood and became its president from 1969-1970.

== City council ==
=== Elections ===
Benson first ran for city council in 1972 against first-term incumbent Tim Hill. Hill was considered the "progressive" in the race because of his support of the group Citizens to Choose an Effective City Council, while Benson was seen as the "moderate" due to his business background and tough-on-crime policies. Both men advanced through the primary, with Hill defeating Benson in the general election, 54% to 46%.

The following year, Benson ran to fill the seat of Liem Tuai, who resigned to run for mayor. His primary opponent was Michael Ross, an African American activist and one-term state representative. Benson won the seat in the November general election, with over 60% of the vote, and took office on December 10, 1973. He would win his next three reelections in landslides: 1977 with 71%, 1981 with 75%, and in 1985 he ran unopposed. Benson faced his toughest reelection race in 1989 against Margaret Pageler, who was backed by the progressive group Vision Seattle, but he defeated Pageler in the general election by 707 votes.

He announced he would not seek reelection in 1993.

=== Tenure ===
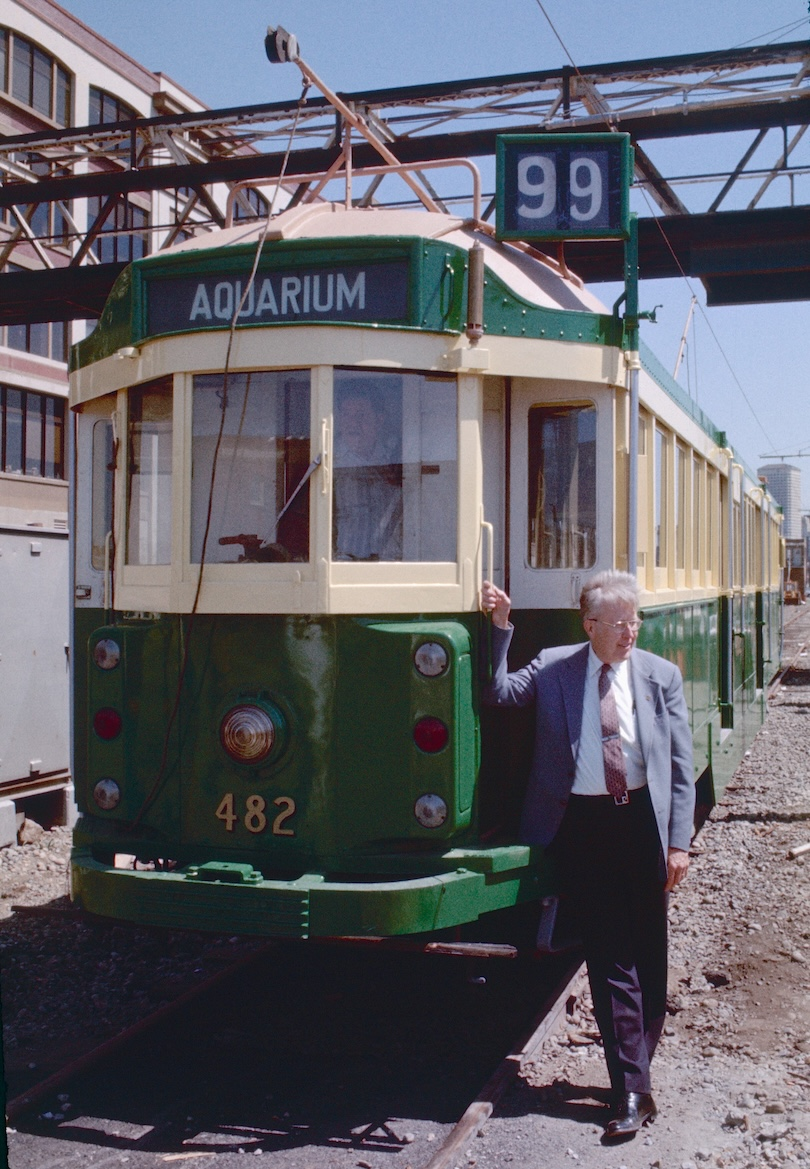
Benson posing with the first car of the Waterfront Streetcar line just after it was placed onto the tracks

Although viewed as "straight-laced" and conservative, Benson governed on progressive values. He showed support for LGBT people by hiring Cal Anderson, a gay political activist, as an office aid. Benson advocated for abortion rights and gun control, due to his experience as a pharmacist and as a business owner.

One of Benson's most significant achievements on the council was the creation of the Waterfront Streetcar, a streetcar service along already existing railroad tracks, which he first proposed in 1974. The 1.6-mile line opened in 1982. The cost to implement the service was much higher than had been estimated in 1974, and the proposal's detractors nicknamed it "Benson's folly", but once opened, it grew in popularity over time, and the route was extended in 1990, with a writer for Seattle magazine saying that it "became a much-loved fixture of Seattle life". On its 20th anniversary, the line was renamed the "George Benson Waterfront Streetcar Line". Benson also focused on other transportation issues, such as county-wide bus service in King County, construction of the Downtown Seattle Transit Tunnel, and preservation of the Seattle Center Monorail.

Benson was also pivotal in solving the growing trash and waste management issue plaguing Seattle in the 1980s. Through negotiations, Benson passed a 60-year contract with the city of Condon, Oregon, to use the city's landfill.

In his final two years in office, the council elected Benson the city council president until his retirement in January 1994.

== Personal life ==
Benson returned to working at Mission Pharmacy after he retired from the city council. He and his wife sold the pharmacy in 1994 after owning the business for 46 years. That same year, Benson was inducted into the Hall of Fame of the American Public Transit Association in 1997.

Evelyn died in 2002, with Benson dying two years later at a retirement home in Edmonds, Washington. Benson and his wife had two daughters.
