= Dolores Sibonga =

American lawyer and politician (1931–2026)

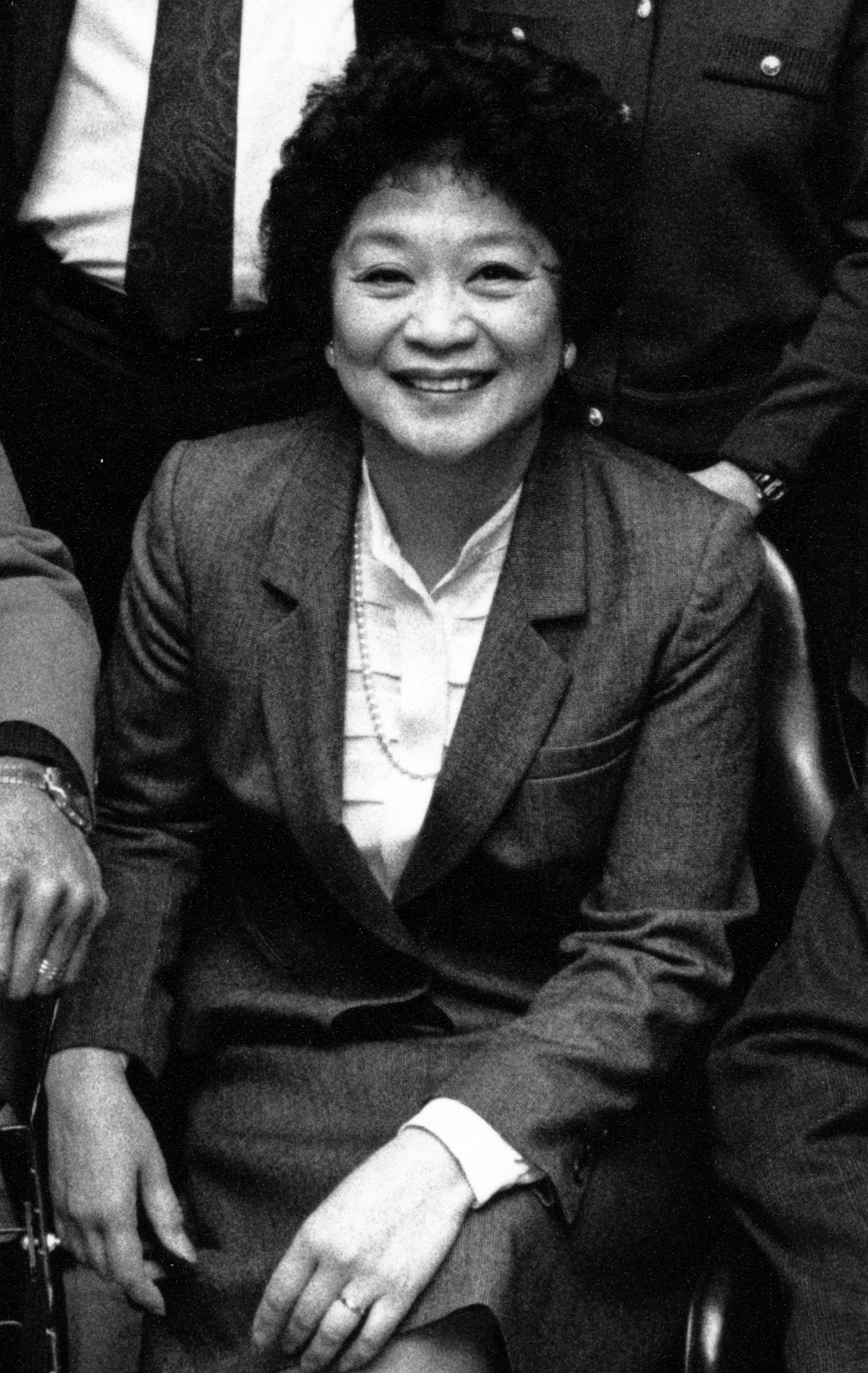
- Sibonga in 1991

Member of the Seattle City Council
- In office January 1, 1980 – January 1, 1992
- Preceded by: Tim Hill
- Succeeded by: Martha Choe
- Constituency: Position 9
- In office April 1978 – November 1978
- Preceded by: Phyllis Lamphere
- Succeeded by: Norm Rice
- Constituency: Position 1

Personal details
- Born: Dolores Dasalla Estigoy; August 12, 1931 Vashon, Washington, U.S.
- Died: September 16, 2026 (aged 95) Renton, Washington, U.S.
- Party: Democratic
- Spouse: Martin Sibonga
- Education: University of Washington (BA, JD)

Dolores Dasalla Sibonga (née Estigoy; August 12, 1931 – September 16, 2026) was an American journalist, lawyer and politician. She was the first Filipina-American woman to become a lawyer in the state of Washington. In 1978, she became the first woman from a minority to serve on the Seattle City Council, when she was appointed to fill the vacancy left by Phyllis Lamphere; she chose not to run to fill that seat for a full term. In 1979, Sibonga was elected to city council and served until 1992 when she chose not to run for reelection.

== Early life and journalism career ==
Sibonga was born on August 12, 1931, in Vashon, and grew up in the Chinatown–International District, Seattle. She worked in her parents' restaurant and pool hall, the Estigoy Cafe. Sibonga stated that her mother encouraged her to pursue a career in journalism because "... she had so much respect for Victor Velasco, the longtime editor and publisher of the Filipino Forum". She earned her journalism degree from the University of Washington in 1952.

After college, Sibonga worked in radio and television in Spokane and Seattle. She produced documentaries for new organizations including KOMO-TV, earning her an Emmy nomination. After Velasco died in a fire at a cannery in 1968, Sibonga and her husband Martin purchased the Filipino Forum. From 1977 to 1978, they ran the monthly newspaper, supporting the civil rights movement, often militant, and urged people to take part in "united minority action".

== Legal career ==
Sibonga's husband suggested she take a summer class at the University of Washington aimed at assisting ethnic minorities interested in going to law school. In 1970, Sibonga enrolled in law school at UW after her husband lost his job as an illustrator at Boeing. Sibonga graduated and in 1973, became the first Filipina American lawyer admitted to the Washington State Bar. Sibonga initially worked as a defense attorney before becoming a legislative analyst for the King County Council. She then worked in the King County Office of Human Rights before working at the State Human Rights Department as a deputy secretary.

== Career on the Seattle city council ==
Sibonga being sworn in as Seattle City Councilmember, 1978

In 1978, Sibonga achieved another historical first by becoming the first woman from a minority to serve on the Seattle City Council when she was appointed to fill the seat vacated by Phyllis Lamphere. She later chose not to run to serve the remainder of the term, instead running in the 1979 election to replace outgoing councilmember Tim Hill.

=== Elections ===
In the September 1979 primary election, Sibonga won with 40% of the vote, with Seattle police officer, Bob Moffett, coming in second with 23%. In the November general election Sibonga defeated Moffett, 55% to 45%, becoming the first woman from a minority elected to the council. Sibonga ran for reelection in 1983 and won the general election in a landslide against Frank Doolittle, the chairman of the Board of Public Works, 64% to 36%. In 1987, she defeated future council member Margaret Pageler 57% to 43%.

Sibonga ran in the 1989 Seattle mayoral election, which she lost. Afterwards, her bid for council presidency failed, and she chose not to run for reelection in 1992.

=== Tenure ===
Sibonga chaired four committees over her twelve-year tenure; Personnel and Property Management (1978, 1980–1981), Parks and Community Resources (1982–1983, 1988–1989), Finance (1984–1987, 1990–1991), and Labor (1986–1987). Sibonga introduced legislation to provide reparations to five city employees fired during World War II because of their Japanese ancestry. The ordinance passed in 1984, providing $5,000 to the employees. Sibonga was the lone "no" vote on a plan for tax breaks for a new basketball stadium after the Seattle SuperSonics threatened to leave the city. Plans for the new stadium were scrapped, and the Sonics eventually left Seattle. While she was chair of the parks committee, it studied potential redesigns of Seattle Center, which included an expensive and unpopular proposal from Disney consultants. She was a critic of the Disney plan, and worked to maintain minimal changes to the area.

== Post city council career and death ==
Sibonga returned to practicing law after leaving the city council. In 1998, she was appointed to a two-year term on the Horse Racing Commission immediately followed by a five-year term on the Human Rights Commission.

In 2023, she earned the International Examiner Lifetime Achievement Award.

Sibonga died in her sleep at a hospice facility in Renton, Washington, on September 16, 2026, at the age of 95.

== See also ==
- List of first women lawyers and judges in Washington
