= Tim Hill (politician) =

American politician

- Hill in 1967

4th King County Executive
- In office January 1, 1986 – January 3, 1994
- Preceded by: Randy Revelle
- Succeeded by: Gary Locke

Comptroller of Seattle
- In office January 1, 1980 – January 1, 1986
- Preceded by: Edward L. Kidd
- Succeeded by: Norward J. Brooks

Member of the Seattle City Council for the 9th Position
- In office January 1, 1968 – January 1, 1980
- Preceded by: Clarence F. Massart
- Succeeded by: Dolores Sibonga

Member of the Washington House of Representatives from the 44th district
- In office January 9, 1967 – December 1, 1967
- Preceded by: Arnie Bergh
- Succeeded by: Lon F. Backman

Personal details
- Born: Timothy Henry Hill; August 23, 1936 (age 90) Paterson, New Jersey, U.S.
- Party: Republican
- Spouse: Margot David (m. 1962)
- Children: 3
- Education: Whitman College (BA); University of Washington (JD)
- Profession: Lawyer

Timothy Henry Hill (born August 23, 1936) is an American lawyer and politician who has held numerous public offices in Washington, including two terms as King County Executive. He also served several years on the Seattle City Council, and in the Washington House of Representatives. Hill also lost numerous high-profile elections, including a 1992 race for United States Senate. He is a liberal Republican who, in 2006, referred to the contemporary Republican Party as being "far too conservative". Hill lives with his wife, Margot, in Seattle.

== Early life ==
Hill was born on August 23, 1936, in Paterson, New Jersey. His father was Henry C. Hill, an engineer at Curtiss-Wright who assisted with the design of the engine of the Boeing B-17, and his mother was Eleanor Sanford Hill. Hill was the second eldest of four siblings: Nancy, Don and Hunter. Due to his father’s work, the family spent two years in Pasadena, California, before moving to Seattle, Washington, in 1948. Hill studied at West Seattle High School and then attended Whitman College where, influenced by his roommate, he majored in political science. In 1958, he began studying at the University of Washington School of Law but dropped out twice, the first time to work for Boeing for six months and the second to travel around the Middle East for nine months in a Fiat. He rejoined the law school, becoming president of the student bar association and graduating in 1963.

Hill met Margot David, a nurse at Doctor's Hospital, on a blind date in 1961 and the couple married the following year. They had three children: Margaret, Robert and John.

== Political career ==
Hill joined the King County prosecutor's office, becoming a deputy prosecutor to Charles O. Carroll. He decided to run for the Washington House of Representatives in 1966 for a vacant seat in the 44th district and was fired from his job. Running as a Republican, he won the election and served one term.

After his term ended, he was approached by Choose an Effective City Council (CHECC), a group of young professionals looking to encourage change in the city's local government, to run for a seat on the Seattle City Council in 1967. He won his election, beating the incumbent Clarence F. Massart, and flipped the council to a reformist majority along with Phyllis Lamphere and Sam Smith. He was appointed as chair of the finance and budget committee.
