= Kelabe Tewolde =

American politician

Member-elect of the Washington House of Representatives from the 37th district
- Assuming office January 2027
- Succeeding: Sharon Tomiko Santos

Personal details
- Party: Democratic

Kelabe Tewolde is an American politician. A member of the Democratic Party, he is the member-elect for the 37th district of the Washington House of Representatives.
