= Norm Rice =

American politician

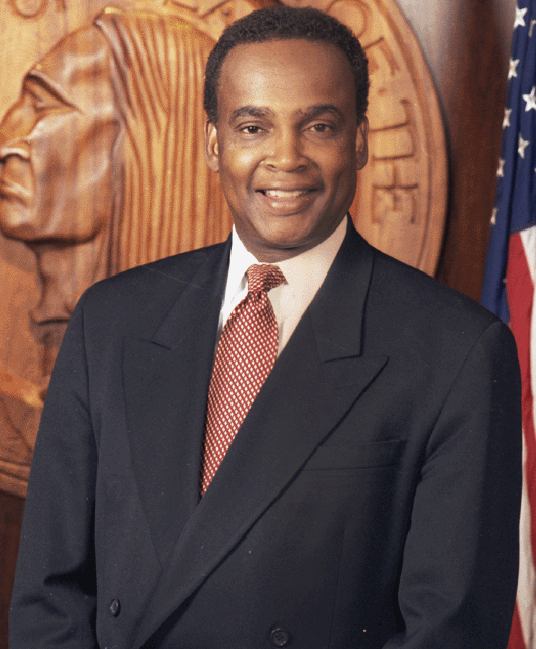
- Rice in 1993

49th Mayor of Seattle
- In office January 1, 1990 – January 1, 1998
- Preceded by: Charles Royer
- Succeeded by: Paul Schell

53rd President of the United States Conference of Mayors
- In office 1995–1996
- Preceded by: Victor Ashe
- Succeeded by: Richard Daley

President of the Seattle City Council
- In office January 3, 1984 – January 3, 1986
- Preceded by: Jeanette Williams
- Succeeded by: Sam Smith

Member of the Seattle City Council for Position One
- In office November 1978 – January 1, 1990
- Preceded by: Dolores Sibonga
- Succeeded by: Sue Donaldson

Personal details
- Born: Norman Blann Rice; May 4, 1943 (age 83) Denver, Colorado, U.S.
- Party: Democratic
- Spouse: Constance Williams
- Education: Highline College (AA); University of Washington, Seattle (BA, MPA)

Norman Blann Rice (born May 4, 1943) is an American politician who served as the 49th mayor of Seattle, Washington, serving two terms from 1990 to 1997. Rice was Seattle's first elected African-American mayor.

== Early life and education ==
Norman B. Rice was born on May 4, 1943, in Denver, Colorado, and was the youngest son of Irene Hazel Johnson and Otha Patrick Rice. He graduated from Manual High School in 1961 and then attended University of Colorado Boulder. Rice left University of Colorado after two years because of the segregated housing and meal facilities, as well as the work load.

Rice moved to Seattle in 1969 and attended Highline College, graduating with an Associate degree in 1970. He then attended and graduated from the University of Washington in Seattle, earning a bachelor's degree in communications and a Master of Public Administration from the university's Daniel J. Evans School of Public Affairs. He became a member of Alpha Phi Alpha fraternity.

Before entering city government, Rice worked as a reporter at KOMO-TV News and KIXI radio. He served as Assistant Director of the Seattle Urban League. He next worked as Executive Assistant and Director of Government Services for the Puget Sound Council of Governments.

== Political life ==
=== Seattle City Council ===
Rice was first elected to the Seattle City Council in 1978 to fill a vacancy left by Phyllis Lamphere, who took a position at the U.S. Economic Development Agency. He was reelected in 1979, 1983, and 1987, serving eleven years in all. He served as chair of the Energy Committee, Finance and Budget Committee, and the Public Safety Committee, and was Council President for one term.

Rice facilitated the development of more equitable cost allocation and rate design procedures for Seattle City Light as part of his work on the Energy Committee. His accomplishments on the Finance and Budget Committee included the passage of the Women and Minority Business Enterprise Ordinance, and from 1982 to 1987, the elimination of City investments in firms doing business in apartheid-era South Africa.

As chair of the Public Safety Committee, Rice worked to add 100 officers to the police force, secure funding for school safety officers, and sponsored the creation of neighborhood anti-crime teams.

=== Seattle Mayor ===
==== Elections ====
Rice ran for mayor in 1985, but lost to Charles Royer, 86,811 to 49,700.

Rice ran again in 1989 in a field of 13 candidates. He decided to run because of other candidates silence or support of an anti-busing initiative. In the September primary, Rice came in second with 20% of the vote and moved on to the general election with Seattle City Attorney Doug Jewett, who came in first with 24%. Jewett made the anti busing Initiative a central issue of his campaign, while Rice said busing was a "key issue" but also focused on crime and city growth. In the November general election, Rice defeated Jewett, 99,699 to 75,446, and became Seattle's first black mayor.

Rice ran for re-election in 1993, and faced six challengers in the primary. In the September primary, Rice came in first, with 57% of the vote, and advanced to the general election with busineness man David Stern, who earned 26% of the vote. In the general election, Stern focused his campaign on the rise of crime during Rice's tenure, while Rice touted his anti-violence program to address the root causes of crime. In the November general election, Rice defeated Stern in a landslide, 119,695 votes to 63,461.

==== Tenure ====
Due to his personality and demeanor, Rice was known as "Mayor Nice." In 1995, Rice served as a committee member for the Rudy Bruner Award for Urban Excellence. He also served as President of the U.S. Conference of Mayors.

Upon taking office, Rice convened a citywide education summit to address the state of Seattle Public Schools. Over 2,500 attended 32 meetings, which led to the 1990 Families and Education levy. Rice also served on the Governor's Council on Education Reform and Funding, and pushed for new policies and programs to benefit Washington students.

During the technology boom of the 1990s, Rice led the rejuvenation of Seattle's downtown. Rice championed a project to revive downtown by purchasing a garage adjacent to Pacific Place mall. The purchase was made using a $24 million loan from the federal Department of Housing and Urban Development. However, the mayor's office was accused of misleading HUD about how the funds were being used, but HUD later found no "criminal violation." This complaint likely played a role in his failed bid to become HUD Secretary under Bill Clinton.

In 1996, Rice ran in the Democratic primary of the 1996 Washington gubernatorial election, but he was defeated by then-King County Executive Gary Locke.

In 1997, Rice made a guest appearance as himself on an episode of Frasier, titled "The 1000th Show."

== Civic life ==
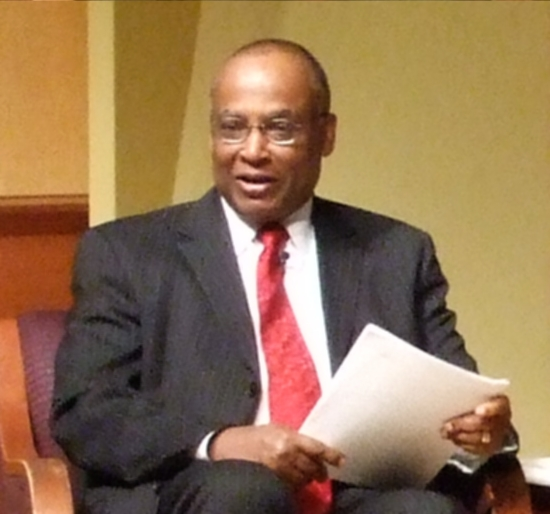
Rice at the University of Washington in November 2008

Rice was CEO and then president of the Federal Home Loan Bank of Seattle from 1998 to 2004.

In June 2009, Rice was named CEO of the non-profit Seattle Foundation, serving in that post until December, 2013. In December 2010, he was nominated as one of 30 members for a two-year appointment in the White House Council for Community Solutions, created by Executive Order of President Barack Obama.

In 2011, Rice was serving a three-year term as a Distinguished Practitioner-in-Residence at the University of Washington’s Daniel J. Evans School of Public Affairs and lead the project Civic Engagement in the 21st Century.

== Personal life ==
In 1975, he married Dr. Constance Williams at Mt. Zion Baptist Church. He has one son and one grandson.

== Honors and legacy ==
Rice has been awarded honorary degrees by Cornish College of the Arts, Seattle University, the University of Puget Sound, and Whitman College.

Rice has also received the following awards:

- Municipal League of King County’s James R. Ellis Regional Leadership Award (with John Stanton)
- The American Jewish Federation’s Human Relations Award (with wife Constance Rice)
- National Neighborhood Coalition’s National Award for Leadership on Behalf of Neighborhoods
- King County Chapter of the YWCA’s Isabel Coleman Pierce Award
- Washington Council on Crime and Delinquency’s Mark F. Cooper Leadership Award
- American Association of Community College Students’ Outstanding Alumni Award

== See also ==
- Timeline of Seattle, 1990s

Political offices
Preceded by Charles Royer	Mayor of Seattle; 1990–1997	Succeeded by Paul Schell
