= Sharon Tomiko Santos =

American politician from Washington

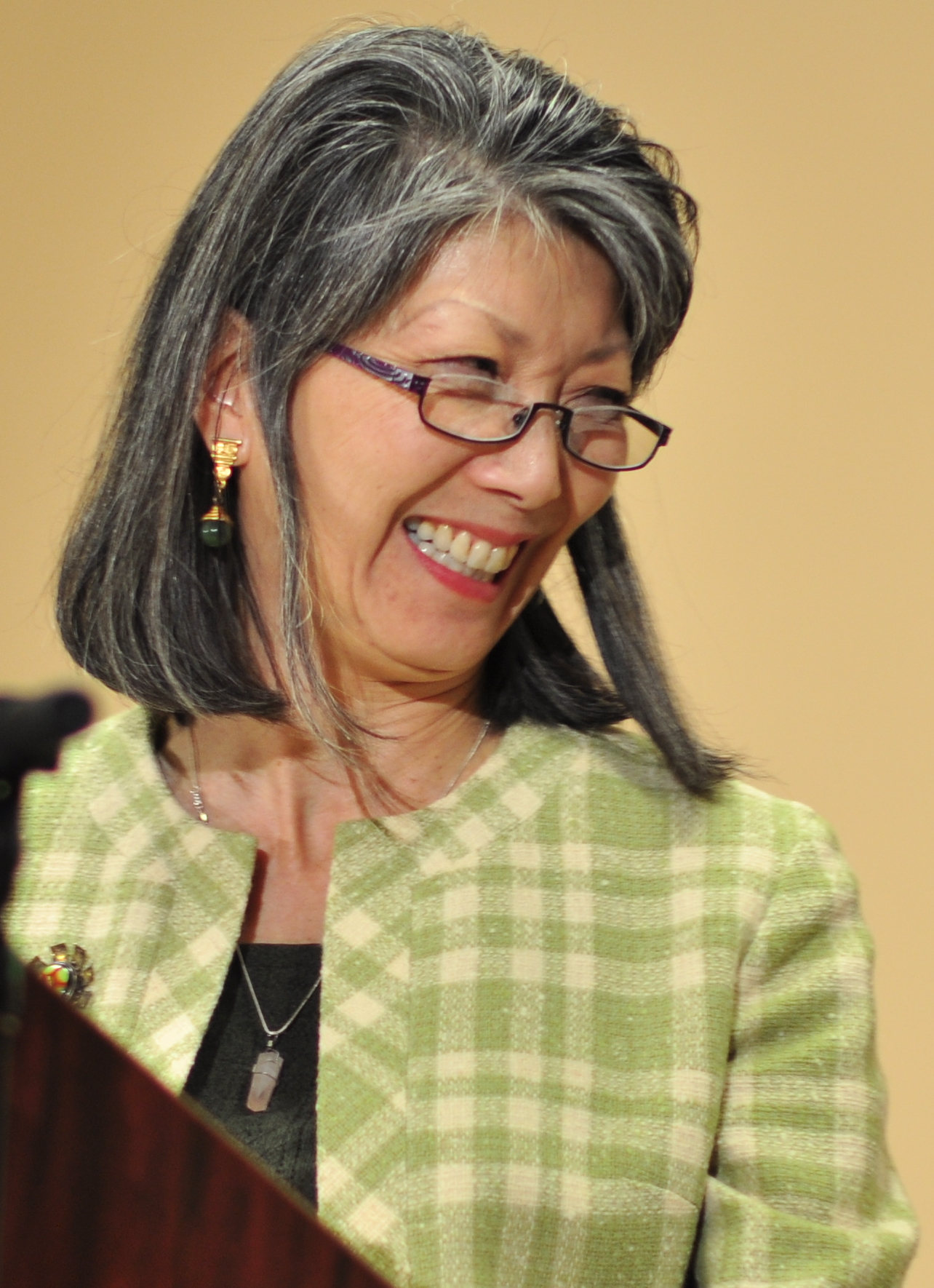

Member of the Washington House of Representatives from the 37th district
- Incumbent
- Assumed office January 11, 1999 Serving with Chipalo Street
- Preceded by: Dawn Mason
- Succeeded by: Kelabe Tewolde (elect)

Personal details
- Born: Sharon Tomiko Miyake; July 5, 1961 (age 65) San Francisco, California
- Party: Democratic
- Spouse: Bob Santos (deceased)
- Education: Evergreen State College (BA); Northeastern University (MA)

Sharon Tomiko Santos (née Miyake, Japanese: 三宅 富子, born July 5, 1961) is an American politician serving as a member of the Washington House of Representatives for the 37th legislative district.

== Early life and education ==
Santos was born in San Francisco, California. Santos earned a bachelor's degree from Evergreen State College and earned a master's degree from Northeastern University.

== Career ==
Santos was first elected to the Washington House of Representatives in 1998, the first Japanese-American woman to serve in a state legislature on the mainland. She serves on the Education; Finance; Insurance, Financial Services & Consumer Protection; and Rules committees.

In 2019, Santos sponsored legislation to amend Washington's wrongful death law to remove a requirement (dating to 1909) that family members who sue on behalf of a decreased victim live in the U.S. and be economically dependent on the victim. Bob Hasegawa sponsored the companion bill in the state Senate. The 1909 law, whose passage was attributed to early 20th-century xenophobia, gained attention in 2015, after five people were killed, and 69 injured, when a "duck tour" vehicle crashed into the Aurora Bridge, striking a bus carrying international students. The bill passed the Legislature.

== Personal life ==
Santos lives in the Rainier Beach neighborhood of Seattle. She was married to activist Bob Santos until his death in 2016.
