= Waterfront Streetcar =

Former heritage streetcar line in Seattle, Washington

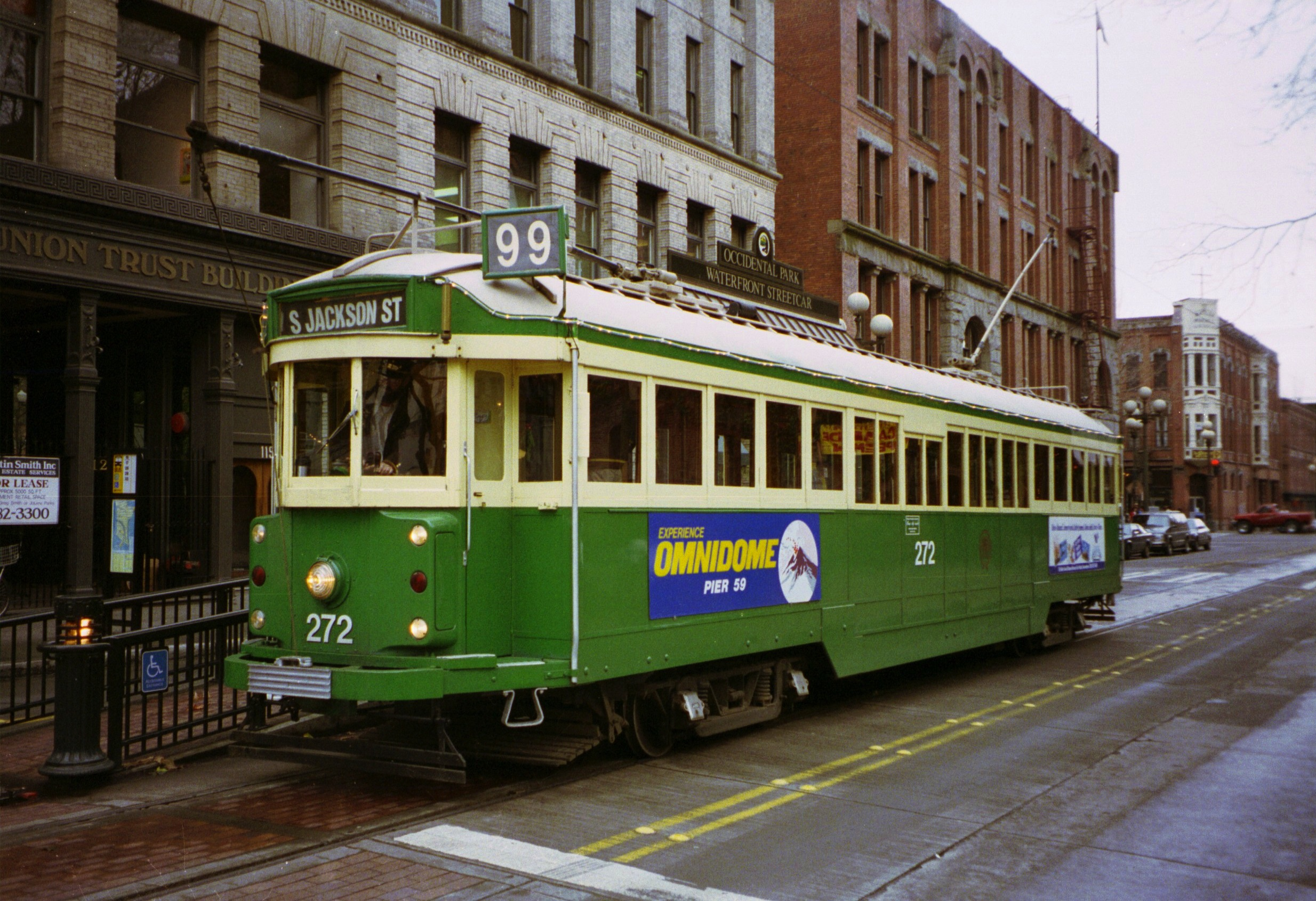
- Car 272 eastbound on Main Street, at the Occidental Park stop

Overview
- Status: Discontinued
- Locale: Seattle
- Termini: Broad Street at Alaskan Way; Jackson Street at 5th Avenue
- Stations: 9

Service
- Type: Heritage streetcar
- Services: 1
- Operator: King County Metro
- Rolling stock: 5 Melbourne W2 trams

History
- Opened: May 29, 1982
- Closed: November 18, 2005

Technical
- Line length: 1.6 mi (2.57 km)
- Character: At-grade
- Track gauge: 4 ft 8 1/2 in (1,435 mm) standard gauge
- Electrification: Overhead wires, 600 V DC

The Waterfront Streetcar, officially the George Benson Waterfront Streetcar Line, was a heritage streetcar line run by King County Metro in Seattle, Washington, United States. It traveled for 1.6-mile (2.6 km) along Alaskan Way on the city's waterfront facing Elliott Bay, under the Alaskan Way Viaduct. The Waterfront Streetcar used a fleet of five W2 trams from Melbourne, Australia.

Service began on May 29, 1982, the first streetcars to run in Seattle since the closure of the Seattle Municipal Street Railway on April 13, 1941. It initially terminated at Occidental Park in Pioneer Square until the line was extended to International District/Chinatown station in 1990. Service was officially suspended on November 18, 2005, when the maintenance barn and Broad Street station were demolished to make room for the Seattle Art Museum's Olympic Sculpture Park. A large portion of the trackage and four stations were demolished in 2012 as part of the reconstruction of Alaskan Way.

Streetcar service was replaced by King County Metro Route 99, which operated along Alaskan Way until February 2011 when construction forced Metro to reroute the line to 1st Avenue. King County Metro announced in January 2016 that a private venture would launch a fundraising effort to retrofit two of the historic Waterfront Streetcar vehicles to run alongside modern Seattle Streetcar vehicles on the Center City Connector along 1st Avenue.

== History ==
The original city streetcar system in Seattle ceased operations in April 1941 and was replaced with a network of electric trolleybuses and motor buses. City councilman George Benson first proposed the idea of building a streetcar line along the Seattle waterfront in 1974, a year after he was elected to the council, to be operational in time for the national Bicentennial on July 4, 1976. The line would use vintage streetcars, and the goal was to create an attraction that would bring tourists and local residents to the waterfront, to help rejuvenate the area, which had already begun a slow transition from a purely industrial district to one with shops and cultural attractions such as the (then-planned, later built) Seattle Aquarium. Eventually, the proposal garnered enough support from the public and Benson's fellow council members that funds were allocated for an engineering and design study, ultimately leading to the approval of the project. Some of the funding in the project's final stage came from a temporary Local Improvement District, a special taxing district in which businesses within its boundaries would agree to pay an extra tax for a specific benefit—in this instance the streetcar service. After lobbying by Benson and others, the state legislature approved granting such tax authority in 1981. "More than 70 percent" of the affected business owners endorsed taxing themselves to provide an estimated $1 million to fund completion of the streetcar project.

The line used previously existing freight railroad tracks adjacent to Alaskan Way, and construction for the streetcar project involved adding overhead trolley wires, high-platform stations, and a passing track near the middle of the line, which otherwise was single-track. The line started just north of Broad Street, near Pier 70, and until 1990 ran only as far south as Main Street, terminating at a station next to Alaskan Way, immediately south of Main.

Service began on May 29, 1982, which was the first streetcar run in Seattle since April 13, 1941. The first three streetcars had been brought to Seattle from Melbourne, Australia, by Councilman Benson in 1978. They had been Melbourne & Metropolitan Tramways Board cars 482, 512 and 518, and they kept those numbers in Seattle. Two more Melbourne streetcars entered service in 1990 and 1993. All were W2-class trams that had originally been built between 1925 and 1930.

In 1989, construction began on a quarter-mile extension of the streetcar along Main Street and 5th Avenue to Jackson Street, to connect to the International District/Chinatown Station of the then-new Downtown Seattle Transit Tunnel. The extension opened for regular service on June 23, 1990. The line's fourth ex-Melbourne streetcar, No. 272, entered service earlier that month. A fifth car of the same type, No. 605, entered service on June 1, 1993. On June 1, 2002, the King County Council approved legislation to rename the line in honor of councilmember Benson, christening it the "George Benson Waterfront Streetcar Line". The streetcar stations were rebranded and repainted in August 2003.

=== Cancellation of service ===
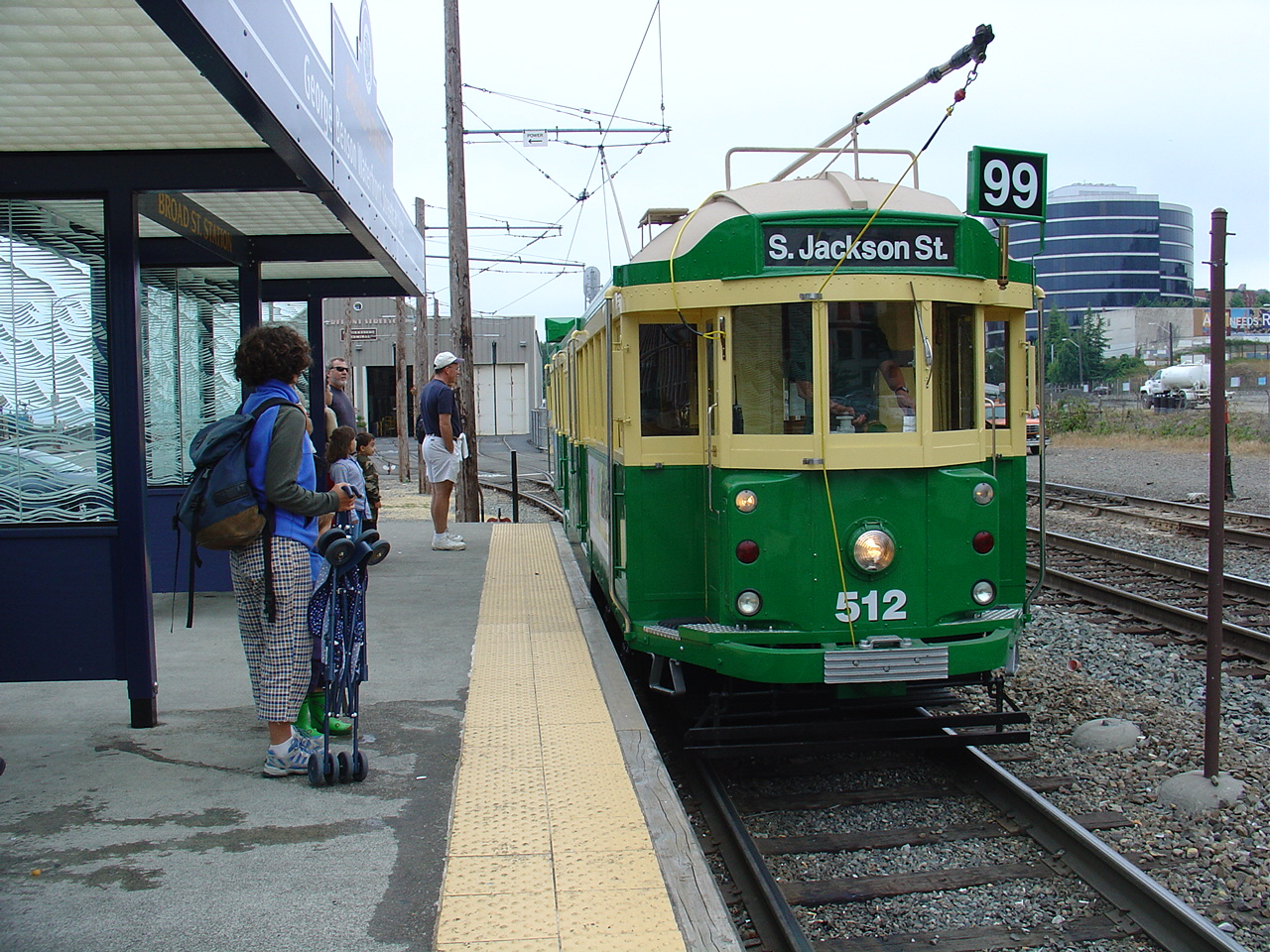
Broad Street station

The streetcar ceased operation on November 18, 2005, when the maintenance barn was demolished to make room for the Seattle Art Museum's Olympic Sculpture Park. A new maintenance barn was proposed to be built at Occidental Park to allow the resumption of operations as early as summer 2007. However, Metro cancelled involvement after delays made the new facility unlikely to be completed before the demolition of the Alaskan Way Viaduct began. An alternative proposal by the Port of Seattle was to extend the line northward along Myrtle Edwards Park to Smith Cove, where a new maintenance barn would be built on Port property. This proposal was not pursued.

In 2007, two years into the suspension of service, the route was named by National Geographic Society as one of the 10 Great Streetcar routes.

In spring 2012, a large portion of the trackage and the stations at Pike, University, Madison and Washington streets were demolished in as a part of the construction project drilling a deep bore tunnel to replace the Alaskan Way Viaduct.

The City of Seattle began studying the possibility of bringing streetcars back to the city center in late 2012. The locally preferred alternative for this project adopted in late 2014 supported a route along 1st Avenue and not Alaskan Way. James Corner Field Operations, the Manhattan-based landscape-architecture firm hired to recommend a new vision for the Seattle waterfront once the Viaduct has been demolished, also recommended the Streetcar not be returned to Alaskan Way, but to nearby First Avenue instead.

While future plans for the line were determined, the streetcars were stored in an old warehouse in SoDo for more than a decade. In 2015, the Federal Transit Administration informed King County that if the streetcars are not put back in service soon, Metro would need to pay $205,000 to compensate the agency for its remaining investment in the cars. At the same time, the warehouse used to store the streetcars was in poor condition and the land needed for expansion of a neighboring bus base.

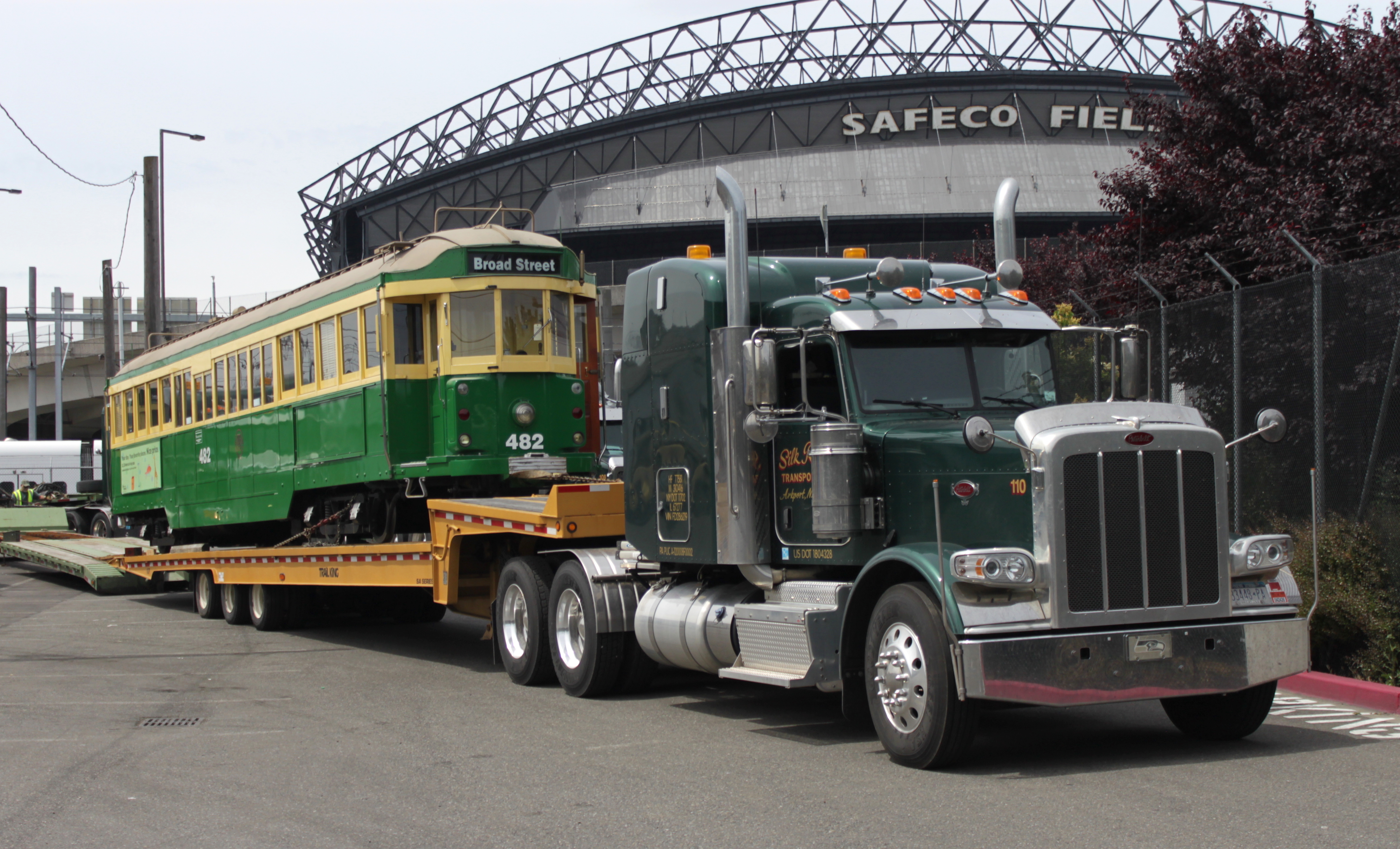
Car 482 loaded onto a truck trailer, about to leave for St. Louis

In January 2016, it was announced that a private venture, Friends of the Benson Trolleys, was intending to raise the money required to retrofit two of the streetcars to allow them to be used on the future Center City Connector on 1st Avenue. The plan closely mirrors one suggested in May 2009 by then Seattle Mayor, Greg Nickels. The remaining three cars were sold by King County to St. Louis, for potential use on the heritage Delmar Loop Trolley line. The specific cars sold to St. Louis were Nos. 482, 512, and 518, and they left Seattle in early June 2016. However, even though one car (512) was heavily modified (by Gomaco) in 2018 for service in St. Louis, it never entered service, and at the end of 2024 ownership of all three cars was transferred to Gomaco by the Bi-State Development Agency, which had taken over operation of the Loop Trolley in 2022 and dropped plans for more frequent service.

The streetcars retained by King County Metro are Nos. 272 and 605 (along with 525, which never entered service, and has been kept only as a source of parts). Because the warehouse in which they had been stored since the end of Waterfront Streetcar service in 2005 was due to be torn down, to make way for expansion of a Metro bus garage, the streetcars were moved out in early June 2016, to a private site in Arlington, Washington, where they will be stored indefinitely, awaiting possible future developments in the proposals for their return to service.

== Route ==
The line began at the Broad Street maintenance barn and mostly ran along the east side of Alaskan Way on Burlington Northern and Santa Fe Railway trackage under the Alaskan Way Viaduct. Its southernmost section in Pioneer Square consisted of an east–west track on South Main Street that passed Occidental Square and turned south onto 5th Avenue South. It terminated at South Jackson Street, across the street from International District station in the Downtown Seattle Transit Tunnel.

=== Stations ===
All of the stations (with the exception of the Occidental Park and Jackson Street stations) along the Alaskan Way were originally painted brown when the line first opened. In 2004, all of these stations were refurbished and repainted in Marine Blue. The Occidental and Jackson stations were designed to reflect the surrounding architecture along the streets when the line was extended in 1990. The Jackson Street stop featured an Asian Pagoda-style station while Occidental park had a vintage-style station.

Name	Neighborhood	Location	Status	Other
Waterfront Streetcar
Broad Street	Central Waterfront	Broad Street and Alaskan Way	Demolished in 2005	Served Myrtle Edwards Park, Seattle Center.
Vine Street	Central Waterfront	Vine Street and Alaskan Way	Station Head House Demolished c. 2012–15, Platform remains	Served Port of Seattle headquarters, Victoria Clipper, The Edgewater, The Art Institute of Seattle
Bell Street	Central Waterfront	Bell Street and Alaskan Way	Demolished in 2018	Served Belltown, Bell Street Pier
Pike Street	Central Waterfront	Pike Street and Alaskan Way	Demolished in 2011	Served Seattle Aquarium, Pike Hillclimb, Pike Place Market
University Street	Central Waterfront	University Street and Alaskan Way	Demolished in 2011	Served Waterfront Park, Bay Pavilion, Harbor Steps, Seattle Art Museum, Downtown
Madison Street	Central Waterfront	Madison Street and Alaskan Way	Demolished in 2011	Connections to Washington State Ferries Colman Dock (Bainbridge Island, Bremerton)
Washington Street	Central Waterfront	Washington Street and Alaskan Way	Demolished in 2011	Connection to Vashon Island Passenger Ferry, West Seattle Water Taxi. Served Pioneer Square, Harbor Entrance Pergola
Occidental Park	Pioneer Square	S. Main Street and Occidental Avenue S.	Demolished in 2020	Served Pioneer Square, Klondike Gold Rush National Historical Park
Jackson Street	International District	S. Jackson Street and Fifth Avenue S.	Demolished in 2019	Connections to Downtown Seattle Transit Tunnel and King Street Station. Served Qwest Field, Safeco Field, Uwajimaya

== Service and operations ==
Prior to its discontinuation in 2005, the Waterfront Streetcar line ran at a frequency of 20 minutes from 6:30 a.m. to 11:30 p.m. on weekdays, and 10:00 a.m. to 7:00 p.m. on weekends. The streetcar was located entirely within Metro's Free Ride Area, but charged a normal fare paid with cash or a valid bus transfer or pass.

The fleet of streetcar vehicles had wooden bench seating for 43 passengers and standing room for 40. The high platforms at stations allowed for level boarding, and the vehicles had room for wheelchairs and other mobility devices. The streetcar line was labeled as Route 99, which also applied to its replacement bus route. In 2004, its final year of full operations, the streetcar line carried 403,600 passengers.

== See also ==
- Seattle Streetcar Network
- South Lake Union Streetcar
- First Hill Streetcar
