= William Owen Bush =

American politician (1832–1907)

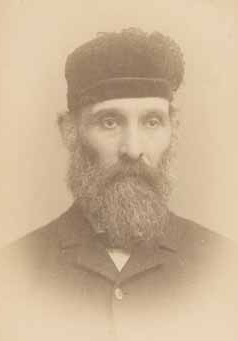
- William Owen Bush

Member of the Washington House of Representatives
- In office 1889–1895

Personal details
- Born: July 4, 1832 Clay County, Missouri
- Died: February 13, 1907 (aged 74) Olympia, Washington
- Party: Republican
- Spouse: Mandana Kimsey
- Children: George, John Shotwell, Mandana Isabella
- Parent(s): George Washington Bush, Isabella James
- Occupation: Farmer, politician

William Owen Bush (July 4, 1832 – February 13, 1907) was an American farmer and politician who was elected to the Washington House of Representatives as part of the inaugural Washington State Legislature in 1889. He was the first African-American to serve in the Washington legislature. He introduced legislation that established Washington State University and tirelessly promoted Washington agriculture.

In its obituary, the Morning Olympian newspaper described Bush as "one of the oldest and most famous pioneers of the state of Washington" and declared that "probably no resident of the state or territory throughout its history has done more to advertise the state than W. O. Bush".

== Early life ==
Bush was born in Clay County, Missouri. He was the son of George Bush, a celebrated settler and veteran of the War of 1812 who inherited a portion of the substantial fortune of his father, Matthew, and Isabella James. Bush's father was of mixed race, while his mother was of German descent. Some of his descendants denied that his grandfather, Matthew, had any African ancestry, claiming instead that he was from India. However, George and William Bush both identified as African-American and were described in contemporary accounts as a negro.

In 1844 at the age of 12, Bush traveled with his father, mother, and siblings from Missouri to Oregon along with five other families. By the time the family had reached the territory, the Provisional Government of Oregon had enacted legislation prohibiting land ownership by blacks. Undeterred, the elder Bush moved his family north, across the Columbia River, into what would eventually become the Territory of Washington; although at the time this was contested land. There, the elder Bush worked for the Hudson's Bay Company and eventually established a farm in Thurston County.

== Career ==
=== Agriculture ===
After his father's death, William Owen Bush took control of the family farm, operating it with his brothers and growing the family's wealth. In 1872, Bush helped found the Western Washington Industrial Association, which organized agricultural expositions, and served as the group's inaugural president. Grains from the Bush farm won gold medals at the 1876 Philadelphia World's Fair, and the 1893 Chicago World's Fair. In 1893 he was appointed to represent the United States on the Advisory Council of the World's Congress Auxiliary on Farm Culture and Cereal Industry.

=== Politics ===
Following Washington's admission to the United States in 1889, Bush ran and was elected to the first sitting of the Washington House of Representatives as a member of the Republican Party. In 1890 he introduced and helped pass the state's first civil rights act, which prohibited racial discrimination in "public accommodations...public conveyances on land or water, theatres and other places of public amusement and restaurants." Bush is also credited with introducing the legislation that led to the establishment of Washington State University. He was elected to the legislature a second time, serving until 1895.

== Personal life ==
On May 26, 1859, Bush married a widow, Mandana Smith Kimsey, in Marion County, Oregon. She was born in Missouri in 1826 and traveled to Oregon with her parents in 1847. They established a farm 12 miles (19 km) south of the family homestead. The couple had three children, George O., John Shotwell, and Mandana Isabella. George O. Bush died in infancy. His wife died in 1899.

Bush died in 1907 at St. Peter's Hospital in Olympia, Washington and was interred at Union Cemetery in Tumwater, Washington.

== See also ==
- Charles Stokes – the first African-American elected to the Washington legislature from King County, Washington
- African American officeholders from the end of the Civil War until before 1900
