= Sam Smith (American politician) =

American politician (1922–1995)

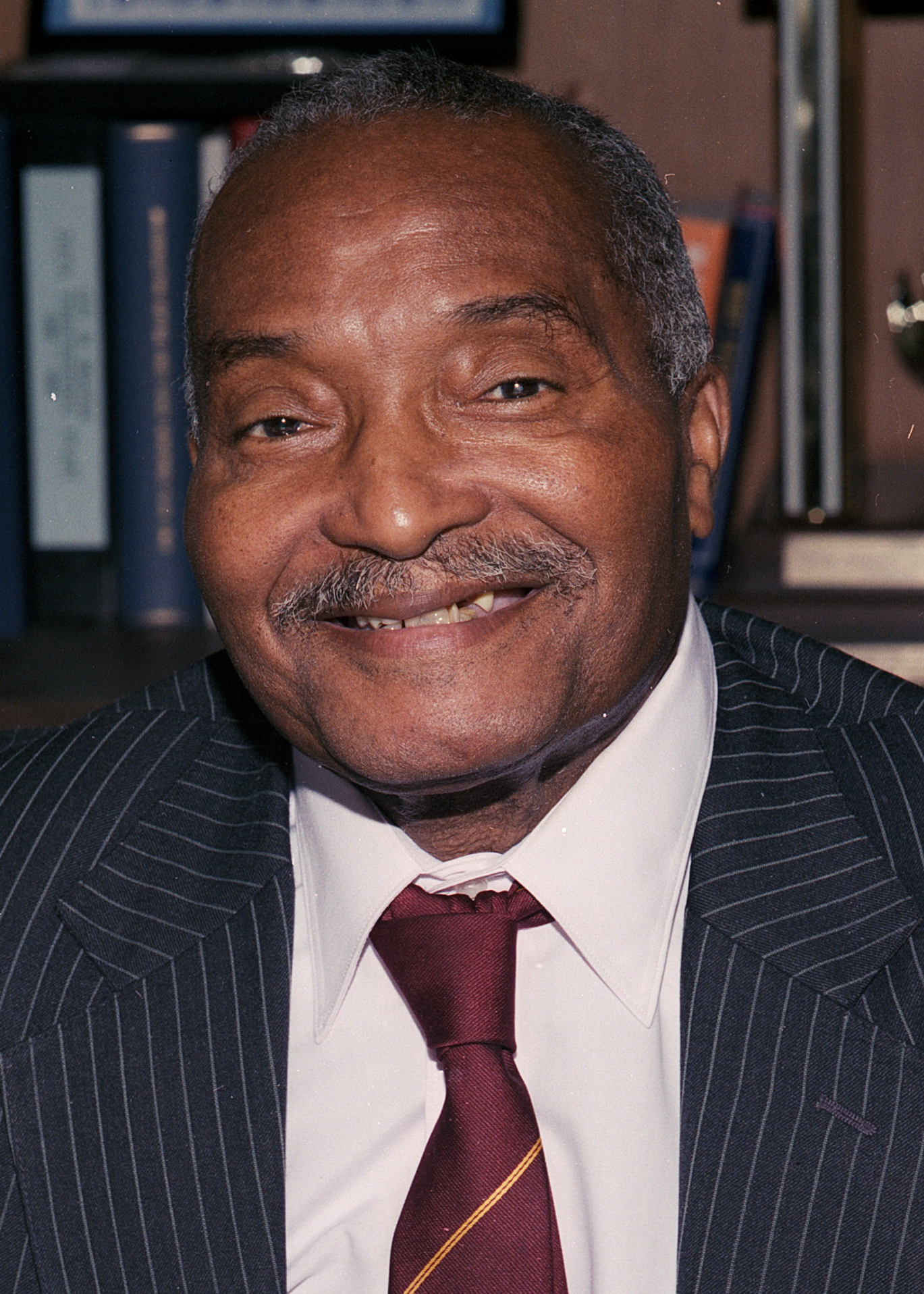

President of the Seattle City Council
- In office 1986–1989
- Preceded by: Norm Rice
- Succeeded by: Paul Kraabel
- In office 1974–1977
- Preceded by: Liem Eng Tuai
- Succeeded by: Phyllis Lamphere

Member of the Seattle City Council for Position 3
- In office 1968–1992
- Preceded by: Ray Eckmann
- Succeeded by: Sherry Harris

Member of the Washington House of Representative from the 37th District
- In office 1959–1967
- Preceded by: Charles Stokes
- Succeeded by: George Fleming

Personal details
- Born: July 23, 1922 Gibsland, Louisiana, U.S.
- Died: November 16, 1995 (aged 73) Seattle, Washington, U.S.
- Party: Democratic
- Spouse: Marion King (d. 1991)
- Education: Seattle University; University of Washington
- Occupation: Politician

Samuel J. Smith (July 23, 1922 – November 16, 1995) was a member of the Washington House of Representatives from 1959–1968 and served on the Seattle City Council for 24 years, including eight as president of the council. He was the first African-American to serve on the Seattle City Council.

== Early life and education ==
Smith was born on July 21, 1922, in Gibsland, Louisiana to Steve and Bernice Smith. His father was a Baptist minister and farmer, and his mother was a teacher. In 1942, Smith was drafted into the U.S. Army and stationed in Seattle, before serving in the Philippines during World War II.

At the end of the War, Smith returned to Seattle, and moved to the Central District where he married his wife Marion. He went on to receive degrees from Seattle University (Social science, 1951) and the University of Washington (Economics, 1952). Smith was the first Black student to enroll at Seattle University, followed by Millie Bown Russell, who graduated before him.

After college, Smith went to work for the Boeing Company for 17 years.

== Washington House of Representatives ==
Smith's political career started in 1956 when he unsuccessfully ran for the Washington House of Representatives for the Washington's 37th legislative district against Republican Charles Stokes. In 1958, he challenged Stokes again and won. Smith became the fourth African-American to win a seat in the state house, as well as the second from King County.

=== Open Housing Act ===
In the legislature, Smith was a vocal proponent of civil rights legislation. One of his first acts in the legislature was to introduce a bill that would have banned discrimination based on race or religion in the rental or sale of homes, which failed. He repeatedly reintroduced the bill, and in 1967, the Open Housing Act passed in his final term, a high point in his career.^{:111}

In order to pass, the final bill made concessions, dropping parts of Smith's proposal and measures supported by groups like the Washington State Board Against Discrimination. In one case, Yakima city leaders cited financial losses for protesting the inclusion of property tax incentives for apartment owners who signed non-discrimination agreements, and this measure was excluded. The main power of the final bill was that it enabled the state to revoke a real estate agent's license if they discriminated against clients more than twice in one year.^{:111-112}

The local real estate industry campaigned against the bill and succeeded in pushing it into a public referendum to be decided in the November 1968 election. In spite of their misgivings over the effectiveness of this bill, Seattle civil rights activists on a Central District housing committee rallied support for the bill during the referendum. At the time, the Central District was the only area of the city where Black people could live, due to racial discrimination in law and during the real estate process. Seattle's Japanese American community had not previously unified around the open housing cause, but Y. Philip Hayasaka and Toru Sakahara also convinced the Seattle branch of the Japanese American Citizens League to back the bill and city open housing measures.^{:111-112} Many people in the state voted against the bill during the referendum, but the results were moot because that April the U.S. federal government passed the Fair Housing Act of 1968.

=== Leaving the House ===
Smith served five consecutive terms in the Washington House of Representatives until 1967, when he left to seek a seat on the Seattle City Council. That same year, he was honored as Legislator of the Year by the Young Man's Democratic Club.

Smith's wife, Marion King Smith, campaigned for Smith's former seat in the legislature in 1970, but was defeated by Republican Michael Ross. Smith would later attribute Ross' victory over his wife to a defection of Smith's traditional allies among the district's black leaders, who were "afraid that the power in the black community was too centered on me."

== Seattle City Council ==
Smith ran for the Seattle City Council in 1967 after Ray Eckmann retired from the council. Smith defeated Bob Dunn in the general election 53% to 47%, becoming the first African-American Seattle City Councilmember. Additionally, Smith and Art Fletcher, elected in Pasco that year, became the first African-American city councilmembers in Washington State. Smith would win in large margins in his next four reelection bids.

=== Open Housing Law ===
After joining the city council, Smith continued to campaign for open housing. Black civil rights organizations in the city like the NAACP and Congress of Racial Equality had been advocating for these laws for years, and city councilmember Wing Luke had championed these laws against an opposed city council and mayor. Rather than pass a law, the city created a Citizen's Advisory Committee, then a Human Rights Commission, and Black civil rights groups staged protests against these delay tactics.^{:87-88} The council decided in 1963 to write the law but exclude an emergency clause, meaning that it could be sent to Seattle voters for approval. Seattle's real estate community, many homeowners, and some city councilmembers advertised against the law, while religious and civil rights organizations continued to campaign for it. In 1964 the measure was defeated by a large margin. Luke died in 1965, so when Smith entered the council, he became the architect of the city's open housing law. Martin Luther King Jr.'s assassination sparked violence throughout the country, including in Seattle's Central District, and helped pressure legislators into supporting civil rights action.^{113:114}

In 1968, Smith spearheaded the municipal Open Housing Law, which prohibited discrimination in housing, and it passed the council unanimously. It was passed three weeks after King's assassination, and this time as an emergency measure, which protected it from being subject to a public referendum. The act banned discrimination based on race, color, religion, ancestry, or national origin in the rental or sale of homes. It directed people who were discriminated against to file a complaint with the city's Human Rights Commission, and could fine offenders up to $500. Many in the city proclaimed this a major victory for civil rights, but the law did not stop other avenues of real estate discrimination, and it put the onus on victims to contest discrimination. The effectiveness of this law was called into question by local civil rights groups like the Seattle Urban League. Still, the law was expanded over the following decades to ban discrimination on the basis of other characteristics like sex, marital status, sexual orientation, politics, age, parental status, disability, and gender identity.^{113:114}

=== Other actions ===
Smith served as president of the city council for eight years and ran unsuccessfully for Mayor of Seattle four times during his council tenure. He also chaired the Public Safety Committee, Housing and Human Services Committee, Labor Committee, and the Utilities Committee.

Smith was a fiscal and moral conservative who focused his legislative priorities on alleviating urban concerns, especially among Seattle's minorities. Smith successfully pushed for the city to hire more black firefighters and police officers after he found out that there was only one in each department. He also pushed against rate increases in Seattle City Light during his tenure.

In 1985, the municipal league named Smith "Outstanding Legislator of the Year." The same year, Governor Booth Gardner designated "Sam Smith Day" in his honor.

In 1989, Smith was the lone vote against Seattle's Family Leave Ordinance. The law allowed city employees to extend benefits to domestic partners, bringing the city into compliance with its employment discrimination laws and making it the largest city to provide health insurance benefits to employees' unmarried cohabiting partners. Smith advocated for citizens to veto the law, but a referendum against it was defeated in 1990. Smith blamed his vote on this law for rallying Seattle's LGBTQ community against him. He believed that they caused the Municipal League to downgrade his rating, and resented Cal Anderson for accusing him of homophobia.

In 1991, Smith ran for reelection for a seventh term, facing Boeing engineer and activist Sherry Harris. In the general election, Harris defeated Smith 65% to 35%. There were various reasons for Smith's defeat, including long hospitalizations due to complications from diabetes, the passing of his wife, and to the mobilization of Seattle's LGBTQ community, who were upset with some of his socially conservative positions.

== Death and legacy ==
Smith suffered from ill health in his later years and lost a leg to diabetes in 1985 and his right leg in 1991. He died at his home in the Seward Park neighborhood of Seattle on November 16, 1995, at the age of 73. The Interstate 90 lid in Seattle was named Sam Smith Park based on nominations from the community, the Washington Black Heritage Society and the Urban League of Greater Seattle.

== See also ==
- Washington Oral History Project
