= Charles M. Stokes =

American politician (1902–1996)

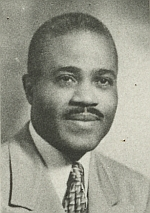

Member of the Washington House of Representatives from the 37th district
- In office 1951–1955
- In office 1957–1959

Personal details
- Born: Charles Moorehead Stokes; February 1, 1902 Fredonia, Kansas, U.S.
- Died: November 25, 1996 (aged 94) Seattle, Washington, U.S.
- Party: Republican
- Spouse: Josephine Stokes
- Children: Vicki Stokes, Stephanie Stokes Oliver, Attny Andre Wooten
- Parent(s): Norris Jefferson Stokes and Myrtle Garner
- Education: University of Kansas
- Occupation: Attorney, politician

Charles Moorehead Stokes (February 1, 1903 – November 25, 1996) was an American politician, jurist, and lawyer who served several terms in the Washington State House of Representatives.

== Early life and education ==
Stokes was born in Fredonia, Kansas to a Baptist minister and was raised in Pratt, Kansas. Stokes was initiated into the Mu Chapter of Kappa Alpha Psi Fraternity Incorporated in 1926. He graduated from the University of Kansas in 1931. After briefly practicing law for the state's revenue commission Stokes, in 1943, moved to Seattle, Washington where he entered into private practice.

== Career ==
=== Politics ===
In 1950 Stokes was elected to the Washington State House of Representatives from Washington's 37th legislative district as a Republican, becoming the first African-American legislator from King County and just the third in state history. At the end of his first term he was selected "Outstanding Freshman Legislator" by the Young Republican Club.

Stokes was reelected in 1952 and, the same year, campaigned for Dwight Eisenhower as a delegate to the Republican National Convention during which he delivered an address from the platform. In 1954 he sought election to the Washington State Senate, but was defeated. He returned to the House of Representatives in 1956 before being unseated in his 1958 reelection bid by Democrat Sam Smith. In 1960 he ran unsuccessfully for Lieutenant Governor of Washington and, the same year, headed Nelson Rockefeller's campaign for the Republican presidential nomination in Washington.

During his time in the legislature, Stokes was credited with initiating the idea of a state lottery, and for introducing one of the most sweeping civil rights bills in the state up to that time.

=== After politics ===
In the years following his exit from politics, Stokes helped co-found KZAM-AM and Liberty Bank (absorbed into Emerald City Bank in 1988 which, in turn, was taken over by KeyBank). In 1968 he was appointed to fill a vacancy in a district court judgeship, which he held until his retirement in 1978.

== Personal life ==
Stokes was married and had three children. He died of cancer in 1996 at the age of 94. The "Judge Charles M. Stokes Overlook" near Seattle's Judkins Park is named after him. Stokes' daughter, Stephanie Stokes Oliver, is a former editor for Essence Magazine and, in 2004, wrote a biography of her father, Song for My Father: Memoir of an All-American Family.

== See also ==
- Michael Ross
- William Owen Bush
