= Michael Simmons (pioneer) =

American pioneer

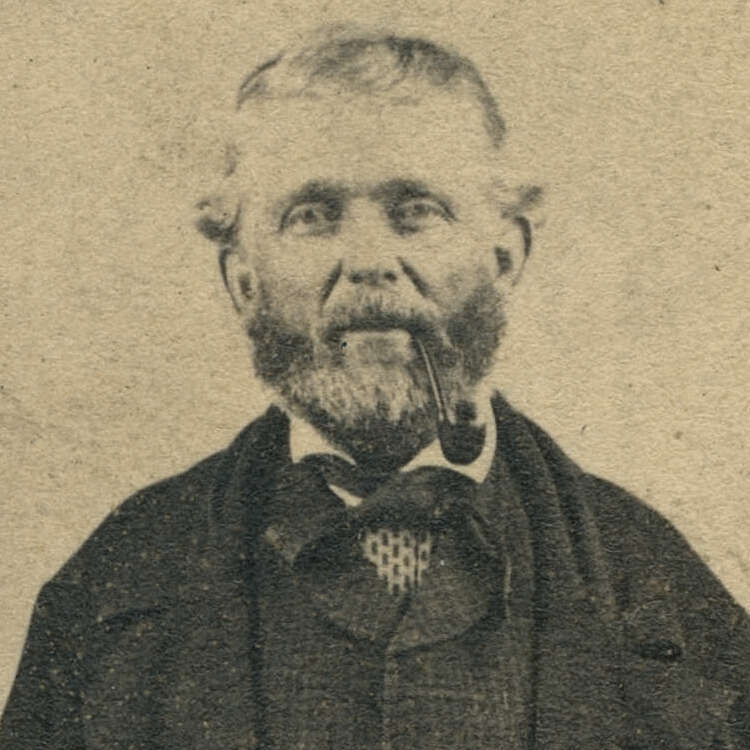
- Simmons c. 1865
- Born: August 5, 1814; Bullitt County, Kentucky, US
- Died: November 15, 1867 (aged 53); Tumwater, Washington Territory
- Burial place: Masonic Memorial Park
- Occupations: Pioneer, Miller, Trader, Indian Agent
- Known for: Founder of the first permanent American settlement north of the Columbia River
- Spouse: Elizabeth Kindred (b.1820–d.1891) (m. 1835)
- Children: 13

Michael Troutman Simmons (August 5, 1814 – November 15, 1867) was an American pioneer and one of the first white men to settle in the Puget Sound. He played a significant role in the founding of Tumwater, Washington. Simmons went on to have political influence in the newly established Washington Territory, acting as an Indian Agent, enforcing Governor Isaac Stevens's treaties with local tribes.

== Early life ==
Simmons was one of ten children, born in Kentucky in 1814. As a boy, he moved with his mother to Pike County, Illinois. When Simmons was 21 years old, he moved to Iowa and married a 15-year-old girl named Elizabeth Kindred. Five years later, the couple moved to Missouri where Simmons built a gristmill.

== Journey west to the Puget Sound ==
In 1844, at the age of 30, Simmons and his family abandoned the Midwest and set out on the Oregon Trail alongside a group of pioneers (including his friend George Bush). While on the trail, Simmons emerged as a leader among the group and his fellow pioneers began calling him "Colonel".

After arriving in Oregon, most of the party temporarily settled near Fort Vancouver, while Simmons led multiple expeditions north to explore the Puget Sound region. In October of 1845, he returned to Fort Vancouver and convinced his wife, children and four other families to follow him back up north to the base of Budd Inlet, where they would establish a settlement of their own. They named the settlement New Market, which later evolved into the city of Tumwater.

Tumwater Falls c. 1892

In New Market, Simmons capitalized on the power of Tumwater Falls to construct mills, organizing the Puget Sound Milling Co. with Edmund Sylvester, Antonio B. Rabbeson and others in August 1847. A few years later, Simmons sold his mill operation and moved to Olympia, where he became the city's first postmaster.

== Role as Indian agent ==
In 1854, Governor Isaac Stevens appointed Simmons as an Indian Agent for the newly founded Washington Territory. In this role, Simmons helped establish and enforce several treaties with local tribes that resulted in Indigenous people being relocated to reservations. Simmons' name appears on the Treaty of Medicine Creek, the Treaty of Point Elliott, the Point No Point Treaty, the Neah Bay Treaty, and the Quinault Treaty.

== Family life ==
=== Children ===
Simmons and his wife Elizabeth had 13 children together, including one lost in infancy. The couple already had four young boys when they left Missouri and set out for the west. Their fifth child, Christopher Columbus Simmons, was the first American pioneer to be born north of the Columbia River.

1. George Washington Simmons (1837–1929)
2. David Kindred Simmons (1838–1882)
3. Francis Marion Simmons (1841–1924)
4. McDonald Simmons (1843–1906)
5. Christopher Columbus Simmons (1845–1931)
6. Benjamin Franklin Simmons (1848–1925)
7. Charlotte Elizabeth Simmons Koontz (1850–1929)
8. Douglas Woodburg Simmons (1852–1852)
9. Stephen Douglass Simmons (d. 1852)
10. Mary Allen Simmons (1853–1919)
11. Catharine Troutman Bannon (1857–1941)
12. Charles Mason Simmons (1860–1944)
13. Michael Troutman Simmons Jr. (1862–1939)

== Death and legacy ==
Simmons died on November 15, 1867 from acute hepatitis. He is buried at the Masonic Memorial Park in Tumwater alongside his wife and many of their children. In his obituary, Simmons' was remembered as "...a man of iron constitution... and vigorous intellect."

Today, an elementary school within the Tumwater School District bears his name: Michael T. Simmons Elementary.
