= Evans School of Public Policy and Governance =

Public policy school of the University of Washington

Coordinates: 47°39′27″N 122°18′37″W

- Other names: Daniel J. Evans School of Public Policy and Governance
- Type: Public school of public policy
- Established: 1962
- Parent institution: University of Washington
- Dean: Jodi Sandfort
- Location: Seattle, Washington, U.S.
- Campus: Urban
- Website: evans.uw.edu

The Evans School of Public Policy and Governance is the public policy school of the University of Washington, a public research university in Seattle, Washington. The school is named after Daniel J. Evans, former governor of Washington and United States Senator.

The Evans School emphasizes policy analysis and management through its undergraduate minor, master's degree programs, doctoral program, and non-degree and certificate programs.

As of 2022, U.S. News & World Report ranked the Evans School as tied for 3rd out of 275 schools of public affairs. The U.S. News & World Report also ranked the Evans School for its expertise in the areas of Environmental Policy and Management (#2), Local Government Management (#18), Nonprofit Management (#5), Public Finance & Budgeting (#8 tie), Public Management & Leadership (#11), Public Policy Analysis (#14), Social Policy (#12), and Urban Policy (#27).

== History and campus ==
The school was formerly known as the Graduate School of Public Affairs, and was founded in 1962 as the first school of public affairs at a public university. It was renamed in 1999 to honor former Washington State Governor and U.S. Senator Daniel J. Evans.

The Evans School is located in Parrington Hall at the University of Washington in Seattle. Parrington Hall opened in 1902 as the university's science building and is named after Vernon L. Parrington, an English professor at the university from 1908 to 1929. It underwent a $24M renovation in 2019–20 to modernize the historic facility, achieving LEED Gold standards. The facility reopened in September 2020 with new classrooms outfitted with the technology and spaces needed to support engaged learning and community discussions.

== Academic experience ==
=== Academic programs ===
The academic programs include:

- Undergraduate Bachelor of Arts in Public Service and Policy
- Undergraduate Minor in Public Policy
- Master in Public Administration
- EMPA
- Ph.D. in Public Policy & Management
- Joint & Concurrent Degrees
- Graduate certificates

=== Concurrent degrees ===
The Evans School also offers concurrent master's degrees with other University of Washington programs.

== Student Consulting Lab ==
Evans School students are not interns helping with day-to-day administrative tasks; they are project-focused professionals working independently with key guidance from faculty advisors and periodic assistance from the employing organization.

== Research impact ==
=== Areas of expertise ===
Evans School faculty and research specializations cover a broad array of disciplines related to public policy, management, and governance.

=== Research centers and partners ===
In addition to the research work of individual faculty members, the Evans School research centers and research partners provide policy analyses for issues at the state, regional, national, and international levels.

== Student organizations ==
The Evans School Student Organization (ESO) serves as the liaison between the Evans School student body and the faculty and administration. ESO places students on most faculty committees and plays a key role in:

- Developing curriculum
- Hiring faculty members
- Shaping academic policies
- Evaluating courses and professors
- Setting degree requirements

Other student organizations include:

- Evans Network of Women (Now)
- Evans People of Color (E-POC)
- Evans International Students Association (EISA)
- Graduate Environmental Policy Forum (GreenEvans)
- Partnership for Community & Diversity (PCD)
- Out in Public (OiP)
- UW International City/County Management Association (ICMA) Student Chapter

== Elected alumni ==
- Sally J. Clark, Former Seattle City Council Member
- Karen Fraser, Former Washington State Senator
- Bob Hasegawa, Washington State Senator
- Nicole Macri, Washington State Representative
- Joe McDermott (politician), Former King County Council
- Mark Mullet, Former Washington State Senator
- Marcus Riccelli, Washington State Senator
- Norman B. Rice, Former City of Seattle Mayor (1990–1997)
- Christine Rolfes, Kitsap County Commissioner
- Vandana Slatter, Washington State Senator
- Stephan Blanford, Former Seattle Schools Board of Directors
- Alexis Mercedes Rinck, Seattle City Councilmember

== Accreditation ==
The Evans School's MPA program is accredited by NASPAA, the National Association of Schools of Public Affairs and Administration.
