= Paul Jacob Alexander =

American politician (1904–1969)

Paul Alexander
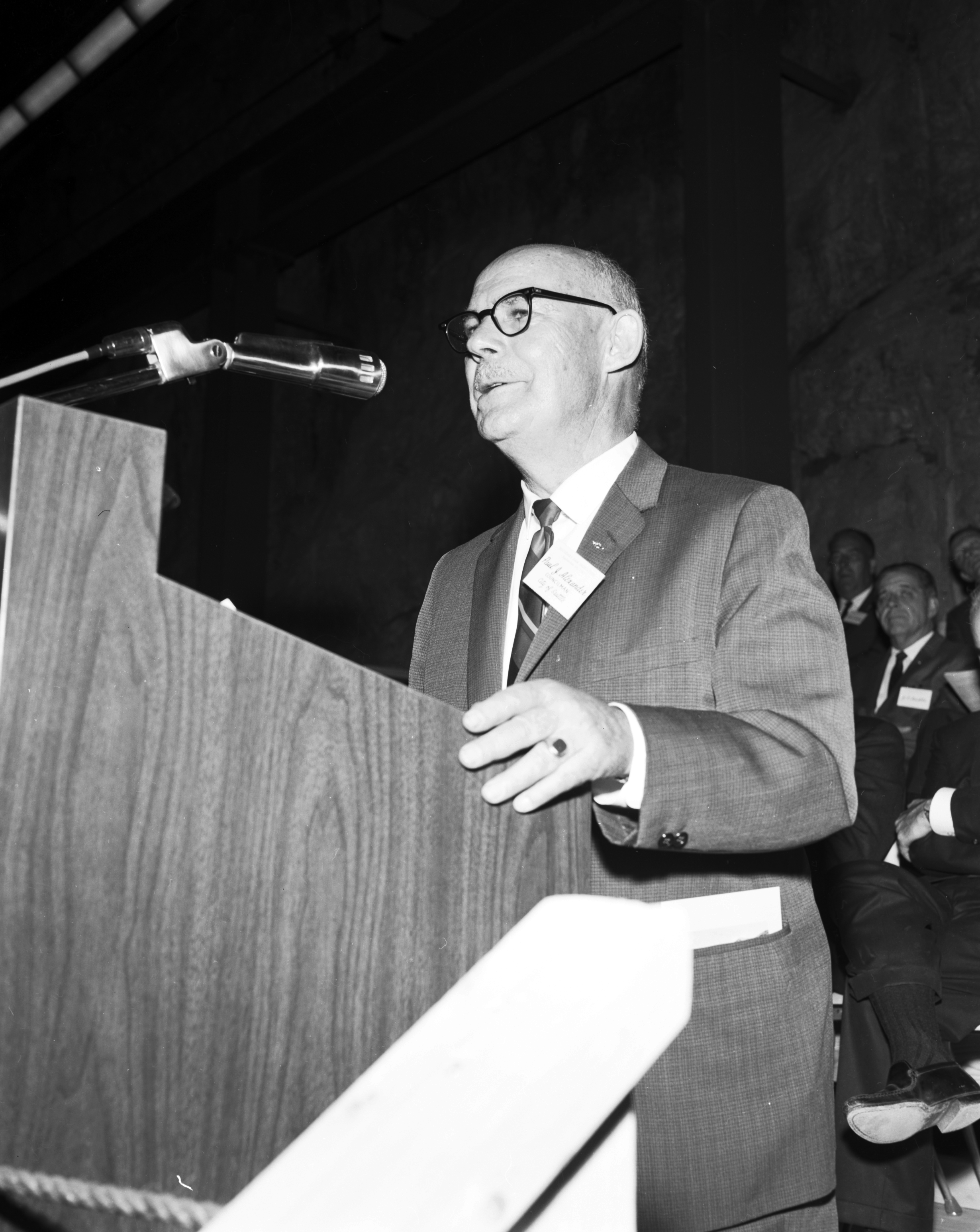

Member of the Seattle City Council
- In office 1956–1969
- Succeeded by: Liem Tuai

Personal details
- Born: March 11, 1904 Seattle, Washington
- Died: May 6, 1969 (aged 65) Washington, D.C.
- Party: Republican
- Occupation: newspaper publisher, Seattle City Councilmember

Paul Jacob Alexander (March 11, 1904 – May 6, 1969) was a newspaper publisher and Seattle City Councilman.

Paul Jacob Alexander was born in Seattle, Washington on March 11, 1904, to Alfred and Lillian (Wooding) Alexander. He graduated from Ballard High School and spent a semester at the University of Washington. He worked for The Seattle Times in the 1920s, and purchased the Rainier District Times, a community newspaper in the Rainier Valley, in 1929. He sold the paper in 1965.

He ran unsuccessfully for the Seattle City Council in 1952 and 1954. He was elected in 1956 and re-elected in 1960 and 1964. He was a Republican, and although he was a strong supporter of freedom of the press, he considered himself a conservative. In 1963, he succeeded in removing an emergency clause from Seattle's proposed open housing ordinance that would have allowed it to take effect without a public vote, and in 1964 he ran for re-election as an opponent of open housing.

As the chairman of the council's Utilities Committee, he was attending a reception at the American Public Power Association in Washington, D.C. when he died of a heart attack. Liem Tuai was appointed to fill his seat.

He lived in Rainier Valley, a block from Lake Washington.
