= George Washington (Washington pioneer) =

American pioneer

George Washington, pioneer
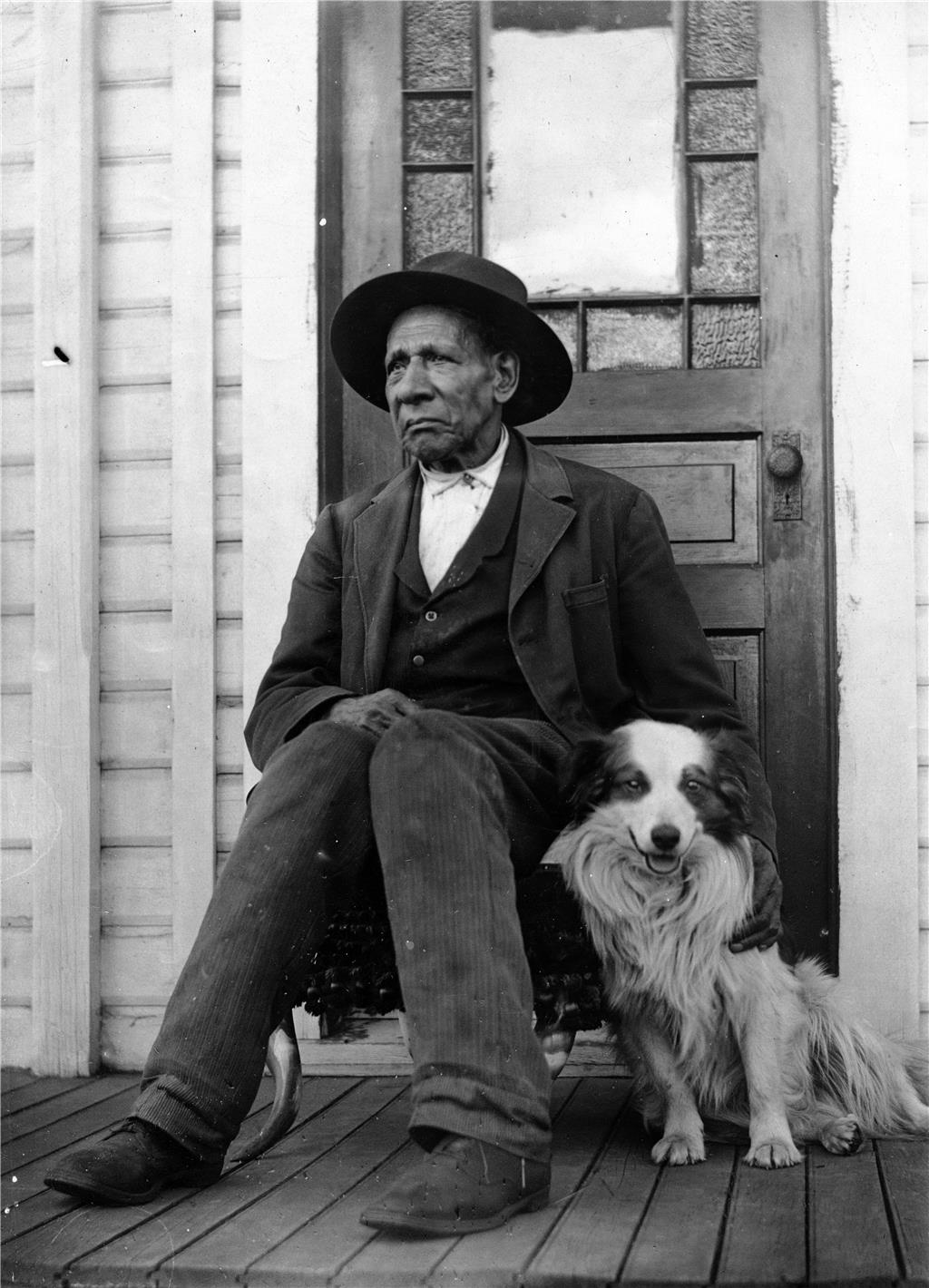
- Washington with his dog circa 1890.
- Born: August 15, 1817 near Winchester, Virginia
- Died: August 26, 1905 (aged 88)
- Occupations: Farmer and business owner
- Known for: Founder of Centralia, Washington

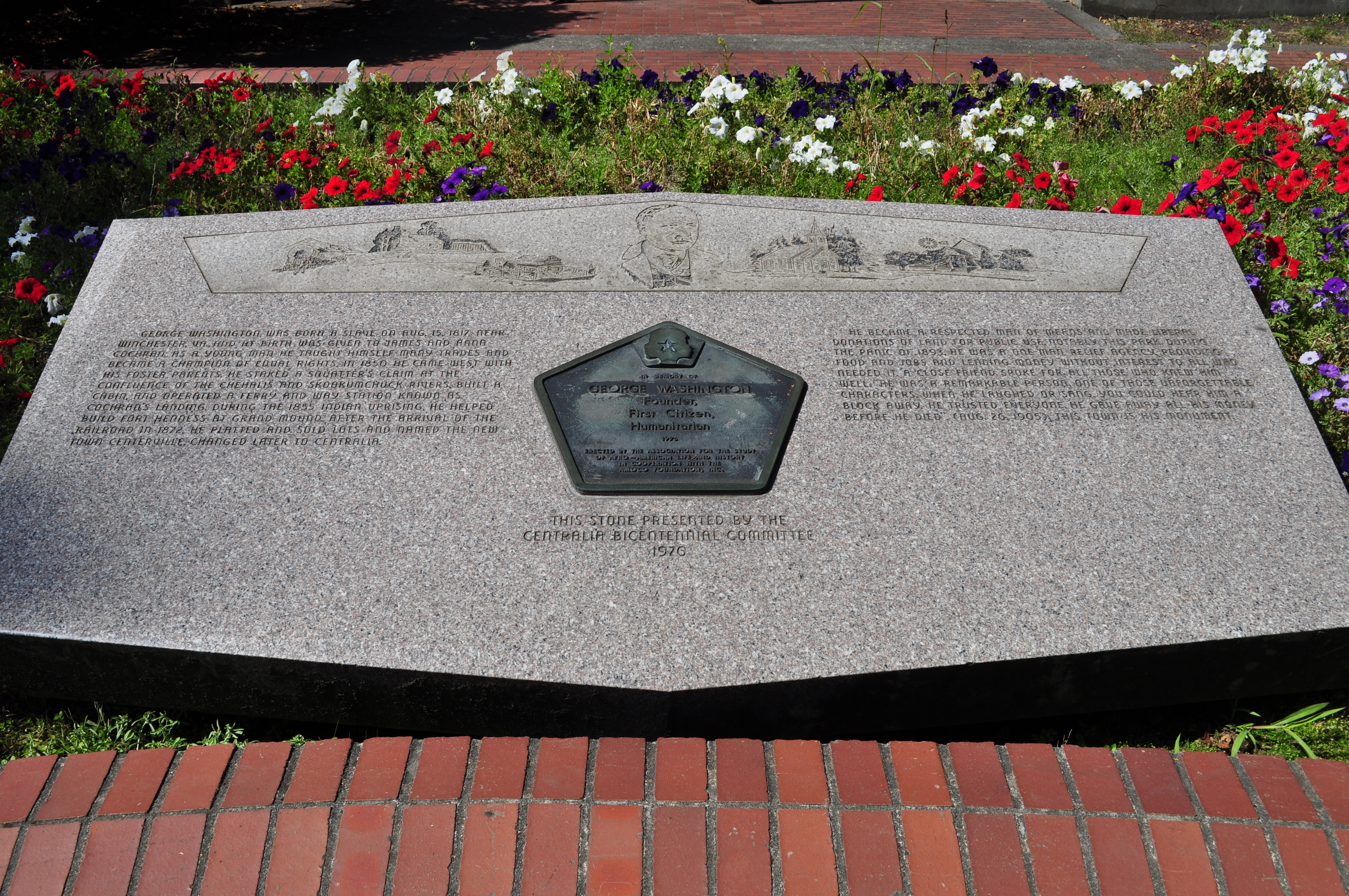
Memorial plaque, Centralia, Washington

George Washington (August 15, 1817 – August 26, 1905) was the founder of the town of Centralia, Washington. He is remembered as a leading African American pioneer of the Pacific Northwest.

== Early life ==
Born in 1817 (Note: Washington's birth year is in some dispute, with sources reporting the year as 1818.) within 10 miles of Winchester, Virginia, he was the son of a former slave and a woman of English descent. His father was sold soon thereafter to another plantation and his mother gave George to Anna and James Cochran, a white couple who adopted and raised him. When he was four, the Cochrans moved west to Delaware County, Ohio. This region contained several stops on the Underground Railroad. They later left for Missouri. Washington became a skilled rifleman and taught himself to read. He was given full rights as a citizen, except the right to vote, after the Cochrans petitioned the state of Missouri.

== Move to the Pacific Northwest ==
Fearing he might lose his freedom after the passage of the Compromise of 1850, Washington moved the Cochrans and himself over the Oregon Trail. Arriving in the Oregon Territory in 1852, they found he could not establish a claim for any land due to the exclusion laws passed by the Oregon Territorial Legislature in 1849. Upon arrival, because of these exclusion laws, Washington and his family were forced to settle nearby in Milwaukie. Washington started working as a logger, cutting timber for $90 a month plus board.

About three months after his arrival in Milwaukie, Washington became very ill. The ailment was unknown but he was in serious condition. The closest hospital at this time in pioneer country was the Columbia Barracks military fort (later Fort Vancouver) on the north side of the Columbia River. When the Cochrans took him there for treatment, they were told it was just for soldiers, though when the doctor came and saw Washington's condition he had a change of heart. He performed surgery on Washington, ultimately saving his life, but in the process poisoned him with calomel. The poison caused him to lose all of his hair permanently. In later pictures, he is shown wearing wigs. He recovered at the Columbia Barracks for 3–4 months. When he recovered, he and the Cochrans moved back to the Milwaukie area, where eventually Washington settled his parents into a cabin close to Cowlitz Landing.

Washington then left looking to settle his own land in the Olympia, Steilacoom, and Seattle regions of the territory. Although the law stood between Washington making a claim, he had the support of more than 100 pioneers who petitioned on his behalf to let him stay on the land of the Oregon Territory. Although the petition was heard in court, the amendment to let Blacks stay in the Oregon territory failed. Luckily for Washington, the petition to allow him to stay was barely passed with a 17–6 vote. However, on March 2, 1853, the Washington Territory which Washington eventually would make his claim in was made official and had no laws of exclusion.

== Founding of Centralia, Washington ==
Washington then left Oregon and settled near the confluence of the Chehalis and Skookumchuck Rivers, and the Cochrans claimed the land for the family. When the Washington Territory was split from the Oregon Territory in 1853, the new territory's statutes did not preclude African-Americans from owning land, and the Cochrans sold their land to him for $6,000. George cared for his adoptive parents for the rest of their lives. In his fifties, Washington married Mary Jane Cain Cooness, who was of African American and Jewish heritage, and was a divorcee. He helped raise her son, Stacey.

Anticipating the arrival of the Northern Pacific railroad in 1872, Washington had visions of a town on the southeast corner of his land. Saying that it was the center point between Kalama and Tacoma, he named his settlement the city of Centerville and filing a plat that officially created the town in 1875. He named the streets after biblical references and set aside land for a park (now the site of the Carnegie Library) and churches of many denominations. The town was incorporated as Centralia, Washington, in 1886 after it was discovered that another town in the territory already bore the name Centerville (although that town has since changed its name to Stanwood). This made Washington the only black person to found a town in the Pacific Northwest. Washington was the proponent of steady growth using fair business practices. Some said that he spoke in such an honest and straightforward way that buyers would become suspicious.

Despite facing some racial prejudice at the hands of newcomers, many of whom migrated from the segregated post-Civil War South, Washington supported many of the townspeople through the Panic of 1893, when the Northern Pacific went bankrupt and the town nearly collapsed. When members of the original church in the community, built on land Washington donated, would refuse to attend services if he was present, Washington created a second church.

== Death ==
The town thrived in the boom started by the Klondike Gold Rush in 1898, and by the time he died in 1905 at the age of 88, Centralia had grown to a town of around 5,000 residents, who turned out en masse to honor him at his funeral. He is buried in the town's Washington Lawn Cemetery.

== Honors ==
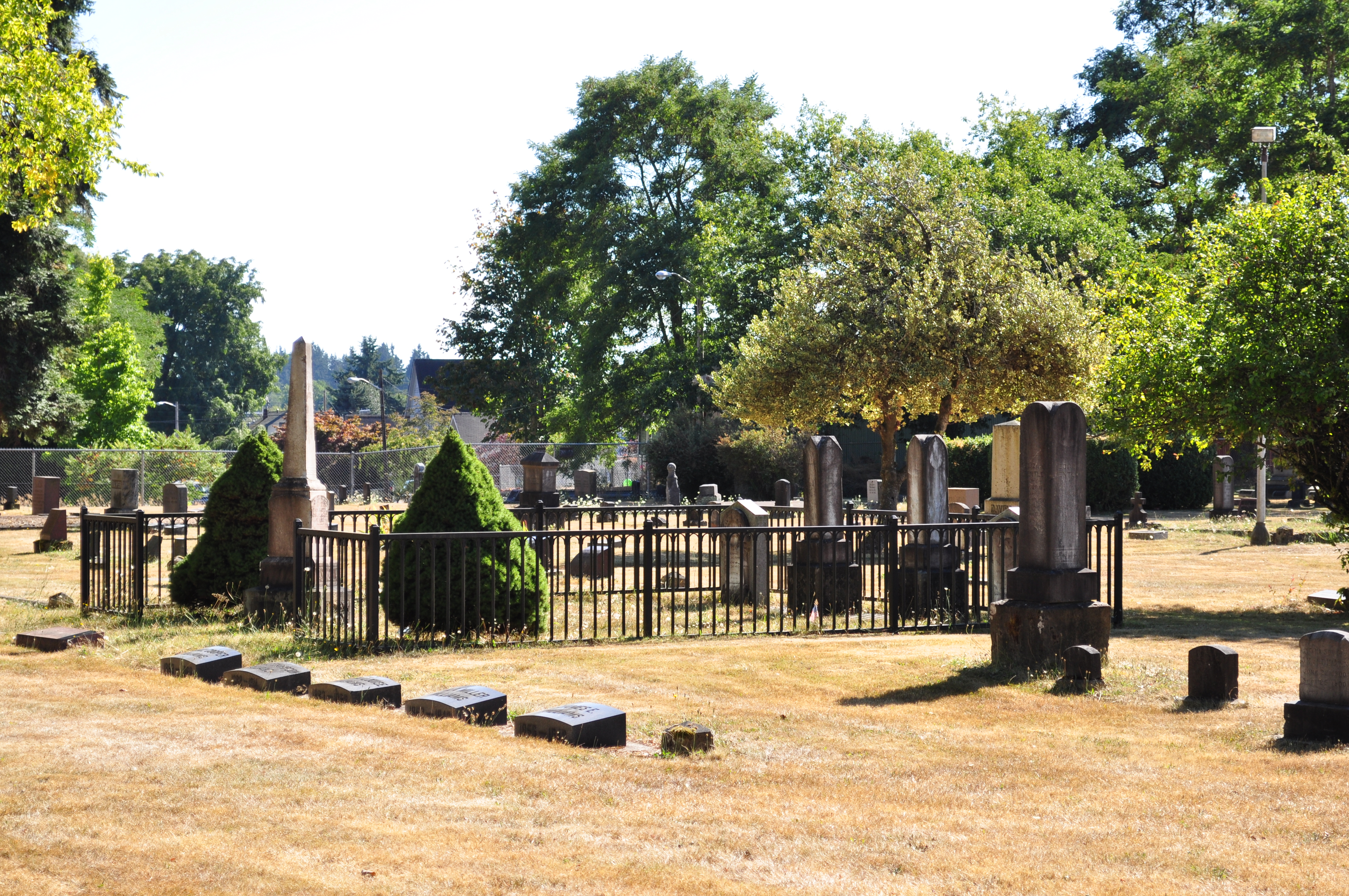
Centralia's Washington Lawn Cemetery, the burial place of George Washington, his family, and the Cochrans.

Centralia has a number of memorials to its founder, including a large stone monument telling his life story in the city's central plaza (a park donated by George and Mary Jane Washington, known as George Washington Park). During a year-long celebration of his 200th birthday, volunteers erected a bronze statue of George and Mary Jane Washington that was placed in George Washington Park in August 2018. His burial plot is located in Washington Lawn Cemetery, named after his family.

The city, in 2023, unanimously approved that August 15 would be known as Founder's Day. The date was chosen to match Washington's recorded birthday.

== See also ==
- George Washington Bush
