= Liem Tuai =

American politician (1925-2003)

Liem Eng Tuai
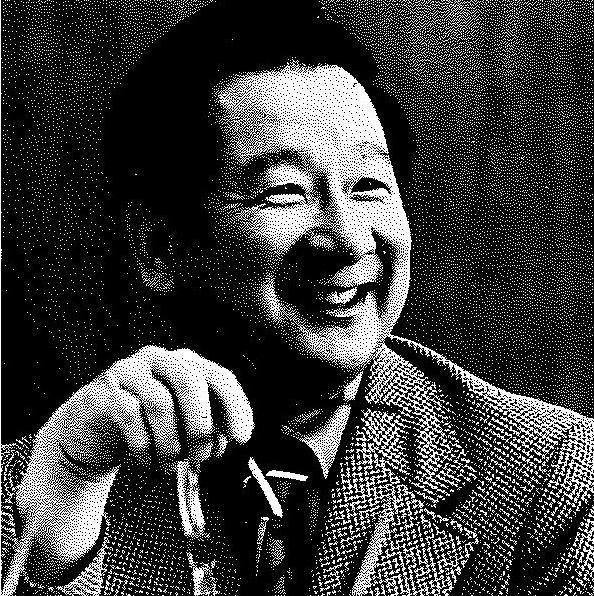

Judge of the King County Superior Court
- In office 1977 – April 1, 1996

President of the Seattle City Council
- In office 1972 – October 2, 1973
- Preceded by: Charles M. Carroll
- Succeeded by: Sam Smith

Member of the Seattle City Council from District 4
- In office May 19, 1969 – October 2, 1973
- Preceded by: Paul Jacob Alexander
- Succeeded by: George Benson

Personal details
- Born: 1925 Port Townsend, Washington
- Died: March 2, 2003 (aged 77) Seattle, Washington
- Party: Republican
- Spouse: Winnie Joyce Eng
- Children: 3 sons
- Education: University of Washington (BA, JD)

Liem Eng Tuai (1925–2003) was a member of the Seattle City Council from 1969 to 1973. In 1977, he was appointed a judge in the King County Superior Court and served until 1996.

== Early life and education ==
Tuai was born in Port Townsend, Washington in 1925, the son of working-class Chinese immigrants. He dropped out of Bremerton High School to work at Boeing as a machinist and at the family restaurant. He then joined the US Air Force in Japan from 1946 to 1950 as a photographer and finished high school while in the military. After serving in the military, Tuai used the G.I. Bill to enroll in the University of Washington, earning his bachelor's degree in 1954 and a Juris Doctor in 1956.

In 1958, Tuai was hired in the King County Attorney's Office as a deputy prosecuting attorney, the first Chinese-American to hold this position. He would also hold a position in the General Services Administration and work as a private attorney.

== Political career ==
In May 1969, councilmember Paul Jacob Alexander died of a sudden heart attack while at a conference in Washington, D.C.. On May 19, 1969, Tuai, a Republican, was appointed to fill the seat to preserve the political makeup of the council. He would become the second Chinese-American to serve on the city council after Wing Luke. Tuai ran for the full term and in the November general election Taui won in a landslide against W.G. Gordon, 74% to 26%.

Tuai was a self-described moderate Republican who was fiscally conservative and pro-business. He supported mandatory five-year sentences for drug dealing and opposed legislation requiring businesses to hire strikebreakers.

During the groundbreaking for the Seattle Kingdome, Tuai and other city and county leaders faced protestors who said the Kingdome would harm the surrounding communities, including the Chinatown–International District. the protestors accused Tuai of being a sellout and got into heated arguments with speakers while throwing mudballs at them.

In 1972, Tuai was appointed council president and served until his resignation in 1973. On October 2, 1973, he resigned from the city council to run for mayor against incumbent Wesley C. Uhlman. In the November general election, Tuai lost to Uhlman, 51.3% to 48.6%. In 1974, he lost election for a seat on the Washington Supreme Court and in 1975 he would lose his election to rejoin the council to council member John Miller.

== King County Superior Court ==
In 1977, Tuai was appointed by Governor Dixy Lee Ray to one of five newly created King County Superior Court positions. He planned on retiring in 1995 but decided to retire in 1996 to help the county reduce the high caseload.

== Personal life ==
Tuai met his wife, Winnie Joyce Eng, in 1950 and were married five months later. They were married for 46 years until she died of lung cancer in 1997. They had three sons together.

On March 2, 2003, Tuai died of lung cancer.
