= Washington's 37th legislative district =

American legislative district

Coordinates: 47°32′N 122°16′W

Map of Washington's 37th legislative district

Washington's 37th legislative district is one of forty-nine districts in Washington state for representation in the state legislature.

The district encompasses Beacon Hill, Central District, Rainier Valley, Columbia City, Rainier Beach, and Renton.

The district's legislators are state senator Rebecca Saldaña and state representatives Sharon Tomiko Santos (position 1) and Chipalo Street (position 2), all Democrats.

On December 12, 2016, Rebecca Saldaña was selected to fill Pramila Jayapal's seat in the senate over Rory O'Sullivan and Shasti Conrad following a special appointment by the King County Council. Jayapal had recommended Saldaña for her replacement, stating "Rebecca is a proven and effective leader – she has gotten results on some of the toughest issues our community faces. I strongly support her appointment to the State Senate."

== See also ==
- Charles Stokes
- Michael Ross
- Sam Smith
- Washington Redistricting Commission
- Washington State Legislature
- Washington State Senate
- Washington House of Representatives
