= Michael Ross (Washington politician) =

American politician (1941–2007)

Michael K. Ross
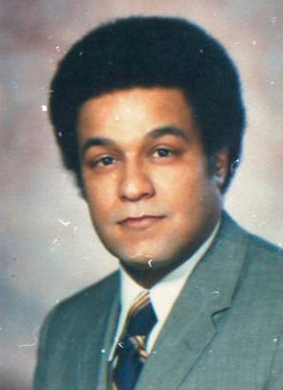
- Michael K. Ross

Member of the Washington House of Representatives from the 37th district
- In office 1971–1973

Personal details
- Born: July 14, 1941 Iowa City, Iowa, U.S.
- Died: August 21, 2007 (aged 66) Seattle, Washington, U.S.
- Citizenship: United States
- Party: Republican
- Children: Michael Kay, Michael Chavez, Adam
- Parent(s): Carl Ross, Violet Phinisse Scott
- Occupation: Activist, Politician

Michael K. Ross (July 14, 1941 – August 21, 2007) was an American civil rights activist, construction worker, and member of the Washington House of Representatives who served from 1970 to 1972. He is the last Republican to have been elected from Washington's 37th legislative district.

== Early life ==
Ross was born in Iowa City, Iowa to Carl Ross and Violet Phinisse Scott, and was raised in Flint, Michigan and Los Angeles, California. From 1958 to 1960 he served in the United States Air Force. After briefly attending Washburn Community College in Topeka, Kansas, he relocated to Virginia to work for Martin Luther King Jr.'s "Get Out the Vote" campaign. In 1967 he moved to Washington state out of a desire to escape the discrimination he had suffered elsewhere as a result of his brief marriage to a Caucasian woman.

In Seattle, Ross became involved with the local chapter of the Congress of Racial Equality, and was eventually elected president of the chapter. In an interview with the Seattle Post-Intelligencer about black activism at the University of Washington, Ross criticized African Americans "that have been homogenized by the university and who now serve as spokesmen and leaders for the black community because whites feel at ease with them." Later, Ross would join in demonstrations demanding the University of Washington terminate athletic contacts with Brigham Young University.

== Political career ==
Michael Ross meets with Washington's then governor Dan Evans in 1971.

In 1970 Ross ran as a Republican for an open seat in the Washington House of Representatives from the 37th Legislative District, facing Democrat Marion King Smith, the wife of former longtime state legislator Sam Smith. Smith had earlier left the legislature to run for Seattle City Council. Ross won a surprise victory in the heavily Democratic-leaning 37th district over Marion King Smith; Sam Smith would later attribute Ross' victory over his wife to a defection of Smith's traditional allies among the district's black leaders who were "afraid that the power in the black community was too centered on me. They knew I would be helping her [Marion] make decisions, and they didn't want me to have that kind of reach."

After he took office, Ross was appointed by Governor Daniel J. Evans, a fellow Republican, to the state's law and justice planning committee, an executive branch advisory body. He grabbed headlines on a number of occasions due to his radical politics and firebrand activism. In 1972 he introduced what is believed to be the first bill to legalize the recreational use of marijuana, four decades before the drug was ultimately legalized in Washington, and, later, drove an armed contingent of Black Panthers in a state-owned vehicle to Rainier Beach High School during a period of racial tensions. On another occasion he was arrested for helping to topple a bulldozer in protest of the lack of racial diversity among contractors working on the construction of Seattle Central Community College. Ross introduced the ultimately successful "Betsy Ross resolution," which required the United States flag be carried by a female legislative page when posting the colors before the Washington legislature (previous state custom required the federal colors be carried by a male and the state colors by a female).

Ross sought a second term in the legislature, but was defeated by Democrat John Eng. The following year, in 1973, he ran for Seattle City Council. Ross' ultimately unsuccessful campaign was managed by then-high school student Dino Rossi, who would go on to be the Republican nominee for Governor of Washington in 2004 and 2008. In 1985 Ross attempted a comeback when he ran as the Republican candidate for King County Council district 5, ultimately losing to Democrat Ron Sims.

== Later life ==
After leaving politics, Ross founded two different construction companies, which experienced varying degrees of success. He later served as executive-director of the United Inner City Development Foundation, worked for the United States Department of Energy and, toward the end of his life, served as a minority liaison for Seattle Vocational Institute.

Ross died of a heart attack in 2007.

== See also ==
- Charles Stokes - Republican legislator from the 37th district from 1950-1954
