= Phyllis Lamphere =

American politician

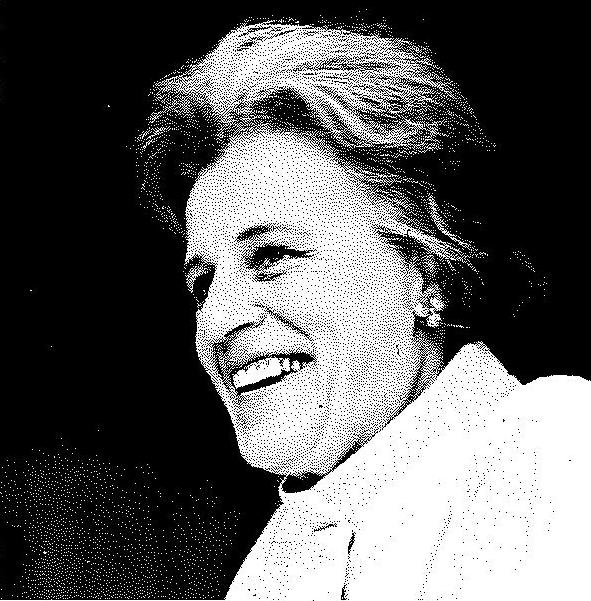

Member of the Seattle City Council
- In office 1968–1979

51st President of the National League of Cities
- In office 1977
- Preceded by: Hans Tanzler
- Succeeded by: Tom Moody

Personal details
- Born: Phyllis Hagmoe; February 9, 1922 Seattle, Washington, US
- Died: November 13, 2018 (aged 96) Seattle, Washington, US
- Education: Barnard College
- Occupation: Politician, activist

Phyllis Lee Hagmoe Lamphere (February 9, 1922 – November 13, 2018) was an American politician and civic activist. She was a longtime member of the Seattle City Council and was the first woman to lead the National League of Cities.

== Early life ==
Lamphere was born Phyllis Lee Hagmoe on February 9, 1922, in Seattle, Washington. Her father, Ernest Archibald Hagmoe, initially worked in the local water department, but lost his job due to his alcoholism. Her mother, Minnie Hagmoe, was a public servant who worked a series of jobs throughout the Great Depression with the state welfare office, the Works Progress Administration, the Seattle War Commission, the city's voter registration and license offices and the King County tax department. Lamphere studied at Interlake Grade School and Lincoln High School, before receiving a scholarship to Barnard College in 1939. She received a degree in mathematics from the college in 1943, where she also studied under dancer Martha Graham.

== Career ==
After graduating from Barnard College, Lamphere worked for IBM and Boeing, where she was director of women's activities, before entering politics. Lamphere was active in the League of Women Voters and lobbied the Seattle City Council to pass a bill that placed budget decisions under the mayor's authority. She won a seat on the city council in 1967 and remained on the council for 11 years. She helped pass an "Open Housing" law banning housing discrimination in Seattle in 1968 and lobbied for the building of the West Seattle Bridge.

In 1977, Lamphere became the first non-mayor and first woman to be president of the National League of Cities, and ran for mayor of Seattle, coming in fourth in the primary.

After leaving the council, Lamphere served as regional director of the Economic Development Administration and was named in 1980 to a team tasked with building the Washington State Convention Center, where the Phyllis Lamphere Gallery was named after her. She also helped the Museum of History & Industry relocate to its present location in South Lake Union, Seattle. She was also a board member of Virginia Mason Medical Center, Museum of History & Industry, and a board member of the Washington State Convention Center from 1982 to 2002.

== Personal life ==
Lamphere was married five times. She lived at the Horizon House retirement center, where she remained active in civic affairs and mobilized retirees in her 90s. She died on November 13, 2018, at age 96.
