= Electoral history of Jay Inslee =

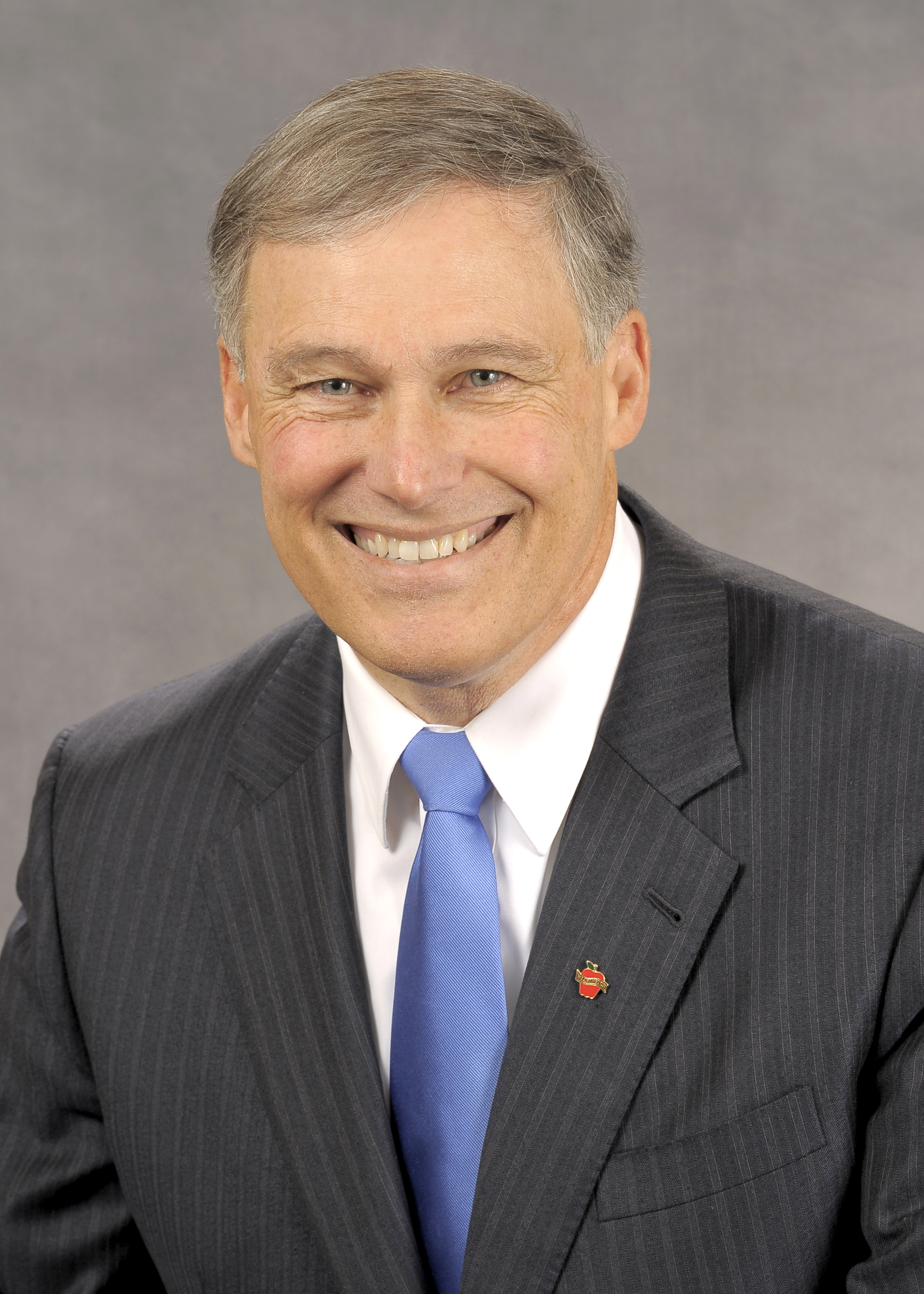
Official portrait of Washington state governor Jay Inslee.

This is the electoral history of Jay Inslee, the 23rd Governor of Washington since 2013. He previously served in the Washington House of Representatives from 1989 to 1993. He was also a member of the United States House of Representatives from Washington's 4th congressional district from 1993 to 1995 and from Washington's 1st congressional district from 1999 to 2012. Inslee sought the 2020 Democratic nomination for President and centered his candidacy around climate change, but ended his campaign before voting began.

== Washington House of Representatives elections ==
=== 1988 ===
Washington House of Representatives District 14 Position #2, 1988 Jungle Primary
Party	Candidate	Votes	%
Republican	Lynn Charmichael	9,210	42.83%
Democratic	Jay Inslee	8,624	40.11%
Republican	Glen W. Blomgren	3,668	17.06%
Total votes		21,502	100%

Washington House of Representatives District 14 Position #2, 1988 General Election
Party	Candidate	Votes	%
Democratic	Jay Inslee	17,114	51.64%
Republican	Lynn Charmichael	16,028	48.36%
Total votes		33,142	100%
Democratic gain from Republican			

=== 1990 ===
Washington House of Representatives District 14 Position #2, 1990 Jungle Primary
Party	Candidate	Votes	%
Democratic	Jay Inslee (incumbent)	10,358	58.94%
Republican	Ted Mellotte	7,216	41.06%
Total votes		17,574	100%

Washington House of Representatives District 14 Position #2, 1990 General Election
Party	Candidate	Votes	%
Democratic	Jay Inslee (incumbent)	16,395	61.82%
Republican	Ted Mellotte	10,125	38.18%
Total votes		26,520	100%
Democratic hold			

== U.S. House of Representatives elections ==
=== 1992 ===
Washington's 4th congressional district, 1992 Jungle Primary
Party	Candidate	Votes	%
Republican	Doc Hastings	28,952	23.86%
Democratic	Jay Inslee	27,429	22.61%
Democratic	Jim Jesernig	26,320	21.69%
Republican	Alex McLean	13,605	11.21%
Republican	Jeffrey C. Sullivan	12,074	9.95%
Republican	Bill Almon	9,168	7.56%
Democratic	Joe Walkenhauer	3,774	3.11%
Total votes		121,322	100%

Washington's 4th congressional district, 1992 General Election
Party	Candidate	Votes	%
Democratic	Jay Inslee	106,556	50.84%
Republican	Doc Hastings	103,028	49.16%
Total votes		209,584	100%
Democratic gain from Republican			

=== 1994 ===
Washington's 4th congressional district, 1994 Jungle Primary
Party	Candidate	Votes	%
Republican	Doc Hastings	50,343	49.51%
Democratic	Jay Inslee (incumbent)	41,917	41.22%
Democratic	Craig L. Williams	9,431	9.27%
Total votes		101,691	100%

Washington's 4th congressional district, 1994 General Election
Party	Candidate	Votes	%
Republican	Doc Hastings	92,828	53.34%
Democratic	Jay Inslee (incumbent)	81,198	46.66%
Total votes		174,026	100%
Republican gain from Democratic			

=== 1998 ===
Washington's 1st congressional district, 1998 Jungle Primary
Party	Candidate	Votes	%
Republican	Rick White (incumbent)	59,636	49.58%
Democratic	Jay Inslee	52,602	43.73%
American Heritage	Bruce Craswell	8,051	6.69%
Total votes		120,289	100%

Washington's 1st congressional district, 1998 General Election
Party	Candidate	Votes	%
Democratic	Jay Inslee	112,726	49.77%
Republican	Rick White (incumbent)	99,910	44.12%
American Heritage	Bruce Craswell	13,837	6.11%
Total votes		226,473	100%
Democratic gain from Republican			

=== 2000 ===
Washington's 1st congressional district, 2000 Jungle Primary
Party	Candidate	Votes	%
Democratic	Jay Inslee (incumbent)	80,362	55.57%
Republican	Dan McDonald	60,303	41.70%
Libertarian	Bruce Newman	3,950	2.73%
Total votes		144,615	100%

Washington's 1st congressional district, 2000 General Election
Party	Candidate	Votes	%
Democratic	Jay Inslee (incumbent)	155,820	54.55%
Republican	Dan McDonald	121,823	42.65%
Libertarian	Bruce Newman	7,993	2.80%
Total votes		285,636	100%
Democratic hold			

=== 2002 ===
Washington's 1st congressional district, 2002 Jungle Primary
Party	Candidate	Votes	%
Democratic	Jay Inslee (incumbent)	65,368	56.28%
Republican	Joseph Marine	42,473	36.57%
Democratic	Mike The Mover	5,291	4.56%
Libertarian	Mark B. Wilson	3,025	2.60%
Total votes		144,615	100%

Washington's 1st congressional district, 2002 General Election
Party	Candidate	Votes	%
Democratic	Jay Inslee (incumbent)	114,087	55.64%
Republican	Joseph Marine	84,696	41.31%
Libertarian	Mark B. Wilson	6,251	3.05%
Total votes		205,034	100%
Democratic hold			

=== 2004 ===
Washington's 1st congressional district, 2004 Jungle Primary
Party	Candidate	Votes	%
Democratic	Jay Inslee (incumbent)	89,168	63.23%
Republican	Randy Eastwood	50,050	35.49%
Libertarian	Charles Moore	1,803	1.28%
Total votes		141,021	100%

Washington's 1st congressional district, 2004 General Election
Party	Candidate	Votes	%
Democratic	Jay Inslee (incumbent)	204,121	62.28%
Republican	Randy Eastwood	117,850	35.96%
Libertarian	Charles Moore	5,798	1.77%
Total votes		327,769	100%
Democratic hold			

=== 2006 ===
Washington's 1st congressional district, 2006 Jungle Primary
Party	Candidate	Votes	%
Democratic	Jay Inslee (incumbent)	75,644	65.54%
Republican	Larry W. Ishmael	39,592	34.36%
Total votes		115,236	100%

Washington's 1st congressional district, 2006 General Election
Party	Candidate	Votes	%
Democratic	Jay Inslee (incumbent)	163,832	67.72%
Republican	Larry Ishmael	78,105	32.28%
Total votes		241,937	100%
Democratic hold			

=== 2008 ===
Washington's 1st congressional district, 2008 Jungle Primary
Party	Candidate	Votes	%
Democratic	Jay Inslee (incumbent)	104,342	66.44%
Republican	Larry Ishmael	52,700	33.56%
Total votes		157,042	100%

Washington's 1st congressional district, 2008 General Election
Party	Candidate	Votes	%
Democratic	Jay Inslee (incumbent)	233,780	67.76%
Republican	Larry Ishmael	111,240	32.24%
Total votes		345,020	100%
Democratic hold			

=== 2010 ===
Washington's 1st congressional district, 2010 Jungle Primary
Party	Candidate	Votes	%
Democratic	Jay Inslee (incumbent)	90,208	55.85%
Republican	James Watkins	44,269	27.41%
Republican	Matthew Burke	20,185	12.50%
Independent	David D. Schirle	6,864	4.25%
Total votes		161,526	100%

Washington's 1st congressional district, 2010 General Election
Party	Candidate	Votes	%
Democratic	Jay Inslee (incumbent)	172,642	57.67%
Republican	James Watkins	126,737	42.33%
Total votes		299,379	100%
Democratic hold			

== Washington gubernatorial elections ==
=== 1996 ===
1996 Washington gubernatorial jungle primary
Party	Candidate	Votes	%
Democratic	Gary Locke	287,762	23.65%
Democratic	Norm Rice	212,888	17.50%
Republican	Ellen Craswell	185,680	15.26%
Republican	Dale Foreman	162,615	13.37%
Democratic	Jay Inslee	118,571	9.75%
Republican	Norm Maleng	109,088	8.97%
Republican	Jim Waldo	63,584	5.25%
Republican	Pam Roach	29,533	2.43%
Republican	Nona Brazier	21,237	1.75%
Democratic	Brian Zetlen	6,152	0.51%
Republican	Warren E. Hanson	4,886	0.40%
Republican	Bob Tharp	4,825	0.40%
Socialist Workers	Jeff Powers	3,742	0.31%
Democratic	Mohammad H. Said	3,007	0.25%
Democratic	Max Englerius	2,837	0.23%
Total votes		1,216,407	100%

=== 2012 ===
2012 Washington gubernatorial jungle primary
Party	Candidate	Votes	%
Democratic	Jay Inslee	664,534	47.13%
Republican	Rob McKenna	604,872	42.90%
Republican	Shahram Hadian	46,169	3.27%
Democratic	Rob Hill	45,453	3.22%
Independent	James White	13,764	0.98%
Independent	Christian Joubert	10,457	0.74%
Independent	L. Dale Sorgen	9,734	0.69%
Republican	Max Sampson	8,753	0.62%
Republican	Javier O. Lopez	6,131	0.43%
Total votes		1,409,867	100%

2012 Washington gubernatorial general election
Party	Candidate	Votes	%
Democratic	Jay Inslee	1,582,802	51.54%
Republican	Rob McKenna	1,488,245	48.46%
Total votes		3,071,047	100.0%
Democratic hold			

=== 2016 ===
2016 Washington gubernatorial jungle primary
Party	Candidate	Votes	%
Democratic	Jay Inslee (incumbent)	687,412	49.30%
Republican	Bill Bryant	534,519	38.33%
Republican	Bill Hirt	48,382	3.47%
Democratic	Patrick O'Rourke	40,572	2.91%
Independent	Steve Rubenstein	22,582	1.62%
Democratic	James Robert Deal	14,623	1.05%
Democratic	Johnathan Dodds	14,152	1.01%
Republican	Goodspaceguy	13,191	0.95%
Socialist Workers	Mary Martin	10,374	0.74%
Independent	David Blomstrom	4,512	0.32%
Independent	Christian Joubert	4,103	0.29%
Total votes		1,394,422	100%

2016 Washington gubernatorial general election
Party	Candidate	Votes	%
Democratic	Jay Inslee (incumbent)	1,760,520	54.25%
Republican	Bill Bryant	1,476,346	45.49%
Write-in		8,416	0.26%
Total votes		3,245,282	100.00%
Democratic hold			

=== 2020 ===
2020 Washington gubernatorial jungle primary
Party	Candidate	Votes	%
Democratic	Jay Inslee (incumbent)	1,247,916	50.14%
Republican	Loren Culp	433,238	17.41%
Republican	Joshua Freed	222,553	8.94%
Republican	Tim Eyman	159,495	6.41%
Republican	Raul Garcia	135,045	5.43%
Republican	Phil Fortunato	99,265	3.99%
Democratic	Don L. Rivers	25,601	1.03%
Trump Republican Party	Leon Aaron Lawson	23,073	0.93%
Green	Liz Hallock	21,537	0.87%
Democratic	Cairo D'Almeida	14,657	0.59%
Trump Republican Party	Anton Sakharov	13,935	0.56%
Pre2016 Republican Party	Nate Herzog	11,303	0.45%
Democratic	Gene Hart	10,605	0.43%
Democratic	Omari Tahir Garrett	8,751	0.35%
Unaffiliated Party	Ryan Ryals	6,264	0.25%
Socialist Workers	Henry Clay Dennison	5,970	0.24%
Trump Republican Party	Goodspaceguy	5,646	0.23%
Republican	Richard L. Carpenter	4,962	0.2%
Independent	Elaina J. Gonzales	4,772	0.19%
Republican	Matthew Murray	4,489	0.18%
Independent	Thor Amundson	3,638	0.15%
Republican	Bill Hirt	2,854	0.11%
Republican	Martin L. Wheeler	2,686	0.11%
Republican	Ian Gonzales	2,537	0.1%
New-Liberty Party	Joshua Wolf	2,315	0.09%
No Party Preference	Cregan M. Newhouse	2,291	0.09%
No Party Preference	Brian R. Weed	2,178	0.09%
StandupAmerica Party	Alex Tsimerman	1,721	0.07%
Republican	Tylor Grow	1,509	0.06%
Independent	Dylan B. Nails	1,470	0.06%
Independent	Craig Campbell	1,178	0.05%
American Patriot Party	William Miller	1,148	0.05%
No Party Preference	Cameron M. Vessey	718	0.03%
Propertarianist Party	Winston Wilkes	702	0.03%
Fifth Republic Party	David W. Blomstrom	519	0.02%
Cascadia Labour Party	David Voltz	480	0.02%
Write-in		1,938	0.08%
Total votes		2,488,959	100%

2020 Washington gubernatorial general election
Party	Candidate	Votes	%
Democratic	Jay Inslee (incumbent)	2,294,243	56.56%
Republican	Loren Culp	1,749,066	43.12%
Write-in		13,145	0.32%
Total votes		4,056,454	100.00%
Democratic hold			
