= Sid Morrison =

American politician (1933–2026)

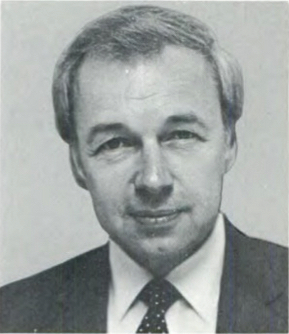

Washington Secretary of Transportation
- In office January 27, 1993 – April 23, 2001
- Governor: Mike Lowry; Gary Locke
- Preceded by: Duane Berentson
- Succeeded by: Douglas MacDonald

Member of the U.S. House of Representatives from Washington's 4th district
- In office January 3, 1981 – January 3, 1993
- Preceded by: Mike McCormack
- Succeeded by: Jay Inslee

Member of the Washington Senate from the 15th district
- In office January 13, 1975 – November 12, 1980
- Preceded by: Perry Woodall
- Succeeded by: Irv Newhouse

Member of the Washington House of Representatives from the 15th district
- In office January 9, 1967 – January 13, 1975
- Preceded by: Damon Canfield
- Succeeded by: Alex Deccio

Personal details
- Born: Sidney Wallace Morrison; May 13, 1933 Yakima, Washington, U.S.
- Died: November 10, 2026 (aged 93)
- Party: Republican
- Spouse: Marcella Britton (m. 1955; died 2016)
- Children: 2
- Education: Yakima Valley College; Washington State University (BS)

Military service
- Allegiance: United States
- Branch: United States Army
- Service years: 1954–1956

Sidney Wallace Morrison (May 13, 1933 – November 10, 2026) was an American farmer and politician who served as a member of the United States House of Representatives from 1981 to 1993. He was a member of the Republican Party.

Morrison had previously served in both chambers of the Washington State Legislature and later served as Secretary of the Washington State Department of Transportation under Governors Mike Lowry and Gary Locke.

He unsuccessfully ran for the Republican nomination for governor of Washington in 1992.

== Early life and education ==
Born in Yakima, Washington, on May 13, 1933, Morrison attended public schools in Toppenish, Washington and was admitted to Yakima Valley College in 1951. In 1954, he graduated from Washington State University in Pullman with a Bachelor of Science degree, where he was a member of the Tau Kappa Epsilon fraternity. He served in the United States Army from 1954 to 1956.

Morrison during his tenure in the state House of Representatives

== Career ==
After his discharge from the Army, Morrison was a partner in his family's fruit distribution business. From 1966 to 1974, Morrison was a member of the Washington House of Representatives, representing the 15th district. He served the 15th district in the Washington Senate from 1974 until 1980.

After his election to the 97th United States Congress in 1980, Morrison became a member of the House Energy and Agriculture Committees. He served representing Washington's 4th congressional district for six terms from 1981 to 1993. In 1992 Morrison was a candidate for governor, but he was defeated in the primary by Ken Eikenberry. Eikenberry was subsequently defeated in the general election by Seattle congressman Mike Lowry.

In early 1993, Morrison was appointed by Governor Mike Lowry to serve as the Secretary of the Washington State Department of Transportation. Morrison left office in 2001.

Morrison was the chair of the Mainstream Republicans of Washington, a centrist PAC. In March, 2005, he was appointed to the Board of Trustees for Central Washington University.

== Personal life and death ==
Morrison and his wife, Marcella, had two children. He was a resident of Zillah, Washington. He died on November 10, 2026, at the age of 93.

U.S. House of Representatives
Preceded by Mike McCormack	Member of the U.S. House of Representatives from Washington's 4th congressional district 1981–1993	Succeeded by Jay Inslee
