= Washington State Republican Party =

Washington State affiliate of the Republican Party

- Chairperson: Jim Walsh
- Vice Chair: Michelle Belkot
- Senate Leader: John Braun
- House Leader: Drew Stokesbary
- Founded: 1890
- Headquarters: Bellevue, Washington
- National affiliation: Republican Party
- Colors: Green, Blue
- U.S. Senate delegation: 0 / 2
- U.S. House delegation: 2 / 10
- Statewide offices: 0 / 9
- Washington Senate: 19 / 49
- Washington House: 39 / 98

Website
- www.wagop.org

The Washington State Republican Party (WSRP) is the state affiliate of the national United States Republican Party, headquartered in Bellevue.

Washington is considered a blue state, with the WSRP holding no statewide offices, two out of the state's 10 U.S. house seats, and minorities of both houses of the state legislature as of 2024. No state has gone longer without a Republican governor than Washington. Democrats have controlled the governorship for 41 years; the last Republican governor was John Spellman, who left office in 1985. Washington has not voted for a Republican senator, governor, or presidential candidate since 1994, tying with Delaware for the longest streak in the country.

Since 2016, the WSRP and its voter base have undergone a hard right-wing shift in their political and social views. This has led to a further loss of electoral power for the party.

== History ==
=== Campaigns and elections ===
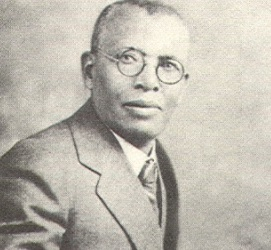
Horace Cayton founded and published The Seattle Republican, an early party mouthpiece.

Washington voters tend to support Democratic Party candidates, with The New York Times referring to the state as "Democratopolis." The last Republican governor in Washington was John Spellman, who held office from 1981 to 1985. Republicans came closest to recapturing the state's chief executive office in 2004 when Democrat Christine Gregoire secured election by just 133 votes out of 2.8 million cast. The last time Washington gave its electoral votes to a Republican candidate for U.S. president was in 1984, when a majority in the state voted for Ronald Reagan.

==== Early years ====
The early history of the state saw firm electoral dominance by the Republican Party. In 1889, Republicans prevailed in the first election for governor and scored majorities in both chambers of the inaugural state legislature. William Owen Bush, Washington's first African-American legislator, is credited with introducing the legislation that led to the establishment of Washington State University. Elected as a Republican from Thurston County, Bush was known as a tireless promoter of Washington agriculture. Republican policies in the early period of statehood were advanced by the party-connected Seattle Post-Intelligencer and, later, by The Seattle Republican. Founded by ex-slave Horace Cayton, The Seattle Republican would grow to become the second-largest newspaper in Seattle before it folded in 1917. "The success of the Republican Party is one of its highest ambitions," Cayton said of his publication.

In 1922 Republican Reba Hurn of Spokane became the first woman elected to the Washington State Senate, serving from 1923 to 1930. Hurn advocated for conservative fiscal policies and was a supporter of prohibition, but otherwise espoused a generally liberal social agenda, helping to pass the state's first child labor laws. Charles M. Stokes became the first African-American elected to the state legislature from King County in 1950. He led the Republican Party delegation to the 1952 Republican National Convention where he spoke in support of Dwight Eisenhower's presidential nomination and later introduced the legislation that created Washington's Lottery.

==== Resurgence ====
After a period of declining fortunes, in 1964 Republican Dan Evans was elected governor at the age of 39, becoming the youngest person to hold the state's chief executive office. The architect of Evans' victory, C. Montgomery Johnson., became the party's first full-time chairman. Johnson, a former forest ranger, publicist for Weyerhauser, early pro-choice advocate and champion of limited government, led a purge of John Birch Society members from the Washington Republican party, declaring afterward that "we had to make the term 'conservative' respectable again. The only way to do it was to get the far right off the backs of conservatives. The Republican Party is not the far-right."

In 1971 Johnson quit the party chairmanship to form a political consulting firm. With the warning that future tolerance of the John Birch Society would be "the instrument of Republican defeat - statewide, regionally, and locally," party leaders elected Johnson's political ally, Earl Davenport, to replace him as party head. The election, the same year, of Republican Michael Ross from Seattle's 37th legislative district foreshadowed eventual changes in Washington state law. The former treasurer of the Seattle chapter of the Congress of Racial Equality, Ross grabbed headlines when he introduced a bill to legalize marijuana. (While the measure failed, Washington would eventually become the first state to legalize the manufacture and sale of marijuana in 2012.) During a period of racial tensions at Rainier Beach High School, Ross commandeered a state vehicle and drove a contingent of armed Black Panthers to the school to protect African-American students. In 1973 Ross attempted an unsuccessful bid for Seattle City Council. One of his campaign volunteers in that contest was the Republican party's 2004 and 2008 gubernatorial nominee Dino Rossi.

Republican state legislator Michael Ross meets with Washington's then governor Dan Evans, another Republican, in 1971.

==== Modern era ====
The Republican Revolution of 1994 helped party candidates score an unprecedented seven of the state's nine seats in the U.S. House of Representatives. In Washington's 5th congressional district Republican George Nethercutt unseated Tom Foley, the incumbent Speaker of the United States House of Representatives. Foley's defeat marked the first time a sitting Speaker had been defeated in a reelection in 132 years. Another Republican elevated to national office as a result of the 1994 elections was Jack Metcalf. Described by The Seattle Times as "the vestige of a certain place the Northwest used to be," Metcalf typified the unconventional characteristics for which Washington Republicans had previously been known. One of the few Republicans in the late 1990s endorsed by organized labor, Metcalf blended fiscal conservatism with environmental advocacy, working with the anti-whaling group Sea Shepherd Conservation Society and sponsoring an abortive effort to require labeling of genetically modified foods.

The Washington state Republican party has, in recent years, struggled with internal divisions between its historic core of social liberals and a strengthening contingent of religious conservatives. The party's 1996 gubernatorial candidate, paleoconservative Ellen Craswell, won the Republican nomination by only a slim margin before being soundly defeated in the general election by Democrat Gary Locke. Craswell would ultimately quit the party to help form the American Heritage Party. Concerns about increasing social conservatism in the party led state legislators Fred Jarrett and Rodney Tom to drop their Republican affiliation in the late 2000s and join the Democratic Party.

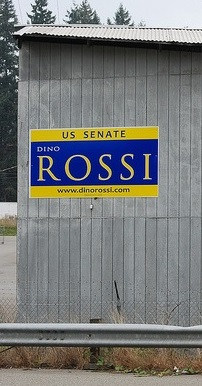
A campaign sign for Republican Dino Rossi's unsuccessful 2010 race for U.S. Senate.

Eastern Washington is considered a stronghold of the party. Republican candidates have also performed well in the eastern half of King County and in Seattle's affluent Madison Park neighborhood in the past. Among the largest recent financial backers of the party's activities are the National Electrical Contractors Association, Kemper Holdings, Microsoft, real estate developer Clyde Holland, and investor Richard Alvord (Alvord's parents, meanwhile, are Democratic Party benefactors).

==== 2010s to present ====
Since 2016, the state GOP and its voter base have undergone a hard rightward shift in their political views and positions along with the embrace of Trumpism. This includes the party being completely taken over by social conservatives including gun rights and anti-abortion activists. This has led to many people on the Eastside and elsewhere in the state abandoning the party. After the 2020 Washington gubernatorial election, despite Jay Inslee's large margin of victory, Republican candidate Loren Culp refused to concede his loss and gave no concession speech, while making unsubstantiated claims of voting fraud.

After Joe Biden defeated Donald Trump in the 2020 presidential election, state Republicans were divided over Trump's false claims of election fraud, with some rejecting or embracing the claims. In the aftermath, some Republicans and county chapters have spread misinformation and conspiracy theories over the 2020 election. There has been efforts by a few Republican legislators to abolish the mail by voting system that's been used in the state for years, often claiming there was widespread election fraud. It was also reported that a Republican lawmaker proclaimed on social media to "prepare for war" and advocated for others to join following the 2020 election. In 2023, the state GOP selected Jim Walsh as their new chairman, signaling a hardline conservative shift for the party. In April 2024, the state GOP passed a resolution that claimed that America is not a democracy but a republic, stating "every time the word 'democracy' is used favorably it serves to promote the principles of the Democratic Party." Other resolutions called for terminating mail-in voting and repealing the 17th amendment, which enabled the direct election of U.S. Senators.

=== Factions and affiliated groups ===
The Washington chapter of the National Federation of Republican Women was established in 1945 and currently consists of more than 30 local Republican women's clubs. The Washington College Republican Federation has College Republicans chapters at 10 of the state's colleges and universities. Past members of the University of Washington chapter of the group have included former gubernatorial candidate John Carlson, and former state party chairmen Kirby Wilbur and Luke Esser.

An independent pressure group founded in 1990, Mainstream Republicans of Washington, advances efforts to moderate Republican policies and recruit centrist candidates. The group's members include former state legislators Gary Alexander, Steve Litzow, and Hans Zeiger. In 2005 an organization of Republican attorneys and former elected officials, the Constitutional Law PAC, was formed to advocate in state judicial elections. The current head of that organization is former U.S. Senator Slade Gorton. A Washington chapter of the Republican Liberty Caucus was organized in 2012 to push a libertarian agenda. Former state legislators Matt Shea and Jason Overstreet have been involved with the group.

Though officially non-partisan, the Olympia-based think tank Evergreen Freedom Foundation has been connected with Republican candidates and causes. When former state Auditor Brian Sonntag, a Democrat, joined the foundation as an adviser in 2013, Washington State Democratic Party chair Dwight Pelz declared Sonntag was no longer a Democrat and called on him to "pay your dues to the Republican party." Washington state has a chapter of the Log Cabin Republicans and the former executive-director of the national group, Patrick Sammon, is a native of Seattle.

== Party chairmen ==
Name	Year
Arnold S. Wang	1958–1960
William C. Goodloe	1960–1962
C. Montgomery Johnson	1964–1971
Earl Davenport	1971–1973
Ross Davis	1973–1977
Ken Eikenberry	1977–1981
Jennifer Dunn	1981–1992
Ben Bettridge	1992–1993
Ken Eikenberry	1993–1996
Dale Foreman	1996–2000
Don Benton	2000–2001
Chris Vance	2001–2006
Diane Tebelius	2006–2007
Luke Esser	2007–2011
Kirby Wilbur	2011–2013
Luanne Van Werven	2013
Susan Hutchison	2013–2018
Caleb Heimlich	2018–2023
Jim Walsh	2023–present

== Current elected officials ==
The Washington State Republican Party controls none of the nine constitutional offices and holds a minority two of the state's 10 seats in the U.S. House of Representatives. Republicans are the minority in the Washington Senate and Washington House of Representatives.

=== Member of Congress ===
==== U.S. Senate ====
- None

==== U.S. House of Representatives ====
District	Member	Photo
4th	Dan Newhouse	
4th	Amanda McKinney	
5th	Michael Baumgartner	

=== Statewide offices ===
- None

=== Legislature ===
- Senate Minority Leader: John Braun
- House Minority Leader: Drew Stokesbary

== Election results ==
=== Presidential ===
Washington Republican Party presidential election results
Election	Presidential Ticket	Votes	Vote %	Electoral votes	Result
1892	Benjamin Harrison/Whitelaw Reid	36,460	41.45%	4 / 4	Lost
1896	William McKinley/Garret Hobart	39,153	41.84%	0 / 4	Won
1900	William McKinley/Theodore Roosevelt	57,456	53.44%	4 / 4	Won
1904	Theodore Roosevelt/Charles W. Fairbanks	101,540	69.95%	5 / 5	Won
1908	William Howard Taft/James S. Sherman	106,062	57.68%	5 / 5	Won
1912	William Howard Taft/Nicholas M. Butler	70,445	21.82%	0 / 7	Lost
1916	Charles E. Hughes/Charles W. Fairbanks	167,208	43.89%	0 / 7	Lost
1920	Warren G. Harding/Calvin Coolidge	223,137	55.96%	7 / 7	Won
1924	Calvin Coolidge/Charles G. Dawes	220,224	52.24%	7 / 7	Won
1928	Herbert Hoover/Charles Curtis	335,844	67.06%	7 / 7	Won
1932	Herbert Hoover/Charles Curtis	208,645	33.94%	0 / 8	Lost
1936	Alf Landon/Frank Knox	206,892	29.88%	0 / 8	Lost
1940	Wendell Willkie/Charles L. McNary	322,123	40.58%	0 / 8	Lost
1944	Thomas E. Dewey/John W. Bricker	361,689	42.24%	0 / 8	Lost
1948	Thomas E. Dewey/Earl Warren	386,315	42.68%	0 / 8	Lost
1952	Dwight D. Eisenhower/Richard Nixon	599,107	54.33%	9 / 9	Won
1956	Dwight D. Eisenhower/Richard Nixon	620,430	53.91%	9 / 9	Won
1960	Richard Nixon/Henry Cabot Lodge Jr.	629,273	50.68%	9 / 9	Lost
1964	Barry Goldwater/William E. Miller	470,366	37.37%	0 / 9	Lost
1968	Richard Nixon/Spiro Agnew	588,510	45.12%	0 / 9	Won
1972	Richard Nixon/Spiro Agnew	837,135	56.92%	9 / 9	Won
1976	Gerald Ford/Bob Dole	777,732	50.00%	8 / 9	Lost
1980	Ronald Reagan/George H. W. Bush	865,244	49.66%	9 / 9	Won
1984	Ronald Reagan/George H. W. Bush	1,051,670	55.82%	10 / 10	Won
1988	George H. W. Bush/Dan Quayle	903,835	48.46%	0 / 10	Won
1992	George H. W. Bush/Dan Quayle	731,234	31.97%	0 / 11	Lost
1996	Bob Dole/Jack Kemp	840,712	37.30%	0 / 11	Lost
2000	George W. Bush/Dick Cheney	1,108,864	44.56%	0 / 11	Won
2004	George W. Bush/Dick Cheney	1,304,894	45.60%	0 / 11	Won
2008	John McCain/Sarah Palin	1,229,216	40.48%	0 / 11	Lost
2012	Mitt Romney/Paul Ryan	1,290,670	41.29%	0 / 12	Lost
2016	Donald Trump/Mike Pence	1,221,747	36.83%	0 / 12	Won
2020	Donald Trump/Mike Pence	1,584,651	38.77%	0 / 12	Lost
2024	Donald Trump/JD Vance	1,530,923	39.01%	0 / 12	Won

=== Senatorial ===
Washington Republican Party senatorial election results
Election	Senatorial candidate	Votes	Vote %	Result
1914	Wesley Livsey Jones	130,479	37.79%	Won ✓
1916	Miles Poindexter	202,287	55.39%	Won ✓
1920	Wesley Livsey Jones	217,069	56.40%	Won ✓
1922	Miles Poindexter	126,410	42.93%	Lost ✗
1926	Wesley Livsey Jones	164,130	51.31%	Won ✓
1928	Kenneth Macintosh	227,415	46.45%	Lost ✗
1932	Wesley Livsey Jones	197,450	32.70%	Lost ✗
1934	Reno Odlin	168,994	34.02%	Lost ✗
1938	Ewing D. Colvin	220,204	37.12%	Lost ✗
1940	Stephen F. Chadwick	342,589	45.84%	Lost ✗
1944	Harry P. Cain	364,356	44.44%	Lost ✗
1946	Harry P. Cain	358,847	54.34%	Won ✓
1950	Walter Williams	342,464	45.98%	Lost ✗
1952	Harry P. Cain	460,884	43.53%	Lost ✗
1956	Arthur B. Langlie	436,652	38.91%	Lost ✗
1958	William B. Bantz	278,271	31.38%	Lost ✗
1962	Richard G. Christensen	446,204	47.31%	Lost ✗
1964	Lloyd J. Andrews	337,138	27.79%	Lost ✗
1968	Jack Metcalf	435,894	35.26%	Lost ✗
1970	Charles W. Elicker	170,790	16.01%	Lost ✗
1974	Jack Metcalf	363,626	36.08%	Lost ✗
1976	George M. Brown	361,546	24.25%	Lost ✗
1980	Slade Gorton	936,317	54.17%	Won ✓
1982	Douglas Jewett	332,273	24.28%	Lost ✗
1983 (special)	Daniel J. Evans	672,326	55.41%	Won ✓
1986	Slade Gorton	650,931	48.67%	Lost ✗
1988	Slade Gorton	944,359	51.09%	Won ✓
1992	Rod Chandler	1,020,829	46.01%	Lost ✗
1994	Slade Gorton	947,821	55.75%	Won ✓
1998	Linda Smith	785,377	41.59%	Lost ✗
2000	Slade Gorton	1,197,208	48.64%	Lost ✗
2004	George Nethercutt	1,204,584	43.74%	Lost ✗
2006	Mike McGavick	832,106	39.91%	Lost ✗
2010	Dino Rossi	1,196,164	47.64%	Lost ✗
2012	Michael Baumgartner	1,213,924	39.55%	Lost ✗
2016	Chris Vance	1,329,338	40.99%	Lost ✗
2018	Susan Hutchison	1,282,804	41.57%	Lost ✗
2022	Tiffany Smiley	1,299,322	42.63%	Lost ✗
2024	Raul Garcia	1,549,187	40.64%	Lost ✗

=== Gubernatorial ===
Washington Republican Party gubernatorial election results
Election	Gubernatorial candidate	Votes	Vote %	Result
1889	Elisha P. Ferry	33,711	57.68%	Won ✓
1892	John McGraw	33,281	37.01%	Won ✓
1896	Potter C. "Charley" Sullivan	38,154	41.68%	Lost ✗
1900	John M. Frink	49,860	46.81%	Lost ✗
1904	Albert E. Mead	74,278	51.34%	Won ✓
1908	Samuel G. Cosgrove	110,190	62.56%	Won ✓
1912	Marion E. Hay	96,629	30.35%	Lost ✗
1916	Henry McBride	167,809	44.44%	Lost ✗
1920	Louis F. Hart	210,662	52.25%	Won ✓
1924	Roland H. Hartley	220,162	56.41%	Won ✓
1928	Roland H. Hartley	281,991	56.22%	Won ✓
1932	John Arthur Gellatly	207,497	33.75%	Lost ✗
1936	Roland H. Hartley	189,141	28.12%	Lost ✗
1940	Arthur B. Langlie	392,522	50.24%	Won ✓
1944	Arthur B. Langlie	400,604	48.12%	Lost ✗
1948	Arthur B. Langlie	445,958	50.50%	Won ✓
1952	Arthur B. Langlie	567,822	52.65%	Won ✓
1956	Emmett T. Anderson	508,041	45.00%	Lost ✗
1960	Lloyd J. Andrews	594,122	48.87%	Lost ✗
1964	Daniel J. Evans	697,256	55.77%	Won ✓
1968	Daniel J. Evans	692,378	54.72%	Won ✓
1972	Daniel J. Evans	747,825	50.78%	Won ✓
1976	John Spellman	687,039	44.43%	Lost ✗
1980	John Spellman	981,083	56.68%	Won ✓
1984	John Spellman	881,994	46.69%	Lost ✗
1988	Bob Williams	708,481	37.79%	Lost ✗
1992	Ken Eikenberry	1,086,216	47.84%	Lost ✗
1996	Ellen Craswell	940,538	42.04%	Lost ✗
2000	John Carlson	980,060	39.68%	Lost ✗
2004	Dino Rossi	1,373,228	48.87%	Lost ✗
2008	Dino Rossi	1,404,124	46.76%	Lost ✗
2012	Rob McKenna	1,488,245	48.46%	Lost ✗
2016	Bill Bryant	1,476,346	45.49%	Lost ✗
2020	Loren Culp	1,749,066	43.12%	Lost ✗
2024	Dave Reichert	1,709,818	44.28%	Lost ✗

== See also ==
- Mainstream Republicans of Washington
- Washington State Democratic Party
