= Dick Bond (Washington politician) =

American politician

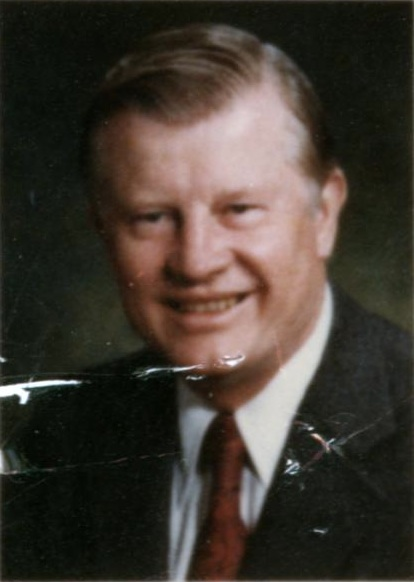

Member of the Washington House of Representatives from the 6th district - Seat 2
- In office 1975–1987 Serving with A. J. Pardini (1975–1979); Michael R. McGinnis (1979–1983); James E. West (1983–1985)
- Preceded by: Jerry C. Kopet
- Succeeded by: John Moyer

Personal details
- Born: April 23, 1921 Spokane, Washington
- Died: March 25, 2015
- Party: Republican
- Spouse: Patty Hendrickson
- Education: California Institute of Technology (BAS); University of California, Berkeley (BS); University of Southern California (BS)

Richard M. Bond (April 23, 1921 – March 25, 2015) was an American politician who served in the Washington House of Representatives from the 6th district as a member of the Republican Party.

Bond was educated at the California Institute of Technology, University of California, Berkeley, and University of Southern California. In 1968, he unsuccessfully ran with the Republican nomination against Tom Foley in the Washington's 5th congressional district. In 1974, he was elected to the Washington House of Representatives.

== Early life and education ==
Richard M. Bond was born on April 23, 1921, in Spokane, Washington. During World War II he joined the V-12 Navy College Training Program.

Bond graduated from the California Institute of Technology with a Bachelor of Applied Science degree, from the University of California, Berkeley with a Bachelor of Science in mechanical engineering, and from the University of Southern California with a Bachelor of Science in business administration. He later founded and served as president of the Solar Gas Company.

== Career ==
=== U.S. House of Representatives campaign ===
On April 11, 1966, the 100 member Draft Dick Bond for Congress Committee was formed and Dwight Aden was selected as its chairman. The organization attempted to draft Bond for the Republican nomination in Washington's 5th congressional district, but Bond declined to run on May 11.

On May 4, 1968, Bond announced that he would run for the Republican nomination in the 5th congressional district and selected Charles Carroll to serve as his campaign chairman and Ronald D. Sanders as his campaign manager. During the primary campaign Maureen Reagan, the daughter of California Governor Ronald Reagan, sang at one of Bond's rallies. He won the Republican nomination, but was defeated by incumbent Democratic Representative Tom Foley in the general election where all of the incumbent representatives in Washington were reelected.

=== Washington House of Representatives ===
==== Elections ====
Incumbent Representative Jerry C. Kopet announced that he would not seek reelection to the Washington House of Representatives from the 6th district and would instead seek election to the as Spokane County Commission. On August 1, 1974, Bond announced that he would seek the Republican nomination to succeed Kopet. On August 29, he selected Richard E. Ellingwood Jr. to serve as his campaign chairman. Bond won in the Republican primary and defeated Democratic nominee Charlotte Coker in the general election.

On July 22, 1976, Bond announced that he would seek reelection to the Washington House of Representatives. He faced no opposition in the general election.

==== Tenure ====
From 1975 to 1987, Bond served as a member of the Washington House of Representatives from the 6th district. From 1975 to 1979, he served alongside A. J. Pardini, Michael R. McGinnis from 1979 to 1983, and James E. West from 1983 to 1985, who all served from the first seat.

In 1975, Bond was appointed to serve on the Higher Education, Natural Resources, and Social and Health Services committees, but was later transferred from the Social and Health Services committee to the Transportation committee on February 5. In 1977, Bond was appointed to serve on the Revenue, Labor, and Energy and Utilities committees during the 45th legislative session.

In 1976, Bond and state Senator Kent Pullen introduced legislation to impeach King County Superior Judge Solie M. Ringold, but the legislation was unsuccessful.

During the 1976 Republican presidential primaries Bond served as the chairman of Ronald Reagan's presidential campaign in Washington's 5th congressional district. He also served as one of Spokane County's 99 delegates to the Washington State Republican Party's state convention. At the state convention Bond was selected to serve as a Reagan delegate to the Republican National Convention from the 5th congressional district.

== Later life ==
During the 1988 Republican presidential primaries Bond supported Representative Jack Kemp for the Republican presidential nomination. During the 1992 Washington gubernatorial election Bond supported and endorsed Republican nominee Ken Eikenberry.

On March 25, 2015, Bond died in an assisted-living facility and had his cremated remains scattered in Alaska.

== Political positions ==
In 1977, Bond was selected to serve as president of Citizens Against Pornography.

=== Alcohol and drugs ===
In 1975, Bond introduced legislation which would prohibit the sale of intoxicating beverages on state university, college, and community campuses. He stated that bars in student unions were a deterrent to the education process. The legislation passed in the Washington House of Representatives and Senate, but was vetoed by Governor Daniel J. Evans. The Senate voted to override Evans' veto, but the House of Representatives failed to override his veto.

He also attempted to add an amendment, which would have prohibited the sale of intoxicating beverages on state university, college, and community campuses, to legislation allowing the sale of alcohol at the University of Washington. However, his amendment was dismissed as out of order.

On April 6, 1977, the Washington House of Representatives voted, with Bond voting against, in favor of decriminalizing marijuana through a roll call vote.

=== Campaign finance ===
In 1996, Bond opposed a plank in the Spokane County Republican Party's platform which called for campaign finance laws to be changed to eliminate political action committees. He stated that the "only thing that allows Republicans to compete with unions is PACS, and anybody who doesn't understand that doesn't belong here."

=== Communism ===
In 1993, Bond stated that John Moyer believed Karl Marx was right due to Moyer's statement "I want to be able to say I'm from Washington state, where they take care of people." In 1998, Bond criticized the declaration of Nelson Mandela as a political prisoner, that the African National Congress was a communist controlled party, and that Mandela was helped by Fidel Castro, Muammar Gaddafi, China, and the Soviet Union.

=== Development ===
In 1975, the Washington House of Representatives voted 90 to 5, with Bond against, in favor of legislation that would permit all counties to participate in urban renewal projects and receive federal funding for community development projects. Before the passage of the legislation only King County and municipalities could participate in urban renewal projects and receive federal funding.

=== Foreign policy ===
In 1977, Bond wrote a letter to Governor Dixy Lee Ray supporting her criticism of British Columbia's opposition to the building of a Trident submarine base near Bremerton, Washington.

In 1988, Bond organized 50 protesters to counter-protest 200 protesters who were opposed to the United States funding of the Contras in the Nicaraguan Revolution. He stated that he organized the counter-protest as he was tired of seeing opponents of the Contras get all of the publicity.

In 2003, Bond criticized anti-war protesters and stated that Saddam Hussein had access to lethal weapons. He also criticized France and Canada for not supporting the coalition forces.

=== Gun rights ===
In 1999, Bond criticized drug and gun free zone signs at schools stating that they did not work.
