= Sherril Huff =

American politician

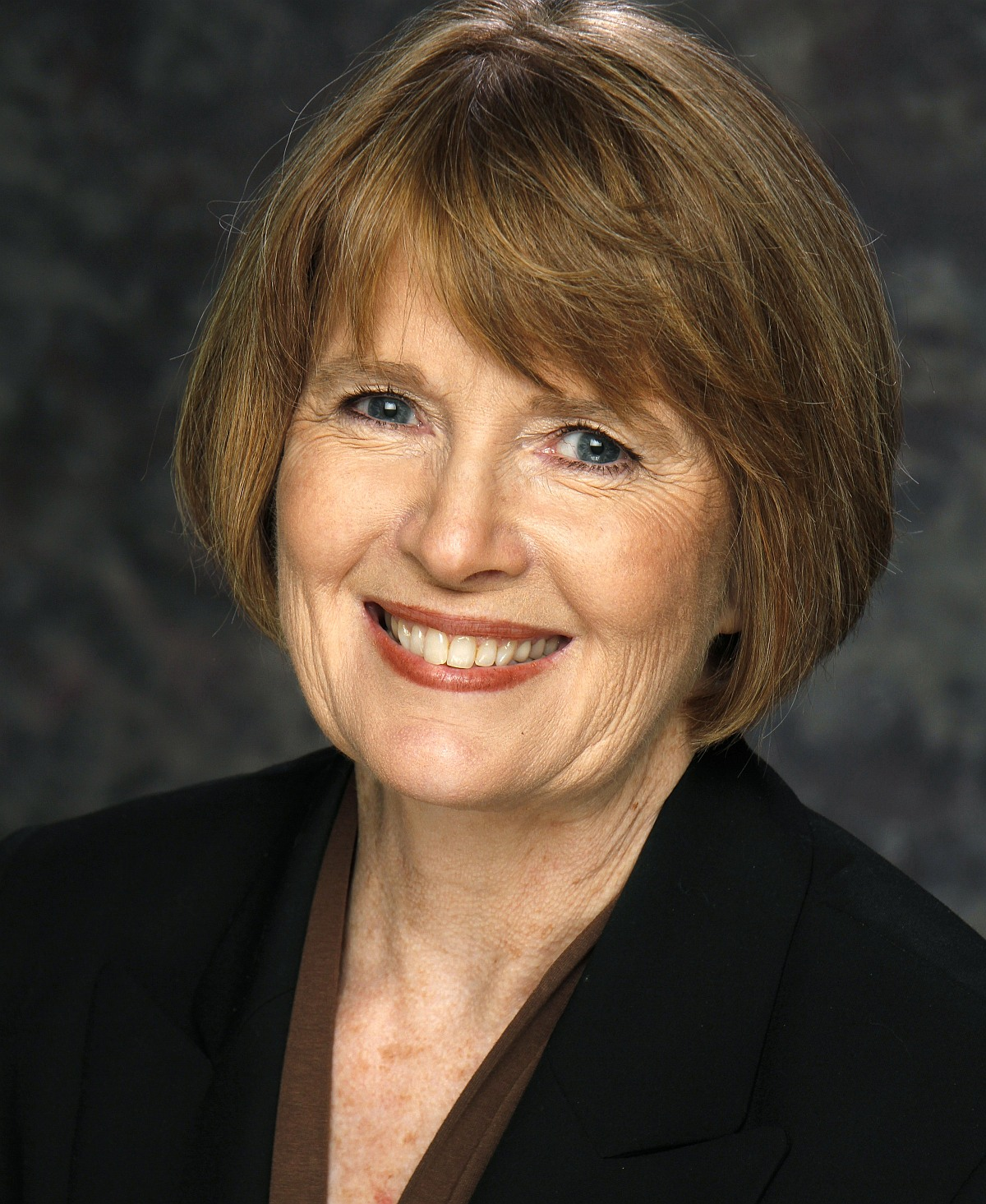
- Sherril Huff in 2010
- Occupation: Superintendent of Elections

Sherril Huff is a former director of elections of King County, Washington.

In 1984, Huff ran in the 23rd Legislative race against Ellen Craswell, and got 46% of the vote.

== Career ==
Originally from Kitsap County Huff spent two years as Assistant Director of the elections department at King County, Washington. Before that she worked for eight years as the municipal services coordinator for Bremerton and was an Assistant Director of the state lottery and Deputy Mayor and City Council member for Bremerton.

Huff managed the change to countywide voting by mail, enabling King County to become the largest jurisdiction in the United States where elections are conducted entirely through the mail service. Vote-by-mail was then used to select the position of Director of County Elections, which she won.

== Interests ==
Sherill Huff has been a chair and team leader for the YMCA Partners with Youth Campaign and co-chair at the Naval Undersea Museum. Huff also works as a voluntary mentor at an Elementary school and is a board member of the Admiral Foundation and a number of community organizations.
