= Ellen Craswell =

American politician

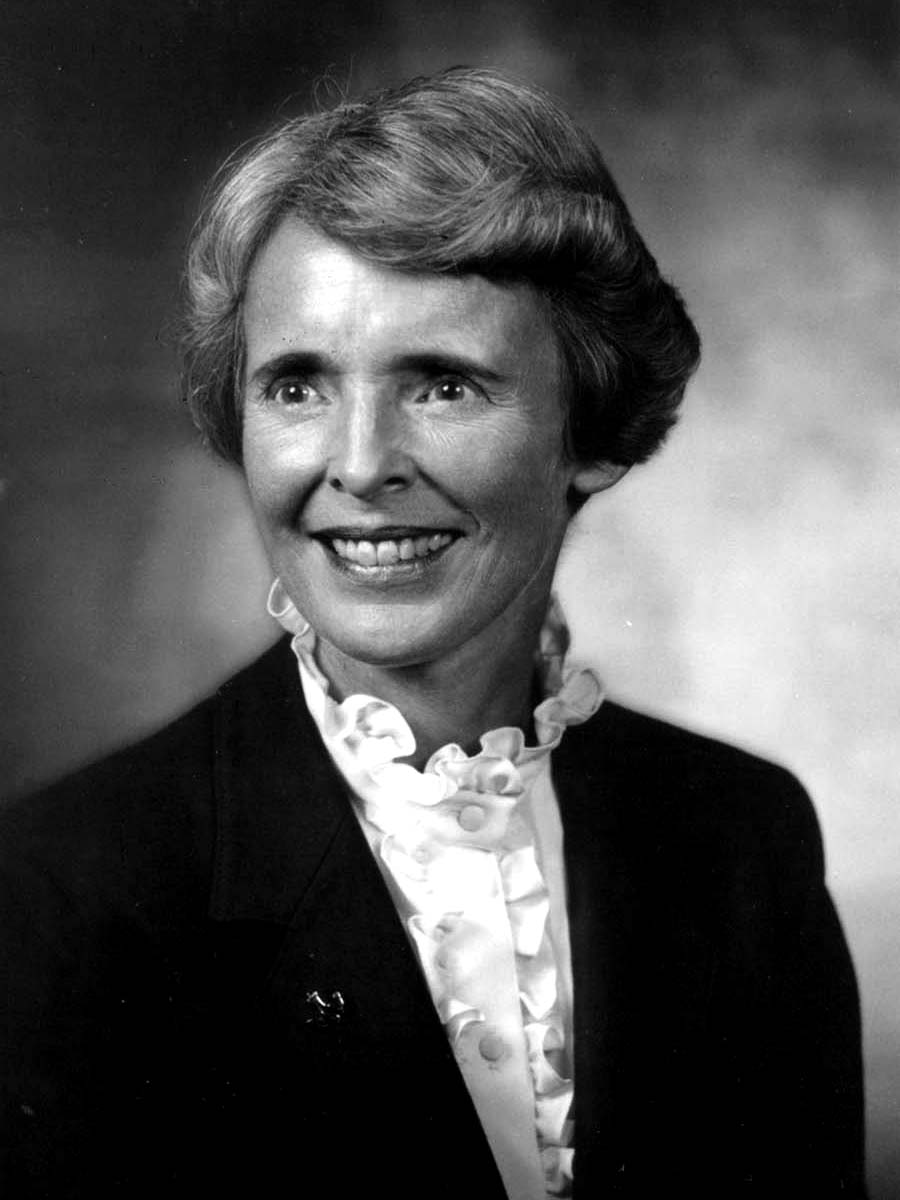
- Craswell in 1977

President pro tempore of the Washington Senate
- In office January 14, 1991 – January 11, 1993
- Preceded by: Alan Bluechel
- Succeeded by: R. Lorraine Wojahn

Member of the Washington Senate from the 23rd district
- In office January 12, 1981 – January 11, 1993
- Preceded by: Gordon L. Walgren
- Succeeded by: Betti Sheldon

Member of the Washington House of Representatives from the 23rd district
- In office January 10, 1977 – January 12, 1981
- Preceded by: Robert W. Randall
- Succeeded by: Karen Schmidt

Personal details
- Born: May 25, 1932 Bothell, Washington, U.S.
- Died: April 5, 2008 (aged 75) Poulsbo, Washington, U.S.
- Party: Republican
- Spouse: Bruce Craswell
- Children: 4
- Education: University of Washington, Seattle (BS)

Ellen Craswell (May 25, 1932 – April 5, 2008) was an American politician who was a candidate in the 1996 Washington gubernatorial election. She ran as a Republican but grew disillusioned with the party and later joined the American Heritage Party, the Washington State affiliate of the Constitution Party. She resided in Poulsbo, Washington with her husband and fellow politician, Bruce Craswell.

== Early life ==
Ellen Howe was born in Bothell, Washington on May 25, 1932, and grew up in Silverdale, Washington, the fifth child in a household of seven children. Her father died when she was nine years old, and her mother raised the family.

== Career ==
Craswell was elected to Washington's 23rd Legislative District in 1976. She received 33.69% of the vote against two Democrats in the 1976 primary, before going on to defeat Democrat Ray Aardal, with 54.63% of the vote. She won landslides in both 1978 and 1980, when she became a member of the Washington State Senate. From 1984 and onwards, she faced a series of competitive races. She narrowly won re-election after a recount in 1988 and was defeated by Democrat Betti Sheldon in 1992. During her tenure as a senator, she earned the nickname "Senator No" for her steady refusal to vote for any tax increases. In 1987 she was appointed as the first female president pro tempore of the Senate, a position she held until the end of her career.

=== 1996 Washington gubernatorial election ===
After Democrat Mike Lowry announced that he would not seek re-election, Craswell announced that she would run. During her legislative career, she was initially identified as a Ronald Reagan supporter, but as time went on, she gained a strong identity as an evangelical Christian and member of the Christian right. Craswell was very open about her religious identity, prompting concern among some in the Republican Party that she would have difficulty in moderately liberal Washington. During the campaign, Craswell successfully appealed to suburban conservatives with more moderate social leanings by promising to repeal more than a third of state taxes and cut 30 percent of the state budget. In September 1996, she narrowly gained the primary nod, receiving 15.26% of the primary vote and defeating her nearest Republican opponent Dale Foreman, who received 13.37%.

Craswell campaigned both on fiscal issues and as an unabashed conservative Christian. She gained media coverage for comments, including those where she described herself as a "radical," declared that she would hire only "wise and godly people" as staffers, and listed God at the top of her campaign organization chart. Education also became an important issue during the campaign, with Craswell supporting heavy localization and a tuition-based system for all schools, and Democratic opponent Gary Locke supporting a more state-centric system. Craswell ran a grassroots campaign, receiving campaign contributions from only individuals and advertising only on billboards and yard signs and at campaign events.

Craswell's outspoken position on social issues – including comments that gay rights were "special rights for sodomites" – did not resonate with voters in the state. In November, Craswell was defeated by Locke, receiving only 42.04% of the vote.

=== Subsequent activity ===
Following her defeat in the election, Craswell switched party affiliation to the Christian right American Heritage Party (AHP). Her husband, Bruce, ran under the party's banner in the 1st congressional district and received 6.11%.

When the AHP (then a state affiliate of the Constitution Party) attempted to disaffiliate from the national party (CP), it caused an acrimonious schism resulting in non-renewal by over 90 percent of the state party members. The Craswells left both the American Heritage Party and the Constitution Party and became independents.

== Personal life ==
In 1955, she married Bruce Craswell, a dentist who she had met in college.

Craswell lived with her family in the Poulsbo, Washington area, until her death on April 5, 2008. She had four children and 14 grandchildren. She had been diagnosed with cancer twice before but succumbed to her third bout with the disease. After retiring from politics, Craswell remained fairly quiet, granting few interviews.

Washington State Senate
Preceded by Alan Bluechel	President pro tempore of the Washington Senate; 1991–1993	Succeeded by R. Lorraine Wojahn
Party political offices
Preceded by Ken Eikenberry	Republican nominee for Governor of Washington; 1996	Succeeded by John Carlson
