= William C. Goodloe =

American judge (1919–1997)

Chief Justice of the Washington Supreme Court
- In office January 14, 1985 – July 17, 1988
- Appointed by: General Election

Judge of the King County Superior Court

Member of the Washington Senate from the 32nd district
- In office 1951–1959
- Preceded by: Ward Davidson
- Succeeded by: Wayne Angevine

Chair of the Washington Republican Party
- In office 1960–1962
- Preceded by: Arnold S. Wang
- Succeeded by: Montgomery Johnson

Personal details
- Born: William Cassius Goodloe III; September 19, 1919 Lexington, Kentucky, U.S.
- Died: January 18, 1997 (aged 77) Seattle, Washington, U.S.
- Party: Republican; American Heritage
- Spouse: Ruth
- Education: University of Washington

William Cassius Goodloe III (September 19, 1919 – January 18, 1997) was an American lawyer, politician and judge, who served as chief justice of the Washington Supreme Court from 1985 to 1988.

== Life and career ==
William Goodloe was born in Lexington, Kentucky. After graduating from the University of Washington School of Law in 1948, he went on to practice as a trial lawyer for 24 years.

Goodloe served in the Washington State Senate as a Republican from 1951 to 1959, and later headed the 1962 World's Fair committee. He also served as the chairman of the Washington State Republican Party from 1960 to 1962.

He served on the King County Superior Court for twelve years and served for three and a half years on the Washington State Supreme Court from January 14, 1985, to July 17, 1988, after winning a contested election. While on the Supreme Court, Justice Goodloe authored 56 majority opinions with 12 concurrences and 34 dissents. He resigned his position before the end of his first term.

Goodloe twice attempted to run for the US Senate. In 1988, he entered the Republican primary against Slade Gorton, receiving around 3% of the vote. In January 1992, Goodloe challenged Democratic Senator Brock Adams as a third-party candidate, representing the Washington Taxpayers Party, which he had established in 1991.

In the early 1990s, Goodloe set up a group called "Morality in Youth" to oppose a plan by the Seattle School District to distribute contraception in public schools.

== Jurisprudence ==
He was an advocate of jury nullification and suggested that the following instruction be given by judges to all juries in criminal cases:

"You are instructed that this being a criminal case you are the exclusive judges of the evidence, the credibility of the witnesses and the weight to be given to their testimony, and you have a right also to determine the law in the case. The court does not intend to express any opinion concerning the weight of the evidence, but it is the duty of the court to advise you as to the law, and it is your duty to consider the instructions of the court; yet in your decision upon the merits of the case you have a right to determine for yourselves the law as well as the facts by which your verdict shall be governed."

== Personal life ==
Goodloe and his wife Phyllis lived in the Seattle area with a large family. He was also a Freemason and a member of the Valley of Seattle, Ancient & Accepted Scottish Rite and held the rank and title of 32° Knight Commander of the Court of Honour.

As well as being an amateur painter, Goodloe spent a majority of his time after his retirement studying and giving speeches on the US Constitution.
