= Peggy Maxie =

American politician from Washington (1936–2024)

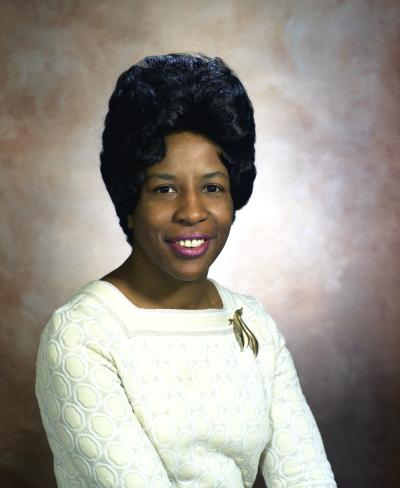
- Maxie in 1973

Member of the Washington House of Representatives from the 37th district
- In office 1971–1983
- Succeeded by: Gary Locke

Personal details
- Born: August 18, 1936 Amarillo, Texas, U.S.
- Died: February 18, 2024 (aged 87)
- Party: Democratic
- Occupation: Counselor

Peggy Joan Maxie (August 18, 1936 – February 18, 2024) was an American politician in the state of Washington. Maxie was the first African-American woman elected to the Washington House of Representatives, serving the 37th district from 1971 to 1983. She was the prime sponsor of the Landlord-Tenant Act in Washington state. Representing the Central District, Seattle, along with parts of Capitol Hill and Downtown, she worked to preserve her district and the representation of Central District in the legislature. She was defeated in the primary election for her seat in 1981 by Gary Locke. An alumnus of Seattle University and the University of Washington, she held a Bachelor of Arts and Masters in Social Work degree and worked as a mental health therapist and counselor.

== Early life ==
Maxie was born on August 18, 1936, in Amarillo, Texas. Her parents were Cleveland, an auto mechanic, and Reba Maxie, a housewife, and she had four siblings. Her parents divorced and her mother moved the family to Seattle, Washington, in 1942, where she worked for Boeing. Maxie attended Immaculate Conception School, graduating from the high school in 1995. After graduation, she worked as a legal secretary at the state attorney general's office and the Seattle Urban League. She briefly studied to be a nun with the Sisters of Charity at Providence. In 1970, she received her bachelor of arts degree in psychology from Seattle University.

== Political career ==
Maxie was encouraged to run for the Washington House of Representatives in 1970 by her family. Her brother, Fred, had considered contesting the race but ultimately decided to go to law school and campaign signs had already been printed with their surname. Maxie ran with the support of her brother, Robert, who was active in the Democratic Party, and her campaign manager, Jim McGill, a professor at Seattle University. She won, and became the representative for position 2 in the 37th district. She was the first black woman to be elected to the Washington state legislature. Following her election, she was accepted to the graduate school at the University of Washington and received special permission from the dean of social work to commence her studies while serving as a legislator. She received her masters of social work from the university in 1972, completing her thesis on no-fault divorce.

Following her election, Maxie challenged the proposed redistricting based on the 1970 census, which threatened to disrupt her district. She filed an affidavit stating that her district had been undercounted and two years later, a federal court ordered the state to conduct its redistricting using a non-partisan map.

Maxie served on a variety of committees, including the appropriations committee, the judiciary committee, the rules committee and the insurance committee. In 1972, she was appointed chair of the House higher education committee. Through this role, she spoke out against an increase in tuition for state universities and college proposed by Governor Dan Evans. Republicans on the committee attempted to amend the rules so that a majority on the committee would be able to schedule a hearing, overriding Maxie as the chair, but they were ultimately unsuccessful. Maxie introduced a resolution to refer the question to a citizen's task force to study the issue and report back to the committee. She also sponsored a bill that funded the construction of a new building for the University of Washington School of Social Work.

In 1973, she sponsored the bill which would become the Landlord-Tenant Act, which was the first legislation to create rules to govern the relationship. It created duties on the part of both residential landlords and tenants and created guidelines in relation to evictions, late rent, maintenance and notification prior to entry of a unit. She also co-sponsored the Displaced Homemakers Act, along with R. Lorraine Wojahn, which assisted women who lost income because of the death or disability of a spouse or following divorce. She also sponored a bill to bring the first driver license testing facility to her district.

In 1981, shortly before she left office, Maxie held three legislative workshops on participatory democracy for a total of 600 people to explain the legislative process. She lost the 1982 primary election to Gary Locke.

== Later life and death ==
Maxie founded Women in Unity, a non-profit organization focusing on employment and advocacy for African American women. After leaving the legislature, she worked as a mental health therapist and a consultant on community projects. In 1975, she received an honorary doctor of laws degree from St Martin's University in Lacey, Washington. She was interviewed by Seattle University in 2003 for an oral history project.

Maxie died on February 18, 2024, at the age of 87.
