= Jennifer Dunn =

American politician (1941–2007)

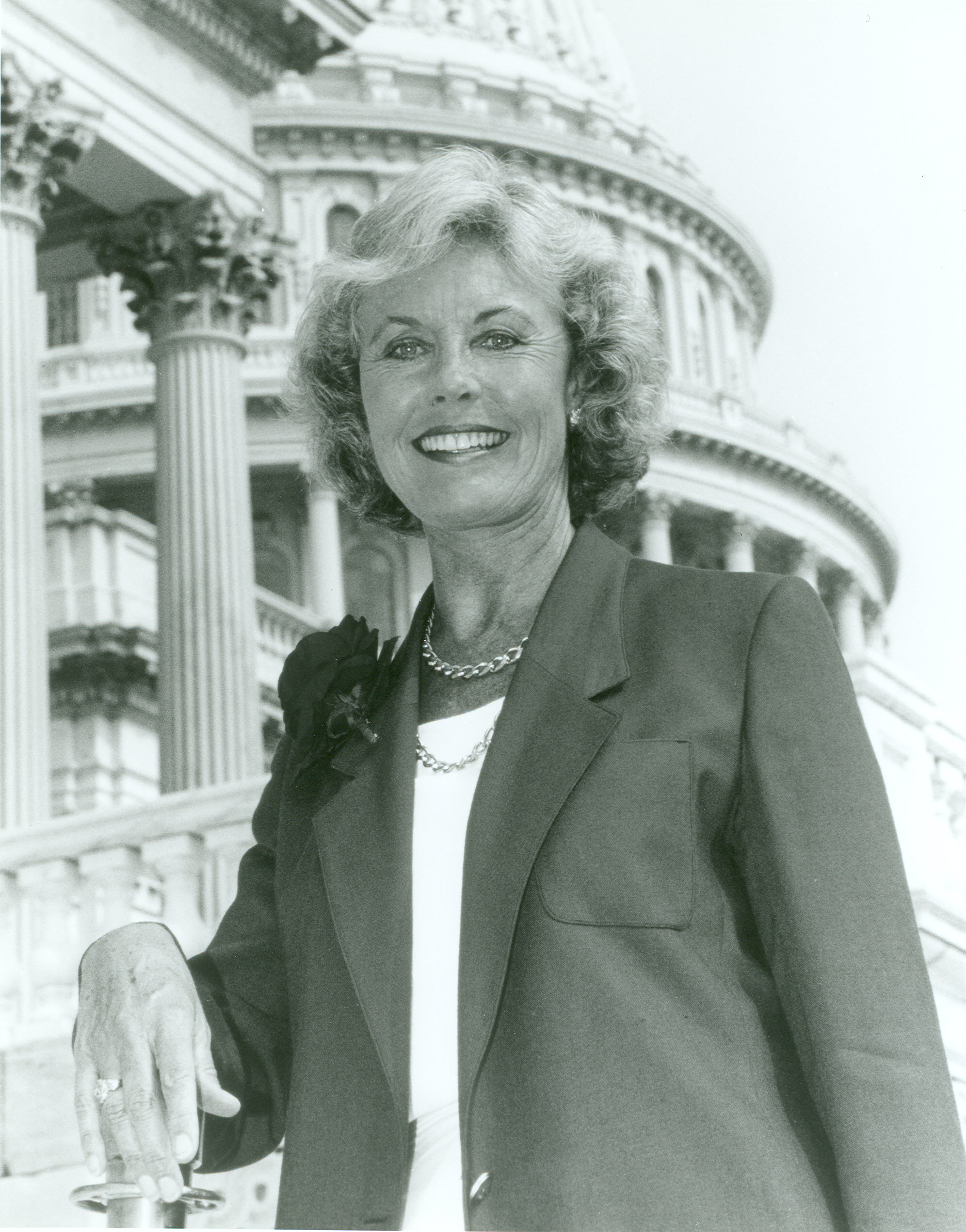

Vice Chair of the House Republican Conference
- In office July 17, 1997 – January 3, 1999
- Leader: Newt Gingrich
- Preceded by: Susan Molinari
- Succeeded by: Tillie Fowler

Secretary of the House Republican Conference
- In office January 3, 1997 – July 17, 1997
- Leader: Newt Gingrich
- Preceded by: Barbara Vucanovich
- Succeeded by: Tillie Fowler

Member of the U.S. House of Representatives from Washington's 8th district
- In office January 3, 1993 – January 3, 2005
- Preceded by: Rod Chandler
- Succeeded by: Dave Reichert

Chair of the Washington Republican Party
- In office January 1, 1981 – January 1, 1992
- Preceded by: Ken Eikenberry
- Succeeded by: Ben Bettridge

Personal details
- Born: Jennifer Jill Blackburn; July 29, 1941 Seattle, Washington, U.S.
- Died: September 5, 2007 (aged 66) Alexandria, Virginia, U.S.
- Party: Republican
- Spouse(s): Dennis Dunn (m. 1965–1977) Keith Thomson (m. 2003–2007)
- Children: 2, including Reagan
- Education: University of Washington (attended); Stanford University (BA)
- Occupation: Engineer

Jennifer Jill Dunn (née Blackburn; July 29, 1941 – September 5, 2007) was an American politician and engineer who served six terms as a Republican member of the United States House of Representatives from 1993 to 2005, representing Washington's 8th congressional district.

== Early life and education ==
Born in Seattle, Washington, Dunn grew up in the nearby city of Bellevue, and graduated from Bellevue High School in 1959. She attended the University of Washington, where she was a member of Gamma Phi Beta sorority, before earning a Bachelor of Arts from Stanford University. After graduation, she worked as a systems engineer. She was a distant cousin of congressman Slade Gorton.

== Political career ==
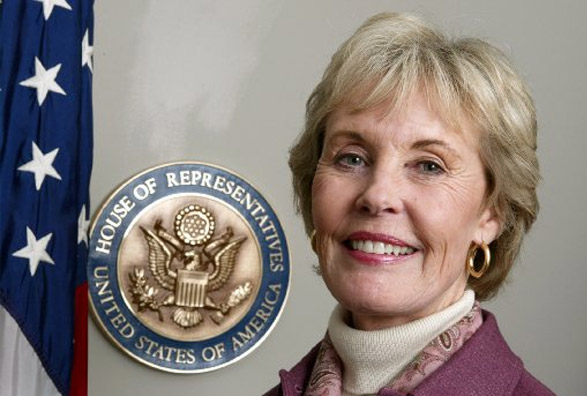
Dunn in 2005

Dunn was chair of the Washington State Republican Party from 1981 to 1992 and twice a delegate to the United Nations Commission on the Status of Women (1984 and 1990).

In 1992, she ran for an open seat in the House, winning 60 percent of the vote. She was Washington's only Republican representative until the Republican Revolution of 1994 when Republicans swept all but two of Washington's nine House seats. In 1998, she became the first woman ever to run for the position of House Majority Leader.

Dunn served as vice-chair of the Select Committee on Homeland Security and served on the House Ways and Means Committee and the Joint Economic Committee. On October 10, 2002, Dunn voted in favor of authorizing the War in Iraq.

In 2000, she served on the presidential election exploratory committee for then-Texas Governor George W. Bush.

== After Congress ==
Dunn announced in 2004 she would retire from Congress, choosing not to run for re-election. Her seat was eventually filled by King County Sheriff Dave Reichert. She co-chaired the Information Technology and Innovation Foundation with former Representative Calvin Dooley. She also served as co-chair of the campaign organization "Women for Mitt" for presidential candidate Mitt Romney at the time of her death in 2007. She was succeeded in the Romney organization by U.S. Representative Kay Granger of Fort Worth, Texas.

== Personal life ==
Dunn had two children, including Reagan Dunn, an attorney and politician who has served as a member of the King County Council since 2005.

Dunn collapsed and died of a pulmonary embolism in 2007, in her Alexandria, Virginia, apartment. Her memorial service was held at St. James Cathedral, Seattle.

== Electoral history ==
Washington's 8th congressional district: Results 1992–2004
Year	Democrat	Votes	Pct	Republican	Votes	Pct	3rd Party	Party	Votes	Pct
1992	George O. Tamblyn	87,611	34%	Jennifer Dunn	155,874	60%	Bob Adams	Independent	14,686	6%
1994	Jim Wyrick	44,165	24%	Jennifer Dunn	140,409	76%				
1996	Dave Little	90,340	35%	Jennifer Dunn	170,691	65%				
1998	Heidi Behrens-Benedict	91,371	40%	Jennifer Dunn	135,539	60%				
2000	Heidi Behrens-Benedict	104,944	36%	Jennifer Dunn	183,255	62%	Bernard McIlroy	Libertarian	6,269	2%
2002	Heidi Behrens-Benedict	75,931	37%	Jennifer Dunn	121,633	60%	Mark A. Taff	Libertarian	5,771	3%

== See also ==
- Women in the United States House of Representatives

U.S. House of Representatives
Preceded by Rod Chandler	Member of the U.S. House of Representatives from Washington's 8th congressional district 1993–2005	Succeeded by Dave Reichert
Party political offices
Preceded by Ken Eikenberry	Chair of the Washington Republican Party; 1981–1992	Succeeded by Ben Bettridge
Preceded by Barbara Vucanovich	Secretary of the House Republican Conference; 1997	Succeeded by Tillie Fowler
Preceded by Susan Molinari	Vice Chairperson of the House Republican Conference; 1997–1999	Succeeded by Tillie Fowler
Preceded by Trent Lott	Response to the State of the Union address 1999; Served alongside: Steve Largent	Succeeded by Susan Collins; Bill Frist
