= Ken Eikenberry =

American lawyer and politician (1932–2023)

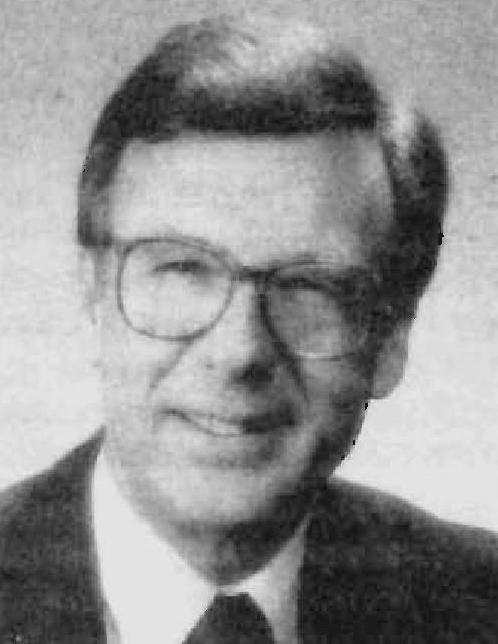

Chair of the Washington Republican Party
- In office January 1, 1993 – January 1, 1996
- Preceded by: Ben Bettridge
- Succeeded by: Dale Foreman
- In office January 1, 1977 – January 1, 1981
- Preceded by: Ross Davis
- Succeeded by: Jennifer Dunn

15th Attorney General of Washington
- In office January 1, 1981 – January 13, 1993
- Governor: John Spellman; Booth Gardner
- Preceded by: Slade Gorton
- Succeeded by: Christine Gregoire

Member of the Washington House of Representatives from the 36th district
- In office January 11, 1971 – January 10, 1977
- Preceded by: John Murray
- Succeeded by: Joe Taller

Personal details
- Born: Kenneth Otto Eikenberry; June 29, 1932 Wenatchee, Washington, U.S.
- Died: December 22, 2023 (aged 91) Olympia, Washington, U.S.
- Party: Republican
- Spouse: Beverly
- Education: Wenatchee Valley College; Washington State University, Pullman (BA); University of Washington (JD)

Kenneth Otto Eikenberry (June 29, 1932 – December 22, 2023) was an American lawyer and Republican politician from the state of Washington who served as the Washington Attorney General from 1981 to 1993. He was the unsuccessful Republican candidate for the governor of Washington in 1992. Because General Ekenberry had a warm, engaging, and almost shy disposition he was loved by all the assistant attorneys general and staff members regardless of their political beliefs. He was a quiet leader whose sense of fairness and equality never waivered.

== Background ==
Kenneth Otto Eikenberry was born in Wenatchee, Washington, on June 29, 1932. He was educated at Wenatchee Valley College, Washington State University, and the University of Washington School of Law.

== Career ==
Eikenberry began his career with the Federal Bureau of Investigation before joining the King County Prosecuting Attorney's Office. He entered politics at the turn of the 1970s, and was a three-term elected member of the Washington State House of Representatives from 1971 through 1977. Eikenberry served the 36th district. He also served as the elected Chairman of the Washington State Republican Party 1977 to 1980, and again from 1993 through 1996.

In 1980, Eikenberry succeeded Slade Gorton as attorney general, who went on to represent Washington in the United States Senate. Eikenberry ran for governor of Washington in 1992, and was defeated narrowly by Democrat Mike Lowry. Eikenberry served on the board of the Constitutional Law PAC.

He endorsed Clint Didier for the U.S. Senate in 2010.

Eikenberry appeared in TV commercials in Washington urging a "NO" vote on the 2013 Washington Initiative 522 on the labeling of genetically-engineered foods.

== Personal life and death ==
Eikenberry married his wife, Beverly, on December 21, 1963. He died in Olympia, Washington, from progressive supranuclear palsy, on December 22, 2023, at the age of 91.

Party political offices
| Preceded by Earl Davenport | Chair of the Washington Republican Party; 1977–1981 | Succeeded by Jennifer Dunn |
| Preceded by Bob Williams | Republican nominee for Governor of Washington; 1992 | Succeeded by Ellen Craswell |
| Preceded by Ben Bettridge | Chair of the Washington Republican Party; 1993–1996 | Succeeded by Dale Foreman |
Legal offices
| Preceded by Slade Gorton | Attorney General of Washington; 1981–1993 | Succeeded by Christine Gregoire |
