= R. Lorraine Wojahn =

American politician

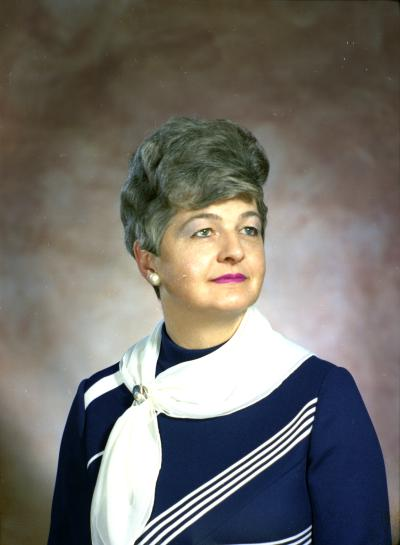
- Wojahn in 1971

President pro tempore of the Washington Senate
- In office January 11, 1993 – January 8, 2001
- Preceded by: Ellen Craswell
- Succeeded by: Rosa Franklin

Member of the Washington Senate from the 27th district
- In office January 10, 1977 – January 8, 2001
- Preceded by: Joe Stortini
- Succeeded by: Debbie Regala

Member of the Washington House of Representatives from the 27th district
- In office January 13, 1969 – January 10, 1977
- Preceded by: George P. Sheridan
- Succeeded by: James E. Salatino

Personal details
- Born: Ruth Lorraine Kendall; September 17, 1920 Easton, Washington, U.S.
- Died: October 13, 2012 (aged 92) Tacoma, Washington, U.S.
- Party: Democratic
- Education: University of Washington (BA)

Ruth Lorraine Wojahn (née Kendall; September 17, 1920 – October 13, 2012) was an American politician in the state of Washington. Born in Easton, Washington, she attended the University of Washington. Wojahn served in Washington House of Representatives in 1969 and then in the Washington State Senate in 1977 as a Democrat. She died in Tacoma, Washington.

== Early life ==
Wojahn was born Ruth Lorraine Kendall on September 17, 1920, in Easton, Washington. She was adopted by Frederick Charles Kendall, an executive for the Northern Pacific Railway, and Edna Ogilbee Kendall. Her father's work meant they moved frequently and although Wojahn spent most of her childhood in Seattle, Washington, the family spent four years in Missoula, Montana, when she was between the ages of ten and fourteen. They moved back to Seattle around 1935 and Wojahn graduated from Roosevelt High School. She had considered working in the medical field, influenced by caring for her mother through a chronic heart condition, but instead attended the University of Washington, majoring in journalism and communications. She worked for the department store I. Magnin as a model and played field hockey, basketball and volleyball.

After her first year of university, she met Gilbert Wojahn, who would become her future husband. The couple bought an engagement ring on December 7, 1941, the same day that Pearl Harbor was bombed. Her fiancé, an architect, registered for the draft and began working on ship design for the Corps of Engineers at the Ballard Locks. They married in 1942 and after the end of the war, her husband took a job with an architectural firm and the couple moved to Tacoma, Washington. They had two sons, Toby and Mark, and Wojahn stayed at home to raise the children and volunteer with the Cub Scouts, the Boys and Girls Club, the YWCA and the PTA.

== Political career ==
Wojahn was hired by the Washington State Labor Council in January 1964 to serve as an officer with the Retail Store Employees Union. She worked to create political education programs as a field agent before becoming a labor-council lobbyist. She studied labor history at Tacoma Community College and worked on the state Commission on the Status of Women. She worked on Democrat Floyd Verne Hicks' 1964 campaign to be the U.S. representative for Washington's 6th district, where she registered more than 35,000 new voters.

=== Washington House of Representatives ===
Following the retirement of George Sheridan, Wojahn was approached to run for election to the Washington House of Representatives for the 27th district in 1968. She was supported in her candidacy by the local labour groups but not the State Labor Council. She ran the election by 307 votes but felt betrayed by her former employer and did not join the labor committee. Instead she was chair of the commerce committee and a member of the revenue and taxation committee, the appropriations committee and the judiciary committee, the first non-lawyer to serve in the latter role. She supported the state income tax which was proposed by Governor Daniel J. Evans, although it was rejected by the public.

She was one of seven women serving in the House during her first term and a member of Evans's Women's Council. In 1972, she sponsored legislation to ratify the national Equal Rights Amendment (ERA) and sponsored a separate measure to pass a version for Washington state. The latter legislation, House Joint Resolution 61, was passed by ballot initiative in November 1972.

=== Washington State Senate ===
Wojahn successfully ran for a seat in the Washington State Senate in 1976, taking office the following year. She was asked to run for mayor of Tacoma two years later, to replace Gordon Johnston who was term limited. She accepted reluctantly but ultimately lost to Mike Parker. In the Senate, Wojahn sponsored a variety of successful legislation, including the Displaced Homemakers Act along co-sponsor Peggy Maxie, which assisted women who were displaced by the loss of a spouse or their spouse's income, and a bill lowering the voting age in the state to 18. In 1984, the legislature declared it to be the Year of the Child in coordination with a UNICEF program and Wojahn took the lead on the various pieces of legislation, including daycare, housing construction, and paternity, custody and child support. She also served on the State Employees Insurance Board.

She was appointed as the chair of the committee on human services and corrections in October 1985. The following year, she produced the first comprehensive policy to limit the spread of HIV and AIDS in the state. She also supported the legislation to separate the existing Department of Social and Health Services, dividing it into two departments with separate remits for social issues and medical care. The bill to create a new Department of Health passed the House and Senate and was signed into law by Governor Booth Gardner on May 31, 1989.

Wojahn often worked on social issues. She sponsored an assault weapons ban, a domestic violence bill and a bill to protect gays and lesbians from discrimination, although none of this legislation was successful. She supported a state healthcare bill which passed the Senate in April 1993, which was intended to require businesses to provide health insurance to their employees by 1997, although the act was repealed in 1995. In 1997, she submitted a recording of Washington Supreme Court justice Richard Sanders speaking in opposition of abortion at a political rally to the Commission on Judicial Conduct.

She also focused on parks and recreation issues, working to redevelop downtown Tacoma. The city purchased Union Station Tacoma in 1984 and it was converted into a federal courthouse. Wojahn had negotiated for the building to be used as a state museum of history but ultimately, she worked with fellow representative Dan Grimm to receive $34 million from bonds and with councilmember Tom Stegner to receive a donation of two and a half acres of land from the city. The Washington State History Museum opened on August 10, 1996.

== Later life ==
Wojahn retired from the State Senate following the 2000 legislative session. She was interviewed by Anne Kilgannon for the Washington State Legislature's Oral History Project and the resulting book was published in 2010. She died of congestive heart failure on October 13, 2012, in Tacoma at the age of 92.

Washington State Senate
Preceded by Ellen Craswell	President pro tempore of the Washington Senate; 1993–2001	Succeeded by Rosa Franklin
