= Montgomery Johnson =

American political consultant (1923–2005)

Chair of the Washington Republican Party
- In office 1964–1971
- Preceded by: William C. Goodloe
- Succeeded by: Earl Davenport

Personal details
- Born: June 6, 1923 Seattle, Washington, U.S.
- Died: May 21, 2005 (aged 81)
- Children: 4
- Education: University of Washington

Charles Montgomery "Gummie" Johnson (June 6, 1923 – May 21, 2005) was an American publicist and political consultant who was active in Republican party politics in Washington state for nearly 30 years.

== Early life and education ==
Johnson was born in Seattle to a family of outdoor enthusiasts. He received his undergraduate and graduate education at the University of Washington, earning a master's degree in forestry in 1950. His graduate thesis was on the use of education to prevent forest fires. While at the UW he was elected president of the Associated Students of the University of Washington.

In 1948 Johnson married his first wife, Bette Maples, with whom he had four children.

== Career ==
=== Public relations ===
In 1951, Johnson was hired as the first public relations director for the Washington Education Association, Washington's teachers' union. He was subsequently retained to work as PR head for Weyerhauser.

=== Republican party ===
In 1963, Johnson was selected to serve as chairman of the campaign committee for Dan Evans' gubernatorial race. The election of Evans, who at 39 became Washington's youngest governor, placed Johnson at the center of Washington political life. The following year he was elected the first full-time chairman of the Washington State Republican Party, a post he held for the next seven years, during which he led a purge of John Birch Society members from Republican ranks and served as an executive member of the Republican National Committee. Johnson was an outspoken pro-choice advocate and promoter of Native American issues.

=== Private business ===
Stepping down from chairmanship of the Republican party, Johnson formed a political consulting firm with his second wife, Ann Quantock, a Democratic lobbyist. One of the Olympia-based C. Montgomery Johnson Associates' first clients was the Washington Association of Community Colleges, the first of several public sector education clients that would retain his firm. Among his firm's other clients were the Yakima Nation, and Democratic governor Dixy Lee Ray, whose 1976 and 1980 campaigns he managed.

== Personal life and legacy ==
A heavy cigar smoker, Johnson was known as an opinionated character with sometimes profane mannerisms.

Johnson drafted an unpublished book, What Shall I Tell My People About Politics? which he described as a "real-life handbook for precinct committeemen."
