= 1996 Washington gubernatorial election =

- November 5, 1996
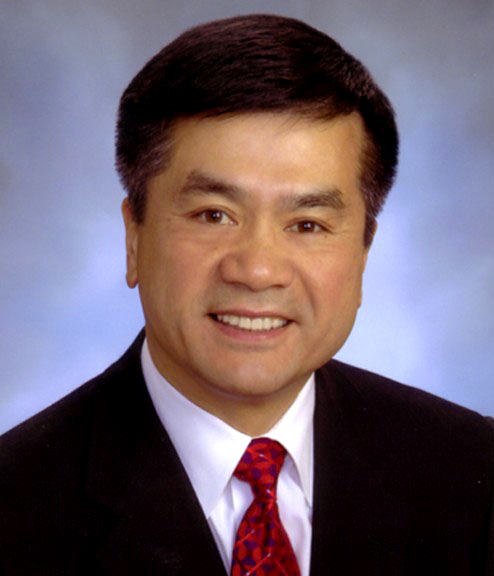

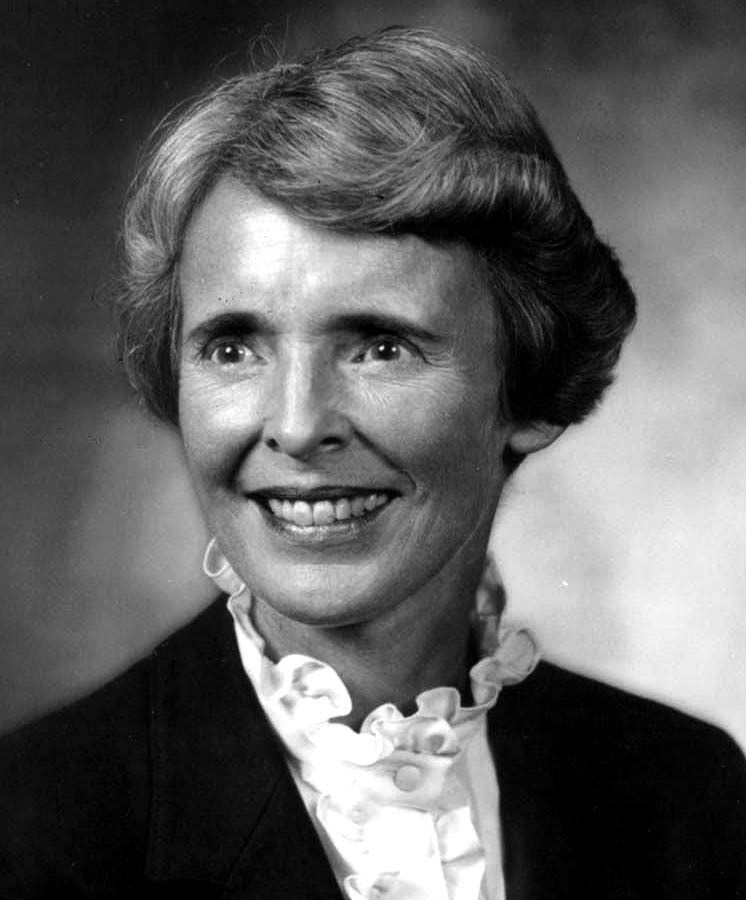
| Nominee | Gary Locke | Ellen Craswell |
| Party | Democratic | Republican |
| Popular vote | 1,296,492 | 940,538 |
| Percentage | 57.96% | 42.04% |
- County results Locke: 50–60% 60–70% Craswell: 50–60% 60–70%
Governor before election
Mike Lowry
Democratic
Elected Governor
Gary Locke
Democratic

The 1996 Washington gubernatorial election was held on November 5, 1996. Though eligible for a second term, incumbent governor Mike Lowry chose not to run for reelection following a series of personal and public scandals, including allegations of sexual harassment. This gubernatorial race was especially significant in that it resulted in the first Asian American governor in the mainland United States (after George Ariyoshi of island state Hawaii), Democrat Gary Locke.

== Primary election ==
=== Candidates ===
==== Democratic ====
- Max Englerius
- Jay Inslee, U.S. representative from the 4th congressional district and future governor
- Gary Locke, King County Executive and former state representative
- Norm Rice, current mayor of Seattle
- Mohammad H. Said
- Briam Zetlen

==== Republican ====
- Nona Brazier
- Ellen Craswell, president pro tempore of the Washington Senate
- Dale Foreman, majority leader of the Washington House of Representatives
- Warren E. Hanson
- Norm Maleng, King County Prosecuting Attorney
- Pam Roach, state senator
- Bob Tharp
- Jim Waldo

=== Results ===
Results by county Locke: 20–30%; 30–40%; Rice: 20–30%; Craswell: 20–30%; 30–40%; Foreman: 20–30%; 30–40%; 40–50%; 50–60%; Inslee: 20–30%; 30–40%

Blanket primary results
| Party | Candidate | Votes | % |
|---|---|---|---|
| Democratic | Gary Locke | 287,762 | 23.65% |
| Democratic | Norm Rice | 212,888 | 17.50% |
| Republican | Ellen Craswell | 185,680 | 15.26% |
| Republican | Dale Foreman | 162,615 | 13.37% |
| Democratic | Jay Inslee | 118,571 | 9.75% |
| Republican | Norm Maleng | 109,088 | 8.97% |
| Republican | Jim Waldo | 63,854 | 5.25% |
| Republican | Pam Roach | 29,533 | 2.43% |
| Republican | Nona Brazier | 21,237 | 1.75% |
| Democratic | Brian Zetlen | 6,152 | 0.51% |
| Republican | Warren E. Hanson | 4,886 | 0.40% |
| Republican | Bob Tharp | 4,825 | 0.40% |
| Socialist Workers | Jeff Powers | 3,742 | 0.31% |
| Democratic | Mohammad H. Said | 3,007 | 0.25% |
| Democratic | Max Englerius | 2,837 | 0.23% |
| Total votes | | 1,216,677 | 100.00% |

== General election ==
=== Candidates ===
- Gary Locke (D), King County Executive and former state representative
  - Third-generation Chinese-American
  - Campaigned on election reform, worker retraining, and the development of social services
  - Cultivated an image of technocratic expertise
- Ellen Craswell (R), president pro tempore of the Washington Senate
  - Born-again Christian
  - Campaigned on tax cuts, restructuring of state government, and an application of biblical principles to social reform
  - Likened her policy positions to Reaganite conservatism, espousing a philosophy of small government, rights and freedoms, together with moral values

=== Campaign controversies ===
- Gary Locke's race drew many donors from the Asian-American community, including local Buddhist temples. He also raised significant funds from national donors in California and New York.
- Ellen Craswell integrated evangelical prayer networks with her fundraising and mobilization network, reaching more than 1000 small donors in October, whereas Locke received large contributions from business groups and Seattle elites.
- Craswell opposed expanding school funding and suggested cutting English as a second language programs, delegating curriculum control to local school boards, and eliminating the superintendent of public instruction.
- An independent political action committee made false claims that two sitting senators had endorsed Locke in a mailer. They later recanted.
- The WA State GOP ran television ads, stating Locke's support for a harm reduction program including sex education, counseling and condom distribution provided material support for prostitution.

=== Debates ===
- Complete video of debate, September 26, 1996 - C-SPAN
- Complete video of debate, October 9, 1996 - C-SPAN

=== Results ===
1996 Washington gubernatorial election
| Party | Candidate | Votes | % | ±% |
|---|---|---|---|---|
| Democratic | Gary Locke | 1,296,492 | 57.96% | +5.80% |
| Republican | Ellen Craswell | 940,538 | 42.04% | −5.80% |
| Total votes | | 2,237,030 | 100.00% | N/A |
| Democratic hold | | | | |

==== By county ====
This is the most recent gubernatorial election in which Kittitas County voted for a Democrat.

| County | Gary Locke Democratic | | Ellen Craswell Republican | | Margin | | Total votes cast |
| County | # | % | # | % | # | % | Total votes cast |
|---|---|---|---|---|---|---|---|
| Adams | 1,829 | 40.13% | 2,729 | 59.87% | -900 | -19.75% | 4,558 |
| Asotin | 3,696 | 50.89% | 3,567 | 49.11% | 129 | 1.78% | 7,263 |
| Benton | 25,899 | 48.34% | 27,682 | 51.66% | -1,783 | -3.33% | 53,581 |
| Chelan | 9,928 | 42.23% | 13,584 | 57.77% | -3,656 | -15.55% | 23,512 |
| Clallam | 14,536 | 49.31% | 14,941 | 50.69% | -405 | -1.37% | 29,477 |
| Clark | 58,400 | 52.65% | 52,525 | 47.35% | 5,875 | 5.30% | 110,925 |
| Columbia | 863 | 44.10% | 1,094 | 55.90% | -231 | -11.80% | 1,957 |
| Cowlitz | 19,175 | 58.07% | 13,843 | 41.93% | 5,332 | 16.15% | 33,018 |
| Douglas | 4,353 | 40.27% | 6,456 | 59.73% | -2,103 | -19.46% | 10,809 |
| Ferry | 1,251 | 44.76% | 1,544 | 55.24% | -293 | -10.48% | 2,795 |
| Franklin | 5,685 | 46.66% | 6,499 | 53.34% | -814 | -6.68% | 12,184 |
| Garfield | 511 | 40.56% | 749 | 59.44% | -238 | -18.89% | 1,260 |
| Grant | 8,916 | 41.04% | 12,807 | 58.96% | -3,891 | -17.91% | 21,723 |
| Grays Harbor | 15,851 | 60.66% | 10,278 | 39.34% | 5,573 | 21.33% | 26,129 |
| Island | 14,874 | 52.59% | 13,409 | 47.41% | 1,465 | 5.18% | 28,283 |
| Jefferson | 8,268 | 59.18% | 5,702 | 40.82% | 2,566 | 18.37% | 13,970 |
| King | 490,284 | 67.03% | 241,134 | 32.97% | 249,150 | 34.06% | 731,418 |
| Kitsap | 50,121 | 54.84% | 41,275 | 45.16% | 8,846 | 9.68% | 91,396 |
| Kittitas | 6,609 | 53.17% | 5,822 | 46.83% | 787 | 6.33% | 12,431 |
| Klickitat | 3,337 | 49.20% | 3,445 | 50.80% | -108 | -1.59% | 6,782 |
| Lewis | 11,377 | 42.15% | 15,613 | 57.85% | -4,236 | -15.69% | 26,990 |
| Lincoln | 1,947 | 38.92% | 3,055 | 61.08% | -1,108 | -22.15% | 5,002 |
| Mason | 11,421 | 55.30% | 9,231 | 44.70% | 2,190 | 10.60% | 20,652 |
| Okanogan | 5,489 | 42.36% | 7,468 | 57.64% | -1,979 | -15.27% | 12,957 |
| Pacific | 5,699 | 62.85% | 3,368 | 37.15% | 2,331 | 25.71% | 9,067 |
| Pend Oreille | 2,308 | 46.94% | 2,609 | 53.06% | -301 | -6.12% | 4,917 |
| Pierce | 131,194 | 55.43% | 105,500 | 44.57% | 25,694 | 10.86% | 236,694 |
| San Juan | 4,567 | 63.19% | 2,660 | 36.81% | 1,907 | 26.39% | 7,227 |
| Skagit | 21,522 | 52.81% | 19,232 | 47.19% | 2,290 | 5.62% | 40,754 |
| Skamania | 1,915 | 52.04% | 1,765 | 47.96% | 150 | 4.08% | 3,680 |
| Snohomish | 126,425 | 57.40% | 93,827 | 42.60% | 32,598 | 14.80% | 220,252 |
| Spokane | 84,740 | 53.30% | 74,249 | 46.70% | 10,491 | 6.60% | 158,989 |
| Stevens | 6,687 | 40.62% | 9,777 | 59.38% | -3,090 | -18.77% | 16,464 |
| Thurston | 53,106 | 61.10% | 33,813 | 38.90% | 19,293 | 22.20% | 86,919 |
| Wahkiakum | 1,013 | 56.47% | 781 | 43.53% | 232 | 12.93% | 1,794 |
| Walla Walla | 9,710 | 50.11% | 9,669 | 49.89% | 41 | 0.21% | 19,379 |
| Whatcom | 34,679 | 54.02% | 29,517 | 45.98% | 5,162 | 8.04% | 64,196 |
| Whitman | 8,743 | 55.60% | 6,981 | 44.40% | 1,762 | 11.21% | 15,724 |
| Yakima | 29,564 | 47.76% | 32,338 | 52.24% | -2,774 | -4.48% | 61,902 |
| Totals | 1,296,492 | 57.96% | 940,538 | 42.04% | 355,954 | 15.91% | 2,237,030 |

==== Counties that flipped from Republican to Democratic ====
- Asotin
- Clark
- Cowlitz
- Island
- Kitsap
- Mason
- Skagit
- Skamania
- Spokane
- Wahkiakum
- Walla Walla
- Whatcom
- Whitman

=== Subsequent controversies ===
The Washington State Public Disclosure Commission opened an investigation in 1997 relating to campaign contributions received from the Chinese Americans and foreign nationals. In example, the Ling Chen Zhe Buddhist temple, where a $5000 cash donation was accepted, returned and five $1000 donations were given in its place. Together with official campaign events held at the Harmony Palace restaurant, co-owned by a leader of the Chinese gang Ghost Shadows. In total, six fundraising events for the Locke campaign were organized by John Huang, who donated $750 personally, with similar occurrences at each one.

This investigation was subsequently picked up (as part of a probe into the 1996 campaign finance scandal) by the IRS, who requested records extending to 1990, the time of Locke's campaign for King County executive. Locke testified before Congress in 2006 and denied knowingly accepting campaign contributions from Chinese foreign agents. In 2015, the Locke gubernatorial campaign plead guilty to breaking three campaign fundraising laws relating to the limits for individual contribution, timely reporting of contributions, and failure to deposit cash contributions.

Ellen Craswell suffered from cancer immediately following the election, retired in 2005, and died in 2008.
