= 1992 Washington gubernatorial election =

- November 3, 1992
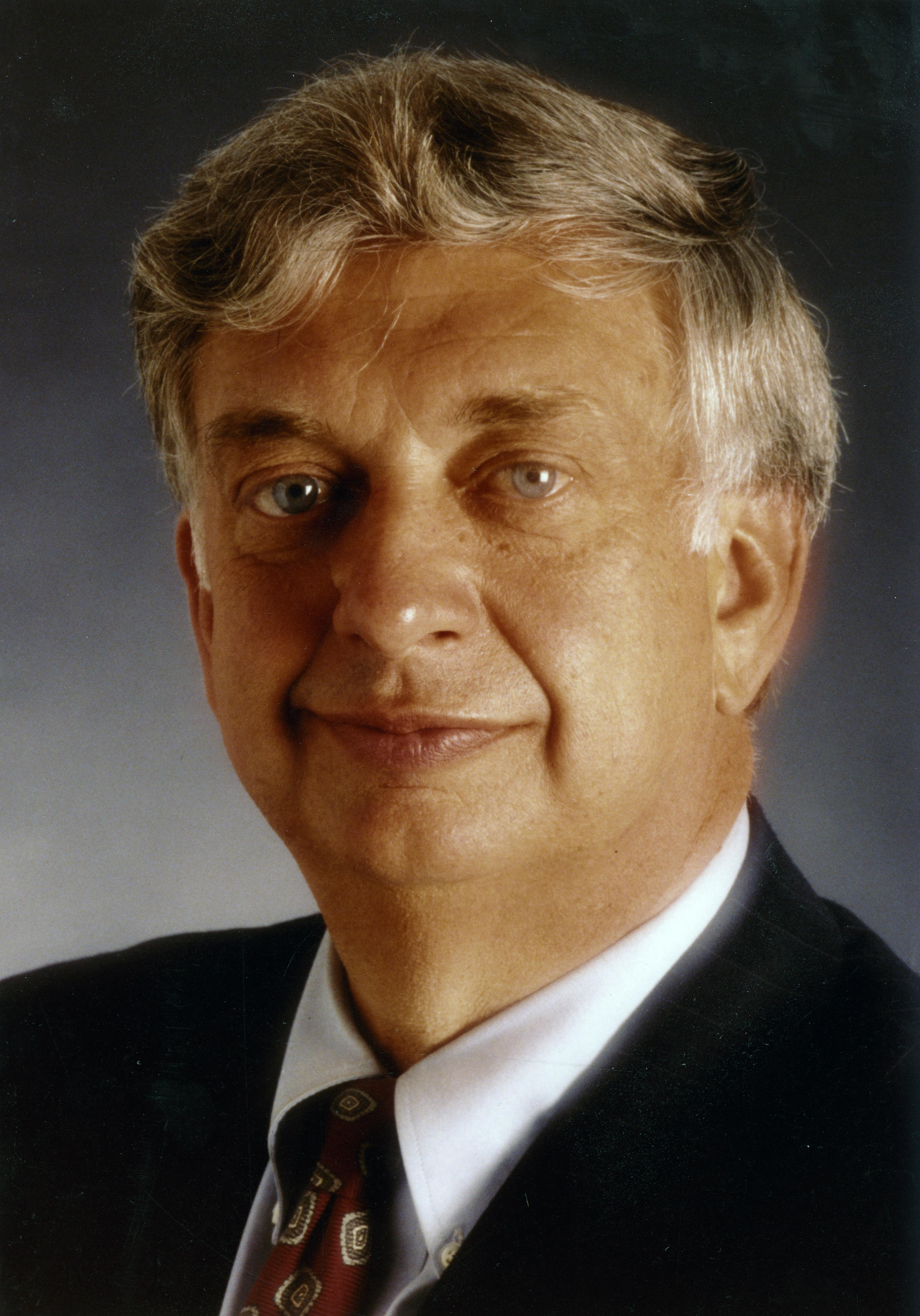

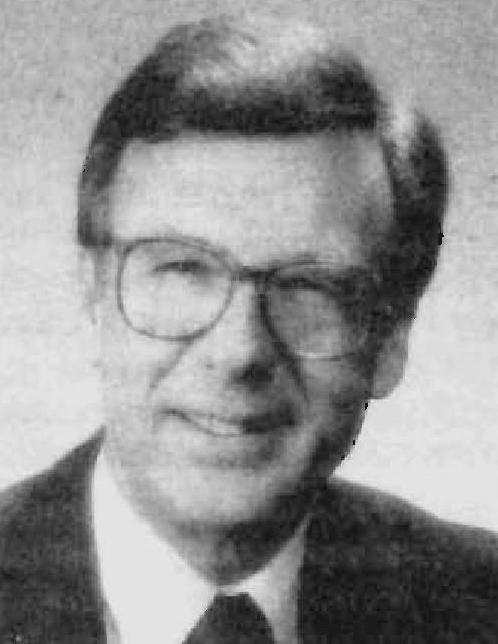
Nominee	Mike Lowry	Ken Eikenberry
Party	Democratic	Republican
Popular vote	1,184,315	1,086,216
Percentage	52.16%	47.84%
- County results Lowry: 50–60% 60–70% Eikenberry: 50–60% 60–70% 70–80%
Governor before election
Booth Gardner
Democratic
Elected Governor
Mike Lowry
Democratic

The 1992 Washington gubernatorial election was held on November 3, 1992. Incumbent Democratic Governor Booth Gardner chose not to run for a third term. This resulted in an open race for Governor of Washington in which Democrat Mike Lowry narrowly defeated Republican Ken Eikenberry. This is the last time that a gubernatorial nominee and a lieutenant gubernatorial nominee of different political parties were elected governor and lieutenant governor of Washington.

== Primary election ==
=== Candidates ===
==== Democratic ====
- Mike Lowry, former U.S. Representative for the 7th congressional district and unsuccessful Democratic nominee for the United States Senate in 1988
- Joseph E. King, speaker state representative
- Sally McQuown
- Richard "Onery Dick" Short
- Wayne Madsen

==== Republican ====
- Ken Eikenberry, State Attorney General
- Sid Morrison, U.S. Representative for the 4th congressional district
- Dan McDonald, state senator
- Bob Tharp

=== Results ===
Blanket primary results by county: Lowry: 20–30%; 30–40%; Eikenberry: 20–30%; 30–40%; Morrison: 20–30%; 30–40%; 40–50%; 50–60%; 60–70%; 70–80%; King: 20–30%

Blanket primary results
Party	Candidate	Votes	%
Democratic	Mike Lowry	337,783	29.23%
Republican	Ken Eikenberry	258,553	22.37%
Republican	Sid Morrison	250,418	21.67%
Republican	Dan McDonald	144,050	12.47%
Democratic	Joseph E. King	96,480	8.35%
Democratic	Sally McQuown	31,175	2.70%
Democratic	Richard "Onery Dick" Short	8,470	0.73%
Republican	Bob Tharp	8,103	0.70%
Democratic	Wayne Madsen	7,860	0.68%
Independent	Mike The Mover	6,645	0.58%
Socialist Workers	Kathleen Wheeler	6,068	0.53%
Total votes		1,155,605	100.00%

== General election ==
=== Candidates ===
- Mike Lowry (D), former U.S. Representative for the 7th congressional district
- Ken Eikenberry (R), State Attorney General

=== Debates ===
- Complete video of debate, October 27, 1992 - C-SPAN

=== Polling ===
Poll source	Date(s) administered	Sample size	Margin of error	Mike Lowry (D)	Ken Eikenberry (R)	Undecided
Tacoma News Tribune	October 1992	–	–	47%	43%	10%

=== Endorsements ===
Mike Lowry (D)

Federal officials

- Sid Morrison, U.S. representative from Washington's 4th congressional district (Republican)

Statewide officials

- Booth Gardner, incumbent governor of Washington

=== Results ===
1992 Washington gubernatorial election
Party	Candidate	Votes	%	±%
Democratic	Mike Lowry	1,184,315	52.16%	−10.05%
Republican	Ken Eikenberry	1,086,216	47.84%	+10.05%
Total votes		2,270,531	100.00%	N/A
Democratic hold				

==== By county ====
Ken Eikenberry is the last Republican to have carried Whatcom County in a gubernatorial election; this election is the only one since 1960 in which Whatcom County has backed the losing candidate.

County	Mike Lowry Democratic		Ken Eikenberry Republican		Margin		Total votes cast
County	#	%	#	%	#	%	Total votes cast
Adams	1,750	38.40%	2,807	61.60%	-1,057	-23.20%	4,557
Asotin	3,436	45.99%	4,035	54.01%	-599	-8.02%	7,471
Benton	21,872	42.48%	29,614	57.52%	-7,742	-15.04%	51,486
Chelan	8,666	37.60%	14,379	62.40%	-5,713	-24.79%	23,045
Clallam	12,049	42.46%	16,330	57.54%	-4,281	-15.09%	28,379
Clark	48,292	46.40%	55,780	53.60%	-7,488	-7.20%	104,072
Columbia	599	31.33%	1,313	68.67%	-714	-37.34%	1,912
Cowlitz	16,677	48.97%	17,381	51.03%	-704	-2.07%	34,058
Douglas	4,139	37.89%	6,785	62.11%	-2,646	-24.22%	10,924
Ferry	1,062	42.13%	1,459	57.87%	-397	-15.75%	2,521
Franklin	5,474	45.60%	6,531	54.40%	-1,057	-8.80%	12,005
Garfield	426	32.67%	878	67.33%	-452	-34.66%	1,304
Grant	7,991	36.86%	13,688	63.14%	-5,697	-26.28%	21,679
Grays Harbor	14,986	55.41%	12,060	44.59%	2,926	10.82%	27,046
Island	12,429	45.81%	14,704	54.19%	-2,275	-8.38%	27,133
Jefferson	7,047	54.77%	5,820	45.23%	1,227	9.54%	12,867
King	466,506	60.44%	305,326	39.56%	161,180	20.88%	771,832
Kitsap	42,562	48.69%	44,852	51.31%	-2,290	-2.62%	87,414
Kittitas	6,232	51.04%	5,978	48.96%	254	2.08%	12,210
Klickitat	2,883	43.45%	3,752	56.55%	869	13.10%	6,635
Lewis	7,938	29.46%	19,003	70.54%	-11,065	-41.07%	26,941
Lincoln	1,717	34.76%	3,223	65.24%	-1,506	-30.49%	4,940
Mason	9,548	48.57%	10,111	51.43%	-563	-2.86%	19,659
Okanogan	5,139	39.99%	7,712	60.01%	-2,573	-20.02%	12,851
Pacific	4,933	53.70%	4,254	46.30%	679	7.39%	9,187
Pend Oreille	1,919	41.31%	2,726	58.69%	-807	-17.37%	4,645
Pierce	120,968	50.70%	117,623	49.30%	3,345	1.40%	238,591
San Juan	3,758	54.61%	3,123	45.39%	635	9.23%	6,881
Skagit	18,784	46.56%	21,560	53.44%	-2,776	-6.88%	40,344
Skamania	1,657	46.81%	1,883	53.19%	-226	-6.38%	3,540
Snohomish	117,000	52.42%	106,196	47.58%	10,804	4.84%	223,196
Spokane	74,262	44.33%	93,269	55.67%	-19,007	-11.35%	167,531
Stevens	5,447	37.15%	9,217	62.85%	-3,770	-25.71%	14,664
Thurston	46,666	55.75%	37,038	44.25%	9,628	11.50%	83,704
Wahkiakum	775	44.51%	966	55.49%	-191	-10.97%	1,741
Walla Walla	8,330	42.36%	11,333	57.64%	-3,003	-15.27%	19,663
Whatcom	31,113	49.49%	31,756	50.51%	-643	-1.02%	62,869
Whitman	8,459	48.78%	8,883	51.22%	-424	-2.44%	17,342
Yakima	30,824	48.40%	32,868	51.60%	-2,044	-3.21%	63,692
Totals	1,184,315	52.16%	1,086,216	47.84%	98,099	4.32%	2,270,531

==== Counties that flipped from Democratic to Republican ====
- Asotin
- Chelan
- Clallam
- Clark
- Douglas
- Ferry
- Garfield
- Grant
- Island
- Kitsap
- Klickitat
- Lincoln
- Mason
- Okanogan
- Pend Oreille
- Skagit
- Skamania
- Spokane
- Wahkiakum
- Walla Walla
- Whatcom
- Whitman
