= Constitutional Law PAC =

Former political action committie

The Constitutional Law PAC was a center-right political action committee formed in the state of Washington to help elect candidates to the Washington Supreme Court and Washington State Court of Appeals.

Conservatives expressed concerns that the group's leadership was too liberal, while liberals criticized the committee as a conservative attempt to influence judicial elections. The center-left FairPAC was started in response.

== Candidate Evaluation Committee ==
The Candidate Evaluation Committee was chaired by Former King County Prosecutor Christopher T. Bayley a moderate Republican. Members of the committee were Seattle labor attorney Jerry Rubin of the law firm Stoel Rives (Democrat), Chehalis attorney Renee’ Remund of the firm Vander Stoep, Remund and Blinks (Republican) and Senior Pierce County Deputy Prosecutor Phil Sorenson (Democrat). In 2006 the committee formed a bi-partisan Candidate Evaluation Committee to issue rating for appellate level judicial candidates in Washington State. The committee issued two ratings for each candidate: "Judicial Qualifications" and "Judicial Philosophy".

=== Judicial Qualifications ===
The Judicial Qualifications rating relied on similar criteria to those used by the King County Bar Association and other bar associations. The possible ratings were “Very Well Qualified”, “Well Qualified”, “Qualified” and “Unqualified”.

=== Judicial Philosophy ===
The committee based its "Judicial Philosophy" rating reflects on their understanding of a candidate’s “deference to the law, constitution and established legal precedent.” An “A” was used to indicate that the candidate showed complete deference to the law, constitution and established legal precedent. A “B” was awarded for significant deference, a “C” for partial deference, a “D” for insufficient deference and an “F” for little or no deference.

=== Ratings ===
The committee rated four incumbent judges as “Very Well Qualified”, Chief Justice Gerry L. Alexander, Judge Ronald E. Cox of the Court of Appeals, Judge Marlin Appelwick of the Court of Appeals, and Judge David Armstrong of the Court of Appeals. State Senator Stephen Johnson was the only non-incumbent rated Very Well Qualified.

Two candidates were rated “Unqualified”, conservative Supreme Court challenger Jeanette Burrage and Joel M. Penoyar who was appointed to the Court of Appeals in 2005.

== Leadership ==
- Chairman of the Board: Former Republican Senator Slade Gorton
- Board Members: Christopher T. Bayley, Anthony Sternola, Marianne Jones and Alex Hays
- Executive Director: Alex Hays
- Chairman, Candidate Evaluation Committee: Christopher T. Bayley.
