= Dale Foreman =

American politician, attorney and farmer from Washington

Majority Leader of the Washington House of Representatives
- In office January 9, 1995 – January 13, 1997
- Preceded by: W. Kim Peery
- Succeeded by: Barbara Lisk

Member of the Washington House of Representatives from the 12th district
- In office January 11, 1993 – January 13, 1997
- Preceded by: Alex McLean
- Succeeded by: Linda Evans Parlette

Chair of the Washington Republican Party
- In office January 1, 1996 – January 1, 2000
- Preceded by: Ken Eikenberry
- Succeeded by: Don Benton

Personal details
- Party: Republican
- Spouse: Gail Foreman
- Occupation: Politician, farmer, attorney

Dale M. Foreman is an American politician, attorney, and farmer from Washington. Foreman is a former Republican Party member of Washington State House of Representatives. Foreman is the founder of Foreman Fruit and Land Company.

== Education ==
In 1975, Foreman earned a J.D. degree from Harvard Law School.

== Career ==
As a farmer, Foreman is a fruit grower in Washington. Foreman's company is Foreman Fruit and Land Company (formerly Keystone Ranch), which farms 2,000 acres of apples, pears and cherries. Foreman is a former chairman of the U.S. Apple Association.

Foreman served as majority leader of the Washington State House of Representatives and as chair of the Washington State Republican Party. A Republican, Foreman was an unsuccessful candidate for Governor of Washington in the 1996 election.

== Awards ==
- 2013 Apple Citizen of the Year. Presented at Washington State Apple Blossom Festival.

== Personal life ==
Foreman's wife is Gail Foreman.
