= Mike Lowry =

Governor of Washington from 1993 to 1997

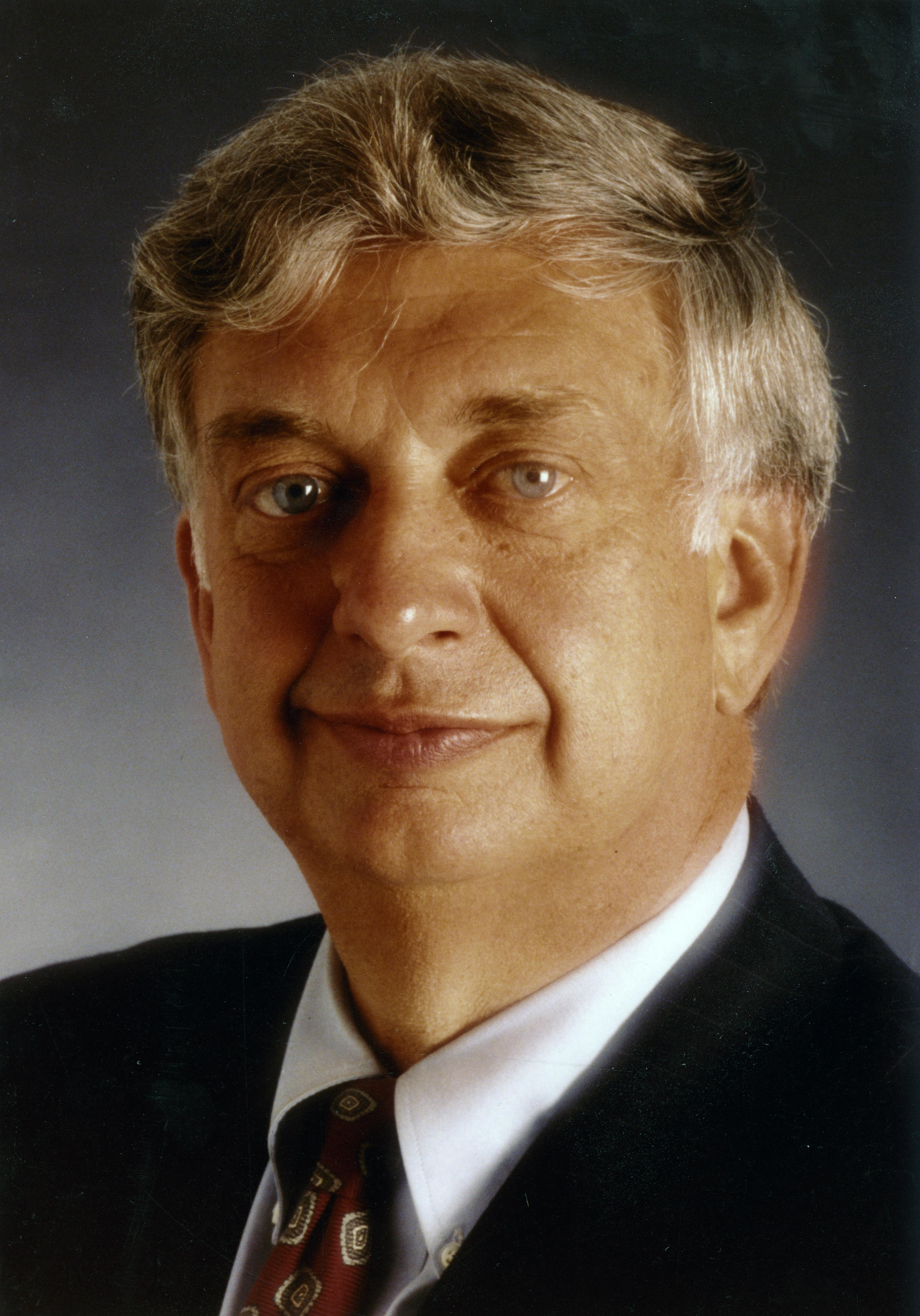

20th Governor of Washington
- In office January 13, 1993 – January 15, 1997
- Lieutenant: Joel Pritchard
- Preceded by: Booth Gardner
- Succeeded by: Gary Locke

Member of the U.S. House of Representatives from Washington's 7th district
- In office January 3, 1979 – January 3, 1989
- Preceded by: John E. Cunningham
- Succeeded by: Jim McDermott

Member of the King County Council from the 6th district
- In office January 1, 1976 – January 3, 1979
- Preceded by: Tom Forsythe
- Succeeded by: Pat Thorpe

Personal details
- Born: Michael Edward Lowry; March 8, 1939 St. John, Washington, U.S.
- Died: May 1, 2017 (aged 78) Olympia, Washington, U.S.
- Party: Democratic
- Spouse: Mary Carlson (m. 1968)
- Children: 1
- Education: Washington State University (BA)

Michael Edward Lowry (March 8, 1939 – May 1, 2017) was an American politician who served as the 20th governor of Washington from 1993 to 1997. His political career ended when his deputy press secretary, Susanne Albright, made accusations of sexual misconduct against him. A member of the Democratic Party, Lowry served as a United States representative from Washington's 7th congressional district from 1979 to 1989, and unsuccessfully ran for U.S. Senate in 1983 and 1988.

== Early life ==
Lowry was born and raised in St. John, Washington, son of Helen (nee White) and Robert Lowry. He graduated from Washington State University in 1962.

== Political career ==
Lowry had a brief career working for the Washington State Senate and as a lobbyist for Group Health Cooperative before being elected to the King County Council in 1975. He was elected to the United States House of Representatives from Washington's 7th congressional district in 1978 and served until 1989.

Lowry twice ran unsuccessfully for the United States Senate. In a 1983 special election, he lost to Republican former governor Dan Evans, then an appointed Senator and the incumbent, in a race to replace Democrat Henry "Scoop" Jackson. In 1988, he lost to Slade Gorton, also a Republican, in a close race. Lowry then began working at Seattle University and at an environmental group.

== Governor of Washington (1993–1997) ==
Lowry was elected governor in 1992 and served a single term (to date, he is the last governor of Washington state to serve only one term). His principal policy initiative was a statewide system of health insurance with premiums based on ability to pay. He chose not to run for reelection due to a sexual harassment scandal in which his deputy press secretary, Susanne Albright, accused him of making inappropriate remarks and fondling her. He was an unsuccessful candidate for Commissioner of Public Lands in 2000, and was later active in building affordable housing for Washington's migrant farm workers.

== Personal life ==
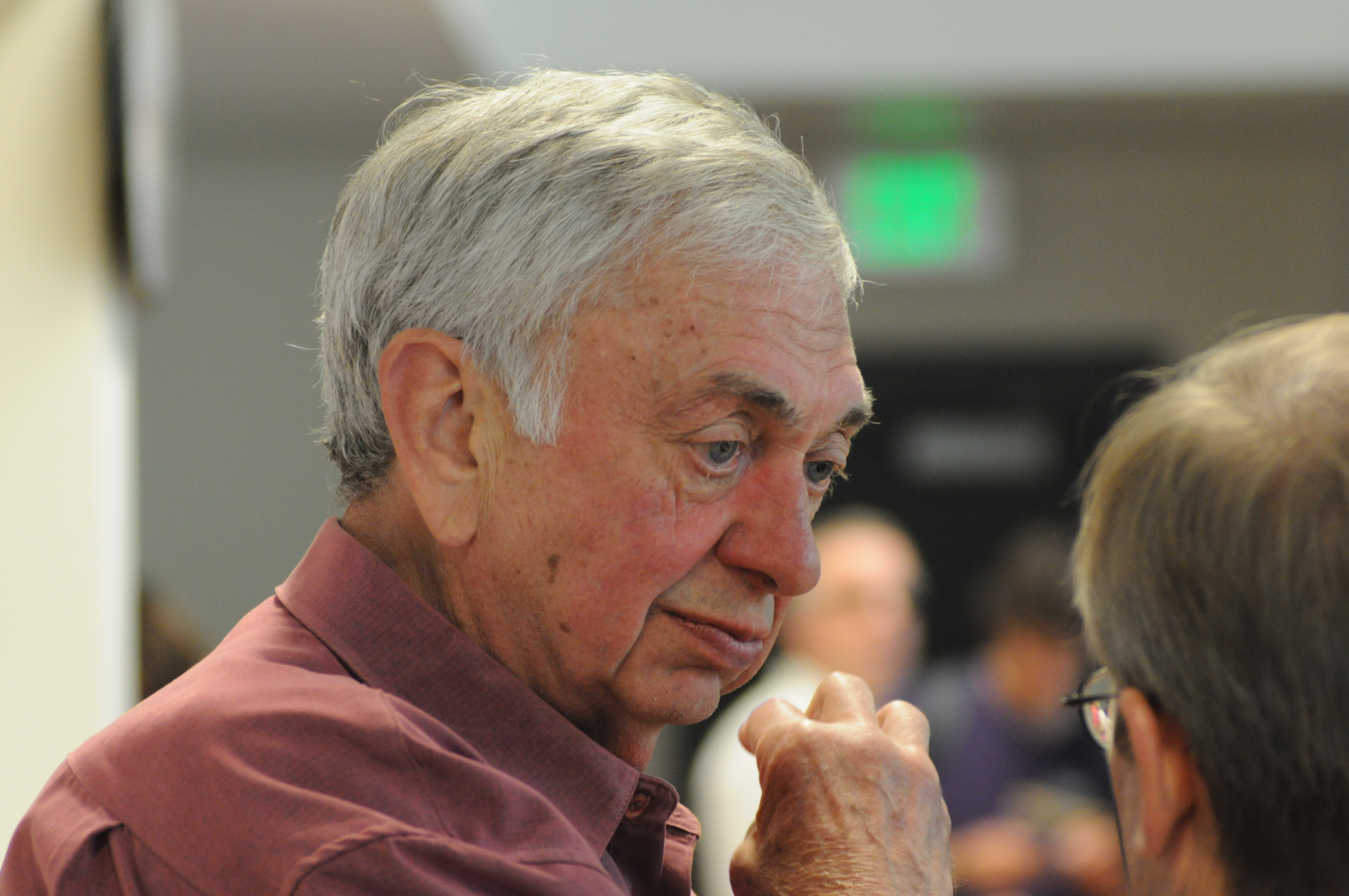
Lowry in 2009

Lowry married Mary Carlson in 1968, and they had a daughter. He died from complications of a stroke on May 1, 2017, at the age of 78.

During Lowry's career, he was often compared to Yasser Arafat by both media and political opponents in the state of Washington, due to a perceived similarity in physical appearance between the two. According to some reports, Lowry shaved off a beard he formerly sported specifically to avoid comparisons.

U.S. House of Representatives
Preceded by Jack Cunningham	Member of the U.S. House of Representatives from Washington's 7th congressional district 1979–1989	Succeeded by Jim McDermott
Party political offices
Preceded by Henry M. Jackson	Democratic nominee for U.S. Senator from Washington (Class 1); 1983, 1988	Succeeded by Ron Sims
Preceded by Booth Gardner	Democratic nominee for Governor of Washington; 1992	Succeeded by Gary Locke
Political offices
Preceded by Booth Gardner	Governor of Washington; 1993–1997	Succeeded by Gary Locke
