= Gary Locke =

American politician (born 1950)

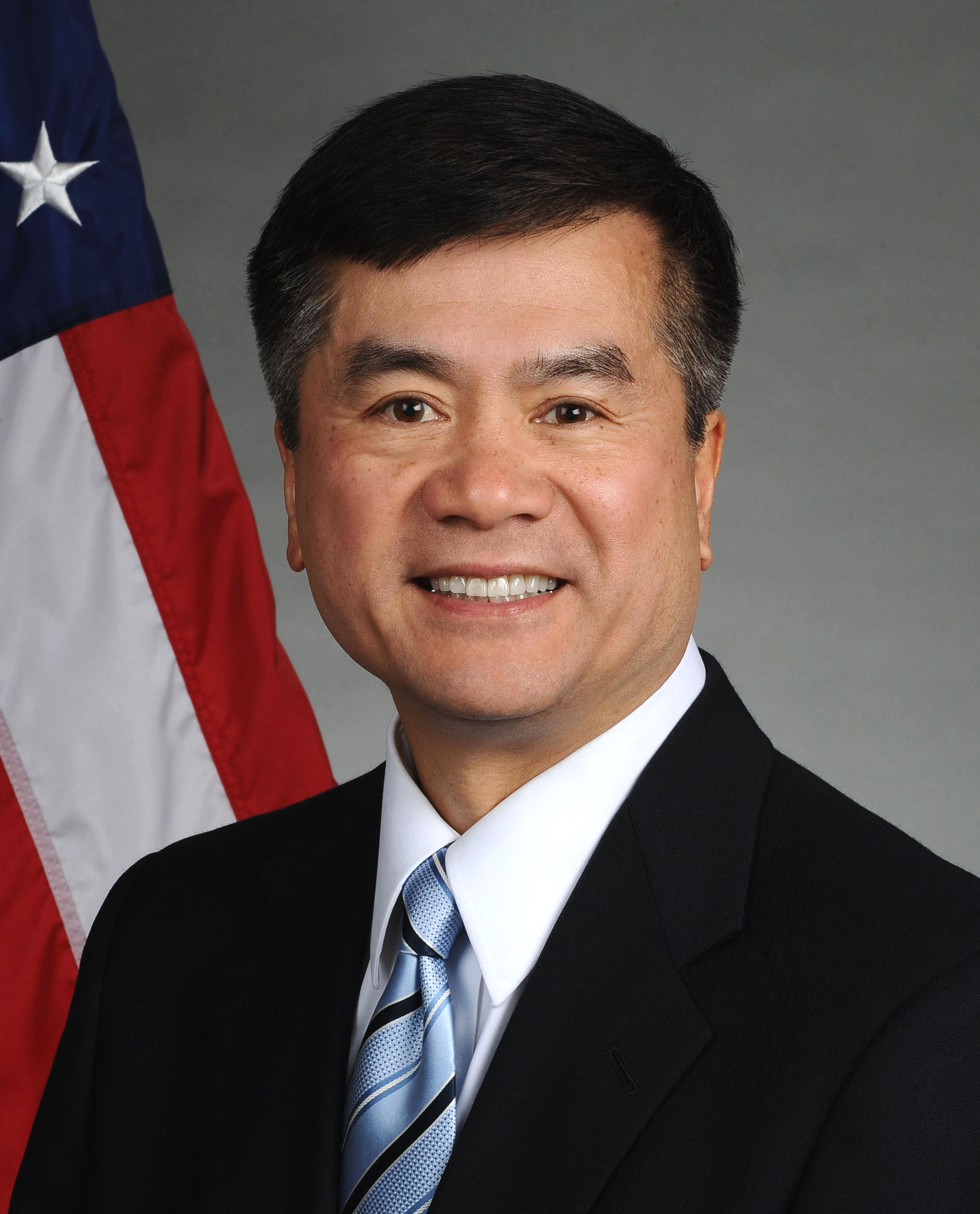
- Official portrait, 2009

President of Bellevue College
- Acting
- In office June 15, 2020 – July 1, 2023
- Preceded by: Jerry Weber
- Succeeded by: David May

10th United States Ambassador to China
- In office August 16, 2011 – March 1, 2014
- President: Barack Obama
- Preceded by: Jon Huntsman Jr.
- Succeeded by: Max Baucus

36th United States Secretary of Commerce
- In office March 26, 2009 – August 1, 2011
- President: Barack Obama
- Deputy: Dennis Hightower; Rebecca Blank (acting)
- Preceded by: Carlos Gutierrez
- Succeeded by: John Bryson

21st Governor of Washington
- In office January 15, 1997 – January 12, 2005
- Lieutenant: Brad Owen
- Preceded by: Mike Lowry
- Succeeded by: Christine Gregoire

5th King County Executive
- In office January 3, 1994 – January 15, 1997
- Preceded by: Tim Hill
- Succeeded by: Ron Sims

Member of the Washington House of Representatives from the 37th district
- In office January 10, 1983 – January 3, 1994
- Preceded by: Peggy Maxie
- Succeeded by: Vivian Caver

Personal details
- Born: Gary Faye Locke; January 21, 1950 (age 76) Seattle, Washington, U.S.
- Party: Democratic
- Spouse(s): Unknown (divorced) Mona Lee (m. 1994; div. 2015)
- Children: 3
- Education: Yale University (BA); Boston University (JD)
- Locke's voice Locke on World Trade Week. Recorded May 19, 2009

Chinese name
- Traditional Chinese: 駱家輝
- Simplified Chinese: 骆家辉
Transcriptions
Standard Mandarin
- Hanyu Pinyin: Luò Jiāhuī
Yue: Cantonese
- Yale Romanization: Lok Gāfāi
- Jyutping: Lok^{3} Gaa^{1} fai^{1}
other Yue
- Taishanese: Lok^{2}. Ga^{1}-fui^{1}

Gary Faye Locke (Chinese: 骆家辉; born January 21, 1950) is an American politician, attorney, and former diplomat.

Locke served as the 21st governor of Washington from 1997 to 2005, where he was the first American of Chinese descent governor as well as the first Asian American governor in the contiguous United States. During the Obama administration, Locke served as Secretary of Commerce from 2009 to 2011, and as Ambassador to China from 2011 to 2014, the first Chinese American to serve in the role.

First elected to the Washington House of Representatives in 1982, Locke went on to become King County executive in 1993 before being elected governor in the 1996 election. A former prosecutor by profession, Locke staked out a reputation as a moderate Democrat during his tenure. Reelected in the 2000 gubernatorial election, Locke was chosen by national Democrats to give the party's response to President George W. Bush's 2003 State of the Union Address. Locke declined to run for reelection in 2004.

From June 2020 until July 2023, Locke served as interim president of Bellevue College, the largest of the institutions that make up the Washington Community and Technical Colleges system. Since 2021, Locke has served as the chairman of the Committee of 100.

== Early life ==
Gary Locke was born on January 21, 1950, in Seattle, and spent his early years living in the Yesler Terrace public housing project. Locke is a third-generation Chinese American with paternal ancestry from Jilong village, Taishan, Guangdong.

Locke is the second of five children of James "Jimmy" (Youh K.) Locke, who served as a staff sergeant in the U.S. Fifth Armored Division during World War II. James Locke's wife, Julie, is from Hong Kong, which at that time was a British Crown Colony. His paternal grandfather left China in the 1890s and moved to the United States, where he worked as a houseboy in Olympia, Washington, in exchange for English lessons.

Locke's father was born on October 15, 1917, in Taishan, and moved to the United States in 1931. He died on January 5, 2011, at the age of 93. Locke did not learn to speak English until he was five years old and entered kindergarten.

Locke graduated with honors from Seattle's Franklin High School in 1968. He achieved Eagle Scout rank and received the Distinguished Eagle Scout Award from the Boy Scouts of America. Through a combination of part-time jobs, financial aid, and scholarships, Locke attended Yale University, graduating with a bachelor's degree in political science in 1972. He received his juris doctor from the Boston University School of Law in 1975.

== State of Washington political career ==
Locke has spoken of being inspired by Wing Luke, a Chinese American attorney and politician from Seattle who died in a plane crash in 1965.

In 1982, Locke was elected from a South Seattle district to the Washington House of Representatives, where he served as the chair of the Appropriations Committee. Eleven years later, in 1993, Locke was elected King County's Executive, defeating incumbent liberal Republican Tim Hill.

=== Governor of Washington ===
In 1996, Locke won the Democratic primary and general election for governor of Washington, becoming the first Chinese American governor in United States history. His political committee was fined $2,500 by regulators in 1997 after admitting to state campaign finance law violations.

Locke faced criticism from fellow Democrats for embracing the Republican Party's "no-new-taxes" approach to Washington's budget woes during and after the 2001 economic turmoil. Among his spending-reduction proposals were laying off thousands of state employees; reducing health coverage; freezing most state employees' pay; and cutting funding for nursing homes and programs for the developmentally disabled.

In his final budget, Locke suspended two voter-passed school initiatives and cut state education funding. Supported by the state's political left, former Washington Supreme Court Justice Phil Talmadge announced his plans to challenge Locke in the 2000 Democratic primary, but Talmadge ended his campaign early for health reasons. Locke went on to win reelection in 2000.

==== 2003 State of the Union response and retirement ====
Locke was chosen to give his party's response to George W. Bush's 2003 State of the Union Address. In a surprise move, Locke announced in July 2003 that he would not seek a third term, saying, "Despite my deep love of our state, I want to devote more time to my family."

Susan Paynter, a columnist at the Seattle Post-Intelligencer, suggested that racist slurs, insults, and threats that Locke and his family received, especially after his rebuttal to Bush's State of the Union address, may have played a role in Locke's decision to leave office after two terms. The governor's office received hundreds of threatening letters and emails; others threatened to kill his children. His official portrait, painted by Michele Rushworth, was unveiled in the state capitol by Governor Christine Gregoire on January 4, 2006.

After leaving office, Locke joined the Seattle office of international law firm Davis Wright Tremaine LLP, in their China and governmental-relations practice groups. During the leadup to the 2008 Democratic presidential primary, Locke was Washington co-chairman of Hillary Clinton's campaign.

== National politics ==
On the national stage, Democrats saw Locke as a possible vice-presidential choice. In 1997, he was a guest at the State of the Union address. During the 2004 presidential election, Locke was seen as a potential Cabinet choice for Democratic nominee John Kerry. Locke was mentioned as a potential contender for Secretary of Education or United States Trade Representative under a hypothetical Kerry administration.

=== Secretary of Commerce ===
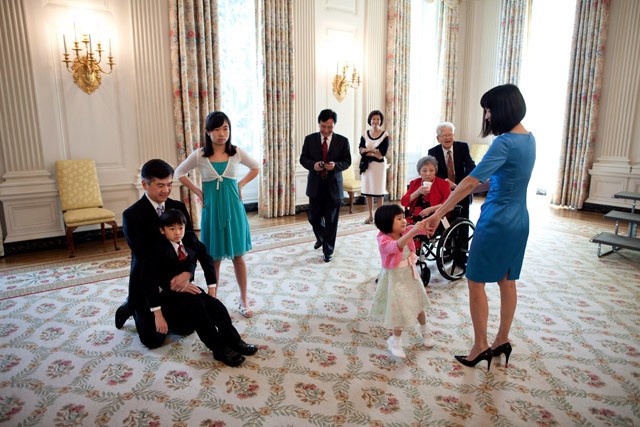
Locke's family awaiting the arrival of President Barack Obama in the White House on May 1, 2009

On December 4, 2008, the Associated Press reported that Locke was a potential candidate for Secretary of the Interior in then-President-elect Barack Obama's cabinet. Eventually, then-Colorado Senator Ken Salazar was nominated for that position instead.

On February 25, 2009, Locke was announced as Obama's choice for Secretary of Commerce, and his nomination was confirmed by the United States Senate by unanimous consent on March 24. Locke was sworn in March 26 by District Judge Richard A. Jones, and by Obama on May 1.

Locke was the first Chinese-American Secretary of Commerce, and one of three Asian Americans in Obama's cabinet, joining Secretary of Energy Steven Chu and Secretary of Veterans Affairs Eric Shinseki. Politico reported Locke was a popular cabinet member among both businesses and the executive branch. A declaration of assets made in March 2011 showed Locke to be the sixth-richest official in the U.S. executive branch.

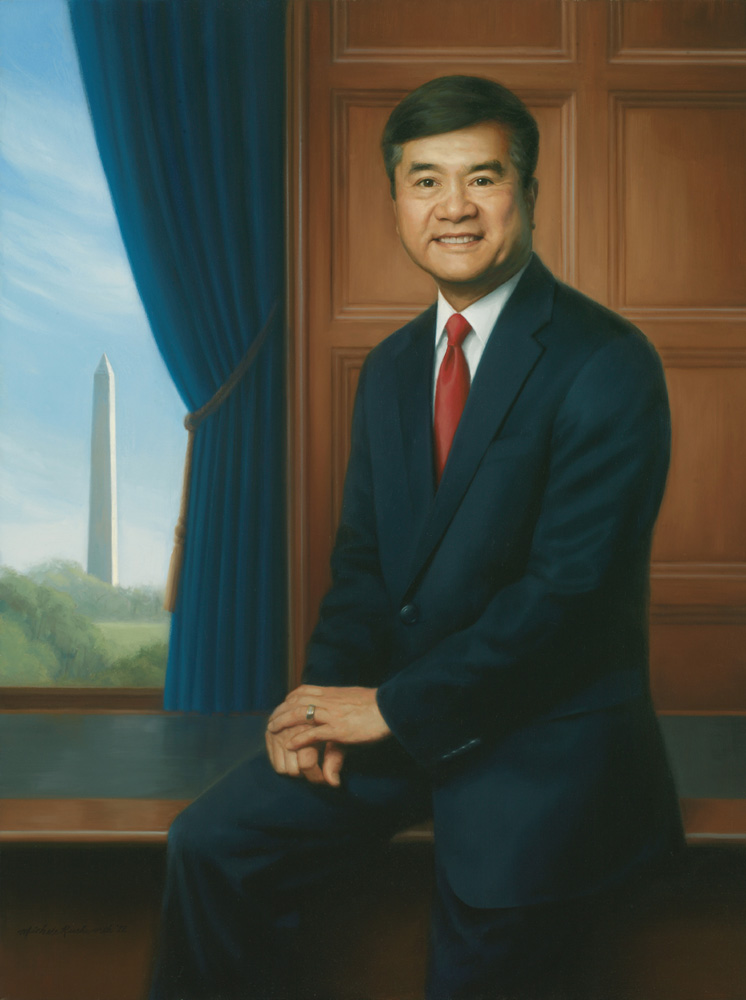
Gary Locke's official portrait for the U.S. Department of Commerce was painted by Michele Rushworth

=== Ambassador to China ===
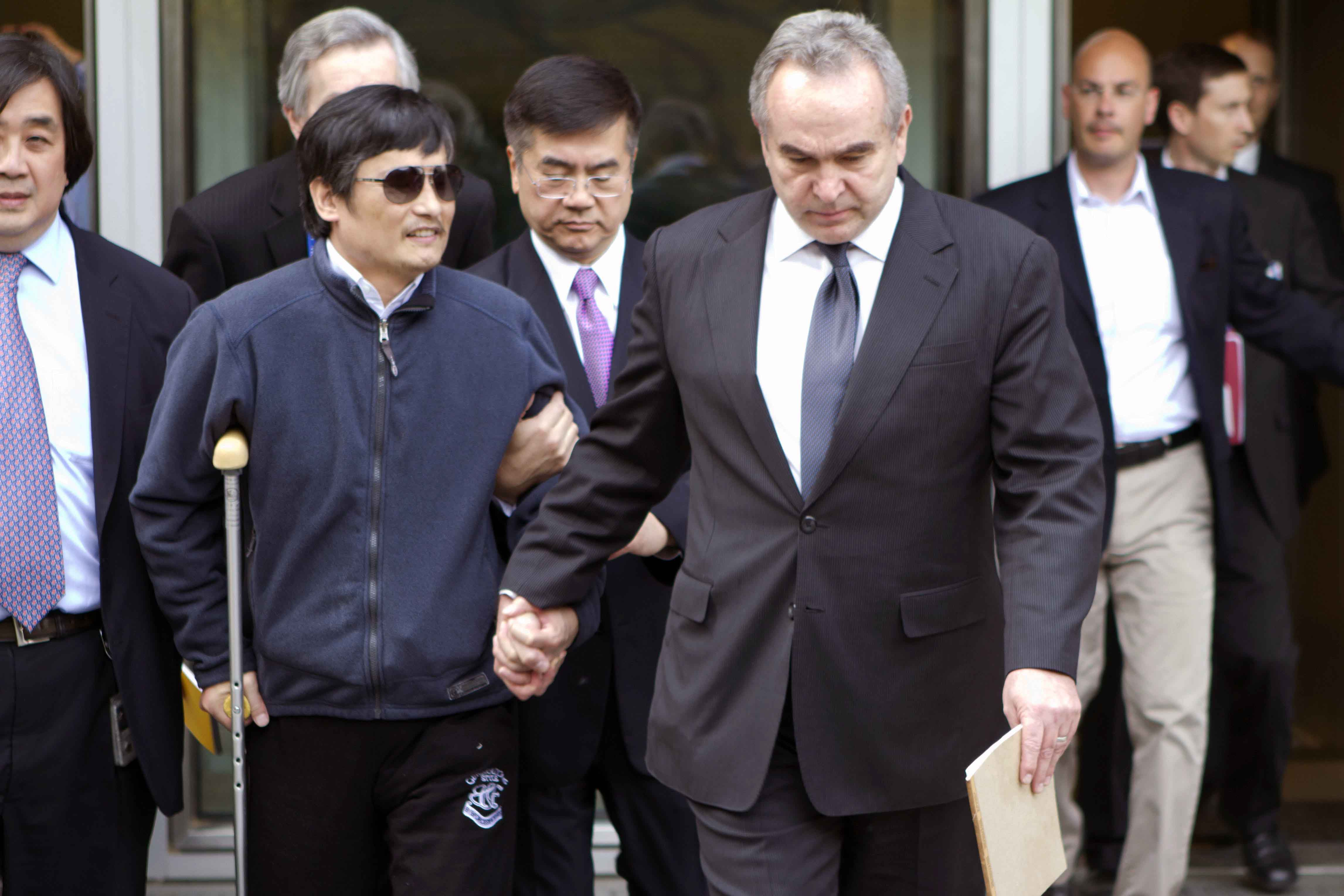
Chen Guangcheng (left) with Locke (center) and Kurt M. Campbell (right) at the U.S. Embassy in Beijing on May 1, 2012

Following the resignation of Jon Huntsman Jr., Obama nominated Locke to serve as United States Ambassador to China. The Senate confirmed Locke unanimously on July 27, 2011; Locke resigned as Secretary of Commerce on August 1.

A photo of Locke carrying his own knapsack and ordering his own coffee at the Seattle–Tacoma International Airport went viral in China on the Sina Weibo social network, with many commentators approving of his humble, low-key style. At his first news conference after arrival in Beijing, Locke pledged to promote bilateral cooperation and understanding between the two countries.

Early in Locke's ambassadorship, Chinese dissident Chen Guangcheng escaped from house arrest and sought refuge in the U.S. Embassy in Beijing in April 2012. On May 2, China's Ministry of Foreign Affairs demanded an apology from the U.S. for its role in the incident. In an editorial on May 4, Beijing Daily questioned Locke's motives by taking Chen in, describing Chen as "a tool and a pawn for American politicians to blacken China."

In late November 2013, Locke announced that he would step down as ambassador to spend more time with his family in Seattle. In an analysis of his ambassadorship, Sun Zhe, a professor at Tsinghua University in Beijing, said, "It is not an easy job to be the American ambassador to China. Gary Locke is not a shining star, but a simple and unadorned ambassador." Shen Dingli, dean of the international studies department at Fudan University in Shanghai, largely concurred, commenting that Locke "showed us how a U.S. minister-level official behaves by taking economy-class flights" but "caused a twist" when he allowed Chen refuge in the U.S. embassy. Max Baucus, a former United States Senator from Montana, was Obama's nominee to replace Locke and was confirmed by the Senate 96–0; Vice President Joe Biden administered the oath of office on February 21, 2014.

== Post-ambassadorship career ==
On February 17, 2016, Locke joined the board of AMC Theatres. After dumping more than $1.7 million in AMC stock in June 2021, Locke was a named party in a shareholder lawsuit against the board in August 2023.

On May 31, 2016, Locke joined the board of the Seattle-based global health nonprofit PATH.

Locke has been a major proponent of affirmative action in Washington State. He publicly endorsed I-1000 in the 2019 Washington State general election. Those efforts were overturned by a majority of voters in the state of Washington in 2019.

In 2020, an ad for the reelection of president Donald Trump portrayed Locke with Joe Biden and falsely suggested he was an official of the Chinese Communist Party.

Locke was tapped to be the interim president of Bellevue College on May 28, 2020, following the resignation of the college's president due to a controversial defacement of a campus mural. He assumed the acting post on June 15, 2020. On March 29, 2023, it was announced that David May would become permanent president. May took office on July 1, 2023.

In January 2021, Locke was elected to chair the Committee of 100.

In March 2021, local media speculated that Locke could run for Mayor of Seattle in the 2021 election. Commentators noted that this was unlikely, as he resided in Bellevue, Washington, outside of Seattle city limits. Locke chose not to run, instead endorsing the campaign of Bruce Harrell, who was elected.

On November 16, 2023, Locke joined Dorsey & Whitney as a senior advisor.

== Personal life ==
Locke's first marriage, to a law school classmate, ended with a divorce in the 1970s. On October 15, 1994, Locke married Mona Lee, a television reporter for the NBC affiliate KING 5 television in Seattle and former Miss Asian America 15 years his junior. They divorced in 2015. The Lockes have three children: Emily Nicole (b. March 1997), Dylan James (b. March 1999), and Madeline Lee (b. November 2004). He is a Protestant.

Regarding his ethnicity and being the only person of Chinese descent to have served as an ambassador to China, he said, "I'm proud of my Chinese heritage. I'm proud of the great contributions that China has made to world civilization over thousands of years. But I'm thoroughly American. I'm proud of the great values that America has brought to the entire world and all that America stands for."

== Political views ==
When asked if there is place for Asian Americans in politics, Locke had this to say:

"I think our native cultures have emphasized respect for our elders, care of our elders, but also focusing on education. But my overall response is that Asian Americans are part and parcel of the great success of America. Our grandparents came over in the 1800s to work in the railroads, work the lumber camps, goldmines, worked in the canneries, farmland that most people thought could never raise a crop, worked as merchants in cities that were just emerging. They fought in world wars, died for our freedoms and our liberties. Asian Americans have given our blood, sweat and tears to the communities and to this country. There's a prosperity that we on the west coast enjoy. So much of the prosperity and progress of the western states is because of the blood, sweat and tears of Asian Americans. From doing the dirty work to fighting in our world wars and contributing to our society now as doctors, researchers, people in high tech, as innovators, in all different professions. We have every right, indeed a responsibility, to help set the policies that will move our communities and our nation forward."

== See also ==
- History of Chinese Americans in Seattle
- List of minority governors and lieutenant governors in the United States

Political offices
Preceded by Tim Hill	Executive of King County; 1994–1997	Succeeded by Ron Sims
Preceded by Mike Lowry	Governor of Washington; 1997–2005	Succeeded by Christine Gregoire
Preceded by Carlos Gutierrez	United States Secretary of Commerce; 2009–2011	Succeeded by John Bryson
Party political offices
Preceded by Mike Lowry	Democratic nominee for Governor of Washington; 1996, 2000	Succeeded by Christine Gregoire
Preceded by Parris Glendening	Chair of the Democratic Governors Association; 2002–2003	Succeeded by Tom Vilsack
Preceded by Dick Gephardt	Response to the State of the Union address 2003	Succeeded by Tom Daschle; Nancy Pelosi
Diplomatic posts
Preceded by Jon Huntsman	United States Ambassador to China; 2011–2014	Succeeded by Max Baucus
U.S. order of precedence (ceremonial)
Preceded by Hilda Solis as Former U.S. Cabinet Member	Order of precedence of the United States as Former U.S. Cabinet Member	Succeeded by Kathleen Sebelius as Former U.S. Cabinet Member
