= Senator Tanner =

Senator Tanner may refer to:

- Gloria Tanner (1935–2022), Colorado State Senate
- Joe Tanner (Washington politician) (fl. 1980s), Washington State Senate
- John Riley Tanner (1844–1901), Illinois State Senate
- William Elam Tanner (1836–1896), Virginia State Senate
