= Trashing the Planet =

1990 book by Dixy Lee Ray

- Title page for Trashing the Planet: How Science Can Help Us Deal With Acid Rain, Depletion of the Ozone, and Nuclear Waste (Among Other Things) (1992 edition)
- Author: Dixy Lee Ray
- Publisher: Regnery Gateway
- Publication date: 1990
- Pages: 206
- ISBN: 9780895265449

Trashing the Planet: How Science Can Help Us Deal With Acid Rain, Depletion of the Ozone, and Nuclear Waste (Among Other Things) is a 1990 book by zoologist and Governor of Washington Dixy Lee Ray. The book talks about the seriousness about acid rain, the problems with the ozone layer and other environmental issues. Ray co-wrote the book with journalist Lou Guzzo.

== See also ==
- The Story of Stuff
