= 1984 Washington gubernatorial election =

- November 6, 1984
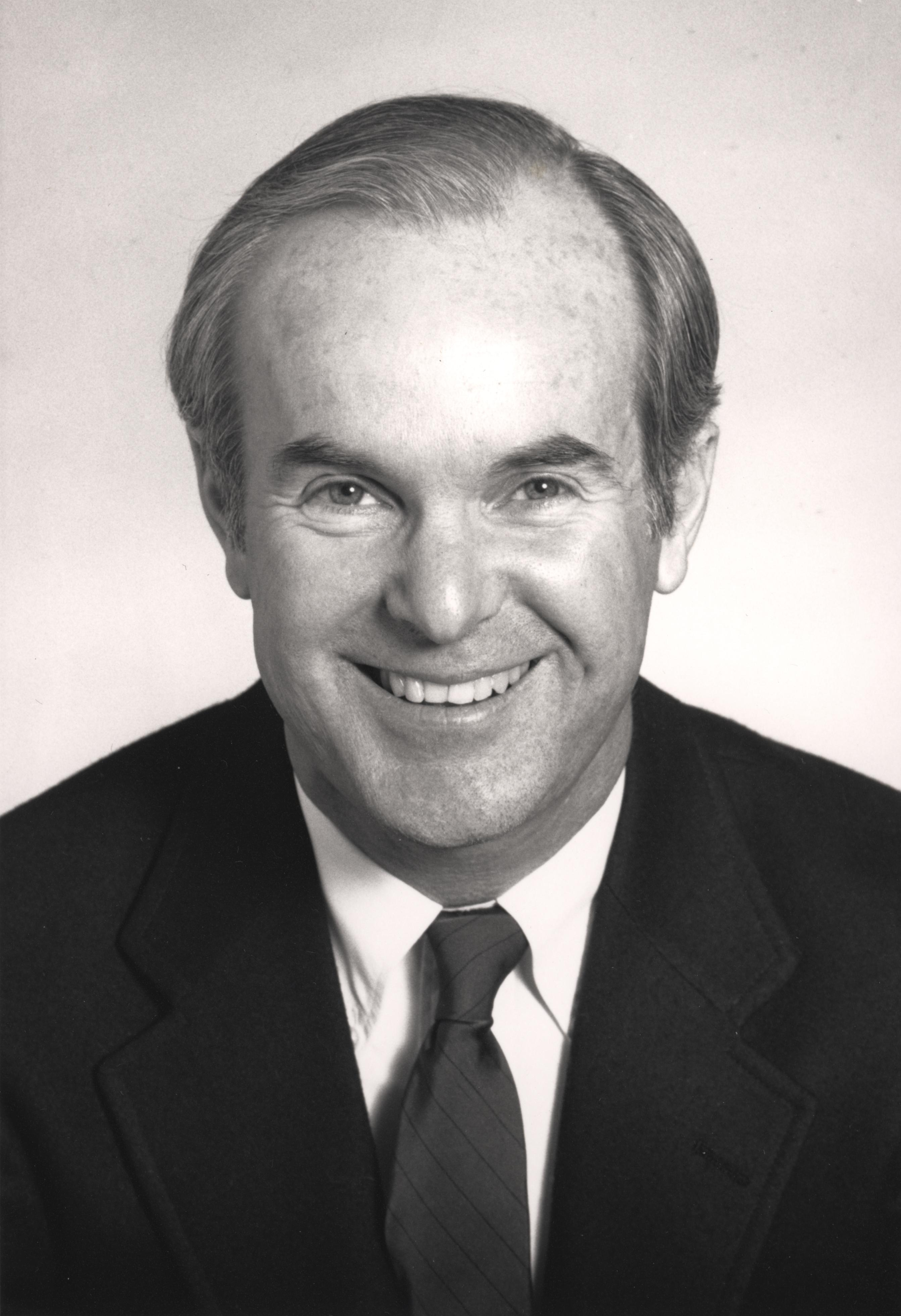

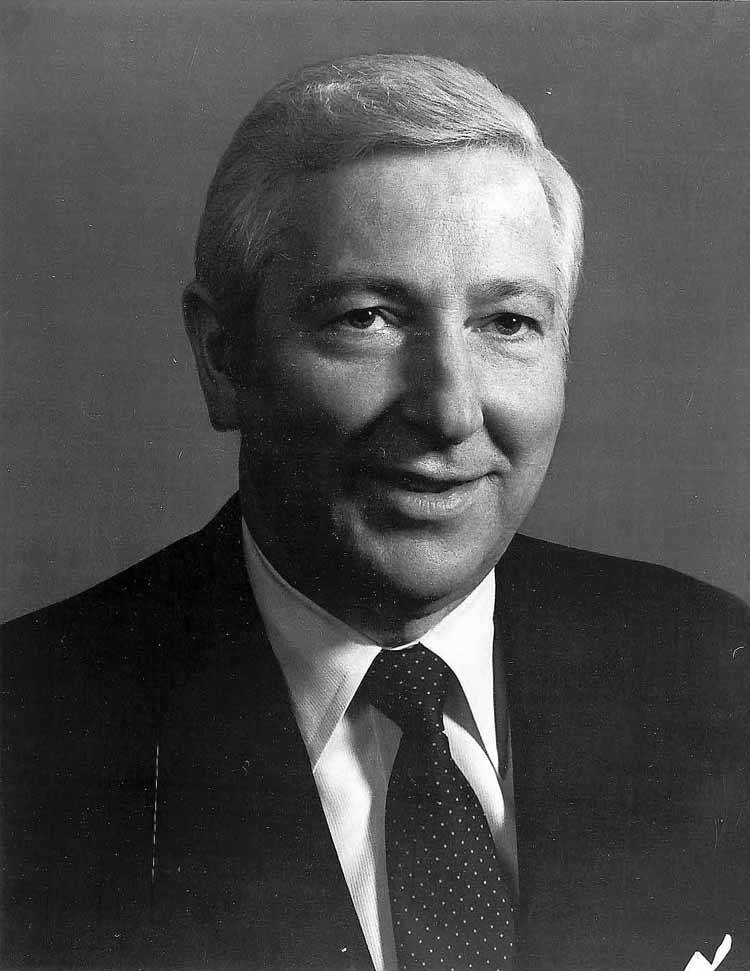
Nominee	Booth Gardner	John Spellman
Party	Democratic	Republican
Popular vote	1,006,993	881,994
Percentage	53.31%	46.69%
- County results Gardner: 50–60% 60–70% 70–80% Spellman: 50–60%
Governor before election
John Spellman
Republican
Elected Governor
Booth Gardner
Democratic

The 1984 Washington gubernatorial election was held on November 6, 1984. Incumbent Republican John Spellman ran for re-election to a second term and was defeated by Democrat Booth Gardner despite Republican President Ronald Reagan carrying the state by 13 points in the concurrent presidential election. As of 2026, this is the last time that the Washington governor's office changed partisan control or that an incumbent governor of Washington was defeated.

== Primary election ==
=== Candidates ===
==== Republican ====
- John Spellman, incumbent governor of Washington
- Ted Parker Fix

==== Democratic ====
- Booth Gardner, Pierce County Executive
- Jim McDermott, psychiatrist, state senator, candidate for governor in 1972, and nominee for governor 1980
- John Jovanovich, state representative

==== Third-party ====
- Mark A. Calney (Independent), author
- Bob LeRoy (Populist)
- Cheryll Y. Hidalgo (Socialist Workers)

=== Results ===
Results by county Gardner: 30–40%; 40–50%; 50–60%; Spellman: 30–40%; 40–50%; McDermott: 30–40%

Blanket primary results
Party	Candidate	Votes	%
Democratic	Booth Gardner	421,087	46.07%
Republican	John Spellman (incumbent)	239,463	26.20%
Democratic	Jim McDermott	209,435	22.91%
Democratic	John Jovanovich	23,699	2.59%
Republican	Ted Parker Fix	11,193	1.23%
Populist	Bob LeRoy	3,601	0.39%
Independent	Mark A. Calney	2,851	0.31%
Socialist Workers	Cheryll Y. Hidalgo	2,672	0.29%
Total votes		914,001	100.00%

== General election ==
=== Candidates ===
- John Spellman (R), incumbent governor of Washington
- Booth Gardner (D), Pierce County Executive

=== Results ===
1984 Washington gubernatorial election
Party	Candidate	Votes	%	±%
Democratic	Booth Gardner	1,006,993	53.31%	+9.99%
Republican	John Spellman (incumbent)	881,994	46.69%	−9.99%
Total votes		1,888,987	100.00%	N/A
Democratic gain from Republican				

==== By county ====
Booth Gardner is the most recent Democrat to carry Lewis County and Stevens County in a gubernatorial election. Conversely, John Spellman is the last Republican to have won San Juan County.

County	John Spellman Republican		Booth Gardner Democratic		Margin		Total votes cast
County	#	%	#	%	#	%	Total votes cast
Adams	2,809	57.57%	2,070	42.43%	-739	-15.15%	4,879
Asotin	3,308	46.32%	3,833	53.68%	525	7.35%	7,141
Benton	26,236	55.56%	20,982	44.44%	-5,254	-11.13%	47,218
Chelan	11,960	57.49%	8,843	42.51%	-3,117	-14.98%	20,803
Clallam	11,820	49.30%	12,156	50.70%	336	1.40%	23,976
Clark	31,629	40.67%	46,144	59.33%	14,515	18.66%	77,773
Columbia	1,157	55.31%	935	44.69%	-222	-10.61%	2,092
Cowlitz	11,553	38.10%	18,770	61.90%	7,217	23.80%	30,323
Douglas	5,361	54.93%	4,398	45.07%	-963	-9.87%	9,759
Ferry	935	43.92%	1,194	56.08%	259	12.17%	2,129
Franklin	6,250	52.04%	5,761	47.96%	-489	-4.07%	12,011
Garfield	736	51.79%	685	48.21%	-51	-3.59%	1,421
Grant	10,238	53.45%	8,917	46.55%	-1,321	6.90%	19,155
Grays Harbor	7,761	29.27%	18,752	70.73%	10,991	41.46%	26,513
Island	11,664	56.01%	9,160	43.99%	-2,504	-12.02%	20,824
Jefferson	4,224	46.28%	4,904	53.72%	680	7.45%	9,128
King	306,605	47.65%	336,878	52.35%	30,273	4.70%	643,483
Kitsap	29,835	44.33%	37,460	55.67%	7,625	11.33%	67,295
Kittitas	4,504	40.65%	6,577	59.35%	2,073	18.71%	11,081
Klickitat	2,910	43.39%	3,797	56.61%	887	13.22%	6,707
Lewis	9,969	41.92%	13,811	58.08%	3,842	16.16%	23,780
Lincoln	2,888	55.19%	2,345	44.81%	-543	-10.38%	5,233
Mason	6,528	41.20%	9,316	58.80%	2,788	17.60%	15,844
Okanogan	6,802	51.69%	6,357	48.31%	-445	-3.38%	13,159
Pacific	2,955	35.06%	5,473	64.94%	2,518	29.88%	8,428
Pend Oreille	1,766	43.45%	2,298	56.55%	532	13.09%	4,064
Pierce	79,246	41.26%	112,796	58.74%	33,550	17.47%	192,042
San Juan	2,799	51.52%	2,634	48.48%	-165	-3.04%	5,433
Skagit	15,130	45.05%	18,457	54.95%	3,327	9.91%	33,587
Skamania	1,376	41.57%	1,934	58.43%	558	16.86%	3,310
Snohomish	75,823	47.34%	84,328	52.66%	8,505	5.31%	160,151
Spokane	76,502	50.75%	74,244	49.25%	-2,258	-1.50%	150,746
Stevens	6,428	49.98%	6,433	50.02%	5	0.04%	12,861
Thurston	26,950	43.15%	35,501	56.85%	8,551	13.69%	62,451
Wahkiakum	619	36.48%	1,078	63.52%	459	27.05%	1,697
Walla Walla	11,106	56.72%	8,473	43.28%	-2,633	-13.45%	19,579
Whatcom	20,255	39.89%	30,525	60.11%	10,270	20.22%	50,780
Whitman	9,246	55.17%	7,512	44.83%	-1,734	-10.35%	16,758
Yakima	34,111	52.18%	31,262	47.82%	-2,849	-4.36%	65,373
Totals	881,994	46.69%	1,006,993	53.31%	124,999	6.62%	1,888,987

==== Counties that flipped from Republican to Democratic ====
- Asotin
- Clallam
- Clark
- Cowlitz
- King
- Kitsap
- Kittitas
- Lewis
- Mason
- Pend Oreille
- Pierce
- Skagit
- Snohomish
- Stevens
- Thurston
- Whatcom
