= Dixy Lee Ray =

American politician (1914–1994)

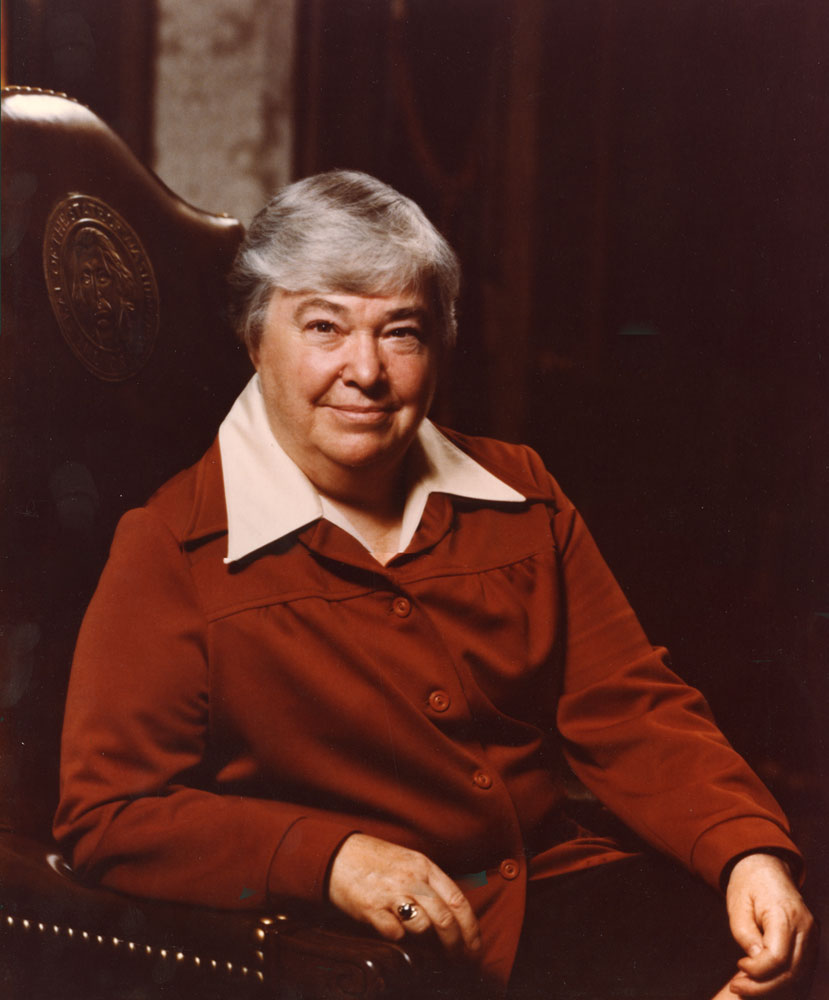

17th Governor of Washington
- In office January 12, 1977 – January 14, 1981
- Lieutenant: John Cherberg
- Preceded by: Daniel J. Evans
- Succeeded by: John Spellman

1st Assistant Secretary of State for Oceans and International Environmental and Scientific Affairs
- In office January 19, 1975 – June 20, 1975
- President: Gerald Ford
- Preceded by: Position established
- Succeeded by: Frederick Irving

Chair of the Atomic Energy Commission
- In office February 6, 1973 – January 18, 1975
- President: Richard Nixon; Gerald Ford
- Preceded by: James Schlesinger
- Succeeded by: Robert Seamans (Energy Research and Development Administration)

Personal details
- Born: Marguerite Ray; September 3, 1914 Tacoma, Washington, U.S.
- Died: January 2, 1994 (aged 79) Fox Island, Washington, U.S.
- Party: Democratic
- Education: Mills College (BS, MS); Stanford University (PhD)

Dixy Lee Ray (born Marguerite Ray, September 3, 1914 – January 2, 1994) was an American academic, zoologist, scientist, and politician who served as the 17th governor of Washington from 1977 to 1981. She was the state's first female governor and was in office during the 1980 eruption of Mount St. Helens.

A graduate of Mills College and Stanford University, where she earned a doctorate in biology, Ray became an associate professor at the University of Washington in 1957. She was chief scientist aboard the schooner SS Te Vega during the International Indian Ocean Expedition. Under her guidance, the nearly bankrupt Pacific Science Center was transformed from a traditional, exhibit-oriented museum to an interactive learning center, and returned to solvency.

In 1973, Ray was appointed chairman of the United States Atomic Energy Commission (AEC) by President Richard Nixon. Under her leadership, research and development were separated from safety programs, and Milton Shaw, the head of the powerful reactor development division, was removed. She was appointed Assistant Secretary of State for Oceans and International Environmental and Scientific Affairs by President Gerald Ford in 1975, but resigned six months later, complaining about lack of input into department decision making.

Ray ran for election as Governor of Washington as a Democrat in 1976. She won the election despite her blunt, sometimes confrontational, style. As governor, she approved allowing supertankers to dock in Puget Sound, championed support for unrestrained growth and development, and continued to express enthusiasm for atomic energy. On April 3, 1980, she declared a state of emergency as a result of the volcanic eruption of Mount St. Helens. She retired after losing her re-election bid for the Democratic nomination later that year.

== Early life and education ==
Ray was born Marguerite Ray in Tacoma, Washington, to Frances Adams Ray and Alvis Marion Ray, the second in a family of five girls. She joined the Girl Scouts and, at the age of 12, became the youngest girl, up to that time, to summit Mount Rainier. In 1930, at age 16, she legally changed her name to "Dixy Lee"; as a child she had been referred to by family members as "little Dickens" (an idiom for "devil") and Dixy was a shortened form of the nickname. She chose "Lee" because of a family connection to Robert E. Lee.

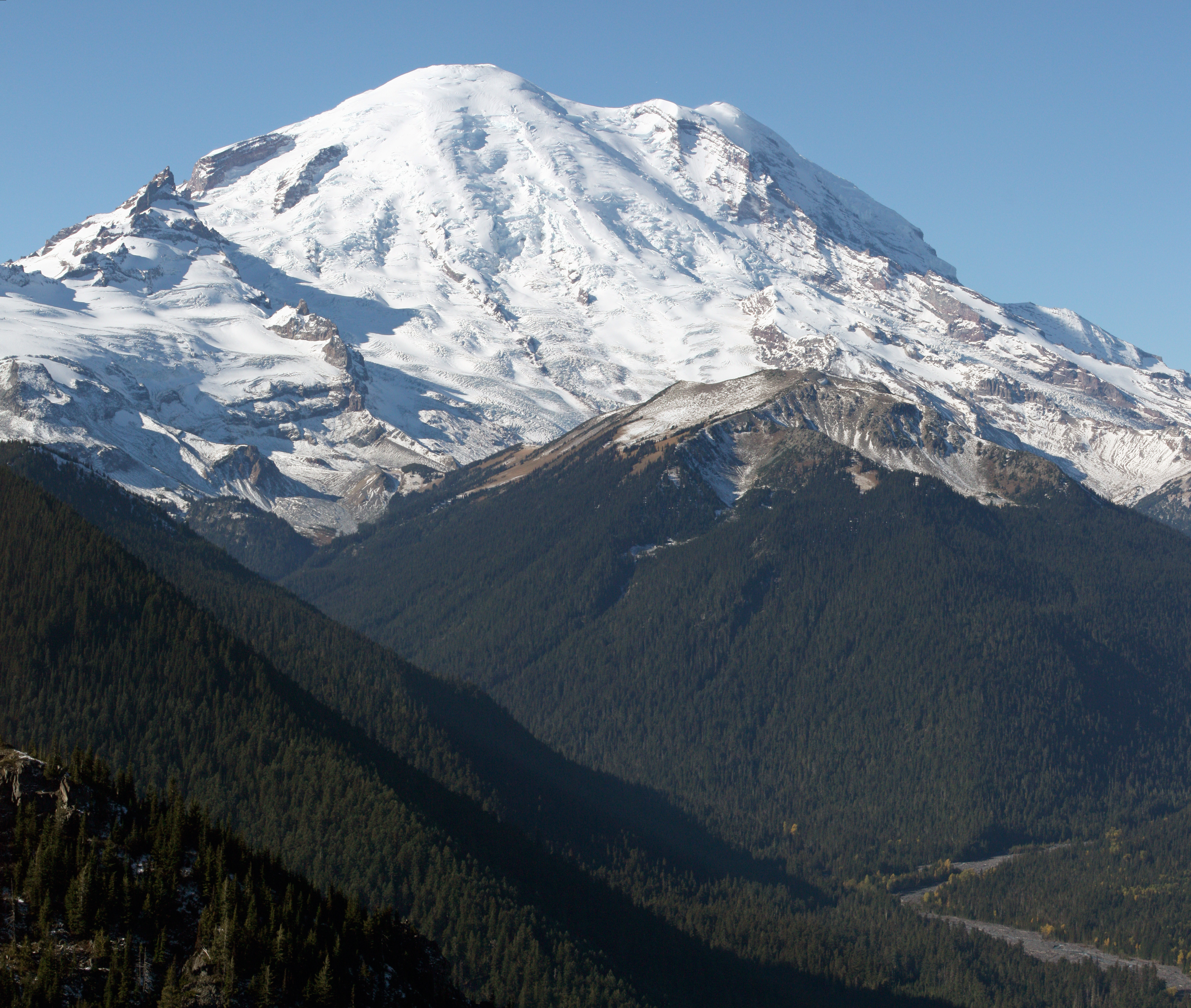
At the age of 12, Ray became the youngest girl to summit Mount Rainier.

Ray attended Tacoma's Stadium High School and graduated as valedictorian from Mills College in Oakland, California, in 1937, working her way through school as a waitress and janitor. She went on to earn a master's degree in 1938. Her thesis was titled A Comparative Study of the Life Habits of Some Species of Burrowing Eumalacostraca. Ray spent the next four years teaching science in the Oakland Unified School District. In 1942, a John Switzer Fellowship allowed her to enter a doctoral program in biology at Stanford University. Ray's dissertation was The peripheral nervous system of Lampanyctus leucopsarus, a lanternfish. She completed the research for her dissertation in 1945 at the Hopkins Marine Station in Pacific Grove, California. She is known to have lived a rather unconventional lifestyle, living in a house trailer with her two dogs, and therefore contributing a diverse perspective to the Washington bureaucracy.

== Scientific career ==
=== University of Washington ===
In 1945, Ray returned to Washington to accept a position as an instructor in the zoology department at the University of Washington. She was promoted to assistant professor in 1947 and, five years later, received a prestigious John Simon Guggenheim Memorial Foundation fellowship grant, which she used to undertake six months of postdoctoral research at Caltech. In 1957, she was made an associate professor at the University of Washington. During her time there, she also served as chief scientist aboard the schooner SS Te Vega during the International Indian Ocean Expedition. Her reputation in the classroom swung between wild extremes; students either "loved her or loathed her", as did faculty members. One fellow professor reportedly described her as "an intemperate, feeble-minded old bitch".

=== KCTS-TV and Pacific Science Center ===
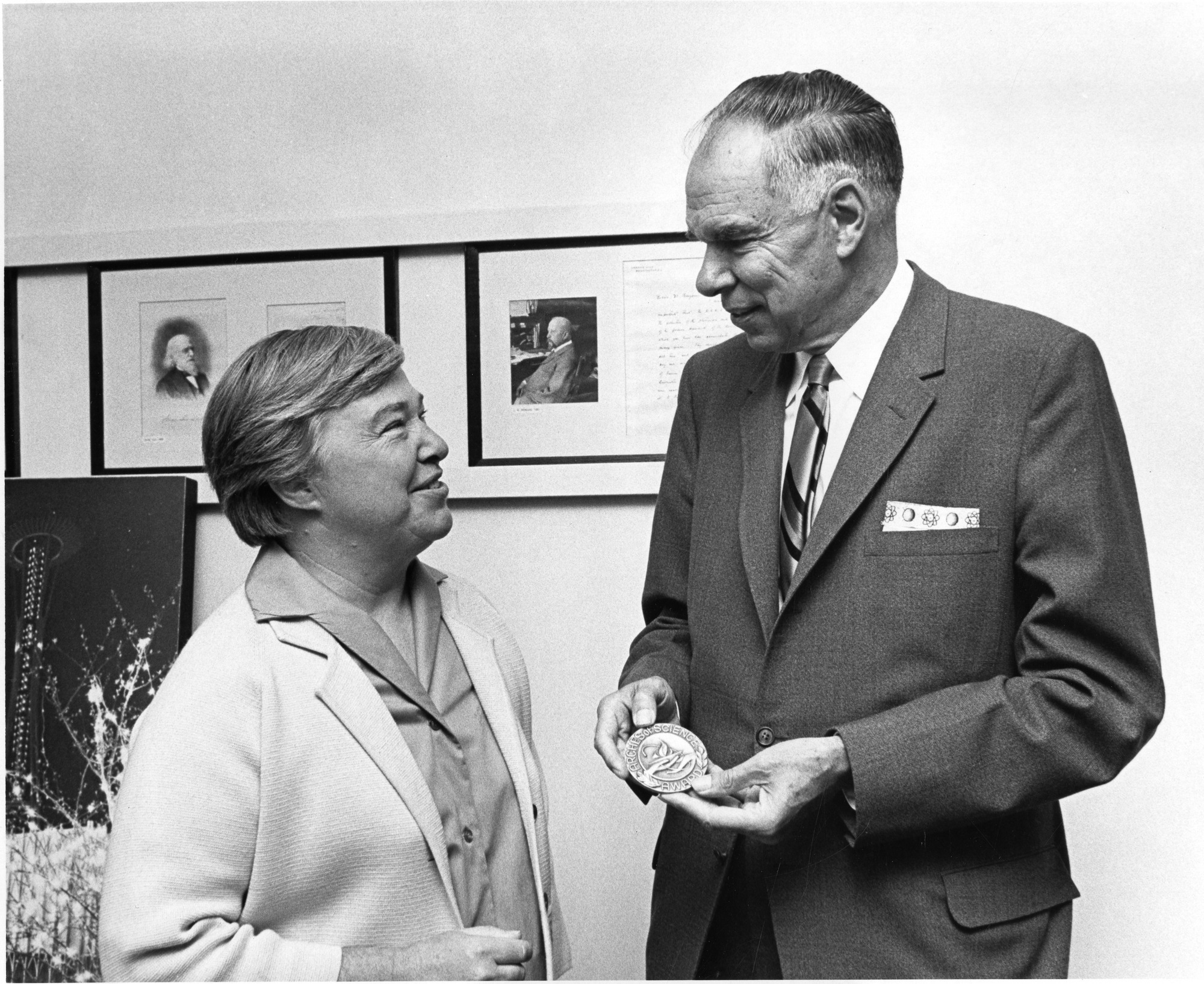
Dixy Lee Ray presents the Pacific Science Center's "Arches of Science" award to Nobel Laureate Glenn Seaborg in 1968. At the time Seaborg was Chair of the U.S. Atomic Energy Commission, a position Ray would hold several years later.

Intrigued by her reputation as a person who could "make science interesting," producers at KCTS-TV, Seattle's PBS member station, approached Ray about hosting a weekly television program on marine biology. The show, Animals of the Seashore, was a hit and helped propel her into the public eye beyond campus. Her growing popularity led the Pacific Science Center to invite Ray to take over the nearly-bankrupt science museum for an annual salary of $20,000. Ray jumped at the opportunity and immediately began a top-to-bottom overhaul of the center, declaring "I'll be damned if I'm going to become a landlady to a hoary old museum." Under Ray's guidance, the Pacific Science Center was converted from a traditional, exhibit-oriented museum to an interactive learning center.

Ray's hands-on approach to running the Pacific Science Center reflected at every level. She kept a police whistle in her desk that she would use to run off loitering hippies. Jim Anderson, who would eventually teach fisheries science at the University of Washington, recalled a typical encounter with Ray, for whom he worked at the Pacific Science Center in 1968:

Her driving was infamous and my one ride with her, in a three-quarter-ton flatbed truck, was wholly memorable. Admittedly, it was an early Sunday morning, but sliding through stop signs, a few crosswise, was disconcerting at best. The ride went over the top when we reached the Science Center. The lot was full of cars without permits. Trying to fit in a very small space with a large flatbed truck, she dented two cars, broke the taillight off a third, and finally vaporized the rear window of a fourth.

Ray led the Pacific Science Center back into financial solvency. Her aggressive fundraising for the center also helped introduce her to many of the city's most influential citizens, including Senator Warren Magnuson.

== Government ==
=== Atomic Energy Commission ===
An advocate of nuclear power, in 1973 Ray was appointed by Richard Nixon to chair the U.S. Atomic Energy Commission (AEC) on the recommendation of Senator Warren Magnuson. The offer of appointment came via a telephone call after she was paged in an airport. After being told she would have to relocate to Washington, D.C., Ray declined the offer, saying "I'm living where I like to live." Nonetheless, she ultimately relented after being persuaded by her longtime friend Lou Guzzo.

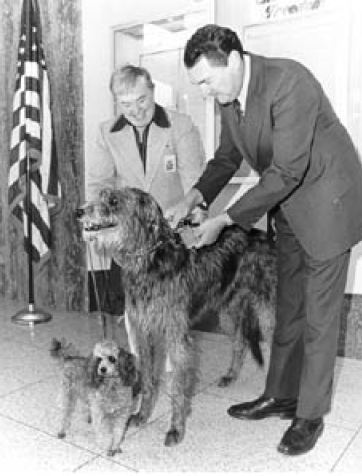
Ray and her dogs Ghillie and Jacques inspect the Hanford nuclear reservation. With them is Thomas Nemzek, at the time Director of Reactor R&D.

Following her appointment to the commission, news of her personal eccentricities began to emerge after reporters discovered she was living out of a 28-foot motor home, which was parked on a lot in rural Virginia. Each morning she was chauffeured from her RV to the AEC offices in Germantown, Maryland, accompanied by her 100-pound (45 kg) Scottish Deerhound Ghillie and a Miniature Poodle named Jacques. Media reports commented on her unusual hosiery (white knee socks).

Her personal quirks were widely perceived as a weakness by tenured bureaucrats. A profile by Graham Chedd in New Scientist explained that,

Almost everyone found the eccentricities delightful, and preserved their macho with speculations of the mincemeat that would be made of her by such AEC "heavies" as Milton Shaw, head of the powerful division of reactor development, and Chet Holifield, the iron man of the congressional joint committee on atomic energy.

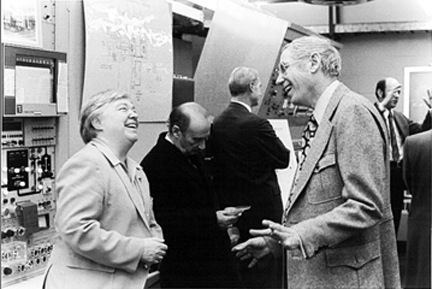
Ray speaking with Robert Sachs, director of the Argonne National Laboratory, c. 1974

However, less than a year after taking over, Ray had forced Shaw out, ordering that research and development be separated from safety programs as some environmental groups had demanded. In addition to its research responsibilities, the AEC was charged with the manufacture of nuclear weapons for the U.S. military. Ray would later fondly recall the first time she saw a nuclear warhead, describing it "like a piece of beautiful sculpture, a work of the highest level of technological skill."

Ray served as commission chair until the AEC was abolished in 1975,

=== U.S. State Department ===
In 1975, Ray was appointed Assistant Secretary of State for Oceans and International Environmental and Scientific Affairs by Gerald Ford, but resigned five months later, complaining about lack of input into department decision making. She subsequently told a United States Senate committee that she "saw Secretary of State Henry Kissinger only once – the day she was sworn in as an assistant secretary of state." In a parting shot as she left D.C., Ray declared that "anything the private sector can do, the government can do it worse."

== Governor of Washington (1977–1981) ==
=== Campaign and election ===
To the surprise of many, Ray announced in 1975 she would seek election as Governor of Washington. Later asked why she decided to make her first run for public office the highest office in the state, she would reason, "I was much too old to start at the bottom, so I decided to start at the top." Though previously politically unaffiliated, she declared herself a Democrat.

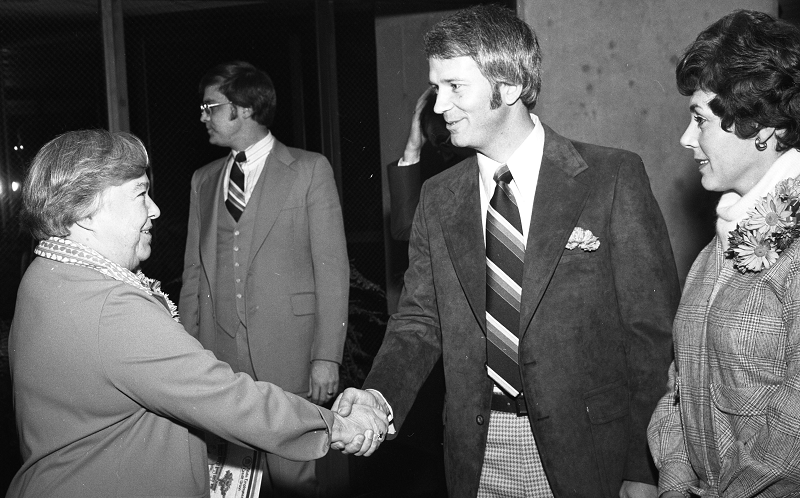
Governor Ray at Washington State Employees Credit Union open house in 1977

Ray displayed a blunt, sometimes confrontational, style on the campaign trail, for which she would later become known. During a visit with the Dorian Society, a Seattle gay rights group, she was asked by one member if she had met any gay federal employees and if they ever felt under pressure. Ray responded, "I don't know any – you can't tell by looking at them," drawing applause from attendees. In another instance, she declared Seattle Post-Intelligencer reporter Shelby Scates, who had deluged her with tough questions on the campaign trail, would "learn what the words persona non grata really mean" after her election.

Ray narrowly won the Democratic nomination over Seattle mayor Wes Uhlman, having spent almost no money on her campaign, having no experience in running for elected office, and having little support from the state's political class. Despite opposition from all major newspapers and predictions from pundits that the state was not ready "for an unmarried woman who gave herself a chainsaw for Christmas," Ray went on to win the general election with a victory over King County Executive John D. Spellman, 53%–44%. On election night, asked by a reporter to explain her surprise victory, she offered, "it can't be because I'm so pretty?"

After assuming office, Ray tightened Washington state spending and began an audit of state salaries and programs. She balanced the state budget and during her tenure as Governor oversaw the state's first full funding for basic public education. As the first resident of the Governor's Mansion without a First Lady, Ray hired her elder sister Marion R. Reid to serve as her official hostess.

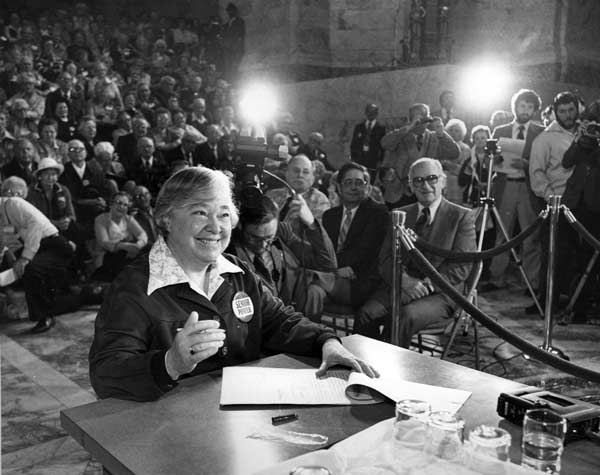
Dixy Lee Ray signing a bill into law in the rotunda of the Legislative Building in Olympia

Nonetheless, she quickly alienated fellow Democrats with her conservative views on energy and the environment. She approved allowing supertankers to dock in Puget Sound, championed support for unrestrained growth and development, and continued to express enthusiasm for atomic power. She likewise alienated the state's Republican establishment after she fired 124 appointees of her predecessor, three-term governor Daniel J. Evans, offering to send them "a box of kleenex with their pink slips." She filled their places with old colleagues, described by some as "yes men." Her treatment of the media was similarly dismissive. Local television reporter Paul Boyd once interviewed the governor while she was dressed in "a ratty Ban-lon sports shirt, sweat pants covered with dog hair, red socks, and tennis shoes."

Ray's uncompromising belief in the correctness of her views occasionally spilled over state lines. During what was supposed to be a routine joint press conference in Boise, Idaho, by the governors of Washington, Oregon, and Idaho in which the three touted the benefits of energy conservation, Ray reacted with barely concealed disdain to Oregon governor Robert W. Straub's call for legislation to encourage the installation of home insulation. "I don't believe our citizens are lax, or lazy, or indifferent," Ray fired. "In Washington we have a strong voluntary energy conservation program. We don't need legislative incentives."

Back in Washington, Ray sometimes engaged in elaborate ceremony; on her inauguration she hosted not just one but nine inaugural balls. To promulgate House Bill 491, a relatively minor $13 million appropriations measure, she had nearly 1,000 people assembled in the rotunda of the Legislative Building (the Associated Press noted, at the time, that it was ordinarily "unusual for more than a dozen people to show up" to bill signings, which would customarily be held in the governor's office).

Press and political opposition solidified in the face of her unyielding style of governance. In a critical 1977 article in Mother Jones, Ray Mungo labeled Ray as a "slightly wacky Miss Marple" and described the increasingly madcap atmosphere in Washington:

For the first time in the four years that I've lived in Seattle, the political climate is volatile, exciting, terrifying. Each day's newspapers bring fresh atrocities from Olympia, the state capital. The opposition is mounting with volcanic pressure, and the press is almost universally merciless with Dixy. But she plows forward with a stamina that could belong only to someone who, when not living in the governor's mansion, lives on an island, in a mobile home, with five dogs.

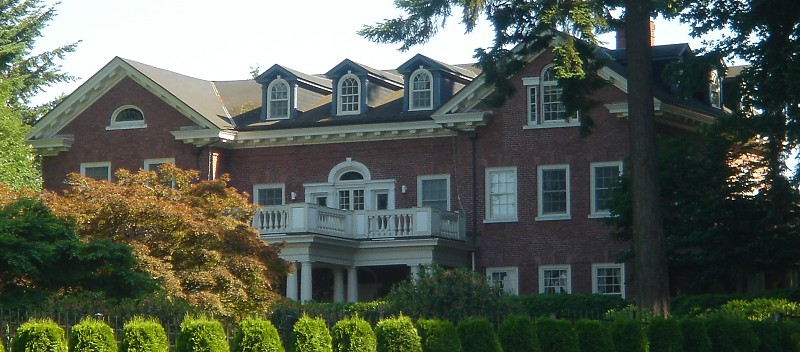
While Washington's chief executive, Ray split her time between the Governor's Mansion (pictured) and a trailer on rural Fox Island.

Ralph Nader, during a visit to the state, called Ray's administration "gubernatorial lunacy." Ray's own campaign manager, Blair Butterworth, vaguely quipped, "we thought she would be the best governor Washington ever had, or the worst, and we were right." Support from her fellow scientists, however, was often positive; Edward Teller called Ray "a very wonderful lady" and said he would support her if she ran for President of the United States in the 1980 election.

=== State of emergency ===
On April 3, 1980, Ray declared a state of emergency as a result of the worsening threat of volcanic eruption posed by Mount St. Helens. Warning that "the possibility of a major eruption or mudflow is real," she urged a sometimes skeptical public to stay away from the mountain.

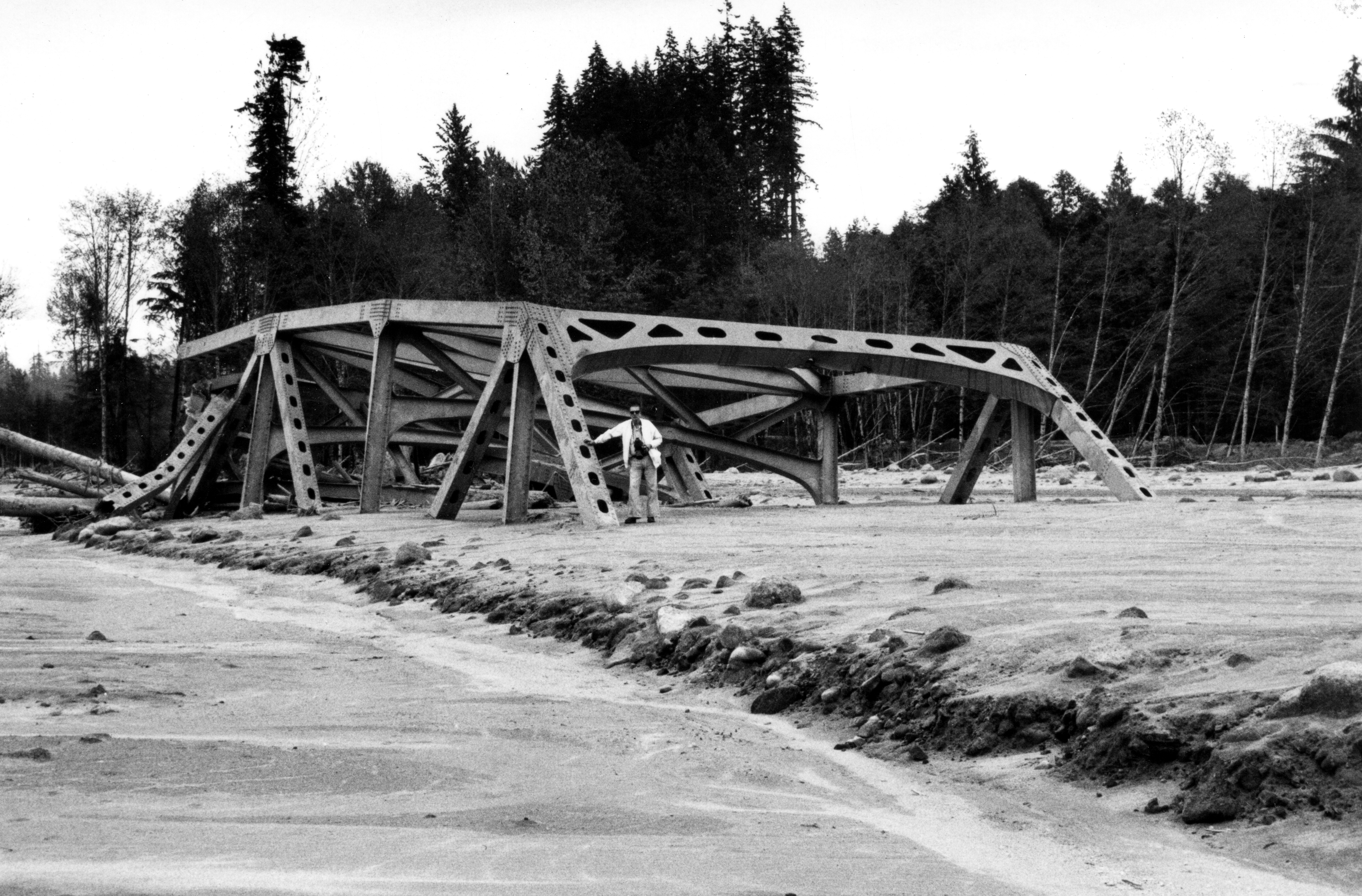
A bridge carrying State Route 504 lies in ruins after being carried by a lahar generated by the 1980 eruption of Mount St. Helens.

The emergency decree was followed, on April 30, by the declaration of a "red zone" in southwestern Washington where public access would be banned and relocation of the population would be compelled by state troops, if necessary. Ray ordered the Washington National Guard mobilized and the deployment of the Washington State Patrol to reinforce the sheriffs of Cowlitz County and Skamania County in carrying out her declaration, with violation punishable by six months imprisonment. The U.S. Forest Service later credited the red zone restrictions with saving 5,000 to 30,000 people from certain death. At the same time, however, Ray was criticized for establishing a parallel "blue zone" where the public was generally banned, but Weyerhaeuser loggers were permitted. (When the mountain finally erupted, 11 of those killed were loggers operating in the blue zone. A subsequent lawsuit by families of the deceased, alleging negligence against the state, would be summarily dismissed in court for lack of evidence.) After the eruption, Ray would falsely claim that all killed were near the mountain illegally while it was found all but one individual was allowed to be there. On the day of the eruption a request to expand the blue zone sat on Ray's desk unsigned.

As a scientist, Ray was fascinated by the possibility of an eruption. In the weeks leading up to the fateful event, Ray flew to the mountain in the governor's plane, circling the peak and remarking, "I've always said I wanted to live long enough to see one of our volcanoes erupt." The cataclysmic eruption of the mountain, which occurred on May 18, 1980, killed 57 people. The level of devastation caused by the ensuing ash cloud, earthquakes, electrical storms, and flooding was unprecedented and, the following day, Ray invoked her emergency powers to postpone local elections, which had been scheduled for May 20.

Ray ran for reelection in 1980, enlisting Republican consultant Montgomery Johnson to head her campaign after her former manager, Butterworth, had defected to her rival, then-State Senator Jim McDermott. She lost to McDermott in a contentious Democratic primary election, 56%–41%, during which bumper stickers emblazoned with "Nixy on Dixy" and "Ditch the Bitch" became popular campaign tchotchkes. McDermott himself went on to lose in the general election to Republican John D. Spellman.

== Later life and death ==
=== After politics ===
External videos
- Booknotes interview with Ray on Trashing the Planet, June 16, 1991, C-SPAN

After leaving office, Ray retired to her farm on Fox Island. She was frequently in the news giving her opinion of current events. The Seattle Post-Intelligencer quoted her as saying she favored "abolishing political parties and taking away voting rights from anyone who fails to vote in two consecutive elections." Ray was known as a peculiar woman during the time she was in office, and as a result she was judged harshly. Yet at the same time, she opened new doors for women coming into politics in the 70s. During her retirement she co-authored two books with Lou Guzzo critical of the environmentalist movement. In one of those books, Trashing the Planet, she described environmentalists as "mostly white, middle to upper income and predominantly college educated ... they are distinguished by a vocal do-good mentality that sometimes cloaks a strong streak of elitism that is often coupled with a belief that the end justifies the means."

=== Death and legacy ===
Dixy Lee Ray died on January 2, 1994, at her home. Shortly before her death it was reported that she had had a bronchial infection, which led to the cause of her death, pneumonia. Later, controversy erupted after it emerged that employees of the Pierce County medical examiner's office had kept autopsy photos of Ray as souvenirs.

Ray's death was met with opinionated reflections on her life by her many friends and enemies. She was eulogized by her successor as governor, John Spellman, as "one of a kind." "She had a brilliant mind," Spellman said. "Her strength was as a teacher and a lecturer. She had this really bubbling personality. People weren't quite used to anybody that outspoken. But whatever she said, people still loved her."

Former state senator Gordon Walgren, who had been indicted on federal racketeering charges based on evidence collected by the State Patrol during Ray's term, recalled her in different tones. "I'm sure she made valuable contributions as an educator," Walgren noted. "I can't remember any as governor."

Ray's friend and a co-author in two of her books, Lou Guzzo, concluded that "she should have never gone into politics." "We thought it was time for someone in politics who tells the truth all the time," Guzzo recalled. "It didn't work."

In 2014, veteran Seattle journalist Knute Berger opined that Ray was ahead of her time. "It's interesting to note that many of her views are either mainstream or are creeping back into acceptability," Berger wrote.

After her death, the American Society of Mechanical Engineers (ASME) established an award in Dixy Lee Ray's honor for engineering contributions to the field of environmental protection. The award, which consists of a bronze medal with the governor's likeness and a cash grant, was first given to Clyde W. Frank in 1999 and has been made annually since.

Ray's papers, totaling 190 boxes of records and memorabilia spanning her career, are in deposit at the Hoover Institution Library and Archives at Stanford University.

=== Honors ===
- 1958: Clapp Award in Marine Biology
- 1973: Frances K. Hutchinson Medal for Service in Conservation
- 1973: United Nations Peace Medal
- 1974: Francis Boyer Science Award

Ray was the recipient of twenty honorary doctorates from U.S. and foreign universities.

=== Sexual orientation ===
The subject of Dixy Lee Ray's sexual orientation was carefully avoided in public discussion both during and after her life. While there were many rumors regarding her sexuality, the specific word "lesbian" was never used to describe her and many people have dismissed those rumors as speculation born of Ray's tomboy characteristics and unmarried status, rather than informed assessment.

== Electoral history ==
Governor of Washington Democratic primary – 1976
Party	Candidate	Votes	%
Democratic	Dixy Lee Ray	205,232	35.1
Democratic	Wes Uhlman	198,336	33.9
Democratic	Marvin Durning	136,290	23.3
Democratic	Duke Stockton	5,588	1.0

Governor of Washington general – 1976
Party	Candidate	Votes	%
Democratic	Dixy Lee Ray	821,797	53.14
Republican	John Spellman	689,039	44.43
American	Art Manning	12,406	0.80
OWL	Red Kelly	12,400	0.80
Socialist Labor	Henry Killman	4,137	0.27
Libertarian	Maurice W. Willey	4,133	0.27

Governor of Washington Democratic primary – 1980
Party	Candidate	Votes	%
Democratic	Jim McDermott	321,256	56.37
Democratic	Dixy Lee Ray (incumbent)	234,252	41.10
Democratic	Caroline (Hope) Diamond	4,184	0.73
Democratic	Robert L. Baldwin	3,578	0.63
Democratic	Lloyd G. Isley	2,723	0.48
Democratic	Douglas P. Bestle	2,481	0.44
Democratic	Jef Jaisun	1,476	0.26

== See also ==
- List of female governors in the United States

Government offices
Preceded by James Schlesinger	Chair of the Atomic Energy Commission; 1973–1975	Succeeded by Robert Seamans as Administrator of the Energy Research and Development Administration
New office	Assistant Secretary of State for Oceans and International Environmental and Scientific Affairs; 1975	Succeeded by Frederick Irving
Party political offices
Preceded by Albert Rosellini	Democratic nominee for Governor of Washington; 1976	Succeeded by Jim McDermott
Political offices
Preceded by Daniel Evans	Governor of Washington; 1977–1981	Succeeded by John Spellman
