= Joseph Tanner =

Joseph or Joe Tanner may refer to:

- Joseph M. Tanner (1859–1927), American educator and missionary and leader in the Church of Jesus Christ of Latter-day Saints
- Joseph R. Tanner (born 1950), American aviator and astronaut
- Joseph Robson Tanner (1860–1931), English historian
- Joe Tanner (baseball), American baseball player and coach
- Joe Tanner (Washington politician), member of the Washington House of Representatives
- Joe Tanner (Georgia politician)
