= 1976 Washington gubernatorial election =

- November 2, 1976
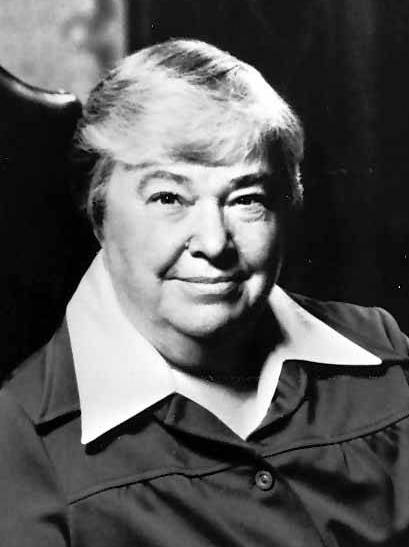

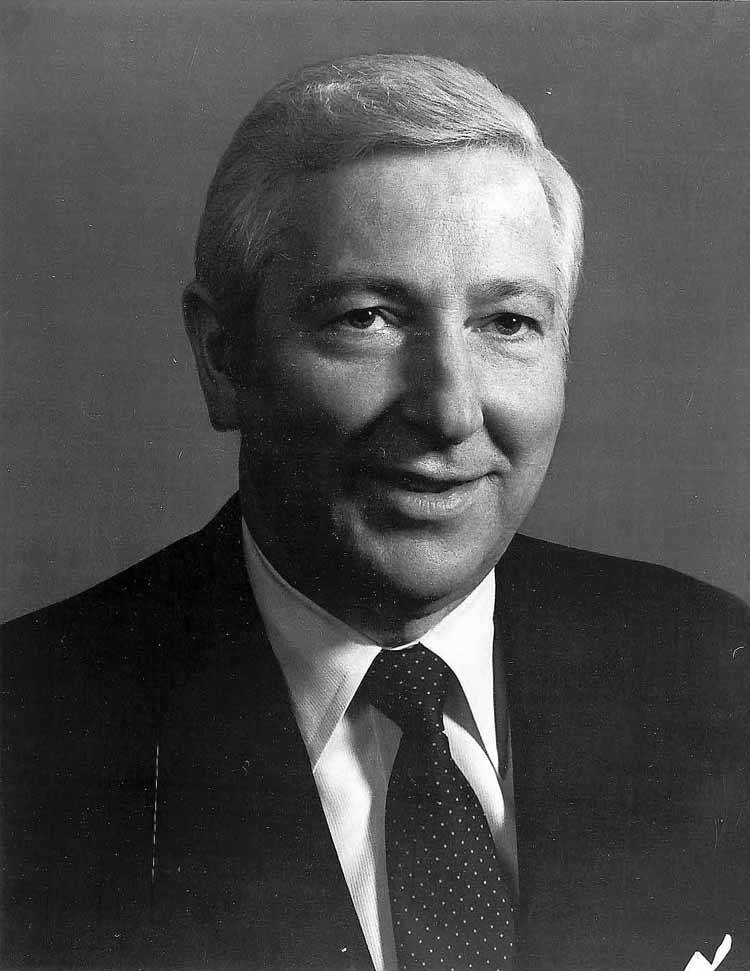
Nominee	Dixy Lee Ray	John Spellman
Party	Democratic	Republican
Popular vote	821,797	687,039
Percentage	53.14%	44.43%
- County results Ray: 40–50% 50–60% 60–70% Spellman: 40–50% 50–60% 60–70%
Governor before election
Daniel J. Evans
Republican
Elected Governor
Dixy Lee Ray
Democratic

The 1976 Washington gubernatorial election was held on November 2, 1976. This election was especially significant in that Washington elected its first female governor, Dixy Lee Ray. Wesley C. Uhlman and John Patric unsuccessfully ran in the blanket primary.

== Primary election ==
=== Candidates ===
- Marvin Durning (D)
- Harley Hoppe (R), King County assessor
- John Patric (R), writer and perennial candidate
- Dixy Lee Ray (D), former chair of United States Atomic Energy Commission
- Carl D. Ricketts (R)
- John D. Spellman (R), King County executive
- Duke Stockton (D)
- Wesley C. Uhlman (D), mayor of Seattle
- Emmett Watson (R)

=== Results ===
Results by county Ray: 20–30%; 30–40%; 40–50%; Ulhman: 20–30%; 30–40%; 40–50%; Spellman: 20–30%; 30–40%

Blanket primary results
Party	Candidate	Votes	%
Democratic	Dixy Lee Ray	205,232	24.09%
Democratic	Wesley C. Uhlman	198,336	23.28%
Republican	John D. Spellman	185,439	21.77%
Democratic	Marvin Durning	136,290	16.00%
Republican	Harley Hoppe	111,957	13.14%
Democratic	Duke Stockton	5,588	0.66%
Republican	Emmett Watson	4,798	0.56%
Republican	Carl D. Ricketts	2,636	0.31%
Republican	John Patric	1,654	0.19%
Total votes		851,930	100.00%

== General election ==
=== Candidates ===
==== Major parties ====
- Dixy Lee Ray (D)
- John D. Spellman (R)

==== Minor parties ====
- Patricia A. Bethard, Socialist Workers
- Red Kelly, OWL
- Henry Killman, Socialist Labor
- Art Manning, American Independent
- Evelyn Olafson, US Labor
- Maurice Woodrow Willey, Jr., Libertarian

=== Results ===
1976 Washington gubernatorial election
Party	Candidate	Votes	%	±%
Democratic	Dixy Lee Ray	821,797	53.14%	+10.32%
Republican	John D. Spellman	687,039	44.43%	−6.36%
American Independent	Art Manning	12,406	0.80%	
OWL	Red Kelly	12,400	0.80%	
Socialist Labor	Henry Killman	4,137	0.27%	+0.08%
Libertarian	Maurice Willey	4,133	0.27%	
Socialist Workers	Patricia A. Bethard	3,106	0.20%	−0.11%
U.S. Labor	Evelyn Olafson	1,364	0.09%	
Majority		134,758	8.71%	
Total votes		1,546,382	100.00%	
Democratic gain from Republican		Swing	+16.67%	

=== Results by county ===
Dixy Lee Ray was the first Democratic gubernatorial candidate to carry Island County and Klickitat County since Clarence D. Martin in 1936. This is the most recent gubernatorial election in which a Democrat has carried Benton County and Franklin County.

County	Dixy Lee Ray Democratic		John D. Spellman Republican		Art Manning AIP		Red Kelly OWL		All Others Various		Margin		Total votes cast
County	#	%	#	%	#	%	#	%	#	%	#	%	Total votes cast
Adams	2,112	44.01%	2,524	52.59%	110	2.29%	28	0.58%	25	0.52%	-412	-8.59%	4,799
Asotin	2,493	42.63%	3,231	55.25%	66	1.13%	24	0.41%	34	0.58%	-738	-12.62%	5,848
Benton	23,006	65.98%	11,367	32.60%	220	0.63%	133	0.38%	141	0.40%	11,639	33.38%	34,867
Chelan	8,278	44.70%	9,926	53.60%	118	0.64%	111	0.60%	84	0.45%	-1,648	-8.90%	18,517
Clallam	10,234	55.58%	7,514	40.81%	294	1.60%	201	1.09%	171	0.93%	2,720	14.77%	18,414
Clark	32,038	52.64%	27,222	44.73%	678	1.11%	507	0.83%	418	0.69%	4,816	7.91%	60,863
Columbia	965	47.68%	1,027	50.74%	24	1.19%	7	0.35%	1	0.05%	-62	-3.06%	2,024
Cowlitz	14,930	54.70%	11.504	42.14%	534	1.96%	154	0.56%	176	0.64%	3,429	12.56%	27,295
Douglas	4,263	50.13%	4,134	48.61%	61	0.72%	28	0.33%	18	0.21%	129	1.52%	8,504
Ferry	805	48.85%	773	46.91%	43	2.61%	11	0.67%	16	0.97%	32	1.94%	1,648
Franklin	6,187	60.81%	3,826	37.61%	65	0.64%	30	0.29%	66	0.65%	2,361	23.21%	10,174
Garfield	579	37.43%	951	61.47%	13	0.84%	1	0.06%	3	0.19%	-372	-24.05%	1,547
Grant	8,148	47.37%	8,589	49.93%	201	1.17%	92	0.53%	171	0.99%	-441	-2.56%	17,201
Grays Harbor	13,567	55.60%	10,072	41.28%	240	0.98%	301	1.23%	220	0.90%	3,495	14.32%	24,400
Island	7,408	53.12%	6,358	45.59%	66	0.47%	53	0.38%	62	0.44%	1,050	7.53%	13,947
Jefferson	3,121	52.28%	2,644	44.29%	65	1.09%	67	1.12%	73	1.22%	477	7.99%	5,970
King	277,502	50.87%	254,945	46.73%	3,117	0.57%	4,813	0.88%	5,141	0.94%	22,557	4.13%	545,518
Kitsap	30,399	59.31%	19,626	38.29%	401	0.78%	312	0.61%	513	1.00%	10,773	21.02%	51,251
Kittitas	4,878	49.83%	4,733	48.35%	47	0.48%	70	0.72%	62	0.63%	145	1.48%	9,790
Klickitat	3,016	54.03%	2,411	43.19%	86	1.54%	37	0.66%	32	0.57%	605	10.84%	5,582
Lewis	13,109	61.43%	7,633	35.77%	352	1.65%	138	0.65%	107	0.50%	5,476	25.66%	21,339
Lincoln	2,153	41.73%	2,907	56.35%	49	0.95%	29	0.56%	21	0.41%	-754	-14.62%	5,159
Mason	6,984	61.57%	4,052	35.72%	126	1.11%	104	0.92%	77	0.68%	2,932	25.85%	11,343
Okanogan	5,543	48.67%	5,462	47.96%	212	1.86%	93	0.82%	79	0.69%	81	0.71%	11,389
Pacific	4,474	60.52%	2,656	35.93%	77	1.04%	99	1.34%	86	1.16%	1,818	24.59%	7,392
Pend Oreille	1,641	52.03%	1,438	45.59%	32	1.01%	24	0.76%	19	0.60%	203	6.44%	3,154
Pierce	99,527	63.27%	54,543	34.67%	884	0.56%	835	0.53%	1,523	0.97%	44,984	28.60%	157,312
San Juan	1,658	45.21%	1,907	52.00%	27	0.74%	42	1.15%	33	0.90%	-249	-6.79%	3,667
Skagit	14,750	54.74%	11,486	42.62%	286	1.06%	224	0.83%	201	0.75%	3,264	12.11%	26,947
Skamania	1,403	54.34%	1,126	43.61%	18	0.70%	21	0.81%	14	0.54%	277	10.73%	2,582
Snohomish	66,369	57.26%	46,946	40.50%	1,072	0.92%	812	0.70%	715	0.62%	19,423	16.76%	115,914
Spokane	61,494	47.67%	64,044	49.65%	1,374	1.07%	1,336	1.04%	750	0.58%	-2,550	-1.98%	128,998
Stevens	4,177	45.50%	4,556	49.62%	276	3.01%	91	0.99%	81	0.88%	-379	-4.13%	9,181
Thurston	23,957	54.11%	18,984	42.88%	297	0.67%	686	1.55%	348	0.79%	4,973	11.23%	44,272
Wahkiakum	938	56.13%	692	41.41%	23	1.38%	9	0.54%	9	0.54%	246	14.72%	1,671
Walla Walla	7,562	41.93%	10,177	56.43%	66	0.37%	92	0.51%	139	0.77%	-2,615	-14.50%	18,036
Whatcom	21,599	53.32%	17,688	43.67%	272	0.67%	408	1.01%	539	1.33%	3,911	9.66%	40,506
Whitman	5,875	38.99%	8,679	57.60%	163	1.08%	202	1.34%	150	1.00%	-2,804	-18.61%	15,069
Yakima	24,655	45.41%	28,689	52.84%	351	0.65%	175	0.32%	422	0.78%	-4,034	-7.43%	54,292
Totals	821,797	53.14%	687,039	44.43%	12,406	0.80%	12,400	0.80%	12,740	0.82%	134,758	8.71%	1,546,382

==== Counties that flipped from Republican to Democratic ====
- Benton
- Clallam
- Clark
- Cowlitz
- Douglas
- Island
- King
- Kittitas
- Klickitat
- Snohomish
- Thurston
- Whatcom

==== Counties that flipped from Democratic to Republican ====
- Stevens
