= Bob Williams (Washington politician) =

American accountant and politician (1942–2022)

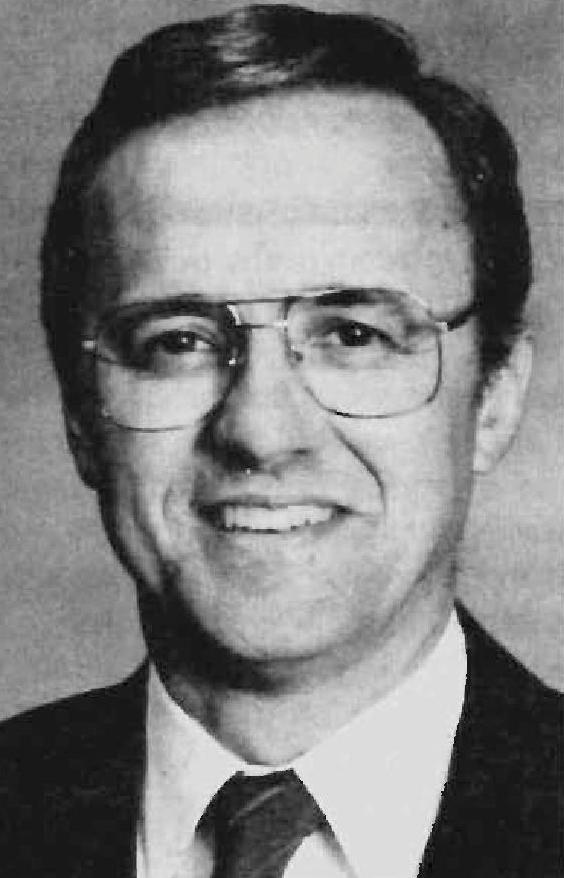

Member of the Washington House of Representatives
- In office January 10, 1983 – January 9, 1989
- Preceded by: John Erak
- Succeeded by: George L. Raiter
- Constituency: 19th
- In office January 8, 1979 – January 10, 1983
- Preceded by: William “Bill” Paris
- Succeeded by: Joe Tanner
- Constituency: 18th

Personal details
- Born: Gomer Robert Williams; February 8, 1942 Pennsylvania, U.S.
- Died: March 15, 2022 (aged 80) Longview, Washington, U.S.
- Party: Republican
- Spouse: Jane Williams
- Children: 3
- Education: Pennsylvania State University (BA)
- Occupation: Accountant

Gomer Robert Williams (February 8, 1942 – March 15, 2022) was an American accountant and politician who served as a member of the Washington House of Representatives, representing the 18th district from 1979 to 1983 and the 19th district from 1983 to 1989. A member of the Republican Party, he was the Republican nominee for governor of Washington in 1988, losing to incumbent Democrat Booth Gardner by over 24 percentage points. In 1991, he founded the conservative think tank Freedom Foundation.

He died in Longview, Washington on March 15, 2022.

Party political offices
| Preceded by John Spellman | Republican nominee for Governor of Washington; 1988 | Succeeded by Ken Eikenberry |
