= 1988 Washington gubernatorial election =

- November 8, 1988
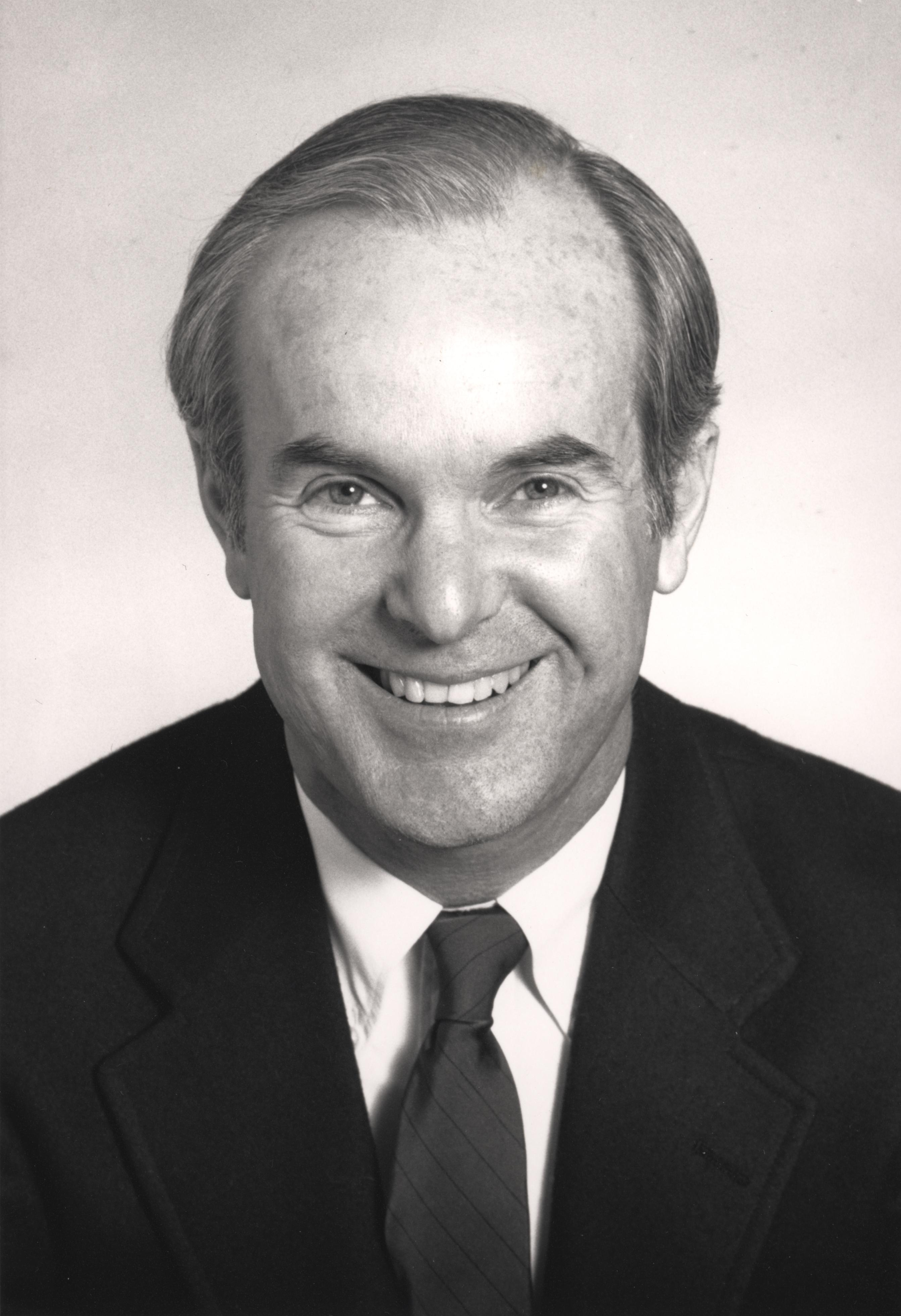

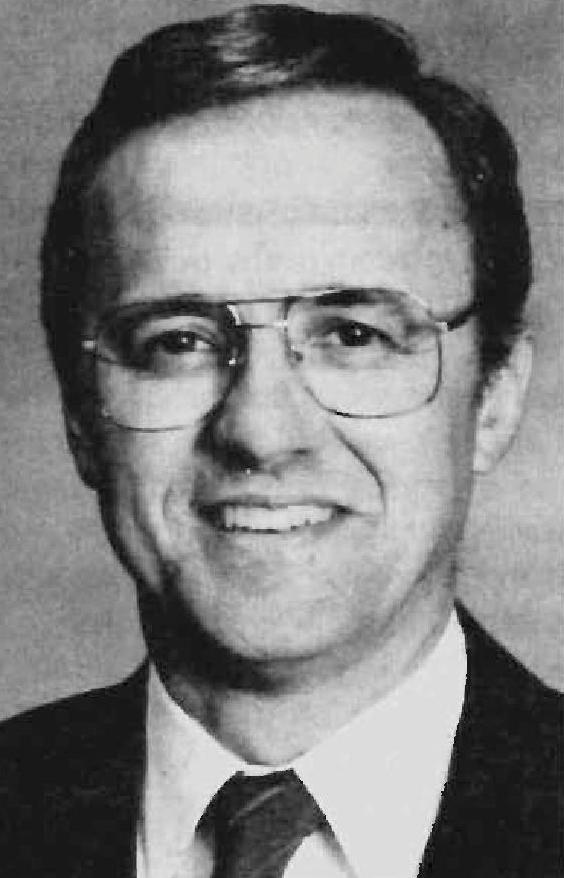
Nominee	Booth Gardner	Bob Williams
Party	Democratic	Republican
Popular vote	1,166,448	708,481
Percentage	62.21%	37.79%
- County results Gardner: 50–60% 60–70% Williams: 50–60% 60–70%
Governor before election
Booth Gardner
Democratic
Elected Governor
Booth Gardner
Democratic

The 1988 Washington gubernatorial election was held on November 8, 1988. Incumbent Democratic governor Booth Gardner won a second term, defeating Republican state representative Bob Williams in a landslide. This election was the first time since 1960 that an incumbent Democratic governor of Washington was re-elected.

Gardner won the highest share of the vote since Clarence D. Martin in 1936. Gardner's 62.21% of the vote is third-highest of any gubernatorial candidate in Washington's history. (Note: Martin received 69.36% in 1936 and Samuel G. Cosgrove received 62.56% in 1908.)

== Primary election ==
=== Candidates ===
==== Democratic ====
- Jeanne Dixon
- Ted Parker Fix
- Booth Gardner, incumbent governor of Washington
- Richard "Onery Dick" Short

==== Republican ====
- Norm Maleng, King County prosecutor
- Paul Dean Santos
- Bob Williams, state representative

==== Independent ====
- Baba Jeanne "BJ" Mangaoang, party leader

=== Results ===
Blanket primary results by county: Gardner: 40–50%; 50–60%; 60–70%; Williams: 40–50%

Blanket primary results
Party	Candidate	Votes	%
Democratic	Booth Gardner (incumbent)	539,243	57.64%
Republican	Bob Williams	187,797	22.07%
Republican	Norm Maleng	139,274	14.89%
Democratic	Jeanne Dixon	31,917	3.41%
Democratic	Richard "Onery Dick" Short	14,782	1.58%
Democratic	Ted Parker Fix	9,302	0.99%
Republican	Paul Dean Santos	7,370	0.79%
Independent	Baba Jeanne Mangaoang	5,818	0.62%
Total votes		935,503	100.00%

== General election ==
=== Candidates ===
- Booth Gardner (D), incumbent governor of Washington
- Bob Williams (R), state representative

=== Debates ===
- Complete video of debate, October 30, 1988 - C-SPAN

=== Results ===
1988 Washington gubernatorial election
Party	Candidate	Votes	%	±%
Democratic	Booth Gardner (incumbent)	1,166,448	62.21%	+8.90%
Republican	Bob Williams	708,481	37.79%	−8.90%
Total votes		1,874,929	100.00%	N/A
Democratic hold				

==== By county ====
Gardner's landslide win made him the first Democrat since Clarence D. Martin in 1936 to carry Chelan County, Garfield County, Lincoln County, San Juan County, Walla Walla County, and Whitman County. However, since this election, no Democrat has won Chelan County, Douglas County, Ferry County, Garfield County, Grant County, Lincoln County, and Okanogan County.

County	Booth Gardner Democratic		Bob Williams Republican		Margin		Total votes cast
County	#	%	#	%	#	%	Total votes cast
Adams	2,228	49.83%	2,243	50.17%	-15	-0.34%	4,471
Asotin	4,345	65.74%	2,264	34.26%	2,081	31.49%	6,609
Benton	15,407	34.44%	29,333	65.56%	-13,926	-31.13%	44,740
Chelan	11,037	58.10%	7,961	41.90%	3,076	16.19%	18,998
Clallam	13,776	59.43%	9,406	40.57%	4,370	18.85%	23,182
Clark	45,072	57.67%	33,086	42.33%	11,986	15.34%	78,158
Columbia	918	46.55%	1,054	53.45%	-136	-6.90%	1,972
Cowlitz	14,154	49.25%	14,584	50.75%	-430	-1.50%	28,738
Douglas	5,208	54.80%	4,296	45.20%	912	9.60%	9,504
Ferry	1,161	57.16%	870	42.84%	291	14.33%	2,031
Franklin	4,438	40.25%	6,587	59.75%	-2,149	-19.49%	11,025
Garfield	783	58.26%	561	41.74%	222	16.52%	1,344
Grant	9,383	51.52%	8,830	48.48%	553	3.04%	18,213
Grays Harbor	16,951	69.79%	7,336	30.21%	9,615	39.59%	24,287
Island	12,369	57.14%	9,277	42.86%	3,092	14.28%	21,646
Jefferson	6,378	65.90%	3,300	34.10%	3,078	31.80%	9,678
King	453,572	69.89%	195,378	30.11%	258,194	39.79%	648,950
Kitsap	42,616	60.62%	27,683	39.38%	14,933	21.24%	70,299
Kittitas	6,723	63.37%	3,886	36.63%	2,837	26.74%	10,609
Klickitat	3,482	57.09%	2,617	42.91%	865	14.18%	6,099
Lewis	10,256	43.39%	13,380	56.61%	-3,124	-13.22%	23,636
Lincoln	2,423	51.12%	2,317	48.88%	106	2.24%	4,740
Mason	9,699	60.94%	6,217	39.06%	3,482	21.88%	15,916
Okanogan	6,824	57.33%	5,078	42.67%	1,746	14.67%	11,902
Pacific	5,513	67.39%	2,668	32.61%	2,845	34.78%	8,181
Pend Oreille	2,317	60.43%	1,517	39.57%	800	20.87%	3,834
Pierce	119,459	63.28%	69,307	36.72%	50,152	26.57%	188,766
San Juan	3,814	65.87%	1,976	34.13%	1,838	31.74%	5,790
Skagit	19,902	60.33%	13,089	39.67%	6,813	20.65%	32,991
Skamania	1,653	52.36%	1,504	47.64%	149	4.72%	3,157
Snohomish	105,357	62.53%	63,123	37.47%	42,234	25.07%	168,480
Spokane	80,678	56.72%	61,571	43.28%	19,107	13.43%	142,249
Stevens	5,880	48.48%	6,249	51.52%	-369	-3.04%	12,129
Thurston	42,583	62.74%	25,292	37.26%	17,291	25.47%	67,875
Wahkiakum	820	52.06%	755	47.94%	65	4.13%	1,575
Walla Walla	8,916	50.36%	8,789	49.64%	127	0.72%	17,705
Whatcom	31,321	62.32%	18,934	37.68%	12,387	24.65%	50,255
Whitman	9,337	60.78%	6,026	39.22%	3,311	21.55%	15,363
Yakima	29,695	49.63%	30,137	50.37%	-442	-0.74%	59,832
Totals	1,166,448	62.21%	708,481	37.79%	457,967	24.43%	1,874,929

==== Counties that flipped from Republican to Democratic ====
- Chelan
- Douglas
- Garfield
- Grant
- Island
- Lincoln
- Okanogan
- San Juan
- Spokane
- Walla Walla
- Whitman

==== Counties that flipped from Democratic to Republican ====
- Cowlitz
- Lewis
- Stevens
