= George Kupka =

American politician (1912–1989)

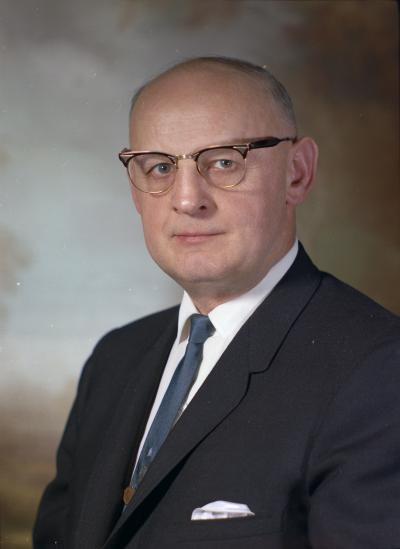
- Kupka in 1967

Member of the Washington Senate from the 27th district
- In office January 14, 1957 – January 13, 1969
- Preceded by: Neil J. Hoff
- Succeeded by: Joe Stortini

Member of the Washington House of Representatives from the 27th district
- In office January 10, 1955 – January 14, 1957
- Preceded by: Joe Macek
- Succeeded by: Marion C. Gleason
- In office January 10, 1949 – January 10, 1953
- Preceded by: James K. Copeland
- Succeeded by: A. E. Farrar

Personal details
- Born: July 3, 1912 South Prairie, Washington, U.S.
- Died: December 30, 1989 (aged 77) Tacoma, Washington, U.S.
- Party: Democratic
- Spouse: Belle D. (Stone) Kupka
- Children: 2 step children and 2 adopted.

George J. Kupka (July 3, 1912 – December 30, 1989) was an American politician in the state of Washington. He served in the Washington House of Representatives and Washington State Senate. Prior to his State service, he served in the Navy during WWII and also was a deputy sheriff in Pierce County's Criminal division of the Pierce County Sheriff's Office.
