= Freedom Foundation (Washington) =

Free-market conservative think tank

- Formation: 1991
- Founder: Bob Williams
- Type: Public policy think tank
- Tax ID no.: 94-3136961
- Registration no.: 601292128
- Location: Olympia, Washington
- Leader: Aaron Withe
- Budget: Revenue: $21.5 million Expenses: $19.3 million (FYE December 2024)
- Staff: 122 (2023)
- Website: www.freedomfoundation.com
- Formerly called: Evergreen Freedom Foundation

The Evergreen Freedom Foundation, operating as the Freedom Foundation, is a conservative think tank founded in the state of Washington. Freedom Foundation has offices in Washington, Oregon, California, Pennsylvania, and Ohio. In 2021, they announced their national expansion into all 50 states. The organization is registered with the United States Internal Revenue Service (IRS) as a 501(c)(3) charitable organization.

== Background and mission ==
The Freedom Foundation was founded in 1991 by Lynn Harsh and former Republican legislator and gubernatorial candidate Bob Williams. The Freedom Foundation says "We're a battle tank that's battering the entrenched power of left-wing government union bosses who represent a permanent lobby for bigger government, higher taxes, and radical social agendas." The governing principles of the organization are to "eliminate the desire for dependence on government that has permeated [American] culture" and to promote an understanding of the principles of liberty by "disseminat[ing] those truths and motivat[ing] the citizen to act upon them."

== Policy areas ==
The Freedom Foundation's efforts center on public policy research and advocacy in the areas of state budget and tax policies, labor, welfare, health care and education reform, and citizenship and governance issues. Policy analysts for the Freedom Foundation have also documented the impacts of minimum wage increases and mandatory paid sick leave. The foundation has launched an aggressive anti-union campaign.

=== Public sector unions ===
The Freedom Foundation's efforts center around an aggressive anti-public sector union outreach campaign and strategic litigation against government unions. In 2018, the U.S. Supreme Court ruled in Janus v. AFSCME that public employees have the 1st Amendment Right of Freedom of Association and can no longer be required to pay union dues or fees as a condition of employment. In response, the Freedom Foundation launched an opt-out campaign which generates opt-out forms for public employees looking to leave their unions. As of July 2022, the organization had facilitated the opting-out of more than 115,000 union members.

The organization has filed numerous lawsuits and complaints against public-sector unions, including with respect to the ability of a union to speak to newly hired government employees and a union's failure to file all required political spending reports. The Freedom Foundation contests the power of public sector unions to use dues to impact public policy, elections, and culture. Former Freedom Foundation CEO Tom McCabe wrote that, "Labor bosses are the single greatest threat to freedom and opportunity in America today. By taking money from hard-working, dues-paying Americans, they’re funding a broken political culture in states like Oregon and Washington." He added, "The Freedom Foundation has a proven plan for bankrupting and defeating government unions through education, litigation, legislation and community activation."

=== Teacher Freedom Alliance ===
In March 2025, the Freedom Foundation established the Teacher Freedom Alliance, a new national organization to provide educators with professional support services and resources. The group is designed to provide educators with an alternative to teachers unions. On September 25, 2025, Oklahoma Superintendent of Public Instruction Ryan Walters announced he would resign from his position and become the CEO of the Teacher Freedom Alliance.

== Litigation ==
Freedom Foundation has filed numerous lawsuits and complaints against public-sector unions, with more than 70 labor lawsuits pending as of 2021.

=== Davenport v. Washington Education Association ===
In 2007, the foundation filed a complaint against the Washington Education Association (WEA), accusing the union of unlawfully spending worker fees on politics. In response to that complaint, the state in turn sued the union, which represents public school employees, on the grounds that the WEA was unlawfully spending some workers' fees on politics. The matter was taken on appeal to the United States Supreme Court. The Supreme Court unanimously decided in Davenport v. Washington Education Association that states can require public-employee labor unions to get consent from workers before using their fees for political activities. The Washington State Legislature later modified the law in a way that blunted the court's decision.

In 2014, the Supreme Court ruled in the Harris v. Quinn case that the "First Amendment prohibits the collection of an agency fee from the plaintiffs in the case, home healthcare providers who do not wish to join or support a union." In February 2017, having determined that the "SEIU [Service Employee International Union] and state governors weren't going to inform home health workers about their ability to leave the union," Freedom Foundation launched an effort to inform these workers of their right to not pay dues to a union they do not support. In June 2018, the Supreme Court further solidified these rights in Janus v. ASFCME (585 U.S. ___ (2018), in support of which the Freedom Foundation filed an amicus curiae brief.

In March 2015, the organization filed a federal lawsuit on behalf of four family child-care providers who objected to paying union fees to SEIU 925. In December 2015, the organization informed government employees of their right to quit their union membership by dressing as Santa Claus and standing outside government buildings. In response to Freedom Foundation's efforts to inform union members of their rights, a group of unions created the Northwest Accountability Project and filed a complaint to attempt to get Freedom Foundation's 501(c)(3) tax-exempt status revoked. The group also distributed flyers in then Freedom Foundation CEO Tom McCabe's neighborhood attacking McCabe and made robocalls to members of his community and church. The Democratic-majority Washington State Senate passed legislation to remove birth dates of public employees aimed at preventing the Freedom Foundation from being able to contact state employees in their campaign to alert public employees of their right to leave the union.

=== Lawsuits by the Washington Attorney General ===
In 2015, Attorney General Bob Ferguson's office filed suit against the Freedom Foundation claiming violations of the state campaign-finance laws regarding the organization's opposition to Initiative 1501, a statewide ballot measure. The complaint was initiated by the SEIU, which organized the campaign promoting the initiative. After an initial win for Freedom Foundation in the superior court, the Washington Supreme Court found in favor of the Attorney General in a split 5–4 decision. The Foundation has appealed the decision to the U.S. Supreme Court.

On October 8, 2019, Attorney General Ferguson filed a new campaign finance lawsuit against the Freedom Foundation. The lawsuit alleges that the organization paid its staff to oppose a 2016 progressive income tax initiative in the city of Olympia, but failed to report those expenditures to the Public Disclosure Commission.

Ferguson's office had also filed campaign-disclosure lawsuits against several unions in response to complaints from the Freedom Foundation. In 2016 two affiliates of the SEIU settled lawsuits by agreeing to pay civil penalties to the state over campaign-disclosure omissions based upon complaints filled by the Freedom Foundation. Additionally, in 2019, the SEIU agreed to pay $128,000 in fines from a complaint filed by the Freedom Foundation regarding campaign donation disclosure.

== Funding ==
The foundation has received funding from private donors and groups such as the Koch family foundations, Sarah Scaife Foundation, Donors Trust, the Richard and Helen DeVos Foundation, and the State Policy Network. The Freedom Foundation was awarded $1.5 million over three years by the Bradley Foundation to "educate union workers about their rights."

=== CARES Act ===
During the 2020 COVID-19 pandemic, the group received assistance between $350,000 and $1 million in federally backed small business loans from Commencement Bank as part of the Paycheck Protection Program. The nonprofit stated it would allow them to retain 82 jobs. Their loan was seen as notable, since they campaign against excess government spending and are small-government advocate. The Seattle Times columnist Danny Westneat noted that the Freedom Foundation has "been rallying against government spending and taxes since the early 1990s", and noting the organization's website states "We have a vision of a day when opportunity, responsible self-governance, and free markets flourish in America because its citizens understand and defend the principles from which freedom is derived. We accept no government support."
