= Booth Gardner =

Governor of Washington from 1985 to 1993

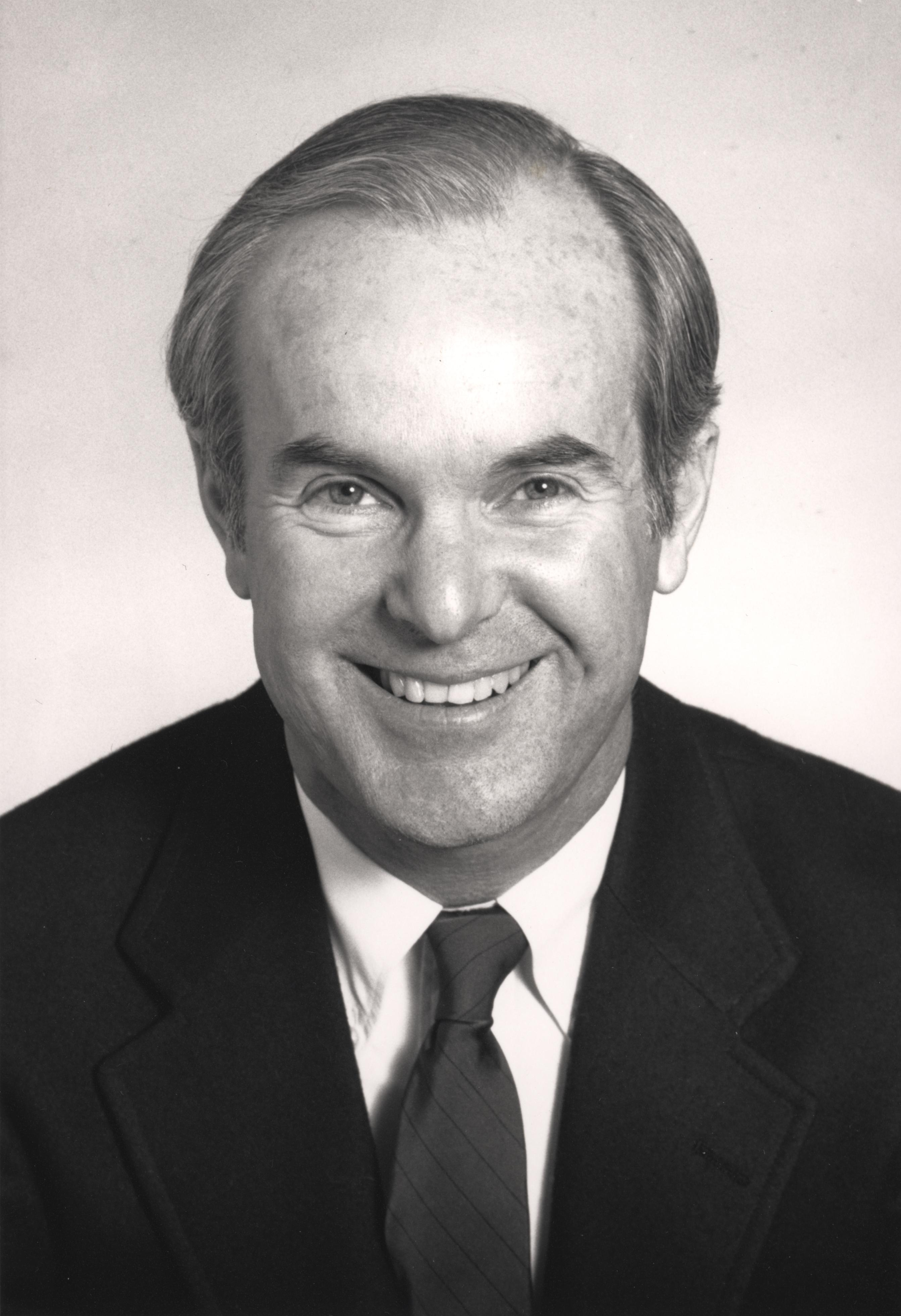

19th Governor of Washington
- In office January 16, 1985 – January 13, 1993
- Lieutenant: John Cherberg; Joel Pritchard
- Preceded by: John Spellman
- Succeeded by: Mike Lowry

Chair of the National Governors Association
- In office July 31, 1990 – August 20, 1991
- Preceded by: Terry Branstad
- Succeeded by: John Ashcroft

1st Pierce County Executive
- In office May 1, 1981 – January 1, 1985
- Preceded by: Office established
- Succeeded by: Joe Stortini

Member of the Washington Senate from the 26th district
- In office January 11, 1971 – December 13, 1973
- Preceded by: Larry Faulk
- Succeeded by: Clifford W. Beck

Personal details
- Born: William Booth Gardner; August 21, 1936 Tacoma, Washington, U.S.
- Died: March 15, 2013 (aged 76) Tacoma, Washington, U.S.
- Party: Democratic
- Spouses: Jean Forstrom (m. 1960; div. 2001) Cynthia Perkins (m. 2001; div. 2008)
- Education: University of Washington, Seattle (BA); Harvard University (MBA)
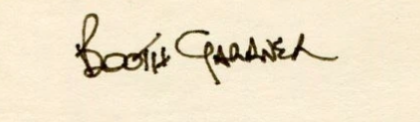
- Signature

William Booth Gardner (August 21, 1936 – March 15, 2013) was an American politician who served as the 19th governor of Washington, from 1985 to 1993. He also served as the ambassador of the General Agreement on Tariffs and Trade, or GATT. A member of the Democratic Party, Gardner served as a state senator from 1971 to 1973, and was the Pierce County executive prior to his tenure as governor. His service was notable for advancing standards-based education and environmental protection.

== Early life, education, and early career ==
Born in Tacoma, Gardner attended Clover Park Junior High in Lakewood before graduating from Lakeside School in Seattle. His parents divorced when he was very young; through his mother's remarriage he became an heir to the Weyerhaeuser fortune. His mother and younger sister, his only sibling, died in a plane crash when he was 14.

Gardner was a graduate of the University of Washington and Harvard Business School. His stepfather was Norton Clapp, one of the original owners of the Seattle Space Needle. Booth co-owned the Tacoma Tides, who played for one year in the American Soccer League in 1976. He was also a part-time soccer coach for various teams, including the Tacoma Cozars. In 1978, he co-owned the Colorado Caribous franchise in the NASL with Jim Guercio.

== Governor of Washington (1985–1993) ==
In the Democratic primary for governor in 1984, Gardner defeated Jim McDermott. In the general election, he unseated one-term Republican incumbent John Spellman. Gardner was easily elected to a second term in 1988 over state representative Bob Williams, and chose not to seek a third term in 1992.

During his tenure as governor, Gardner signed into law a health care program that provided state medical insurance for the working poor. He helped develop land-use and growth-management policies that made Washington an early environmental leader, steered hundreds of millions of dollars of increased spending toward state universities, increased standardized testing in public education, and improved legal protections for gay people.

On March 21, 1992, Gardner signed a measure that outlawed selling "obscene" music to minors in the State of Washington. The law went into effect on June 11 of that year, and made record store retailers and their employees criminally liable for selling such music to anyone under the age of 18.

== Later years ==
A year after leaving office, Gardner was diagnosed with Parkinson's disease. In 2006, he announced his support for assisted suicide. In 2008, he filed and successfully spearheaded the campaign for Initiative 1000, Washington's Death With Dignity Act, which was closely modeled on Oregon's assisted dying law; he remained involved in implementing the Act. Gardner said that he supported going even further than the current Washington and Oregon laws, to eventually permit lethal prescriptions for people whose suffering was deemed unbearable without the requirement that the patient have a terminal condition.

In 2009, The Last Campaign of Governor Booth Gardner, a short documentary film, was produced by Just Media and HBO, chronicling the Initiative 1000 campaign. The film was nominated for an Academy Award for Best Documentary Short.

Gardner supported eliminating Washington's WASL test, a standardized test that was required to graduate high school. It was replaced in 2009 by the MSP for grades three through eight and the HSPE for grades eight through twelve.

Gardner died of Parkinson's disease at age 76 at his home on March 15, 2013.

Political offices
New office	Executive of Pierce County; 1981–1984	Succeeded by Joe Stortini
Preceded by John Spellman	Governor of Washington; 1985–1993	Succeeded by Mike Lowry
Preceded by Terry Branstad	Chair of the National Governors Association; 1990–1991	Succeeded by John Ashcroft
Party political offices
Preceded by Jim McDermott	Democratic nominee for Governor of Washington; 1984, 1988	Succeeded by Mike Lowry
