= Joe Stortini =

American politician

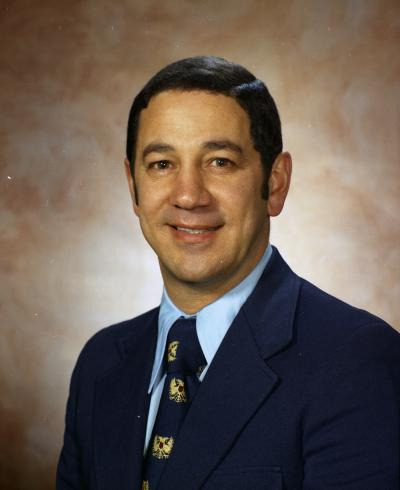
- Stortini in 1973

2nd Pierce County Executive
- In office January 1, 1985 – January 1, 1993
- Preceded by: Booth Gardner
- Succeeded by: Doug Sutherland

Member of the Pierce County Council from the 4th District
- In office May 1, 1981 – January 1, 1985
- Preceded by: Constituency established
- Succeeded by: James Edward "Jim" Salatino

Pierce County Commissioner
- In office January 1, 1977 – May 1, 1981
- Preceded by: George Sheridan
- Succeeded by: Office abolished

Member of the Washington Senate from the 27th district
- In office January 13, 1969 – January 10, 1977
- Preceded by: George Kupka
- Succeeded by: R. Lorraine Wojahn

Personal details
- Born: Joseph Lewis Stortini; December 4, 1932 (age 93) Tacoma, Washington, U.S.
- Party: Democratic
- Occupation: Politician, Restaurant Owner/Operator, Teacher

Joseph Lewis Stortini (born December 4, 1932) is an American restauranteer, educator, and politician in the state of Washington. He served the 27th district from 1969 to 1977.

== Early life ==
Stortini was born in Tacoma, Washington, to Giuseppe Stortini and Giuseppina Piazza, both Italian immigrants. Stortini's father immigrated from Porto Sant'Elpidio, Fermo in 1914. His mother was born in Domanico, Calabria in 1909. His parents met and eventually settled in Tacoma's 5th ward, which at the time was made up of predominately southern European immigrants. During his early years in Tacoma's hilltop neighborhoods, he developed a passion for athletics. He attended University of Puget Sound, where he played both football and baseball. After graduating with a degree in education, he went on to Oregon State University, receiving a master's degree in education.

== Career ==
Stortini started his career as a public high school teacher in the Tacoma Public School district, where he worked from 1955 to 1975. In the late 1980s, he opened the Mama Stortini's restaurant, which he later sold. In 1984, Stortini was elected Pierce County Executive.

Stortini served two terms in the state Senate, two terms on the Pierce County Board of County Commissioners, and was elected twice as county executive.

Stortini opened the Joeseppi's Italian restaurant in November 2005.

== Affair and wrongful-death suit ==
Stortini's affair with his employee, Susan Webstad, was brought to light when he made a 911 call after she overdosed. A wrongful-death suit against Stortini by her estate was dismissed, with the appeals court finding that "Washington law provides no general duty to protect others from self-inflicted harm."
