= Clifford W. Beck =

American politician

C. W. Beck
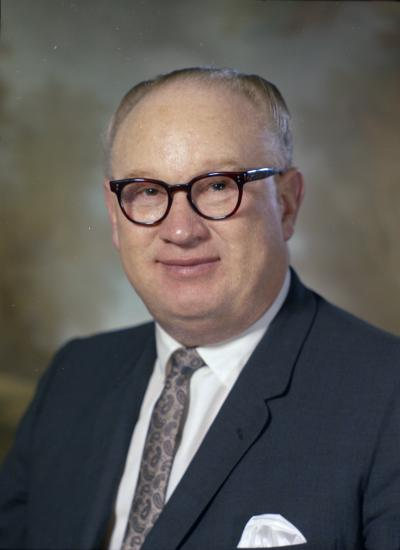

Member of the Washington House of Representatives from the 23rd district
- In office 1961–1973

Member of the Washington House of Representatives from the 26th district
- In office 1973–1975

Member of the Washington State Senate from the 26th district
- In office 1974–1979
- Preceded by: Booth Gardner

Personal details
- Born: 1907 Bloomington, Indiana, U.S.
- Died: December 8, 1985 (aged 77) Port Orchard, Washington, U.S.
- Party: Democratic

Clifford Wallace (Red) Beck (1907 – December 8, 1985) was an American politician in the state of Washington. He served in the Washington House of Representatives for the 26th district from 1961 to 1975 and in the Senate from 1974 to 1979.
