= Lou Guzzo =

American journalist (1919–2013)

- Born: Louis R. Guzzo; January 11, 1919
- Died: June 29, 2013 (aged 94)
- Occupation: Journalist, author, television commentator

Louis R Guzzo (January 11, 1919 – June 29, 2013) was an American journalist, author, and television commentator in Seattle, Washington. He was an art and theater critic for 20 years at the Seattle Times, then served as the managing editor of the Seattle Post-Intelligencer, where his investigative team wrote stories that led to the indictments of more than fifty government officials.

Guzzo was an ally of Washington state governor Dixy Lee Ray. He worked with her at the U.S. Atomic Energy Commission, co-authored books with her, and helped in her successful bid for governor in 1976.

Guzzo appeared regularly on KIRO-TV and KIRO (AM) radio, where he was also an editorial consultant. In 1986, a commentary attacking "punk rock" fans caught the attention of the Seattle crossover thrash band The Dehumanizers. In response the group recorded a satirical song "Kill Lou Guzzo" on their debut 7-inch EP. The record used unauthorized audio clips from Guzzo's TV editorial. Group members later received a cease and desist letter from KIRO and Guzzo.

He had several e-books published, and has had numerous speeches, talks, and commentaries posted to YouTube. After his retirement from KIRO, Guzzo maintained a website where he continued to write a daily commentary on current events. He was a resident of Newcastle, Washington. Guzzo died in 2013 at the age of 94.
