= 1980 Washington gubernatorial election =

- November 4, 1980
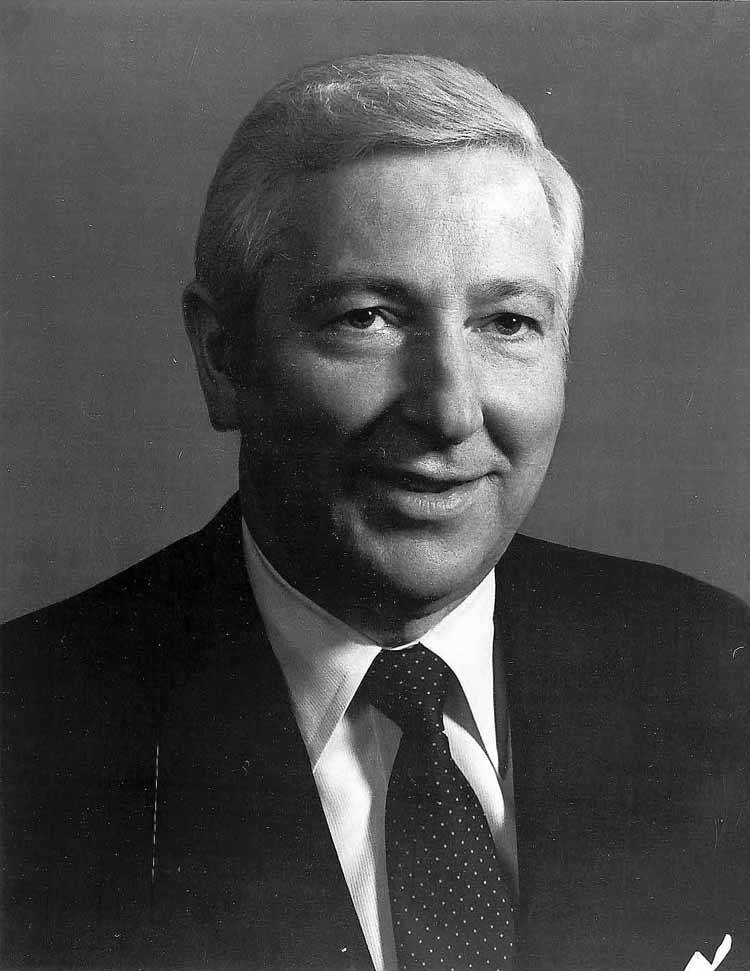

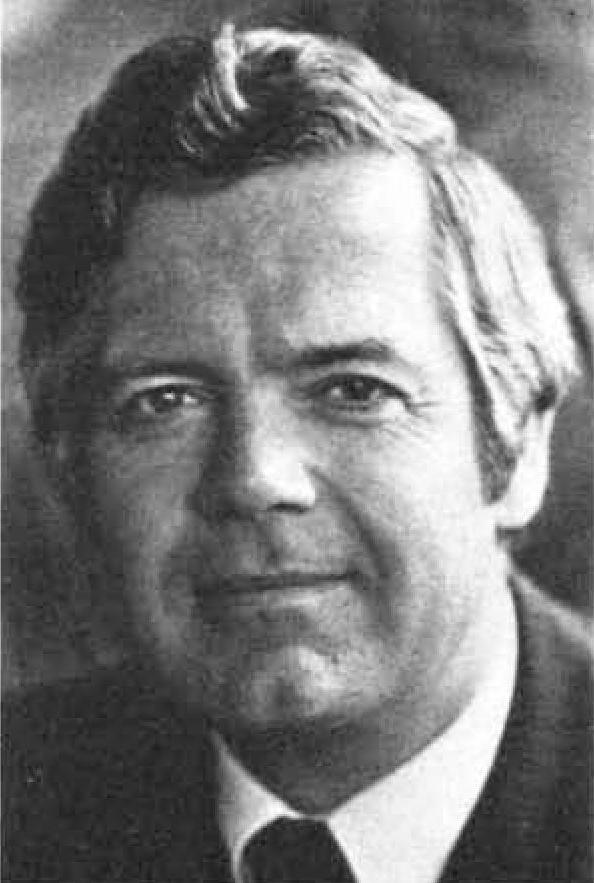
Nominee	John Spellman	Jim McDermott
Party	Republican	Democratic
Popular vote	981,083	749,813
Percentage	56.68%	43.32%
- County results Spellman: 50–60% 60–70% McDermott: 50–60%
Governor before election
Dixy Lee Ray
Democratic
Elected Governor
John Spellman
Republican

The 1980 Washington gubernatorial election was held on November 4, 1980. Incumbent Democratic governor Dixy Lee Ray ran for a second term, but lost in the primary to State Representative Jim McDermott. McDermott was defeated in the general election by Republican candidate John Spellman, the King County Executive. As of 2026, this is the last time a Republican was elected Governor of Washington, thus beginning the longest Democratic streak in any of the 50 state governorships once Spellman left office.

== Primary election ==
=== Candidates ===
==== Democratic ====
- Robert L. Baldwin, Sr.
- Douglas P. Bestle
- Caroline "Hope" Diamond
- Lloyd G. Isley
- Jef Jaisun
- Jim McDermott, psychiatrist, state senator, and candidate for governor in 1972
- Dixy Lee Ray, incumbent governor of Washington

==== Republican ====
- Duane Berentson, Speaker of Washington House of Representatives
- Bruce Chapman, Secretary of State of Washington
- Patrick Sean McGowan
- Louise A. Saluteen
- John Spellman, King County Executive
- Rabbine Matthew Sutich

=== Results ===
Results by county McDermott: 20–30%; 30–40%; 40–50%; Ray: 20–30%; 30–40%; 40–50%; Spellman: 20–30%; Berentson: 20–30%; 30–40%

Blanket primary results
Party	Candidate	Votes	%
Democratic	Jim McDermott	321,256	33.04%
Democratic	Dixy Lee Ray (incumbent)	234,252	24.09%
Republican	John Spellman	162,426	16.70%
Republican	Duane Berentson	154,724	15.91%
Republican	Bruce Chapman	70,875	7.29%
Republican	Patrick Sean McGowan	7,324	0.75%
Democratic	Caroline Diamond	4,184	0.43%
Democratic	Robert L. Baldwin Sr.	3,578	0.37%
Socialist Workers	Mary Nell Bockman	2,833	0.29%
Democratic	Lloyd G. Isley	2,723	0.28%
Republican	Louise A. Saluteen	2,622	0.27%
Democratic	Douglas P. Bestle	2,481	0.26%
Republican	Rabbine Matthew Sutich	1,606	0.17%
Democratic	Jef Jaisun	1,476	0.15%
Total votes		972,360	100.00%

== General election ==
=== Candidates ===
- Jim McDermott (D), psychiatrist, state senator, and candidate for governor in 1972
- John Spellman (R), King County Executive

=== Results ===
1980 Washington gubernatorial election
Party	Candidate	Votes	%	±%
Republican	John Spellman	981,083	56.68%	+12.25%
Democratic	Jim McDermott	749,813	43.32%	−9.82%
Total votes		1,730,896	100.00%	N/A
Republican gain from Democratic				

==== By county ====
John Spellman was the first Republican to carry Franklin County, Mason County, and Pierce County since Roland H. Hartley in 1928. Franklin County has voted Republican in every subsequent gubernatorial election. Spellman is the most recent Republican to have won King County and Thurston County. Snohomish County and Whatcom County have voted Republican only once since this election. (Note: In 2004 and 1992, respectively)

County results
County	Jim McDermott Democratic		John Spellman Republican		Margin		Total votes
County	#	%	#	%	#	%	Total votes
Adams	1,528	31.92%	3,259	68.08%	1,731	36.16%	4,787
Asotin	2,859	42.83%	3,817	57.17%	958	14.35%	6,676
Benton	13,637	30.75%	30,710	69.25%	17,073	38.50%	44,347
Chelan	7,670	39.53%	11,734	60.47%	4,064	20.94%	19,404
Clallam	9,567	42.91%	12,729	57.09%	3,162	14.18%	22,296
Clark	32,364	45.21%	39,225	54.79%	6,861	9.58%	71,589
Columbia	670	33.14%	1,352	66.86%	682	33.73%	2,022
Cowlitz	13,910	49.55%	14,160	50.45%	250	0.89%	28,070
Douglas	3,462	39.75%	5,248	60.25%	1,786	20.51%	8,710
Ferry	1,067	52.74%	956	47.26%	-111	-5.49%	2,023
Franklin	4,454	38.06%	7,249	61.94%	2,795	23.88%	11,703
Garfield	502	34.01%	974	65.99%	472	31.98%	1,476
Grant	6,989	39.22%	10,839	60.78%	3,840	21.55%	17,818
Grays Harbor	13,098	50.24%	12,971	49.76%	-127	-0.49%	26,069
Island	6,998	38.28%	11,285	61.72%	4,287	23.45%	18,283
Jefferson	4,105	50.89%	3,961	49.11%	-144	-1.79%	8,066
King	267,218	44.90%	327,941	55.10%	60,723	10.20%	595,159
Kitsap	24,150	39.90%	36,372	60.10%	12,222	20.19%	60,522
Kittitas	4,822	45.47%	5,783	54.53%	961	9.06%	10,605
Klickitat	3,152	51.71%	2,944	48.29%	-208	-3.41%	6,096
Lewis	8,580	37.62%	14,230	62.38%	5,650	24.77%	22,810
Lincoln	1,909	35.48%	3,471	64.52%	1,562	29.03%	5,380
Mason	6,357	46.16%	7,414	53.84%	1,057	7.68%	13,771
Okanogan	5,741	46.11%	6,710	53.89%	969	7.78%	12,451
Pacific	4,650	57.92%	3,379	42.08%	-1,271	-15.83%	8,029
Pend Oreille	1,688	45.22%	2,045	54.78%	357	9.56%	3,733
Pierce	75,305	43.38%	98,289	56.62%	22,984	13.24%	173,594
San Juan	2,315	47.23%	2,587	52.77%	272	5.55%	4,902
Skagit	13,683	44.59%	17,003	55.41%	3,320	10.82%	30,686
Skamania	1,603	54.08%	1,361	45.92%	-242	-8.16%	2,964
Snohomish	60,587	44.62%	75,203	55.38%	14,616	10.76%	135,790
Spokane	56,827	40.24%	84,400	59.76%	27,573	19.52%	141,227
Stevens	4,322	37.58%	7,178	62.42%	2,856	24.83%	11,500
Thurston	23,122	42.10%	31,803	57.90%	8,681	15.81%	54,925
Wahkiakum	926	54.70%	767	45.30%	-159	-9.39%	1,693
Walla Walla	6,954	36.70%	11,993	63.30%	5,039	26.60%	18,947
Whatcom	22,215	48.36%	23,722	51.64%	1,507	3.28%	45,937
Whitman	7,195	42.40%	9,773	57.60%	2,578	15.19%	16,968
Yakima	23,612	39.45%	36,246	60.55%	12,634	21.11%	59,858
Totals	749,813	43.32%	981,083	56.68%	231,270	13.36%	1,730,896

==== Counties that flipped from Democratic to Republican ====
- Benton
- Clallam
- Clark
- Cowlitz
- Douglas
- Franklin
- Island
- King
- Kitsap
- Kittitas
- Klickitat
- Lewis
- Mason
- Okanogan
- Pend Oreille
- Pierce
- Skagit
- Snohomish
- Thurston
- Whatcom
