= Joe Tanner (Washington politician) =

American politician from Washington

Member of the Washington House of Representatives from the 18th district
- In office 1983–1987
- Preceded by: Bob Williams
- Succeeded by: Linda Smith

Member of the Washington Senate from the 18th district
- In office 1987–1989
- Preceded by: Bob Williams
- Succeeded by: Linda Smith

Personal details
- Party: Democratic
- Education: Harvard College (BA); University of Texas School of Law (JD)

Joe Tanner is an American politician from Buckley, Washington. He served in the Washington House of Representatives from 1983 to 1987. He also served in the Washington Senate from 1987 to 1989.
