= OWL Party =

Frivolous political party in Washington, United States

The OWL Party of Washington was a minor political party founded in a tavern and jazz club, the Tumwater Conservatory, in Tumwater, Washington, to field candidates in the 1976 elections.

== History ==
The party was founded by the owner of a jazz club, Red Kelly, to change Washington's liquor laws.

The party's name, OWL, was a double acronym, standing for "Out With Logic, On With Lunacy;" its motto was "We don't give a hoot!".

The OWL Party secured a place on the ballot for the 1976 elections. The relative ease with which this party gained access to the electoral process, however, forced the Washington State Legislature to re-evaluate and increase the barriers for minor-party access to the ballot. The changes were challenged, unsuccessfully, by established minor parties like the Socialist Workers Party.
