= Jack Metcalf (politician) =

American politician (1927–2007)

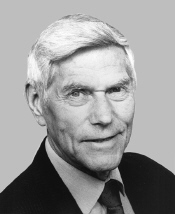

Member of the U.S. House of Representatives from Washington's 2nd district
- In office January 3, 1995 – January 3, 2001
- Preceded by: Al Swift
- Succeeded by: Rick Larsen

Member of the Washington State Senate
- In office January 12, 1981 – January 11, 1993
- Preceded by: Jack Wanamaker
- Succeeded by: Mary Margaret Haugen
- Constituency: 10th
- In office January 9, 1967 – January 13, 1975
- Preceded by: Robert L. Charette
- Succeeded by: Susan Gould
- Constituency: 21st

Member of the Washington House of Representatives from the 38th district
- In office January 9, 1961 – January 11, 1965
- Preceded by: August P. Mardesich
- Succeeded by: Richard A. King

Personal details
- Born: November 30, 1927 Marysville, Washington, U.S.
- Died: March 15, 2007 (aged 79) Langley, Washington, U.S.
- Resting place: Bayview Cemetery, Langley, Washington
- Party: Republican
- Spouse: Norma Metcalf
- Children: 4
- Education: Pacific Lutheran University (BA); University of Washington (MEd)

Military service
- Allegiance: United States
- Branch/service: United States Army
- Years of service: 1946–1947
- Battles/wars: Cold War

Jack H. Metcalf (November 30, 1927 – March 15, 2007) was an American politician and educator and who served as a member of the United States House of Representatives from 1995 to 2001. He represented the 2nd district of Washington State and was a Republican.

== Biography ==
Born in Marysville, Washington, and raised in Langley, Metcalf graduated from high school and entered the U.S. Army, and was discharged in 1947. He then worked for two years with the U.S. Fish and Wildlife Service as a marshal in Alaska. Metcalf received a bachelor's degree in education from Pacific Lutheran University in 1951, and a master's degree from the University of Washington in Seattle in 1966. Metcalf was a high school and junior high teacher (civics, math) for thirty years, mostly in Everett, later retiring to run a bed and breakfast on his family's homestead at Langley.

Metcalf was first elected to the state legislature in 1960, representing the 38th District. Defeated for a third term in 1964, he was elected to the state senate in 1966 from the 21st District and served until 1974, and served again from the 10th District from 1980 to 1992. He twice ran unsuccessfully against incumbent Democrat Warren Magnuson for the U.S. Senate in 1968 and 1974. In 1992, Metcalf again sought national office, but was unable to defeat incumbent Democrat Al Swift in the House election.

With Swift retiring from the House in 1994, Metcalf ran yet again. This time, he was elected; he was re-elected in 1996 and 1998. A supporter of term limits such as those proposed in the 1994 Contract with America (which Metcalf had signed), Metcalf did not run for re-election in 2000 in order to honor his 1994 campaign promise that if elected he would serve a maximum of three terms.

A Goldwater conservative, during the latter part of his political career Metcalf was known as an opponent of the Federal Reserve, which he considered unconstitutional. He also built a close relationship with many in organized labor, especially with the building trade unions. In his last term in office (1998–2000) he surprised some observers by taking some additional positions unusual for a conservative Republican, such as working with Paul Watson and Sea Shepherd Conservation Society to protest whaling by the Makah people, and hiring Washington state antiwar speaker and writer Craig B. Hulet as a special assistant. He also cosponsored legislation with Congressman Dennis Kucinich to label genetically modified foods.

Metcalf also demonstrated a strong pragmatic streak while serving in Congress, including seeking out a position as a conferee on the TEA-21 Act of 1998. He delivered significant funding for a number of transportation infrastructure programs because of this work. He was also a strong supporter of both Boeing and its workers. In 1999 shortly after the crash of EgyptAir Flight 990 (a Boeing 767) he and his wife travelled to Egypt via EgyptAir in order to show his confidence in the professionalism of the Egyptian flight crews and airlines, as well as the aircraft they flew.

Metcalf was highly supportive of Congress' commissioning of the Sacagawea dollar. In an interview, he cited how it would aid the economy by lasting for decades, whereas the average $1 bill wears out in about eighteen months from changing hands over four hundred times.

In November 1997, Metcalf was one of eighteen Republicans in the House to co-sponsor a resolution by Bob Barr that sought to launch an impeachment inquiry against President Bill Clinton. The resolution did not specify any charges or allegations. This was an early effort to impeach Clinton, predating the eruption of the Clinton–Lewinsky scandal. The eruption of that scandal would ultimately lead to a more serious effort to impeach Clinton in 1998. On October 8, 1998, Metcalf voted in favor of legislation that was passed to open an impeachment inquiry. On December 19, 1998, Metcalf voted in favor of all four proposed articles of impeachment against Clinton (only two of which received the majority of votes needed to be adopted).

Metcalf died at age 79 at an Alzheimer's care facility in Oak Harbor. He was buried at Bayview Cemetery in Langley, Washington.

== Legacy ==
A number of Metcalf's staff went on to run for or serve in public office, including State Representatives Kirk Pearson (39th leg.), Chris Strow (10th leg.) and Norma Smith (10th leg.). Lew Moore who served as Chief of Staff for much of Metcalf's tenure ran for Snohomish County Executive in 1999 and served as campaign manager for Congressman Ron Paul's 2008 presidential campaign.

On May 8, 2008, the ferry terminal in Clinton was named after Metcalf, in part for his work to secure funding for safety improvements to it while a member of Congress.

== See also ==
- Washington's congressional delegations

Party political offices
Preceded by Richard G. Christensen	Republican nominee for U.S. Senator from Washington (Class 3); 1968, 1974	Succeeded by Slade Gorton
U.S. House of Representatives
Preceded by Al Swift	Member of the U.S. House of Representatives from Washington's 2nd congressional district 1995–2001	Succeeded by Rick Larsen
