= Washington's 10th legislative district =

American legislative district

Coordinates: 48°17′N 122°19′W

Washington 10th legislative district map

Washington's 10th legislative district is one of forty-nine districts in Washington state for representation in the state legislature. The district includes all of Island County, the northwestern tip of Snohomish, and the southwestern part of Skagit counties. Cities in the district include Oak Harbor, Coupeville, Langley, Mount Vernon, La Conner, and Stanwood.

The mostly rural district is represented by state senator Ron Muzzall (R) and state representatives Clyde Shavers (D; position 1), and Dave Paul (D; position 2). It is one of only three legislative districts to currently have a state senator who is from a different political party than either one of their state house members, the others being the 18th and 26th.

== Past legislators ==
=== Statehood-1932 ===
During this period, the state senate and state house districts were geographically distinct.

Year	Senate		House	
Year	Senator	Senate District Geography	House Position 1	House District Geography
1st (1889-1890)	Eugene T. Wilson (R)	Kittitas County		
2nd (1891-1892)	Platt A. Preston (R)	Walla Walla (part)	House District Established	Columbia County
2nd (1891-1892)	Platt A. Preston (R)	Walla Walla (part)	M. M. Godman (D)	Columbia County
3rd (1893-1894)	David Miller (D)	Walla Walla (part)	S. W. Hamill (D)	Columbia County
4th (1895-1896)	David Miller (D)	Walla Walla (part)	Cornelius Lyman (R)	Columbia County
5th (1897-1898)	David Miller (D)	Walla Walla (part)	George Windust (Pop.)	Columbia County
6th (1899-1900)	David Miller (D)	Walla Walla (part)	C. S. Jerard (R)	Columbia County
7th (1901-1902)	W. P. Reser (D)	Walla Walla (part)	C. S. Jerard (R)	Columbia County
8th (1903-1904)	E. Baumeister (R) (Note: Redistricted from the 8th senate district)	Walla Walla (part)	W. L. Howell (D)	Columbia County
9th (1905-1906)	Samuel S. Russell (R) (Note: Deceased May 19, 1905)	Asotin, Columbia, and Garfield counties	W. O. Long (R)	Garfield County
9th (1905-1906)	Vacant (Note: This seat was vacant until 1907, the legislature did not meet while the seat was vacant.)	Asotin, Columbia, and Garfield counties	W. O. Long (R)	Garfield County
10th (1907-1908)	John R. Stevenson (R) (Note: Appointed 1907 to serve unexpired term)	Asotin, Columbia, and Garfield counties	W. O. Long (R)	Garfield County
11th (1909-1910)	John R. Stevenson (R)	Asotin, Columbia, and Garfield counties	Henry C. Krouse (R)	Garfield County
12th (1911-1912)	John R. Stevenson (R)	Asotin, Columbia, and Garfield counties	William James Kelly (R)	Garfield County
13th (1913-1914)	J. C. Weatherford (D)	Asotin, Columbia, and Garfield counties	Clarke G. Black (R)	Garfield County
14th (1915-1916)	J. C. Weatherford (D)	Asotin, Columbia, and Garfield counties	Clarke G. Black (R)	Garfield County
15th (1917-1918)	Elgin V. Kuykendall (R) (Note: Resigned 1919; Appointed to Public Service Commission)	Asotin, Columbia, and Garfield counties	J. T. Ledgerwood (D)	Garfield County
16th (1919-1920)	Elgin V. Kuykendall (R)	Asotin, Columbia, and Garfield counties	J. T. Ledgerwood (D)	Garfield County
16th (1919-1920)	Mack F. Gose (R) (Note: Elected Mar. 17, 1920 to serve 1920 Ex. Session)	Asotin, Columbia, and Garfield counties	J. T. Ledgerwood (D)	Garfield County
17th (1921-1922)	Homer L. Post (R)	Asotin, Columbia, and Garfield counties	Charles M. Baldwin (R)	Garfield County
18th (1923-1924)	Homer L. Post (R)	Asotin, Columbia, and Garfield counties	Charles M. Baldwin (R)	Garfield County
19th (1925-1926)	Homer L. Post (R)	Asotin, Columbia, and Garfield counties	Charles M. Baldwin (R)	Garfield County
20th (1927-1928)	Homer L. Post (R)	Asotin, Columbia, and Garfield counties	C. W. Cotton (D)	Garfield County
21st (1929-1930)	W. A. Frary (R)	Asotin, Columbia, and Garfield counties	Henry C. Krouse (R)	Garfield County
22nd (1931-1932)	W. A. Frary (R)	Asotin, Columbia, and Garfield counties	J. T. Ledgerwood (D)	Garfield County

=== 1933-Present ===
After the passage of Initiative 57 and the 1930 redistricting cycle, the state senate and state house districts were geographically similar. While some senate districts would occasionally be broken up into house seats A and B, seats A and B were always contained in the Senate district boundaries.

The 10th Legislative district's state senate and house seats are identical geographically from 1933 to the present day.

Year	Senate	House		District Geography
Year	Senator	House Position 1	House Position 2	District Geography
23rd (1933-1934)	John F. Worum (D)	J. T. Ledgerwood (D)	Homer L. Post (R)	Asotin, Columbia, Garfield, and Whitman (part)
24th (1935-1936)	John F. Worum (D)	J. T. Ledgerwood (D)	W. F. McCauley (D)	Asotin, Columbia, and Garfield counties
25th (1937-1938)	Howard Roup (D)	W. Newton Fry (D)	J. T. Ledgerwood (D)	Asotin, Columbia, and Garfield counties
26th (1939-1940)	Howard Roup (D)	W. Newton Fry (D)	Alva Ruark (D)	Asotin, Columbia, and Garfield counties
27th (1941-1942)	Charles M. Baldwin (R)	Tracy W. Lyman (R)	Alva Ruark (D)	Asotin, Columbia, and Garfield counties
28th (1943-1944)	Charles M. Baldwin (R)	Henry C. Hartung (R)	Tracy W. Lyman (R)	Asotin, Columbia, and Garfield counties
29th (1945-1946)	Howard Roup (D)	Sidney S. Jeffreys (R)	A. Leroy Weeks (R)	Asotin, Columbia, and Garfield counties
30th (1947-1948)	Howard Roup (D)	Sidney S. Jeffreys (R)	Tracy W. Lyman (R)	Asotin, Columbia, and Garfield counties
31st (1949-1950)	Howard Roup (D)	Dewey C. Donohue (D)	Sidney S. Jeffreys (R)	Asotin, Columbia, and Garfield counties
32nd (1951-1952)	Howard Roup (D)	Dewey C. Donohue (D)	Sidney S. Jeffreys (R)	Asotin, Columbia, and Garfield counties
33rd (1953-1954)	Howard Roup (D)	Dewey C. Donohue (D)	Sidney S. Jeffreys (R)	Asotin, Columbia, and Garfield counties
34th (1955-1956)	Howard Roup (D)	Dewey C. Donohue (D)	Gus Lybecker (R)	Asotin, Columbia, and Garfield counties
35th (1957-1958)	Howard Roup (D)	Dewey C. Donohue (D)	Gus Lybecker (R)	Asotin, Columbia, and Garfield counties
36th (1959-1960)	Howard Roup (D)	Dewey C. Donohue (D)	Position removed in reapportionment	Asotin, Columbia, and Garfield counties
37th (1961-1962)	Dewey C. Donohue (D)	Gus Lybecker (R)		Asotin, Columbia, and Garfield counties
38th (1963-1964)	Dewey C. Donohue (D)	Gus Lybecker (R)		Asotin, Columbia, and Garfield counties
39th (1965-1966)	Dewey C. Donohue (D)	Ben F. Taplin (D)		Asotin, Columbia, and Garfield counties
40th (1967-1968)	Dewey C. Donohue (D)	Charles W. Elicker (R)	Position reestablished	1965 Redistricting
40th (1967-1968)	Dewey C. Donohue (D)	Charles W. Elicker (R)	Pat Wanamaker (R)	Island and Kitsap (part)
41st (1969-1970)	Charles W. Elicker (R)	Pat Wanamaker (R)	Joe Mentor (R)	Island and Kitsap (part)
42nd (1971-1972)	Charles W. Elicker (R)	Pat Wanamaker (R)	Joe Mentor (R)	Island and Kitsap (part)
43rd (1973-1974)	Pat Wanamaker (R)	Simeon R. Wilson (R)	Eleanor A. Fortson (D)	1972 Redistricting
43rd (1973-1974)	Pat Wanamaker (R)	Simeon R. Wilson (R)	Eleanor A. Fortson (D)	Island and Snohomish (part)
44th (1975-1976)	Pat Wanamaker (R)	Simeon R. Wilson (R)	Eleanor A. Fortson (D)	Island and Snohomish (part)
45th (1977-1978)	Pat Wanamaker (R)	Simeon R. Wilson (R)	Eleanor A. Fortson (D)	Island and Snohomish (part)
46th (1979-1980)	Pat Wanamaker (R)	Simeon R. Wilson (R)	Joan Houchen (R)	Island and Snohomish (part)
47th (1981-1982)	Jack Metcalf (R)	Simeon R. Wilson (R)	Joan Houchen (R)	Island and Snohomish (part)
48th (1983-1984)	Jack Metcalf (R)	Simeon R. Wilson (R)	Mary Margaret Haugen (D)	Island, Skagit (part), Snohomish (part)
49th (1985-1986)	Jack Metcalf (R)	Simeon R. Wilson (R)	Mary Margaret Haugen (D)	Island, Skagit (part), Snohomish (part)
50th (1987-1988)	Jack Metcalf (R)	Simeon R. Wilson (R)	Mary Margaret Haugen (D)	Island, Skagit (part), Snohomish (part)
51st (1989-1990)	Jack Metcalf (R)	Simeon R. Wilson (R)	Mary Margaret Haugen (D)	Island, Skagit (part), Snohomish (part)
52nd (1991-1992)	Jack Metcalf (R)	Simeon R. Wilson (R)	Mary Margaret Haugen (D)	Island, Skagit (part), Snohomish (part)
53rd (1993-1994)	Mary Margaret Haugen (D)	Sue Karahalios (D)	Barry Sehlin (R)	Island, Skagit (part), Snohomish (part)
54th (1995-1996)	Mary Margaret Haugen (D)	Barney Beeksma (R)	Barry Sehlin (R)	Island, Skagit (part), Snohomish (part)
55th (1997-1998)	Mary Margaret Haugen (D)	Dave Anderson (D)	Barry Sehlin (R)	Island, Skagit (part), Snohomish (part)
56th (1999-2000)	Mary Margaret Haugen (D)	Dave Anderson (D)	Kelly Barlean (R)	Island, Skagit (part), Snohomish (part)
57th (2001-2002)	Mary Margaret Haugen (D)	Barry Sehlin (R)	Kelly Barlean (R)	Island, Skagit (part), Snohomish (part)
58th (2003-2004)	Mary Margaret Haugen (D)	Barry Sehlin (R)	Barbara Bailey (R)	Island, Skagit (part), Snohomish (part)
59th (2005-2006)	Mary Margaret Haugen (D)	Chris Strow (R) (Note: Resigned Dec. 12, 2007; Named analyst for the Puget Sound Regional Council)	Barbara Bailey (R)	Island, Skagit (part), Snohomish (part)
60th (2007-2008)	Mary Margaret Haugen (D)	Chris Strow (R)	Barbara Bailey (R)	Island, Skagit (part), Snohomish (part)
60th (2007-2008)	Mary Margaret Haugen (D)	Norma Smith (R) (Note: Appointed Jan. 8, 2008 to serve unexpired term)	Barbara Bailey (R)	Island, Skagit (part), Snohomish (part)
61st (2009-2010)	Mary Margaret Haugen (D)	Norma Smith (R)	Barbara Bailey (R)	Island, Skagit (part), Snohomish (part)
62nd (2011-2012)	Mary Margaret Haugen (D)	Norma Smith (R)	Barbara Bailey (R)	Island, Skagit (part), Snohomish (part)
63rd (2013-2014)	Barbara Bailey (R) (Note: Resigned Sept. 30, 2019)	Norma Smith (R)	Dave Hayes (R)	Island, Skagit (part), Snohomish (part)
64th (2015-2016)	Barbara Bailey (R)	Norma Smith (R)	Dave Hayes (R)	Island, Skagit (part), Snohomish (part)
65th (2017-2018)	Barbara Bailey (R)	Norma Smith (R)	Dave Hayes (R)	Island, Skagit (part), Snohomish (part)
66th (2019-2020)	Barbara Bailey (R)	Norma Smith (R)	Dave Paul (D)	Island, Skagit (part), Snohomish (part)
66th (2019-2020)	Ron Muzzall (R) (Note: Appointed Oct. 18, 2019; Elected Nov. 3, 2020 to serve unexpired term)	Norma Smith (R)	Dave Paul (D)	Island, Skagit (part), Snohomish (part)
67th (2021-2022)	Ron Muzzall (R)	Greg Gilday (R)	Dave Paul (D)	Island, Skagit (part), Snohomish (part)
68th (2023-2024)	Ron Muzzall (R)	Clyde Shavers (D)	Dave Paul (D)	Island, Skagit (part), Snohomish (part)
69th (2025-2026)	Ron Muzzall (R)	Clyde Shavers (D)	Dave Paul (D)	Island, Skagit (part), Snohomish (part)

== Key ==
Democratic (D)
Populist (Pop)
Progressive (Bull Moose) (Prog)
Republican (R)

== See also ==
- Washington Redistricting Commission
- Washington State Legislature
- Washington State Senate
- Washington House of Representatives
- Washington (state) legislative districts
