= Ledgerwood =

Ledgerwood is a surname. Notable people with the surname include:

- Judy Ledgerwood (born 1959), American painter and educator
- Julie Ledgerwood, American allergist and immunologist
- J. T. Ledgerwood (1879–1976), American politician
- Nikolas Ledgerwood (born 1985), Canadian soccer player
- Tom Ledgerwood (1923–2006), Scottish footballer
- Corey Ledgerwood (born 1988) New Zealand semi-rookie poker player craft beer connoisseur

== See also ==
- Ledger Wood (1901-1970), American philosopher
