= Norma Smith =

American politician from Washington

Member of the Washington House of Representatives from the 10th, Position 1 district
- In office January 8, 2008 – January 11, 2021
- Preceded by: Chris Strow
- Succeeded by: Greg Gilday

Personal details
- Born: Norma Ruth Creighton; October 8, 1951 (age 74) Pensacola, Florida, U.S.
- Party: Republican
- Education: Pensacola Junior College, Puget Sound Christian College
- Profession: Congressional assistant Director of Operations; Program director Director of communications Operations Manager
- Website: Official

Norma Ruth Smith (née Creighton; born October 8, 1951) is an American politician of the Republican Party. She was a member of the Washington House of Representatives, representing the 10th Legislative District from 2008 to 2021.

== Education ==
In 1971, Smith earned an A.A. degree from Pensacola Junior College. In 2000, Smith earned a Bachelor of Arts degree in theology from Puget Sound Christian College.

== Career ==
Smith was an aide to Republican U.S. Representative Jack Metcalf from 1994 to 2000, and was a member of the South Whidbey School Board from 1991 to 1995, serving as president in 1994. She unsuccessfully ran against Democratic State Senator Mary Margaret Haugen in 2000 and Democratic U.S. Representative Rick Larsen in 2002. Smith was appointed to the state House in 2008 to fill a vacant seat. Her district, the 10th Legislative District, encompasses all of Island County, a portion of northwestern Snohomish County, and a southwestern portion of Skagit County. She was subsequently reelected. In the state House, Smith obtained a bipartisan reputation and was known as a prominent supporter of data privacy legislation.

Smith announced in March 2020 that she would not seek reelection to a seventh term in office.

== Awards ==
- 2020 Guardians of Small Business. Presented by NFIB.

== Personal life ==
Smith's husband was Stephen. They have four children. Smith and her family live in Clinton, Washington.
