= 1974 United States Senate election in Washington =

- November 5, 1974
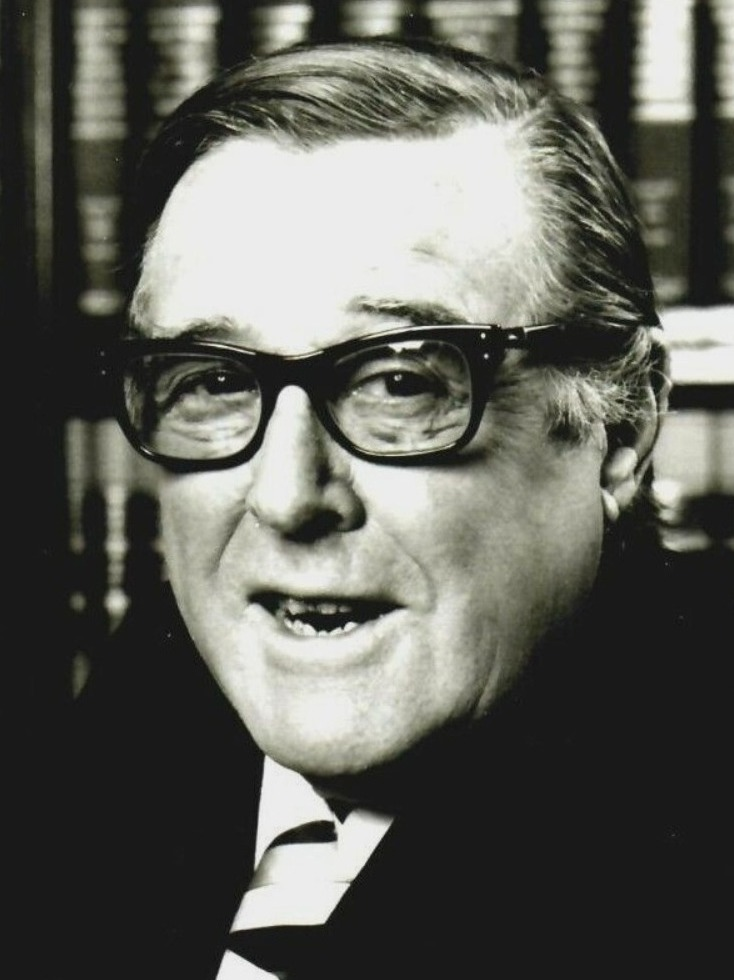

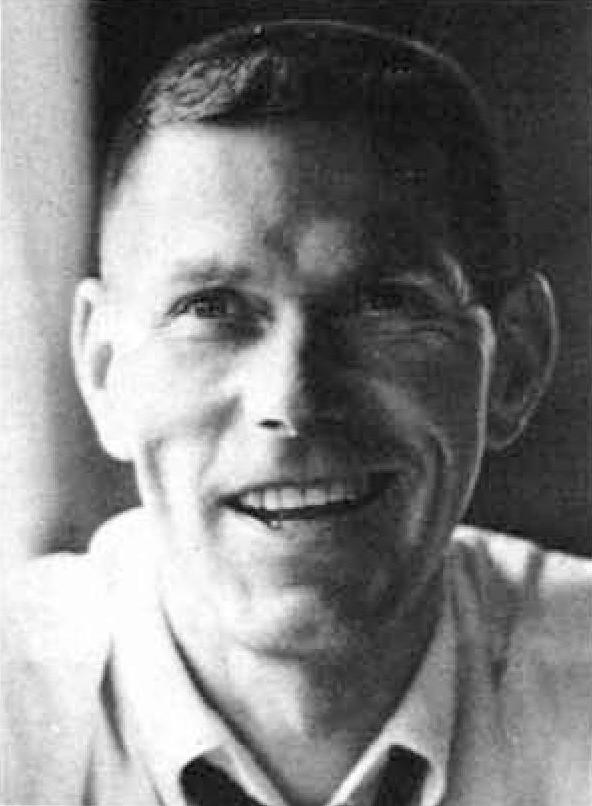
Nominee	Warren Magnuson	Jack Metcalf
Party	Democratic	Republican
Popular vote	611,811	363,626
Percentage	60.70%	36.08%
- County results Magnuson: 40–50% 50–60% 60–70% 70–80% Metcalf: 40–50% 50–60%
U.S. senator before election
Warren G. Magnuson
Democratic
Elected U.S. Senator
Warren G. Magnuson
Democratic

The 1974 United States Senate election in Washington was held on November 5, 1974. Incumbent Democratic U.S. Senator Warren Magnuson won a sixth term in office, defeating Republican state senator Jack Metcalf, in a rematch of the previous election.

== Blanket primary ==
The blanket primary was held on September 17, 1974.

=== Candidates ===
==== Democratic ====
- Warren G. Magnuson, incumbent United States senator
- John "Hugo Frye" Patric, writer

==== Republican ====
- Jesse Chiang
- Donald C. Knutson
- James H. Liedke
- Jack Metcalf, state senator
- June Riggs
- Richard E. Van Horn

=== Results ===
Blanket primary results
Party	Candidate	Votes	%
Democratic	Warren G. Magnuson (incumbent)	288,038	59.84%
Republican	Jack Metcalf	103,616	21.53%
Republican	Jesse Chiang	31,193	6.48%
Democratic	John Patric	23,438	4.87%
Republican	Donald C. Knutson	13,738	2.85%
Republican	June Riggs	8,491	1.76%
Republican	Richard E. Van Horn	7,840	1.63%
Republican	James H. Liedke	4,989	1.04%
Total votes		481,343	100.00%

== Candidates ==
=== Democratic ===
- Warren Magnuson, incumbent U.S. senator

=== Republican ===
- Jack Metcalf, state senator

== Results ==
1974 United States Senate election in Washington
Party	Candidate	Votes	%
Democratic	Warren Magnuson (incumbent)	611,811	60.70
Republican	Jack Metcalf	363,626	36.08
American Independent	Gene Goosman	19,871	1.97
Socialist Workers	Clare Fraenzl	8,176	0.81
U.S. Labor	Pat Ruckert	4,363	0.43
Majority		248,185	24.62
Turnout		1,007,847	
Democratic hold			

== See also ==
- 1974 United States Senate elections
