= Senator Gould (disambiguation) =

Arthur R. Gould (1857–1946) was a U.S. Senator from Maine from 1926 to 1931. Senator Gould may also refer to:

- Candace Gould (fl. 2010s–2020s), New Mexico State Senate
- Ron Gould (politician) (born 1965), Arizona State Senate
- Susan Gould (1929–2017), Washington State Senate
