= Charette (disambiguation) =

Charette may refer to:

== Places ==
- Charette, Isère, a commune of the Isère département, France
- Charette, Quebec
- Charette-Varennes

== People with the surname ==
- Alex Charette (born 1992), African-Canadian football player
- Benoit Charette (born 1976), Canadian politician
- Brian Charette (born 1972), American organist
- Christiane Charette (born 1951), Canadian radio host
- François de Charette (1763–1796), French chief of the counter-revolutionary insurrection
- Hervé de Charette (born 1938), French politician
- Janice Charette (born 1962), Canadian diplomat
- Manon Charette (1955–2006), Canadian handball player
- Marie Charette-Poulin (born 1945), Canadian politician
- Monik Charette (born 1957), Canadian linguist
- Pierre Charette (born 1955), Canadian curler
- Robert L. Charette (1923–1988), American politician
- William R. Charette (1932–2012), Medal of Honor recipient for his actions during the Korean War

== See also ==
- Charrette (disambiguation)
- Charrette, an intense period of design or planning
