= 1962 United States Senate election in Washington =

- November 6, 1962
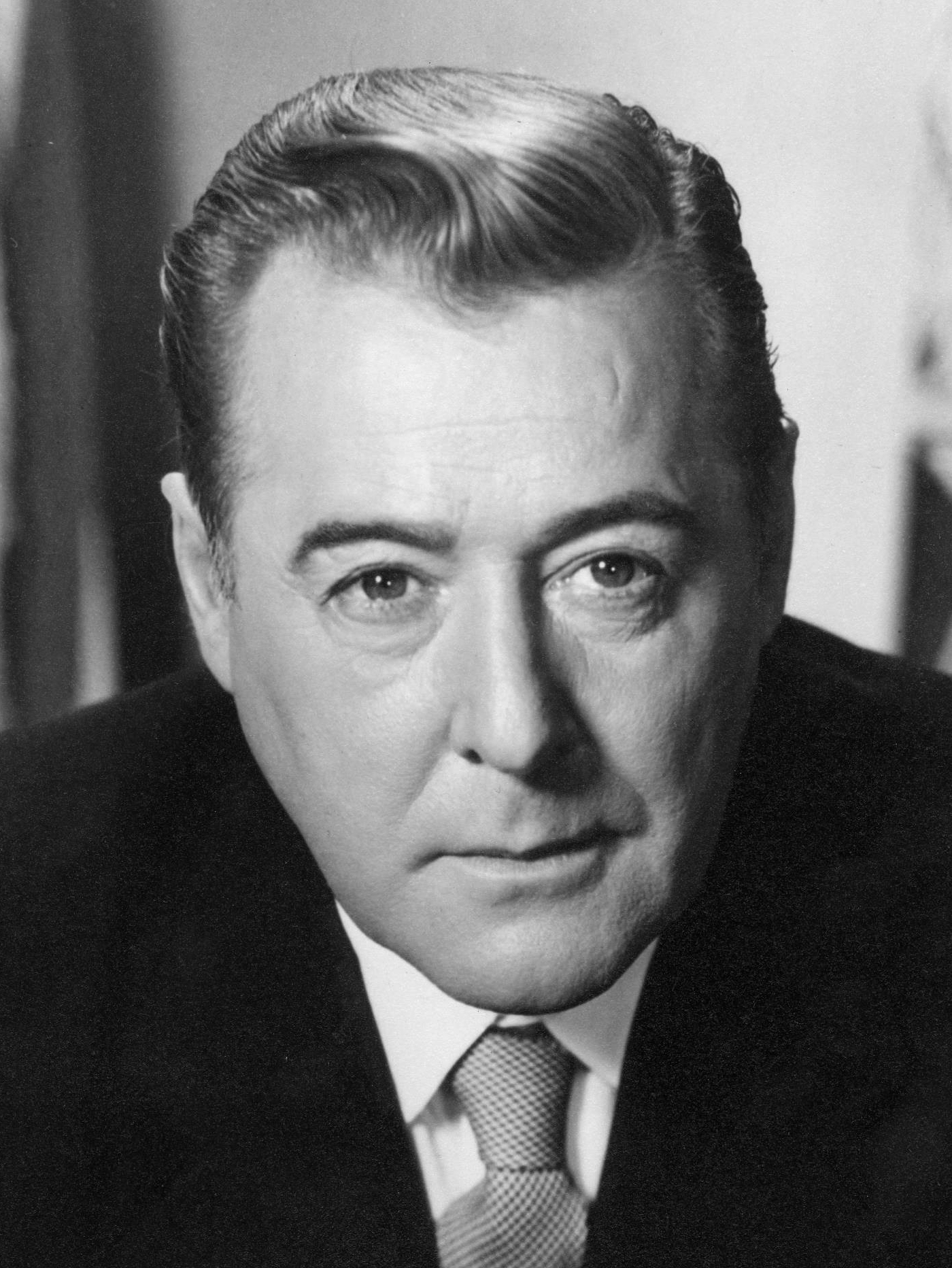

Nominee	Warren Magnuson	Richard G. Christensen
Party	Democratic	Republican
Popular vote	491,365	446,204
Percentage	52.09%	47.31%
- County results Magnuson: 50–60% 60–70% Christensen: 40–50% 50–60% 60–70%
U.S. senator before election
Warren Magnuson
Democratic
Elected U.S. Senator
Warren Magnuson
Democratic

The 1962 United States Senate election in Washington was held on November 6, 1962. Incumbent Democratic U.S. Senator Warren Magnuson won a fourth term in office, narrowly defeating Republican nominee Richard G. Christensen.

== Blanket primary ==
The blanket primary was held on September 18, 1962.

=== Candidates ===
==== Democratic ====
- Warren G. Magnuson, incumbent United States Senator
- John "Hugo Frye" Patric, writer

==== Republican ====
- Richard G. Christensen, Lutheran minister
- Ben Larson, teacher

=== Results ===
Blanket primary results
Party	Candidate	Votes	%
Democratic	Warren G. Magnuson (incumbent)	280,891	54.32%
Republican	Richard G. Christensen	178,616	34.54%
Republican	Ben Larson	38,759	7.50%
Democratic	John Patric	18,849	3.65%
Total votes		517,115	100.00%

== General election ==
=== Candidates ===
- Warren Magnuson, Democratic, incumbent U.S. Senator
- Richard G. Christensen, Republican
- W. Frank Horne, Constitution, candidate for Washington's 6th congressional district in 1958
- Henry M. Killman, Socialist Labor, perennial candidate

=== Results ===
1962 United States Senate election in Washington
Party	Candidate	Votes	%
Democratic	Warren G. Magnuson (Incumbent)	491,365	52.09
Republican	Richard G. Christensen	446,204	47.31
Socialist Labor	Henry Killman	4,730	0.50
Constitution	W. Frank Horne	930	0.10
Majority		45,161	4.78
Turnout		943,229	
Democratic hold			

== See also ==
- 1962 United States Senate elections

== Bibliography ==
- Congressional Elections, 1946-1996. Washington, D.C.: Congressional Quarterly Inc. 1998. ISBN 1-56802-248-4.
- Scammon, Richard M., ed. (1964). America Votes 5: a handbook of contemporary American election statistics, 1962. Washington, D.C.: Governmental Affairs Institute.
