= Greg Gilday =

American politician from Washington

Member of the Washington House of Representatives from the 10th district
- In office January 11, 2021 – January 9, 2023
- Preceded by: Norma Smith
- Succeeded by: Clyde Shavers

Personal details
- Born: 1977 (age 48–49) Stanwood, Washington, U.S.
- Party: Republican
- Children: 2
- Education: Western Washington University, Seattle University
- Occupation: Politician, attorney

Gregory L. Gilday (born 1977) is an American attorney, businessman, and politician formerly serving as a member of the Washington House of Representatives from the 10th district. He was elected in November 2020 and assumed office on January 11, 2021.

== Background ==
Gilday was born in Stanwood, Washington. He earned a Bachelor of Arts degree in economics from Western Washington University, a Master of Business Administration from Seattle University, and a Juris Doctor from the Seattle University School of Law. Prior to entering office, Gilday worked as an attorney and real estate broker. Gilday lives on Camano Island with his wife and two sons.
