= 1944 United States Senate election in Washington =

- November 7, 1944
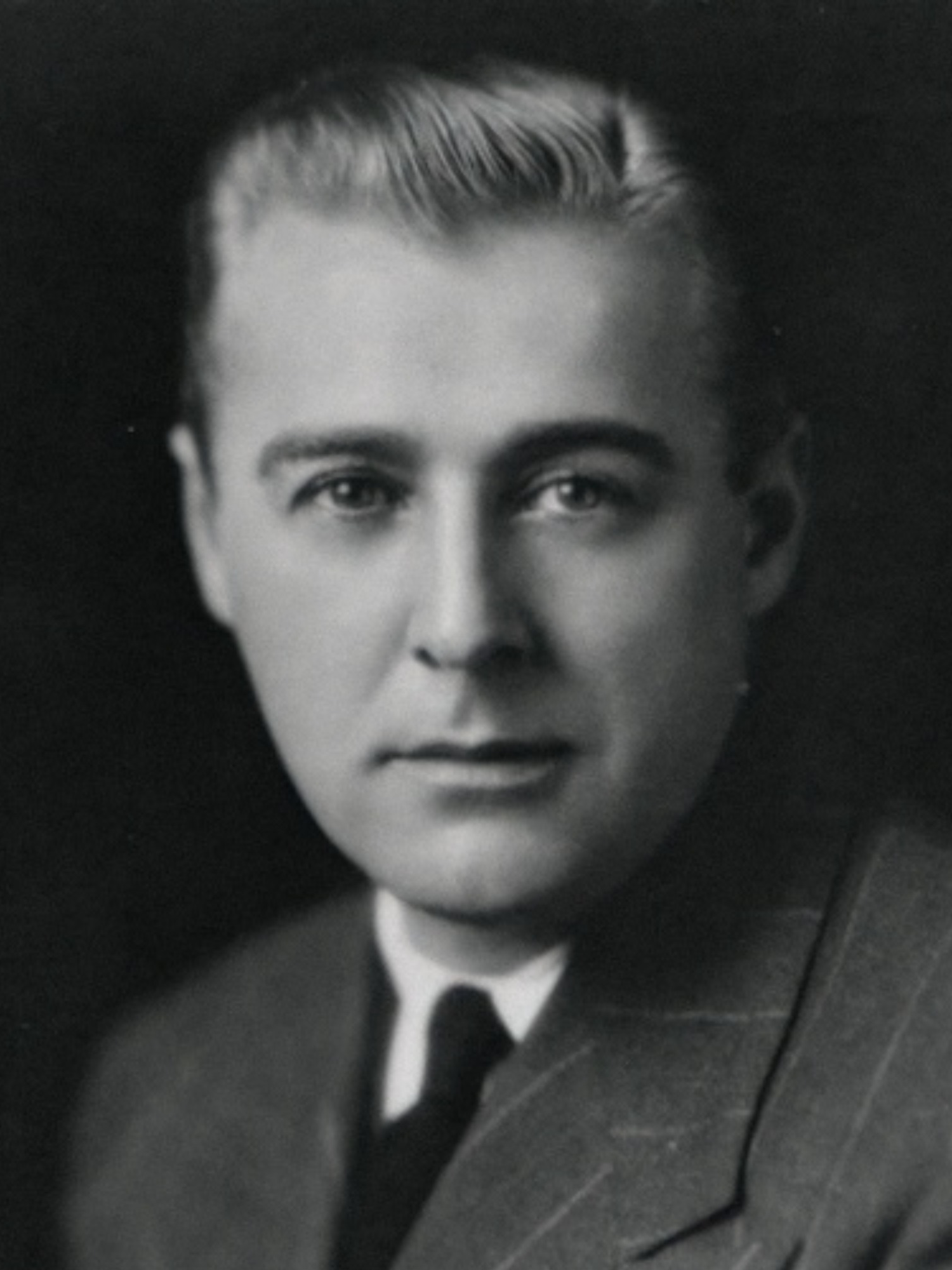

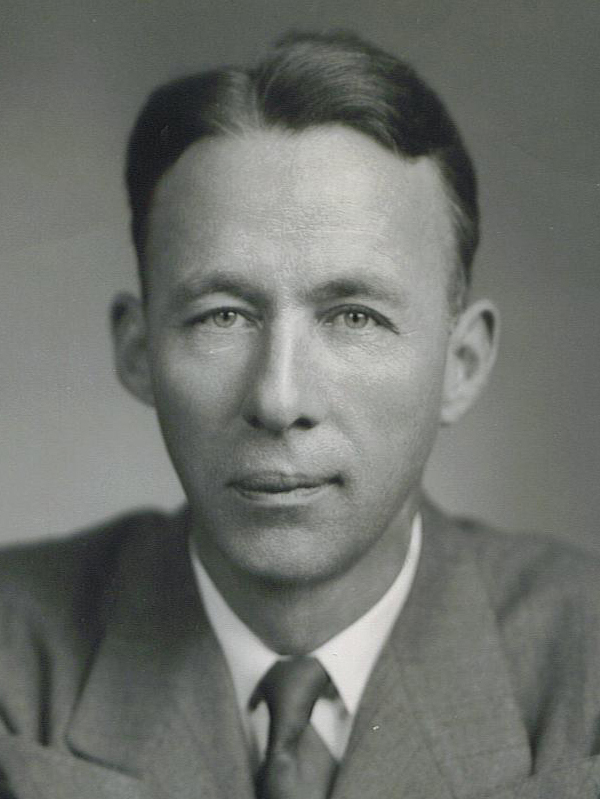
Nominee	Warren Magnuson	Harry P. Cain
Party	Democratic	Republican
Popular vote	397,719	342,464
Percentage	55.13%	44.44%
- County results Magnuson: 50–60% 60–70% Cain: 50–60% 60–70%
U.S. senator before election
Homer Bone (Note: Bone resigned from office on April 1 to take his commission as a federal judge on the Ninth Circuit Court of Appeals.)
Democratic
Elected U.S. Senator
Warren Magnuson
Democratic

The 1944 United States Senate election in Washington was held on November 7, 1944. Incumbent Democratic U.S. Senator Homer Bone resigned in April, having been appointed and confirmed to the United States Court of Appeals for the Ninth Circuit in April. Democratic U.S. Representative Warren Magnuson won the open race over Republican mayor of Tacoma Harry Cain and was appointed to the vacant seat.

== Blanket primary ==
The blanket primary was held on July 11, 1944.

=== Candidates ===
==== Democratic ====
- John A. Hogg
- Warren G. Magnuson, U.S. Representative from Seattle since 1937
- Martin F. Smith, former U.S. Representative from Hoquiam (1933–1943)

==== Republican ====
- Stella Alene Blanchard, candidate for U.S. House from Goldendale in 1942
- Harry P. Cain, Mayor of Tacoma since 1940
- Gordon B. Dodd
- J. Parkhurst Douglas
- Howard E. Foster, candidate for U.S. Senate in 1938 and 1940
- Joseph A. Mallery, Justice of the Washington Supreme Court
- Charles Arlin Nave
- Clement L. Niswonger
- Edwin L. Rice
- Cameron Sherwood, candidate for U.S. House from Walla Walla in 1942
- Herb Sieler, nominee for U.S. House from Chehalis in 1936

=== Results ===
Blanket primary results
Party	Candidate	Votes	%
Democratic	Warren G. Magnuson	118,586	34.86%
Republican	Harry P. Cain	67,350	19.80%
Republican	Cameron Sherwood	51,700	15.20%
Democratic	Martin F. Smith	25,605	7.53%
Republican	Joseph A. Mallery	18,364	5.40%
Republican	Herb Sieler	17,383	5.11%
Democratic	John A. Hogg	10,091	2.97%
Republican	Stella Alene Blanchard	6,191	1.82%
Republican	Howard E. Foster	6,140	1.80%
Republican	Gordon B. Dodd	5,393	1.59%
Republican	J. Parkhurst Douglas	4,330	1.27%
Republican	Edwin L. Rice	3,633	1.07%
Republican	Charles Arlin Nave	3,327	0.98%
Republican	Clement L. Niswonger	2,123	0.62%
Total votes		340,216	100.00%

== General election ==
=== Candidates ===
- Harry P. Cain, Mayor of Tacoma (Republican)
- Warren Magnuson, U.S. Representative from Seattle (Democratic)
- Ray C. Roberts (Socialist)
- Josephine B. Sulston (Prohibition)

=== Results ===
1944 United States Senate election in Washington
Party	Candidate	Votes	%
Democratic	Warren G. Magnuson	452,013	55.13%
Republican	Harry P. Cain	364,356	44.44%
Socialist	Ray C. Roberts	1,912	0.23%
Prohibition	Josephine B. Sulston	1,598	0.20%
Total votes		819,879	100.00%
Democratic hold			

After the election, Governor Arthur B. Langlie appointed Magnuson to the vacant seat left by Bone's resignation, and he took office on December 14.

Cain would win election to Washington's other Senate seat in 1946 and served alongside Magnuson from 1947 to 1953.

== See also ==
- 1944 United States Senate elections
