= Barry Sehlin =

American politician

Member of the Washington House of Representatives from the 10th district Position 1
- In office January 8, 2001 – January 10, 2005
- Preceded by: Dave Anderson
- Succeeded by: Chris Strow

Member of the Washington House of Representatives from the 10th district Position 2
- In office January 11, 1993 – January 11, 1999
- Preceded by: Mary Margaret Haugen
- Succeeded by: Kelly Barlean

Personal details
- Born: December 27, 1942 (age 83) Minneapolis, Minnesota
- Party: Republican

Barry Sehlin (born December 27, 1942) is an American politician who served in the Washington House of Representatives from the 10th district from 1993 to 1999 and from 2001 to 2005.
