= 1950 United States Senate election in Washington =

- November 7, 1950
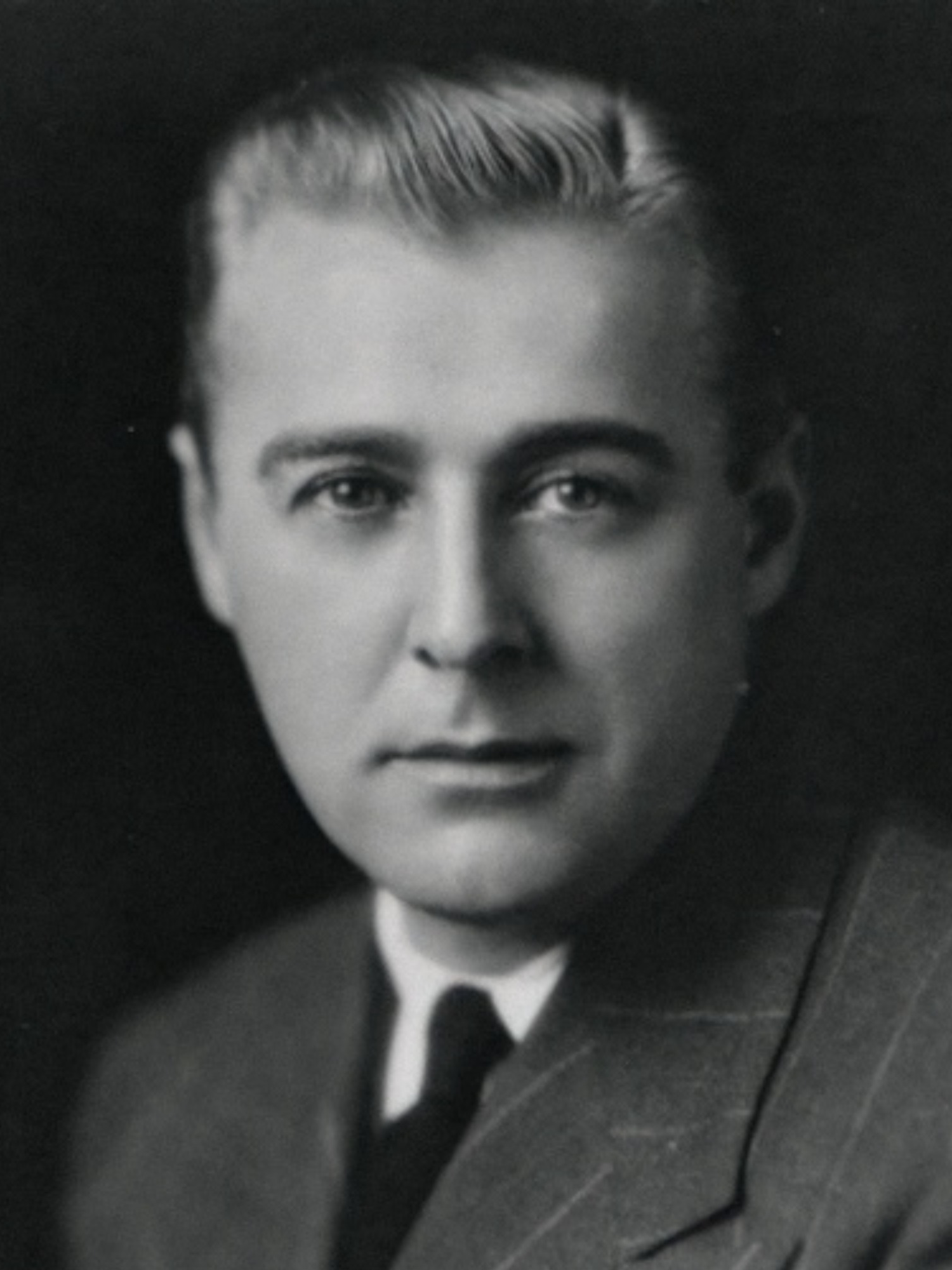

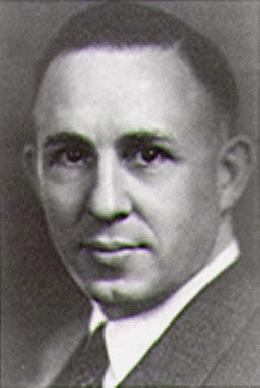
Nominee	Warren Magnuson	W. Walter Williams
Party	Democratic	Republican
Popular vote	397,719	342,464
Percentage	53.40%	45.98%
- County results Magnuson: 50–60% 60–70% Williams: 50–60% 60–70%
U.S. senator before election
Warren Magnuson
Democratic
Elected U.S. Senator
Warren Magnuson
Democratic

The 1950 United States Senate election in Washington was held on November 7, 1950. Incumbent Democratic U.S. Senator Warren Magnuson won a second term in office, defeating Republican nominee W. Walter Williams.

== Blanket primary ==
The blanket primary was held on September 12, 1950.

=== Candidates ===
==== Democratic ====
- Warren G. Magnuson, incumbent United States Senator

==== Republican ====
- Albert Franklyn Canwell, Member from the Washington House of Representatives' 5th District
- Carl Viking Holman
- George Kinnear
- Janet Tourtellotte, GOP committeewoman
- W. Walter Williams, CEO of Continental Mortgage

=== Results ===
Blanket primary results
Party	Candidate	Votes	%
Democratic	Warren G. Magnuson (incumbent)	212,578	46.37%
Republican	W. Walter Williams	83,871	18.30%
Republican	Albert Franklyn Canwell	63,214	13.79%
Republican	Janet Tourtellotte	44,055	9.61%
Republican	George Kinnear	38,822	8.47%
Republican	Carl Viking Holman	15,891	3.46%
Total votes		458,439	100.00%

== General election ==
=== Candidates ===
- Warren Magnuson, Democratic, incumbent U.S. Senator
- W. Walter Williams, Republican, CEO of Continental Mortgage

=== Results ===
1950 United States Senate election in Washington
Party	Candidate	Votes	%
Democratic	Warren G. Magnuson (incumbent)	397,719	53.40
Republican	W. Walter Williams	342,464	45.98
Majority		55,255	7.42
Turnout		744,792	
Democratic hold			

== See also ==
- 1950 United States Senate elections
