= 1956 United States Senate election in Washington =

- November 6, 1956
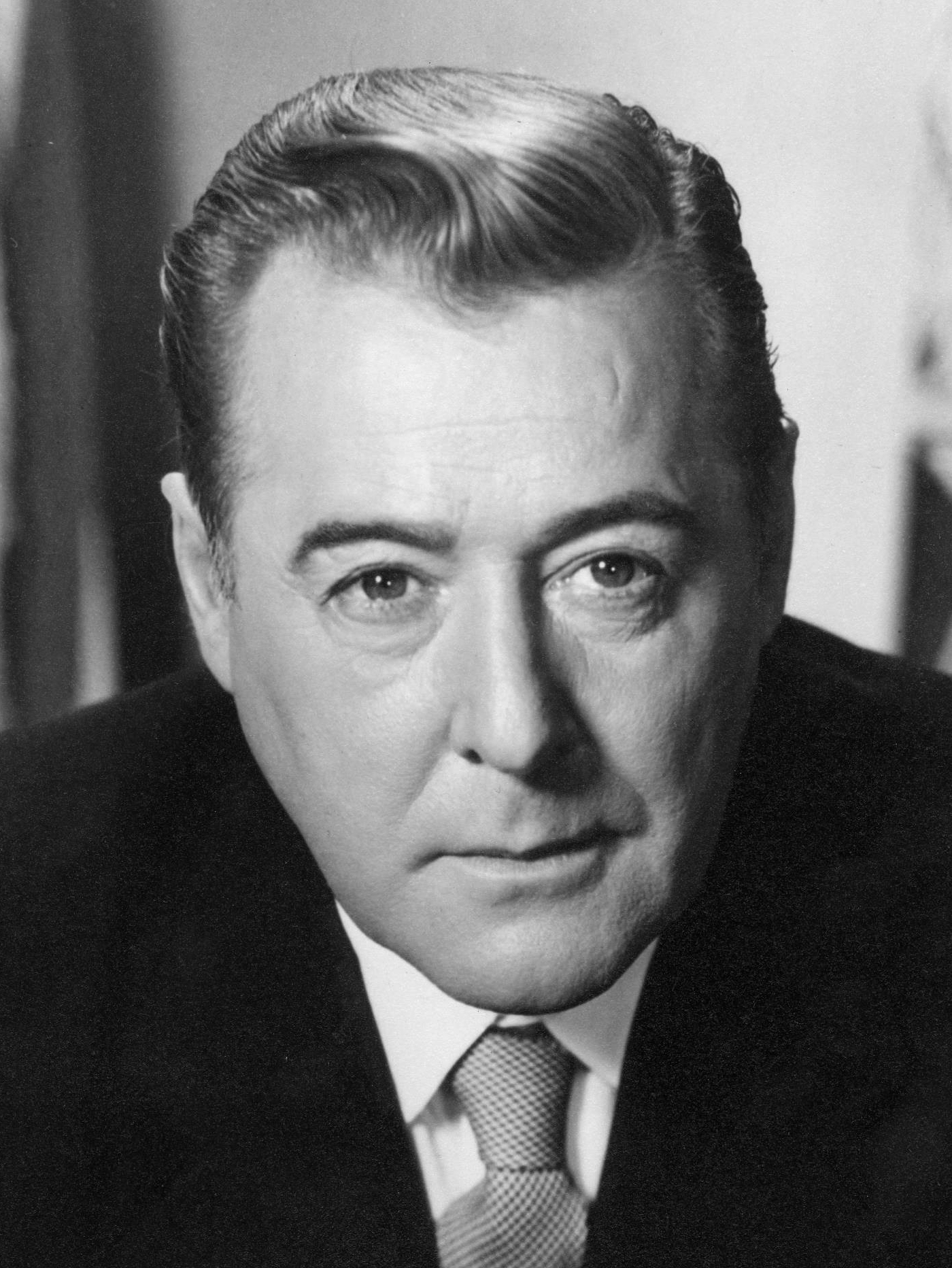

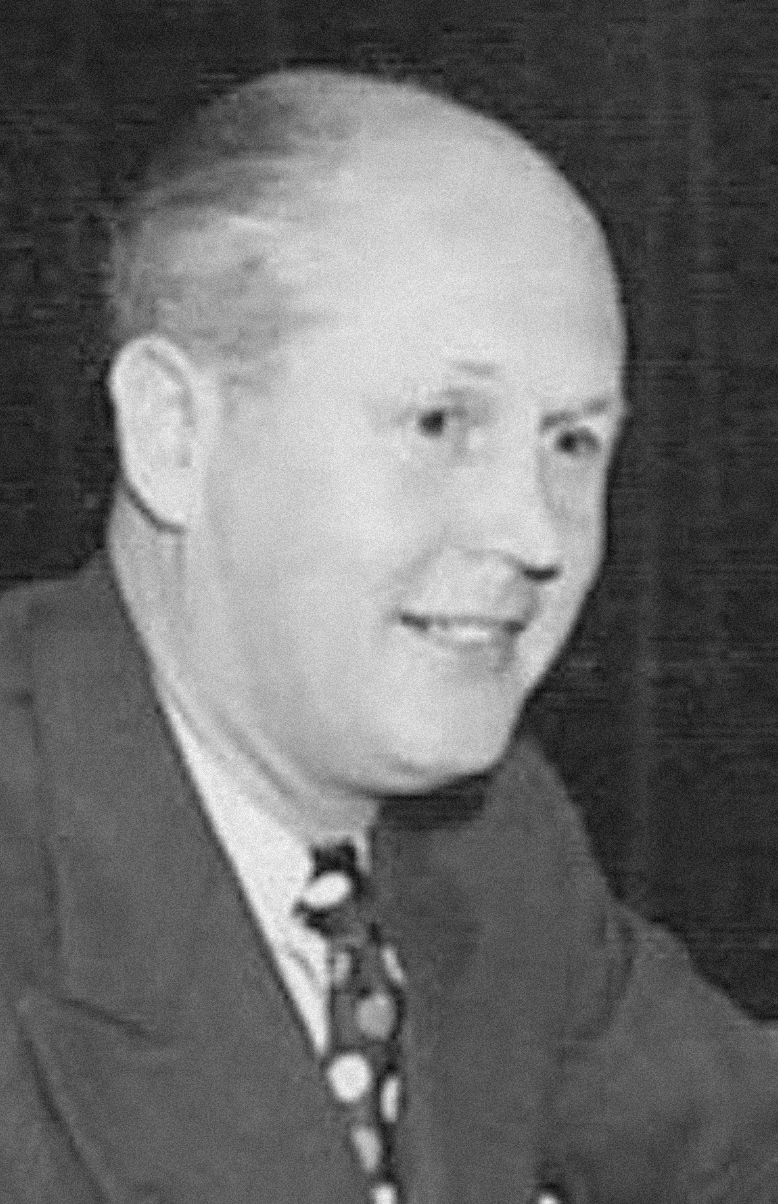
Nominee	Warren Magnuson	Arthur B. Langlie
Party	Democratic	Republican
Popular vote	685,565	436,652
Percentage	61.09%	38.91%
- County results Magnuson: 50–60% 60–70% 70–80%
U.S. senator before election
Warren Magnuson
Democratic
Elected U.S. Senator
Warren Magnuson
Democratic

The 1956 United States Senate election in Washington was held on November 6, 1956. Incumbent Democratic U.S. Senator Warren Magnuson won a third term in office, defeating Republican nominee Arthur B. Langlie.

== Blanket primary ==
The blanket primary was held on September 11, 1956.

=== Candidates ===
==== Democratic ====
- Warren G. Magnuson, incumbent United States senator

==== Republican ====
- Arthur B. Langlie, governor of Washington

=== Results ===
Blanket primary results
Party	Candidate	Votes	%
Democratic	Warren G. Magnuson (incumbent)	442,761	60.48%
Republican	Arthur B. Langlie	289,302	39.52%
Total votes		732,063	100.00%

== General election ==
=== Candidates ===
- Arthur B. Langlie, Republican, governor of Washington
- Warren Magnuson, Democratic, incumbent U.S. senator

=== Results ===
1956 United States Senate election in Washington
Party	Candidate	Votes	%
Democratic	Warren G. Magnuson (incumbent)	685,565	61.09
Republican	Arthur B. Langlie	436,652	38.91
Majority		248,913	22.18
Turnout		1,122,217	
Democratic hold			

== See also ==
- 1956 United States Senate elections

== Bibliography ==
- Congressional Elections, 1946-1996. Washington, D.C.: Congressional Quarterly Inc. 1998. ISBN 1-56802-248-4.
- Scammon, Richard M., ed. (1964). America Votes 5: a handbook of contemporary American election statistics, 1962. Washington, D.C.: Governmental Affairs Institute.
