= Charrette (disambiguation) =

A charrette (or charette or design charrette) is a term describing a period of intense design activity, often immediately preceding a deadline.

Charrette may also refer to:

- Charrette, the French word for cart
- La Charrette, the smallest cinema in the UK, built from a disused railway carriage
- "Lancelot, the Knight of the Cart" or "Lancelot, le Chevalier de la Charrette", an Old French poem by Chrétien de Troyes

== See also ==
- Charette (disambiguation)
