= Dick King (politician) =

American politician and educator (1934–2018)

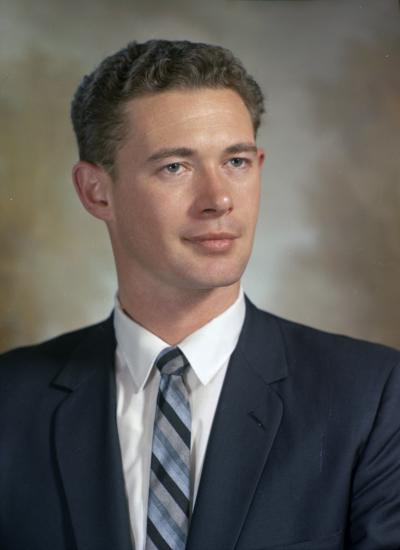
- King in 1967

Majority Leader of the Washington House of Representatives
- In office January 10, 1977 – January 12, 1981
- Preceded by: Robert L. Charette
- Succeeded by: Gary A. Nelson

Minority Leader of the Washington House of Representatives
- In office January 12, 1981 – January 11, 1982
- Preceded by: Duane Berentson
- Succeeded by: Wayne Ehlers

Member of the Washington House of Representatives from the 38th district
- In office January 11, 1965 – January 9, 1995
- Preceded by: Jack Metcalf
- Succeeded by: Jeralita “Jeri” Costa

Personal details
- Born: August 30, 1934 Ritzville, Washington, U.S.
- Died: January 15, 2018 (aged 83) Port Angeles, Washington, U.S.
- Party: Democratic
- Spouse: Mary King
- Education: University of Washington (BA, MA)
- Profession: Teacher

Richard A. King (August 30, 1934 – January 15, 2018) was an American educator and politician in the state of Washington.

King was born in Ritzville, Washington, and attended the University of Washington, attaining B.A. and M.A. degrees. King was also an educator, serving as a faculty member of the Everett Community College for 31 years until this retirement in the 1990s. A Democrat, King represented the 38th district in the Washington State House, which included parts of Snohomish County. From 1965 to 1994, he served 15 consecutive terms. He and his wife Mary had 4 children.

He died on January 15, 2018.
