= Joan Houchen =

American politician

Member of the Washington House of Representatives from the 10th district
- In office 1979–1983
- Succeeded by: Mary Margaret Haugen

Personal details
- Born: July 13, 1930 Minneapolis, Minnesota
- Died: August 30, 2020 (aged 90)
- Party: Republican
- Education: University of Washington

Joan Carol Houchen (née Gildemeister; July 13, 1930 – August 30, 2020) was an American politician. She was a Republican, and represented District 10 in the Washington House of Representatives which included parts of Snohomish County and Island County, from 1979 to 1983. Houchen was born in Minnesota and raised in Montana. Houchen and her husband raised their two children on their small farm on Camano Island. In the 1982 United States House of Representatives elections, she was a candidate in Washington's 2nd congressional district.
