= Cornelius Lyman =

American politician

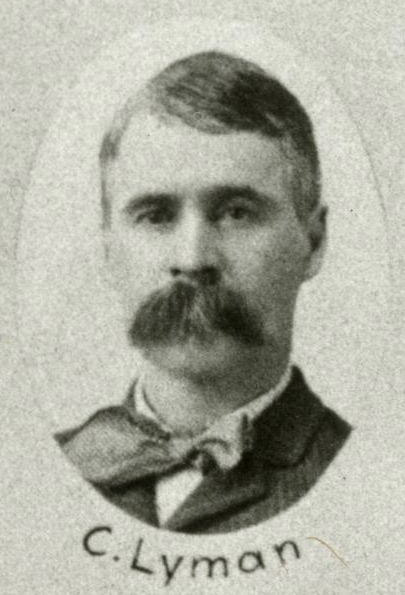
- Lyman in 1895

Member of the Washington House of Representatives for the 10th district
- In office 1895–1897

Personal details
- Born: October 14, 1846 Farmington, Illinois, United States
- Died: June 16, 1926 (aged 79) Dayton, Washington, United States
- Party: Republican

Cornelius Lyman (October 14, 1846 – June 16, 1926) was an American politician in the state of Washington. He served in the Washington House of Representatives from 1895 to 1897.
