= 1968 United States Senate election in Washington =

- November 5, 1968
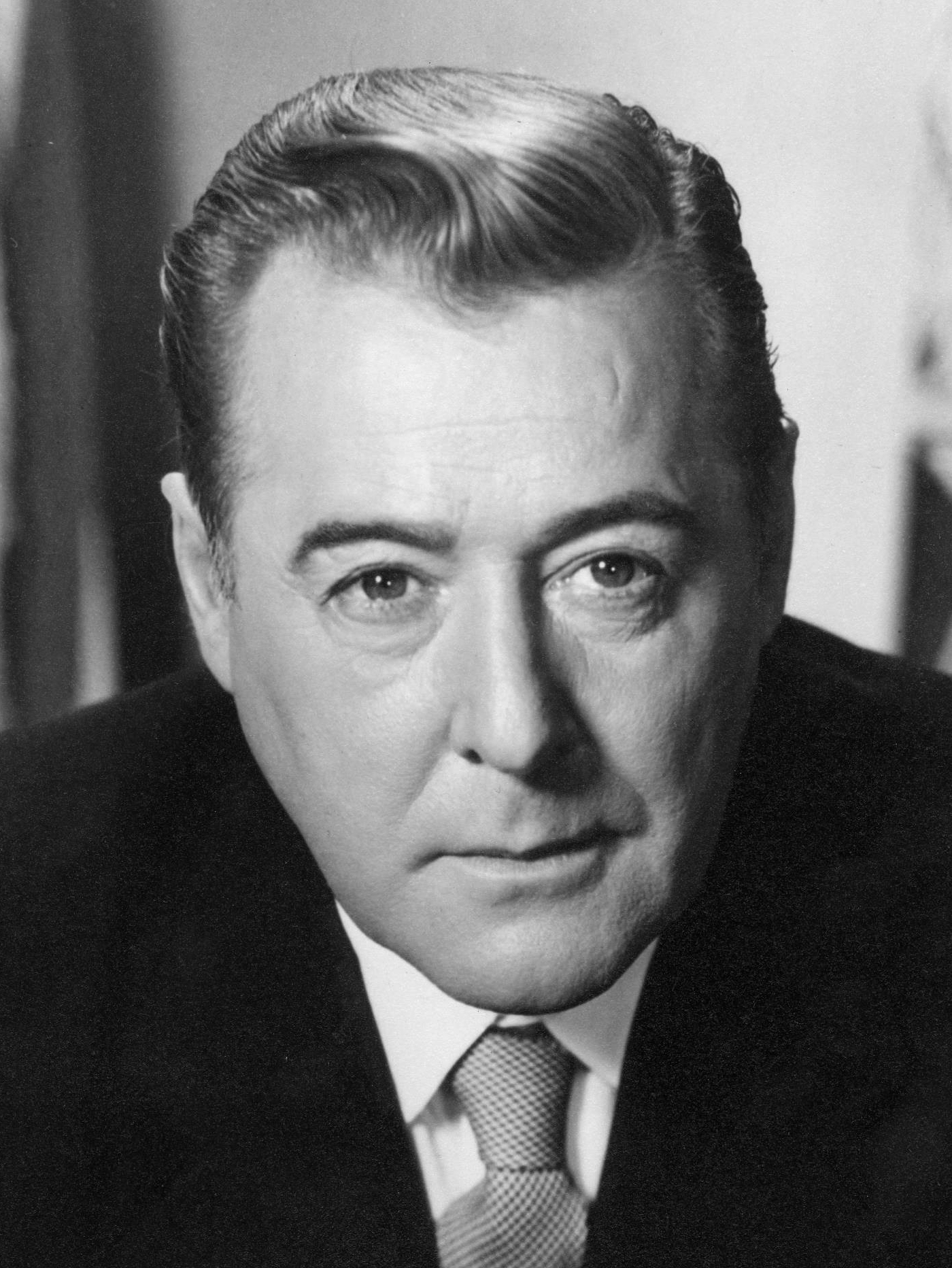

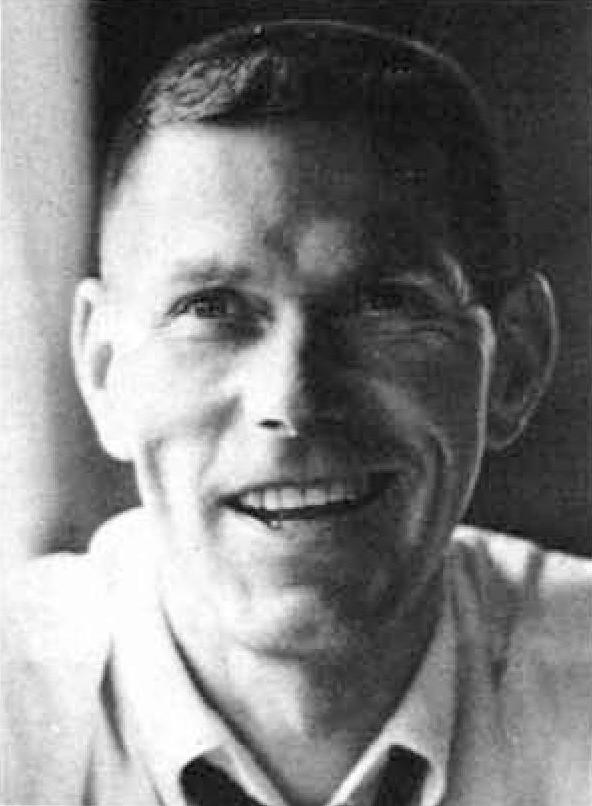
Nominee	Warren Magnuson	Jack Metcalf
Party	Democratic	Republican
Popular vote	796,183	435,894
Percentage	64.41%	35.26%
- County results Magnuson: 50–60% 60–70% 70–80% Metcalf: 50–60%
U.S. senator before election
Warren Magnuson
Democratic
Elected U.S. Senator
Warren Magnuson
Democratic

The 1968 United States Senate election in Washington was held on November 5, 1968. Incumbent Democratic U.S. Senator Warren Magnuson won a fifth term in office, defeating Republican State Senator Jack Metcalf, who only won Stevens County and San Juan County.

== Blanket primary ==
The blanket primary was held on September 17, 1968.

=== Candidates ===
==== Democratic ====
- Arthur C. DeWitt, unsuccessful candidate for Democratic nomination for U.S. Senate in 1964
- Warren G. Magnuson, incumbent United States Senator

==== Republican ====
- Harvey L. Cole
- Roy R. Fait
- Jack Metcalf, State Senator
- Ralph O. Westlake

=== Results ===
Blanket primary results
Party	Candidate	Votes	%
Democratic	Warren G. Magnuson (incumbent)	373,303	54.21%
Republican	Jack Metcalf	210,981	30.64%
Republican	Harvey L. Cole	40,844	5.93%
Democratic	Arthur C. DeWitt	28,683	4.17%
Republican	Ralph O. Westlake	25,756	3.74%
Republican	Roy R. Fait	9,096	1.32%
Total votes		688,663	100.00%

== General election ==
=== Candidates ===
- Warren Magnuson, Democratic, incumbent U.S. Senator
- Jack Metcalf, Republican, State Senator
- Irwin R. Hogenauer, New Party, peace activist
- Debbie Leonard, Socialist Workers

Magnuson's 'Finger Pointing Senator' ad boosted him far enough in the polls to secure an easy win.

=== Results ===
1968 United States Senate election in Washington
Party	Candidate	Votes	%
Democratic	Warren Magnuson (Incumbent)	796,183	64.41
Republican	Jack Metcalf	435,894	35.26
New Party	Irwin R. Hogenauer	2,762	0.22
Socialist Workers	Debbie Leonard	1,224	0.10
Majority		360,289	29.15
Turnout		1,236,063	
Democratic hold			

== See also ==
- 1968 United States Senate elections

== Bibliography ==
- Congressional Elections, 1946-1996. Washington, D.C.: Congressional Quarterly. 1998. ISBN 1-56802-248-4.
- Scammon, Richard M., ed. (1970). America Votes 8: a handbook of contemporary American election statistics, 1968. Washington, D.C.: Governmental Affairs Institute.
