= Ledger Wood =

American historian

- Born: September 4, 1901; Pueblo, Colorado
- Died: December 7, 1970 (aged 69); Columbus, Georgia

Philosophical work
- Era: 20th-century philosophy
- Region: Western Philosophy
- School: Analytic philosophy

Ledger Wood (September 4, 1901 – December 7, 1970) was a twentieth-century American philosopher.

== Life and career ==
Wood received his doctorate from Cornell University in 1926 and was appointed assistant professor of philosophy at Princeton University in 1927. He remained a member of the Princeton Philosophy Department for 43 years, serving as departmental chair from 1952 to 1960. After his retirement in 1970, he was appointed McCosh Professor of Philosophy Emeritus.

== Major works ==
=== Books ===
- The Analysis of Knowledge. 1941.
- A History of Philosophy. co-authored by Frank Thilly. McGraw-Hill Book Company. 1951.
