= Susan Gould =

American politician

Member of the Washington Senate from the 21st district
- In office January 13, 1975 – January 10, 1983
- Preceded by: Jack Metcalf
- Succeeded by: Gary A. Nelson

Personal details
- Born: Susan Emerson Gould; August 9, 1929 Seattle, Washington, U.S.
- Died: March 9, 2017 (aged 87) Edmonds, Washington, U.S.
- Party: Republican
- Spouse: Ramon Gould
- Children: 3
- Occupation: Chemist, Politician

Susan Emerson Gould (August 9, 1929 – March 9, 2017) was an American chemist and politician in the state of Washington. She served the 21st district from 1975 to 1983.

== Personal life ==
On August 27, 1950, Gould married Ramon Gould. They have three children. In 1960, Gould and her family moved to Edmonds, Washington.

On March 9, 2017, Gould died in Edmonds, Washington.
