= List of United States senators from Washington =

Current delegation

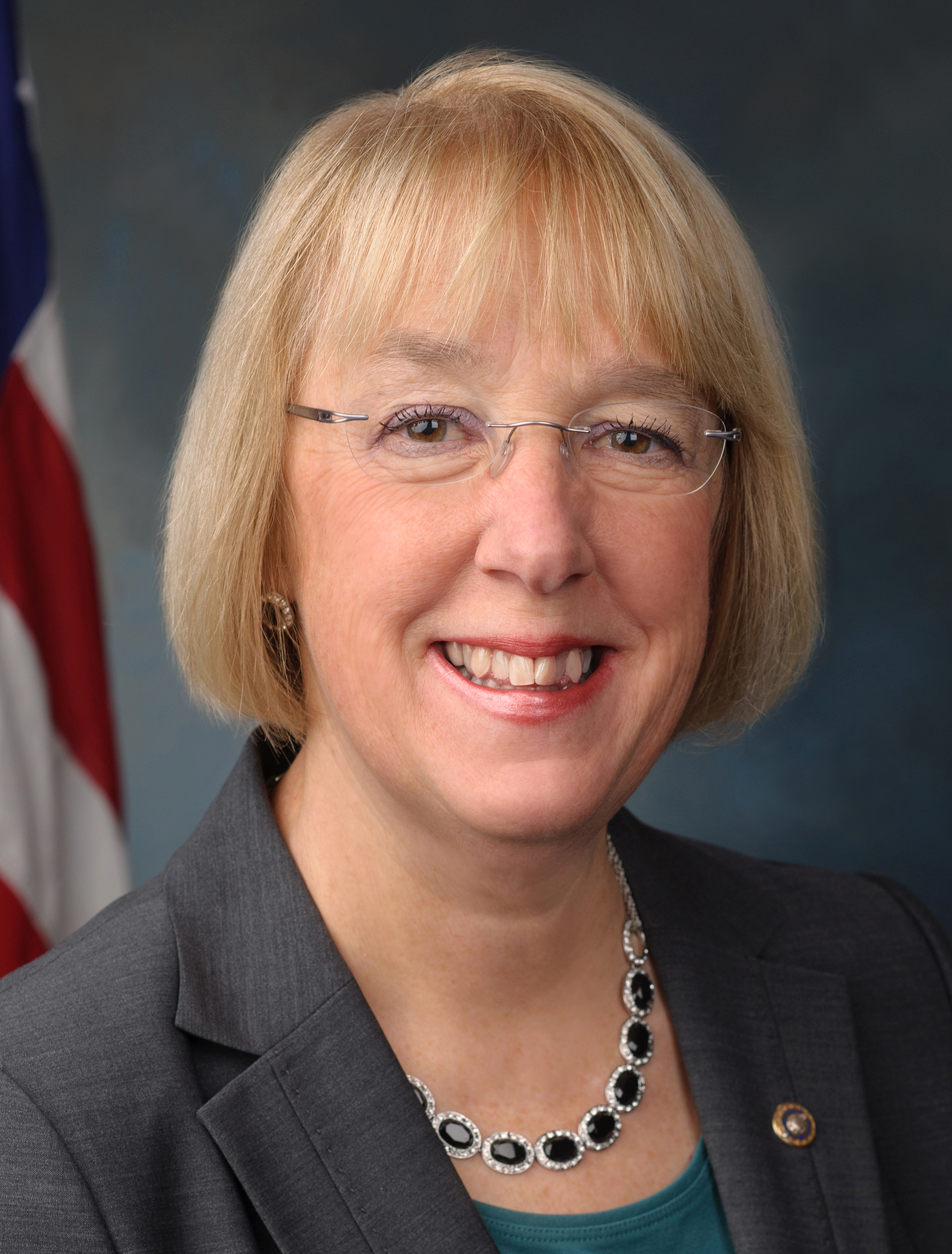
Patty Murray (D)

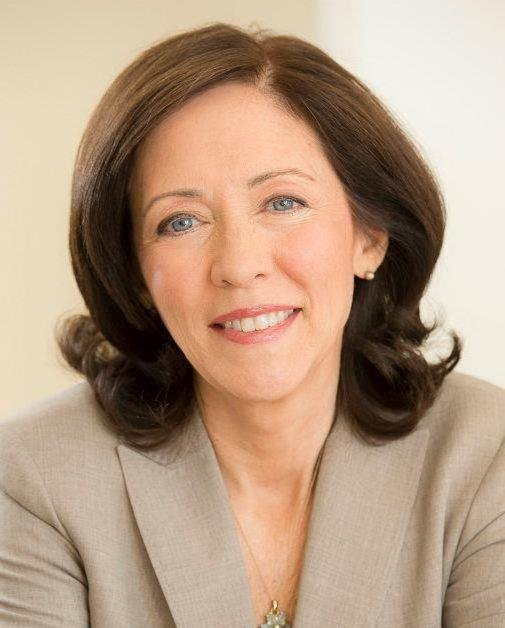
Maria Cantwell (D)

(ordered by seniority)

Washington was admitted to the Union on November 11, 1889, and elects its United States senators to class 1 and class 3. Its current U.S. senators are Democrats Patty Murray (since 1993) and Maria Cantwell (since 2001) making it one of only four states alongside Minnesota, Nevada and New Hampshire to have two female U.S. senators. Warren Magnuson was Washington's longest-serving senator (1944–1981).

== List of senators ==
Class 1 Class 1 senators belong to the electoral cycle that most recently had regular elections in 2006, 2012, 2018, and 2024. The next election will be in 2030.						C	Class 3 Class 3 senators belong to the electoral cycle that most recently had regular elections in 2004, 2010, 2016, and 2022. The next election will be in 2028.					
#	Senator	Party	Dates in office	Electoral history	T	C	T	Electoral history	Dates in office	Party	Senator	#
Vacant			Nov 11, 1889 – Nov 20, 1889	Washington elected its first senators after it was admitted to the Union.	1	51st	1	Washington elected its first senators after it was admitted to the Union.	Nov 11, 1889 – Nov 20, 1889	Vacant		
1	John B. Allen (Walla Walla)	Republican	Nov 20, 1889 – Mar 3, 1893	Elected in 1889. Legislature failed to re-elect.	1	51st	1	Elected in 1889.	Nov 20, 1889 – Mar 3, 1897	Republican	Watson C. Squire (Seattle)	1
1	John B. Allen (Walla Walla)	Republican	Nov 20, 1889 – Mar 3, 1893	Elected in 1889. Legislature failed to re-elect.	1	52nd	2	Re-elected in 1891. Lost re-election.	Nov 20, 1889 – Mar 3, 1897	Republican	Watson C. Squire (Seattle)	1
Vacant			Mar 4, 1893 – Feb 19, 1895	Legislature failed to elect. The governor appointed John Allen, but the Senate rejected his credentials.	2	53rd	2	Re-elected in 1891. Lost re-election.	Nov 20, 1889 – Mar 3, 1897	Republican	Watson C. Squire (Seattle)	1
2	John L. Wilson (Spokane)	Republican	Feb 19, 1895 – Mar 3, 1899	Elected in 1895 to finish the vacant term, but took his seat late. Lost renomination.	2	53rd	2	Re-elected in 1891. Lost re-election.	Nov 20, 1889 – Mar 3, 1897	Republican	Watson C. Squire (Seattle)	1
2	John L. Wilson (Spokane)	Republican	Feb 19, 1895 – Mar 3, 1899	Elected in 1895 to finish the vacant term, but took his seat late. Lost renomination.	2	54th	2	Re-elected in 1891. Lost re-election.	Nov 20, 1889 – Mar 3, 1897	Republican	Watson C. Squire (Seattle)	1
2	John L. Wilson (Spokane)	Republican	Feb 19, 1895 – Mar 3, 1899	Elected in 1895 to finish the vacant term, but took his seat late. Lost renomination.	2	55th	3	Elected in 1897. Lost re-election as a Democrat.	Mar 4, 1897 – Mar 3, 1903	Silver Republican	George Turner (Spokane)	2
3	Addison G. Foster (Tacoma)	Republican	Mar 4, 1899 – Mar 3, 1905	Elected in 1899. Retired.	3	56th	3	Elected in 1897. Lost re-election as a Democrat.	Mar 4, 1897 – Mar 3, 1903	Silver Republican	George Turner (Spokane)	2
3	Addison G. Foster (Tacoma)	Republican	Mar 4, 1899 – Mar 3, 1905	Elected in 1899. Retired.	3	57th	3	Elected in 1897. Lost re-election as a Democrat.	Mar 4, 1897 – Mar 3, 1903	Silver Republican	George Turner (Spokane)	2
3	Addison G. Foster (Tacoma)	Republican	Mar 4, 1899 – Mar 3, 1905	Elected in 1899. Retired.	3	58th	4	Elected in 1903. Lost renomination.	Mar 4, 1903 – Mar 3, 1909	Republican	Levi Ankeny (Walla Walla)	3
4	Samuel H. Piles (Seattle)	Republican	Mar 4, 1905 – Mar 3, 1911	Elected in 1905. Retired.	4	59th	4	Elected in 1903. Lost renomination.	Mar 4, 1903 – Mar 3, 1909	Republican	Levi Ankeny (Walla Walla)	3
4	Samuel H. Piles (Seattle)	Republican	Mar 4, 1905 – Mar 3, 1911	Elected in 1905. Retired.	4	60th	4	Elected in 1903. Lost renomination.	Mar 4, 1903 – Mar 3, 1909	Republican	Levi Ankeny (Walla Walla)	3
4	Samuel H. Piles (Seattle)	Republican	Mar 4, 1905 – Mar 3, 1911	Elected in 1905. Retired.	4	61st	5	Elected in 1909.	Mar 4, 1909 – Nov 19, 1932	Republican	Wesley L. Jones (Seattle)	4
5	Miles Poindexter (Spokane)	Republican	Mar 4, 1911 – Mar 3, 1923	Elected in 1911.	5	62nd	5	Elected in 1909.	Mar 4, 1909 – Nov 19, 1932	Republican	Wesley L. Jones (Seattle)	4
5	Miles Poindexter (Spokane)	Progressive	Mar 4, 1911 – Mar 3, 1923	Elected in 1911.	5	63rd	5	Elected in 1909.	Mar 4, 1909 – Nov 19, 1932	Republican	Wesley L. Jones (Seattle)	4
5	Miles Poindexter (Spokane)	Republican	Mar 4, 1911 – Mar 3, 1923	Elected in 1911.	5	64th	6	Re-elected in 1914.	Mar 4, 1909 – Nov 19, 1932	Republican	Wesley L. Jones (Seattle)	4
5	Miles Poindexter (Spokane)	Republican	Mar 4, 1911 – Mar 3, 1923	Re-elected in 1916. Lost re-election.	6	65th	6	Re-elected in 1914.	Mar 4, 1909 – Nov 19, 1932	Republican	Wesley L. Jones (Seattle)	4
5	Miles Poindexter (Spokane)	Republican	Mar 4, 1911 – Mar 3, 1923	Re-elected in 1916. Lost re-election.	6	66th	6	Re-elected in 1914.	Mar 4, 1909 – Nov 19, 1932	Republican	Wesley L. Jones (Seattle)	4
5	Miles Poindexter (Spokane)	Republican	Mar 4, 1911 – Mar 3, 1923	Re-elected in 1916. Lost re-election.	6	67th	7	Re-elected in 1920.	Mar 4, 1909 – Nov 19, 1932	Republican	Wesley L. Jones (Seattle)	4
6	Clarence Dill (Spokane)	Democratic	Mar 4, 1923 – Jan 3, 1935	Elected in 1922.	7	68th	7	Re-elected in 1920.	Mar 4, 1909 – Nov 19, 1932	Republican	Wesley L. Jones (Seattle)	4
6	Clarence Dill (Spokane)	Democratic	Mar 4, 1923 – Jan 3, 1935	Elected in 1922.	7	69th	7	Re-elected in 1920.	Mar 4, 1909 – Nov 19, 1932	Republican	Wesley L. Jones (Seattle)	4
6	Clarence Dill (Spokane)	Democratic	Mar 4, 1923 – Jan 3, 1935	Elected in 1922.	7	70th	8	Re-elected in 1926. Died, having already lost re-election.	Mar 4, 1909 – Nov 19, 1932	Republican	Wesley L. Jones (Seattle)	4
6	Clarence Dill (Spokane)	Democratic	Mar 4, 1923 – Jan 3, 1935	Re-elected in 1928. Retired.	8	71st	8	Re-elected in 1926. Died, having already lost re-election.	Mar 4, 1909 – Nov 19, 1932	Republican	Wesley L. Jones (Seattle)	4
6	Clarence Dill (Spokane)	Democratic	Mar 4, 1923 – Jan 3, 1935	Re-elected in 1928. Retired.	8	72nd	8	Re-elected in 1926. Died, having already lost re-election.	Mar 4, 1909 – Nov 19, 1932	Republican	Wesley L. Jones (Seattle)	4
6	Clarence Dill (Spokane)	Democratic	Mar 4, 1923 – Jan 3, 1935	Re-elected in 1928. Retired.	8	72nd	8		Nov 19, 1932 – Nov 22, 1932	Vacant		
6	Clarence Dill (Spokane)	Democratic	Mar 4, 1923 – Jan 3, 1935	Re-elected in 1928. Retired.	8	72nd	8	Appointed to finish Jones's term. Retired.	Nov 22, 1932 – Mar 3, 1933	Republican	Elijah S. Grammer (Seattle)	5
6	Clarence Dill (Spokane)	Democratic	Mar 4, 1923 – Jan 3, 1935	Re-elected in 1928. Retired.	8	73rd	9	Elected in 1932.	Mar 4, 1933 – Nov 13, 1944	Democratic	Homer Bone (Tacoma)	6
7	Lewis B. Schwellenbach (Neppel)	Democratic	Jan 3, 1935 – Dec 16, 1940	Elected in 1934. Resigned to become judge of the US District Court of the Eastern District of Washington.	9	74th	9	Elected in 1932.	Mar 4, 1933 – Nov 13, 1944	Democratic	Homer Bone (Tacoma)	6
7	Lewis B. Schwellenbach (Neppel)	Democratic	Jan 3, 1935 – Dec 16, 1940	Elected in 1934. Resigned to become judge of the US District Court of the Eastern District of Washington.	9	75th	9	Elected in 1932.	Mar 4, 1933 – Nov 13, 1944	Democratic	Homer Bone (Tacoma)	6
7	Lewis B. Schwellenbach (Neppel)	Democratic	Jan 3, 1935 – Dec 16, 1940	Elected in 1934. Resigned to become judge of the US District Court of the Eastern District of Washington.	9	76th	10	Re-elected in 1938. Resigned to become Judge on the United States Court of Appeals for the Ninth Circuit.	Mar 4, 1933 – Nov 13, 1944	Democratic	Homer Bone (Tacoma)	6
Vacant			Dec 16, 1940 – Dec 19, 1940		9	76th	10	Re-elected in 1938. Resigned to become Judge on the United States Court of Appeals for the Ninth Circuit.	Mar 4, 1933 – Nov 13, 1944	Democratic	Homer Bone (Tacoma)	6
8	Monrad Wallgren (Everett)	Democratic	Dec 19, 1940 – Jan 9, 1945	Appointed to finish Schwellenbach's term, having already been elected to the next term.	9	76th	10	Re-elected in 1938. Resigned to become Judge on the United States Court of Appeals for the Ninth Circuit.	Mar 4, 1933 – Nov 13, 1944	Democratic	Homer Bone (Tacoma)	6
8	Monrad Wallgren (Everett)	Democratic	Dec 19, 1940 – Jan 9, 1945	Elected in 1940. Resigned to become Governor of Washington.	10	77th	10	Re-elected in 1938. Resigned to become Judge on the United States Court of Appeals for the Ninth Circuit.	Mar 4, 1933 – Nov 13, 1944	Democratic	Homer Bone (Tacoma)	6
8	Monrad Wallgren (Everett)	Democratic	Dec 19, 1940 – Jan 9, 1945	Elected in 1940. Resigned to become Governor of Washington.	10	78th	10	Re-elected in 1938. Resigned to become Judge on the United States Court of Appeals for the Ninth Circuit.	Mar 4, 1933 – Nov 13, 1944	Democratic	Homer Bone (Tacoma)	6
8	Monrad Wallgren (Everett)	Democratic	Dec 19, 1940 – Jan 9, 1945	Elected in 1940. Resigned to become Governor of Washington.	10	78th	10		Nov 13, 1944 – Dec 14, 1944	Vacant		
8	Monrad Wallgren (Everett)	Democratic	Dec 19, 1940 – Jan 9, 1945	Elected in 1940. Resigned to become Governor of Washington.	10	78th	10	Appointed to finish Bone's term, having already been elected to the next term.	Dec 14, 1944 – Jan 3, 1981	Democratic	Warren Magnuson (Seattle)	7
8	Monrad Wallgren (Everett)	Democratic	Dec 19, 1940 – Jan 9, 1945	Elected in 1940. Resigned to become Governor of Washington.	10	79th	11	Elected in 1944.	Dec 14, 1944 – Jan 3, 1981	Democratic	Warren Magnuson (Seattle)	7
9	Hugh Mitchell (Everett)	Democratic	Jan 10, 1945 – Dec 25, 1946	Appointed to finish Wallgren's term. Lost election to next term and resigned.	10	79th	11	Elected in 1944.	Dec 14, 1944 – Jan 3, 1981	Democratic	Warren Magnuson (Seattle)	7
10	Harry P. Cain (Tacoma)	Republican	Dec 26, 1946 – Jan 3, 1953	Appointed to finish Wallgren's term, having already been elected to the next term.	10	79th	11	Elected in 1944.	Dec 14, 1944 – Jan 3, 1981	Democratic	Warren Magnuson (Seattle)	7
10	Harry P. Cain (Tacoma)	Republican	Dec 26, 1946 – Jan 3, 1953	Elected in 1946. Lost re-election.	11	80th	11	Elected in 1944.	Dec 14, 1944 – Jan 3, 1981	Democratic	Warren Magnuson (Seattle)	7
10	Harry P. Cain (Tacoma)	Republican	Dec 26, 1946 – Jan 3, 1953	Elected in 1946. Lost re-election.	11	81st	11	Elected in 1944.	Dec 14, 1944 – Jan 3, 1981	Democratic	Warren Magnuson (Seattle)	7
10	Harry P. Cain (Tacoma)	Republican	Dec 26, 1946 – Jan 3, 1953	Elected in 1946. Lost re-election.	11	82nd	12	Re-elected in 1950.	Dec 14, 1944 – Jan 3, 1981	Democratic	Warren Magnuson (Seattle)	7
11	Henry M. Jackson (Everett)	Democratic	Jan 3, 1953 – Sep 1, 1983	Elected in 1952.	12	83rd	12	Re-elected in 1950.	Dec 14, 1944 – Jan 3, 1981	Democratic	Warren Magnuson (Seattle)	7
11	Henry M. Jackson (Everett)	Democratic	Jan 3, 1953 – Sep 1, 1983	Elected in 1952.	12	84th	12	Re-elected in 1950.	Dec 14, 1944 – Jan 3, 1981	Democratic	Warren Magnuson (Seattle)	7
11	Henry M. Jackson (Everett)	Democratic	Jan 3, 1953 – Sep 1, 1983	Elected in 1952.	12	85th	13	Re-elected in 1956.	Dec 14, 1944 – Jan 3, 1981	Democratic	Warren Magnuson (Seattle)	7
11	Henry M. Jackson (Everett)	Democratic	Jan 3, 1953 – Sep 1, 1983	Re-elected in 1958.	13	86th	13	Re-elected in 1956.	Dec 14, 1944 – Jan 3, 1981	Democratic	Warren Magnuson (Seattle)	7
11	Henry M. Jackson (Everett)	Democratic	Jan 3, 1953 – Sep 1, 1983	Re-elected in 1958.	13	87th	13	Re-elected in 1956.	Dec 14, 1944 – Jan 3, 1981	Democratic	Warren Magnuson (Seattle)	7
11	Henry M. Jackson (Everett)	Democratic	Jan 3, 1953 – Sep 1, 1983	Re-elected in 1958.	13	88th	14	Re-elected in 1962.	Dec 14, 1944 – Jan 3, 1981	Democratic	Warren Magnuson (Seattle)	7
11	Henry M. Jackson (Everett)	Democratic	Jan 3, 1953 – Sep 1, 1983	Re-elected in 1964.	14	89th	14	Re-elected in 1962.	Dec 14, 1944 – Jan 3, 1981	Democratic	Warren Magnuson (Seattle)	7
11	Henry M. Jackson (Everett)	Democratic	Jan 3, 1953 – Sep 1, 1983	Re-elected in 1964.	14	90th	14	Re-elected in 1962.	Dec 14, 1944 – Jan 3, 1981	Democratic	Warren Magnuson (Seattle)	7
11	Henry M. Jackson (Everett)	Democratic	Jan 3, 1953 – Sep 1, 1983	Re-elected in 1964.	14	91st	15	Re-elected in 1968.	Dec 14, 1944 – Jan 3, 1981	Democratic	Warren Magnuson (Seattle)	7
11	Henry M. Jackson (Everett)	Democratic	Jan 3, 1953 – Sep 1, 1983	Re-elected in 1970.	15	92nd	15	Re-elected in 1968.	Dec 14, 1944 – Jan 3, 1981	Democratic	Warren Magnuson (Seattle)	7
11	Henry M. Jackson (Everett)	Democratic	Jan 3, 1953 – Sep 1, 1983	Re-elected in 1970.	15	93rd	15	Re-elected in 1968.	Dec 14, 1944 – Jan 3, 1981	Democratic	Warren Magnuson (Seattle)	7
11	Henry M. Jackson (Everett)	Democratic	Jan 3, 1953 – Sep 1, 1983	Re-elected in 1970.	15	94th	16	Re-elected in 1974. Lost re-election.	Dec 14, 1944 – Jan 3, 1981	Democratic	Warren Magnuson (Seattle)	7
11	Henry M. Jackson (Everett)	Democratic	Jan 3, 1953 – Sep 1, 1983	Re-elected in 1976.	16	95th	16	Re-elected in 1974. Lost re-election.	Dec 14, 1944 – Jan 3, 1981	Democratic	Warren Magnuson (Seattle)	7
11	Henry M. Jackson (Everett)	Democratic	Jan 3, 1953 – Sep 1, 1983	Re-elected in 1976.	16	96th	16	Re-elected in 1974. Lost re-election.	Dec 14, 1944 – Jan 3, 1981	Democratic	Warren Magnuson (Seattle)	7
11	Henry M. Jackson (Everett)	Democratic	Jan 3, 1953 – Sep 1, 1983	Re-elected in 1976.	16	97th	17	Elected in 1980. Lost re-election.	Jan 3, 1981 – Jan 3, 1987	Republican	Slade Gorton (Olympia)	8
11	Henry M. Jackson (Everett)	Democratic	Jan 3, 1953 – Sep 1, 1983	Re-elected in 1982. Died.	17	98th	17	Elected in 1980. Lost re-election.	Jan 3, 1981 – Jan 3, 1987	Republican	Slade Gorton (Olympia)	8
Vacant			Sep 1, 1983 – Sep 8, 1983		17	98th	17	Elected in 1980. Lost re-election.	Jan 3, 1981 – Jan 3, 1987	Republican	Slade Gorton (Olympia)	8
12	Daniel J. Evans (Seattle)	Republican	Sep 8, 1983 – Jan 3, 1989	Appointed to continue Jackson's term. Elected to finish Jackson's term. Retired.	17	98th	17	Elected in 1980. Lost re-election.	Jan 3, 1981 – Jan 3, 1987	Republican	Slade Gorton (Olympia)	8
12	Daniel J. Evans (Seattle)	Republican	Sep 8, 1983 – Jan 3, 1989	Appointed to continue Jackson's term. Elected to finish Jackson's term. Retired.	17	99th	17	Elected in 1980. Lost re-election.	Jan 3, 1981 – Jan 3, 1987	Republican	Slade Gorton (Olympia)	8
12	Daniel J. Evans (Seattle)	Republican	Sep 8, 1983 – Jan 3, 1989	Appointed to continue Jackson's term. Elected to finish Jackson's term. Retired.	17	100th	18	Elected in 1986. Retired.	Jan 3, 1987 – Jan 3, 1993	Democratic	Brock Adams (Seattle)	9
13	Slade Gorton (Seattle)	Republican	Jan 3, 1989 – Jan 3, 2001	Elected in 1988.	18	101st	18	Elected in 1986. Retired.	Jan 3, 1987 – Jan 3, 1993	Democratic	Brock Adams (Seattle)	9
13	Slade Gorton (Seattle)	Republican	Jan 3, 1989 – Jan 3, 2001	Elected in 1988.	18	102nd	18	Elected in 1986. Retired.	Jan 3, 1987 – Jan 3, 1993	Democratic	Brock Adams (Seattle)	9
13	Slade Gorton (Seattle)	Republican	Jan 3, 1989 – Jan 3, 2001	Elected in 1988.	18	103rd	19	Elected in 1992.	Jan 3, 1993 – present	Democratic	Patty Murray (Seattle)	10
13	Slade Gorton (Seattle)	Republican	Jan 3, 1989 – Jan 3, 2001	Re-elected in 1994. Lost re-election.	19	104th	19	Elected in 1992.	Jan 3, 1993 – present	Democratic	Patty Murray (Seattle)	10
13	Slade Gorton (Seattle)	Republican	Jan 3, 1989 – Jan 3, 2001	Re-elected in 1994. Lost re-election.	19	105th	19	Elected in 1992.	Jan 3, 1993 – present	Democratic	Patty Murray (Seattle)	10
13	Slade Gorton (Seattle)	Republican	Jan 3, 1989 – Jan 3, 2001	Re-elected in 1994. Lost re-election.	19	106th	20	Re-elected in 1998.	Jan 3, 1993 – present	Democratic	Patty Murray (Seattle)	10
14	Maria Cantwell (Edmonds)	Democratic	Jan 3, 2001 – present	Elected in 2000.	20	107th	20	Re-elected in 1998.	Jan 3, 1993 – present	Democratic	Patty Murray (Seattle)	10
14	Maria Cantwell (Edmonds)	Democratic	Jan 3, 2001 – present	Elected in 2000.	20	108th	20	Re-elected in 1998.	Jan 3, 1993 – present	Democratic	Patty Murray (Seattle)	10
14	Maria Cantwell (Edmonds)	Democratic	Jan 3, 2001 – present	Elected in 2000.	20	109th	21	Re-elected in 2004.	Jan 3, 1993 – present	Democratic	Patty Murray (Seattle)	10
14	Maria Cantwell (Edmonds)	Democratic	Jan 3, 2001 – present	Re-elected in 2006.	21	110th	21	Re-elected in 2004.	Jan 3, 1993 – present	Democratic	Patty Murray (Seattle)	10
14	Maria Cantwell (Edmonds)	Democratic	Jan 3, 2001 – present	Re-elected in 2006.	21	111th	21	Re-elected in 2004.	Jan 3, 1993 – present	Democratic	Patty Murray (Seattle)	10
14	Maria Cantwell (Edmonds)	Democratic	Jan 3, 2001 – present	Re-elected in 2006.	21	112th	22	Re-elected in 2010.	Jan 3, 1993 – present	Democratic	Patty Murray (Seattle)	10
14	Maria Cantwell (Edmonds)	Democratic	Jan 3, 2001 – present	Re-elected in 2012.	22	113th	22	Re-elected in 2010.	Jan 3, 1993 – present	Democratic	Patty Murray (Seattle)	10
14	Maria Cantwell (Edmonds)	Democratic	Jan 3, 2001 – present	Re-elected in 2012.	22	114th	22	Re-elected in 2010.	Jan 3, 1993 – present	Democratic	Patty Murray (Seattle)	10
14	Maria Cantwell (Edmonds)	Democratic	Jan 3, 2001 – present	Re-elected in 2012.	22	115th	23	Re-elected in 2016.	Jan 3, 1993 – present	Democratic	Patty Murray (Seattle)	10
14	Maria Cantwell (Edmonds)	Democratic	Jan 3, 2001 – present	Re-elected in 2018.	23	116th	23	Re-elected in 2016.	Jan 3, 1993 – present	Democratic	Patty Murray (Seattle)	10
14	Maria Cantwell (Edmonds)	Democratic	Jan 3, 2001 – present	Re-elected in 2018.	23	117th	23	Re-elected in 2016.	Jan 3, 1993 – present	Democratic	Patty Murray (Seattle)	10
14	Maria Cantwell (Edmonds)	Democratic	Jan 3, 2001 – present	Re-elected in 2018.	23	118th	24	Re-elected in 2022.	Jan 3, 1993 – present	Democratic	Patty Murray (Seattle)	10
14	Maria Cantwell (Edmonds)	Democratic	Jan 3, 2001 – present	Re-elected in 2024.	24	119th	24	Re-elected in 2022.	Jan 3, 1993 – present	Democratic	Patty Murray (Seattle)	10
14	Maria Cantwell (Edmonds)	Democratic	Jan 3, 2001 – present	Re-elected in 2024.	24	120th	24	Re-elected in 2022.	Jan 3, 1993 – present	Democratic	Patty Murray (Seattle)	10
14	Maria Cantwell (Edmonds)	Democratic	Jan 3, 2001 – present	Re-elected in 2024.	24	121st	25	To be determined in the 2028 election.				
To be determined in the 2030 election.					25	122nd	25	To be determined in the 2028 election.				

== See also ==
- Elections in Washington (state)
- List of United States representatives from Washington
- Washington's congressional delegations
