= Warren Magnuson =

American politician (1905–1989)

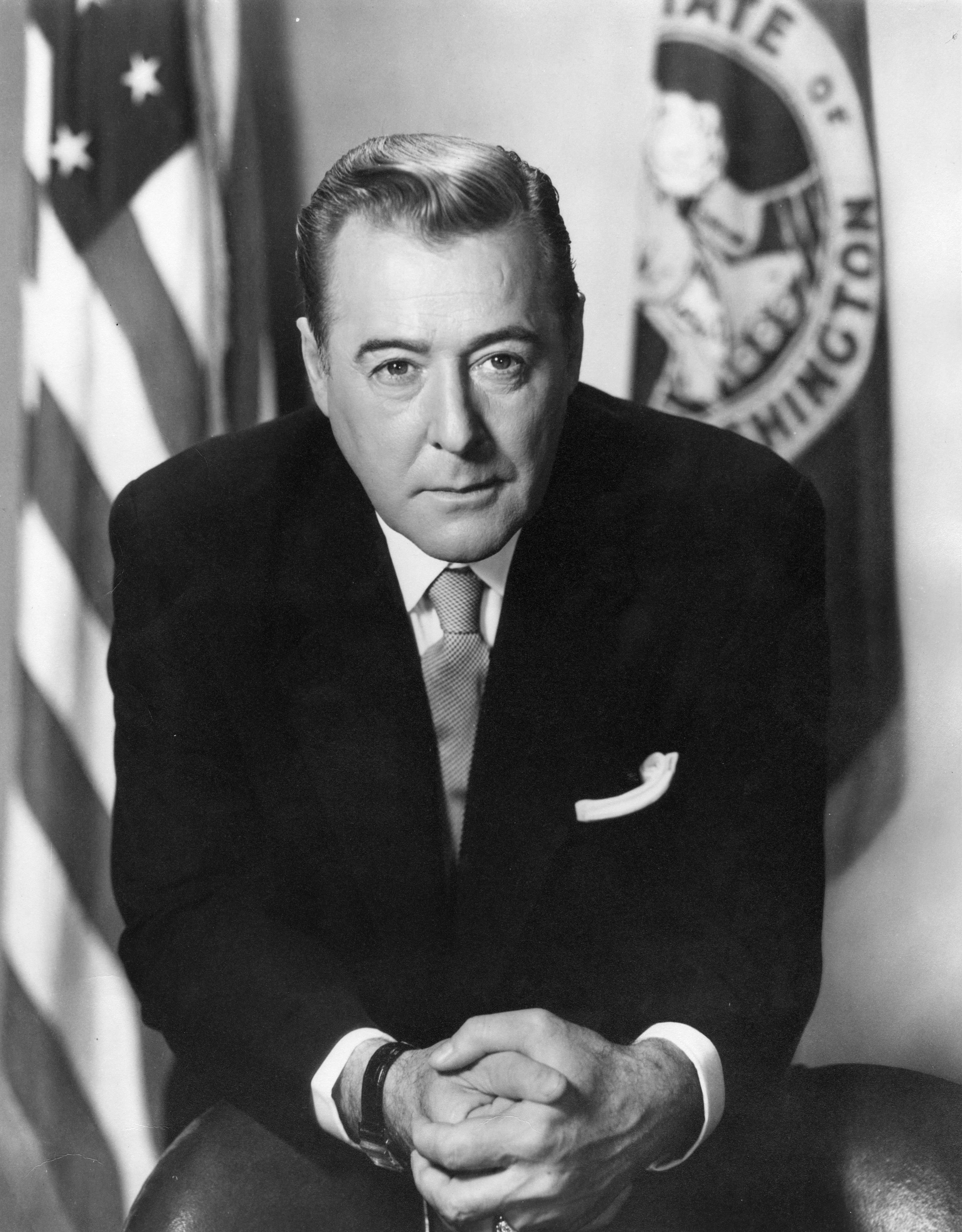
- Portrait by Fred Milkie c. 1956

President pro tempore of the United States Senate
- In office December 6, 1980 – January 3, 1981
- Preceded by: Milton Young
- Succeeded by: Strom Thurmond
- In office January 3, 1979 – December 5, 1980
- Preceded by: James Eastland
- Succeeded by: Milton Young

United States Senator from Washington
- In office December 14, 1944 – January 3, 1981
- Preceded by: Homer Bone
- Succeeded by: Slade Gorton
Committee chairmanships
Chair of the Senate Appropriations Committee
In office November 28, 1977 – January 3, 1981
Preceded by	John McClellan
Succeeded by	Mark Hatfield
Chair of the Senate Commerce Committee
In office January 3, 1955 – January 3, 1978
Preceded by	John Bricker
Succeeded by	Howard Cannon

Member of the U.S. House of Representatives from Washington's 1st district
- In office January 3, 1937 – December 13, 1944
- Preceded by: Marion Zioncheck
- Succeeded by: Emerson DeLacy

King County Prosecuting Attorney
- In office January 1, 1935 – January 3, 1937
- Preceded by: Robert M. Burgunder
- Succeeded by: B. Gray Warner

Member of the Washington House of Representatives from the 37th district
- In office January 9, 1933 – January 14, 1935
- Preceded by: George F. Murray
- Succeeded by: A. Lou Cohen

Personal details
- Born: April 12, 1905 Moorhead, Minnesota, U.S.
- Died: May 20, 1989 (aged 84) Seattle, Washington, U.S.
- Resting place: Acacia Memorial Park; 47.73920°N 122.29280°W
- Party: Democratic
- Spouses: Eleanor Peggy "Peggins" Maddieux (m. 1928; div. 1935) Jermaine (Elliott) Peralta (m. 1964)
- Education: University of North Dakota; North Dakota Agricultural College; University of Washington (BA, LLB)
- Profession: Attorney

Military service
- Allegiance: United States
- Branch/service: United States Navy
- Years of service: 1941–1942
- Rank: Lieutenant Commander
- Battles/wars: World War II; Pacific War

Warren Grant Magnuson (April 12, 1905 – May 20, 1989) was an American lawyer and politician who represented the state of Washington in Congress for 44 years, first as a representative from 1937 to 1944, and then as a senator from 1944 to 1981. Magnuson was a member of the Democratic Party. He was Washington state's longest-serving senator, serving over 36 years. During his final two years in office, he was the most senior senator and president pro tempore. Magnuson was the longest-serving member of Congress to end his career by being defeated for reelection. (Note: Magnuson was the second-longest-serving senator to lose reelection; Ted Stevens lost reelection in 2008 after serving longer (40 years to Magnuson's 36), though Magnuson's House service makes his entire congressional tenure longer than Stevens's career. Emanuel Celler served longer in total (50 years to Magnuson's 44), but lost renomination in his party's primary, rather than reelection in the general election. By comparison, Jack Brooks is the longest-serving member of Congress to only serve in one chamber and lose reelection, after 42 years in the House. By combined tenure, Magnuson holds the record as of 2026.)

== Early life and education ==
Warren Magnuson was born in Moorhead, Minnesota. His birthdate is supposedly April 12, 1905, but the actual records of his birth are sealed. According to various sources, he never knew his birth parents; they may have died within a month of his birth, or his unmarried mother may have put him up for adoption. William Grant and Emma (née Anderson) Magnuson adopted Warren, and gave him their name. The Magnusons were second-generation Scandinavian immigrants who operated a bar in Moorhead, and adopted a daughter, Clara, a year after adopting Warren. His adoptive father left the family in 1921.

Magnuson attended Moorhead High School, where he played quarterback on the football team and was captain of the baseball team. While in high school, he ran a YMCA camp, worked on wheat farms, and delivered newspapers and telegrams in Moorhead and nearby Fargo, North Dakota. He graduated in 1923, and then enrolled at the University of North Dakota in Grand Forks. In 1924, he transferred to the North Dakota Agricultural College in Fargo, which he attended for a year. He then traveled through Canada for some time, riding freight trains and working with threshing crews.

Magnuson followed a high school girlfriend to Seattle, Washington, where he entered the University of Washington in 1925. He was a member of Theta Chi fraternity, and worked delivering ice as a Teamsters member under Dave Beck. He received a Bachelor of Arts degree in 1926, and earned a Bachelor of Laws degree from the University of Washington School of Law in 1929. A Democrat, he first became active in politics in 1928, volunteering for A. Scott Bullitt for governor and Al Smith for president.

== Early career ==
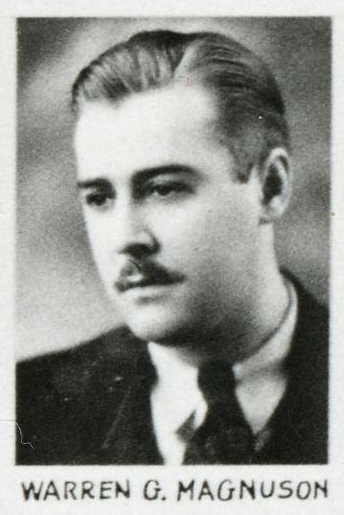
Magnuson's official State House portrait, 1933

In 1929, Magnuson was admitted to the bar and joined the law office of Judge Samuel Stern in Seattle. He served as secretary of the Seattle Municipal League from 1930 to 1931 and served as a special prosecutor for King County in 1932, investigating official misconduct. He founded the state chapter of the Young Democrats of America that same year. He was a leading supporter of repealing state Prohibition laws and establishing the state Liquor Control Board.

From 1933 to 1935, Magnuson served as a member of the Washington House of Representatives from the Seattle-based 37th Legislative District. As a state legislator, he sponsored the first unemployment compensation bill in the nation. Magnuson was a delegate to the state constitutional convention in 1933. He briefly served as Assistant United States District Attorney before being elected prosecuting attorney of King County, serving from 1934 to 1936.

== Congressional career ==
=== House of Representatives ===
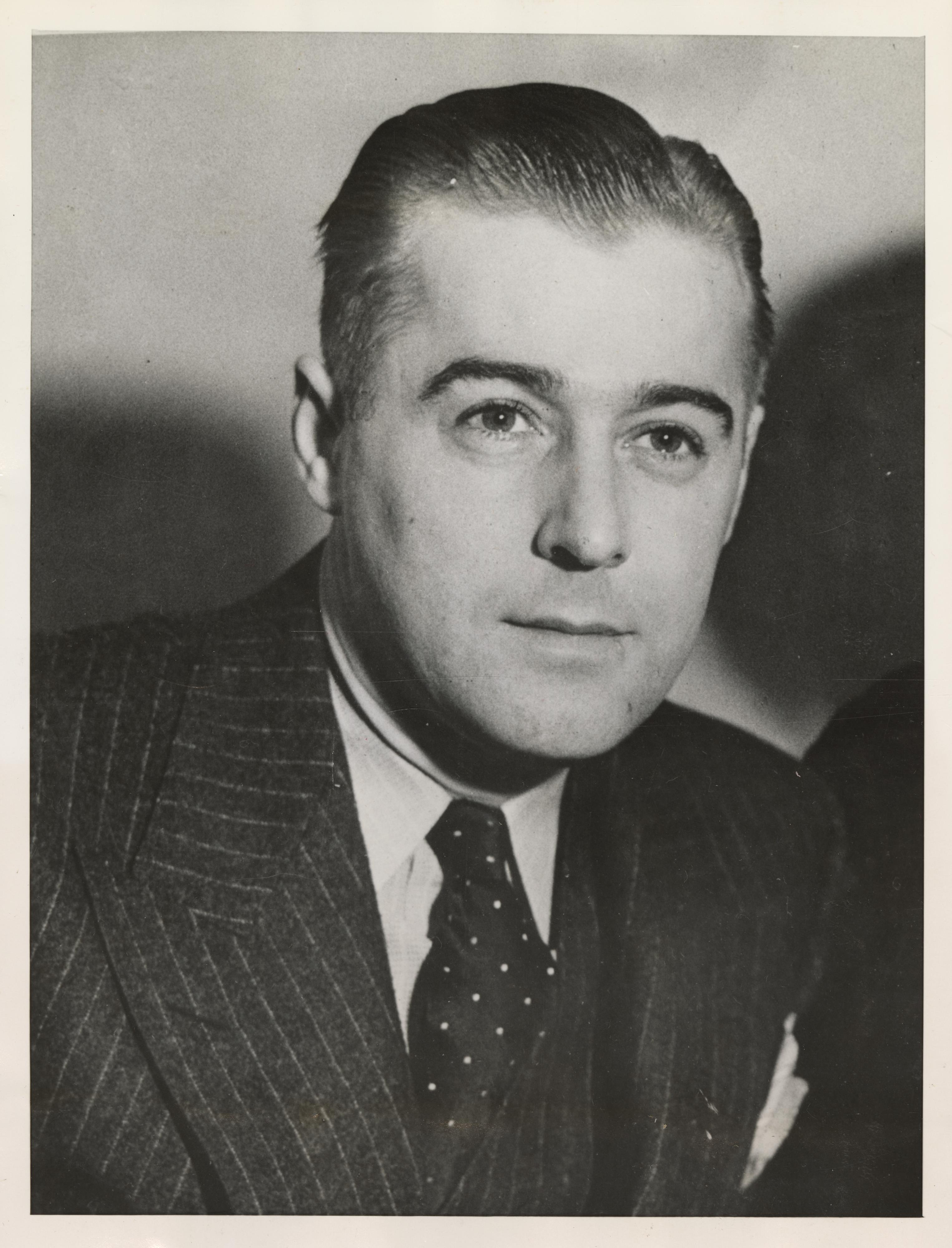
Magnuson shortly after his election to Congress, November 5, 1936

In 1936, as incumbent Congressman and Magnuson's friend Marion Zioncheck showed serious mental instability and uncertainty about seeking reelection, Magnuson announced his candidacy. Two days after Magnuson entered the race, Zioncheck announced that he would not run again, and within a week Zioncheck committed suicide by jumping from his office window. With the endorsement of the influential, left-wing Washington Commonwealth Federation and support from the Seattle business community, Magnuson easily won the Democratic primary and then the general election.

In 1937, Magnuson and Senators Homer Bone and Matthew M. Neely introduced the National Cancer Institute Act, signed into law by Franklin Roosevelt on August 5 of that year. He was reelected in 1938, 1940, and 1942. After the attack on Pearl Harbor, Magnuson staunchly supported the U.S. war effort.

Magnuson served in the United States Navy during World War II. He was aboard the aircraft carrier USS Enterprise for several months, seeing heavy combat in the Pacific Theater until Roosevelt ordered all congressmen on active duty to return home in 1942.

=== Senate ===
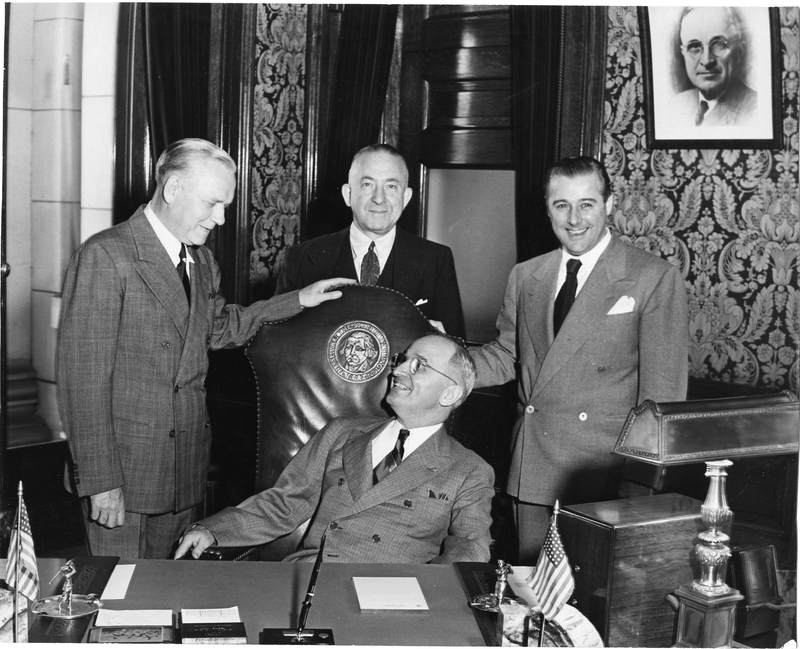
President Harry S. Truman (seated) behind the desk of Washington Governor Monrad Wallgren (left) in Wallgren's office in Olympia, Washington, June 1945. Center is Alaska Governor Ernest Gruening and right is Magnuson.

In 1944, Magnuson was elected to the U.S. Senate. On December 14, 1944, Governor Arthur B. Langlie appointed Magnuson to fill the vacancy created by Homer Bone's appointment to the Ninth Circuit Court of Appeals. He resigned from the House and started his Senate tenure a month early, gaining an advantage in seniority.

"The Pointing Ad," a television advertisement by George Lois that contributed to Magnuson's reelection, 1968

Magnuson was reelected in 1950, 1956, 1962, 1968, and 1974. He served on the Senate Commerce Committee throughout his tenure in the Senate. In his last years in the Senate, he gave up his chairmanship of the Commerce Committee to chair the Senate Appropriations Committee, as a result of the death of Senator John L. McClellan. Magnuson served most of his Senate tenure alongside his friend and colleague from Washington state, Henry M. "Scoop" Jackson. Republican State Attorney General Slade Gorton defeated Magnuson in the 1980 election.

In 1948, Magnuson called for the establishment of a Jewish state in Palestine.

Magnuson was responsible for special legislation in 1949 that allowed Poon Lim, a Chinese sailor who in 1942 survived 133 days alone at sea as a castaway, to immigrate to the U.S. and become a citizen.

In August 1950, Magnuson proposed voluntary enlistment for the Japanese in the American armed forces and sent a cable request to General Douglas MacArthur on the practicality of the proposal.

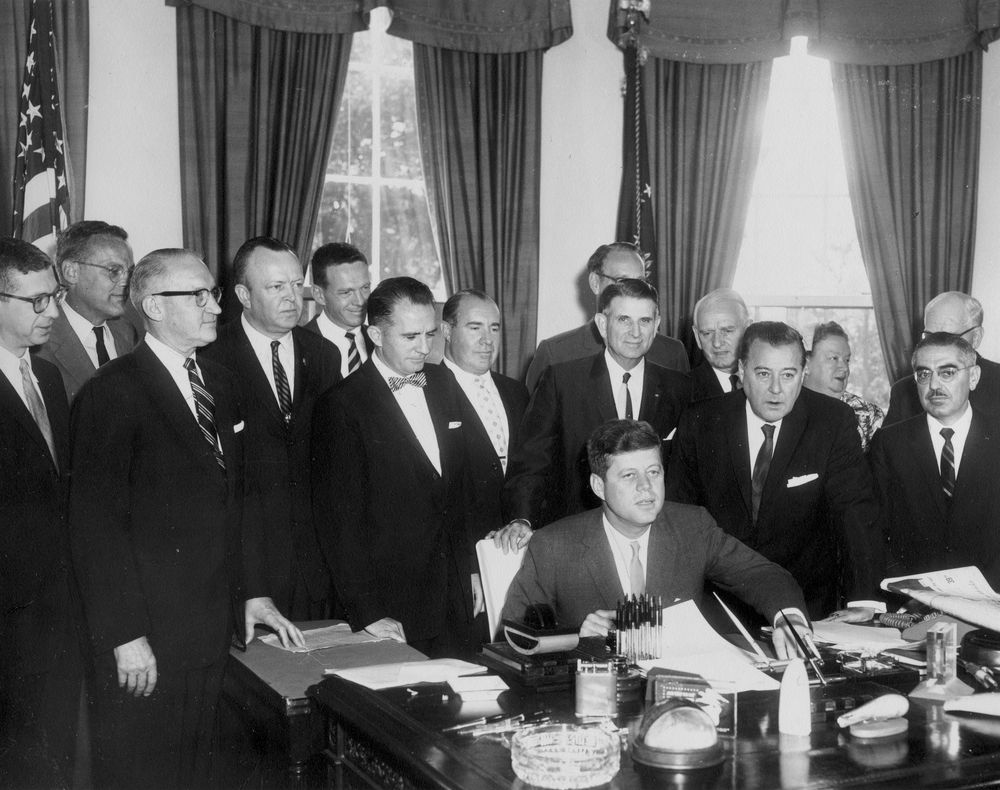
President John F. Kennedy (seated) prepares to sign the S-610 Act, establishing the United States Travel Service within the Department of Commerce, June 29, 1961. Leaning over his shoulder is Magnuson.

In November 1961, President John F. Kennedy visited Seattle and was an honored guest at a celebration honoring Magnuson's first 25 years in Congress. Nearly 3,000 people paid $100 each to attend the dinner.

The bill that became the Civil Rights Act of 1964 was referred to the Committee on Commerce. Magnuson played a key role in getting it to the floor and enacted into law despite vigorous opposition by Senator William Fulbright and other segregationists.

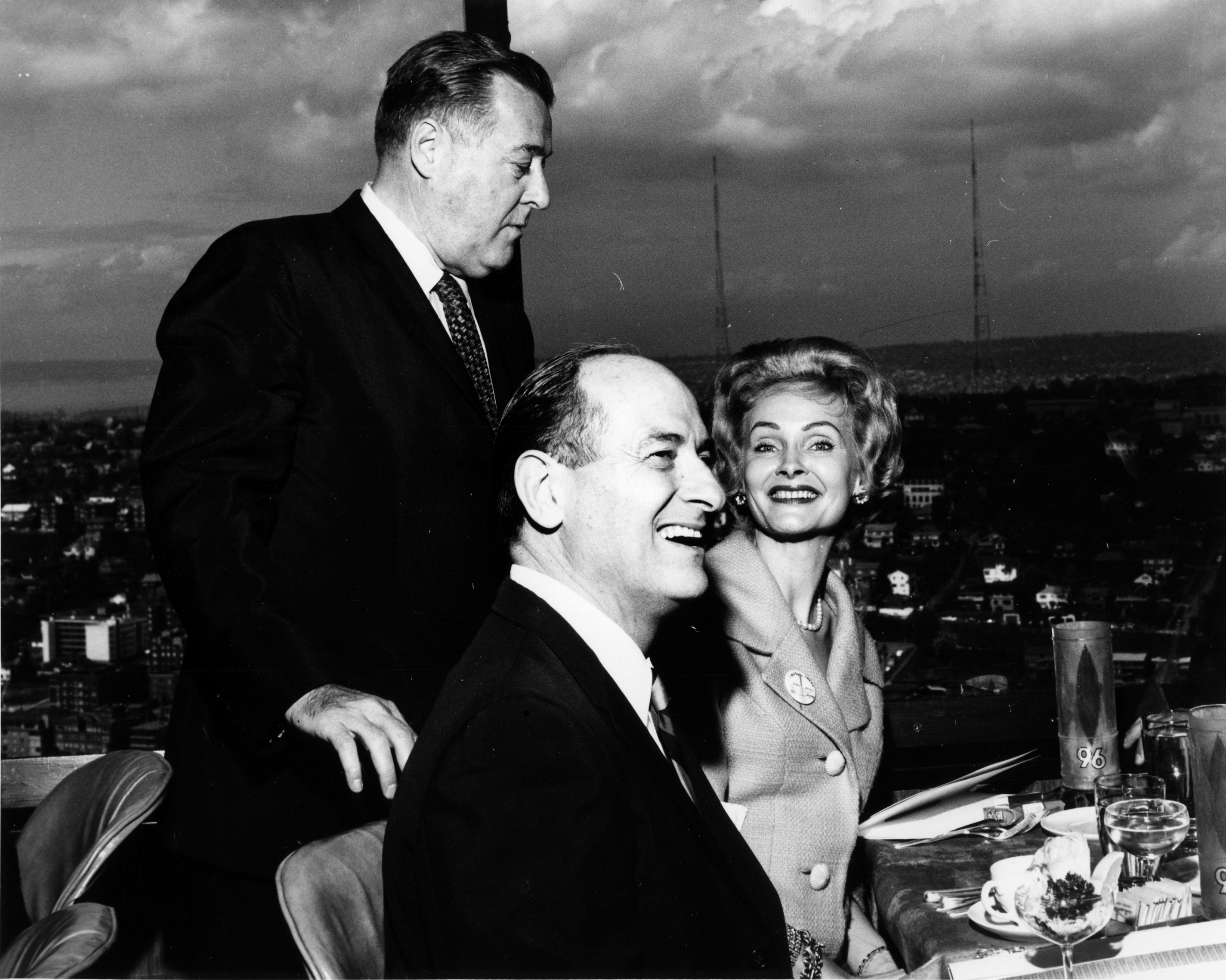
Magnuson (standing) dines with Washington Governor Albert Rosellini and his wife Ethel at the Seattle Space Needle restaurant on opening day, April 21, 1962.

At the end of August 1966, after President Lyndon Johnson announced the nominations of Charles F. Luce for Undersecretary of the Interior, John A. Carver for Federal Power Commission membership, and David S. Black for BPA administrator, Magnuson announced the Senate Commerce committee would hold hearings on Carver's nomination on September 1. He called Luce "one of the most able, dedicated, productive public servants I know."

On November 7, 1967, Johnson signed the Public Broadcasting Act of 1967, citing Magnuson as one of the members of Congress to "have been part of the team that has brought this measure to the White House to make it the law of our land."

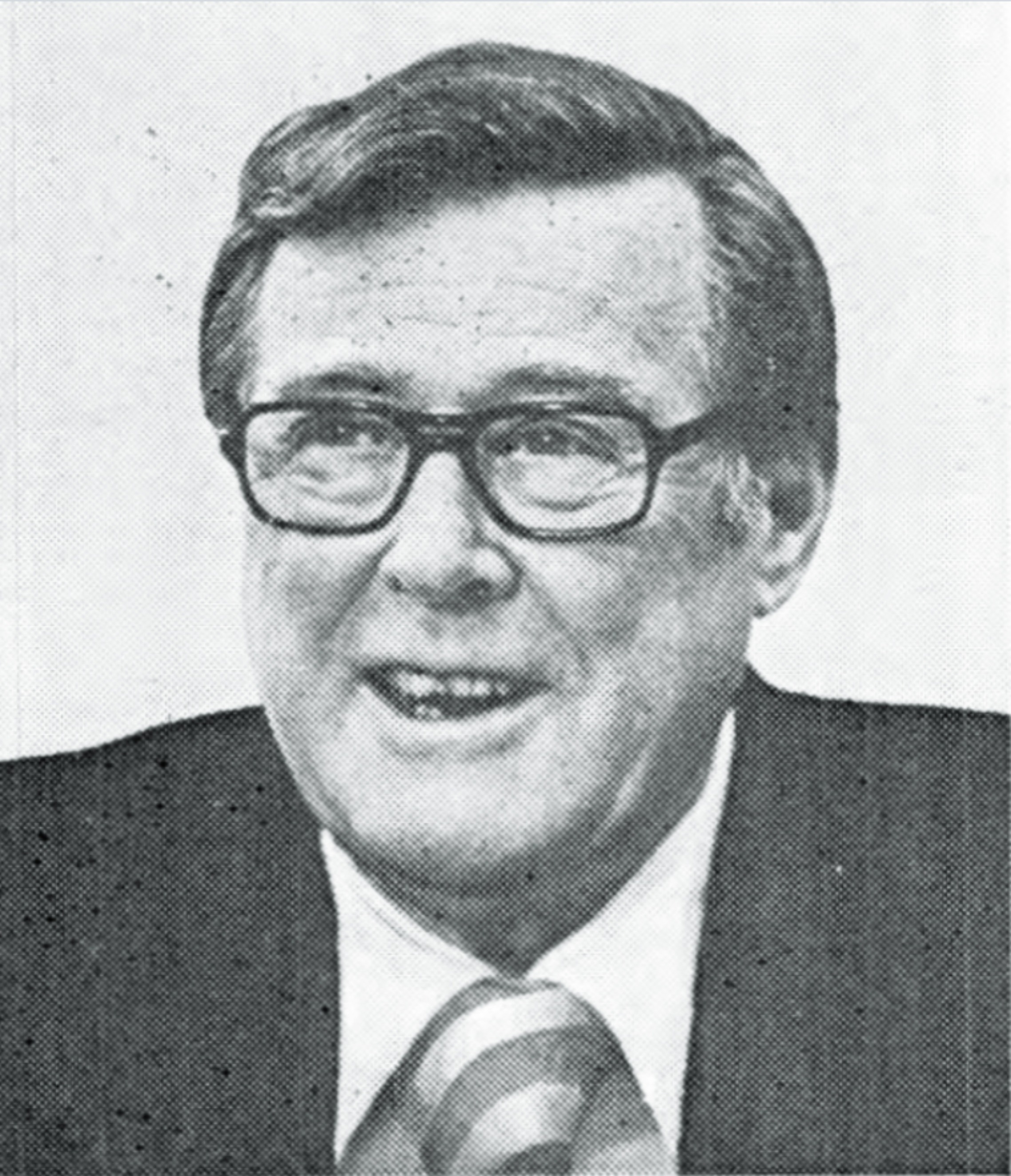
Magnuson in 1975

Magnuson attended the May 5, 1978, dedication ceremony for Riverfront Park in Spokane. Shortly after that, during a town hall meeting, President Jimmy Carter said, "No one could be in a better political position than to be preceded and introduced by men like Tom Foley and Senator Warren Magnuson. I know of no one in the Congress than these two men who are more respected, more dedicated to serving their own people well, but who have also reached, because of their experience and knowledge, sound judgment and commitment, a position of national and even international renown and leadership."

=== Legacy ===
At least four important pieces of legislation bear Magnuson's name: the Magnuson-Stevens Fishery Conservation and Management Act, the Chinese Exclusion Repeal Act (Magnuson Act of 1943), the Magnuson-Moss Warranty Act, and the Magnuson Act of 1950 (46 U.S.C. § 70051). He was also instrumental in keeping supertankers out of Puget Sound, by attaching an amendment to a routine funding reauthorization bill on the Senate and House consent calendars.

== Later years and death ==
After his defeat for reelection, Magnuson kept active in politics. He had been part of a U.N.-sponsored organization to study nuclear proliferation and lobbied the legislature to pass a flat tax for schools.

In his later years, Magnuson was beset by health problems. In 1982, he underwent surgery due to a diabetic condition, which saw several of the toes on his left foot amputated. As the decade progressed, Magnuson's public presence dwindled appreciably. On May 20, 1989, Magnuson died from complications of diabetes and congestive heart failure at his Seattle home. He and his wife are interred in Acacia Memorial Park in Lake Forest Park, north of Seattle.

== Personal life ==
In 1928, Magnuson married Eleanor Peggy "Peggins" Maddieux, crowned Miss Seattle the previous year. They remained together until their divorce in 1935. Magnuson dated several glamorous women, including heiress and cover girl June Millarde and actress Carole Parker. In 1964, he married Jermaine Elliott Peralta (1923–2011), widowed as a teenager, in a ceremony conducted by Rev. Frederick Brown Harris at the Omni Shoreham Hotel. The couple remained together until his death, and he helped raise Peralta's daughter from her previous marriage, Juanita.

== Namesakes ==
- Warren G. Magnuson Health Sciences Building at the University of Washington's Health Sciences building complex was named in his honor in 1970.
- Warren Magnuson's Senate desk is located in an alcove in the Suzzallo Library graduate reading room at the University of Washington.
- Warren G. Magnuson Clinical Center at the National Institutes of Health in Bethesda, Maryland is also named for Senator Warren Magnuson.
- Warren G. Magnuson Park in northeast Seattle was named in his honor in 1977.
- Warren G. Magnuson Puget Sound Legacy Award has been established by the People For Puget Sound
- The Washington State Democratic Party holds an annual Magnuson awards dinner (sometimes referred to as the Maggies, per his nickname).
- The Intercollegiate College of Nursing building in Spokane on Fort George Wright Drive near Spokane Falls Community College is named after him.

== Related reading ==
- Scates, Shelby Warren G. Magnuson and the Shaping of Twentieth-Century America (Seattle: University of Washington Press, 1997)

Party political offices
Preceded by Homer Bone	Democratic nominee for U.S. Senator from Washington (Class 3); 1944, 1950, 1956, 1962, 1968, 1974, 1980	Succeeded by Brock Adams
U.S. House of Representatives
Preceded by Marion Zioncheck	Member of the U.S. House of Representatives from Washington's 1st congressional district January 3, 1937 – December 13, 1944	Succeeded by Emerson DeLacy
U.S. Senate
Preceded by Homer T. Bone	U.S. senator (Class 3) from Washington; December 14, 1944 – January 3, 1981; Served alongside: Monrad C. Wallgren, Hugh B. Mitchell, Harry P. Cain, Henry M. Jackson	Succeeded by Slade Gorton
Political offices
Preceded by John W. Bricker	Chairman of the Senate Commerce Committee; 1955–1977	Succeeded by Howard Cannon
Preceded by John L. McClellan	Chairman of Senate Appropriations Committee; 1977–1981	Succeeded by Mark O. Hatfield
Preceded by James O. Eastland	President pro tempore of the United States Senate; 1978–1980	Succeeded by Milton Young
Preceded by Milton Young	President pro tempore of the United States Senate; 1980–1981	Succeeded by Strom Thurmond
Honorary titles
Preceded by James O. Eastland	Dean of the United States Senate; December 27, 1978 – January 3, 1981	Succeeded by John C. Stennis
