= Chris Strow =

American politician from Washington

Member of the Washington House of Representatives from the 10th, Position 1 district
- In office January 3, 2005 – December 8, 2007
- Preceded by: Barry Sehlin
- Succeeded by: Norma Smith

Personal details
- Party: Republican
- Spouse: Mary Strow
- Occupation: Politician
- Other name: Christopher Strow

Chris Strow is an American politician from Washington. Strow is a former Republican member of Washington House of Representatives for District 10 from 2005 to 2007.

== Career ==
On November 2, 2004, Strow won the election and became a Republican member of Washington House of Representatives for District 10, Position 1. Strow defeated Nancy I. Conard and Tom Bronkema with 50.07% of the votes. Strow hired Gina Bull, a Democrat, as his legislative aide. On November 7, 2006, as an incumbent, Strow won the election unopposed, and continued serving Washington House of Representatives District 10, Position 1.

In December 2007, Strow resigned as a member of Washington House of Representatives District 10, Position 1. Strow became a principal economic policy analyst for Puget Sound Regional Council. In January 2008, Strow's District 10, Position 1 seat was succeeded by Norma Smith.

== Personal life ==
Strow's wife is Mary Strow. They have one child. Strow and his family lived in Freeland, Washington. In 2008, Strow and his family live in Seattle, Washington.
