= Robert L. Charette =

American politician

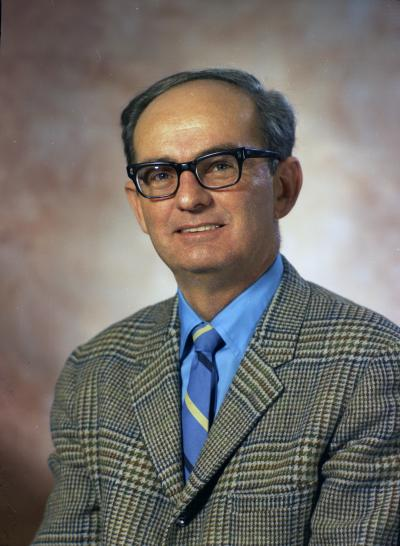
- Charette in 1971

Majority Leader of the Washington House of Representatives
- In office January 8, 1973 – January 10, 1977
- Preceded by: Stewart Bledsoe
- Succeeded by: Dick King

Member of the Washington House of Representatives for the 19th district
- In office 1967–1979

Member of the Washington State Senate for the 21st district
- In office 1963–1967

Personal details
- Born: January 6, 1923 Aberdeen, Washington, United States
- Died: January 16, 1988 (aged 65) Seattle, Washington, United States
- Party: Democratic

Robert L. Charette (January 6, 1923 – January 16, 1988) was an American politician in the state of Washington. He served in the Washington House of Representatives from 1967 to 1979 and in the Senate from 1963 to 1967.
