= J. T. Ledgerwood =

American politician

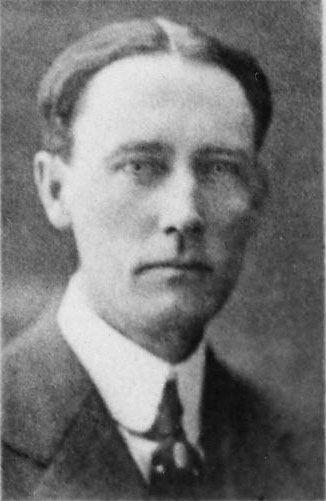
- Ledgerwood in 1917

Member of the Washington House of Representatives for the 10th district
- In office 1917–1931; 1931–1939

Personal details
- Born: May 4, 1879 Pomeroy, Washington, United States
- Died: November 19, 1976 (aged 97) Pomeroy, Washington, United States
- Party: Democratic

John Timothy Ledgerwood (May 4, 1879 – November 19, 1976) was an American politician in the state of Washington. He served in the Washington House of Representatives.
