= Mary Margaret Haugen =

American politician (born 1941)

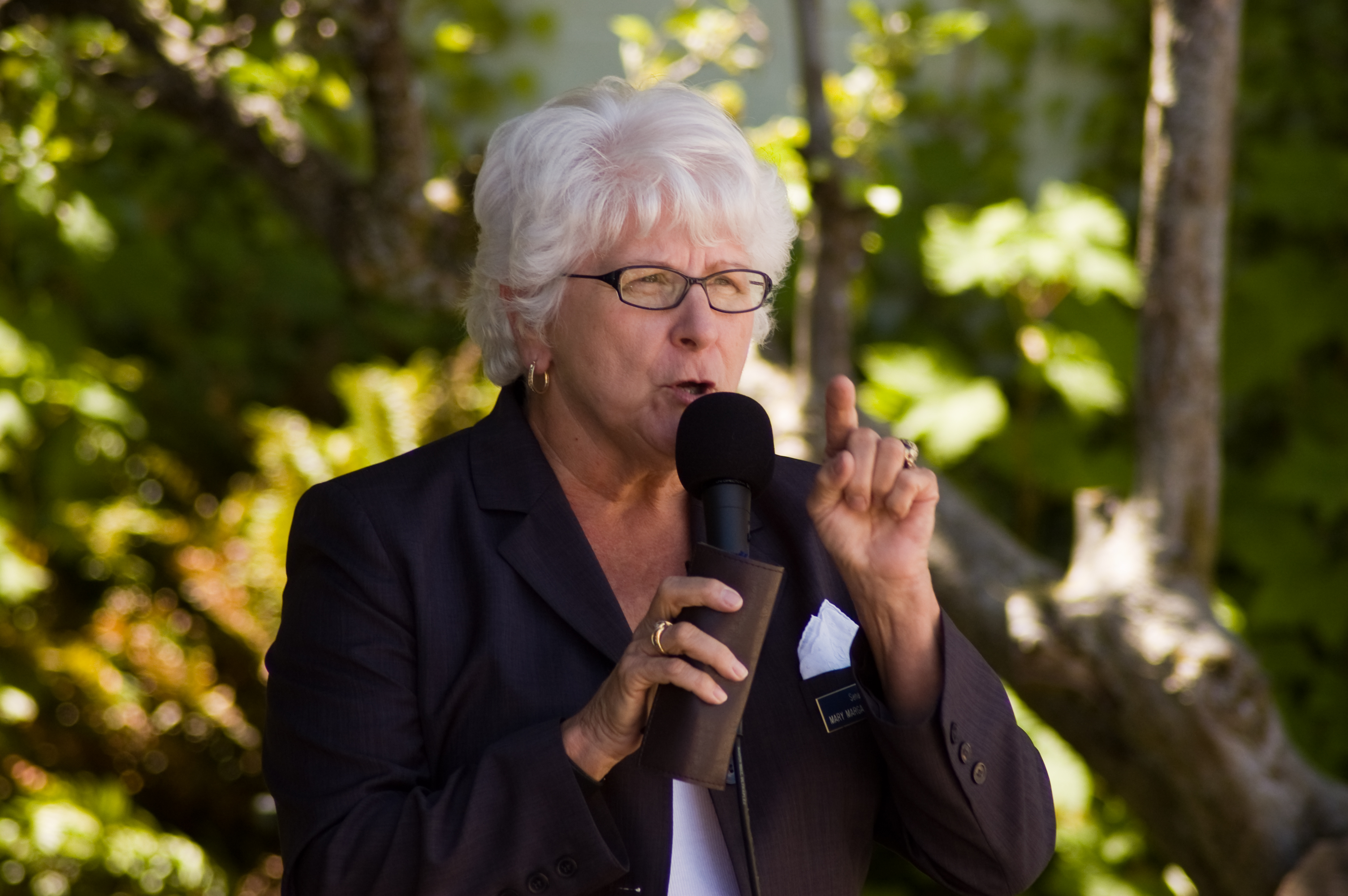
- Speaking at a 2008 campaign rally

Member of the Washington Senate from the 10th district
- In office January 11, 1993 – January 14, 2013
- Preceded by: Jack Metcalf
- Succeeded by: Barbara Bailey

Member of the Washington House of Representatives from the 10th district
- In office January 10, 1982 – January 11, 1993
- Preceded by: Joan Houchen
- Succeeded by: Barbara Bailey

Personal details
- Born: Mary Margaret Haugen; January 14, 1941 (age 85) Camano Island, Washington, U.S.
- Party: Democratic

Mary Margaret Haugen (born January 14, 1941) is an American politician. She was a Washington state senator from 1993 to 2013 and served chairwoman of the Senate Transportation Committee.

From 1982 to 1992, Haugen served in the Washington House of Representatives. Before that, she served three terms as a member of the Stanwood School Board.

Haugen is married and lives on Camano Island. She is a Democrat.

== 2012 Election ==
In the 2012 race for her State Senate seat, Haugen lost by 5% to Republican Barbara Bailey.
