= Reagan's coattails =

Influence of Ronald Reagan's popularity in elections other than his own

Reagan's coattails refers to the influence of Ronald Reagan's popularity in elections other than his own, after the American political expression to "ride in on another's coattails". Chiefly, it refers to the "Reagan Revolution" accompanying his 1980 election to the U.S. presidency. This victory was accompanied by the change of twelve seats in the United States Senate from Democratic to Republican hands, producing a Republican majority in the Senate for the first time since 1954.

Possibly best known was the defeat of Democratic South Dakota Senator George McGovern, a prominent progressive Democrat who had been the party's nominee for president in 1972. McGovern lost his bid for a fourth term by a resounding 19-point margin to Republican Representative James Abdnor.

== 1980 Senate Democratic losses ==
The Democratic losses in the Senate in 1980 were:

1. Alabama: Donald W. Stewart (first elected in 1978) lost in the Democratic primary to Jim Folsom, Jr. Folsom lost the general election to Jeremiah Denton.
2. Alaska: Mike Gravel (first elected in 1968) lost in the Democratic primary to Clark Gruening. Gruening lost the general election to Frank Murkowski.
3. Florida: Richard B. Stone (first elected in 1974) lost in the Democratic primary to Bill Gunter. Gunter lost the general election to Paula Hawkins.
4. Georgia: Herman Talmadge (first elected in 1956) lost to Mack Mattingly.
5. Idaho: Frank Church (first elected in 1956) lost to Steve Symms.
6. Indiana: Birch Bayh (first elected in 1962) lost to Dan Quayle.
7. Iowa: John Culver (first elected in 1974) lost to Chuck Grassley.
8. New Hampshire: John A. Durkin (first elected in 1975) lost to Warren Rudman. Durkin resigned his seat in December and Rudman was appointed to fill out the remaining few days of Durkin's term.
9. North Carolina: Robert Burren Morgan (first elected in 1974) lost to John P. East.
10. South Dakota: George McGovern (first elected in 1962) lost to James Abdnor.
11. Washington: Warren Magnuson (first elected in 1944) lost to Slade Gorton.
12. Wisconsin: Gaylord Nelson (first elected in 1962) lost to Bob Kasten.

== 1986 and beyond ==
Notably, the bulk of the 1980 class of Senate Republicans failed to hold their seats for the Republican party beyond one term. In the 1986 elections, the Democrats managed to recapture the majority in the Senate, largely thanks to the defeat of several members of the Reagan class of 1980:

- In South Dakota, Abdnor was challenged in the Republican primary by Governor Bill Janklow. He survived the tough primary fight, but lost in the general election to Democrat Tom Daschle, who became Democratic Senate leader and held on to the seat until 2004, when he was unseated by Republican John Thune.
- In Washington, Gorton was unseated by Democrat Brock Adams. Gorton later won Washington's other Senate seat in 1988 and 1994 before losing re-election again in 2000.
- In Wisconsin, Kasten was reelected in 1986, but was defeated in 1992 by Democrat Russ Feingold. Feingold himself was defeated in 2010 by conservative businessman Ron Johnson.
- In Florida, Hawkins lost her bid for reelection to Democrat Bob Graham, who held the seat until his retirement in 2004, when Republican Mel Martinez was elected to replace him.
- In Alabama, Denton lost his reelection bid to Democrat Richard C. Shelby. However, after the Republicans retook the Senate in 1994, Shelby switched parties, returning the seat to Republican hands.

Democrats won three more seats in 1986, but these have since shown instability, alternating between the parties and in one case between senators:

- In Georgia, Mattingly lost to Democrat Wyche Fowler in 1986. Fowler then lost to Republican Paul Coverdell in 1992 and Coverdell won reelection in 1998. Upon Coverdell's death in 2000, Democrat Zell Miller was appointed to the seat and won a special election that year to finish the rest of the term. Miller did not seek reelection in 2004, and was succeeded by Republican Johnny Isakson. Isakson resigned in 2019 and was replaced by Kelly Loeffler. Loeffler lost the election to finish Isakson's term to Democrat Raphael Warnock.
- In North Carolina, after East committed suicide in 1986, fellow Republican Jim Broyhill was appointed to fill out his term. This seat switched partisan hands in three consecutive elections. Broyhill was defeated by Democrat Terry Sanford in 1986, Sanford was unseated by Republican Lauch Faircloth in 1992, Democrat John Edwards defeated Faircloth in 1998, and Republican Richard Burr won it in 2004 after Edwards retired to become the Democratic nominee for Vice President.
- In Indiana, Quayle won reelection in 1986, and after he resigned to become Vice President in 1988, fellow Republican Dan Coats was appointed to replace him. Coats won a special election in 1990 to fill the rest of Quayle's term, and then won a full term in 1992. In 1998, Coats declined to run for a second full term and Democrat Evan Bayh (the son of Birch Bayh, whom Quayle had unseated in 1980) was elected to fill the seat. However, in 2010 Bayh also retired after two terms and was succeeded by Coats. In 2016, Coats did not seek reelection, and Bayh ran for his old seat, but lost the general election to Republican Todd Young.

One other freshmen Republican Senator, Mark Andrews of North Dakota, lost reelection in 1986, to Kent Conrad, but he had succeeded a retiring Republican, Milton Young.

Speaker of the House Paul Ryan referred to the Republican majority in 2016's Senate and House elections as being "saved" by then-President-elect Donald Trump's coattails.

== Other races ==
Reagan's coattails also affected other elections in 1980, including gubernatorial ones, most prominently the defeat of first term Governor of Arkansas and future President of the United States Bill Clinton by Frank D. White. Nevertheless, Clinton regained the Governorship in a 1982 rematch and held until his election to the Presidency in 1992. In a speech delivered at the 2016 Democratic National Convention, Clinton referenced the effect of Reagan as the reason for his defeat in 1980. Other Democratic governors who lost were Joseph P. Teasdale of Missouri, who lost to former governor Kit Bond in a rematch of the 1976 election, and Arthur A. Link of North Dakota, who lost to Allen I. Olson, who only served one term before losing reelection to George A. Sinner. Another Democratic governor, Dixy Lee Ray of Washington, lost renomination to Jim McDermott, who lost the general election to John Spellman, who served one term until he lost reelection to Booth Gardner.
