= 1980 United States Senate election in Washington =

- November 4, 1980
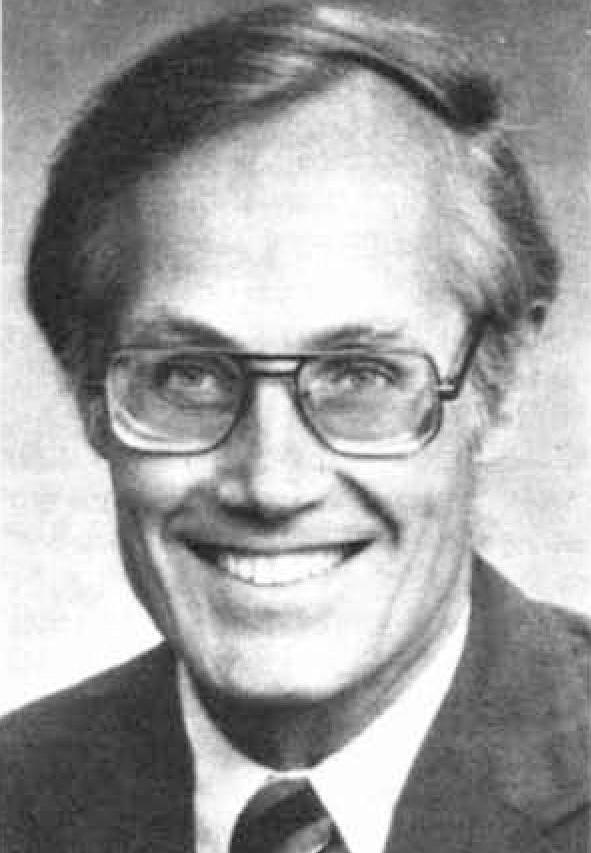

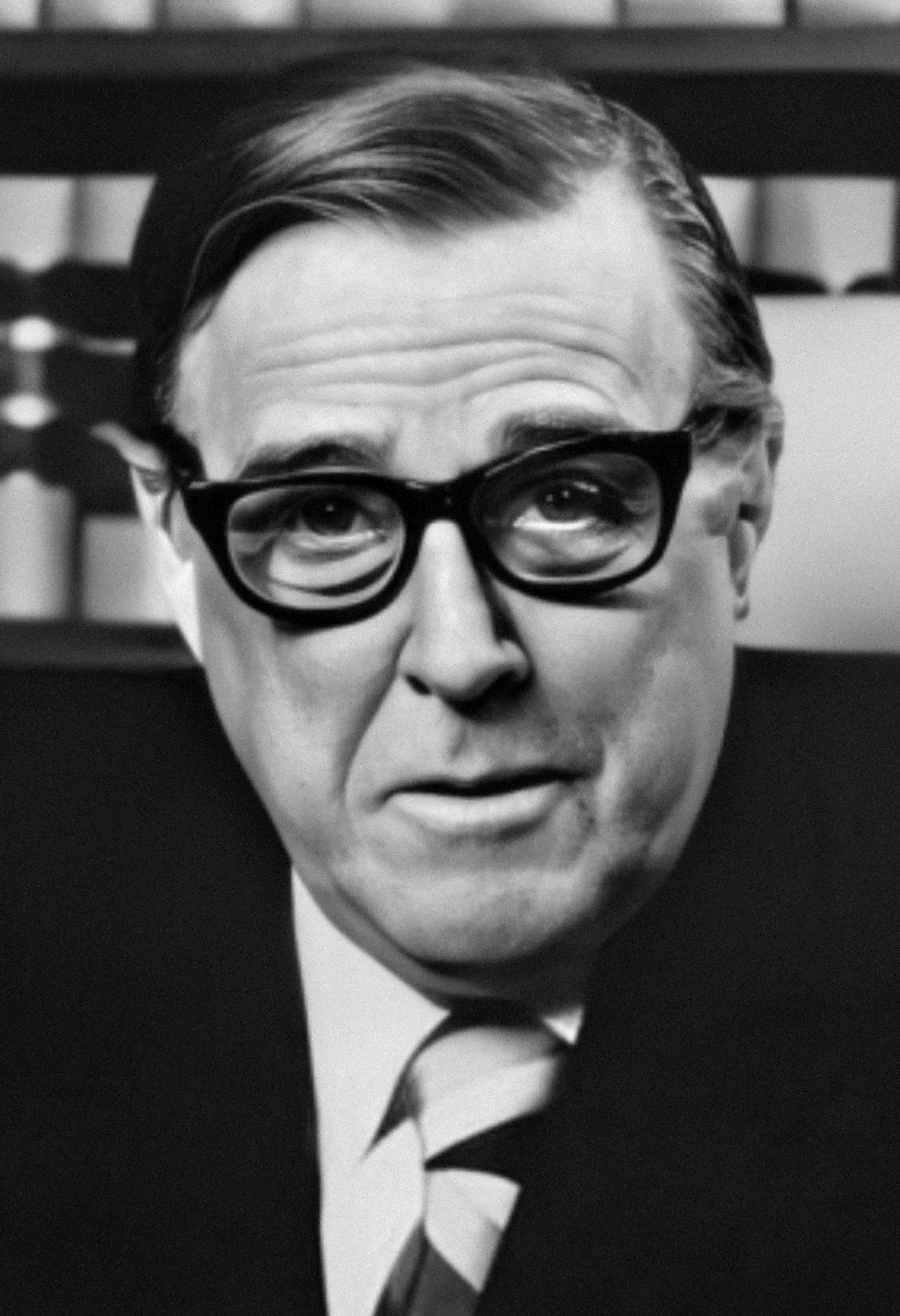
Nominee	Slade Gorton	Warren Magnuson
Party	Republican	Democratic
Popular vote	936,317	792,052
Percentage	54.17%	45.83%
- County results Gorton: 50–60% 60–70% Magnuson: 50–60%
U.S. senator before election
Warren Magnuson
Democratic
Elected U.S. Senator
Slade Gorton
Republican

The 1980 United States Senate election in Washington was held on November 4, 1980. Longtime incumbent Democratic U.S. Senator Warren Magnuson, the Senate President pro tempore, ran for a seventh term in office but lost re-election to Republican State Attorney General Slade Gorton. Magnuson was the most senior U.S. senator to lose re-election until Ted Stevens' defeat in 2008. Gorton was one of the dozen Republicans who beat Democrats to seize control of the Senate fueled by Ronald Reagan's landslide victory. As of 2026, this was the only time since 1926 that Republicans won Washington's Class 3 Senate seat, and after losing re-election to this seat in 1986, Gorton later won Washington's other Senate seat in 1988 and 1994 before losing re-election again in 2000.

== Background ==
Heading into the 1980 election cycle, Magnuson entered the campaign with certain advantages. One such advantage was his seniority, a theme he ran heavily on in his 1974 campaign. In the following years, his status grew, with him becoming head of the powerful Senate Appropriations Committee upon the death of its chairman John L. McClellan. Furthermore, Magnuson had not faced a close contest since 1962, and heading into the election, Magnuson was largely seen as the favorite. However, the national environment of 1980 heavily favored Republicans, meaning many seats were set to be vulnerable.

Magnuson's challenger was Slade Gorton, the three-term incumbent Attorney General of Washington. Before that, he was a State Representative who rose to become Majority Leader of the Washington House of Representatives. Gorton was Magnuson's first challenger to hold a statewide office since 1956 when he faced former Governor Arthur B. Langlie. However, Magnuson was still a fixture of Washington state politics, and Gorton faced long odds.

== Blanket primary ==
=== Candidates ===
==== Democratic ====
- Warren Magnuson, incumbent U.S. Senator
- James Sherwood Stokes
- John "Hugo Frye" Patric, writer

==== Republican ====
- Slade Gorton, State Attorney General
- Lloyd E. Cooney, former KIRO-TV commentator
- William McCallum

==== Libertarian ====
- Richard K. Kenney

While Magnuson only faced token Democratic opposition, Gorton was met with shock resistance from a last-minute primary challenge from TV commentator Lloyd E. Cooney. Cooney was a more conservative candidate, and challenged Gorton for his moderate stances, questioning his support for Ronald Reagan and claiming he wouldn't be able to defeat Magnuson. Gorton shook off these claims and believed Cooney's challenge could only help him. However, Cooney was seen by many in Washington state as a formidable challenger, who could have beaten Gorton, owing to recognition from TV. Despite this, Gorton beat Cooney and received his endorsement against Magnuson.

=== Results ===
Blanket primary results
Party	Candidate	Votes	%
Democratic	Warren Magnuson (incumbent)	348,471	36.58%
Republican	Slade Gorton	313,560	32.91%
Republican	Lloyd E. Cooney	229,178	24.05%
Democratic	James Sherwood Stokes	18,348	1.93%
Republican	William McCallum	13,736	1.44%
Democratic	John Patric	10,157	1.07%
Libertarian	Richard K. Kenney	7,951	0.84%
Total votes		941,401	100.00%

== General election ==
=== Candidates ===
- Warren Magnuson (D), incumbent U.S. Senator
- Slade Gorton (R), State Attorney General

=== Campaign ===
Magnuson's showing in the primary had been considered by some to be weak, with Gorton pointing out that he failed to get a majority. It had become increasingly clear that the election was not going to be an easy one for Magnuson. Nevertheless, he was still the favorite by virtue of leading in polls, sometimes by as much as 11 points, and leading heavily in fundraising. Magnuson generally tried to avoid mentioning Gorton, refusing to debate him, and centered his campaign on the theme of his seniority and power. An example of this was when the Mount St. Helens eruption happened, which gave Magnuson an opportunity to display his appropriations prowess in constructing a bill.

Gorton tried to counteract this by focusing his campaign on the issues of inflation and energy. Notably, he took the issues to turn Magnuson's seniority against him, blaming the nation's inflation on him. Moreover, Gorton ran a vigorous and aggressive campaign, which stood in contrast to the more senior Magnuson. Age, while not a major campaign issue, became a subtle undercurrent, with Gorton ads and newspaper stories about Magnuson's health drawing attention to the age difference between the two candidates.

Despite Magnuson's advantages at the start of the race, the closing days of the race saw it grow closer. A late poll showed Gorton leading Magnuson, a reversal of trends showing Gorton far behind. Gorton defeated Magnuson in an upset, for which a large factor was due to Ronald Reagan's sizable victory over Jimmy Carter in that year's presidential race. The coattails of Reagan's victory, in general, allowed strong Republican performances in Washington and other states nationwide.

=== Results ===
1980 United States Senate election in Washington
Party	Candidate	Votes	%
Republican	Slade Gorton	936,317	54.17%
Democratic	Warren Magnuson (incumbent)	792,052	45.83%
Total votes		1,728,369	100.00%
Republican gain from Democratic			

==== By county ====
County results
County	Warren Magnuson Democratic		Slade Gorton Republican		Margin		Total votes
County	#	%	#	%	#	%	Total votes
Adams	1,511	31.59%	3,272	68.41%	1,761	36.82%	4,783
Asotin	3,217	48.32%	3,441	51.68%	224	3.36%	6,658
Benton	19,655	44.18%	24,837	55.82%	5,182	11.65%	44,492
Chelan	7,183	37.34%	12,054	62.66%	4,871	25.32%	19,237
Clallam	9,573	43.03%	12,676	56.97%	3,103	13.95%	22,249
Clark	34,888	48.81%	36,593	51.19%	1,705	2.39%	71,481
Columbia	731	36.37%	1,279	63.63%	548	27.26%	2,010
Cowlitz	15,333	55.57%	12,261	44.43%	-3,072	-11.13%	27,594
Douglas	3,183	36.40%	5,562	63.60%	2,379	27.20%	8,745
Ferry	970	48.62%	1,025	51.38%	55	2.76%	1,995
Franklin	5,176	44.03%	6,579	55.97%	1,403	11.94%	11,755
Garfield	555	38.07%	903	61.93%	348	23.87%	1,458
Grant	6,905	38.97%	10,812	61.03%	3,907	22.05%	17,717
Grays Harbor	14,196	54.48%	11,861	45.52%	-2,335	-8.96%	26,057
Island	7,248	40.00%	10,871	60.00%	3,623	20.00%	18,119
Jefferson	4,168	51.95%	3,855	48.05%	-313	-3.90%	8,023
King	286,096	48.15%	308,050	51.85%	21,954	3.70%	594,146
Kitsap	32,916	54.22%	27,797	45.78%	-5,119	-8.43%	60,713
Kittitas	4,381	41.71%	6,122	58.29%	1,741	16.58%	10,503
Klickitat	2,850	47.92%	3,097	52.08%	247	4.15%	5,947
Lewis	7,809	34.21%	15,020	65.79%	7,211	31.59%	22,829
Lincoln	1,924	35.80%	3,451	64.20%	1,527	28.41%	5,375
Mason	6,212	45.22%	7,525	54.78%	1,313	9.56%	13,737
Okanogan	5,298	42.53%	7,160	57.47%	1,862	14.95%	12,458
Pacific	4,336	54.00%	3,694	46.00%	-642	-8.00%	8,030
Pend Oreille	1,517	40.85%	2,197	59.15%	680	18.31%	3,714
Pierce	83,891	48.44%	89,286	51.56%	5,395	3.12%	173,177
San Juan	1,903	39.49%	2,916	60.51%	1,013	21.02%	4,819
Skagit	13,637	44.29%	17,150	55.71%	3,513	11.41%	30,787
Skamania	1,552	53.01%	1,376	46.99%	-176	-6.01%	2,928
Snohomish	61,255	45.00%	74,862	55.00%	13,607	10.00%	136,117
Spokane	55,587	39.20%	86,210	60.80%	30,623	21.60%	141,797
Stevens	3,886	33.71%	7,643	66.29%	3,757	32.59%	11,529
Thurston	23,996	43.71%	30,900	56.29%	6,904	12.58%	54,896
Wahkiakum	856	51.20%	816	48.80%	-40	-2.39%	1,672
Walla Walla	6,913	36.66%	11,944	63.34%	5,031	26.68%	18,857
Whatcom	20,715	45.17%	25,148	54.83%	4,433	9.67%	45,863
Whitman	7,119	41.84%	9,896	58.16%	2,777	16.32%	17,015
Yakima	22,911	38.78%	36,176	61.22%	13,265	22.45%	59,087
Totals	792,052	45.83%	936,317	54.17%	144,265	8.35%	1,728,369

== See also ==
- 1980 United States Senate elections
