= John E. Cunningham =

American politician (1931–2025)

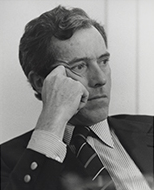

Member of the U.S. House of Representatives from Washington's 7th district
- In office May 17, 1977 – January 3, 1979
- Preceded by: Brock Adams
- Succeeded by: Mike Lowry

Member of the Washington Senate from the 33rd district
- In office January 13, 1975 – January 10, 1977
- Preceded by: Frank Connor
- Succeeded by: Eric Rohrbach

Member of the Washington House of Representatives from the 33rd district
- In office January 8, 1973 – January 13, 1975
- Preceded by: John L. O'Brien
- Succeeded by: Eleanor Lee

Personal details
- Born: John Edward Cunningham III; March 27, 1931 Chicago, Illinois, U.S.
- Died: March 28, 2025 (aged 94) Seattle, Washington, U.S.
- Party: Republican
- Spouse: Margaret Catherine Snyder (m. 1954; died 2021)
- Children: 9
- Education: University of San Francisco; Seattle University
- Profession: Businessman

John Edward "Jack" Cunningham III (March 27, 1931 – March 28, 2025) was an American politician from the state of Washington. A member of the Republican Party, he served in both houses of the Washington State Legislature as a member of Washington House of Representatives from 1973 to 1975 and a member of the Washington Senate from 1975 to 1977 representing Washington's 33rd legislative district, and a member of the United States House of Representatives for less than one full term representing Washington's 7th congressional district from 1977 to 1979. He was one of only two Republican U.S. House of Representatives members who represented the state's 7th congressional district.

== Biography ==
Prior to his service in the U.S. House, Cunningham served in the Washington House of Representatives from 1973 to 1975, and after that in the Washington State Senate from 1975 to 1977. He served in the United States Air Force Reserve in 1953 and 1954. Cunningham resided in Des Moines, Washington.

While working in the California city of San Francisco, he met his wife, the former Margaret Catherine "Maggie" Snyder, and they married on July 24, 1954, her sister Catharine's 31st birthday in Tacoma, Washington. Together, they had nine children and 24 grandchildren. Margaret Cunningham died on November 3, 2021.

Cunningham died in Seattle on March 28, 2025, one day after his 94th birthday.

=== Congress ===
Cunningham was elected as a Republican member to the vacancy for Washington's 7th congressional district in a special election after Brock Adams resigned to become United States Secretary of Transportation under President of the United States Jimmy Carter. Cunningham lost re-election in 1978, and served from May 17, 1977 to January 3, 1979.

U.S. House of Representatives
Preceded by Brock Adams	Member of the U.S. House of Representatives from Washington's 7th congressional district 1977–1979	Succeeded by Mike Lowry
U.S. order of precedence (ceremonial)
Preceded by Greg Lopez as former U.S. Representative	Order of precedence of the United States as former U.S. Representative	Succeeded by Bill Redmond as former U.S. Representative
