= 2020 United States presidential election in Washington (state) =

- November 3, 2020
- Turnout: 84.14% (of registered voters) (▲5.38 pp)

Nominee	Joe Biden	Donald Trump
Party	Democratic	Republican
Home state	Delaware	Florida
Running mate	Kamala Harris	Mike Pence
Electoral vote	12	0
Popular vote	2,369,612	1,584,651
Percentage	57.97%	38.77%

Biden
40–50%
50–60%
60–70%
70–80%
80–90%
90–100%
Trump
30–40%
40–50%
50–60%
60–70%
70–80%
80–90%
90–100%
Tie/No Data
President before election
Donald Trump
Republican
Elected President
Joe Biden
Democratic

The 2020 United States presidential election in Washington was held on Tuesday, November 3, 2020, as part of the 2020 United States presidential election in which all 50 U.S. states plus the District of Columbia participated. Washington voters chose electors to represent them in the Electoral College via a popular vote, pitting the Republican Party's nominee, incumbent President Donald Trump, and running mate Vice President Mike Pence against Democratic Party nominee, former Vice President Joe Biden, and his running mate California Senator Kamala Harris. Washington has 12 electoral votes in the Electoral College.

Prior to the election, most news organizations forecasted Washington as a state that Biden would win, or a safe blue state. Biden won the state by 19.2%, the largest margin for a presidential candidate of any party since 1964. He also flipped the swing county of Clallam. Biden also became the candidate with the highest vote total in the state's history, with 2,369,612 votes. This was the first time since 1988 that Washington voted to the left of Illinois.

The Seattle metropolitan area, home to almost two-thirds of the state's population, is overwhelmingly Democratic. Despite this, even if the votes from King, Snohomish, and Pierce counties were removed, Biden would have carried the state by over 4,000 votes. However, Trump won a considerable majority in outlying communities, garnering over 70% of the vote in rural counties such as Columbia. Eastern Washington is very rural and leans Republican, partly due to the strong tinge of social conservatism it shares with neighboring Idaho, a GOP stronghold. That said, Biden was able to improve on Clinton's margin in Whitman County—anchored by the college town of Pullman—increasing it from 4.1% in 2016 to 10.0% in 2020, the best performance for a Democrat in the county since 1936. In addition, he narrowed Trump's margin in Spokane County from 8.3% to 4.3%. Biden earned 75% of the vote in King County, home to Seattle. This was the largest margin by any candidate in a presidential race since the county's creation.

Per exit polls by the Associated Press, Biden's strength in Washington came from winning 57% of white voters, 71% among Latinos and 77% among Asian-Americans. Biden won 77% of irreligious voters, who comprised 34% of the electorate. Additionally, a majority of Native Americans in the state backed Biden with about 65%, with some tribes supporting Biden with over 80%. Biden also became the first Democrat since Washington's admission into the union to win the presidency without winning Mason County, the first Democrat since John F. Kennedy in 1960 to prevail without winning Cowlitz County, and the first Democrat since Woodrow Wilson in 1916 to prevail without winning Grays Harbor County and Pacific County.

== Primary elections ==
The primaries for the major parties were on March 10, 2020. On March 14, 2019, Governor Jay Inslee signed a bill moving the state's presidential primary up from May to the second Tuesday in March.

=== Republican primary ===
Donald Trump, Bill Weld, Joe Walsh, and Rocky de la Fuente had declared their candidacy for the Republican Party, but only Trump met all of the state party's criteria by the official deadline of January 21, 2020, for being included on the ballot. Thus Trump essentially ran unopposed in the Republican primary, and thus he received all of Washington's 43 delegates to the 2020 Republican National Convention.

2020 Washington Republican presidential primary
Candidate	Votes	%	Delegates
Donald Trump (incumbent)	684,239	100.00%	43
Total	684,239	100.00%	43

=== Democratic primary ===
A number of Democratic Party candidates ran or expressed interest in running. Additionally, Seattle-based billionaire Howard Schultz announced a potential bid as an independent in early 2019, but backed out in September of that year. The party's candidates included on the ballot at the deadline were Michael Bennet, Joe Biden, Michael Bloomberg, Cory Booker, Pete Buttigieg, John Delaney, Tulsi Gabbard, Amy Klobuchar, Deval Patrick, Bernie Sanders, Tom Steyer, Elizabeth Warren and Andrew Yang.

Popular vote share by county Biden—30–40% Biden—40–50% Sanders—30–40% Sanders—40–50%

2020 Washington Democratic presidential primary
Candidate	Votes	%	Delegates
Joe Biden	591,403	37.98	46
Bernie Sanders	570,039	36.60	43
Elizabeth Warren (withdrawn) (Note: Candidate withdrew after Super Tuesday when all-mail voting had already begun.)	142,652	9.16	
Michael Bloomberg (withdrawn)	122,530	7.87	
Pete Buttigieg (withdrawn) (Note: Candidate withdrew before Super Tuesday when all-mail voting had already begun.)	63,344	4.07	
Amy Klobuchar (withdrawn)	33,383	2.14	
Tulsi Gabbard	13,199	0.85	
Andrew Yang (withdrawn)	6,403	0.41	
Tom Steyer (withdrawn)	3,455	0.22	
Michael Bennet (withdrawn)	2,044	0.13	
Cory Booker (withdrawn)	1,314	0.08	
John Delaney (withdrawn)	573	0.04	
Deval Patrick (withdrawn)	508	0.03	
Uncommitted	6,450	0.41	
Total	1,557,297	100.00%	89

=== Green primary ===
As a minor party, Washington State's Green Party affiliate is excluded from the publicly funded Presidential Primary in Washington State. The Green Party of Washington facilitated its primary by a mail-in ballot to its members after its Spring Convention on May 23 (deadline was June 13).

All candidates recognized by the Green Party of the United States by April 23 were on the ballot, plus a write-in option:

- Howie Hawkins
- Dario Hunter
- David Rolde

== General election ==
=== Final predictions ===
Source	Ranking
The Cook Political Report	Solid D
Inside Elections	Solid D
Sabato's Crystal Ball	Safe D
Politico	Solid D
RCP	Likely D
Niskanen	Safe D
CNN	Solid D
The Economist	Safe D
CBS News	Likely D
270towin	Safe D
ABC News	Solid D
NPR	Likely D
NBC News	Solid D
538	Solid D

=== Polling ===
==== Graphical summary ====
View source data.

==== Aggregate polls ====
Source of poll aggregation	Dates administered	Dates updated	Joe Biden Democratic	Donald Trump Republican	Other/ Undecided (Note: Calculated by taking the difference of 100% and all other candidates combined.)	Margin
270 to Win	October 8–15, 2020	October 27, 2020	57.5%	35.5%	7.0%	Biden +22.0
FiveThirtyEight	until November 2, 2020	November 3, 2020	59.4%	36.4%	4.2%	Biden +23.0
Average			58.5%	36.0%	5.6%	Biden +22.5

==== Polls ====
Poll source	Date(s) administered	Sample size (Note: Key: A – all adults RV – registered voters LV – likely voters V – unclear)	Margin of error	Donald Trump Republican	Joe Biden Democratic	Jo Jorgensen Libertarian	Howie Hawkins Green	Other	Undecided
SurveyMonkey/Axios	Oct 20 – Nov 2, 2020	4,142 (LV)	± 2%	35% (Note: Overlapping sample with the previous SurveyMonkey/Axios poll, but more information available regarding sample size)	62%	–	–	–	–
Swayable	Oct 23 – Nov 1, 2020	489 (LV)	± 6%	39%	59%	2%	1%	–	–
SurveyMonkey/Axios	Oct 1–28, 2020	7,424 (LV)	–	36%	62%	–	–	–	–
PPP/NPI	Oct 14–15, 2020	610 (LV)	± 4%	37%	60%	–	–	–	2%
SurveyUSA/KING-TV	Oct 8–10, 2020	591 (LV)	± 5.2%	34%	55%	–	–	5% (Note: "Another candidate" with 5%)	5%
SurveyMonkey/Axios	Sep 1–30, 2020	7,953 (LV)	–	35%	64%	–	–	–	2%
Strategies 360	Sep 8–14, 2020	501 (RV)	± 4.4%	36%	58%	–	–	–	7% (Note: Includes "Refused")
SurveyMonkey/Axios	Aug 1–31, 2020	7,489 (LV)	–	37%	61%	–	–	–	2%
SurveyMonkey/Axios	Jul 1–31, 2020	7,691 (LV)	–	37%	62%	–	–	–	2%
SurveyUSA/KING-TV	Jul 22–27, 2020	534 (LV)	± 5.2%	28%	62%	–	–	6% (Note: "Another candidate" with 6%)	–
SurveyMonkey/Axios	Jun 8–30, 2020	3,939 (LV)	–	36%	62%	–	–	–	2%
Public Policy Polling/NPI	May 19–20, 2020	1,070 (LV)	± 3%	37%	59%	–	–	–	5%
SurveyUSA/KING-TV	May 16–19, 2020	530 (LV)	± 5.5%	31%	57%	–	–	5% (Note: "A candidate from another party" with 5%)	7%
EMC Research	Mar 31 – Apr 6, 2020	583 (A)	± 4.1%	39%	52%	–	–	–	9%
SurveyUSA/KING-TV	Mar 4–6, 2020	992 (RV)	± 3.8%	34%	57%	–	–	–	9%
Public Policy Polling/The Cascadia Advocate	Oct 22–23, 2019	900 (LV)	± 3.3%	37%	59%	–	–	–	3%
Zogby Interactive/JZ Analytics	Jul 22 – Aug 1, 2019	1,265 (LV)	± 2.8%	31%	52%	–	–	–	17%

Hypothetical polling

Donald Trump vs. Pete Buttigieg

Poll source	Date(s) administered	Sample size	Margin of error	Donald Trump (R)	Pete Buttigieg (D)	Undecided
Zogby Interactive/JZ Analytics	Jul 22 – Aug 1, 2019	1,265 (LV)	± 2.8%	32%	44%	24%

with Donald Trump and Kamala Harris

Poll source	Date(s) administered	Sample size	Margin of error	Donald Trump (R)	Kamala Harris (D)	Undecided
Zogby Interactive/JZ Analytics	Jul 22 – Aug 1, 2019	1,265 (LV)	± 2.8%	33%	47%	20%

Donald Trump vs. Bernie Sanders

Poll source	Date(s) administered	Sample size	Margin of error	Donald Trump (R)	Bernie Sanders (D)	Undecided
SurveyUSA/KING-TV	Mar 4–6, 2020	992 (RV)	± 3.8%	35%	56%	9%
Public Policy Polling/The Cascadia Advocate	Oct 22–23, 2019	900 (LV)	± 3.3%	37%	58%	6%
Zogby Interactive/JZ Analytics	Jul 22 – Aug 1, 2019	1,265 (LV)	± 2.8%	32%	54%	14%

Donald Trump vs. Elizabeth Warren

Poll source	Date(s) administered	Sample size	Margin of error	Donald Trump (R)	Elizabeth Warren (D)	Undecided
SurveyUSA/KING-TV	Mar 4–6, 2020	992 (RV)	± 3.8%	38%	52%	10%
Public Policy Polling/The Cascadia Advocate	Oct 22–23, 2019	900 (LV)	± 3.3%	37%	60%	3%
Zogby Interactive/JZ Analytics	Jul 22 – Aug 1, 2019	1,265 (LV)	± 2.8%	33%	48%	20%

with Donald Trump and generic Democrat

Poll source	Date(s) administered	Sample size	Margin of error	Donald Trump (R)	Generic Democrat	Undecided
Public Policy Polling	May 21–22, 2019	886 (LV)	± 3.3%	34%	59%	7%

=== Electoral slates ===
These slates of electors were nominated by each party in order to vote in the Electoral College should their candidate win the state:

Joe Biden and Kamala Harris Democratic Party	Donald Trump and Mike Pence Republican Party	Jo Jorgensen and Spike Cohen Libertarian Party	Howie Hawkins and Angela Walker Green Party	Gloria La Riva and Sunil Freeman Party for Socialism and Liberation	Alyson Kennedy and Malcolm Jarrett Socialist Workers Party
Martin Chaney; Jack Arends; Jackie Lane; Patsy Whitefoot; Nancy Monacelli; Julie Johnson; Sophia Danenberg; Jen Carter; Bryan Kesterson; Julian Wheeler; Santiago Ramos; Payton Swinford	Eric Rohrbach; Timothy Hazelo; Ronald Averill; Richard Bilskis; Dan Wallace; Elizabeth Kreiselmaier; Craig Keller; Tamara Flaherty; Timothy Tow; Colleen Wise; Arthur Coday; Sandi Peterson	Nathan Deily; Miguel Duque; Nicholas Coelho; Larry Nicholas; Data Logan; Whitney Davis; Ciaran Dougherty; Steve Hansen; Larry Hovde; Will Leonard; Randy McGlenn; Anna Johnson	Jody Thorsen Grage; Cynthia J. Sellers; Margaret J. Elisabeth; Stonewall Bird; Scott Charles Thompson; Bruce Radtke; Charles Law; Richard A. Redick; Frank Lockwood; Noah Martin; Colin Bartlett; Daniel Bumbarger	Jane N. Cutter; Andrew T. Freeman; Emily Forschmiedt; Sean Connolly; Jacob Nasrallah; Gregory Plancich; Ryan Oliveira; Nicolas Boone; Mitchell Malloy; Mario Carbonell; Eric Buerk; Charles A Susat	Michele Ann Smith; Patricia Ann Scott; Sara Jane Gates; Keith Bryan Smith; Mary Juanita Martin; Edwin B. Fruit; Scott A. Breen; Barbara Anne Kline; Rashaad Ali; Robert Bruneau; Dean Denno; Leah Beth Finger

=== Results ===
By winning nearly 58% of the vote, Joe Biden's performance was the best showing for a presidential candidate of any party in Washington since Lyndon B. Johnson's landslide victory in 1964.

2020 United States presidential election in Washington
Party	Candidate	Votes	%	±%
Democratic	Joe Biden Kamala Harris	2,369,612	57.97%	+5.43%
Republican	Donald Trump Mike Pence	1,584,651	38.77%	+1.94%
Libertarian	Jo Jorgensen Spike Cohen	80,500	1.97%	−2.88%
Green	Howie Hawkins Angela Walker	18,289	0.45%	−1.31%
Socialism and Liberation	Gloria La Riva Sunil Freeman	4,840	0.12%	+0.01%
Socialist Workers	Alyson Kennedy Malcolm Jarrett	2,487	0.06%	−0.07%
Write-in		27,252	0.67%	−2.58%
Total votes		4,087,631	100.00%	N/A

==== By county ====
County	Joe Biden Democratic		Donald Trump Republican		Various candidates Other parties		Margin		Total
County	#	%	#	%	#	%	#	%	Total
Adams	1,814	30.95%	3,907	66.65%	141	2.41%	-2,093	-35.70%	5,862
Asotin	4,250	35.56%	7,319	61.24%	382	3.20%	-3,069	-25.68%	11,951
Benton	38,706	37.57%	60,365	58.59%	3,962	3.85%	-21,659	-21.02%	103,033
Chelan	19,349	44.68%	22,746	52.52%	1,211	2.80%	-3,397	-7.84%	43,306
Clallam	24,721	50.18%	23,062	46.81%	1,481	3.01%	1,659	3.37%	49,264
Clark	140,324	50.95%	126,303	45.86%	8,776	3.19%	14,021	5.09%	275,403
Columbia	668	26.77%	1,754	70.30%	73	2.93%	-1,086	-43.53%	2,495
Cowlitz	23,938	39.71%	34,424	57.11%	1,918	3.18%	-10,486	-17.40%	60,280
Douglas	7,811	36.66%	12,955	60.80%	542	2.54%	-5,144	-24.14%	21,308
Ferry	1,486	34.03%	2,771	63.45%	110	2.52%	-1,285	-29.43%	4,367
Franklin	13,340	41.17%	18,039	55.67%	1,025	3.16%	-4,699	-14.50%	32,404
Garfield	366	24.58%	1,069	71.79%	54	3.63%	-703	-47.21%	1,489
Grant	11,819	31.37%	24,764	65.72%	1,097	2.91%	-12,945	-34.36%	37,680
Grays Harbor	17,354	45.14%	19,877	51.71%	1,210	3.15%	-2,523	-6.56%	38,441
Island	29,213	54.17%	22,746	42.18%	1,966	3.65%	6,467	11.99%	53,925
Jefferson	17,204	69.39%	6,931	27.96%	657	2.65%	10,273	41.44%	24,792
King	907,310	74.95%	269,167	22.24%	34,030	2.81%	638,143	52.72%	1,210,507
Kitsap	90,277	56.90%	61,563	38.80%	6,832	4.31%	28,714	18.10%	158,672
Kittitas	11,421	43.32%	14,105	53.50%	838	3.18%	-2,684	-10.18%	26,364
Klickitat	5,959	43.95%	7,237	53.37%	364	2.68%	-1,278	-9.42%	13,560
Lewis	14,520	32.05%	29,391	64.87%	1,398	3.09%	-14,871	-32.82%	45,309
Lincoln	1,713	24.36%	5,150	73.23%	170	2.42%	-3,437	-48.87%	7,033
Mason	17,269	46.29%	18,710	50.16%	1,324	3.55%	-1,441	-3.86%	37,303
Okanogan	8,900	41.82%	11,840	55.63%	542	2.55%	-2,940	-13.81%	21,282
Pacific	6,794	48.31%	6,953	49.44%	317	2.25%	-159	-1.13%	14,064
Pend Oreille	2,593	30.32%	5,728	66.97%	232	2.71%	-3,135	-36.65%	8,553
Pierce	249,506	53.76%	197,730	42.61%	16,845	3.63%	51,776	11.16%	464,081
San Juan	9,725	73.69%	3,057	23.16%	415	3.14%	6,668	50.53%	13,197
Skagit	38,252	52.10%	32,762	44.62%	2,409	3.28%	5,490	7.48%	73,423
Skamania	3,192	43.65%	3,885	53.13%	235	3.21%	-693	-9.48%	7,312
Snohomish	256,728	58.51%	166,428	37.93%	15,640	3.56%	90,300	20.58%	438,796
Spokane	135,765	45.96%	148,576	50.29%	11,089	3.75%	-12,811	-4.34%	295,430
Stevens	7,839	27.57%	19,808	69.67%	783	2.75%	-11,969	-42.10%	28,430
Thurston	96,608	57.46%	65,277	38.82%	6,249	3.72%	31,331	18.63%	168,134
Wahkiakum	1,165	39.08%	1,741	58.40%	75	2.52%	-576	-19.32%	2,981
Walla Walla	13,690	43.79%	16,400	52.46%	1,171	3.75%	-2,710	-8.67%	31,261
Whatcom	83,660	60.35%	50,489	36.42%	4,471	3.23%	33,171	23.93%	138,620
Whitman	11,184	52.94%	9,067	42.92%	875	4.14%	2,117	10.02%	21,126
Yakima	43,179	44.89%	50,555	52.56%	2,459	2.56%	-7,376	-7.67%	96,193
Totals	2,369,612	57.97%	1,584,651	38.77%	133,368	3.26%	784,961	19.20%	4,087,631

Counties that flipped from Republican to Democratic

- Clallam (largest city: Port Angeles)

==== By congressional district ====
Biden won seven of ten congressional districts.

District	Trump	Biden	Representative
1st	38%	59%	Suzan DelBene
2nd	35%	62%	Rick Larsen
3rd	50%	47%	Jaime Herrera Beutler
4th	58%	39%	Dan Newhouse
5th	53%	44%	Cathy McMorris Rodgers
6th	39%	57%	Derek Kilmer
7th	12%	85%	Pramila Jayapal
8th	45%	52%	Kim Schrier
9th	24%	73%	Adam Smith
10th	40%	56%	Denny Heck
10th	40%	56%	Marilyn Strickland

== See also ==
- United States presidential elections in Washington (state)
- Presidency of Joe Biden
- 2020 United States presidential election
- 2020 Democratic Party presidential primaries
- 2020 Republican Party presidential primaries
- 2020 United States elections
