= Eleanor Lee (disambiguation) =

Eleanor Lee (born 1999) is a Singaporean actress and singer.

Eleanor Lee may also refer to:

- Eleanor Lee (politician) (1931–2025), American politician
- Eleanor Agnes Lee (1841–1873), American diarist and poet
- Eleanor Percy Lee (1819–1849), American writer
