= 1986 United States Senate election in Washington =

- November 3, 1986
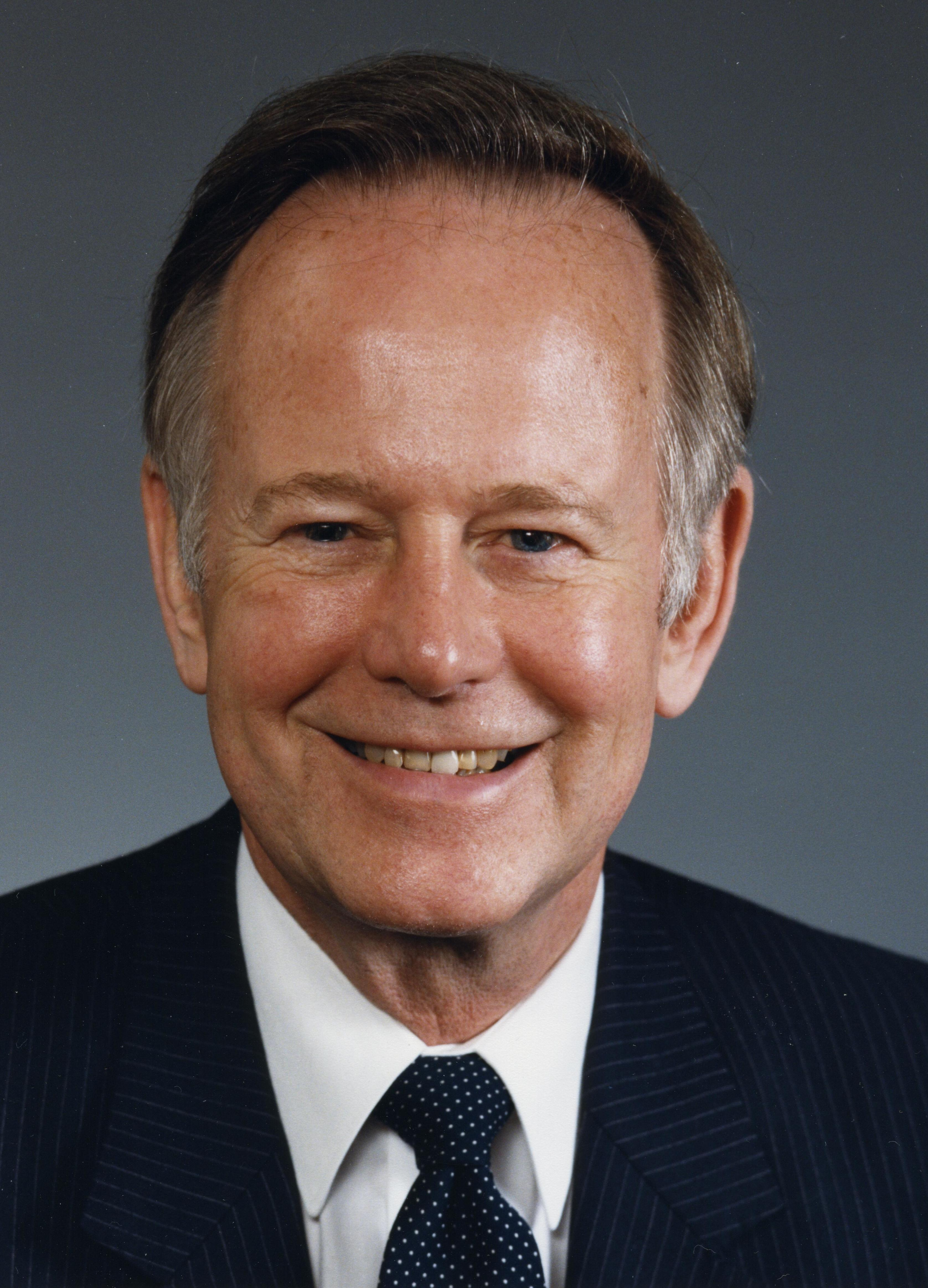

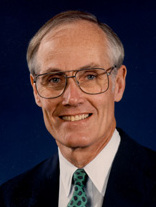
Nominee	Brock Adams	Slade Gorton
Party	Democratic	Republican
Popular vote	677,471	650,931
Percentage	50.66%	48.67%
- County results Adams: 40–50% 50–60% 60–70% 70–80% Gorton: 40–50% 50–60% 60–70%
U.S. senator before election
Slade Gorton
Republican
Elected U.S. Senator
Brock Adams
Democratic

The 1986 United States Senate election in Washington was held on November 3, 1986. Incumbent Republican Senator Slade Gorton lost re-election to former Transportation Secretary Brock Adams. Gorton later won Washington's other Senate seat in 1988 and 1994 before losing re-election again in 2000. To date, this remains the last time anyone other than Patty Murray won this senate seat.

== Blanket primary ==
=== Candidates ===
==== Democratic ====
- Brock Adams, former U.S. Secretary of Transportation
- Orin O. Osborn
- James Sherwood Stokes

==== Republican ====
- Slade Gorton, incumbent U.S. Senator
- George Campbell
- Ted Parker Fix

==== Washington Taxpayer ====
- Jill Fein

=== Results ===
Blanket primary results
Party	Candidate	Votes	%
Republican	Slade Gorton (incumbent)	291,735	46.36%
Democratic	Brock Adams	287,258	45.64%
Socialist Workers	Jill Fein	2,240	0.36%
Republican	George Campbell	12,608	2.00%
Democratic	Orin O. Osborn	8,378	1.33%
Democratic	James Sherwood Stokes	7,134	1.13%
Republican	Ted Parker Fix	5,154	0.82%
Total votes		614,507	100.00%

== General election ==
=== Candidates ===
- Brock Adams (D), former U.S. Secretary of Transportation
- Slade Gorton (R), incumbent U.S. Senator

=== Results ===
1986 United States Senate election in Washington
Party	Candidate	Votes	%	±%
Democratic	Brock Adams	677,471	50.66%	+4.83%
Republican	Slade Gorton (incumbent)	650,931	48.67%	–5.50%
Socialist Workers	Jill Fein	8,965	0.67%	N/A
Total votes		1,337,367	100.00%	N/A
Democratic gain from Republican				

==== By county ====
County results
County	Slade Gorton Republican		Brock Adams Democratic		Jill Fein Socialist Workers		Margin		Total votes
County	#	%	#	%	#	%	#	%	Total votes
Adams	2,328	63.78%	1,303	35.70%	19	0.52%	-1,025	-28.08%	3,650
Asotin	3,105	47.84%	3,328	51.27%	58	0.89%	223	3.44%	6,491
Benton	23,098	66.19%	11,312	32.41%	488	1.40%	-11,786	-33.77%	34,898
Chelan	8,812	57.57%	6,338	41.41%	156	1.02%	-2,474	-16.16%	15,306
Clallam	8,835	50.12%	8,675	49.21%	117	0.66%	-160	-0.91%	17,627
Clark	24,280	45.59%	28,692	53.87%	291	0.55%	4,412	8.28%	53,263
Columbia	1,069	62.92%	627	36.90%	3	0.18%	-442	-26.02%	1,699
Cowlitz	8,465	40.90%	12,143	58.66%	91	0.44%	3,678	17.77%	20,699
Douglas	4,229	56.61%	3,205	42.90%	36	0.48%	-1,024	-13.71%	7,470
Ferry	799	45.61%	938	53.54%	15	0.86%	139	7.93%	1,752
Franklin	5,132	57.80%	3,649	41.10%	98	1.10%	-1,483	-16.70%	8,879
Garfield	773	58.34%	549	41.43%	3	0.23%	-224	-16.91%	1,325
Grant	8,991	59.31%	6,039	39.84%	130	0.86%	-2,952	-19.47%	15,160
Grays Harbor	7,243	35.67%	12,857	63.32%	205	1.01%	5,614	27.65%	20,305
Island	9,138	58.34%	6,390	40.79%	136	0.87%	-2,748	-17.54%	15,664
Jefferson	3,332	45.61%	3,924	53.72%	49	0.67%	592	8.10%	7,305
King	204,547	45.91%	238,720	53.58%	2,277	0.51%	34,173	7.67%	445,544
Kitsap	22,131	46.31%	25,277	52.89%	380	0.80%	3,146	6.58%	47,788
Kittitas	4,264	51.13%	4,041	48.46%	34	0.41%	-223	-2.67%	8,339
Klickitat	2,142	40.10%	3,148	58.94%	51	0.95%	1,006	18.84%	5,341
Lewis	10,445	55.18%	8,246	43.57%	237	1.25%	-2,199	-11.62%	18,928
Lincoln	2,478	58.66%	1,716	40.63%	30	0.71%	-762	-18.04%	4,224
Mason	5,582	45.23%	6,674	54.08%	86	0.70%	1,092	8.85%	12,342
Okanogan	5,074	49.62%	5,069	49.57%	82	0.80%	-5	-0.05%	10,225
Pacific	2,600	37.16%	4,329	61.87%	68	0.97%	1,729	24.71%	6,997
Pend Oreille	1,707	49.75%	1,710	49.84%	14	0.41%	3	0.09%	3,431
Pierce	59,470	47.04%	66,038	52.23%	917	0.73%	6,568	5.20%	126,425
San Juan	2,417	52.41%	2,157	46.77%	38	0.82%	-260	-5.64%	4,612
Skagit	13,134	50.88%	12,487	48.37%	192	0.74%	-647	-2.51%	25,813
Skamania	602	20.44%	2,312	78.51%	31	1.05%	1,710	58.06%	2,945
Snohomish	52,615	48.66%	54,837	50.71%	686	0.63%	2,222	2.05%	108,138
Spokane	55,354	51.21%	52,149	48.24%	597	0.55%	-3,205	-2.96%	108,100
Stevens	5,729	56.08%	4,409	43.16%	78	0.76%	-1,320	-12.92%	10,216
Thurston	23,113	48.70%	23,960	50.49%	383	0.81%	847	1.78%	47,456
Wahkiakum	574	37.94%	920	60.81%	19	1.26%	346	22.87%	1,513
Walla Walla	8,173	58.45%	5,729	40.97%	80	0.57%	-2,444	-17.48%	13,982
Whatcom	17,879	47.97%	19,123	51.31%	267	0.72%	1,244	3.34%	37,269
Whitman	6,117	55.05%	4,919	44.27%	75	0.68%	-1,198	-10.78%	11,111
Yakima	25,155	55.73%	19,532	43.27%	448	0.99%	-5,623	-12.46%	45,135
Totals	650,931	48.67%	677,471	50.66%	8,965	0.67%	26,540	1.98%	1,337,367

==== Counties that flipped from Republican to Democratic ====
- Asotin (Largest city: Clarkston)
- Clark (Largest city: Vancouver)
- Ferry (Largest city: Republic)
- King (Largest city: Seattle)
- Klickitat (Largest city: Goldendale)
- Mason (Largest city: Shelton)
- Pend Oreille (Largest city: Newport)
- Pierce (Largest city: Tacoma)
- Snohomish (Largest city: Everett)
- Thurston (Largest city: Lacey)
- Whatcom (Largest city: Bellingham)

== See also ==
- 1986 United States Senate elections
