= 2005 King County Executive election =

- November 8, 2005
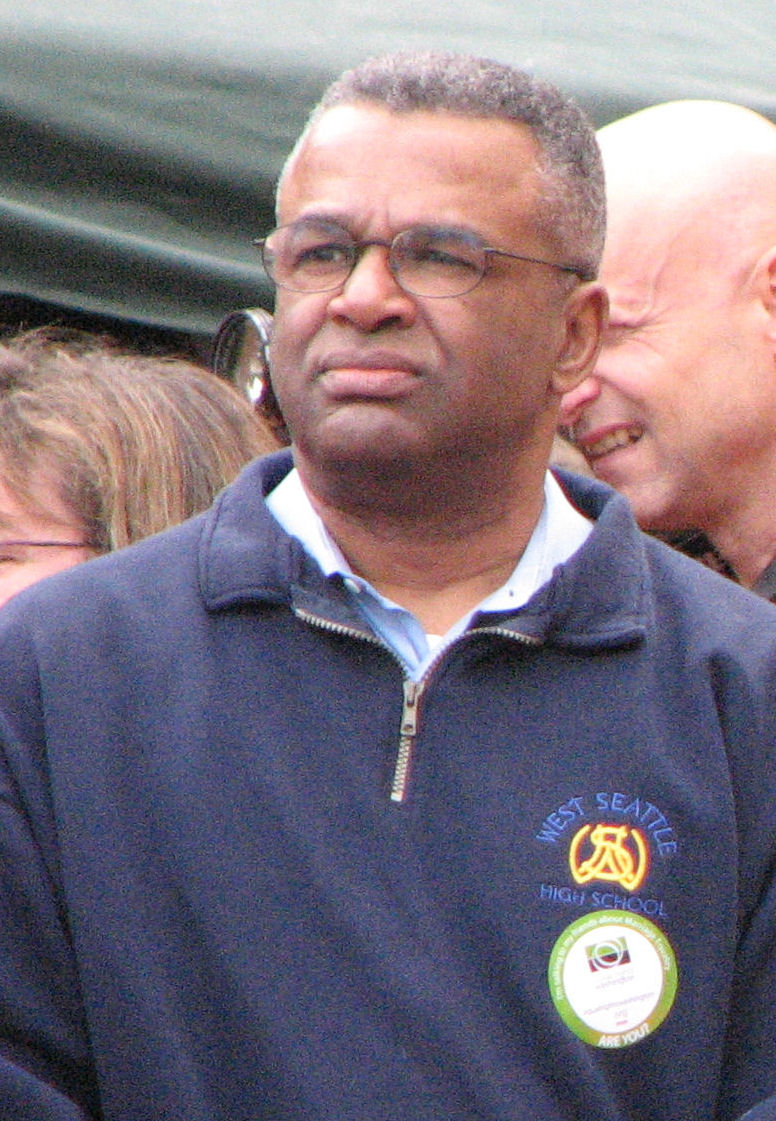

Nominee	Ron Sims	David Irons
Party	Democratic	Republican
Popular vote	293,777	209,021
Percentage	55.62%	39.57%
County Executive before election
Ron Sims
Democratic
Elected County Executive
Ron Sims
Democratic

The 2005 King County Executive election was held on November 8, 2005. The election, which was the first to take place after Washington's blanket primary was invalidated, used separate primaries. Incumbent Democratic County Executive Ron Sims, who unsuccessfully sought the Democratic nomination for Governor in 2004, ran for re-election to a third term. He was challenged by two lesser-known candidates in the Democratic primary, and won by a wide margin, but the race was closer than expected.

In the general election, Sims was challenged by County Councilman David Irons, the Republican nominee. Irons attacked Sims for his "lack of experience in knowing how to manage and lead," citing alleged mismanagement of the county elections office during the 2004 gubernatorial election. Though Sims's campaign acknowledged that seeking a third term was a challenge due to voter fatigue, and Irons was seen as a strong candidate, Sims defeated him in a landslide, winning 56 percent of the vote to Irons's 40 percent.

== Democratic primary ==
=== Candidates ===
- Ron Sims, incumbent County Executive
- Karen Rispoli, former prison guard
- Michael Nelson, perennial candidate

=== Polling ===
Poll source	Date(s) administered	Sample size (Note: Key: A – all adults RV – registered voters LV – likely voters V – unclear)	Margin of error	Michael Nelson	Karen Rispoli	Ron Sims	Undecided
SurveyUSA	August 30 – September 1, 2005	351 (LV)	± 5.2%	8%	17%	62%	13%

=== Primary results ===
Democratic primary results
Party	Candidate	Votes	%
Democratic	Ron Sims (inc.)	123,363	70.48%
Democratic	Karen Rispoli	34,816	19.89%
Democratic	Michael Nelson	15,969	9.12%
Democratic	Write-ins	886	0.51%
Total votes		175,034	100.00%

== Republican primary ==
=== Candidates ===
- David Irons, County Councilman

==== Declined ====
- Dino Rossi, former State Senator, 2004 Republican nominee for Governor (endorsed Irons)

=== Primary results ===
Republican primary results
Party	Candidate	Votes	%
Republican	Matt Drozd	97,158	99.44%
Republican	Write-ins	552	0.56%
Total votes		98,070	100.00%

== General election ==
=== Polling ===
Poll source	Date(s) administered	Sample size	Margin of error	Ron Sims (D)	David Irons (R)	Gentry Lange (G)	Other / Undecided
SurveyUSA	August 30 – September 1, 2005	1,642 (RV)	± 2.5%	49%	41%	–	10%
SurveyUSA	September 30 – October 2, 2005	467 (LV)	± 4.6%	50%	45%	–	6%
SurveyUSA	October 14–16, 2005	522 (LV)	± 4.4%	43%	46%	7%	4%
SurveyUSA	October 28–30, 2005	591 (LV)	± 4.1%	48%	41%	8%	3%

=== Results ===
2005 King County Executive election
Party	Candidate	Votes	%
Democratic	Ron Sims (inc.)	293,777	55.62%
Republican	David Irons	209,021	39.57%
Green	Gentry Lange	24,073	4.56%
Write-in		1,296	0.25%
Total votes		528,167	100.00%
Democratic hold			
