= 1994 United States Senate election in Washington =

- November 8, 1994
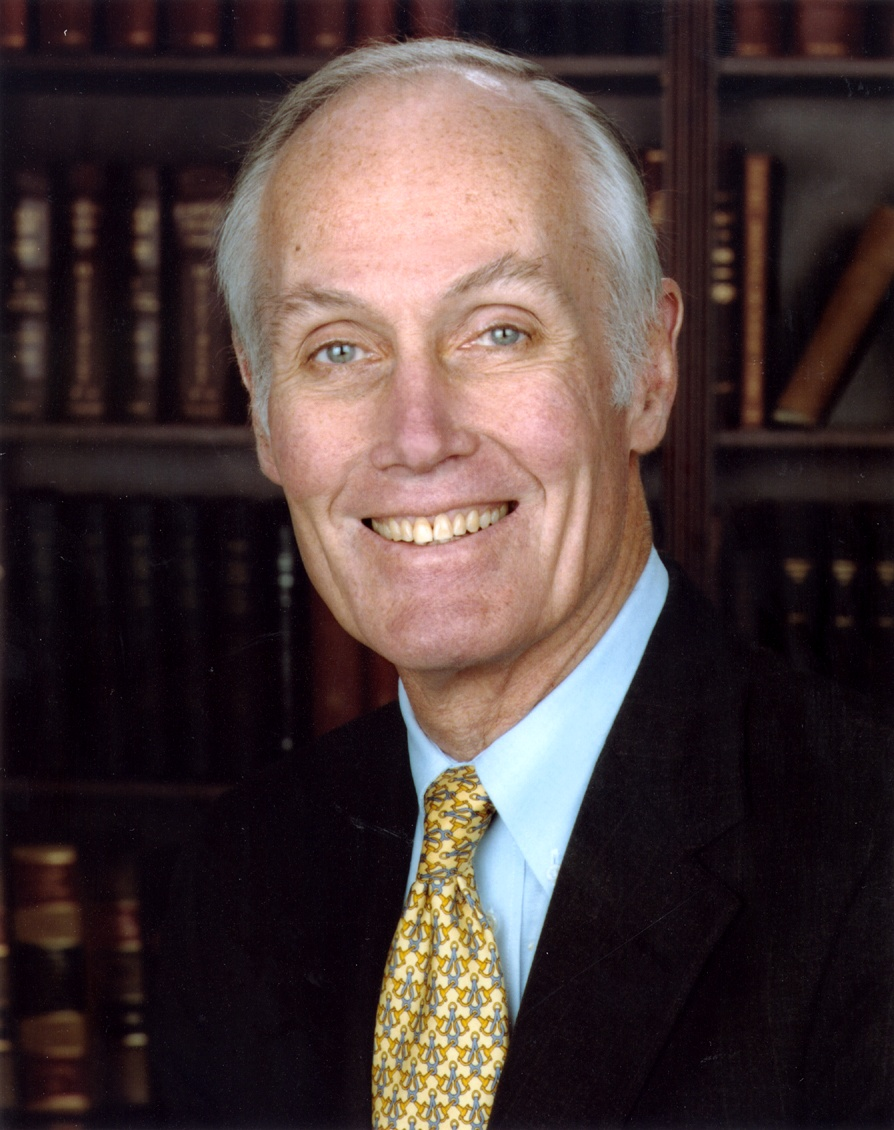

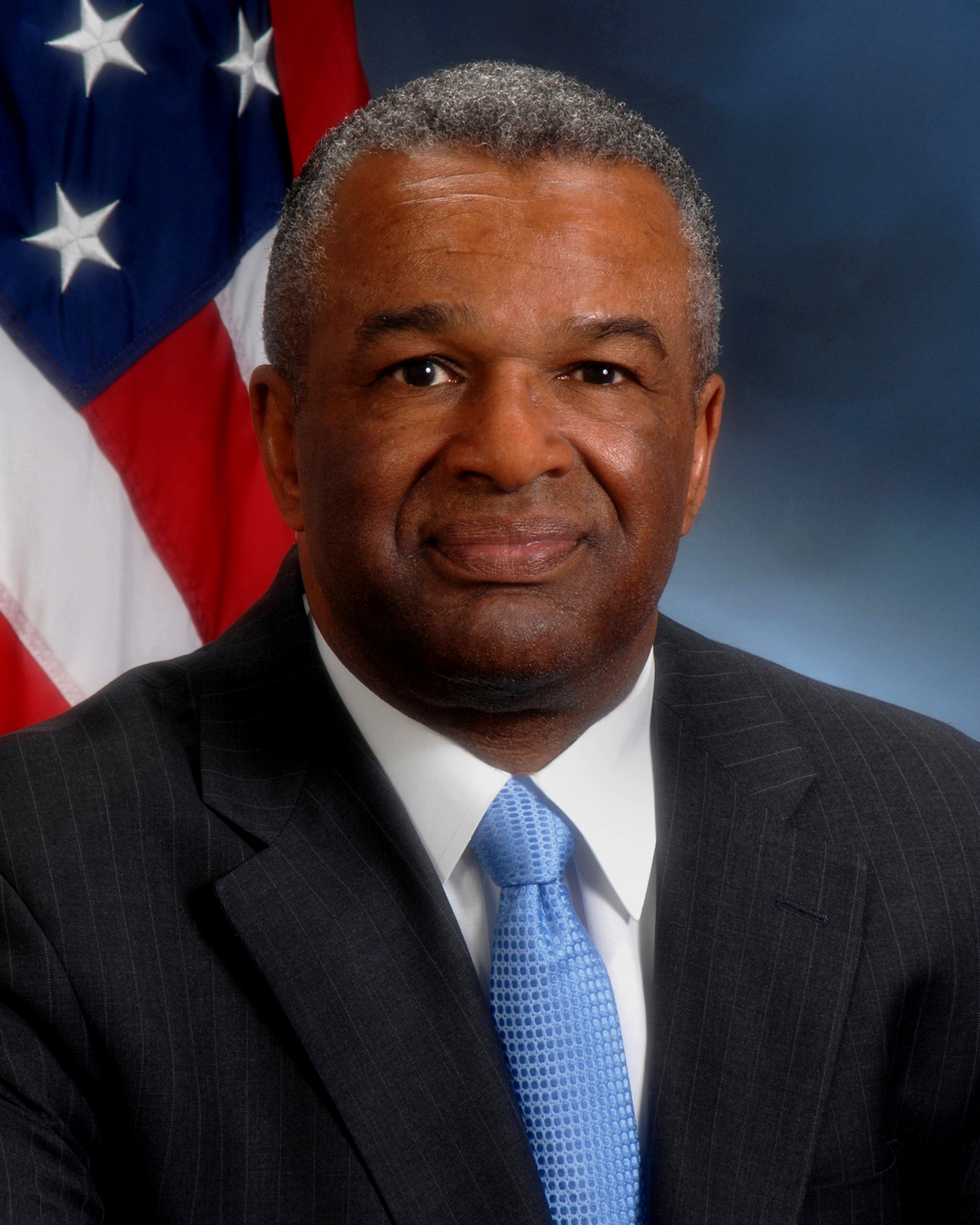
Nominee	Slade Gorton	Ron Sims
Party	Republican	Democratic
Popular vote	947,821	752,352
Percentage	55.75%	44.25%
- County results Gorton: 50–60% 60–70% 70–80% Sims: 50–60%
U.S. senator before election
Slade Gorton
Republican
Elected U.S. Senator
Slade Gorton
Republican

The 1994 United States Senate election in Washington was held on November 8, 1994. Incumbent Senator Slade Gorton won re-election to a second consecutive term. As of 2026, this was the last time a Republican, a man, or a non-Catholic won a U.S. Senate election in Washington.

== Background ==
Incumbent Slade Gorton was first elected U.S. senator from Washington in 1980. He narrowly lost his re-election bid in 1986. In 1988, he successfully ran for the state's other Senate seat.

Leading up to the 1994 U.S. Senate elections, Gorton was considered one of the most vulnerable Republican incumbents. Democrats had swept the statewide elections in 1992—winning the presidential, gubernatorial, and U.S. Senate races.

== Blanket primary ==
=== Democratic ===
Many prominent Washington Democrats declined to contest the seat. Campaign analyst Charlie Cook of The Cook Political Report wrote that "the real top-notch folks just aren't running." Seattle mayor Norm Rice was encouraged by President Bill Clinton to run, but opted to stay in his position as mayor. The Democratic Senatorial Campaign Committee unsuccessfully urged members of the state's U.S. House delegation to run.

Ron Sims, King county councilman, won the crowded Democratic primary with 17% of the vote. News anchor Mike James came in second with 15%; all other candidates received less than 5%.

==== Candidates ====
===== Declared =====
- Scott Hardman, businessman
- Mike James, news anchor
- Nominee: Ron Sims, member of King County Council
- Jesse Wineberry, member of the Washington House of Representatives

===== Declined =====
- Norm Dicks, member of United States House of Representatives
- Booth Gardner, former governor of Washington
- Norm Rice, mayor of Seattle

=== Republican ===
Incumbent Gorton faced no serious competition for the Republican nomination. He won the primary with 52% of the vote. No other Republican candidate received any significant amount of support.

==== Candidates ====
- Nominee: Slade Gorton, incumbent U.S. senator
- Warren E. Hanson, commercial fisherman
- Mike the Mover, perennial candidate

=== Results ===
Results by county Gorton: 40–50%; 50–60%; 60–70%; 70–80%

Blanket primary results
Party	Candidate	Votes	%
Republican	Slade Gorton (incumbent)	492,251	52.95%
Democratic	Ron Sims	162,382	17.47%
Democratic	Mike James	138,005	14.85%
Democratic	Scott Hardman	29,973	3.32%
Republican	Warren E. Hanson	26,628	2.86%
Democratic	Jesse Wineberry	24,698	2.66%
Total votes		873,937	100.00%

== General election ==
=== Candidates ===
- Slade Gorton, incumbent U.S. senator (Republican)
- Ron Sims, member of King County Council (Democratic)

=== Campaign ===
Despite serving 12 years in the U.S. Senate, Gorton campaigned in 1994 as an outsider candidate. He told crowds at campaign rallies: "If you want more of what you're getting from Washington, D.C., send one of my opponents. If you want a different direction, give a voice to balance by sending me back to the Senate." He gained support among agricultural, logging, and mining groups in Eastern Washington for his criticism of federal regulations. Gorton called for opening up more federal forests to logging and changes to the Endangered Species Act.

Sims campaigned in support of the Clinton administration. He accused Gorton of obstructing President Clinton's healthcare and crime reforms. The Sims campaign also attempted to portray Gorton as out of touch with the average Washingtonian. Sims was the first African American U.S. Senate candidate in state history to advance to the general election, although the issue of race was rarely addressed during the campaign.

=== Results ===
1994 United States Senate election in Washington
Party	Candidate	Votes	%	±%
Republican	Slade Gorton (incumbent)	947,821	55.75%	+4.66%
Democratic	Ron Sims	752,352	44.25%	−4.66%
Total votes		1,700,173	100.00%	N/A
Republican hold				

==== By county ====
County results
County	Slade Gorton Republican		Ron Sims Democratic		Margin		Total votes
County	#	%	#	%	#	%	Total votes
Adams	2,931	74.60%	998	25.40%	1,933	49.20%	3,929
Asotin	3,626	59.06%	2,514	40.94%	1,112	18.11%	6,140
Benton	32,430	75.15%	10,724	24.85%	21,706	50.30%	43,154
Chelan	13,286	69.78%	5,755	30.22%	7,531	39.55%	19,041
Clallam	13,879	57.53%	10,247	42.47%	3,632	15.05%	24,126
Clark	47,587	61.54%	29,737	38.46%	17,850	23.08%	77,324
Columbia	1,333	72.60%	503	27.40%	830	45.21%	1,836
Cowlitz	15,144	58.63%	10,686	41.37%	4,458	17.26%	25,830
Douglas	6,396	70.81%	2,636	29.19%	3,760	41.63%	9,032
Ferry	1,672	63.45%	963	36.55%	709	26.91%	2,635
Franklin	7,416	72.32%	2,838	27.68%	4,578	44.65%	10,254
Garfield	838	69.54%	367	30.46%	471	39.09%	1,205
Grant	12,722	70.58%	5,304	29.42%	7,418	41.15%	18,026
Grays Harbor	10,669	51.42%	10,080	48.58%	589	2.84%	20,749
Island	14,010	59.58%	9,505	40.42%	4,505	19.16%	23,515
Jefferson	5,308	47.74%	5,811	52.26%	-503	-4.52%	11,119
King	254,049	47.87%	276,710	52.13%	-22,661	-4.27%	530,759
Kitsap	38,007	56.89%	28,800	43.11%	9,207	13.78%	66,807
Kittitas	6,059	60.74%	3,917	39.26%	2,142	21.47%	9,976
Klickitat	3,598	62.63%	2,147	37.37%	1,451	25.26%	5,745
Lewis	15,634	68.36%	7,237	31.64%	8,397	36.71%	22,871
Lincoln	3,292	70.90%	1,351	29.10%	1,941	41.80%	4,643
Mason	8,228	51.72%	7,681	48.28%	547	3.44%	15,909
Okanogan	7,177	66.00%	3,697	34.00%	3,480	32.00%	10,874
Pacific	3,592	49.25%	3,702	50.75%	-110	-1.51%	7,294
Pend Oreille	2,688	62.51%	1,612	37.49%	1,076	25.02%	4,300
Pierce	93,399	55.49%	74,925	44.51%	18,474	10.98%	168,324
San Juan	2,918	46.33%	3,380	53.67%	-462	-7.34%	6,298
Skagit	19,003	56.30%	14,751	43.70%	4,252	12.60%	33,754
Skamania	1,781	57.47%	1,318	42.53%	463	14.94%	3,099
Snohomish	86,359	55.58%	69,031	44.42%	17,328	11.15%	155,390
Spokane	86,887	59.83%	58,334	40.17%	28,553	19.66%	145,221
Stevens	9,572	68.16%	4,472	31.84%	5,100	36.31%	14,044
Thurston	34,056	51.56%	31,998	48.44%	2,058	3.12%	66,054
Wahkiakum	958	57.23%	716	42.77%	242	14.46%	1,674
Walla Walla	11,218	66.05%	5,765	33.95%	5,453	32.11%	16,983
Whatcom	26,926	56.36%	20,852	43.64%	6,074	12.71%	47,778
Whitman	8,157	59.44%	5,567	40.56%	2,590	18.87%	13,724
Yakima	35,016	69.01%	15,721	30.99%	19,295	38.03%	50,737
Totals	947,821	55.75%	752,352	44.25%	195,469	11.50%	1,700,173

==== Counties that flipped from Democratic to Republican ====
- Asotin (largest city: Clarkston)
- Cowlitz (largest city: Longview)
- Ferry (largest city: Republic)
- Grays Harbor (largest city: Aberdeen)
- Mason (largest city: Shelton)
- Skamania (largest city: Carson)
- Thurston (largest city: Lacey)
- Wahkiakum (largest city: Puget Island)

== See also ==
- 1994 United States Senate elections
