= 2001 King County Executive election =

- November 6, 2001
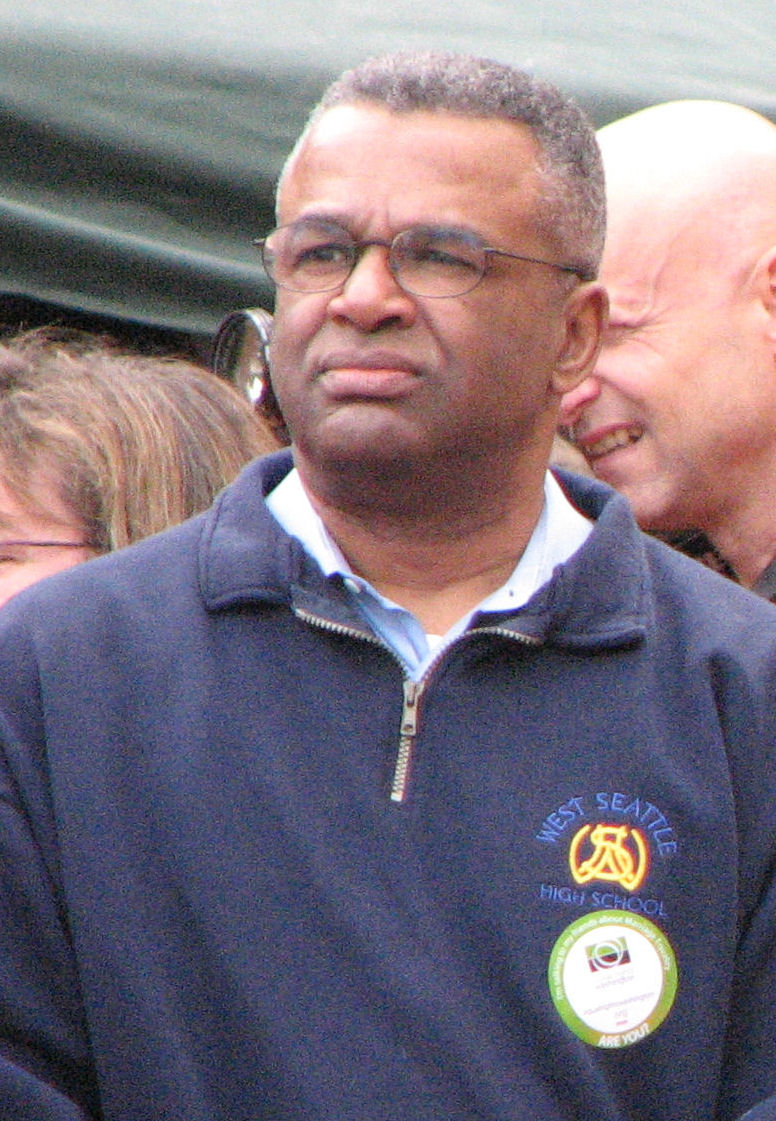

Nominee	Ron Sims	Santos Contreras
Party	Democratic	Republican
Popular vote	263,516	151,606
Percentage	60.79%	34.98%
County Executive before election
Ron Sims
Democratic
Elected County Executive
Ron Sims
Democratic

The 2001 King County Executive election was held on November 6, 2001. Incumbent Democratic County Executive Ron Sims ran for re-election to a second term. Though several prominent Republicans, including County Councilman Rob McKenna, considered running against Sims, he faced relatively little-known challengers. He was challenged by Kirkland City Councilman Santos Contreras, civil engineer Alan Lobdell. In the blanket primary, Sims received 59 percent of the vote. Contreras defeated Lobdell to win the Republican nomination, 26–12 percent, and advanced to the general election, along with Libertarian businessman David Fries. Sims ultimately won a second term in a landslide, receiving 61 percent of the vote to Contreras's 35 percent.

Following the invalidation of Washington's partisan blanket primary by the U.S. Court of Appeals for the Ninth Circuit, this was the last election for King County Executive to take place with the blanket primary.

== Primary election ==
=== Candidates ===
- Ron Sims, incumbent County Executive (Democratic)
- Santos Contreras, Kirkland City Councilmember (Republican)
- Alan Lobdell, civil engineer (Republican)
- David Fries, businessman (Libertarian)

=== Results ===
Blanket primary results
Party	Candidate	Votes	%
Democratic	Ron Sims (inc.)	165,533	59.32%
Republican	Santos Contreras	71,201	25.52%
Republican	Alan Lobdell	32,990	11.79%
Libertarian	David Fries	9,412	3.37%
Total votes		279,041	100.00%

== General election ==
=== Results ===
2001 King County Executive election
Party	Candidate	Votes	%
Democratic	Ron Sims (inc.)	263,516	60.79%
Republican	Santos Contreras	151,606	34.98%
Libertarian	David Fries	18,340	4.23%
Total votes		433,462	100.00%
Democratic hold			
