= Frank Connor (politician) =

American politician

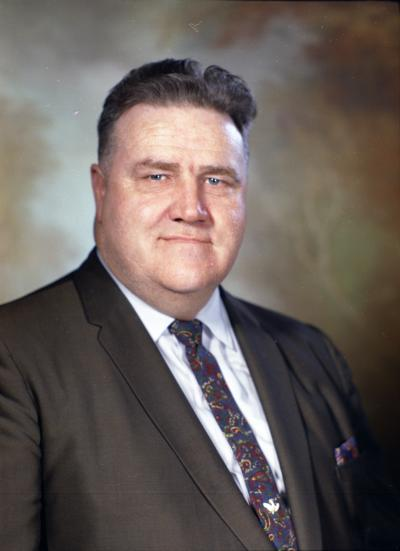
- Connor in 1967

Member of the Washington Senate from the 33rd district
- In office January 24, 1957 – January 13, 1975
- Preceded by: Albert Rosellini
- Succeeded by: John E. Cunningham

Member of the Washington House of Representatives from the 33rd district
- In office January 8, 1951 – January 24, 1957
- Preceded by: Cecil A. Gholson
- Succeeded by: Phil Gallagher

Personal details
- Born: September 30, 1916 Seattle, Washington, U.S.
- Died: April 1982 (aged 65) Seattle, Washington, U.S.
- Party: Democratic

Frank Connor (September 30, 1916 – April 9, 1982) was an American politician in the state of Washington. He served in the Washington State Senate and Washington House of Representatives
