= Slade Gorton =

American politician (1928–2020)

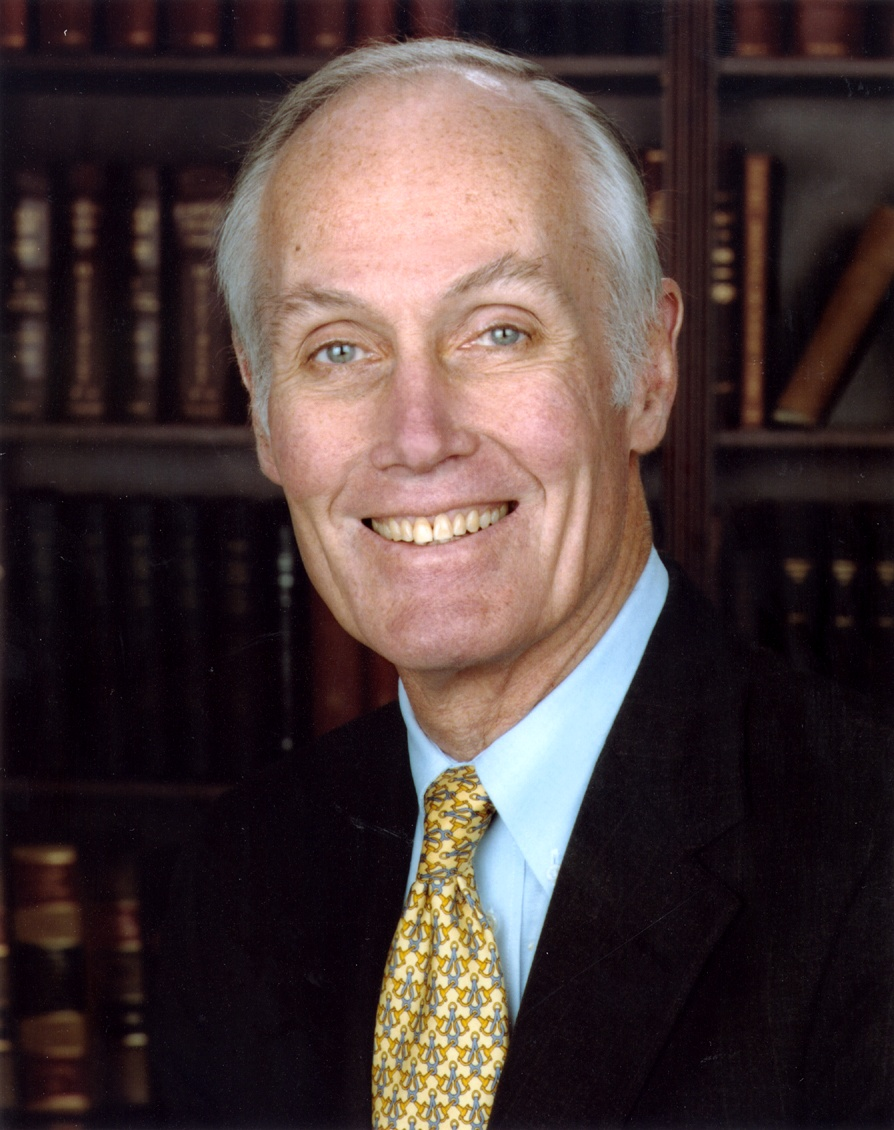
- Official portrait, c. 1990s

United States Senator from Washington
- In office January 3, 1989 – January 3, 2001
- Preceded by: Daniel J. Evans
- Succeeded by: Maria Cantwell
- In office January 3, 1981 – January 3, 1987
- Preceded by: Warren Magnuson
- Succeeded by: Brock Adams

14th Attorney General of Washington
- In office January 15, 1969 – January 1, 1981
- Governor: Daniel J. Evans; Dixy Lee Ray
- Preceded by: John O'Connell
- Succeeded by: Ken Eikenberry

Majority Leader of the Washington House of Representatives
- In office January 9, 1967 – January 13, 1969
- Preceded by: John L. O'Brien
- Succeeded by: Stewart Bledsoe

Member of the Washington House of Representatives from the 46th district
- In office January 12, 1959 – January 13, 1969
- Preceded by: Alfred E. Leland
- Succeeded by: George W. Scott

Personal details
- Born: Thomas Slade Gorton III; January 8, 1928 Chicago, Illinois, U.S.
- Died: August 19, 2020 (aged 92) Clyde Hill, Washington, U.S.
- Party: Republican
- Spouse: Sally Jean Clark (m. 1958; died 2013)
- Children: 3
- Relatives: Nathaniel M. Gorton (brother)
- Education: Dartmouth College (BA); Columbia University (JD)

Military service
- Branch/service: United States Army; United States Air Force
- Years of service: 1945–1946 (Army); 1953–1956 (Air Force); 1956–1980 (Reserve)
- Rank: Colonel
- Unit: United States Air Force Reserve

Thomas Slade Gorton III (January 8, 1928 – August 19, 2020) was an American lawyer and politician from Washington. A member of the Republican Party, he served as a member of the United States Senate from 1981 to 1987, and again from 1989 to 2001. He held both of the state's U.S. Senate seats in his career and was narrowly defeated for reelection twice, first in 1986 by Brock Adams and again in 2000 by Maria Cantwell following a recount.

== Early life and education ==
Gorton was born in Chicago, on January 8, 1928, and raised in the suburb of Evanston, Illinois, the son of Ruth (Israel) and Thomas Slade Gorton, Jr., descendant of one of the founders of the companies that would become Gorton's of Gloucester, and himself the founder that year of Slade Gorton & Co., another fish supplier. His younger brother is Judge Nathaniel M. Gorton of the United States District Court for the District of Massachusetts. He attended and graduated from Dartmouth College and subsequently from Columbia Law School. Gorton served in the United States Army from 1945 to 1946 and the United States Air Force from 1953 until 1956. He continued to serve in the Air Force Reserve Command until 1980 when he retired as a colonel.

== Early career ==
Gorton practiced law and entered politics in 1958, being elected to the Washington House of Representatives, in which he served from 1959 until 1969, becoming one of its highest-ranking members. He then served as Attorney General of Washington from 1969 until he entered the United States Senate in 1981. During his three terms as attorney general, Gorton was recognized for taking the unusual step of appearing personally to argue the state's positions before the Supreme Court of the United States, and for prevailing in those efforts.

In 1970, Attorney General Gorton sued Major League Baseball for a violation of anti-trust laws after the loss of the Seattle Pilots, who were moved to Milwaukee after the league declined a bid from local ownership group. He hired trial lawyer William Lee Dwyer to oversee the case and eventually withdrew following the league's approval of a second expansion team—the Seattle Mariners, who began play in 1977.

Years later, he approached Nintendo President Minoru Arakawa and Chairman Howard Lincoln in his search to find a buyer for the Mariners. Arakawa's father-in-law, Nintendo President Hiroshi Yamauchi, agreed to buy a majority stake in the team, preventing a potential move to Tampa. Gorton later helped broker a deal between King County officials and Mariners ownership on what is now called T-Mobile Park.

== U.S. Senate campaigns ==
Gorton with President Ronald Reagan at the White House

=== 1980 ===
In 1980, Gorton defeated longtime incumbent U.S. Senator and state legend Warren Magnuson by a 54% to 46% margin.

=== 1986 ===
Gorton was narrowly defeated by former U.S. Representative and United States Secretary of Transportation Brock Adams.

=== 1988 ===
Gorton ran for the state's other Senate seat, which was being vacated by political ally Daniel J. Evans, in 1988 and won, defeating liberal Congressman Mike Lowry by a narrow margin.

In the Senate, Gorton had a moderate-to-conservative voting record, and was criticized for what some perceived as strong hostility towards Native tribes. His reelection strategy centered on running up high vote totals in areas outside of left-leaning King County (home to Seattle).

=== 1994 ===
In 1994, Gorton repeated the process, defeating then-King County Councilman Ron Sims by 56% to 44%. He was an influential member of the United States Senate Committee on Armed Services as he was the only member of the committee during his tenure to have reached a senior command rank in the uniformed services (USAF).

Gorton campaigned in Oregon for Gordon H. Smith and his successful 1996 Senate run.

In 1999, Gorton was among ten Republican senators who voted against the charge of perjury during the Impeachment of Bill Clinton, although he voted for Clinton's conviction on the charge of obstruction of justice.

=== 2000 ===
In 2000, Democrat Maria Cantwell turned his "it's time for a change" strategy against him and won by 2,229 votes out of nearly 2.5 million cast.

Furthermore, Washington's Native tribes strongly opposed Gorton in 2000 because he consistently tried to weaken Native sovereignty while in the Senate.

Twice during his tenure in the Senate, Gorton sat at the Candy Desk.

== Later career ==
Slade Gorton was recruited to the "Project Review Committee" for Sound Transit to help steer the agency through political troubles in 2000–2001. He had been a strong supporter of the light rail effort during his time in the Senate.

In 2002, Gorton became a member of the 9/11 Commission, which issued its final report, the 9/11 Commission Report, in 2004.

In 2005, Gorton became the chairman of the center-right Constitutional Law PAC, a political action committee formed to help elect candidates to the Washington State Supreme Court and Court of Appeals.

Gorton was an advisory board member for the Partnership for a Secure America, a not-for-profit organization dedicated to recreating the bipartisan center in American national security and foreign policy. Gorton also served as a Senior Fellow at the Bipartisan Policy Center.

Gorton served on the board of trustees of the National Constitution Center in Philadelphia, which is a museum dedicated to the Constitution of the United States.

Gorton represented Seattle in a lawsuit against Clay Bennett to prevent the Seattle SuperSonics relocation basketball franchise, in accordance to a contract that would keep the team in Climate Pledge Arena until 2010. The city settled with Bennett, allowing him to move the team to Oklahoma City for $45 million with the possibility for another $30 million.

In 2010, the National Bureau of Asian Research founded the Slade Gorton International Policy Center. The Gorton Center is a policy research center, with three focus areas: policy research, fellowship and internship programs, and the Gorton History Program (archives). In 2013 the Gorton Center was the secretariat for the ‘Commission on The Theft of American Intellectual Property’, in which Gorton was a commissioner. Gorton was also a counselor at the National Bureau of Asian Research.

In 2012, Gorton was appointed to the board of directors of Clearwire, a wireless data services provider.

Gorton was a member of the board of the Discovery Institute, notable for its advocacy of the pseudoscience of intelligent design.

Gorton was also of counsel at K&L Gates LLP.

Gorton opposed the candidacy of Donald Trump for President of the United States in 2016, instead writing in Independent candidate Evan McMullin. He praised the first impeachment of Trump, urging other Republicans to join him.

== Personal life and death ==
He married the former Sally Jean Clark on June 28, 1958. They had three children, Sarah Nortz, Thomas Gorton, and Rebecca Dannaker, as well as seven grandchildren. Sally Gorton died on July 20, 2013, one day before her 81st birthday.

Gorton died after a brief illness with complications of Parkinson's disease on August 19, 2020 at the home of his daughter, Sarah Nortz in Clyde Hill, Washington, age 92.

Legal offices
Preceded by John O'Connell	Attorney General of Washington; 1969–1981	Succeeded by Ken Eikenberry
Party political offices
Preceded by Jack Metcalf	Republican nominee for U.S. Senator from Washington (Class 3); 1980, 1986	Succeeded by Rod Chandler
Preceded by Daniel J. Evans	Republican nominee for U.S. Senator from Washington (Class 1); 1988, 1994, 2000	Succeeded by Mike McGavick
U.S. Senate
Preceded by Warren Magnuson	U.S. Senator (Class 3) from Washington; 1981–1987; Served alongside: Henry M. Jackson, Daniel J. Evans	Succeeded by Brock Adams
Preceded by Daniel J. Evans	U.S. Senator (Class 1) from Washington; 1989–2001; Served alongside: Brock Adams, Patty Murray	Succeeded by Maria Cantwell
