= Brock Adams =

American lawyer and politician (1927–2004)

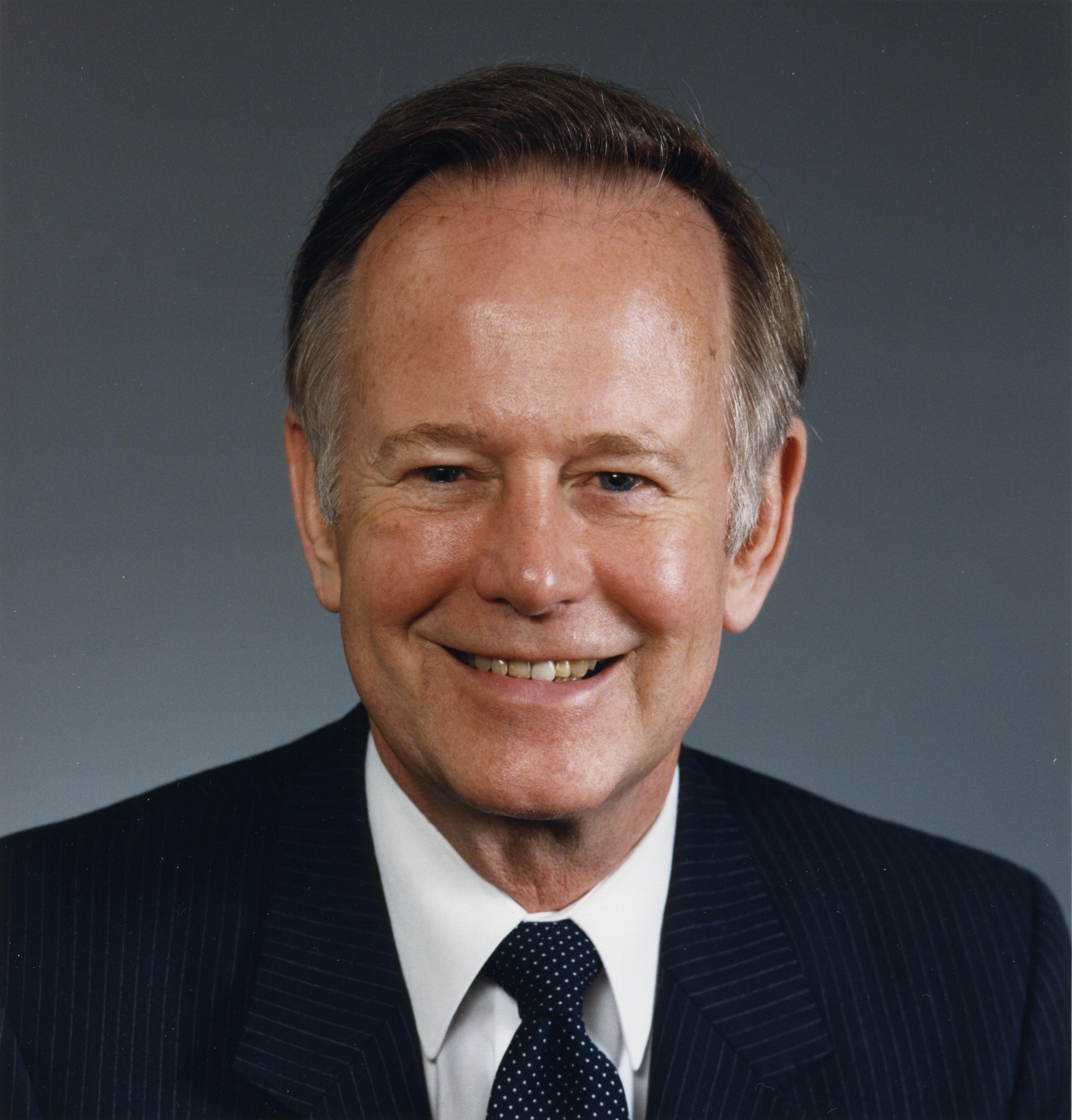

United States Senator from Washington
- In office January 3, 1987 – January 3, 1993
- Preceded by: Slade Gorton
- Succeeded by: Patty Murray

5th United States Secretary of Transportation
- In office January 23, 1977 – July 20, 1979
- President: Jimmy Carter
- Preceded by: William Thaddeus Coleman Jr.
- Succeeded by: Neil Goldschmidt

Chair of the House Budget Committee
- In office January 3, 1975 – January 3, 1977
- Preceded by: Al Ullman
- Succeeded by: Robert Giaimo

Member of the U.S. House of Representatives from Washington's 7th district
- In office January 3, 1965 – January 22, 1977
- Preceded by: K. William Stinson
- Succeeded by: Jack Cunningham

United States Attorney for the Western District of Washington
- In office 1961–1964
- President: John F. Kennedy; Lyndon B. Johnson
- Preceded by: Charles Moriarty
- Succeeded by: William Goodwin

Personal details
- Born: Brockman Adams; January 13, 1927 Atlanta, Georgia, U.S.
- Died: September 10, 2004 (aged 77) Stevensville, Maryland, U.S.
- Party: Democratic
- Spouse: Mary Adams
- Education: University of Washington, Seattle (BA); Harvard University (LLB)

Military service
- Allegiance: United States
- Branch/service: United States Navy
- Years of service: 1944–1946

Brockman Adams (January 13, 1927 – September 10, 2004) was an American lawyer and politician. A Democratic Party member from the state of Washington, Adams served as United States Attorney for the Western District of Washington for U.S. Presidents John F. Kennedy and Lyndon B. Johnson from 1961 to 1964, a member of the United States House of Representatives representing Washington's 7th congressional district from 1965 to 1977, the 5th United States Secretary of Transportation from 1977 to 1979, and a member of the United States Senate. He retired in January 1993 due to public and widespread sexual harassment, sexual assault and rape allegations.

== Early life and education ==
Adams was born in Atlanta, Georgia, and attended public schools in Portland, Oregon, and Seattle, graduating in 1944 from Broadway High School in Seattle. He attended the University of Washington where, in 1948, he was elected president of the student government (ASUW) and was the first student to both serve in that post and receive the President's Medal of Excellence as the university's top scholar. In 1949, Mary Maxwell served as secretary to ASUW president Adams. Later that year, Adams introduced Maxwell to his friend and her future husband, Bill Gates. He graduated in 1949 and was admitted to Harvard Law School, where he earned his Juris Doctor in 1952.

Adams was also a member of Phi Beta Kappa society.

=== Naval and legal career ===
Adams served in the United States Navy from 1944 to 1946, and was admitted to the Washington state bar in 1952, opening a private practice in Seattle. He was a member of the American Bar Association.

Adams taught law at the American Bankers Association from 1954 to 1960, and served as United States Attorney for the Western District of Washington from 1961 to 1964.

== Political career ==
=== U.S. House of Representatives ===
Adams was elected as a Democrat to the U.S. House of Representatives and served six terms beginning January 3, 1965. He was the chair of the newly created United States House Committee on the Budget during the 94th United States Congress, and was considered a strong candidate for Speaker of the United States House of Representatives.

=== Secretary of Transportation ===
On January 22, 1977, Adams resigned to become the fifth Secretary of Transportation following his appointment by President Jimmy Carter and confirmation by the United States Senate.

Adams's willingness to plunge into controversial issues during his time as Transportation Secretary was evident in the contrasting assessments of his tenure and accomplishments during a tumultuous period in transportation. The Wall Street Journal in 1979 called him the "biggest disappointment" in the Carter cabinet, while Public Citizen President Joan Claybrook, who led the National Highway Traffic Safety Administration under Adams, called him "absolutely one of the best transportation secretaries we've ever had".

After resigning his Cabinet post on July 20, 1979, Adams resumed law practice, this time in Washington, D.C., where he was a lobbyist for CSX Corporation and other railroad carriers.

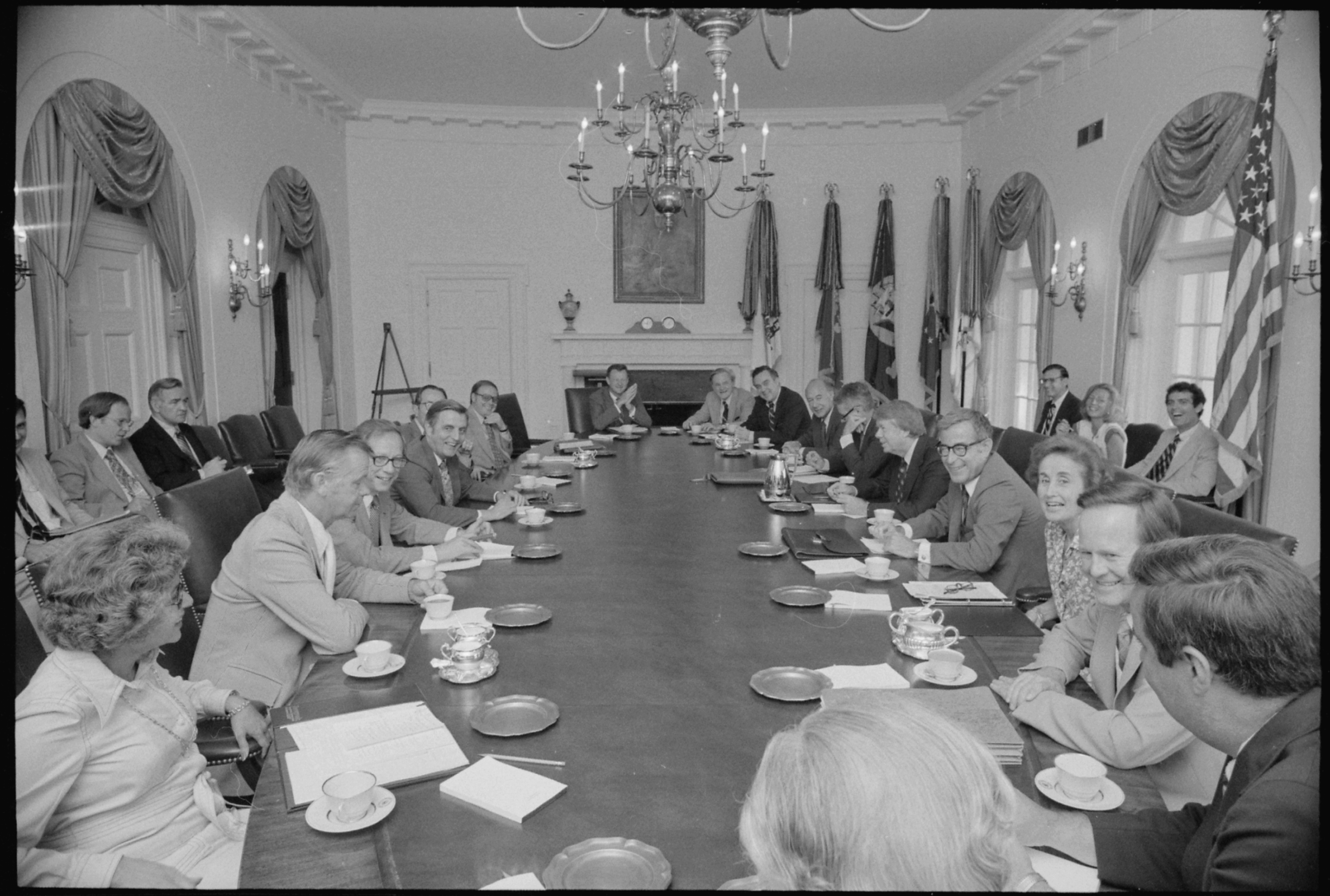
Adams at Cabinet meeting

=== U.S. Senator ===
Adams was elected to the U.S. Senate in 1986, narrowly defeating incumbent Republican Slade Gorton with 50.66% of the vote. Serving one term, he compiled a liberal record and was strongly supportive of his party's leadership.

=== Sexual assault, rape allegations ===
Kari Tupper, the daughter of a longtime friend, accused Adams of drugging and assaulting her in 1987.

In 1992 eight women made statements to The Seattle Times alleging that Adams had committed various acts of sexual misconduct, including sexual assault, sexual abuse and rape. Multiple women said they were drugged after being served suspicious drinks and either assaulted or raped.

In the exposé, an unnamed source said, "Adams had long been known by his staff and associates for aggressively kissing and handling women within his reach."

A former Democratic Party activist alleged that in the early 1970s, when Adams was serving in the House of Representatives, he invited her to a Seattle bar, where he drugged her with what he called "Vitamin C", after she recalled suffering from a cold. The woman said Adams followed her home, pushed her onto a couch and raped her.

A young woman in her thirties told Washingtonian that while she was seated to Adams's right at a formal luncheon shortly after she had taken a new job on Capitol Hill, he slid his hand under her skirt to the upper part of her thigh, whereupon she tried to move her leg away from him. Failing that, she said she tried to remove his hand, but Adams dug his fingers into her skin.

=== Forced retirement ===
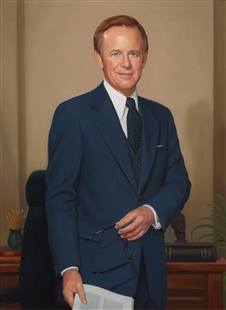
Portrait of Brock Adams

Adams denied the allegations in a press conference. But already under the spotlight due to previously aired allegations that he drugged and molested a young female aide in 1987, a highly publicized matter in which no charges were brought, Adams dropped out of his reelection campaign.

== Death ==
In retirement, Adams lived in Stevensville, Maryland. He died of complications from Parkinson's disease there on September 10, 2004, at age 77.

== Legacy ==
In light of the 2017 #MeToo Movement, some see Adams's legacy as a powerful politician who systematically abused his power over young women as emblematic of the culture of harassment in the government.

In 2020, an extensive PBS exposé concerning the workplace for women in the 1990s in Washington, D.C., described the climate of "sexual harassment and sexual entitlement [that] existed in some offices in the United States Senate", driven by some male senators whose behavior was well known on Capitol Hill. There was a list of senators and representatives whom young women were told to keep away from, which included Adams, John Conyers, Ted Kennedy, Bob Packwood, Mel Reynolds, Gus Savage, and Strom Thurmond.

== See also ==
- List of federal political sex scandals in the United States
- Lobbying in the United States

U.S. House of Representatives
Preceded by K. William Stinson	Member of the U.S. House of Representatives from Washington's 7th congressional district 1965–1977	Succeeded by John E. Cunningham
Preceded by Al Ullman	Chair of the House Budget Committee; 1975–1977	Succeeded by Robert Giaimo
Political offices
Preceded by William Thaddeus Coleman Jr.	United States Secretary of Transportation; 1977–1979	Succeeded by Neil Goldschmidt
Party political offices
Preceded by Warren Magnuson	Democratic nominee for U.S. Senator from Washington (Class 3); 1986	Succeeded by Patty Murray
U.S. Senate
Preceded by Slade Gorton	U.S. Senator (Class 3) from Washington; 1987–1993; Served alongside: Daniel J. Evans, Slade Gorton	Succeeded by Patty Murray
