= 2000 United States Senate election in Washington =

- November 7, 2000
- Turnout: 75.46%
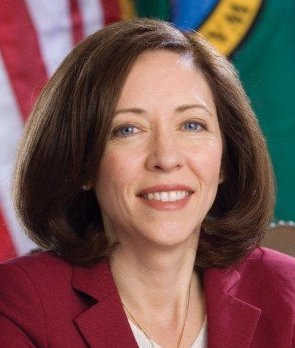

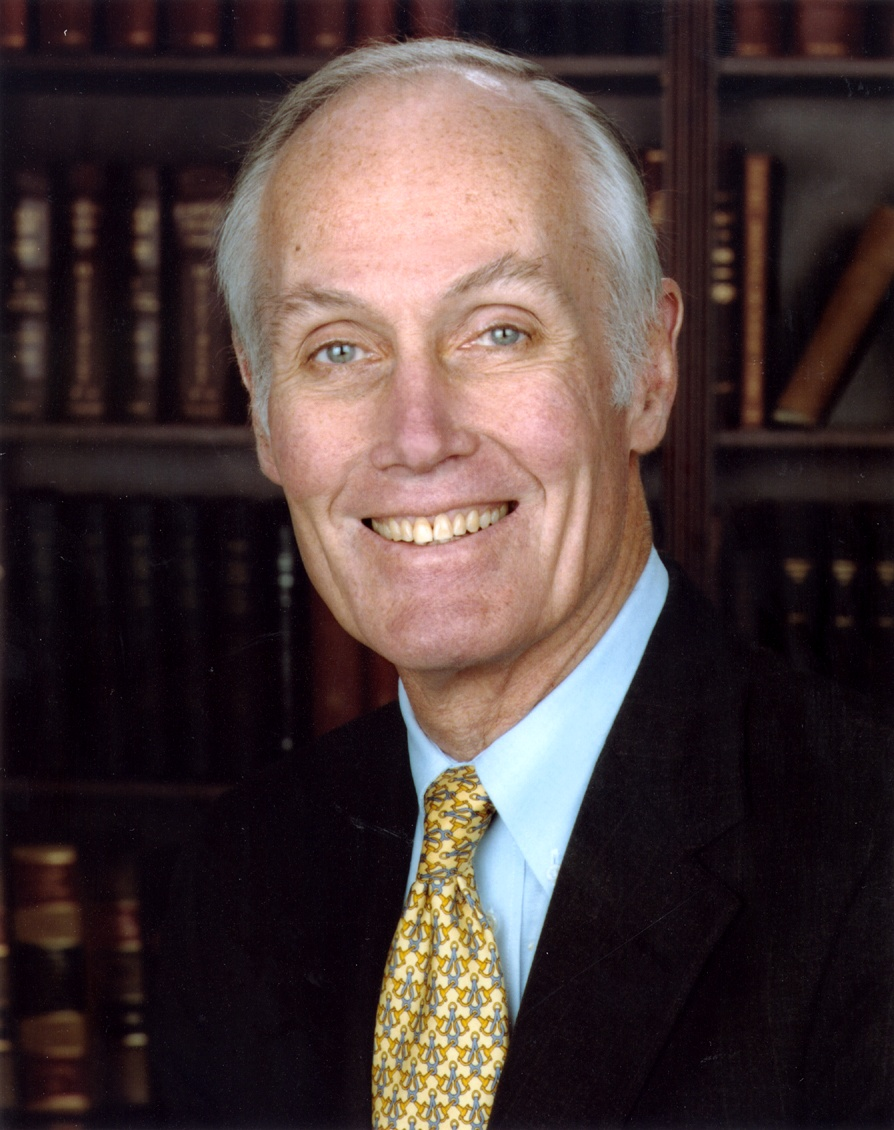
Nominee	Maria Cantwell	Slade Gorton
Party	Democratic	Republican
Popular vote	1,199,437	1,197,208
Percentage	48.73%	48.64%
- County results Cantwell: 40–50% 50–60% Gorton: 40–50% 50–60% 60–70% 70–80%
U.S. senator before election
Slade Gorton
Republican
Elected U.S. Senator
Maria Cantwell
Democratic

The 2000 United States Senate election in Washington was held on November 7, 2000. Republican incumbent Slade Gorton ran for re-election to a fourth (and third consecutive (Note: Gorton had previously served one term in the Senate from 1981 to 1987. He lost re-election in 1986 and was elected to the Senate again at this seat in 1988.)) term in office but was narrowly defeated by U.S. representative Maria Cantwell. The race was the most expensive contest in Washington state history at the time.

By a margin of 0.09 percent of the vote, this election was the closest race of the 2000 Senate elections. Cantwell's victory was credited to her strength in the Seattle suburbs. She spent almost $10 million (approximately $19 million in 2025 dollars) of her own money, which she had earned as an executive at RealNetworks.

As of 2026, this is the last time any U.S. senator from Washington lost re-election.

== Blanket primary ==
=== Candidates ===
==== Democratic ====
- Maria Cantwell, RealNetworks senior vice president and former U.S. representative from Seattle
- Deborah Senn, Washington insurance commissioner
- Barbara Lampet, retired nurse and perennial candidate
- Robert Tilden Medley

==== Republican ====
- Slade Gorton, incumbent U.S. senator since 1989
- Warren E. Hanson, commercial fisherman
- Ken McCandless
- June Riggs

==== Libertarian ====
- Jeff Jared, attorney

=== Campaign ===
The primary campaign pitted Cantwell and Deborah Senn against each other for the Democratic nomination. Cantwell was generally considered the more moderate of the two, and touted her private sector success in Seattle's booming technology industry. Senn was considered as a populist and campaigned as a staunch critic and opponent of the insurance industry.

=== Polling ===
Poll source	Date(s) administered	Sample size (Note: Key: A – all adults RV – registered voters LV – likely voters V – unclear)	Margin of error	Slade Gorton (R)	Maria Cantwell (D)	Deborah Senn (D)	Other/Undecided
Elway Poll	July 2000	400 (RV)	–	42%	21%	12%	25%

=== Results ===
Results by county: Gorton: 30–40%; 40–50%; 50–60%; 60–70%; Cantwell: 30–40%; 40–50%

Blanket primary results
Party	Candidate	Votes	%
Republican	Slade Gorton (incumbent)	560,787	43.57%
Democratic	Maria Cantwell	472,609	36.71%
Democratic	Deborah Senn	168,110	13.06%
Republican	Warren E. Hanson	17,782	1.38%
Libertarian	Jeff Jared	16,247	1.26%
Democratic	Barbara Lampert	15,150	1.18%
Democratic	Robert Tilden Medley	14,009	1.09%
Republican	Ken McCandless	12,089	0.94%
Republican	June Riggs	10,455	0.81%
Total votes		1,287,238	100.00%

== General election ==
=== Candidates ===
- Maria Cantwell, RealNetworks senior vice president and former U.S. representative from Seattle (Democratic)
- Slade Gorton, incumbent U.S. senator since 1989 (Republican)

=== Campaign ===
In the general election, Cantwell campaigned as a modern candidate with experience in high tech who understood the modern economy and accused Gorton of offering "19th-century solutions to 21st-century problems." Gorton criticized Cantwell for spending millions on her own campaign, arguing she was trying to buy her way into the Senate.

=== Debates ===
- Complete video of debate, October 30, 2000

=== Endorsements ===
Slade Gorton (R)

State senators

- Tim Sheldon, LD-35 (1997–2023) (Democratic)
Maria Cantwell (D)

Newspapers

- The Seattle Times

=== Polling ===
Poll source	Date(s)	Sample size	Margin of error	Slade Gorton (R)	Maria Cantwell (D)	Other / undecided (Note: Calculated by taking the difference of 100% and all other candidates combined.)
Rasmussen Reports	November 5, 2000	909	—	47%	43%	10%
Zogby Analytics	November 5, 2000	504	—	47%	52%	1%
Harris Insights & Analytics	November 3, 2000	6,542	—	49%	47%	4%
Zogby Analytics	November 2, 2000	500	—	47%	45%	8%
SurveyUSA	October 31 – November 1, 2000	500 (LV)	—	48%	46%	6%
Zogby Analytics	October 30, 2000	500	—	47%	46%	7%
Zogby Analytics	October 27, 2000	500	—	47%	45%	8%
EMC Research (D) (Note: Poll conducted for an unspecified Democratic sponsor.)	October 21, 2000	500	—	46%	42%	12%
Elway Research	October 18–20, 2000	400 (RV)	–	46%	45%	7%

=== Results ===
The victor of the race was at first unclear due to the amount of absentee ballots; the certified count on November 22 reported that Cantwell was ahead by 1,953 votes. Following the recount, Cantwell was certified the winner of the election by 2,229 votes out of more than 2.4 million. Cantwell carried only five of the state's 39 counties, but won King County (home to Seattle) by more than a 150,000-vote margin. The result was the second loss in Gorton's political career, after he lost re-election to a second Senate term in 1986.

Approximately 26,000 ballots were rejected during the recount for various issues.

2000 United States Senate election in Washington
Party	Candidate	Votes	%	±%
Democratic	Maria Cantwell	1,199,437	48.73%	+4.48%
Republican	Slade Gorton (incumbent)	1,197,208	48.64%	−7.11%
Libertarian	Jeff Jared	64,734	2.63%	N/A
Total votes		2,461,379	100.00%	N/A
Democratic gain from Republican				

==== By county ====
County results
County	Slade Gorton Republican		Maria Cantwell Democratic		Jeff Jared Libertarian		Margin		Total votes
County	#	%	#	%	#	%	#	%	Total votes
Adams	3,542	71.74%	1,328	26.90%	67	1.36%	-2,214	-44.85%	4,937
Asotin	4,917	62.27%	2,789	35.32%	190	2.41%	-2,128	-26.95%	7,896
Benton	40,314	67.96%	17,858	30.10%	1,151	1.94%	-22,456	-37.85%	59,323
Chelan	17,958	68.47%	7,758	29.58%	513	1.96%	-10,200	-38.89%	26,229
Clallam	17,470	54.85%	13,202	41.45%	1,180	3.70%	-4,268	-13.40%	31,852
Clark	69,265	52.31%	58,971	44.53%	4,187	3.16%	-10,294	-7.77%	132,423
Columbia	1,590	75.86%	467	22.28%	39	1.86%	-1,123	-53.58%	2,096
Cowlitz	19,191	52.58%	16,271	44.58%	1,037	2.84%	-2,920	-8.00%	36,499
Douglas	8,554	71.33%	3,177	26.49%	261	2.18%	-5,377	-44.84%	11,992
Ferry	1,918	63.38%	996	32.91%	112	3.70%	-922	-30.47%	3,026
Franklin	9,190	66.24%	4,445	32.04%	239	1.72%	-4,745	-34.20%	13,874
Garfield	1,013	76.57%	284	21.47%	26	1.97%	-729	-55.10%	1,323
Grant	16,361	69.18%	6,768	28.62%	522	2.21%	-9,593	-40.56%	23,651
Grays Harbor	13,386	51.98%	11,449	44.46%	919	3.57%	-1,937	-7.52%	25,754
Island	17,249	52.75%	14,676	44.88%	777	2.38%	-2,573	-7.87%	32,702
Jefferson	6,647	42.28%	8,647	55.00%	428	2.72%	2,000	12.72%	15,722
King	306,251	39.11%	459,605	58.69%	17,200	2.20%	153,354	19.58%	783,056
Kitsap	49,786	48.54%	49,627	48.38%	3,159	3.08%	-159	-0.16%	102,572
Kittitas	8,104	57.78%	5,598	39.91%	324	2.31%	-2,506	-17.87%	14,026
Klickitat	4,511	56.56%	3,214	40.30%	251	3.15%	-1,297	-16.26%	7,976
Lewis	19,904	66.84%	8,843	29.70%	1,031	3.46%	-11,061	-37.14%	29,778
Lincoln	3,718	71.42%	1,379	26.49%	109	2.09%	-2,339	-44.93%	5,206
Mason	11,118	49.97%	10,268	46.15%	864	3.88%	-850	-3.82%	22,250
Okanogan	10,006	67.94%	4,253	28.88%	468	3.18%	-5,753	-39.06%	14,727
Pacific	4,674	49.89%	4,348	46.41%	346	3.69%	-326	-3.48%	9,368
Pend Oreille	3,226	59.41%	1,994	36.72%	210	3.87%	-1,232	-22.69%	5,430
Pierce	129,674	48.84%	127,644	48.08%	8,192	3.09%	-2,030	-0.76%	265,510
San Juan	3,362	40.46%	4,729	56.91%	219	2.64%	1,367	16.45%	8,310
Skagit	24,047	53.51%	19,628	43.68%	1,262	2.81%	-4,419	-9.83%	44,937
Skamania	2,132	52.41%	1,717	42.21%	219	5.38%	-415	-10.20%	4,068
Snohomish	119,339	47.85%	123,111	49.36%	6,940	2.78%	3,772	1.51%	249,390
Spokane	93,633	54.62%	73,565	42.91%	4,228	2.47%	-20,068	-11.71%	171,426
Stevens	11,489	64.14%	5,792	32.34%	630	3.52%	-5,697	-31.81%	17,911
Thurston	42,804	44.36%	50,436	52.26%	3,263	3.38%	7,632	7.91%	96,503
Wahkiakum	1,105	57.19%	762	39.44%	65	3.36%	-343	-17.75%	1,932
Walla Walla	13,528	63.83%	7,249	34.20%	416	1.96%	-6,279	-29.63%	21,193
Whatcom	36,144	50.66%	33,308	46.68%	1,896	2.66%	-2,836	-3.97%	71,348
Whitman	9,281	57.66%	6,516	40.48%	300	1.86%	-2,765	-17.18%	16,097
Yakima	40,807	59.08%	26,765	38.75%	1,494	2.16%	-14,042	-20.33%	69,066
Totals	1,197,208	48.64%	1,199,437	48.73%	64,734	2.63%	2,229	0.09%	2,461,379

==== Counties that flipped from Republican to Democratic ====
- Snohomish (largest city: Everett)
- Thurston (largest city: Lacey)

==== Counties that flipped from Democratic to Republican ====
- Pacific (largest city: Raymond)

== Aftermath ==
After her victory, Cantwell announced that there was only "One Washington"; she also said she would work to make sure the entire state benefited from the Puget Sound region's prosperity, and that each year she would visit each of the state's 39 counties, interpreted as a gesture to the counties which she had lost. Her victory meant that both of Washington's senators were female (the other being Patty Murray); it was at that time one of three states to hold the distinction, along with California and Maine. Cantwell also became the thirteenth woman to serve in the Senate at the same time.

Cantwell's election also meant that Democrats and Republicans would have a 50–50 tie in the Senate. At the time the race was called, the concurrent presidential election was still ongoing, it was still unclear whether Dick Cheney or Joe Lieberman would be Vice President and thus cast the tie-breaking vote. At the time, it was noted that if the Gore-Lieberman ticket were to be victorious, then Connecticut's Republican governor, John G. Rowland would appoint Senator Lieberman's replacement, thereby giving Republicans a majority in the chamber. If the Bush-Cheney ticket were elected and eventually won the outcome due to the Florida recount against court rule proceedings, with Cantwell the winner of her race, there would be a tie in the chamber.

In a January 2002 appearance on C-SPAN's Booknotes, Ralph Nader (the 2000 Green Party presidential nominee) stated that when he met with Democratic Senator Harry Reid after the election, Reid had credited his candidacy with aiding Cantwell's victory; Nader had received 103,000 votes in the state, and since the party didn't run a Senate candidate, his supporters backed Cantwell down the ballot.

== See also ==
- 2000 United States presidential election in Washington (state)
- 2000 United States Senate elections
