= Eric Rohrbach =

American politician

Member of the Washington State Senate from the 33rd district
- In office June 1977 – December 9, 1977
- Preceded by: John E. Cunningham
- Succeeded by: Eleanor Lee

Member of the Washington House of Representatives from the 33rd district
- In office December 9, 1977 – February 18, 1980
- Preceded by: Eleanor Lee
- Succeeded by: Russell Austin

Personal details
- Party: Republican

Eric J. Rohrbach is an American politician from Washington state. He was a Republican member of the Washington House of Representatives, representing the 33rd legislative district.

He was appointed to the Washington Senate in June 1977 to fill the seat of John E. Cunningham, following Cunningham's election to the United States Congress and resignation from the Washington Senate.

He was appointed to the Washington House of Representatives on December 9, 1977, to serve the unexpired term of Eleanor Lee after she was elected to the Washington Senate in November 1977.

He was elected in the November 1978 General Election.

He received 8,077 votes, or 50.29% of the total, against 7,985 (49.71%) received by Democratic candidate Lorraine Hine.

Rohrbach, who was then 27 and co-chair of the House Insurance Committee, resigned on February 18, 1980. Following Rohrbach's resignation, Russell A. Austin, Jr. was appointed on February 20, 1980, to serve the unexpired term.
