= Eleanor Lee (politician) =

American politician (1931–2025)

Member of the Washington Senate from the 33rd district
- In office 1977–1991
- Succeeded by: Adam Smith

Member of the Washington House of Representatives from the 33rd district
- In office 1975–1977
- Succeeded by: Eric J. Rohrbach

Personal details
- Born: July 17, 1931 Elgin, Illinois
- Died: 2025 (aged 93–94)
- Party: Republican
- Education: Washington State University; Evergreen State College

Eleanor Lee was an American Republican politician who served in the Washington State Legislature from 1975 until 1991.

== Early life and career ==
Lee was born in Elgin, Illinois, in 1931 and five years later her family moved to Spokane. She attended Washington State University and later graduated in 1973 from the Evergreen State College with a BA degree in political science.

== Political career ==
She first ran for election to the Washington House of Representatives in 1970, but was unsuccessful. In 1974, she ran again for the State House of Representatives and was elected as the member for the 33rd district. In November 1977, she was elected to the 33rd district of the Washington State Senate in a special election, serving as a state senator until 1991, when she was defeated by Democratic candidate Adam Smith in the 1990 election.

In 1984, Lee was the Republican candidate for Lieutenant Governor of Washington, but lost to incumbent Democrat John A. Cherberg.

== Personal life and death ==
She was married and had children.

In March 2025, an official Washington State Legislature memorial resolution by Senator Bateman confirmed that Lee had died.
