= 1988 United States Senate election in Washington =

- November 8, 1988
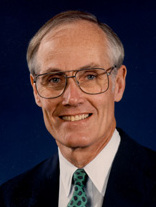

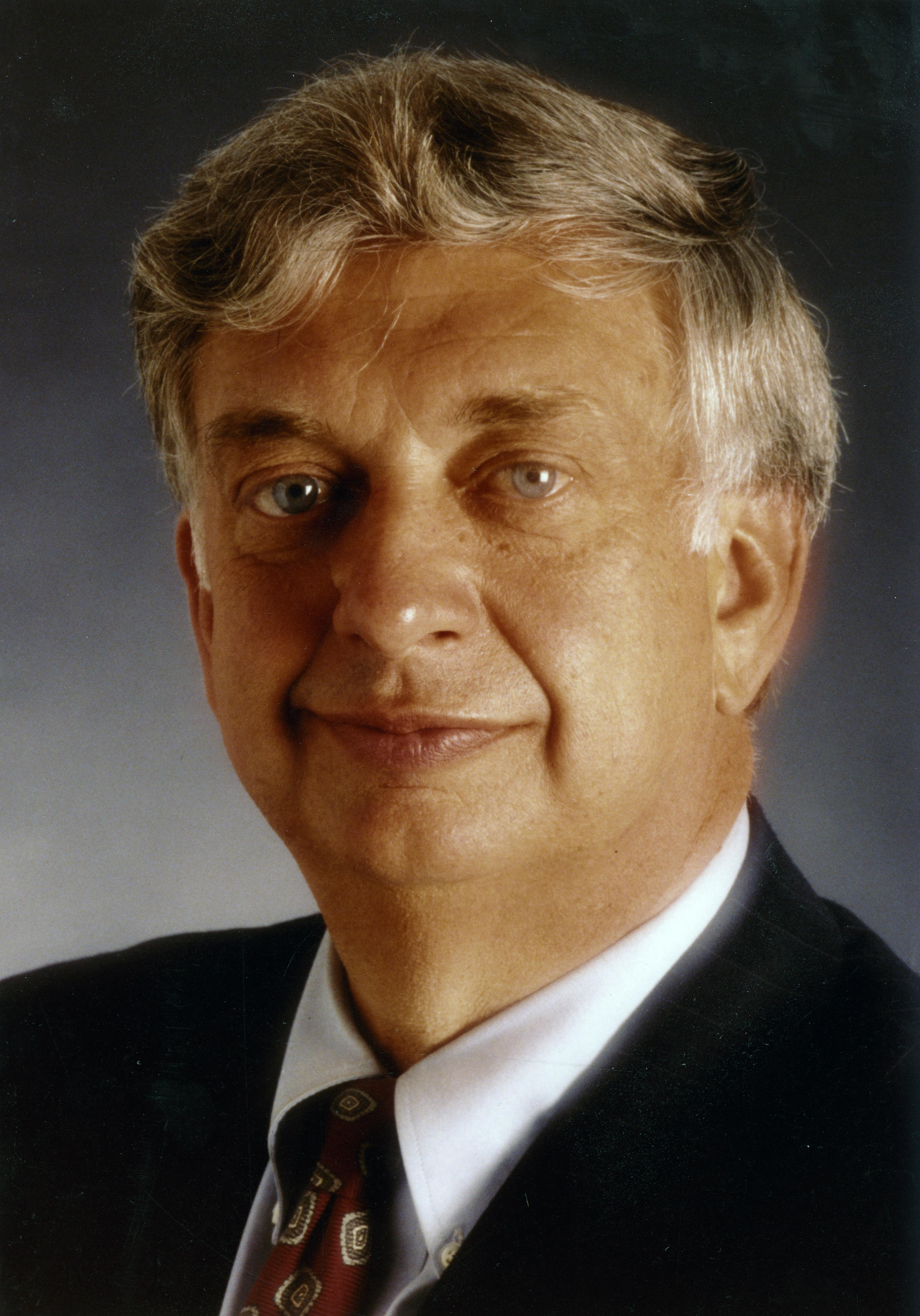
Nominee	Slade Gorton	Mike Lowry
Party	Republican	Democratic
Popular vote	944,359	904,183
Percentage	51.09%	48.91%
- County results Gorton: 50–60% 60–70% 70–80% 80–90% Lowry: 50–60%
U.S. senator before election
Daniel J. Evans
Republican
Elected U.S. Senator
Slade Gorton
Republican

The 1988 United States Senate election in Washington was held on November 8, 1988. Incumbent Republican U.S. Senator Daniel J. Evans decided to retire instead of running for re-election to a full term, after being appointed to the seat in 1983, and won election to a partial term that same year. Republican former U.S. Senator Slade Gorton, who had just lost a re-election bid in 1986, won the open seat. As of 2024, this is the last time Washington simultaneously voted for different parties for president and for Senate, as Democrat Michael Dukakis won the state in the concurrent presidential election.

Mike Lowry, the Democratic nominee, would run successfully for Governor of Washington in 1992. Before Sherrod Brown's victory in Ohio in 2026, this was the last time that an incumbent senator was previously defeated and then won another non-consecutive term to the senate.

== Blanket primary ==
=== Candidates ===
==== Democratic ====
- Mike Lowry, U.S. Representative from Renton (1979–1989)
- Don Bonker, U.S. Representative from Vancouver (1975–1989)

==== Republican ====
- Slade Gorton, former U.S. Senator (1981–1987)
- Douglas J. Smith

==== Third-party ====
- William C. Goodloe (Washington Taxpayer), judge and lawyer
- Daniel B. Fein (Socialist Workers Party)

=== Results ===
Results by county Gorton: 30–40%; 40–50%; 50–60%; 60–70%; Lowry: 30–40%; 40–50%; Bonker: 30–40%; 40–50%; 50–60%; 60–70%

Blanket primary results
Party	Candidate	Votes	%
Republican	Slade Gorton	335,846	35.90%
Democratic	Mike Lowry	297,399	31.79%
Democratic	Don Bonker	241,170	25.78%
Republican	Douglas J. Smith	31,512	3.37%
Washington Taxpayers	William C. Goodloe	26,224	2.80%
Socialist Workers	Daniel B. Fein	3,312	0.35%
Total votes		935,463	100.00%

== General election ==
=== Candidates ===
- Mike Lowry (D), U.S. Congressman of the 7th congressional district (1979–1989)
- Slade Gorton (R), former U.S. Senator (1981–1987)

=== Results ===
1988 United States Senate election in Washington
Party	Candidate	Votes	%	±%
Republican	Slade Gorton	944,359	51.09	−4.32
Democratic	Mike Lowry	904,183	48.91	+4.32
Total votes		1,848,542	100.00	N/A
Republican hold				

==== By county ====
County results
County	Slade Gorton Republican		Mike Lowry Democratic		Margin		Total votes
County	#	%	#	%	#	%	Total votes
Adams	2,856	64.01%	1,606	35.99%	1,250	28.01%	4,462
Asotin	3,195	48.64%	3,373	51.36%	-178	-2.71%	6,568
Benton	35,986	80.81%	8,547	19.19%	27,439	61.61%	44,533
Chelan	12,083	61.04%	7,711	38.96%	4,372	22.09%	19,794
Clallam	11,738	51.09%	11,235	48.91%	503	2.19%	22,973
Clark	40,518	51.98%	37,435	48.02%	3,083	3.95%	77,953
Columbia	1,170	59.88%	784	40.12%	386	19.75%	1,954
Cowlitz	13,502	47.45%	14,955	52.55%	-1,453	-5.11%	28,457
Douglas	5,718	60.78%	3,689	39.22%	2,029	21.57%	9,407
Ferry	981	49.42%	1,004	50.58%	-23	-1.16%	1,985
Franklin	7,683	70.43%	3,225	29.57%	4,458	40.87%	10,908
Garfield	719	54.43%	602	45.57%	117	8.86%	1,321
Grant	10,897	60.00%	7,265	40.00%	3,632	20.00%	18,162
Grays Harbor	9,780	40.43%	14,409	59.57%	-4,629	-19.14%	24,189
Island	12,806	59.62%	8,675	40.38%	4,131	19.23%	21,481
Jefferson	4,298	44.37%	5,388	55.63%	-1,090	-11.25%	9,686
King	289,087	46.00%	339,402	54.00%	-50,315	-8.01%	628,489
Kitsap	36,125	54.23%	30,493	45.77%	5,632	8.45%	66,618
Kittitas	5,542	52.37%	5,041	47.63%	501	4.73%	10,583
Klickitat	3,064	50.67%	2,983	49.33%	81	1.34%	6,047
Lewis	14,254	60.55%	9,287	39.45%	4,967	21.10%	23,541
Lincoln	2,805	59.21%	1,932	40.79%	873	18.43%	4,737
Mason	7,692	48.78%	8,078	51.22%	-386	-2.45%	15,770
Okanogan	6,189	52.01%	5,711	47.99%	478	4.02%	11,900
Pacific	3,325	40.49%	4,887	59.51%	-1,562	-19.02%	8,212
Pend Oreille	1,870	50.20%	1,855	49.80%	15	0.40%	3,725
Pierce	96,122	50.74%	93,310	49.26%	2,812	1.48%	189,432
San Juan	2,811	48.95%	2,932	51.05%	-121	-2.11%	5,743
Skagit	16,747	52.07%	15,416	47.93%	1,331	4.14%	32,163
Skamania	1,299	42.26%	1,775	57.74%	-476	-15.48%	3,074
Snohomish	88,307	52.34%	80,413	47.66%	7,894	4.68%	168,720
Spokane	73,583	51.80%	68,482	48.20%	5,101	3.59%	142,065
Stevens	6,729	55.53%	5,389	44.47%	1,340	11.06%	12,118
Thurston	33,371	49.34%	34,266	50.66%	-895	-1.32%	67,637
Wahkiakum	716	47.11%	804	52.89%	-88	-5.79%	1,520
Walla Walla	10,647	60.32%	7,004	39.68%	3,643	20.64%	17,651
Whatcom	25,278	50.50%	24,779	49.50%	499	1.00%	50,057
Whitman	8,022	52.51%	7,256	47.49%	766	5.01%	15,278
Yakima	36,844	61.79%	22,785	38.21%	14,059	23.58%	59,629
Totals	944,359	51.09%	904,183	48.91%	40,176	2.17%	1,848,542

==== Counties that flipped from Republican to Democratic ====
- Asotin (largest city: Clarkston)
- King (largest city: Seattle)
- Mason (largest city: Shelton)
- San Juan (largest city: Friday Harbor)
- Thurston (largest city: Lacey)

== See also ==
- 1988 United States presidential election in Washington (state)
- 1988 United States Senate elections
