= 2006 United States Senate elections =

- November 7, 2006
- Class 1

33 of the 100 seats in the United States Senate 51 seats needed for a majority

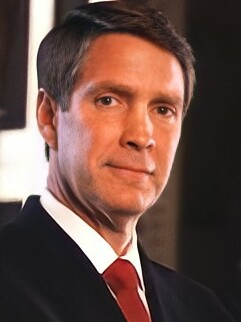
	Majority party	Minority party
Leader	Harry Reid	Bill Frist (retired)
Party	Democratic	Republican
Leader since	January 3, 2005	January 3, 2003
Leader's seat	Nevada	Tennessee
Seats before	44	55
Seats after	49	49
Seat change	▲5	▼6
Popular vote	32,344,708	25,437,934
Percentage	53.2%	41.8%
Seats up	17	15
Races won	22	9
	Third party	Fourth party
Party	CFL	Independent
Last election	0	1
Seats before	0	1 (Note: Jim Jeffords (VT) caucused with the Democrats.)
Seats after	1 (Note: Though Joe Lieberman (CT) won on the Connecticut for Lieberman ticket, he referred to himself as an independent Democrat and was listed on the Senate website as ID-CT.)	1 (Note: Bernie Sanders (VT) caucused with the Democrats.)
Seat change	▲1	Steady
Popular vote	564,095	378,142
Percentage	0.8%	0.6%
Seats up	0	1
Races won	1	1
- Results of the elections: Democratic gain Connecticut for Lieberman gain Democratic hold Republican hold Independent hold No election
Majority Leader before election
Bill Frist
Republican
Elected Majority Leader
Harry Reid
Democratic

The 2006 United States Senate elections were held on November 7, 2006, with all 33 Class 1 Senate seats being contested. The term of office for those elected in 2006 ran from January 3, 2007, to January 3, 2013. Before the election cycle, the Republican Party controlled 55 of the 100 Senate seats.

The Senate elections were part of the Democratic sweep during the 2006 elections, in which Democrats made numerous gains and no congressional or gubernatorial seat held by a Democrat was won by a Republican. However, Democratic incumbent Joe Lieberman in Connecticut was defeated in the primary and was later reelected as a third-party candidate; he continued to caucus with the Democrats. Because of this, this is the first time since 1970 in which a member of a third party, who is not an independent, was elected to the Senate. Independent Jim Jeffords in Vermont retired but was succeeded by another Independent, Bernie Sanders, retaining their presence in the Senate. Jeffords and Sanders both caucused with Democrats. Democrats picked 6 seats up by defeating Republican incumbents in Missouri, Montana, Pennsylvania, Ohio, Rhode Island, and Virginia, while holding open seats in Maryland and Minnesota. Republicans held their sole open seat in Tennessee. As of 2026, this is the most recent midterm in which none of the open seats flipped parties.

Following the elections, no party held a majority of seats for the first time since January 1955. The Democrats were able to control the chamber because the two Independents caucused with the Democrats. They needed at least 51 seats to control the Senate because Vice President Dick Cheney would have broken any 50–50 tie in favor of the Republicans. This was the only time between 1990 and 2022 that Democrats gained Senate seats in a midterm.

As of 2024, this was the last time a Democrat won a Senate election in Nebraska, the last time a Democrat did not win a seat in Connecticut, and the last time that the tipping point state was decided by under 1%, with Jim Webb of Virginia winning by a margin of under 0.4%.

== Results summary ==
↓
49	2	49

Democratic	Independent	Republican

Summary of the November 7, 2006, United States Senate election results

Parties										Total
Parties		Republican	Democratic	Independent	Libertarian	Green	Independence	Constitution	Others	Total
Before these elections		55	44	1 (Note: The Independents caucused with Democrats.)	—	—	—	—	—	100
Not Up	Total	40	27	—	—	—	—	—	—	67
Not Up	Class 2 (2002→2008)	21	12	0	—	—	—	—	—	33
Not Up	Class 3 (2004→2010)	19	15	0	—	—	—	—	—	34
Up	Class 1	15	17	1	—	—	—	—	—	33
Incumbent retired	Held by same party	1	2	1	—	—	—	—	—	4
Incumbent retired	Replaced by other party	—	—	—	—	—	—	—	—	0
Incumbent ran	Total before	14	15 (Note: In Connecticut, Joe Lieberman lost renomination for another term, Ned Lamont became the party's new nominee. Therefore, Lieberman ran as an Independent candidate.)	—	—	—	—	—	—	29
Incumbent ran	Won re-election	8	14	—	—	—	—	—	—	22
Incumbent ran	Lost re-election	▼6 Republicans replaced by ▲6 Democrats		—	—	—	—	—	—	6
Incumbent ran	Lost renomination, held by same party	—	—	—	—	—	—	—	—	0
Incumbent ran	Lost renomination, and party lost	—	▼1 Democrat re-elected as an ▲ Independent		—	—	—	—	—	1
Incumbent ran	Result after	8	20	1	—	—	—	—	—	29
Net gain/loss		▼6	▲5	▲1	—	—	—	—	—	6
Total elected		9	22	2	—	—	—	—	—	33
Result		49	49	2	—	—	—	—	—	100
Popular vote	Votes (turnout: 29.7 %)	25,437,934	32,344,708	378,142	612,732	295,935	231,899	26,934	1,115,432	60,839,144
Popular vote	Share	41.81%	53.16%	0.62%	1.01%	0.49%	0.38%	0.04%	1.83%	100%

Sources:

- Dave Leip's Atlas of U.S. Elections
- United States Elections Project at George Mason University

== Change in composition ==
=== Before the elections ===
Map of retirements: Republican incumbent Democratic incumbent Independent incumbent (Note: Joe Lieberman of Connecticut was a Democratic incumbent, but lost the Democratic nomination and subsequently ran for re-election as an independent under the Connecticut for Lieberman party.) Democratic incumbent retired Republican incumbent retired Independent incumbent retired

D_{1}	D_{2}	D_{3}	D_{4}	D_{5}	D_{6}	D_{7}	D_{8}	D_{9}	D_{10}
D_{20}	D_{19}	D_{18}	D_{17}	D_{16}	D_{15}	D_{14}	D_{13}	D_{12}	D_{11}
D_{21}	D_{22}	D_{23}	D_{24}	D_{25}	D_{26}	D_{27}	D_{28} Calif. Ran	D_{29} Conn. Ran	D_{30} Del. Ran
D_{40} Wash. Ran	D_{39} N.D. Ran	D_{38} N.Y. Ran	D_{37} N.M. Ran	D_{36} N.J. Ran	D_{35} Neb. Ran	D_{34} Mich. Ran	D_{33} Mass. Ran	D_{32} Hawaii; Ran	D_{31} Fla. Ran
D_{41} W.Va. Ran	D_{42} Wis. Ran	D_{43} Md. Retired	D_{44} Minn. Retired	I_{1} Vt. Retired	R_{55} Tenn. Retired	R_{54} Wyo. Ran	R_{53} Va. Ran	R_{52} Utah; Ran	R_{51} Texas; Ran
Majority →									R_{51} Texas; Ran
R_{41} Ariz. Ran	R_{42} Ind. Ran	R_{43} Maine; Ran	R_{44} Miss. Ran	R_{45} Mo. Ran	R_{46} Mont. Ran	R_{47} Nev. Ran	R_{48} Ohio; Ran	R_{49} Pa. Ran	R_{50} R.I. Ran
R_{40}	R_{39}	R_{38}	R_{37}	R_{36}	R_{35}	R_{34}	R_{33}	R_{32}	R_{31}
R_{21}	R_{22}	R_{23}	R_{24}	R_{25}	R_{26}	R_{27}	R_{28}	R_{29}	R_{30}
R_{20}	R_{19}	R_{18}	R_{17}	R_{16}	R_{15}	R_{14}	R_{13}	R_{12}	R_{11}
R_{1}	R_{2}	R_{3}	R_{4}	R_{5}	R_{6}	R_{7}	R_{8}	R_{9}	R_{10}

=== After the elections ===
D_{1}	D_{2}	D_{3}	D_{4}	D_{5}	D_{6}	D_{7}	D_{8}	D_{9}	D_{10}
D_{20}	D_{19}	D_{18}	D_{17}	D_{16}	D_{15}	D_{14}	D_{13}	D_{12}	D_{11}
D_{21}	D_{22}	D_{23}	D_{24}	D_{25}	D_{26}	D_{27}	D_{28} Calif. Re-elected	D_{29} Del. Re-elected	D_{30} Fla. Re-elected
D_{40} N.D. Re-elected	D_{39} N.Y. Re-elected	D_{38} N.M. Re-elected	D_{37} N.J. Elected (Note: Appointee elected)	D_{36} Neb. Re-elected	D_{35} Minn. Hold	D_{34} Mich. Re-elected	D_{33} Mass. Re-elected	D_{32} Md. Hold	D_{31} Hawaii; Re-elected
D_{41} Wash. Re-elected	D_{42} W.Va. Re-elected	D_{43} Wis. Re-elected	D_{44} Mo. Gain	D_{45} Mont. Gain	D_{46} Ohio; Gain	D_{47} Pa. Gain	D_{48} R.I. Gain	D_{49} Va. Gain	I_{1} Conn. Re-elected; New party
Majority (with Independents) ↑									I_{2} Vt. Hold
R_{41} Ariz. Re-elected	R_{42} Ind. Re-elected	R_{43} Maine; Re-elected	R_{44} Miss. Re-elected	R_{45} Nev. Re-elected	R_{46} Tenn. Hold	R_{47} Texas; Re-elected	R_{48} Utah; Re-elected	R_{49} Wyo. Re-elected	I_{2} Vt. Hold
R_{40}	R_{39}	R_{38}	R_{37}	R_{36}	R_{35}	R_{34}	R_{33}	R_{32}	R_{31}
R_{21}	R_{22}	R_{23}	R_{24}	R_{25}	R_{26}	R_{27}	R_{28}	R_{29}	R_{30}
R_{20}	R_{19}	R_{18}	R_{17}	R_{16}	R_{15}	R_{14}	R_{13}	R_{12}	R_{11}
R_{1}	R_{2}	R_{3}	R_{4}	R_{5}	R_{6}	R_{7}	R_{8}	R_{9}	R_{10}

Key:

D_{#}	Democratic
I_{#}	Independent
R_{#}	Republican

== Final pre-election predictions ==
State	Incumbent	Last election (Note: The last elections for this group of senators were in 2000, except for those elected in a special election or who were appointed after the resignation or passing of a sitting senator, as noted.)	Crystal Ball	Rothenberg	Cook	Result
Arizona	Jon Kyl	79.3% R	Lean R	Lean R	Lean R	Kyl; 53.3% R
California	Dianne Feinstein	55.8% D	Safe D	Safe D	Safe D	Feinstein; 59.4% D
Connecticut	Joe Lieberman (lost renomination)	63.2% D	Lean I (flip)	Safe I (flip)	Safe I (flip)	Lieberman; 49.7% I (flip)
Delaware	Tom Carper	55.5% D	Safe D	Safe D	Safe D	Carper; 67.1% D
Florida	Bill Nelson	51% D	Safe D	Safe D	Safe D	Nelson; 60.3% D
Hawaii	Daniel Akaka	72.7% D	Safe D	Safe D	Safe D	Akaka; 61.4% D
Indiana	Richard Lugar	66.5% R	Safe R	Safe R	Safe R	Lugar; 87.3% R
Maine	Olympia Snowe	68.9% R	Safe R	Safe R	Safe R	Snowe; 74.4% R
Maryland	Paul Sarbanes (retired)	63.2% D	Lean D	Lean D	Tossup	Cardin; 54.2% D
Massachusetts	Ted Kennedy	72.9% D	Safe D	Safe D	Safe D	Kennedy; 69.5% D
Michigan	Debbie Stabenow	49.4% D	Likely D	Likely D	Lean D	Stabenow; 56.9% D
Minnesota	Mark Dayton (retired)	48.8% D	Likely D	Safe D	Likely D	Klobuchar; 58.1% D
Mississippi	Trent Lott	65.9% R	Safe R	Safe R	Safe R	Lott; 63.6% R
Missouri	Jim Talent	49.8% R (2002 special) (Note: Democrat Mel Carnahan died on October 16, 2000, due to plane crash having won posthumously in the last general election with 50.4% of the vote.)	Tilt D (flip)	Lean D (flip)	Tossup	McCaskill; 49.6% D (flip)
Montana	Conrad Burns	50.6% R	Lean D (flip)	Lean D (flip)	Tossup	Tester; 49.2% D (flip)
Nebraska	Ben Nelson	51% D	Likely D	Likely D	Safe D	Nelson; 63.9% D
Nevada	John Ensign	55.1% D	Safe R	Safe R	Safe R	Ensign; 55.4% R
New Jersey	Bob Menendez	Appointed (2006) (Note: Democrat Jon Corzine won with 50.1% of the vote in 2000, but resigned on January 17, 2006, to become Governor of New Jersey.)	Tilt D	Lean D	Tossup	Menendez; 53.4% D
New Mexico	Jeff Bingaman	61.7% D	Safe D	Safe D	Safe D	Bingaman; 70.6% D
New York	Hillary Clinton	55% D	Safe D	Safe D	Safe D	Clinton; 67.0% D
North Dakota	Kent Conrad	61.4% D	Safe D	Safe D	Safe D	Conrad; 68.8% D
Ohio	Mike DeWine	59.9% R	Likely D (flip)	Likely D (flip)	Lean D (flip)	Brown; 56.2% D (flip)
Pennsylvania	Rick Santorum	52.4% R	Safe D (flip)	Likely D (flip)	Lean D (flip)	Casey; 58.7% D (flip)
Rhode Island	Lincoln Chafee	56.8% R	Lean D (flip)	Lean D (flip)	Tossup	Whitehouse; 53.5% D (flip)
Tennessee	Bill Frist (retired)	65.1% R	Lean R	Tossup	Tossup	Corker; 50.7% R
Texas	Kay Bailey Hutchison	65% R	Safe R	Safe R	Safe R	Hutchison; 61.7% R
Utah	Orrin Hatch	65.6% R	Safe R	Safe R	Safe R	Hatch; 62.6% R
Vermont	Jim Jeffords (retired)	65.6% R (Note: Jeffords was elected as a Republican in 2000, but left the Republican Party in 2001 and caucused with the Democrats.)	Safe I	Safe I	Likely I	Sanders; 65.4% I
Virginia	George Allen	52.3% R	Tilt D (flip)	Lean D (flip)	Tossup	Webb; 49.6% D (flip)
Washington	Maria Cantwell	48.7% D	Likely D	Likely D	Likely D	Cantwell; 56.9% D
West Virginia	Robert Byrd	77.7% D	Safe D	Safe D	Safe D	Byrd; 64.4% D
Wisconsin	Herb Kohl	61.5% D	Safe D	Safe D	Safe D	Kohl; 67.3% D
Wyoming	Craig L. Thomas	73.7% R	Safe R	Safe R	Safe R	Thomas; 70.0% R

== Race summary ==
=== Special elections during the 109th Congress ===
There were no special elections during the 109th Congress.

=== Elections leading to the next Congress ===
In these general elections, the winners were elected for the term beginning January 3, 2007; ordered by state.

All of the elections involved the Class 1 seats.

State	Incumbent			Result	Candidates
State	Senator	Party	Electoral history	Result	Candidates
Arizona	Jon Kyl	Republican	1994; 2000	Incumbent re-elected.	▌ ✓ Jon Kyl (Republican) 53.3%; ▌Jim Pederson (Democratic) 43.5%; ▌Richard Mack (Libertarian) 3.2%
California	Dianne Feinstein	Democratic	1992 (special); 1994; 2000	Incumbent re-elected.	▌ ✓ Dianne Feinstein (Democratic) 59.4%; ▌Dick Mountjoy (Republican) 35.2%; Others: ▌Don Grundmann (American Independent) 1.8%; ▌Todd Chretien (Green) 1.7%; ▌Michael Metti (Libertarian) 1.6%; ▌Marsha Feinland (Peace and Freedom) 1.3%
Connecticut	Joe Lieberman	Democratic	1988; 1994; 2000	Incumbent lost renomination, but re-elected as an independent. Independent Democratic gain.	▌ ✓ Joe Lieberman (CFL) 49.7%; ▌Ned Lamont (Democratic) 39.7%; ▌Alan Schlesinger (Republican) 9.6%; Others: ▌Ralph Ferrucci (Green) 0.5%; ▌Timothy Knibbs (Concerned Citizens) 0.4%
Delaware	Tom Carper	Democratic	2000	Incumbent re-elected.	▌ ✓ Tom Carper (Democratic) 67.1%; ▌Jan C. Ting (Republican) 27.4%; ▌Christine O'Donnell (Write-in) 4.4%; ▌William E. Morris (Libertarian) 1.1%
Florida	Bill Nelson	Democratic	2000	Incumbent re-elected.	▌ ✓ Bill Nelson (Democratic) 60.3%; ▌Katherine Harris (Republican) 38.1%; Others: ▌Belinda Noah (Independent) 0.5%; ▌Brian Moore (Green) 0.4%; ▌Floyd Ray Frazier (Independent) 0.3%; ▌Roy Tanner (Independent) 0.3%
Hawaii	Daniel Akaka	Democratic	1990 (appointed); 1990 (special); 1994; 2000	Incumbent re-elected.	▌ ✓ Daniel Akaka (Democratic) 61.4%; ▌Cynthia Thielen (Republican) 36.8%; ▌Lloyd Mallan (Libertarian) 1.9%
Indiana	Richard Lugar	Republican	1976; 1982; 1988; 1994; 2000	Incumbent re-elected.	▌ ✓ Richard Lugar (Republican) 87.3%; ▌Steve Osborn (Libertarian) 12.6%
Maine	Olympia Snowe	Republican	1994; 2000	Incumbent re-elected.	▌ ✓ Olympia Snowe (Republican) 74.4%; ▌Jean Hay Bright (Democratic) 20.5%; ▌Bill Slavick (Independent) 5.2%
Maryland	Paul Sarbanes	Democratic	1976; 1982; 1988; 1994; 2000	Incumbent retired. Democratic hold.	▌ ✓ Ben Cardin (Democratic) 54.2%; ▌Michael Steele (Republican) 44.2%; ▌Kevin Zeese (Green) 1.5%
Massachusetts	Ted Kennedy	Democratic	1962 (special); 1964; 1970; 1976; 1982; 1988; 1994; 2000	Incumbent re-elected.	▌ ✓ Ted Kennedy (Democratic) 69.5%; ▌Kenneth Chase (Republican) 30.5%
Michigan	Debbie Stabenow	Democratic	2000	Incumbent re-elected.	▌ ✓ Debbie Stabenow (Democratic) 56.9%; ▌Mike Bouchard (Republican) 41.3%; Others: ▌Leonard Schwartz (Libertarian) 0.7%; ▌David Sole (Green) 0.6%; ▌W. Dennis FitzSimons (Constitution) 0.5%
Minnesota	Mark Dayton	DFL	2000	Incumbent retired. Democratic (DFL) hold.	▌ ✓ Amy Klobuchar (DFL) 58.1%; ▌Mark Kennedy (Republican) 37.9%; ▌Robert Fitzgerald (Independence) 3.2%; Others: ▌Michael Cavlan (Green) 0.5%; ▌Ben Powers (Constitution) 0.3%
Mississippi	Trent Lott	Republican	1988; 1994; 2000	Incumbent re-elected.	▌ ✓ Trent Lott (Republican) 63.6%; ▌Erik Fleming (Democratic) 34.8%; ▌Harold Taylor (Libertarian); 1.5%
Missouri	Jim Talent	Republican	2002 (special)	Incumbent lost re-election. Democratic gain.	▌ ✓ Claire McCaskill (Democratic) 49.6%; ▌Jim Talent (Republican) 47.3%; Others: ▌Frank Gilmour (Libertarian) 1.2%; ▌Lydia Lewis (Green) 0.9%
Montana	Conrad Burns	Republican	1988; 1994; 2000	Incumbent lost re-election. Democratic gain.	▌ ✓ Jon Tester (Democratic) 49.2%; ▌Conrad Burns (Republican) 48.3%; ▌Stan Jones (Libertarian) 2.6%
Nebraska	Ben Nelson	Democratic	2000	Incumbent re-elected.	▌ ✓ Ben Nelson (Democratic) 63.9%; ▌Pete Ricketts (Republican) 36.1%
Nevada	John Ensign	Republican	2000	Incumbent re-elected.	▌ ✓ John Ensign (Republican) 55.4%; ▌Jack Carter (Democratic) 41.0%; Others: None of These Candidates 1.4%; ▌David Schumann (Constitution) 1.3%; ▌Brendan Trainor (Libertarian) 0.9%
New Jersey	Bob Menendez	Democratic	2006 (appointed)	Interim appointee elected.	▌ ✓ Bob Menendez (Democratic) 53.4%; ▌Thomas Kean Jr. (Republican) 44.3%; Others: ▌Len Flynn (Libertarian) 0.7%; ▌Ed Forchion (Marijuana) 0.5%; ▌J. M. Carter (Independent) 0.4%; ▌N. Leonard Smith (Independent) 0.3%; ▌Daryl Brooks (Independent) 0.2%; ▌Angela Lariscy (Socialist Workers) 0.2%; ▌Greg Pason (Socialist) 0.1%
New Mexico	Jeff Bingaman	Democratic	1982; 1988; 1994; 2000	Incumbent re-elected.	▌ ✓ Jeff Bingaman (Democratic) 70.6%; ▌Allen McCulloch (Republican) 29.3%
New York	Hillary Clinton	Democratic	2000	Incumbent re-elected.	▌ ✓ Hillary Clinton (Democratic) 67.0%; ▌John Spencer (Republican) 31.0%; Others: ▌Howie Hawkins (Green) 1.2%; ▌Jeff Russell (Libertarian) 0.4%; ▌Bill Van Auken (Socialist Equality) 0.2%; ▌Róger Calero (Socialist Workers) 0.2%
North Dakota	Kent Conrad	Democratic-NPL	1986; 1992 (retired); 1992 (special); 1994; 2000	Incumbent re-elected.	▌ ✓ Kent Conrad (Democratic-NPL) 68.8%; ▌Dwight Grotberg (Republican) 29.5%; Others: ▌Roland Riemers (Independent) 1.0%; ▌James Germalic (Independent) 0.6%
Ohio	Mike DeWine	Republican	1994; 2000	Incumbent lost re-election. Democratic gain.	▌ ✓ Sherrod Brown (Democratic) 56.2%; ▌Mike DeWine (Republican) 43.8%
Pennsylvania	Rick Santorum	Republican	1994; 2000	Incumbent lost re-election. Democratic gain.	▌ ✓ Bob Casey Jr. (Democratic) 58.7%; ▌Rick Santorum (Republican) 41.3%
Rhode Island	Lincoln Chafee	Republican	1999 (appointed); 2000	Incumbent lost re-election. Democratic gain.	▌ ✓ Sheldon Whitehouse (Democratic) 53.5%; ▌Lincoln Chafee (Republican) 46.5%
Tennessee	Bill Frist	Republican	1994; 2000	Incumbent retired. Republican hold.	▌ ✓ Bob Corker (Republican) 50.7%; ▌Harold Ford Jr. (Democratic) 48.0%; Others: ▌Ed Choate (Independent) 0.6%; ▌David Gatchell (Independent) 0.2%; ▌Emory "Bo" Heyward (Independent) 0.2%; ▌H. Gary Keplinger (Independent) 0.2%; ▌Chris Lugo (Green) 0.1%
Texas	Kay Bailey Hutchison	Republican	1993 (special); 1994; 2000	Incumbent re-elected.	▌ ✓ Kay Bailey Hutchison (Republican) 61.7%; ▌Barbara Ann Radnofsky (Democratic) 36.0%; ▌Scott Jameson (Libertarian) 2.3%
Utah	Orrin Hatch	Republican	1976; 1982; 1988; 1994; 2000	Incumbent re-elected.	▌ ✓ Orrin Hatch (Republican) 62.6%; ▌Pete Ashdown (Democratic) 30.8%; ▌Scott Bradley (Constitution) 3.8%; Others: ▌Roger Price (Personal Choice) 1.6%; ▌Dave Seely (Libertarian) 0.8%; ▌Julian Hatch (Green) 0.4%
Vermont	Jim Jeffords	Independent	1988 (Note: Senator Jim Jeffords was originally elected as a Republican in 1988 and was subsequently re-elected in 1994 and 2000.); 1994; 2000	Incumbent retired. Independent hold.	▌ ✓ Bernie Sanders (Independent) 65.4%; ▌Richard Tarrant (Republican) 32.3%; Others: ▌Cris Ericson (Independent) 0.6%; ▌Craig Hill (Green) 0.5%; ▌Peter Moss (Independent) 0.5%; ▌Peter Diamondstone (Liberty Union) 0.3%
Virginia	George Allen	Republican	2000	Incumbent lost re-election. Democratic gain.	▌ ✓ Jim Webb (Democratic) 49.6%; ▌George Allen (Republican) 49.2%; ▌Gail Parker (Independent Greens) 1.1%
Washington	Maria Cantwell	Democratic	2000	Incumbent re-elected.	▌ ✓ Maria Cantwell (Democratic) 56.9%; ▌Mike McGavick (Republican) 39.9%; Others: ▌Bruce Guthrie (Libertarian) 1.4%; ▌Aaron Dixon (Green) 1.0%; ▌Robin Adair (Independent) 0.8%
West Virginia	Robert Byrd	Democratic	1958; 1964; 1970; 1976; 1982; 1988; 1994; 2000	Incumbent re-elected.	▌ ✓ Robert Byrd (Democratic) 64.4%; ▌John Raese (Republican) 33.7%; ▌Jesse Johnson (Mountain) 1.9%
Wisconsin	Herb Kohl	Democratic	1988; 1994; 2000	Incumbent re-elected.	▌ ✓ Herb Kohl (Democratic) 67.3%; ▌Robert Lorge (Republican) 29.5%; Others: ▌Rae Vogeler (Green) 2.0%; ▌Ben Glatzel (Independent) 1.2%
Wyoming	Craig L. Thomas	Republican	1994; 2000	Incumbent re-elected.	▌ ✓ Craig L. Thomas (Republican) 70.0%; ▌Dale Groutage (Democratic) 29.9%

== Closest races ==
In eight races the margin of victory was under 10%.

District	Winner	Margin
Virginia	Democratic (flip)	0.4% (Note: Virginia was the "tipping point" state.)
Montana	Democratic (flip)	0.9%
Missouri	Democratic (flip)	2.3%
Tennessee	Republican	2.7%
Rhode Island	Democratic (flip)	7.0%
New Jersey	Democratic	9.0%
Arizona	Republican	9.8%
Connecticut	Independent (flip)	9.9%

== Gains and losses ==
Senate composition following the 2006 elections 2 Democrats 2 Republicans 1 Democrat and 1 Republican 1 Democrat and 1 Independent

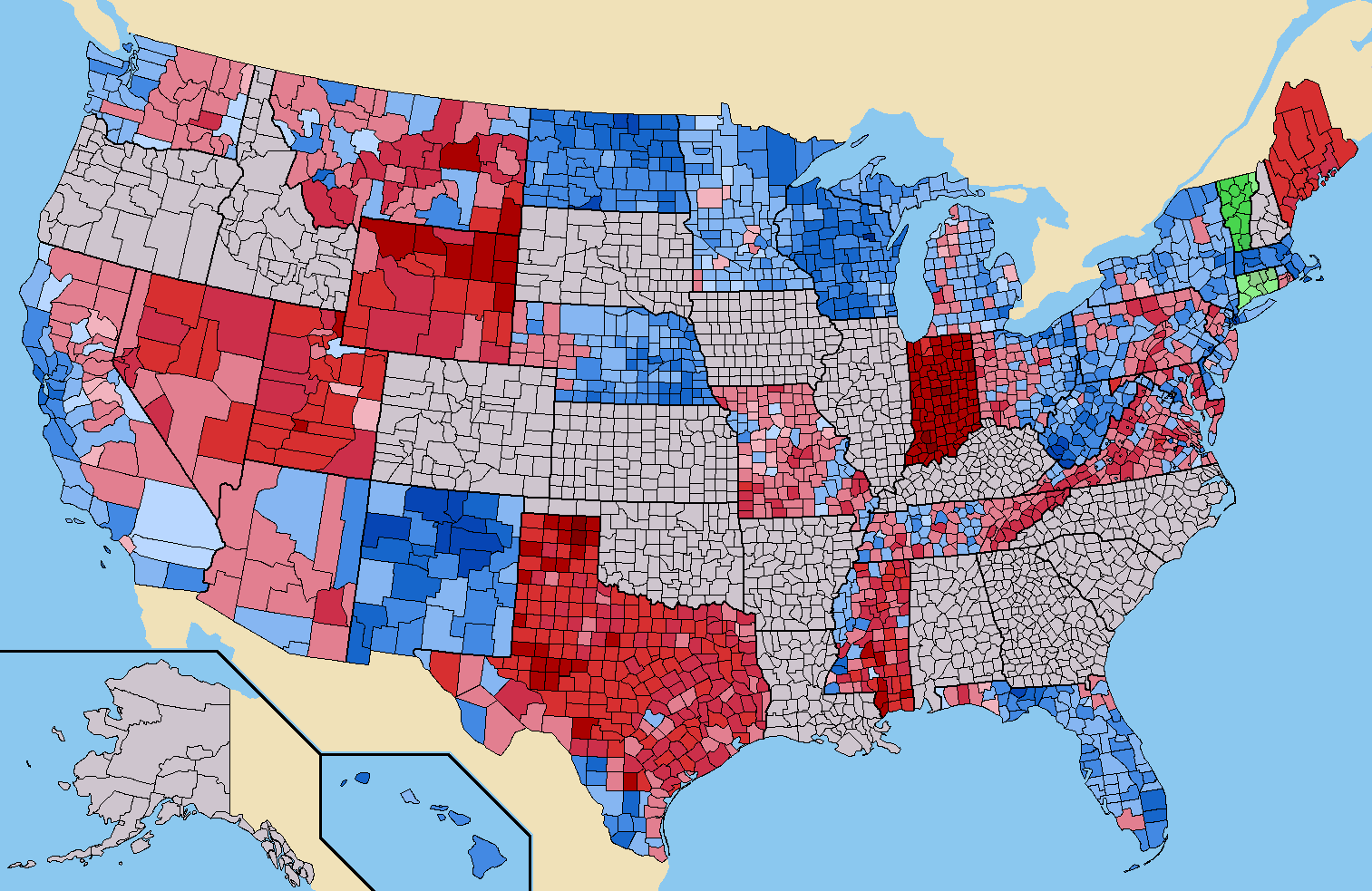
Results of the Senate elections by county

=== Retirements ===
Two Democrats, one Republican, and one Independent retired rather than seek re-election.

State	Senator	Age at end of term	Assumed office	Replaced by
Maryland	Paul Sarbanes	73	1977	Ben Cardin
Minnesota	Mark Dayton	59	2001	Amy Klobuchar
Tennessee	Bill Frist	54	1995	Bob Corker
Vermont	Jim Jeffords	72	1989	Bernie Sanders

=== Defeats ===
Six Republicans and one Democrat sought re-election but lost in the primary or general election.

State	Senator	Age at end of term	Assumed office	Replaced by
Connecticut	Joe Lieberman	—N/a (Note: Although Lieberman ran on the Connecticut for Lieberman party ticket which appeared on the ballot, he sat in the Senate as an Independent Democrat.)		Joe Lieberman
Missouri	Jim Talent	50	2002 (Note: Elected in the special election to finish Mel Carnahan's term.)	Claire McCaskill
Montana	Conrad Burns	71	1989	Jon Tester
Ohio	Mike DeWine	59	1995	Sherrod Brown
Pennsylvania	Rick Santorum	48	1995	Bob Casey Jr.
Rhode Island	Lincoln Chafee	53	1999 (Note: Appointed to the seat following the death of his father, John Chafee.)	Sheldon Whitehouse
Virginia	George Allen	54	2001	Jim Webb

=== Post-election changes ===
One Republican died on June 4, 2007, and was replaced by a Republican appointee on June 22, 2007. One other Republican resigned on December 18, 2007, and was replaced by a Republican appointee on December 31, 2007.

State	Senator	Replaced by
Mississippi (Class 1)	Trent Lott	Roger Wicker
Wyoming (Class 1)	Craig L. Thomas	John Barrasso

== Arizona ==
Arizona election
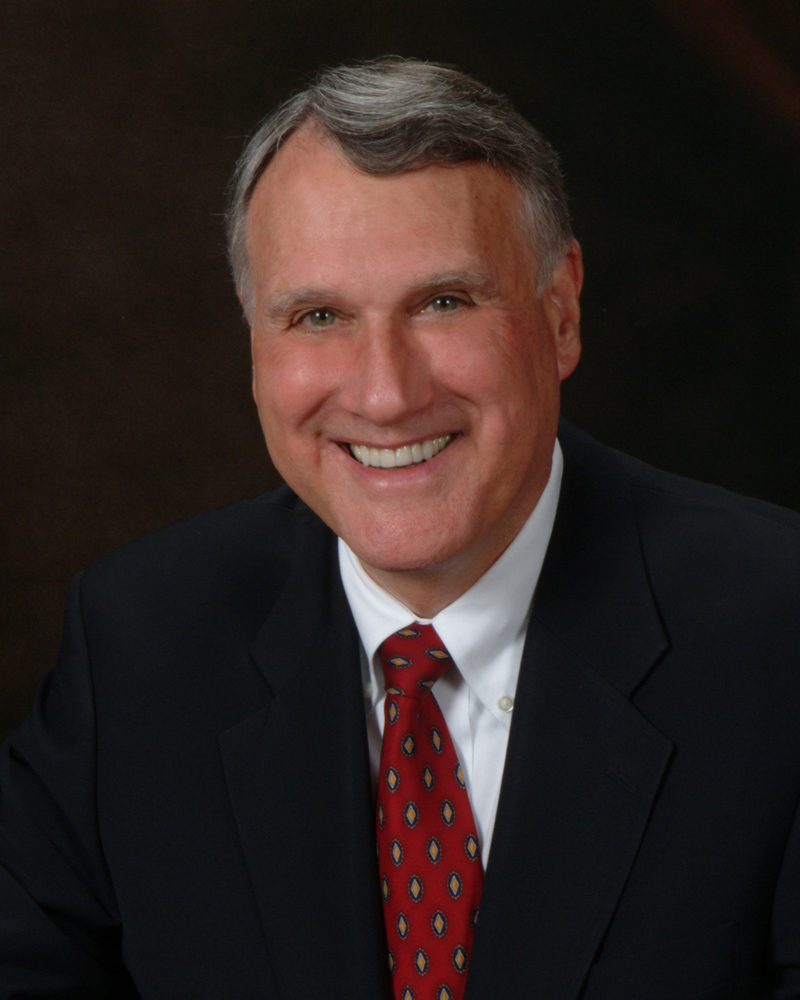

Nominee	Jon Kyl	Jim Pederson
Party	Republican	Democratic
Popular vote	814,398	664,141
Percentage	53.3%	43.5%
- County results Kyl: 50–60% 60–70% Pederson: 50–60% 60–70%
U.S. senator before election
Jon Kyl
Republican
Elected U.S. Senator
Jon Kyl
Republican

Incumbent Republican Jon Kyl won re-election to a third term over Democrat Jim Pederson, real estate developer and former chairman of the Arizona Democratic Party.

Republican primary
Party	Candidate	Votes	%
Republican	Jon Kyl (Incumbent)	297,636	99.5%
Republican	Write-ins	155	0.05%
Total votes		297,791	100.00%

Democratic primary
Party	Candidate	Votes	%
Democratic	Jim Pederson	214,455	100.00%
Total votes		214,455	100.00%

Libertarian primary
Party	Candidate	Votes	%
Libertarian	Richard Mack	3,311	100.00%
Total votes		3,311	100.00%

The incumbent, Republican Jon Kyl, was elected to the Senate in 1994 and was re-elected to a second term in 2000; having previously spent eight years in the U.S. House of Representatives. Kyl's Democratic opponent for the general election was wealthy real-estate developer Jim Pederson, who served as the Arizona Democratic Party Chairman from 2001 to 2005. During his tenure, Pederson spent millions of dollars of his own money to help Democrats modernize and to elect Janet Napolitano as Governor of Arizona. The deadline for signing petition signatures to appear on the September 12, 2006, primary ballot was June 14, 2006.

Not long after the 2004 election, Pederson's name began being mentioned as a potential Senate candidate for the 2006 race. On July 28, 2005, Pederson formally stepped down as Chairman of the Arizona Democratic Party, further fueling those speculations. In early September 2005, an e-mail was sent from the Arizona Democratic Party's website, inviting people to an announcement by Pederson on September 7. In an anticlimactic move, an e-mail was sent out shortly after the first saying that the announcement would be postponed due to Hurricane Katrina. It was requested that any money that would be donated to Pederson's campaign at the announcement be directed to relief efforts instead. Similarly, a meeting in Arizona of the Democratic National Committee (DNC) was scheduled for around the same time. It was also postponed and the same request was made involving donations. On September 7, 2005, Pederson filed to run for the U.S. Senate. On September 14, 2005, Pederson formally announced his intention to run, in his hometown of Casa Grande, Arizona.

Although Kyl started the campaign with a sizable lead in most polls, the gap quickly narrowed, especially after Pederson released his array of ads.

Pederson lost the election by 9.84% or 150,257 votes, despite Democratic Incumbent Governor Janet Napolitano easily being re-elected and winning every county statewide. While Pederson lost it was still notable, as it was the worst performance of Senator Kyl's career. Kyl did well as Republicans usually do in Maricopa County home of Phoenix. Pederson did well in Pima County home of Tucson which tends to support Democrats. Kyl was called the winner by CNN at around 8 P.M. local time, 11 P.M. EST. Pederson called Senator Kyl and conceded defeat at 9:02 p.m. local time, 12:02 A.M. EST.

Arizona general election
Party	Candidate	Votes	%	±%
Republican	Jon Kyl (Incumbent)	814,398	53.34%	−25.98%
Democratic	Jim Pederson	664,141	43.50%	+43.50%
Libertarian	Richard Mack	48,231	3.16%	−1.90%
Write-ins		13	0.00%	
Majority		150,257	9.84%	61.66%
Turnout		1,526,782		
Republican hold		Swing		

== California ==
California election
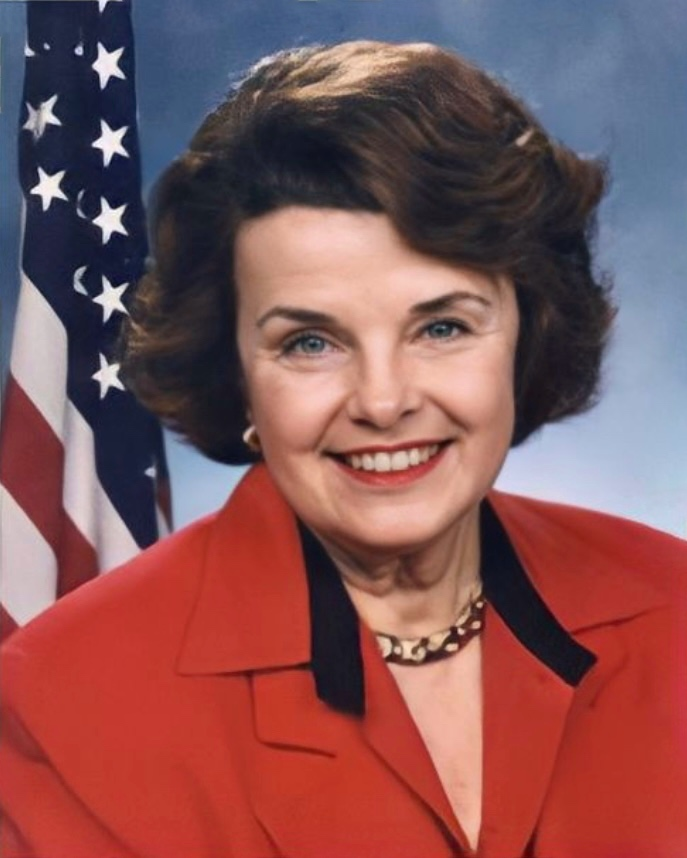

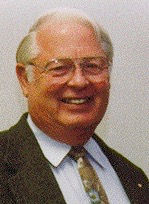
Nominee	Dianne Feinstein	Dick Mountjoy
Party	Democratic	Republican
Popular vote	5,076,289	2,990,822
Percentage	59.43%	35.02%
- County results Feinstein: 40–50% 50–60% 60–70% 70–80% 80–90% Mountjoy: 40–50% 50–60%
U.S. senator before election
Dianne Feinstein
Democratic
Elected U.S. Senator
Dianne Feinstein
Democratic

Incumbent Democrat Dianne Feinstein won re-election to her third full term.

The Republican candidate was Dick Mountjoy, who had never held a statewide elected position, but had been a state senator for several years. Also running was Libertarian Michael Metti, Don Grundmann of the American Independent Party, Todd Chretien of the Green Party and Marsha Feinland of the Peace and Freedom Party.

Because California is a state that requires a large amount of money to wage a competitive statewide campaign, it is not unusual - as was the case for this race - for a popular incumbent to have no significant opponent. Several prominent Republicans, such as Bill Jones, Matt Fong, and others, declined to run, and a previous announced challenger, businessman Bill Mundell, withdrew his declaration after determining he would not be a self-funded candidate (like Michael Huffington was in the 1994 election).

Democratic primary
Candidate	Votes	%
Dianne Feinstein (Incumbent)	2,176,888	86.95%
Colleen Fernald	199,180	7.96%
Martin Luther Church	127,301	5.09%
Total votes	2,503,369	100.00%

Green primary
Candidate	Votes	%
Todd Chretien	12,821	46.14%
Tian Harter	10,318	37.13%
Kent Mesplay	4,649	16.73%
Total votes	27,788	100.00%

Other primaries
Party	Candidate	Votes	%
Republican	Dick Mountjoy	1,560,472	100.00%
American Independent	Don J. Grundmann	30,787	100.00%
Libertarian	Michael S. Metti	16,742	100.00%
Peace and Freedom	Marsha Feinland	4,109	100.00%

On September 22, the Los Angeles Times reported that Mountjoy's official biography, as found on his campaign website, falsely asserted that he had served aboard the battleship USS Missouri during the Korean War—he'd actually served aboard the heavy cruiser USS Bremerton. A review of the ships' logs corroborated this and the website was quickly changed to reflect his service aboard the Bremerton rather than the Missouri. Mountjoy denied having been responsible for adding the incorrect information

Feinstein won the election easily. Feinstein won almost every major urban area, winning in Los Angeles, San Francisco, Sacramento, and San Diego. Feinstein was projected the winner as the polls closed at 11 p.m. EST.

2006 United States Senate election in California
Party	Candidate	Votes	%
Democratic	Dianne Feinstein (incumbent)	5,076,289	59.43%
Republican	Dick Mountjoy	2,990,822	35.02%
Green	Todd Chretien	147,074	1.72%
Libertarian	Michael S. Metti	133,851	1.57%
Peace and Freedom	Marsha Feinland	117,764	1.38%
American Independent	Don Grundmann	75,350	0.88%
Green	Kent Mesplay (write-in)	160	0.00%
Independent	Jeffrey Mackler (write-in)	108	0.00%
Independent	Lea Sherman (write-in)	47	0.00%
Independent	Connor Vlakancic (write-in)	11	0.00%
Invalid or blank votes		357,583	4.19%
Total votes		8,899,059	100.00%
Turnout			53.93%
Democratic hold			

== Connecticut ==
Connecticut election
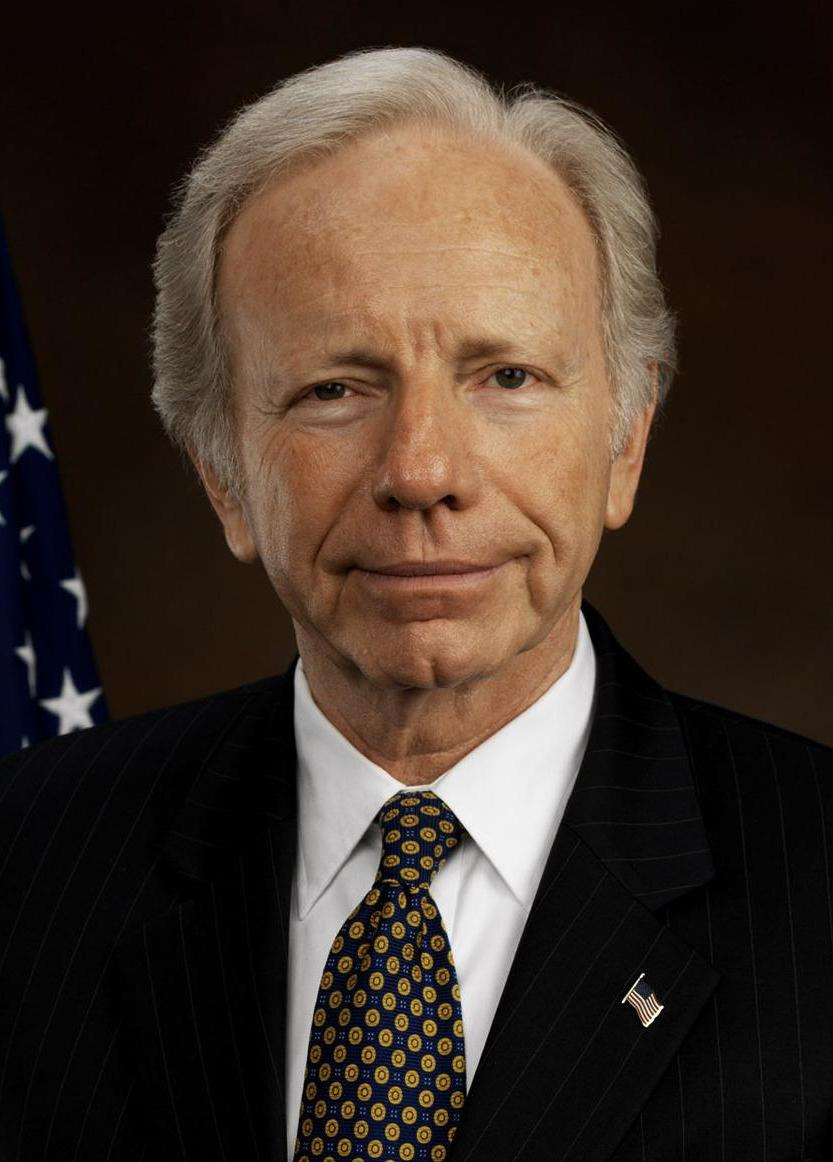

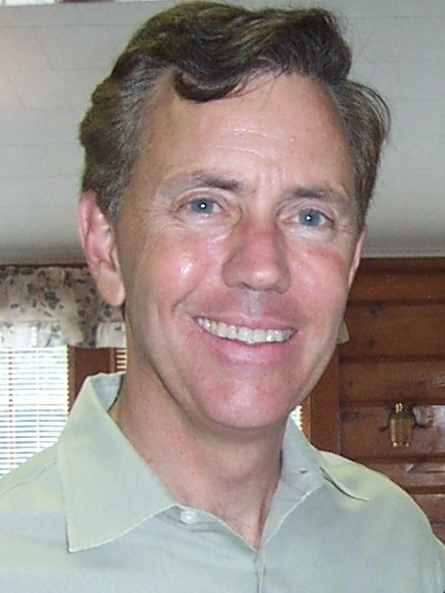

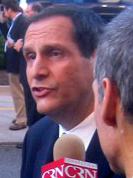
Nominee	Joe Lieberman	Ned Lamont	Alan Schlesinger
Party	Connecticut for Lieberman	Democratic	Republican
Popular vote	564,095	450,844	109,198
Percentage	49.7%	39.7%	9.6%
- Lieberman: 40–50% 50–60% 60–70% Lamont: 40–50% 50–60% 60–70%
U.S. senator before election
Joe Lieberman
Democratic
Elected U.S. Senator
Joe Lieberman
Connecticut for Lieberman

Incumbent Democrat Joe Lieberman lost the August 8 Democratic primary to cable executive Ned Lamont, a former Greenwich selectman. Lieberman formed his own third party and won in the general election to a fourth term.

Because Connecticut was believed to be a Democratic stronghold, Connecticut's Senate seat was considered safe to remain as a Democratic seat by political analysts, but Lieberman's continued support for conservative and Bush administration policies made him vulnerable to a Democratic primary challenger. Lieberman's critics objected to what they call Lieberman's lack of commitment to the Democratic party; his opposition to affirmative action; his opposition to a Connecticut state law that would require Catholic hospitals to provide emergency contraception to rape victims; his membership in the bipartisan Gang of 14; his support of Florida governor Jeb Bush in the Terri Schiavo case; his initial willingness to compromise on Social Security privatization; his alliances with Republicans; and his attacks on other Democrats.

On March 13, 2006, Ned Lamont announced his candidacy for the Democratic nomination. Lamont was more liberal than Lieberman, but he was not immune from criticism from within his own party. The New Republic senior editor and "liberal hawk" Jonathan Chait criticized Lamont's supporters by comparing them to activists who he felt "tore the party apart" in the 1960s and 70s.

Early polling showed Lieberman with as much as a 46-point lead, but subsequent polls showed Lamont gaining until Lamont took the lead just weeks before the primary. A controversy about a "kiss" Lieberman supposedly received from President Bush during the 2005 State of the Union address highlighted concerns that the senator was too close to the unpopular president to be a credible Democratic nominee. Lieberman released several campaign advertisements over the summer of 2006, seeking to connect himself to former President Bill Clinton and to portray Lamont as standing for little more than opposition to Lieberman. Lamont struck back against some of Lieberman's more negative ads with an advertisement produced by well-known political consultant Bill Hillsman. In Lamont's ad, a foreboding narrator says, "Meet Ned Lamont. He can't make a decent cup of coffee, he's a bad karaoke singer, and he has a messy desk." Lamont then chimes in, "Aren't you sick of political attack ads that insult your intelligence? Senator Lieberman, let's stick to issues and pledge to support whoever wins the Democratic primary."

From midmorning August 7 to well past August 9, Lieberman's official campaign site was taken offline; officials from Lieberman's campaign claimed, "dirty politics" and "Rovian tactics" on the part of Lamont's supporters, and more specifically, a sustained Distributed Denial of Service attack that, according to the Lieberman campaign, had left the site down for several days.

Tim Tagaris, Lamont's Internet communications director, denied the charge and attributed the downtime to the fact that the Lieberman campaign had chosen an inferior web host, or ISP, and was only paying $15/month to operate its site (in comparison to the $1500/month being spent by the Lamont campaign). On December 20, 2006, a joint investigation by Connecticut Attorney General Richard Blumenthal's office and the U.S. attorney's office cleared the Lamont campaign of the hacking accusations. A spokesman for Kevin O'Connor, the U.S. Attorney for Connecticut, stated, "The investigation has revealed no evidence the problems the Web site experienced were the result of criminal conduct."

Lamont won the primary with 51.79% of the vote, as opposed to Lieberman's 48.21%. However, in his concession speech, Lieberman announced that he would stand by his prior statements that he'd run as an independent if he lost the Democratic primary.

In the Republican Party primary, Alan Schlesinger drew fire in July when it was revealed that he had been gambling under an alias in order to avoid detection as a card counter. Despite calls to withdraw from the race, Schlesinger remained in the race, ultimately becoming the Republican nominee when no other Republican challengers entered the race.

Democratic Primary
Party	Candidate	Votes	%
Democratic	Ned Lamont	146,587	51.8%
Democratic	Joseph Lieberman (Incumbent)	136,468	48.2%
Total votes		283,055	100.0%

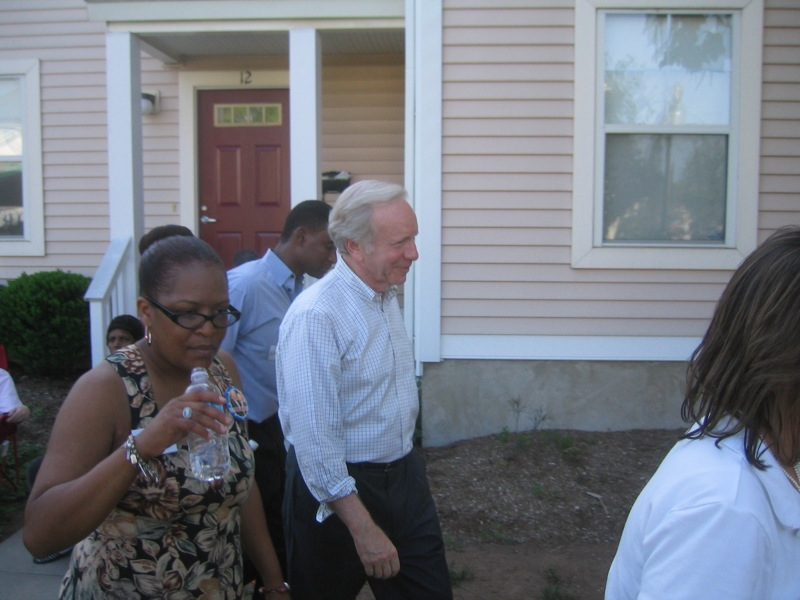
Lieberman during his re-election campaign on a third party ticket

On June 12, Ned Lamont began running radio ads promising if he lost the primary to endorse Lieberman, challenging Lieberman to abandon consideration of an independent run by making a similar pledge. Lieberman refused to make this pledge; his campaign manager, Sean Smith said, "Are we going to support Ned Lamont? Ah, no!"

On July 3 in Hartford, Lieberman announced that he would collect signatures in order to guarantee himself a position on the November ballot. Both Lieberman and Smith said that Lieberman will run as a "petitioning Democrat" and would caucus with Senate Democrats if elected. On July 10, the Lieberman campaign officially filed paperwork allowing him to collect signatures to form a new political party, the Connecticut for Lieberman party.

Upon Lieberman's announcement, independent polls continued to show him favored to win a plurality or outright majority of the vote in a three-way general election (see below). The petition issue led to charges against the Lieberman campaign of political opportunism and lack of respect for the political process. Lieberman received strong support from many prominent conservative pundits and publications. "[H]is most vocal support came from places like The Weekly Standard, National Review, and Commentary Magazine; Sean Hannity, Bill Kristol and right-wing radio hosts cheered for his victory." Thus, "Lieberman was able to run in the general election as the de facto Republican candidate — every major Republican office-holder in the state endorsed him — and to supplement that GOP base with strong support from independents."

On August 9, Democratic Senate Minority Leader Harry Reid and DSCC Chair Chuck Schumer issued the following joint statement on the Connecticut Senate race:

The Democratic voters of Connecticut have spoken and chosen Ned Lamont as their nominee. Both we and the Democratic Senatorial Campaign Committee (DSCC) fully support Mr. Lamont's candidacy. Congratulations to Ned on his victory and on a race well run. Joe Lieberman has been an effective Democratic Senator for Connecticut and for America. But the perception was that he was too close to George Bush and this election was, in many respects, a referendum on the President more than anything else. The results bode well for Democratic victories in November and our efforts to take the country in a new direction.

According to The Hill, a Democratic aide to a high-ranking senator commented that Lieberman might be stripped of his Democratic privileges in the Senate. "At this point Lieberman cannot expect to just keep his seniority," said the aide. "He can't run against a Democrat and expect to waltz back to the caucus with the same seniority as before. It would give the view that the Senate is a country club rather than representative of a political party and political movement."

Lieberman won with approximately 50% of the vote, and served a six-year term from January 3, 2007, to January 3, 2013. Exit polls showed that Lieberman won the vote of 33% of Democrats, 54% of independents and 70% of Republicans. Lieberman won every county in the November general election.

2006 United States Senate election, Connecticut
Party	Candidate	Votes	%
Independent Democrat	Joe Lieberman (incumbent)	564,095	49.7%
Democratic	Ned Lamont	450,844	39.7%
Republican	Alan Schlesinger	109,198	9.6%
Green	Ralph Ferrucci	5,922	0.6%
Concerned Citizens	Timothy Knibbs	4,638	0.4%
Write-in	Carl E. Vassar	80	0.0%
Majority		113,251	10.0%
Turnout		1,134,777	
Independent Democrat gain from Democratic			

== Delaware ==
Delaware election
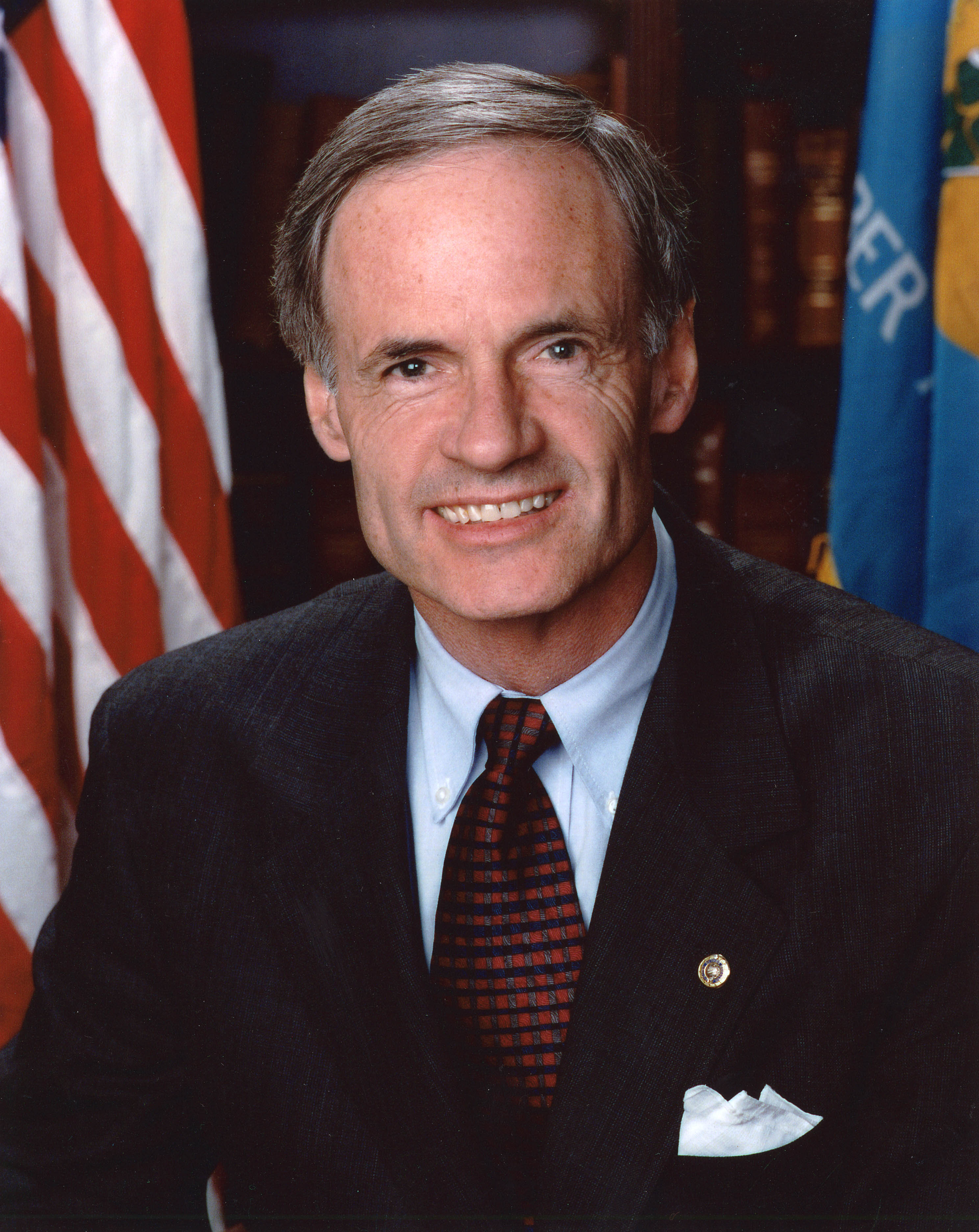

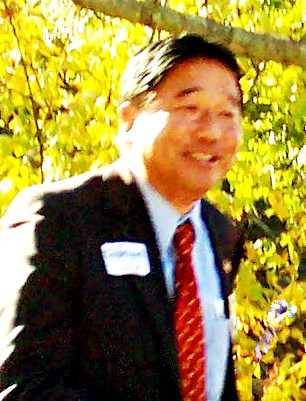
Nominee	Tom Carper	Jan Ting
Party	Democratic	Republican
Popular vote	170,567	69,744
Percentage	67.1%	27.4%
- County results Carper: 50–60% 60–70% 70–80%
U.S. senator before election
Thomas Carper
Democratic
Elected U.S. Senator
Thomas Carper
Democratic

Incumbent Democrat Thomas R. Carper won re-election to a second term over a Republican Temple University law professor, Jan C. Ting.

Republican primary
Party	Candidate	Votes	%
Republican	Jan Ting	6,110	42.47%
Republican	Michael D. Protack	5,771	40.12%
Republican	Christine O'Donnell	2,505	17.41%
Total votes		14,386	100.00%

Delaware general election
Party	Candidate	Votes	%	±%
Democratic	Thomas Carper (Incumbent)	170,567	67.13%	+11.60%
Republican	Jan Ting	69,734	27.44%	−16.26%
Write-in	Christine O'Donnell	11,127	4.38%	
Independent Party	Karen M. Hartley-Nagle	5,769	2.2%	
Libertarian	William E. Morris	2,671	1.05%	+0.71%
Majority		100,833	39.68%	+27.85%
Turnout		254,099		
Democratic hold		Swing		

== Florida ==
Florida election
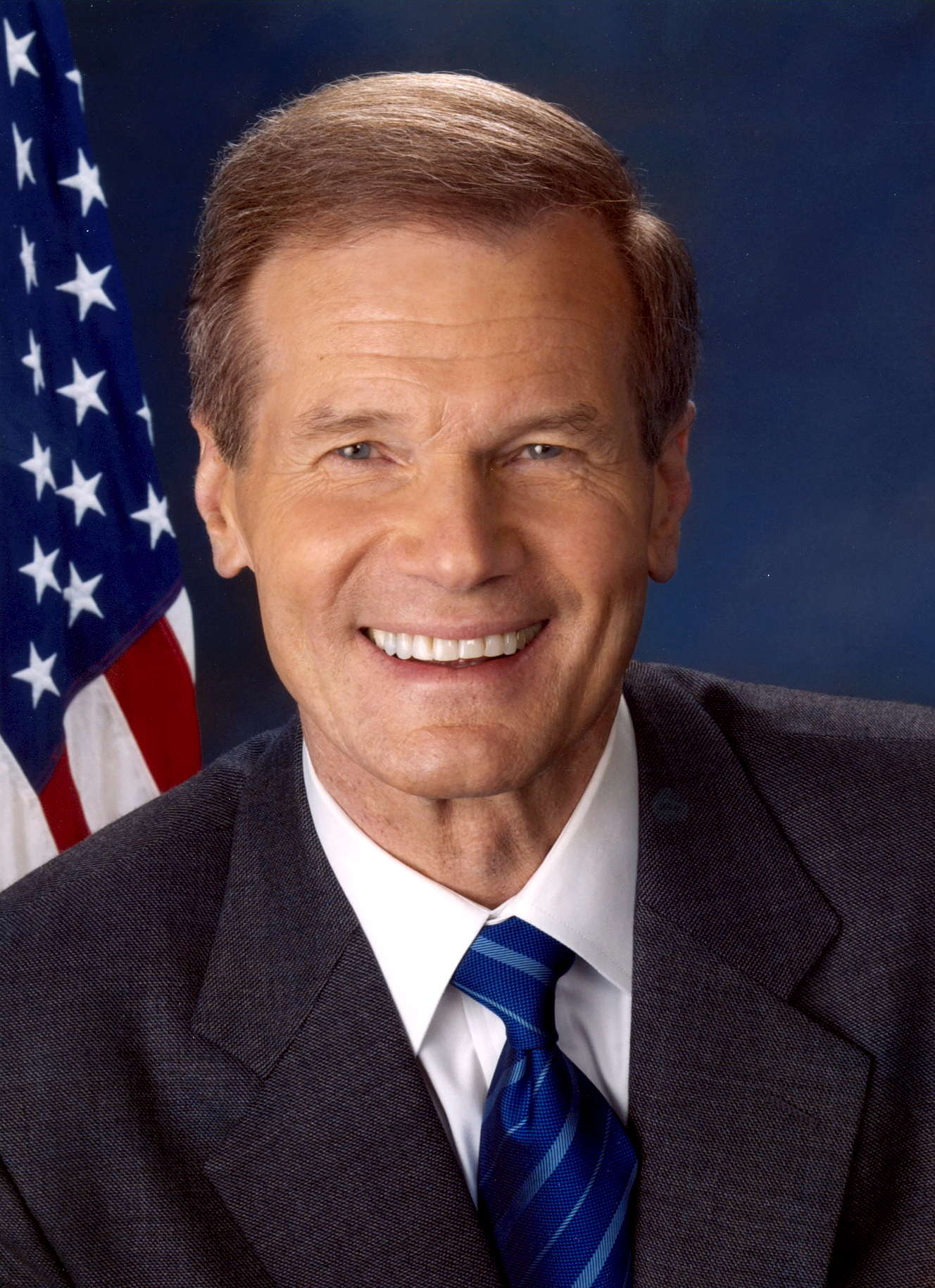

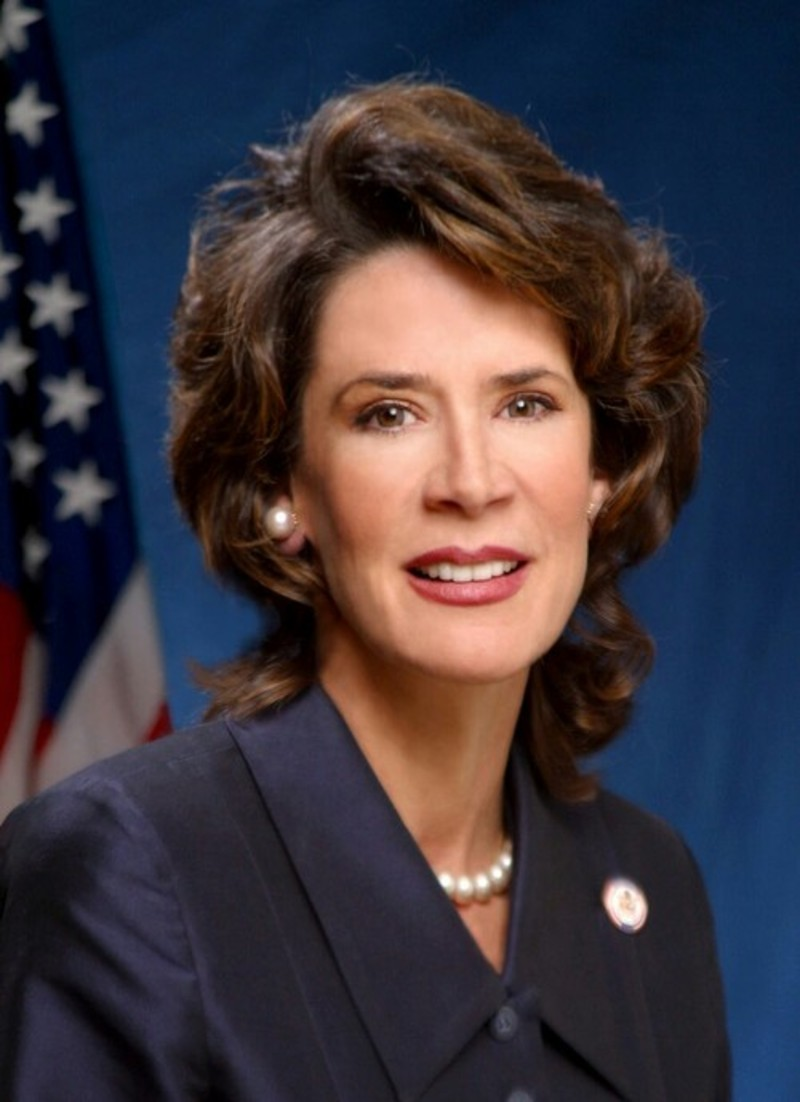
Nominee	Bill Nelson	Katherine Harris
Party	Democratic	Republican
Popular vote	2,890,548	1,826,127
Percentage	60.3%	38.1%
- County results Nelson: 40–50% 50–60% 60–70% 70–80% 80–90% Harris: 40–50% 50–60% 60–70%
U.S. senator before election
Bill Nelson
Democratic
Elected U.S. Senator
Bill Nelson
Democratic

Incumbent Democrat Bill Nelson won re-election to a second term over Republican congresswoman Katherine Harris.

Republican primary
Party	Candidate	Votes	%
Republican	Katherine Harris	474,871	49.4%
Republican	Will McBride	287,741	30.0%
Republican	LeRoy Collins Jr.	146,712	15.3%
Republican	Peter Monroe	51,330	5.3%
Turnout		960,654	100.00%

The organization Citizens for Responsibility and Ethics in Washington, which monitors political corruption, complained to the Federal Election Commission (FEC) in October 2006 that the Bacardi beverage company had illegally used corporate resources in support of a fundraising event for Nelson in 2005. CREW had previously filed a similar complaint concerning a Bacardi fundraising event for Republican Senator Mel Martinez, an event that raised as much as $60,000 for Martinez's campaign. The amended complaint alleged that, on both occasions, Bacardi violated the Federal Election Campaign Act and FEC regulations by soliciting contributions from a list of the corporation's vendors.

Nelson was easily re-elected, winning all but 10 of Florida's 67 counties and receiving 60.3% of the vote, winning by 1,064,421 votes or 22.2%. Nelson was projected the winner as the polls closed at 7 p.m. EST.

Florida general election
Party	Candidate	Votes	%	±%
Democratic	Bill Nelson (Incumbent)	2,890,548	60.3%	+9.8%
Republican	Katherine Harris	1,826,127	38.1%	−8.1%
Independent	Belinda Noah	24,880	0.5%	n/a
Independent	Brian Moore	19,695	0.4%	n/a
Independent	Floyd Ray Frazier	16,628	0.3%	n/a
Independent	Roy Tanner	15,562	0.3%	n/a
Write-ins		94	0.0%	n/a
Majority		1,064,421	22.2%	+17.4%
Turnout		4,793,534		
Democratic hold		Swing		

== Hawaii ==
Hawaii election
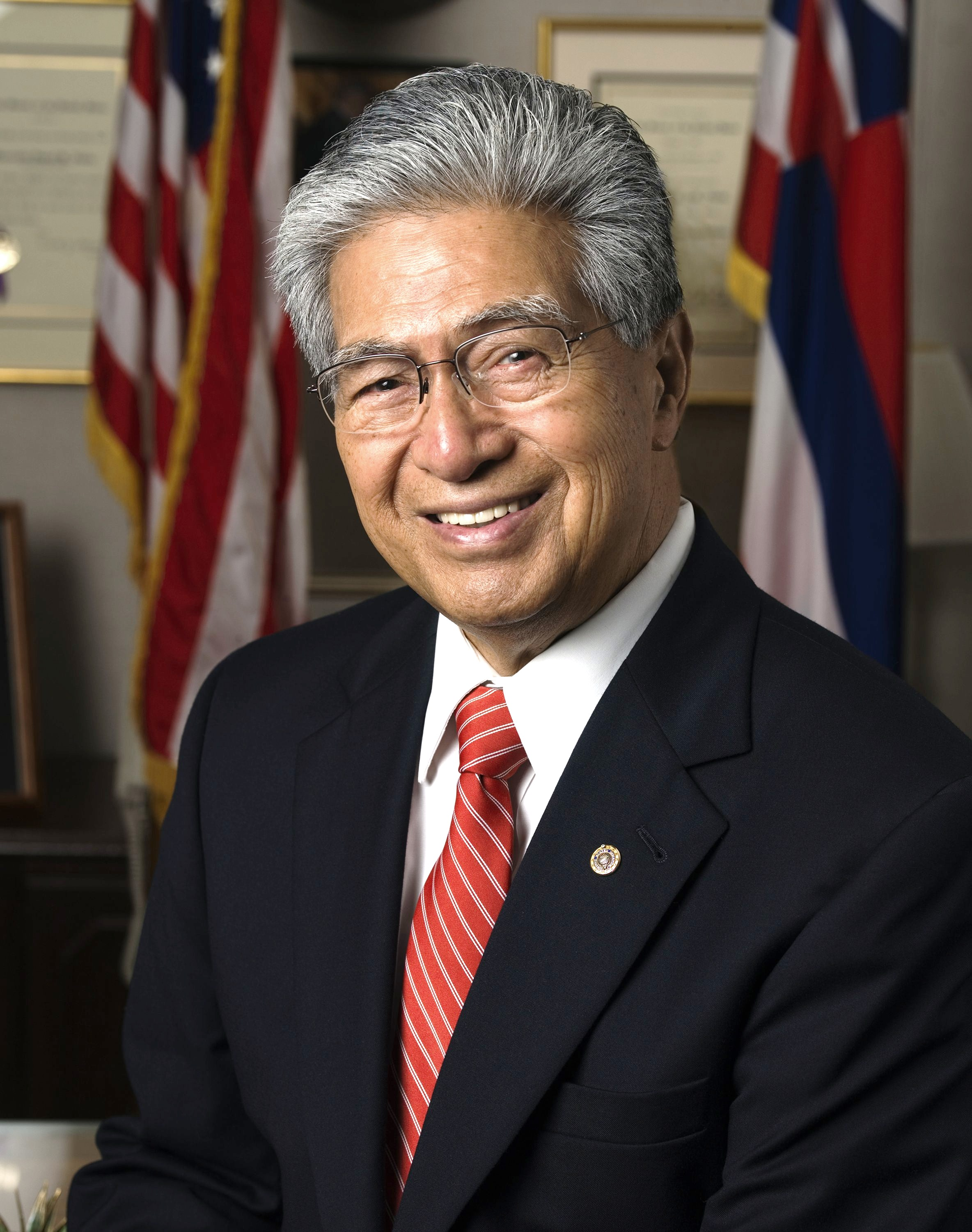

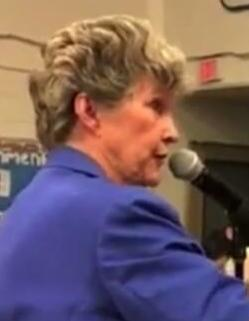
Nominee	Daniel Akaka	Cynthia Thielen
Party	Democratic	Republican
Popular vote	210,330	126,097
Percentage	61.4%	36.8%
- County results Akaka: 50–60% 60–70% 70–80%
U.S. senator before election
Daniel Akaka
Democratic
Elected U.S. Senator
Daniel Akaka
Democratic

Incumbent Democrat Daniel Akaka won re-election to his third full term over Republican State Representative Cynthia Thielen.

Democratic congressman Ed Case ran against Akaka in the Democratic Primary, having stated that although he had the deepest respect for Akaka, Hawaii was in a time of transition with regard to the state's representation in Congress which required that the state elect Senators of the next generation to provide continuity. He warned the state would lose all clout in Washington if the state's two US Senators, both of whom were over 80 years old, left office within a short time of each other. If a Senator were to die, Hawaii election law requires that the governor appoint a replacement of the same party.

Hawaii's other Representative, Neil Abercrombie, and other Senator, Daniel Inouye, pledged their support to Akaka, who won the primary with 55% of the vote.

Democratic primary
Party	Candidate	Votes	%
Democratic	Daniel K. Akaka (Incumbent)	129,158	55%
Democratic	Ed Case	107,163	45%
Total votes		236,321	100%

Republican primary
Party	Candidate	Votes	%
Republican	Jerry Coffee	10,139	41.01%
Republican	Mark Beatty	6,057	24.50%
Republican	Akacase Collins	3,146	12.72%
Republican	Jay Friedheim	2,299	9.30%
Republican	Steve Tataii	1,601	6.48%
Republican	Eddie Pirkowski	1,482	5.99%
Total votes		24,724	100%

Hawaii State Representative Cynthia Thielen was selected to be the Republican nominee after Jerry Coffee, who had previously withdrawn his candidacy, won the primary. Akaka won in all 4 Hawaii counties, taking at least 60% of the vote in each area.

Hawaii general election
Party	Candidate	Votes	%	±%
Democratic	Daniel Akaka (Incumbent)	210,330	61.4%	−11.5%
Republican	Cynthia Thielen	126,097	36.8%	+12.3%
Libertarian	Lloyd Mallan	6,415	1.9%	+1.0%
Majority		84,233	24.6%	
Turnout		342,842		
Democratic hold		Swing		

== Indiana ==
Indiana election
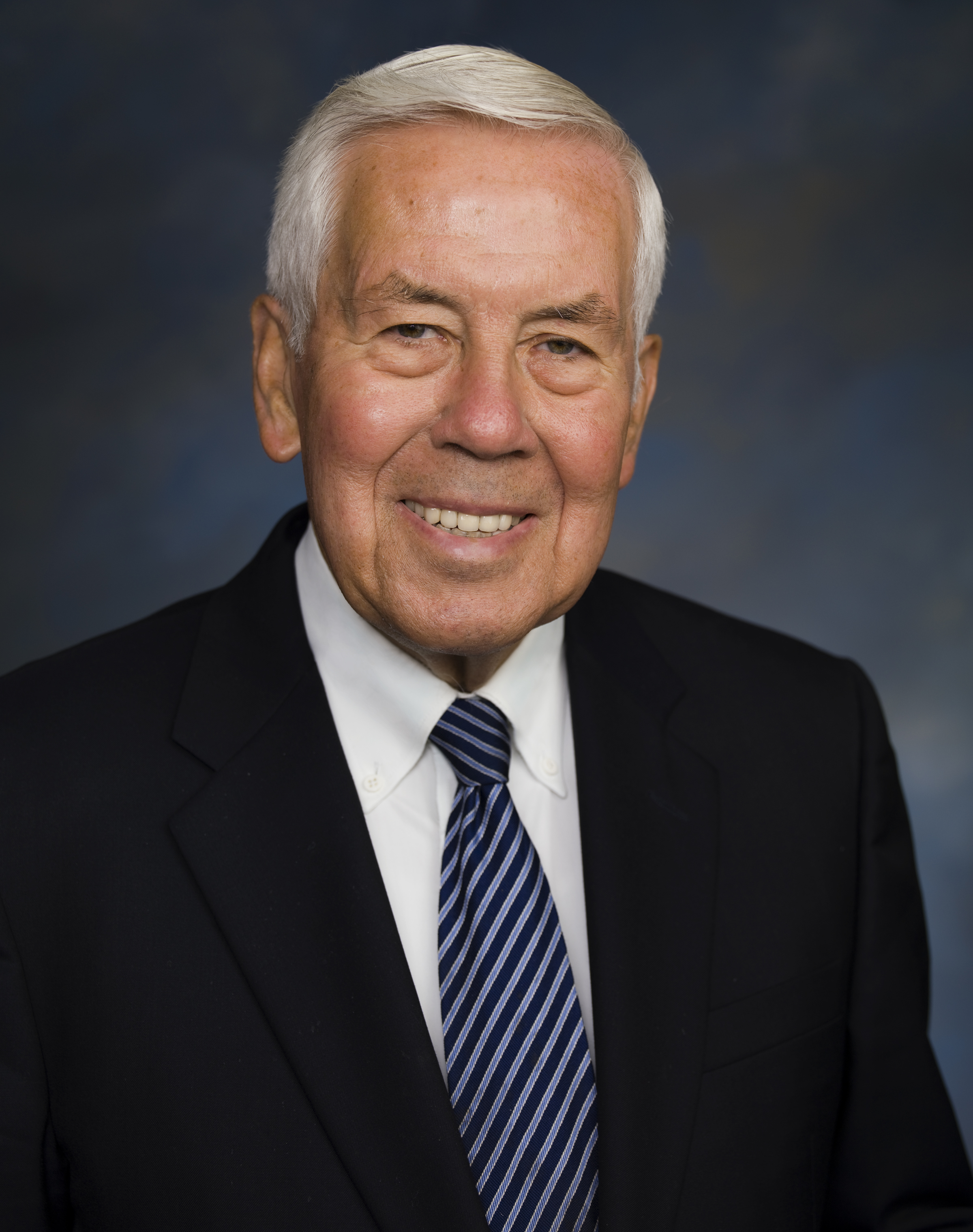

Nominee	Richard Lugar	Steve Osborn
Party	Republican	Libertarian
Popular vote	1,171,553	168,820
Percentage	87.3%	12.6%
- County results Lugar: 70–80% 80–90% >90%
U.S. senator before election
Richard Lugar
Republican
Elected U.S. Senator
Richard Lugar
Republican

Incumbent Republican Richard Lugar was unopposed by any Democratic candidate and was re-elected to his sixth six-year term with 87.3% of the vote over Libertarian radio operator Steve Osborn. This would be Lugar's last successful campaign of his political career.

Lugar faced no opposition from the Democratic Party, as they felt Lugar was unbeatable. The Indiana Senate race was the only one in 2006 where the incumbent faced no challenger from the other major party. Also running was Libertarian Steve Osborn. Osborn was from La Porte, Indiana, and was an amateur radio operator. Exit polls projected a landslide victory for Lugar which was borne out by the result.

The election was not close, with Lugar winning every county. Osborn's best performance was in Switzerland County, where he received just over 22% of the vote.

General election
Party	Candidate	Votes	%	±%
Republican	Richard Lugar (Incumbent)	1,171,553	87.3%	
Libertarian	Steve Osborn	168,820	12.6%	
No party	Write-Ins	738	0.1%	
Majority		1,002,733		
Turnout		1,341,111	40%	
Republican hold		Swing		

== Maine ==
Maine election
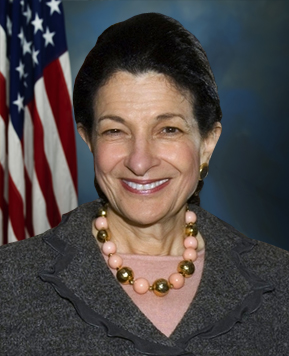

Nominee	Olympia Snowe	Jean Hay Bright
Party	Republican	Democratic
Popular vote	402,598	111,984
Percentage	74.01%	20.59%
Nominee	Bill Slavick
Party	Independent
Popular vote	29,220
Percentage	5.37%
- Snowe: 50–60% 60–70% 70–80% 80–90% >90% Bright: 40–50% Slavick: 80–90%
U.S. senator before election
Olympia Snowe
Republican
Elected U.S. Senator
Olympia Snowe
Republican

Incumbent Republican Olympia Snowe won re-election to a third term over Democratic activist Jean Hay Bright.

Snowe, who had been elected to both of her previous terms by approximately 2-to-1 margins, had never lost an election. Snowe won by a landslide even as Democrats won across the country due to her being a centrist Republican and having a very high approval rating in Maine. Meanwhile, her Democratic opponent in the 2006 election, Jean Hay Bright, had never been elected to political office.

Democrats' best hope for taking the seat was that Snowe would retire rather than run in 2006, but there was never any indication that she seriously considered not running for re-election.

The filing deadline for major party candidates was March 15, 2006. The primary was held June 13, 2006. Olympia Snowe was unopposed for the Republican nomination; Jean Hay Bright narrowly won the Democratic nod with 50.7% of the vote against Eric Mehnert.

Hay Bright announced her candidacy in May 2005. Hay Bright was previously an unsuccessful candidate for the Democratic nomination to the House in 1994 and the Senate in 1996.

The race had been called by FOX News for Snowe 23 minutes after the polls had closed. Snowe won re-election by a greater margin than any U.S. Senator that cycle except Indiana's Richard Lugar, who faced only a Libertarian opponent. Snowe won in all of Maine's counties, taking at least 60% of the vote in each region.

Maine general election
Party	Candidate	Votes	%	±%
Republican	Olympia Snowe (Incumbent)	402,598	74.01%	+5.5%
Democratic	Jean Hay Bright	111,984	20.59%	−10.6%
Independent	Bill Slavick	29,220	5.37%	n/a
Majority		290,614	53.42%	
Turnout		543,802		
Republican hold		Swing		

== Maryland ==
Maryland election
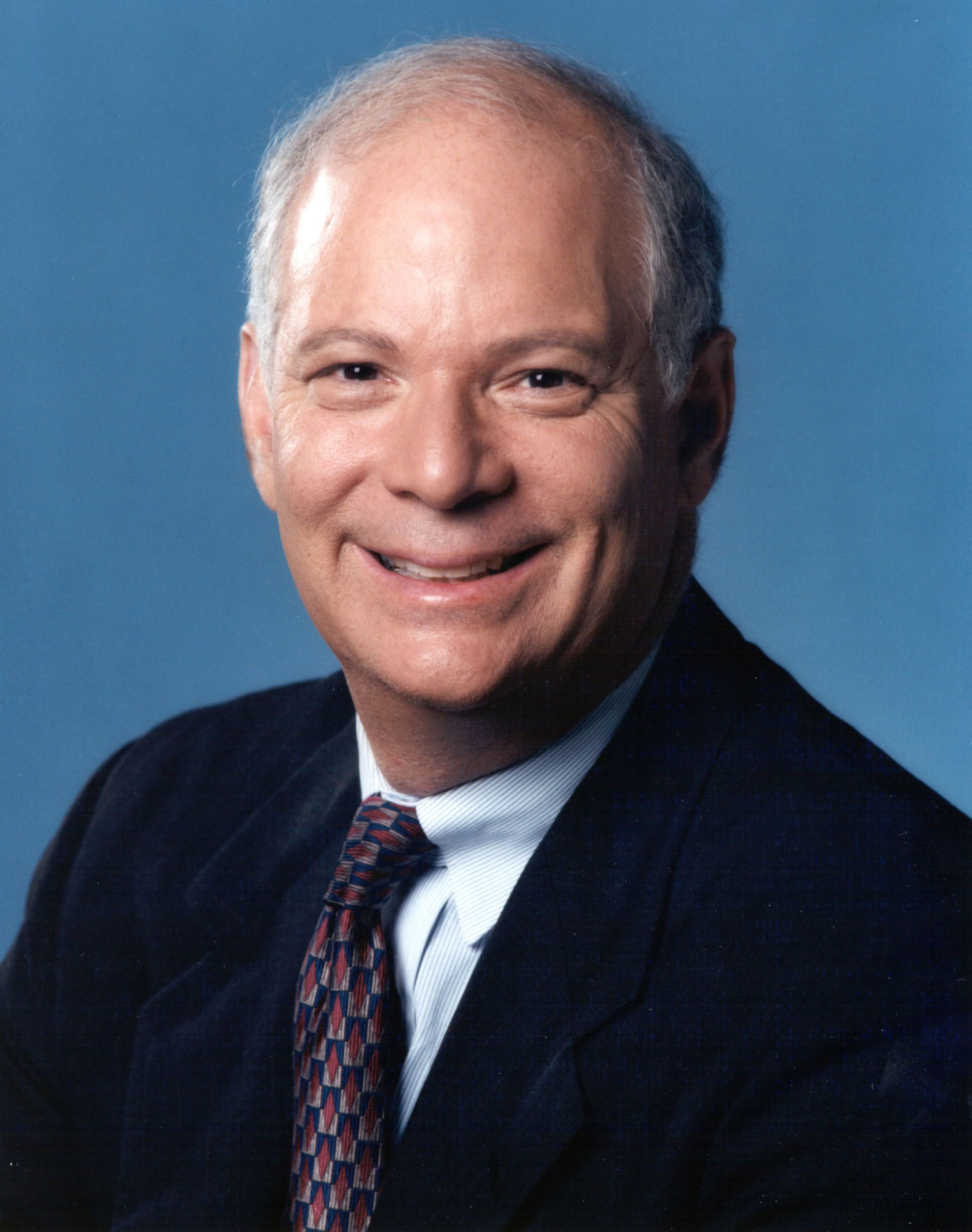

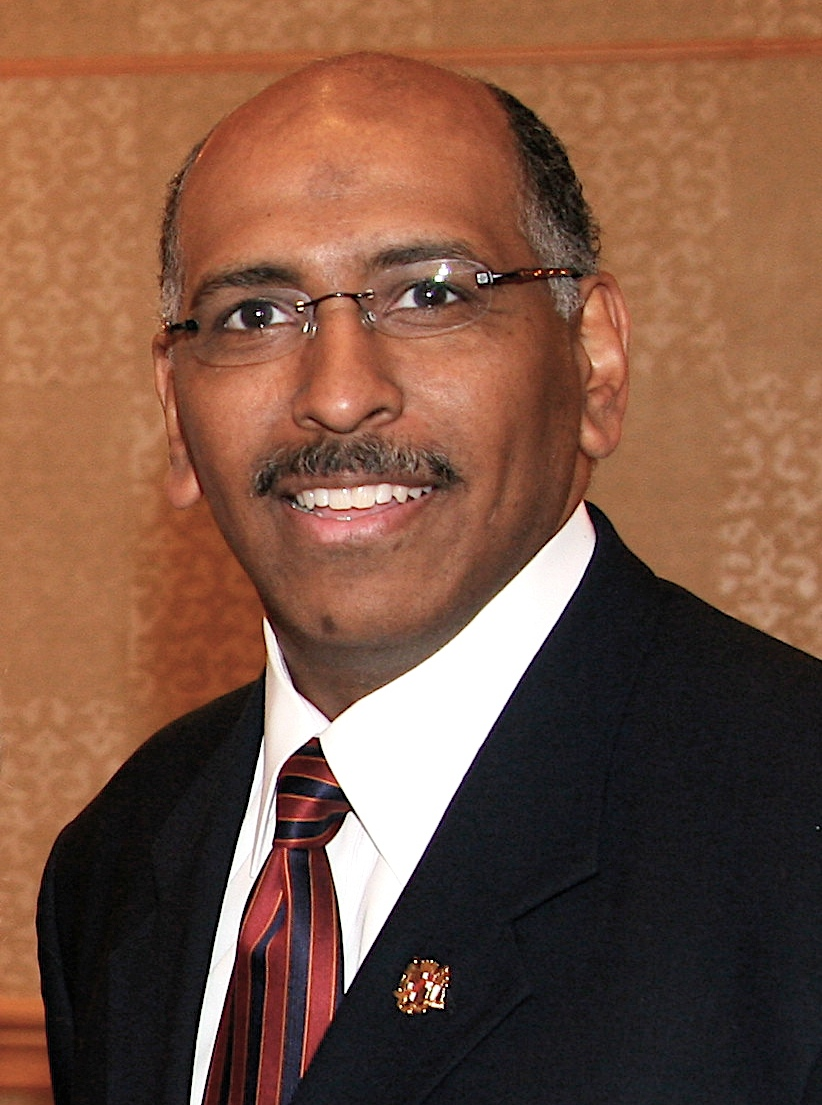
Nominee	Ben Cardin	Michael Steele
Party	Democratic	Republican
Popular vote	965,477	787,182
Percentage	54.2%	44.2%
- County results Cardin: 50–60% 60–70% 70–80% Steele: 50–60% 60–70% 70–80%
U.S. senator before election
Paul Sarbanes
Democratic
Elected U.S. Senator
Ben Cardin
Democratic

Incumbent Democrat Paul Sarbanes, Maryland's longest serving United States senator, decided to retire instead of seeking a sixth term. Democratic nominee Ben Cardin won the open seat.

Kweisi Mfume, a former congressman and NAACP President, was the first to announce for the position, in March 2005. Ben Cardin, then a congressman since 1987, was the only other major candidate until September 2005, when Dennis F. Rasmussen, a former Baltimore County Executive, American University professor Allan Lichtman, and wealthy Potomac businessman Josh Rales entered the contest. Thirteen other candidates subsequently also entered the primary. As of August 2006, Cardin had raised more than $4.8 million and collected endorsements from a number of Democratic politicians, the AFL–CIO, and The Washington Post; Mfume had raised over $1.2 million and collected endorsements from the Maryland State Teachers Association, Progressive Maryland, former Maryland Governor Parris Glendening, the National Organization for Women, and Maryland Congressmen Elijah Cummings and Al Wynn.

Democratic primary
Party	Candidate	Votes	%
Democratic	Benjamin L. Cardin	257,545	43.67%
Democratic	Kweisi Mfume	238,957	40.52%
Democratic	Josh Rales	30,737	5.21%
Democratic	Dennis F. Rasmussen	10,997	1.86%
Democratic	Mike Schaefer	7,773	1.32%
Democratic	Allan Lichtman	6,919	1.17%
Democratic	Theresa C. Scaldaferri	5,081	0.86%
Democratic	James H. Hutchinson	4,949	0.84%
Democratic	David Dickerson	3,950	0.67%
Democratic	A. Robert Kaufman	3,908	0.66%
Democratic	Anthony Jaworski	3,486	0.59%
Democratic	Thomas McCaskill	3,459	0.59
Democratic	George T. English	2,305	0.39%
Democratic	Bob Robinson	2,208	0.37%
Democratic	Lih Young	2,039	0.35%
Democratic	Blaine Taylor	1,848	0.31%
Democratic	Joseph Werner	1,832	0.31
Democratic	Charles Ulysses Smith	1,702	0.29%
Total votes		589,695	100%

Michael S. Steele, Lieutenant Governor and former chairman of the Maryland Republican Party, was expected to win the Republican primary, and the Baltimore Sun wrote the month before that he faced "only nominal opposition". Among a field of nine other candidates, the only Republican receiving significant media coverage was Daniel Vovak.

Republican primary
Party	Candidate	Votes	%
Republican	Michael S. Steele	190,790	86.96%
Republican	John Kimble	6,280	2.86%
Republican	Earl S. Gordon	4,110	1.87%
Republican	Daniel "Wig Man" Vovak	4,063	1.85%
Republican	Thomas J. Hampton	3,946	1.80%
Republican	Corrogan R. Vaughn	2,565	1.17%
Republican	Daniel Muffoletto	2,335	1.06%
Republican	Richard Shawver	2,298	1.05%
Republican	Ray Bly	2,114	0.96%
Republican	Edward Raymond Madej	902	0.41%
Total votes		219,403	100%

This was Maryland's first open Senate seat since 1986, when Senator Barbara Mikulski was first elected.

Kevin Zeese, the nominee for the Green, Populist and Libertarian Parties, was also on the ballot.

Though Steele lost the general election by 10% of the vote, a much wider margin than predicted, his was and remains the best showing for a Republican in a Senate race in Maryland since Charles Mathias, Jr. was re-elected in 1980 with 66% of the vote.

Cardin primarily attacked Steele over his close relations with President Bush, including pictures of Bush and Steele in Cardin's TV ads. Steele focused on low taxes, less government spending, free markets and national security.

Despite polls days before the election showing the race at a 3% margin, Cardin won by more than 10% with a 178,295-vote margin. Steele conceded defeat at 9:02 p.m. EST.

Maryland general election
Party	Candidate	Votes	%	±%
Democratic	Ben Cardin	965,477	54.21%	−9.0%
Republican	Michael S. Steele	787,182	44.19%	+7.5%
Green	Kevin Zeese	27,564	1.55%	n/a
Write-ins		916	0.05%	0%
Majority		178,295	10.02%	
Turnout		1,781,139	100	
Democratic hold		Swing		

== Massachusetts ==
Massachusetts election
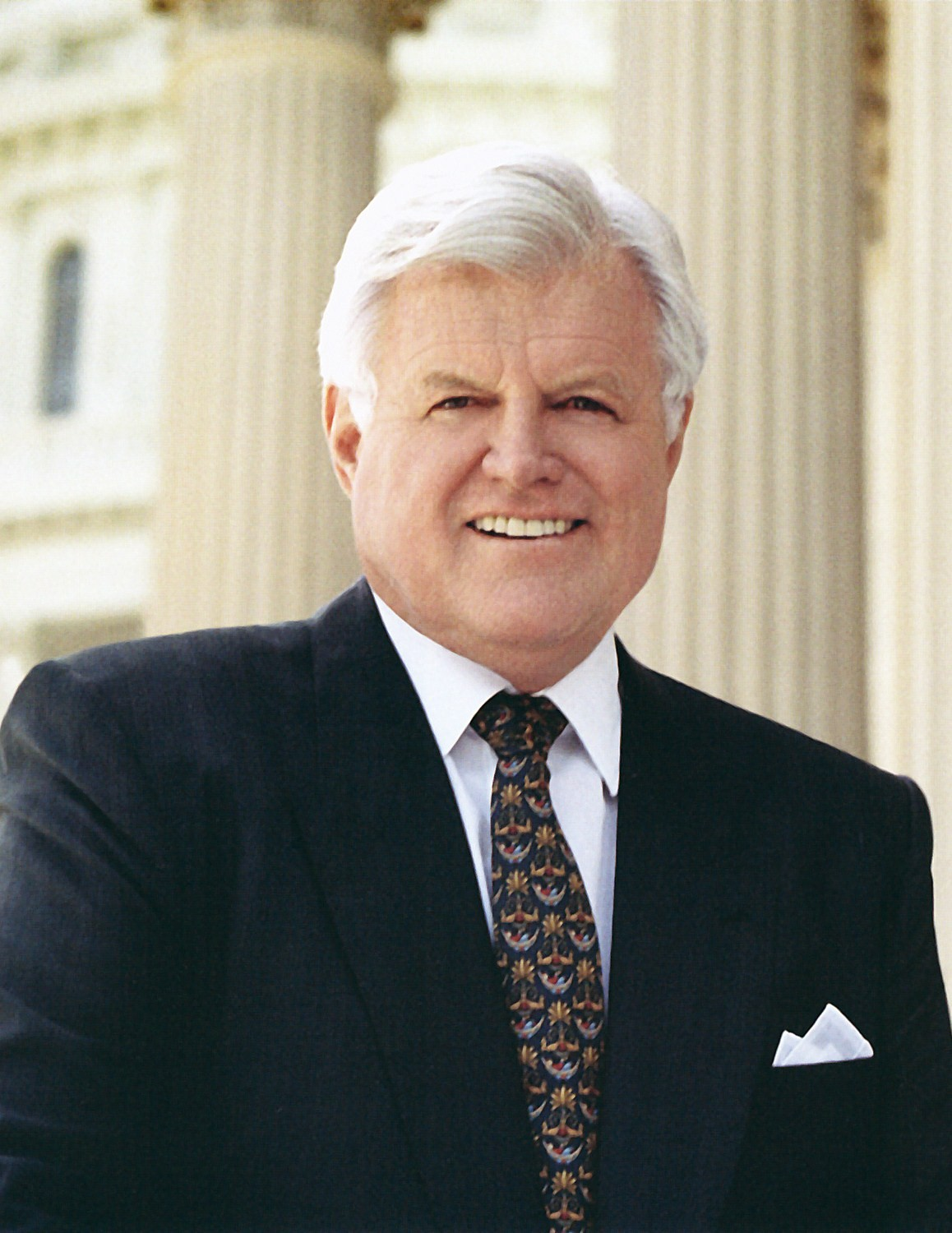

Nominee	Ted Kennedy	Kenneth Chase
Party	Democratic	Republican
Popular vote	1,500,738	661,532
Percentage	69.3%	30.6%

Kennedy
40–50%
50–60%
60–70%
70–80%
80–90%
90-100%
Chase
50–60%
U.S. senator before election
Ted Kennedy
Democratic
Elected U.S. Senator
Ted Kennedy
Democratic

Incumbent Democrat Ted Kennedy won re-election to his ninth (his eighth full) term, beating Republican language school owner and activist Kenneth Chase. This was Kennedy's last election to the Senate.

At the Massachusetts Republican Party Convention Kenneth Chase received the official endorsement with a majority of delegates, though both candidates qualified for the September primary. Former White House Chief-of-Staff Andy Card also received 3 votes.

Republican primary
Party	Candidate	Votes	%
Republican	Kenneth Chase	35,497	50.94%
Republican	Kevin Scott	34,179	49.05%
Total votes		69,676	100.00%

Kennedy captured every county in the state, winning at least 62% in each region.

Massachusetts general election
Party	Candidate	Votes	%	±%
Democratic	Ted Kennedy (Incumbent)	1,500,738	69.30%	−3.4%
Republican	Kenneth Chase	661,532	30.55%	+17.7
Majority		839,206	38.75%	
Turnout		2,165,490		
Democratic hold		Swing	▼20.8	

== Michigan ==
Michigan election
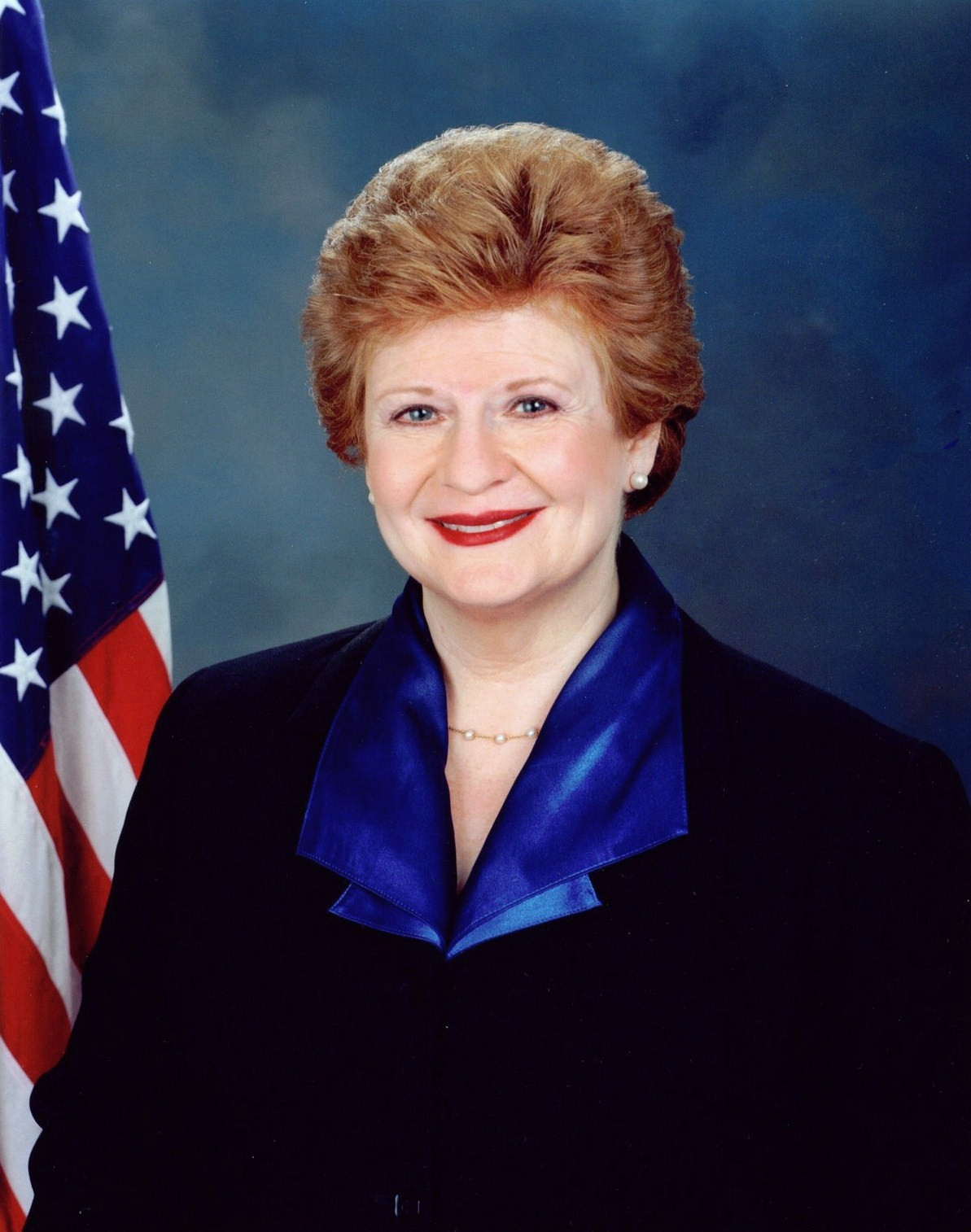

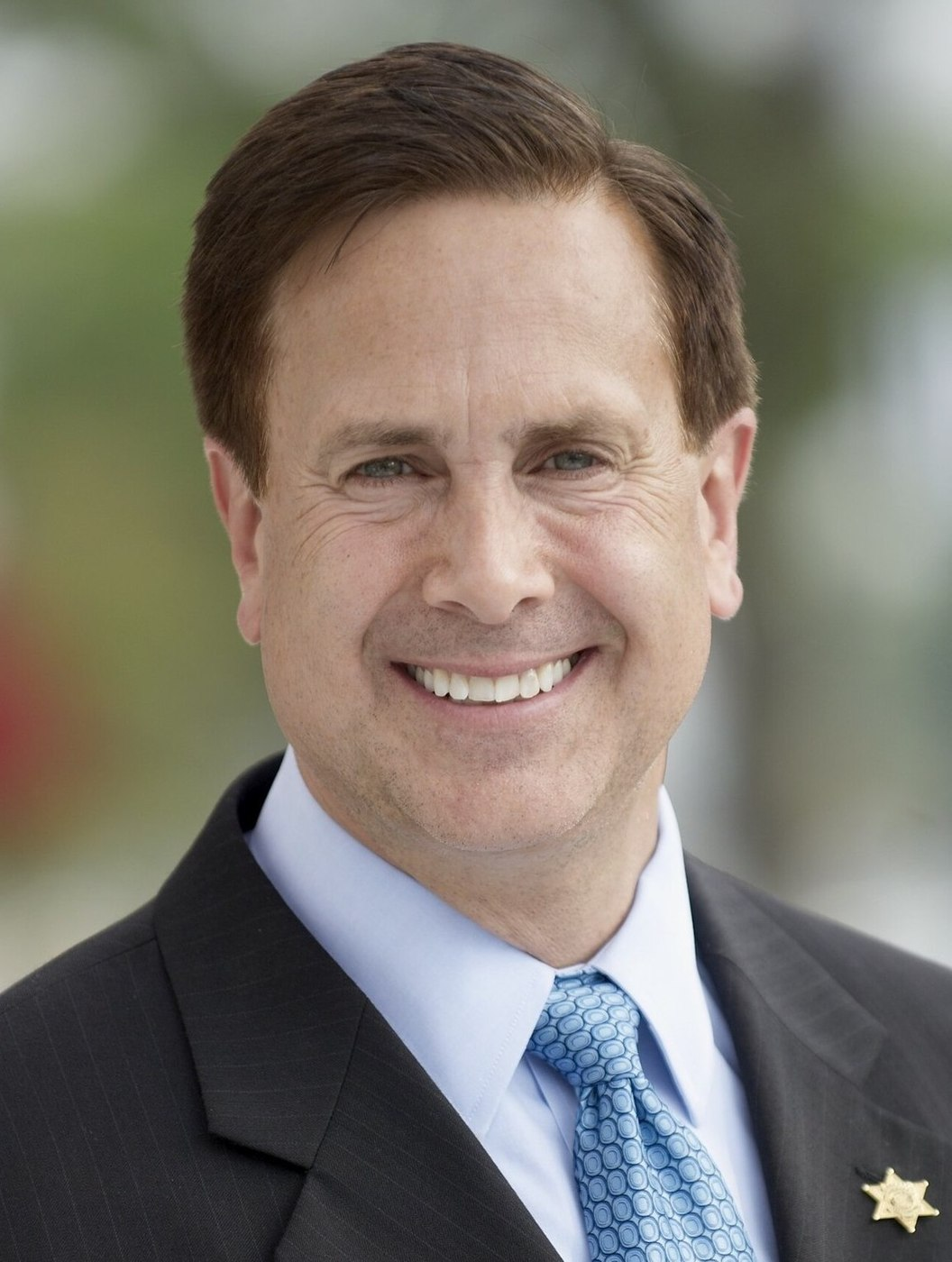
Nominee	Debbie Stabenow	Mike Bouchard
Party	Democratic	Republican
Popular vote	2,151,278	1,559,597
Percentage	56.9%	41.3%
- Stabenow: 40–50% 50–60% 60–70% 70–80% Bouchard: 40–50% 50–60% 60–70%
U.S. senator before election
Debbie Stabenow
Democratic
Elected U.S. Senator
Debbie Stabenow
Democratic

Incumbent Democrat Debbie Stabenow won re-election to a second term, beating Republican Michael Bouchard, Oakland County Sheriff

Economic issues took front-and-center in the campaign, as Michigan's unemployment rate was one of the highest in the nation. In July 2006, unemployment in Michigan stood at approximately 7%, compared with a 4.7% rate nationwide. Pessimism about the state's economic future had left Michigan ranked 49th nationally between 2000 and 2005 in retaining young adults. Since its peak, Detroit had lost over a million people. Bouchard claimed that the incumbent had accomplished nothing, dubbing her "Do-Nothing Debbie."

From a long way out, Stabenow looked like she might be vulnerable. President Bush even came to Michigan to campaign for Bouchard, raising over $1,000,000 for him. However, Bouchard never won a single poll. By October the Republican Party, started taking resources out of Michigan to focus on closer races, essentially ceding the race to Stabenow. Stabenow would go on to win the election easily, capturing nearly 57% of the vote. Stabenow did well throughout Michigan but performed better in heavily populated cities like Detroit, Lansing, Ann Arbor, and Kalamazoo. Bouchard did win Grand Rapids, a typical Republican area. He also won in many rural areas around the state. However, Bouchard failed to put a dent in Stabenow's lead, largely due to her strong performance in heavily populated areas. Bouchard conceded to Stabenow at 9:58 p.m. EST.

Michigan general election
Party	Candidate	Votes	%	±%
Democratic	Debbie Stabenow (Incumbent)	2,151,278	56.9%	+7.4%
Republican	Michael Bouchard	1,559,597	41.3%	−6.6%
Libertarian	Leonard Schwartz	27,012	0.7%	0%
Green	David Sole	23,890	0.6%	−0.3%
Constitution	Dennis FitzSimons	18,341	0.5%	+0.2%
Majority		591,681	15.6%	
Turnout		3,780,142		
Democratic hold		Swing	7%	

== Minnesota ==
Minnesota election
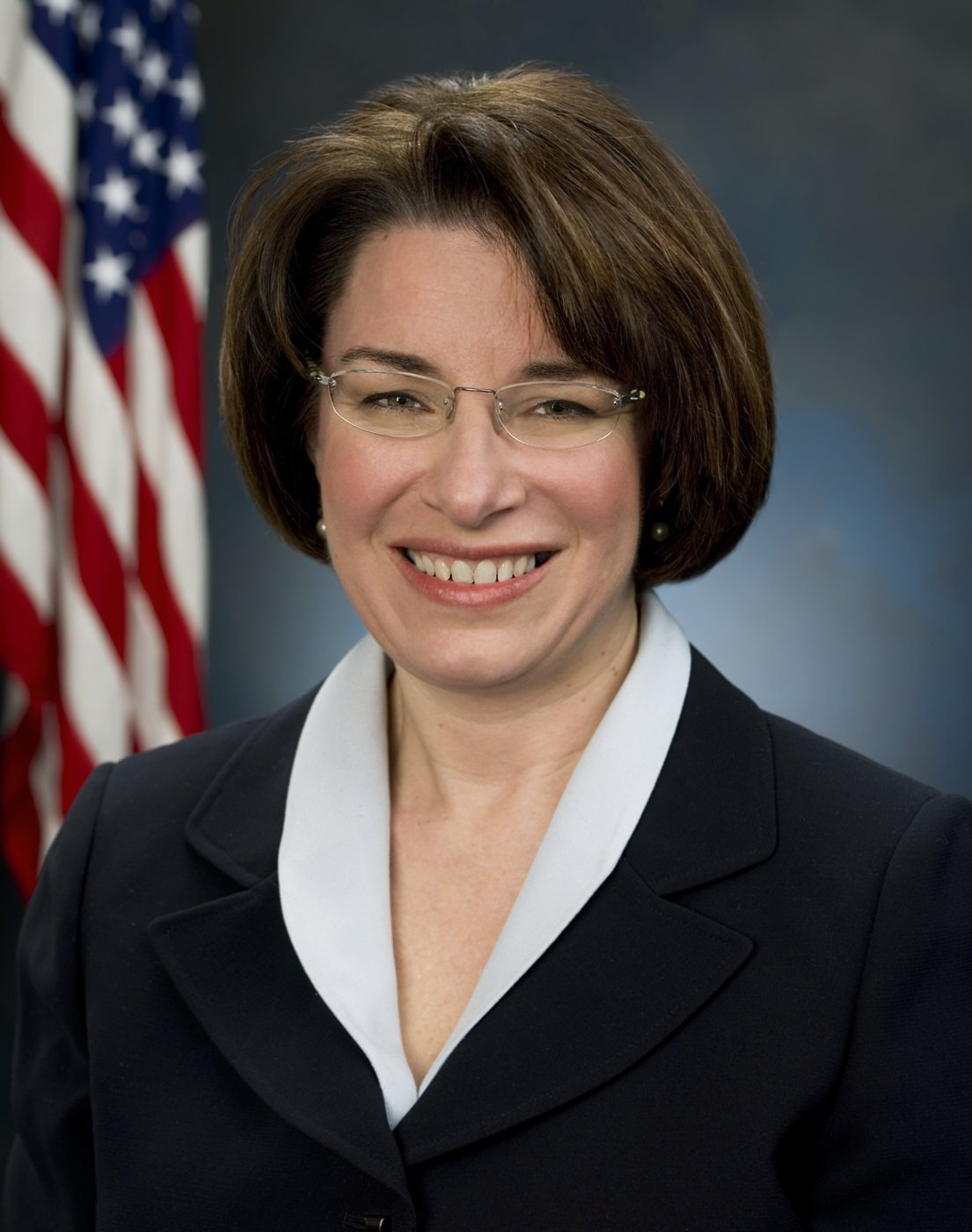

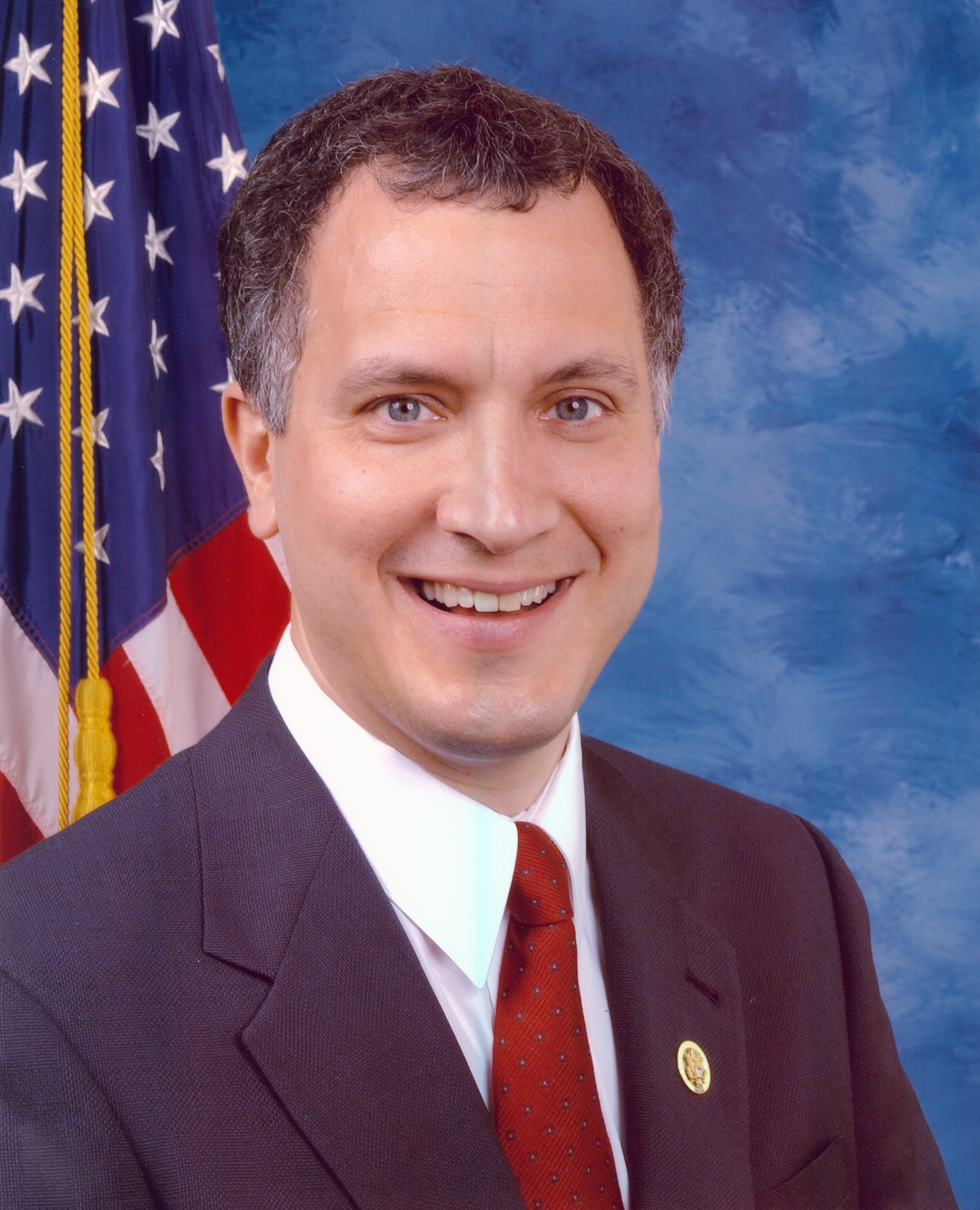
Nominee	Amy Klobuchar	Mark Kennedy
Party	Democratic (DFL)	Republican
Popular vote	1,278,849	835,653
Percentage	58.1%	37.9%
- Klobuchar: 40–50% 50–60% 60–70% 70–80% Kennedy: 40–50% 50–60%
U.S. senator before election
Mark Dayton
Democratic (DFL)
Elected U.S. Senator
Amy Klobuchar
Democratic (DFL)

Incumbent DFL senator Mark Dayton decided in February 2005 that he would retire instead of seeking a second term. The primary elections took place on September 12, 2006. DFL nominee Amy Klobuchar won the open seat over Mark Kennedy (R), U.S. Congressman.

Klobuchar gained the early endorsement of the majority of DFL state legislators in Minnesota.

Minnesota Democratic–Farmer–Labor primary
Party	Candidate	Votes	%
Democratic (DFL)	Amy Klobuchar	294,671	92.51%
Democratic (DFL)	Darryl Stanton	23,872	7.49%
Total votes		318,543	100.00%

Republican primary
Party	Candidate	Votes	%
Republican	Mark Kennedy	147,091	90.21%
Republican	John Uldrich	10,025	6.15%
Republican	Harold Shudlick	5,941	3.64%
Total votes		163,057	100.00%

Independence primary
Party	Candidate	Votes	%
Independence	Robert Fitzgerald	5,520	51.61%
Independence	Miles W. Collins	2,600	24.31%
Independence	Stephen Williams	2,575	24.08%
Total votes		10,695	100.00%

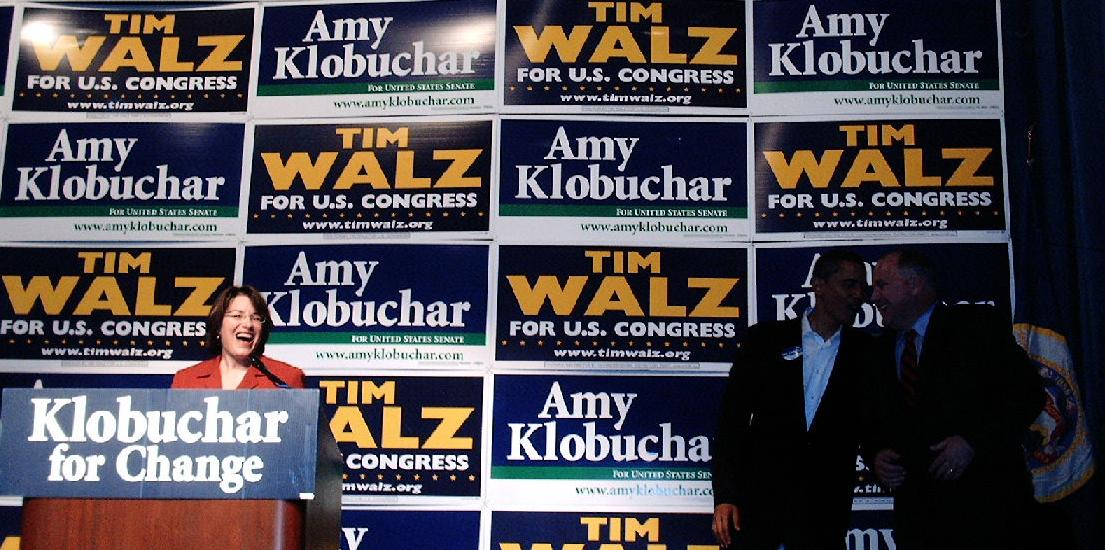
Klobuchar with Barack Obama and Tim Walz.

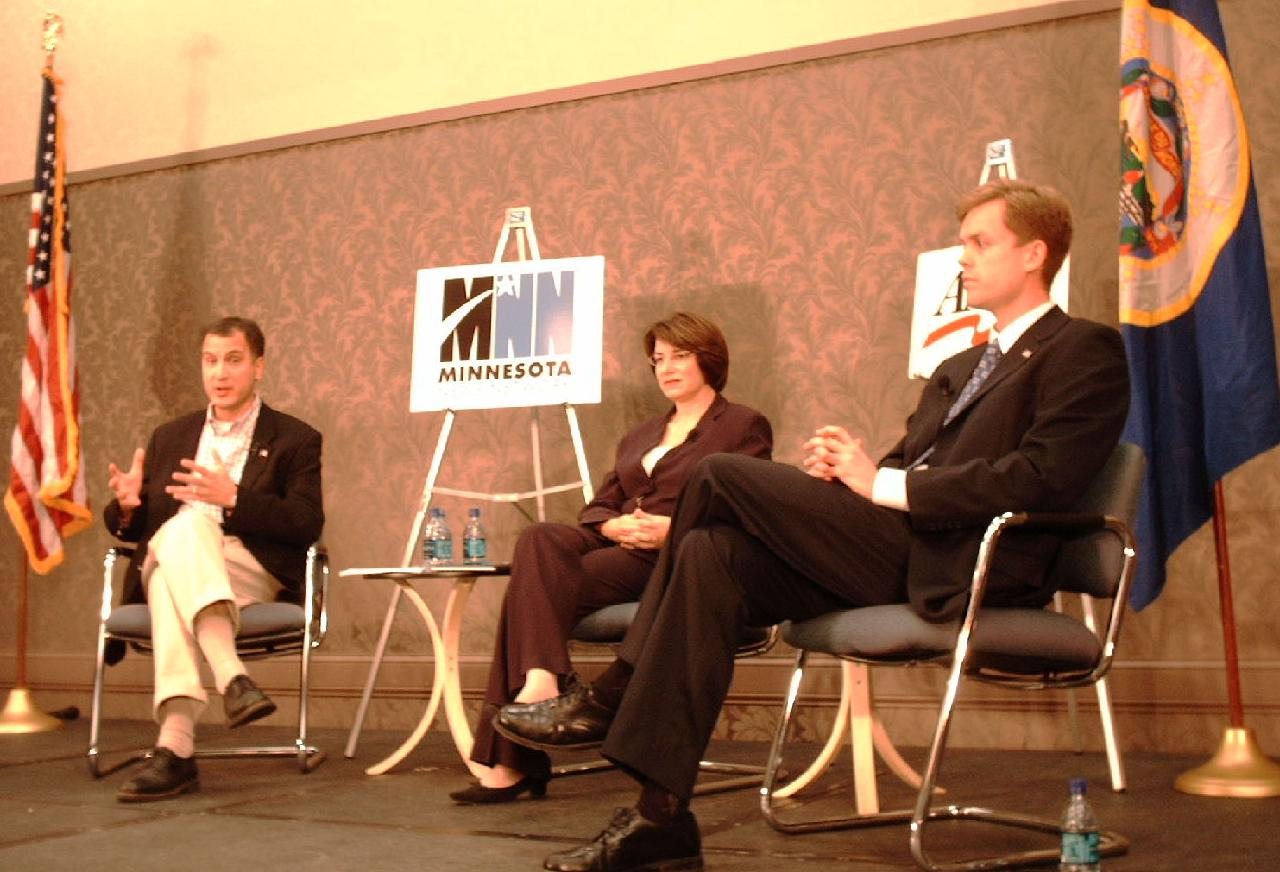
Major party candidates: Kennedy, Klobuchar, and Fitzgerald.

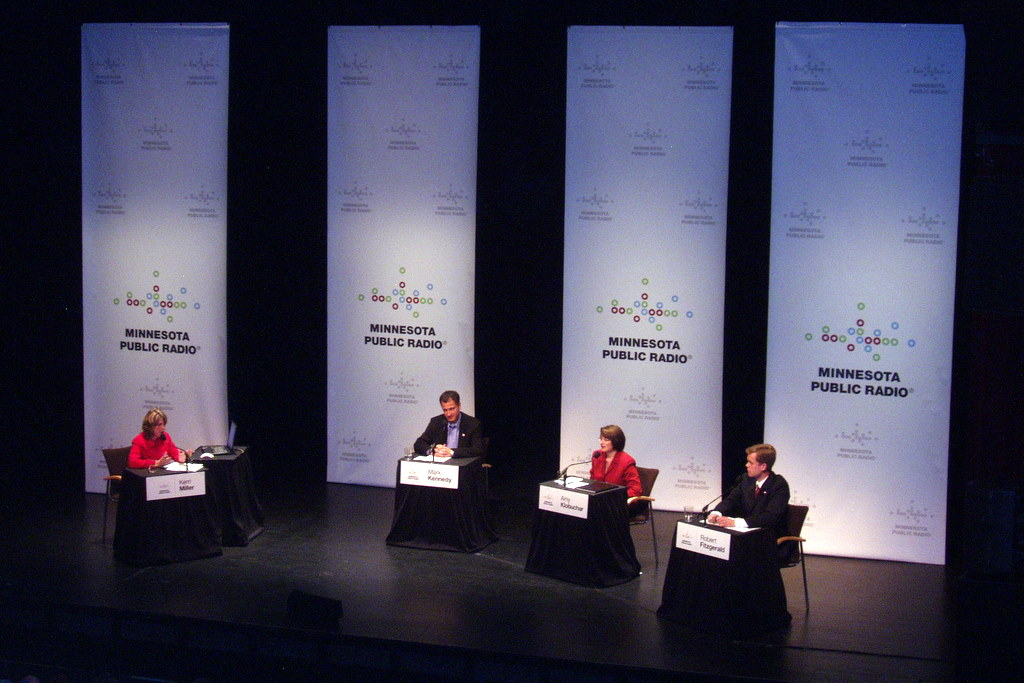
Candidates Mark Kennedy, Amy Klobuchar, and Robert Fitzgerald debate on November 5, 2006.

Kennedy's routine support of President George W. Bush in House votes was a central issue for Democrats in the campaign. In June 2006, allegations were made that many references to and photos of Bush had been removed from Kennedy's official U.S. House website; in rebuttal, Republicans said that there were 72 references to Bush on the website and that the changes noted by critics had been made some time ago, as part of the normal updating process. Ben Powers was the only ballot-qualified candidate not to be invited to appear on Minnesota Public Television's Almanac program, despite Mr. Powers's offer to fill the space left unfilled by Ms. Klobuchar's decision not to appear with Mr. Kennedy and Mr. Fitzgerald on the program. Green candidate Michael Cavlan appeared on the program twice during the 2006 campaign as a special guest.

Minnesota general election
Party	Candidate	Votes	%	±%
Democratic (DFL)	Amy Jean Klobuchar	1,278,849	58.06%	+9.23%
Republican	Mark Kennedy	835,653	37.94%	−5.35%
Independence	Robert Fitzgerald	71,194	3.23%	−2.58%
Green	Michael Cavlan	10,714	0.49%	n/a
Constitution	Ben Powers	5,408	0.25%	+0.15%
Write-ins		954		
Majority		443,196	20.2%	
Turnout		2,202,772	70.64%	
Democratic (DFL) hold		Swing		

== Mississippi ==
Mississippi election

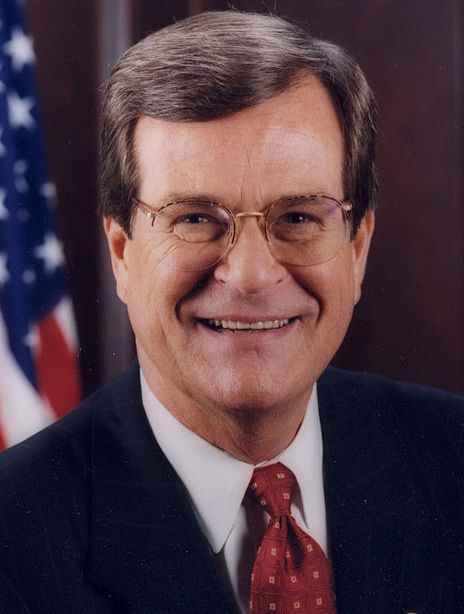

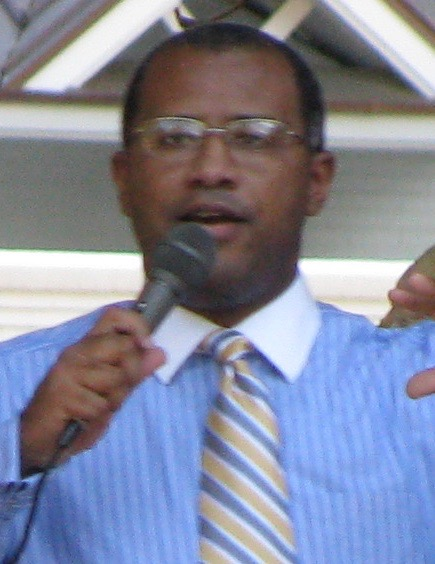
Nominee	Trent Lott	Erik R. Fleming
Party	Republican	Democratic
Popular vote	388,399	213,000
Percentage	63.6%	34.9%
- County results Lott: 40–50% 50–60% 60–70% 70–80% 80–90% Fleming: 40–50% 50–60% 60–70% 70–80%
U.S. senator before election
Trent Lott
Republican
Elected U.S. Senator
Trent Lott
Republican

Incumbent Republican Trent Lott won re-election to a fourth term.

Democratic primary
Party	Candidate	Votes	%
Democratic	Erik R. Fleming	46,185	44.07%
Democratic	Bill Bowlin	23,175	22.11%
Democratic	James O'Keefe	20,815	19.86%
Democratic	Catherine Starr	14,629	13.96%
Total votes		104,804	100%

Democratic primary runoff results
Party	Candidate	Votes	%
Democratic	Erik R. Fleming	19,477	64.99%
Democratic	Bill Bowlin	10,490	35.01%
Total votes		29,967	100%

Lott ran for re-election without facing any opposition in his party's primary. While it had been speculated that Lott might retire after his home was destroyed in Hurricane Katrina, he instead chose to run for re-election. Fleming is an African American, which represents 37% of the state's population. However, no African American has ever been elected to statewide office. The last black U.S. Senator was Hiram Revels, who was appointed and took office in 1870. Fleming got little help from the DSCC, which only donated $15,000 to his campaign.

Mississippi general election
Party	Candidate	Votes	%	±%
Republican	Trent Lott (Incumbent)	388,399	63.58%	
Democratic	Erik R. Fleming	213,000	34.87%	
Libertarian	Harold Taylor	9,522	1.56%	
Majority		175,399	28.71%	
Turnout		591,178		
Republican hold		Swing		

== Missouri ==
Missouri election
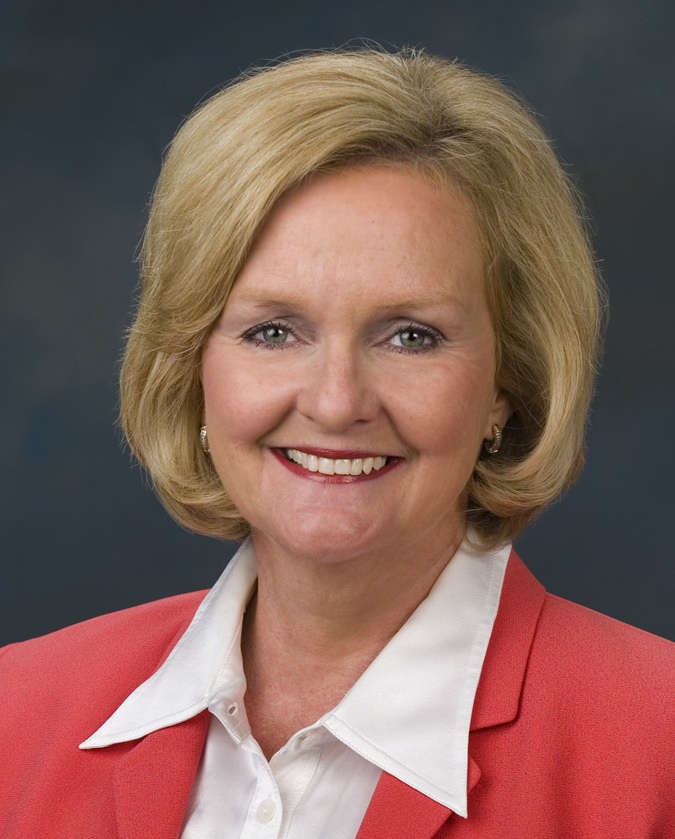

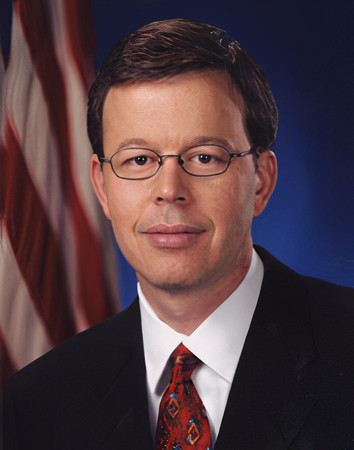
Nominee	Claire McCaskill	Jim Talent
Party	Democratic	Republican
Popular vote	1,055,255	1,006,941
Percentage	49.6%	47.3%
- County results McCaskill: 40–50% 50–60% 60–70% 70–80% Talent: 40–50% 50–60% 60–70% 70–80%
U.S. senator before election
Jim Talent
Republican
Elected U.S. Senator
Claire McCaskill
Democratic

Incumbent Republican Jim Talent was elected in a special election in 2002 when he narrowly defeated incumbent Democrat Jean Carnahan. Carnahan had been appointed to the Senate seat following the posthumous election of her husband Mel Carnahan, who died in a plane crash shortly before the 2000 election. Talent was running for a full term, his Democratic opponent was Missouri State Auditor Claire McCaskill. Early on the morning of November 8, Talent conceded defeat to McCaskill, having faced considerable political headwinds. Talent lost the election with 47% of the vote, to 50% of the vote for McCaskill.

The election was always expected to be very close, which seems fitting for a seat that changed hands twice, both by very narrow margins, within six years. In 2000, Democratic Missouri Governor Mel Carnahan, despite his death in a plane crash three weeks before the election, narrowly defeated incumbent Republican Senator John Ashcroft 50% to 48%. Two years later in a special election held for the seat, incumbent Senator Jean Carnahan lost an even closer election to former Congressman Talent, 50% to 49%.

Missouri was seen as the nation's bellwether state throughout the 20th century: It had voted for the winner of every presidential election since 1900, except for 1956 (when the state narrowly favored Adlai Stevenson over Dwight D. Eisenhower). Missouri's bellwether status was due to the fact that it not only voted for the electoral victor, but that its returns usually mirrored national returns.

The state itself is a geographically central state, bordered by both the edges of Southern and Midwestern regions. In statewide contests for much of the 20th century, Missouri favored the Democratic Party. In recent elections, the Republican Party (GOP) has emerged in statewide contests. The election of 2004 was an important one; as George W. Bush was re-elected he carried Missouri. But this time his margin in the state was greater than it was nationwide. Bush won the Presidency 51% to 48%, he carried Missouri 53% to 46%. This trend had begun in 2000, when Bush lost the national popular vote to Al Gore 47% to 48% but still won Missouri, 50% to 47%. Bush's victory also saw Republicans triumph in several statewide contests; Senator Kit Bond was re-elected by a decisive 56% to 43% margin and Matt Blunt won the election for Governor, narrowly defeating state auditor Claire McCaskill 51% to 48%. The GOP also captured control of the state legislature for the first time in eighty years.

Talent, anticipating a tough re-election battle and attempting to dissuade challengers, had accumulated a large campaign fund. For most of 2005, he had no opposition. State Senator Chuck Graham had briefly entered the race early in the year, but withdrew soon after. However, on August 30, 2005, Democrat Claire McCaskill announced her intention to run for Talent's Senate seat.

McCaskill started with a large financial disadvantage, but she was also an experienced candidate with high name recognition. McCaskill had run two successful campaigns for state auditor. She was also a candidate for governor in 2004, when she defeated the incumbent Democratic Governor Bob Holden in the primary election but lost with 48% of the vote in the general election.

Both Talent and McCaskill faced unknowns in their respective primaries on August 8, 2006, and defeated them soundly.

The Missouri contest was seen as vitally important to control of the United States Senate; as a toss-up election between two strong candidates, the race was expected to attract a lot of interest as well as money spent on ads and turning out supporters. If Talent won, then a Democratic takeover of the U.S. Senate depended upon victories in Tennessee, where the Republican Bob Corker won, and Virginia, where Democrat Jim Webb won; the Democrats needed to win six seats to take control of the chamber with 51 seats. To do this, they would need to retain their 19 incumbent seats, win the four Republican-held seats of Montana, Ohio, Rhode Island, and Pennsylvania (where Democratic chances seemed above 50%, and Democrats won all 4.) and two of the following three "toss-up" races: Missouri, Tennessee and Virginia.

It is believed that statewide ballot issues drove the November 2006 vote. Talent was on the opposite of the majority of voters in this poll on just about every issue: 66% of Missouri voters favored raising the minimum wage to $6.50 an hour; 62% of Missouri voters favored raising taxes to replace Medicaid funding cut by the current Republican Governor, Matt Blunt; 54% opposed a law that would require all Missourians to show a photo ID before they vote; 58% favored campaign donation limitations; and 66% favored restoring Medicaid coverage to about 90,000 Missourians who lost coverage when Blunt and the Republican legislature tightened eligibility requirements. Perhaps most importantly, 62% polled favored a ballot proposal that would allow all types of embryonic stem cell research allowed under federal law - a measure Talent had recently announced that he was against. The amendment would go on to pass narrowly, with 51% voting in favor of the measure.

On election night the race was, as expected, too close to call. With 85% of the vote in and with still no call, McCaskill claimed victory. At the time McCaskill declared victory, she was ahead by a vote margin of 867,683 to Talent's 842,251 votes; in percentage terms, with 85% of the vote in, McCaskill led Talent, 49% to 48%. Finally, at 11:38 p.m. Central Time the Associated Press called McCaskill as the winner. St. Louis County, adjacent to St. Louis, and Jackson County, home of Kansas City, are probably what pushed McCaskill over the finish line.

Missouri general election
Party	Candidate	Votes	%	±%
Democratic	Claire McCaskill	1,055,255	49.6%	+0.9%
Republican	Jim Talent (Incumbent)	1,006,941	47.3%	−2.5%
Libertarian	Frank Gilmour	47,792	2.2%	+1.2%
Progressive	Lydia Lewis	18,383	0.9%	n/a
Write-ins		88	0.0%	n/a
Plurality		48,314	2.3%	
Turnout		2,128,459		
Democratic gain from Republican		Swing		

== Montana ==
Montana election
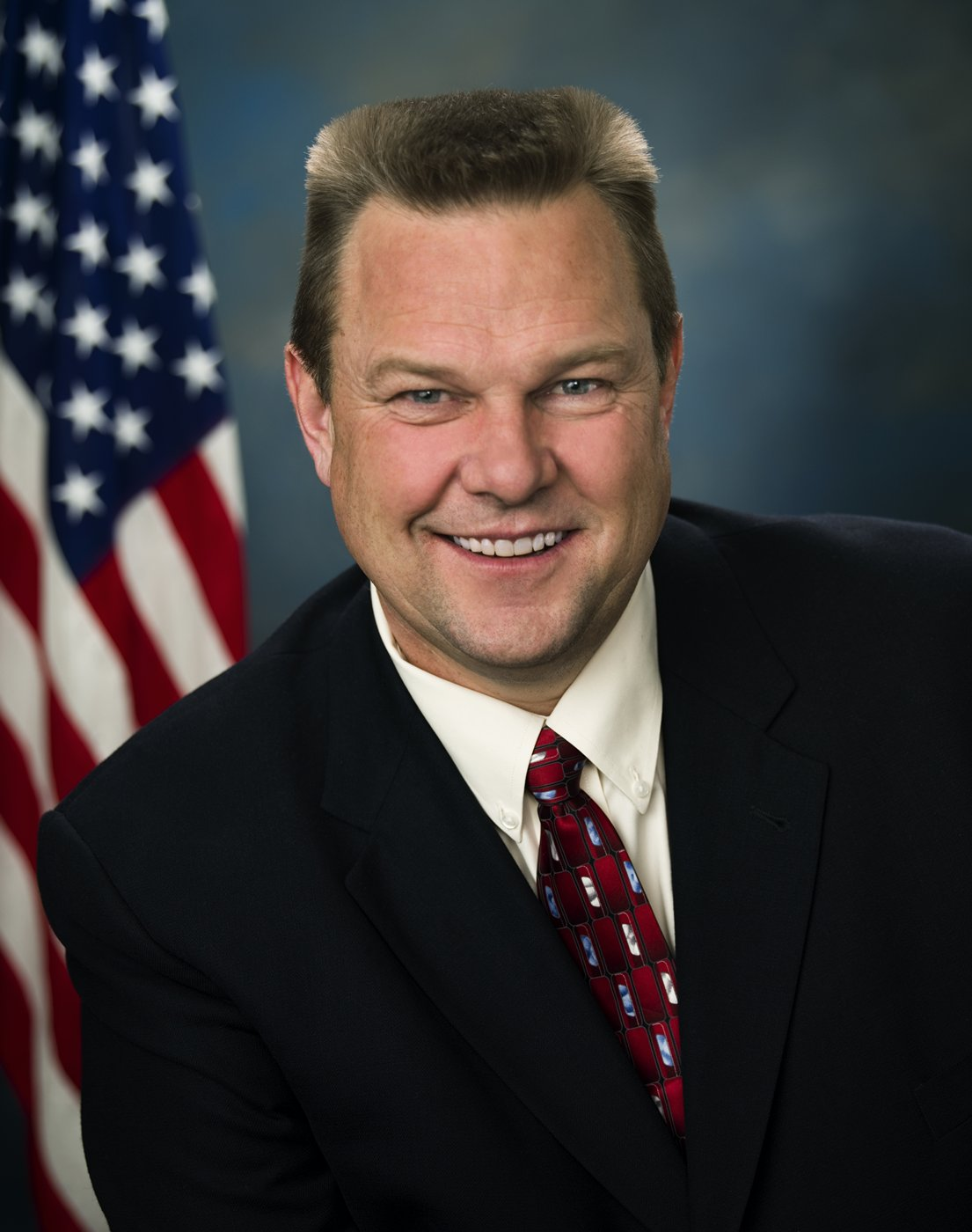

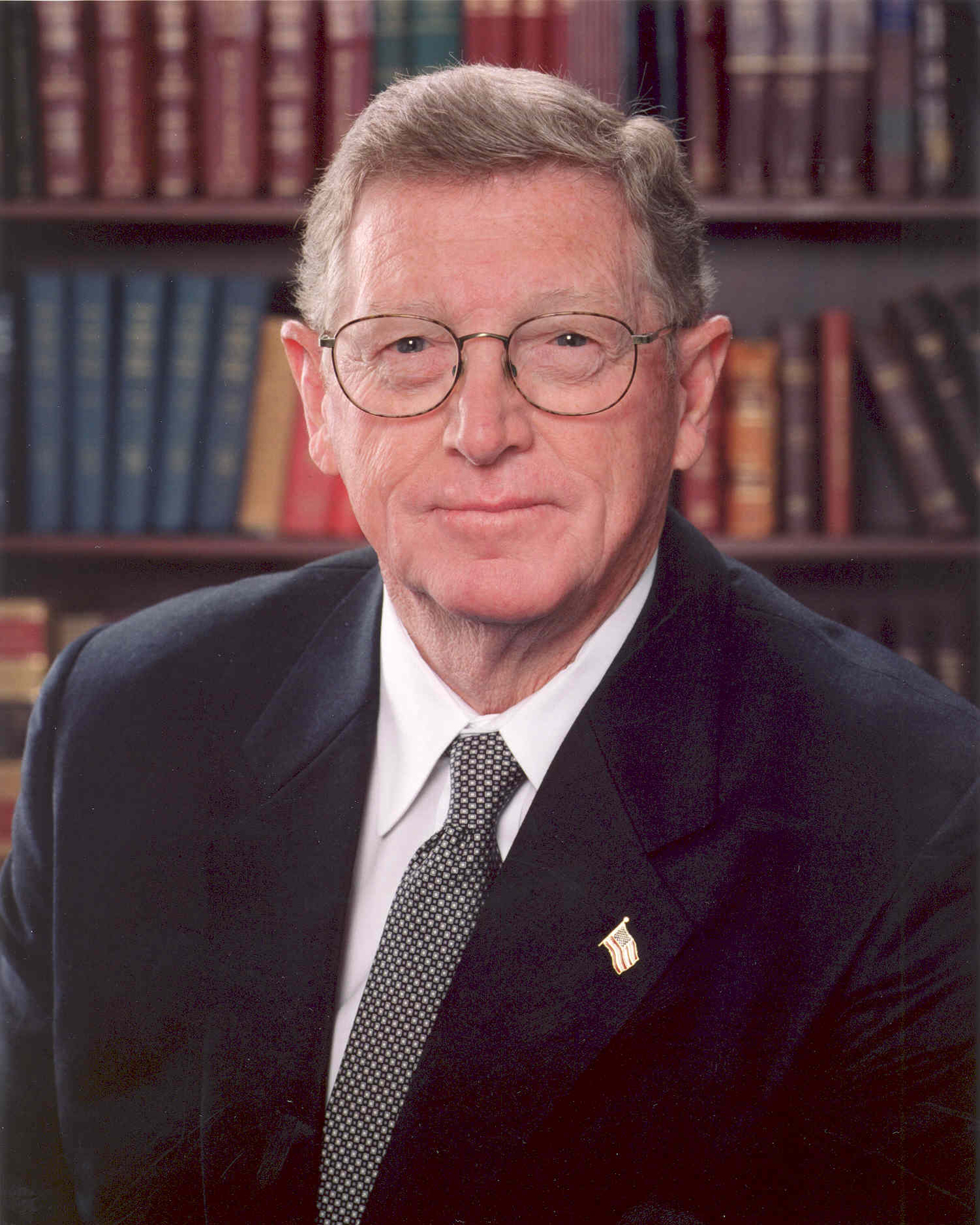
Nominee	Jon Tester	Conrad Burns
Party	Democratic	Republican
Popular vote	199,845	196,283
Percentage	49.16%	48.29%
- County results Tester: 40–50% 50–60% 60–70% 70–80% Burns: 50–60% 60–70% 70–80% 80–90%
U.S. senator before election
Conrad Burns
Republican
Elected U.S. Senator
Jon Tester
Democratic

Incumbent Republican Conrad Burns was running for re-election to a fourth term but was defeated by Democrat Jon Tester, President of the Montana State Senate, by a margin of 0.87%, or 3,562 votes out of 406,505 votes.

Burns was first elected as a United States senator from Montana in 1988, when he defeated Democratic incumbent John Melcher in a close race, 51% to 48%. Burns was re-elected 62.4% to 37.6%, over Jack Mudd in the Republican Revolution year of 1994. In 2000, Burns faced the well-financed Brian Schweitzer whom he beat 50.6% to 47.2%.

In 2000, George W. Bush carried Montana 58% to 33% in the race for president, but Burns won by 3.4%. Since the direct election of Senators began in 1913, Burns is only the second Republican Montana has elected to the U.S. Senate. Also, for thirty-two straight years, 1952 to 1984, Montana elected only Democratic Senators.

Burns's involvement in the Jack Abramoff scandal made him vulnerable. A SurveyUSA poll released in March 2006 found that 38% of Montanans approved of him, while 52% disapproved of him. Polls against leading Democratic candidates had him below his challengers.

On May 31, 2006, Richards, citing the closeness of the race, and his own position (third) in the polls, withdrew from the race, and threw his support to Tester. Morrison started off strong in the race for the Democratic nomination for Senator, collecting $1.05 million as of the start of 2006, including $409,241 in the last three months of 2005. but Morrison's advantages in fundraising and name identification did not translate into a lead in the polls. Later, the race was called a "deadlock," but Tester continued to gather momentum.

Democratic primary
Party	Candidate	Votes	%
Democratic	Jon Tester	65,757	60.77%
Democratic	John Morrison	38,394	35.48%
Democratic	Paul Richards	1,636	1.51%
Democratic	Robert Candee	1,471	1.36%
Democratic	Kenneth Marcure	940	0.87%
Total votes		108,198	100.00%

Republican primary
Party	Candidate	Votes	%
Republican	Conrad Burns (Incumbent)	70,434	72.26%
Republican	Bob Keenan	21,754	22.32%
Republican	Bob Kelleher	4,082	4.19%
Republican	Daniel Loyd Neste Huffman	1,203	1.23%
Total votes		97,473	100.00%

The race was expected to be close, due to Burns's previous narrow winning margins and recent political scandal involving him personally; Republican incumbents everywhere were facing more challenging races in 2006 due to the waning popularity of Congress and the leadership of President George W. Bush. In July 2006, the Rasmussen report viewed Burns as the "second most vulnerable Senator seeking re-election this year (Pennsylvania's Rick Santorum was still the most vulnerable)."

Senator Conrad Burns of Montana faced a strong challenge from Brian Schweitzer in 2000, being re-elected by 3.4% in a state that went for Bush twice by margins of over 20%. This, combined with the increasing strength of the state Democratic party and accusations of ethical issues related to the Jack Abramoff scandal, made this a highly competitive race.

On July 27, Burns was forced to apologize after he confronted out of state firefighters who were preparing to leave Montana after helping contain a summer forest fire and directly questioned their competence and skill; Burns was strongly criticized.

On August 31, in a letter faxed to the office of Montana governor Brian Schweitzer, Burns urged the governor, a Democrat, to declare a fire state of emergency and activate the Montana Army National Guard for firefighting. Schweitzer had already declared such a state of emergency on July 11 — thus, activating the Montana Army National Guard. He issued a second declaration on August 11. A Burns spokesman said the senator was "pretty sure" Schweitzer had already issued such a disaster declaration, but just wanted to make sure. "The genesis of the letter was just to make sure that all the bases were covered," Pendleton said. "This is not a political football. It's just a cover-the-bases letter and certainly casts no aspersions on the governor."

Montana general election
Party	Candidate	Votes	%	±%
Democratic	Jon Tester	199,845	49.16%	+1.92%
Republican	Conrad Burns (incumbent)	196,283	48.29%	−2.27%
Libertarian	Stan Jones	10,377	2.55%	
Majority		3,562	0.88%	−2.44%
Turnout		406,505		
Democratic gain from Republican		Swing		

Due to errors with polling machines the Montana count was delayed well into Wednesday November 8. The race was too close to call throughout the night and many pundits predicted the need for a recount. After a very close election, on November 9, incumbent Conrad Burns conceded defeat.

Just before 11:00 am (MST) on November 8, Jon Tester was declared Senator-elect for Montana in USA Today. At 2:27 pm EST on November 8, CNN projected that Jon Tester would win the race.

Burns conceded the race on November 9, and congratulated Tester on his victory.

The race was the closest Senate election of 2006 in terms of absolute vote difference; the closest race by percentage difference was the Virginia senate election.

== Nebraska ==
Nebraska election
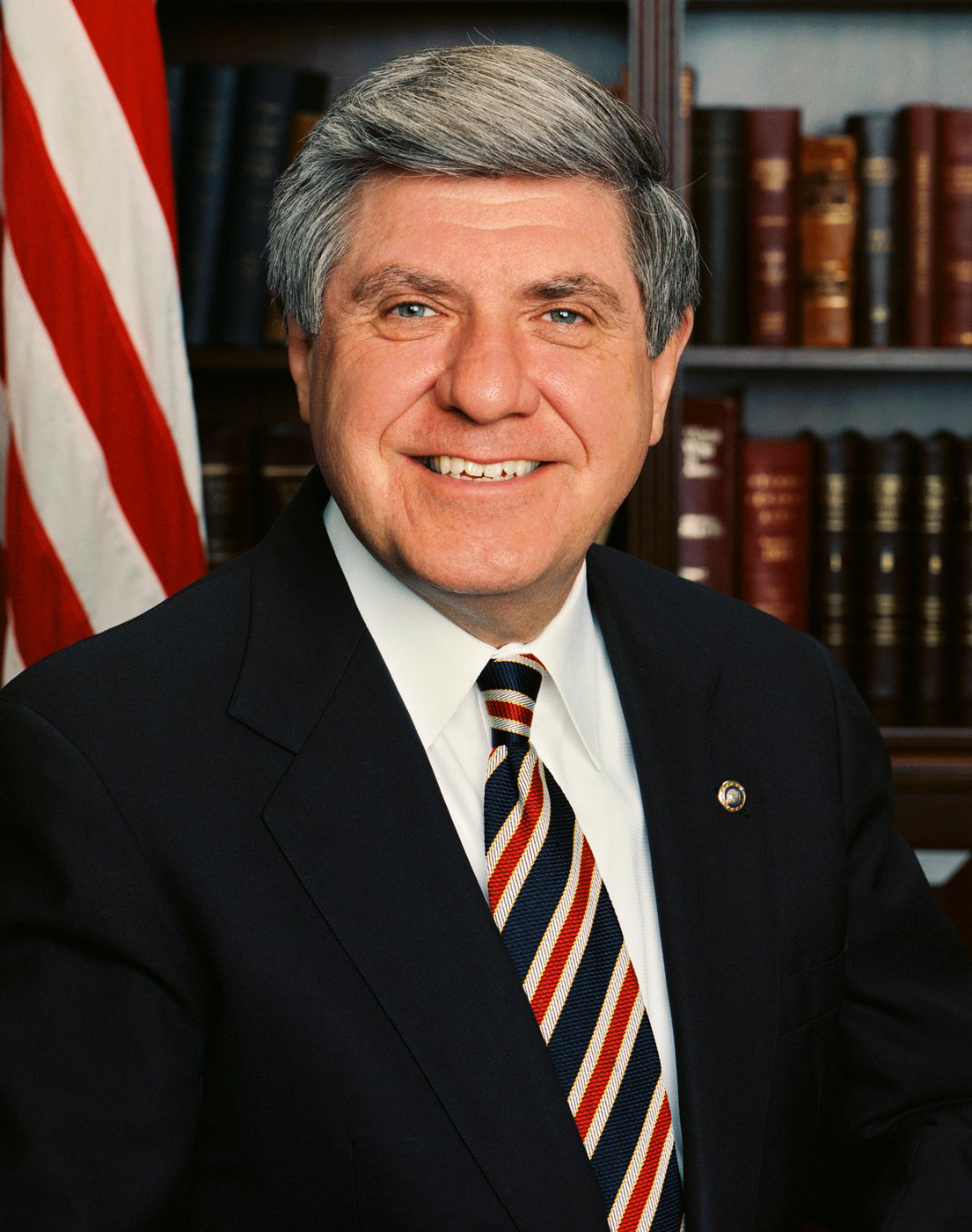

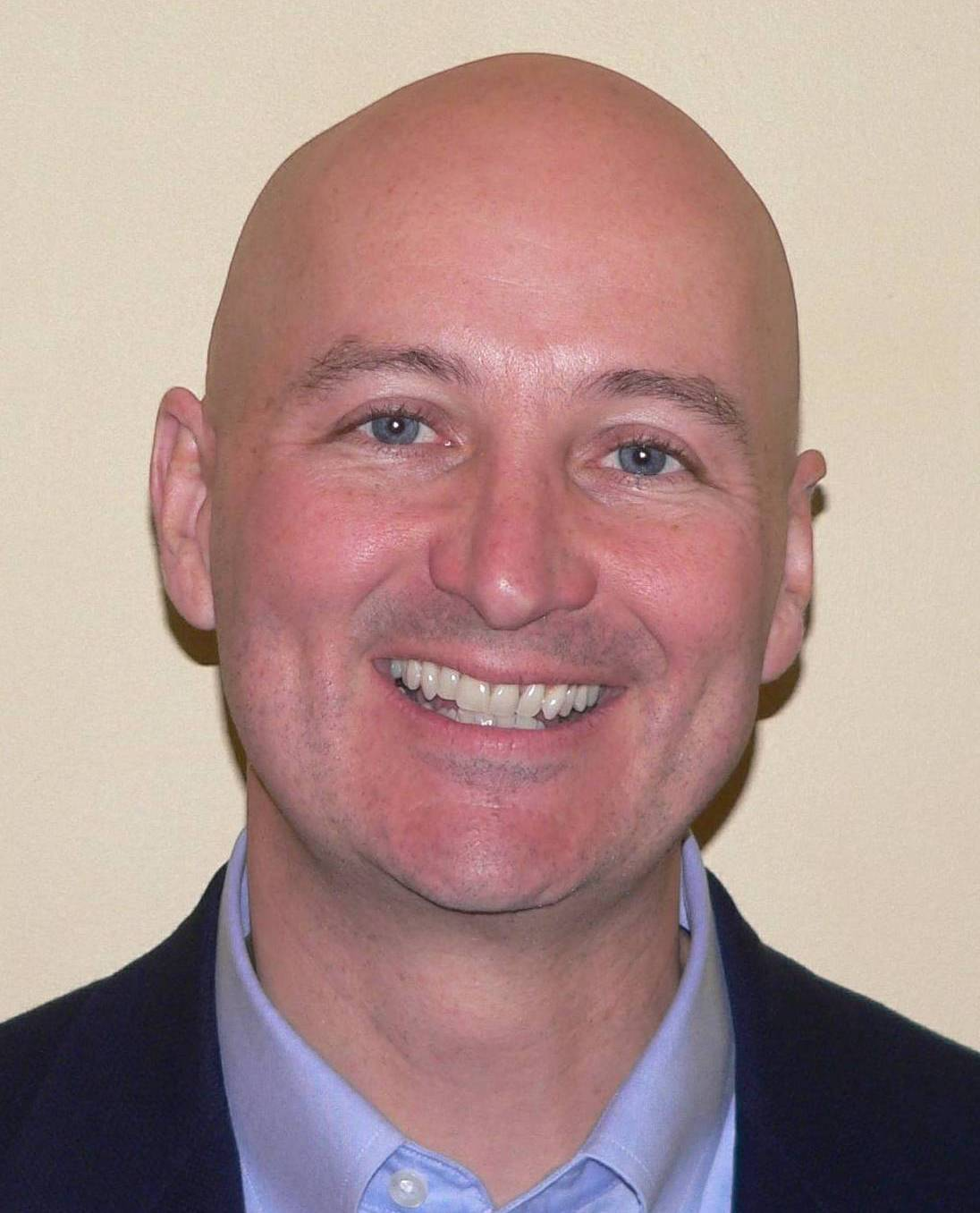
Nominee	Ben Nelson	Pete Ricketts
Party	Democratic	Republican
Popular vote	378,388	213,928
Percentage	63.9%	36.1%
- Nelson: 50–60% 60–70% 70–80% Ricketts: 50–60%
U.S. senator before election
Ben Nelson
Democratic
Elected U.S. Senator
Ben Nelson
Democratic

Incumbent Democrat Ben Nelson won re-election to a second term. As of 2026, this is the last Senate election in Nebraska won by a Democrat.

Democratic primary
Party	Candidate	Votes	%
Democratic	Ben Nelson (Incumbent)	92,501	100.00%
Total votes		92,501	100.00%

Republican Pete Ricketts, former COO of TD Ameritrade and future Governor of Nebraska financed his own campaign. His opponents could not raise enough money to keep up. Kramer raised $330,000 and Stenberg raised $246,000 in 2005.

Republican primary
Party	Candidate	Votes	%
Republican	Pete Ricketts	129,643	48.14%
Republican	Don Stenberg	96,496	35.83%
Republican	David J. Kramer	43,185	16.03%
Total votes		269,324	100.00%

The primary election was held May 9, 2006. Pete Ricketts won the Republican nomination with 48% of the vote. Ben Nelson was unopposed for the Democratic nomination. Nelson was elected in 2000 by a margin of 51% to 49% after serving as the state's governor for two terms. Nelson, considered the most conservative Democrat in the Senate, was the lone Democrat in Nebraska's Congressional delegation. This election was one of the most expensive in Nebraska history. In 2005, Ben Nelson raised $3.9 million for his re-election campaign. Pete Ricketts contributed $14.35 million of his own money to his campaign; he raised an additional $485,000 in contributions. The race also attracted national attention and generated several high-level campaign appearances. President George W. Bush appeared at a rally for Ricketts on November 5, 2006, in Grand Island, while then-U.S. Senator Barack Obama appeared at a fundraiser for Nelson and other Nebraska Democrats on May 5, 2006, in Omaha. However, he won re-election by a wide margin.

Nebraska general election
Party	Candidate	Votes	%	±%
Democratic	Ben Nelson (incumbent)	378,388	63.88%	+12.88%
Republican	Pete Ricketts	213,928	36.12%	−12.70%
Majority		164,460	27.77%	+25.58%
Turnout		590,961		
Democratic hold		Swing		

== Nevada ==
Nevada election
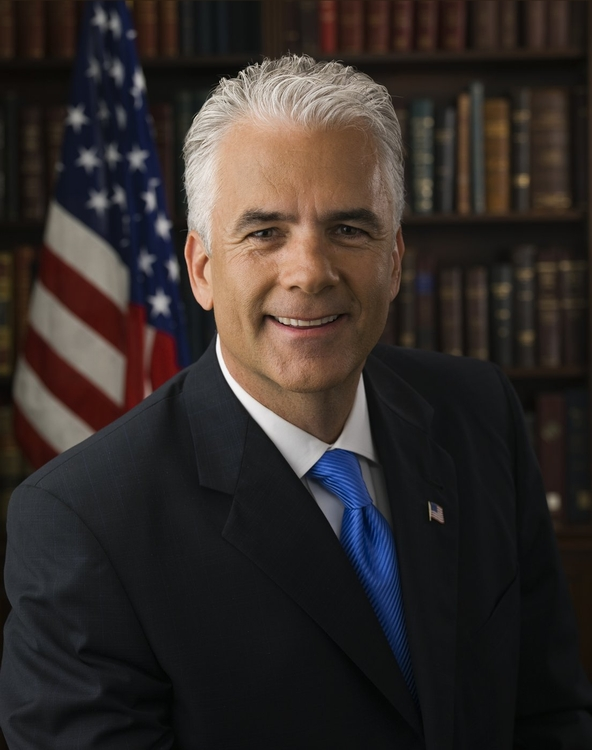

Nominee	John Ensign	Jack Carter
Party	Republican	Democratic
Popular vote	322,501	238,796
Percentage	55.4%	41.0%
- County results Ensign: 50–60% 60–70% 70–80%
U.S. senator before election
John Ensign
Republican
Elected U.S. Senator
John Ensign
Republican

Incumbent Republican John Ensign won re-election to a second term over Democrat Jack Carter, Navy veteran and son of President Jimmy Carter.

Democratic primary vote
Party	Candidate	Votes	%
Democratic	Jack Carter	92,270	78.30%
Democratic	None of these candidates	14,425	12.24%
Democratic	Ruby Jee Tun	11,147	9.46%
Total votes		117,842	100.00%

Republican primary
Party	Candidate	Votes	%
Republican	John Ensign (Incumbent)	127,023	90.47%
Republican	None of these candidates	6,754	4.81%
Republican	Ed Hamilton	6,629	4.72%
Total votes		140,406	100.00%

Popular Las Vegas mayor Oscar Goodman had said in January that he would probably run, but in late April, he decisively ruled that out. Goodman did not file by the May 12, 2006, deadline. Carter's advantages included his formidable speaking abilities and kinship with a former U.S. president. On the other hand, Ensign was also considered to be an effective speaker and as of the first quarter of 2006, held an approximately 5–1 advantage over Carter in cash-on-hand.

Nevada general election
Party	Candidate	Votes	%	±%
Republican	John Ensign (Incumbent)	322,501	55.36%	+0.27%
Democratic	Jack Carter	238,796	40.99%	+1.30%
None of These Candidates		8,232	1.41%	-0.50%
Independent American Party (Nevada)	David K. Schumann	7,774	1.33%	+0.91%
Libertarian	Brendan Trainor	5,269	0.90%	+0.01%
Majority		83,705	14.37%	−1.03%
Turnout		582,572		
Republican hold		Swing		

Ensign won a majority of the votes in every county in the state, with his lowest percentage at 53%.

== New Jersey ==
New Jersey election
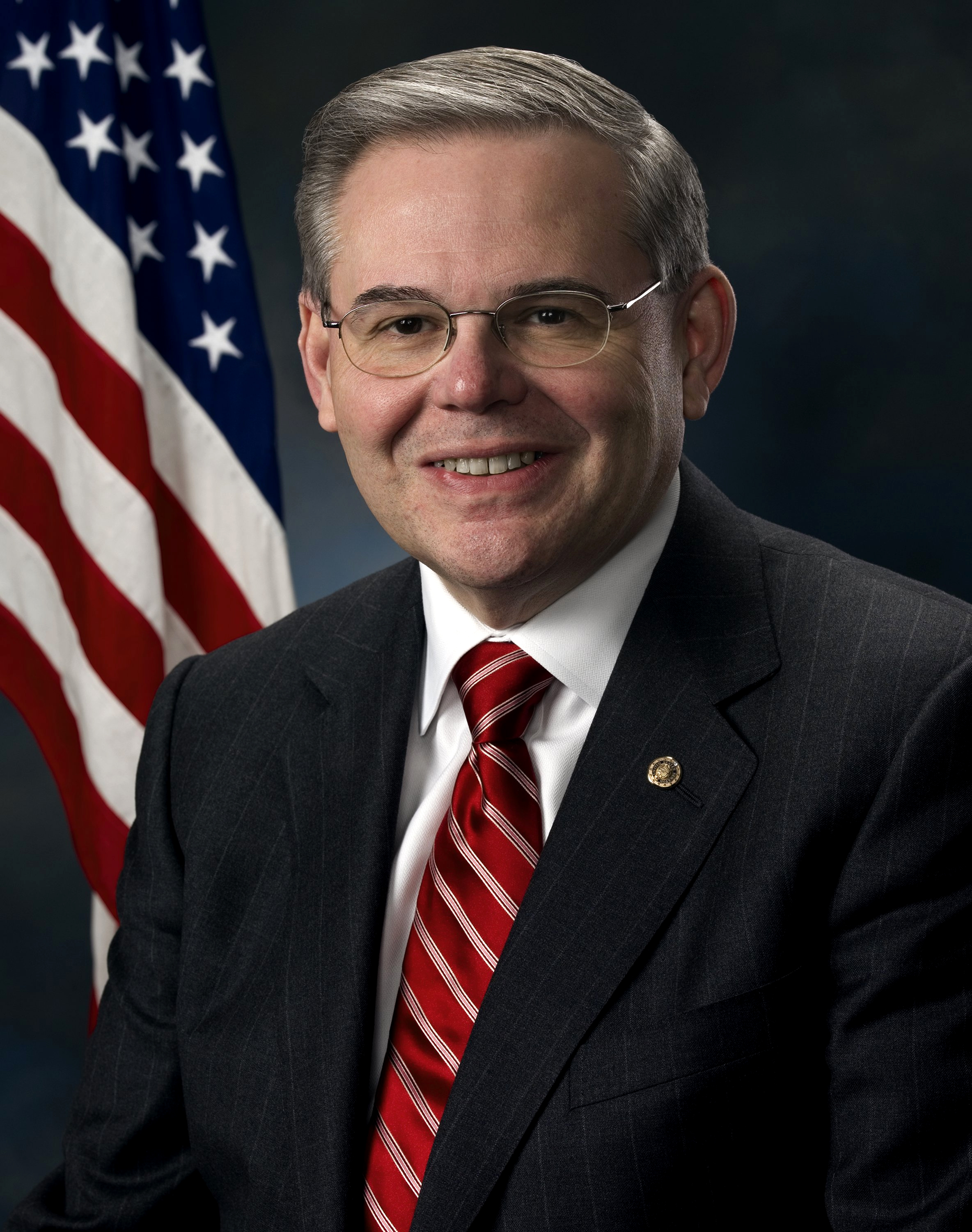

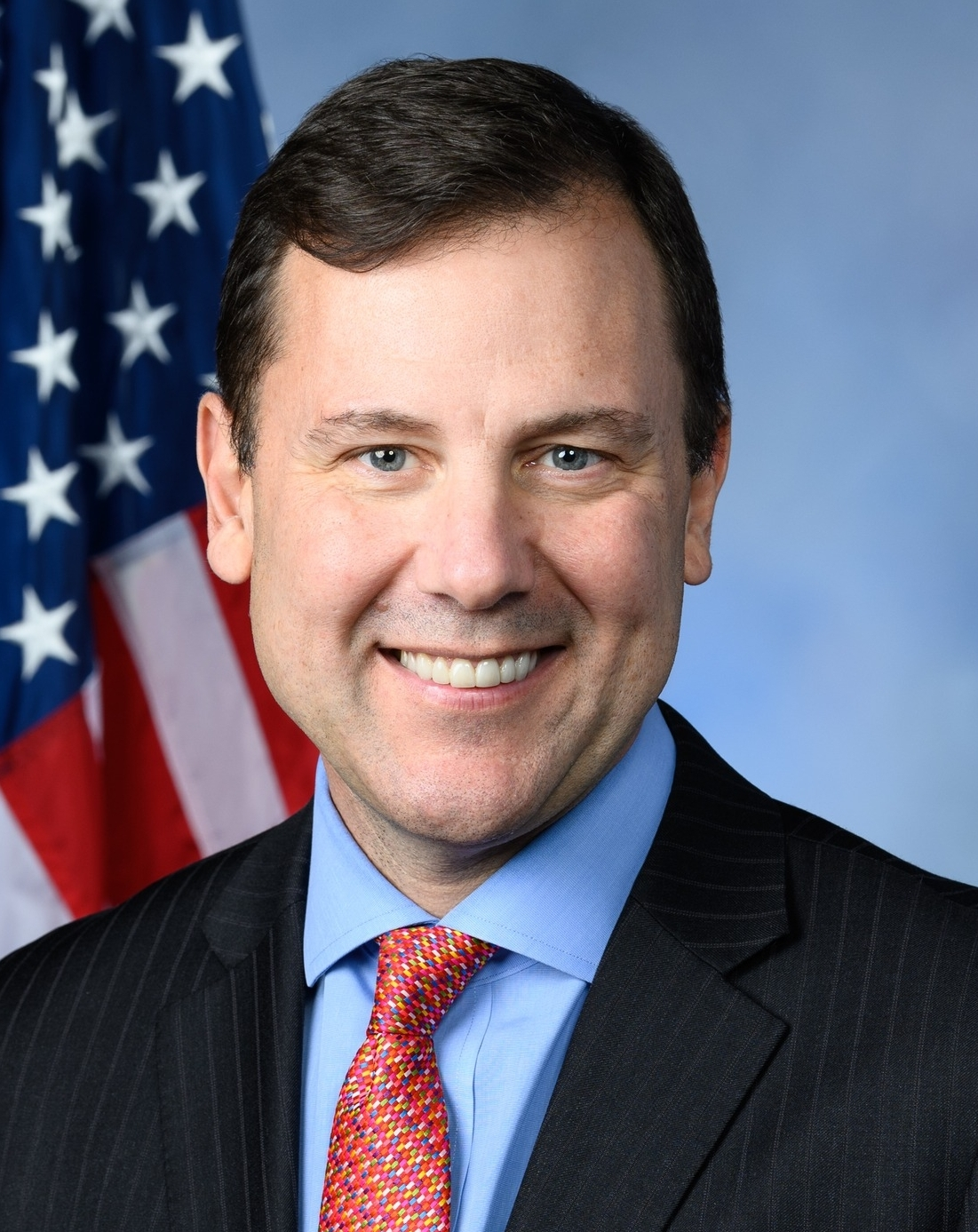
Nominee	Bob Menendez	Thomas Kean, Jr.
Party	Democratic	Republican
Popular vote	1,200,843	997,775
Percentage	53.3%	44.3%
- Menendez: 50–60% 60–70% 70–80% 80–90% 90–100% Kean: 40–50% 50–60% 60–70% 70–80% 80–90%
U.S. senator before election
Bob Menendez
Democratic
Elected U.S. Senator
Bob Menendez
Democratic

Incumbent Democrat Bob Menendez was elected for a full term. The seat was previously held by Democratic Governor of New Jersey Jon Corzine. After Corzine resigned and was sworn in Governor, Corzine appointed Congressman Menendez on January 18, 2006. Menendez was challenged by Republican Thomas Kean, Jr. and seven other candidates. Filing for the primary closed on April 10, 2006. The primary election was held June 6, 2006. Menendez became the first Hispanic to hold a U.S. Senate seat from New Jersey, and was the first Latino elected to statewide office in the state.

Menendez won the Democratic primary, with 86% of the vote, against James D. Kelly, Jr.

Republican John P. Ginty, associate director with Standard & Poor's represented the conservative wing of the New Jersey Republican party. Kean was a moderate, and the son of the former Governor of New Jersey Thomas Kean. Kean won the primary by a 3–1 margin.

The biggest factors in the New Jersey Senate race may have had little to do with the candidates involved and more to do with Governor of New Jersey Jon Corzine and President George W. Bush.

In mid-summer, Jon Corzine and the Democratic-controlled state legislature held a brief shutdown of state government, which ultimately resulted in a sales tax increase, among other things.

In a September 2006 poll, SurveyUSA found that Corzine received an approval rate of only 43%, with 48% of the state disapproving. Since Menendez had been appointed by Corzine, some pundits argued that this would be a resonating factor with a number of voters.

According to a separate September 2006 poll, SurveyUSA found that the state of New Jersey had a rather high disapproval rating for Republican President George W. Bush, with 64% disapproving and only 32% approving. This led some to argue that voters would take their discontent with Bush out on Kean in the November election.

Indeed, some pollsters demonstrated that concerns over the Iraq War and discontent with President Bush solidified the Democratic base in October's advertising blitz, and won over enough independents to seal of fate of the Republican nominee. On the eve of the election, Fairleigh Dickinson University's PublicMind Poll reported that 65% likely voters said that the US invasion of Iraq was a mistake, "including nine of ten Democrats and six of ten independents." Observers also pointed out that "from the beginning, [Menendez] made much of his 2002 vote against the Iraq War Resolution, often referring to it as one of the most important votes of his career. He made it clear as well that he intended to make the race a referendum on the President."

Others attributed Kean's early strong showing in the polls of this blue state to uninformed voters confusing the three-year state senator with his father, the popular former governor and 9/11 Commission chairman.

Because of Kean's perceived liberalism on social issues, he has been labeled by some conservatives as a "Republican in Name Only".

On June 13, 2006, Kean held a fundraiser in Ocean County featuring First Lady Laura Bush. It was here that both Senator Kean and Mrs. Bush pointed out that Kean is not George W. Bush, claiming that Senator Menendez seems to confuse the two.

On June 16, 2006, at a New Jersey Association of Counties speaking event in Atlantic City, Kean and his aides beat a hasty retreat from the ballroom engagement and "stampeded" into an elevator in an abortive attempt to avoid the press, only to exit on the same floor as they had entered. Kean declined to answer questions about the scathing attacks on his integrity which his opponent had delivered minutes earlier, instead opting to repeat "a few slogans."

In late June, the Associated Press reported that Kean's campaign was planning a "Swift Boat"-style film accusing Menendez of involvement in a New Jersey mob-connected kickback scheme "despite public records and statements disputing that claim." The AP article noted that "[f]our former federal prosecutors who oversaw the case have said Menendez was never involved in any wrongdoing." The airing of unsubstantiated allegations years or even decades old is a hallmark of the Swift Boat Veterans for Truth campaign attack style, which gained notoriety during the 2004 U.S. presidential election.

In mid-September, The Star-Ledger reported that Sen. Menendez had declined a national debate with Kean on the popular Sunday morning talk-show, Meet the Press. A Menendez spokesperson stated that the incumbent Democrat would prefer to focus on local citizens and press. Menendez did agree to take place in three locally aired debates with Kean, which were aired between October 7–17. Kean withdrew from one of the scheduled debates to which he had previously committed, an October 14, 2006, debate sponsored by the League of Women Voters, insisting on a national TV debate as a condition of his participation.

Both candidates agreed to participate in a virtual debate sponsored by the nonpartisan Hall Institute of Public Policy - New Jersey which provided "an unprecedented opportunity for candidates and citizens to engage in an interactive forum on the important issues confronting" New Jersey. Beginning in July and running through Election Day in November, the institute submitted questions to the candidates and then posted their responses on its website.

New Jersey general election
Party	Candidate	Votes	%	±%
Democratic	Bob Menendez (Incumbent)	1,200,843	53.3%	+3.1%
Republican	Thomas Kean, Jr.	997,775	44.3%	−2.8%
Libertarian	Len Flynn	14,637	0.7%	+0.4%
Marijuana	Edward Forchion	11,593	0.5%	
Independent	J. M. Carter	7,918	0.4%	+0.2%
Independent	N. Leonard Smith	6,243	0.3%	
Independent	Daryl Brooks	5,138	0.2%	
Socialist Workers	Angela Lariscy	3,433	0.2%	+0.1%
Socialist	Gregory Pason	2,490	0.1%	+0.0%
Majority		203,068	9.0%	
Turnout		2,250,070		
Democratic hold		Swing	3.26%	

== New Mexico ==
New Mexico election
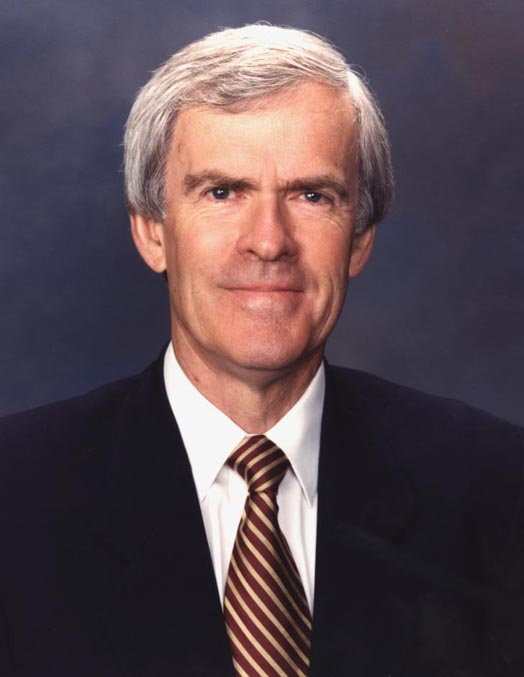

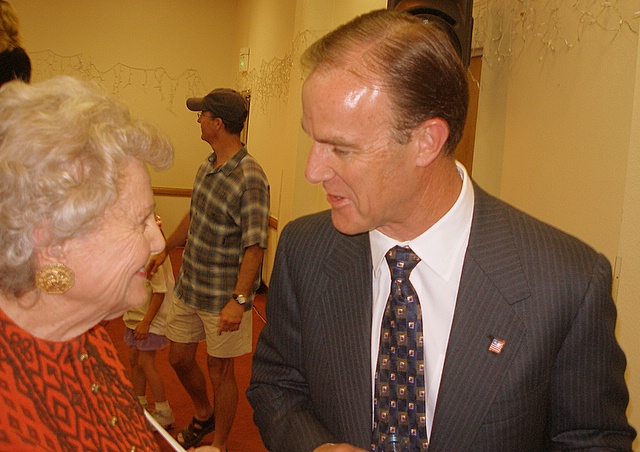
Nominee	Jeff Bingaman	Allen McCulloch
Party	Democratic	Republican
Popular vote	394,365	163,826
Percentage	70.6%	29.3%
- County results Bingaman: 50–60% 60–70% 70–80% 80–90%
U.S. senator before election
Jeff Bingaman
Democratic
Elected U.S. Senator
Jeff Bingaman
Democratic

Incumbent Democrat Jeff Bingaman won re-election to a fifth term.

Democratic primary
Party	Candidate	Votes	%
Democratic	Jeff Bingaman (Incumbent)	115,198	100.00%
Total votes		115,198	100.00%

David Pfeffer, Santa Fe City Councilman announced on August 23, 2005, that he would be entering the primary. A former Democrat, he supported George W. Bush in 2004 and became a Republican in 2005. In his campaign announcement, Pfeffer focused mainly on border controls with Mexico. He criticised Bingaman in comparison to his own support for reform of the Social Security system and the Iraq War as well as U.S. relations with China, saying "With all due respect, I do not believe the present occupier of the junior seat from New Mexico is doing all that can and should be done on these fronts," he said of Bingaman. "I believe I can do a better job ... " Pfeffer also commented that he would have a hard time raising an amount equivalent to Senator Bingaman, a problem faced by any of the latter's potential challengers.

Republican primary
Party	Candidate	Votes	%
Republican	Allen McCulloch	29,592	51.04%
Republican	Joseph J. Carraro	18,312	31.59%
Republican	David Pfeffer	10,070	17.37%
Total votes		57,974	100.00%

Bingaman had a 60% approval rating in one poll. He faced no primary opposition. There had been speculation that Bingaman would give up the chance to run for another term to become a lobbyist.

New Mexico general election
Party	Candidate	Votes	%	±%
Democratic	Jeff Bingaman (Incumbent)	394,365	70.61%	+8.90%
Republican	Allen McCulloch	163,826	29.33%	−8.92%
Write-ins		376	0.06%	
Majority		230,539	41.27%	+17.83%
Turnout		558,567		
Democratic hold		Swing		

Bingaman won every county in the state with at least 56% of the vote.

== New York ==
New York election

Nominee	Hillary Rodham Clinton	John Spencer
Party	Democratic	Republican
Popular vote	3,008,428	1,392,189
Percentage	67.0%	31.0%
- County results Clinton: 50–60% 60–70% 70–80% 80–90% Spencer: 40–50% 50–60%
U.S. senator before election
Hillary Rodham Clinton
Democratic
Elected U.S. Senator
Hillary Rodham Clinton
Democratic

Incumbent Democrat Hillary Rodham Clinton won by a more than two-to-one margin. Clinton was challenged by Republican John Spencer, a former Mayor of Yonkers, New York.

Democratic primary
Party	Candidate	Votes	%
Democratic	Hillary Rodham Clinton (Incumbent)	640,955	83.00%
Democratic	Jonathan B. Tasini	124,999	17.00%
Total votes		765,954	100.00%

New York Republican Senate primary results 2006
Party	Candidate	Votes	%
Republican	John Spencer	114,914	60.79%
Republican	K.T. McFarland	74,108	39.21%
Total votes		189,022	100%

Clinton spent $36 million for her re-election, more than any other candidate for Senate in the 2006 elections.

On November 7, 2006, Clinton won easily, garnering 67% of the vote to Spencer's 31%. The election was not close, with Clinton winning 58 of New York's 62 counties. Clinton had a surprisingly strong performance in upstate New York which tends to be a tossup. When Clinton's upstate margins combined with her huge numbers out of New York City, there was no coming back for the Republicans. Clinton was sworn in for what would be her last term in the Senate, serving from January 3, 2007, to January 21, 2009, when she assumed the office of United States Secretary of State.

New York general election
Party	Candidate	Votes	%	±%
Democratic	Hillary Rodham Clinton	2,698,931		
Independence	Hillary Rodham Clinton	160,705		
Working Families	Hillary Rodham Clinton	148,792		
total	Hillary Rodham Clinton (Incumbent)	3,008,428	67.0	+11.7%
Republican	John Spencer	1,212,902		
Conservative	John Spencer	179,287		
total	John Spencer	1,392,189	31.0%	−12.0%
Green	Howie Hawkins	55,469	1.2%	+0.6%
Libertarian	Jeff Russell	20,996	0.5%	+0.4%
Socialist Equality	Bill Van Auken	6,004	0.1%	n/a
Socialist Workers	Roger Calero	6,967	0.2%	+0.2%
Majority		1,616,239	36.0%	
Turnout		4,490,053	38.48%	
Democratic hold		Swing	+11.9	

Percentages do not add to 100% due to rounding.
Clinton and Spencer totals include their minor party line votes: Independence Party and Working Families Party for Clinton, Conservative Party for Spencer.
In addition, 213,777 ballots were blank, void, or scattered, and are not included in the Turnout sum or percentages.

== North Dakota ==
North Dakota election
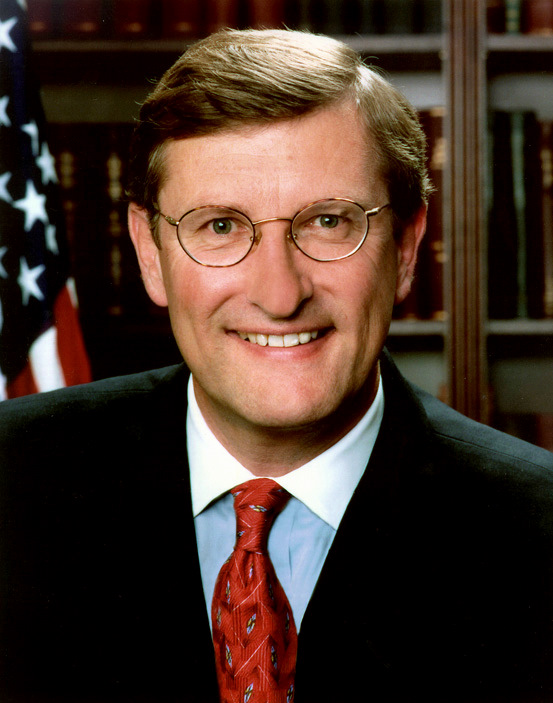

Nominee	Kent Conrad	Dwight Grotberg
Party	Democratic–NPL	Republican
Popular vote	150,146	64,417
Percentage	68.8%	29.5%
- County results Conrad: 50–60% 60–70% 70–80% 80–90%
U.S. senator before election
Kent Conrad
Democratic–NPL
Elected U.S. Senator
Kent Conrad
Democratic–NPL

Incumbent Dem-NPL-er Kent Conrad won re-election to a fourth term, beating Republican farmer Dwight Grotberg.

Popular Republican governor John Hoeven was heavily recruited by prominent national Republicans, including Karl Rove and Dick Cheney to run against Conrad. SurveyUSA polls showed that both Conrad and Hoeven had among the highest approval ratings of any Senators and governors in the nation. A poll conducted by PMR (8/26-9/3 MoE 3.9) for The Forum of Fargo-Moorhead had as result for a hypothetical matchup: Hoeven-35%, Conrad-27%, Uncommitted-38%. This poll showed voter conflict between two very popular politicians in a small state where party loyalty is often trumped by personality. In late September 2005, Hoeven formally declined. Hoeven ran for the Senate in 2010 and was elected.

North Dakota general election
Party	Candidate	Votes	%	±%
Democratic–NPL	Kent Conrad (Incumbent)	150,146	68.8%	+7.4%
Republican	Dwight Grotberg	64,417	29.5%	−9.1%
Independent	Roland Riemers	2,194	1.0%	n/a
Independent	James Germalic	1,395	0.6%	n/a
Majority		85,729	39.3%	
Turnout		218,154	44.5%	
Democratic hold		Swing	+8.3	

Conrad won at least 53% of the vote in every county in the state.

== Ohio ==
Ohio election
- Turnout: 53.25% (Registered Voters)
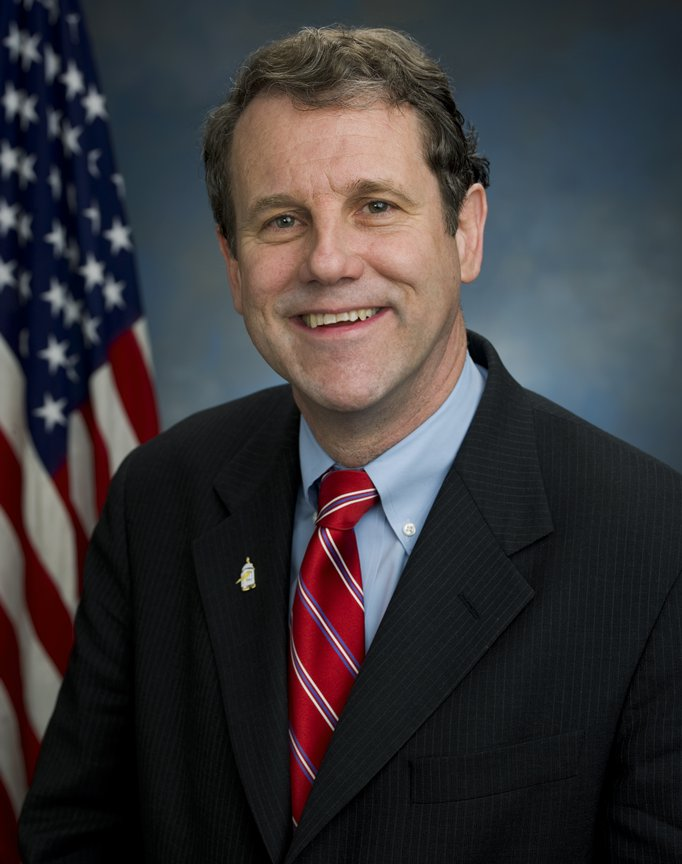

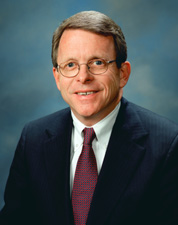
Nominee	Sherrod Brown	Mike DeWine
Party	Democratic	Republican
Popular vote	2,257,369	1,761,037
Percentage	56.2%	43.8%
- Brown: 50–60% 60–70% 70–80% DeWine: 50–60% 60–70%
U.S. senator before election
Mike DeWine
Republican
Elected U.S. Senator
Sherrod Brown
Democratic

Incumbent Republican Mike DeWine ran for re-election but lost to Democratic congressman Sherrod Brown.

DeWine had approval ratings at 38%, making him the second most unpopular U.S. Senator, behind Pennsylvania Republican Rick Santorum, who was also up for re-election in 2006. Pre-election stories in the U.S. media suggested that the national Republican Party may have given up on saving Senator DeWine's senate seat before election date. Sherrod Brown, former Ohio Secretary of State and U.S. Representative from Ohio's 13th district was the Democratic candidate, and the eventual winner.

Paul Hackett, Iraq War veteran announced on February 13, 2006, that he would withdraw from the race, because national party leaders had decided that Sherrod Brown had a better chance against DeWine. The Plain Dealer (2/18/06) also reported that there had been concerns that Hackett might not have had enough money after the primary to run the statewide advertising customary for a Senate campaign.

Democratic primary
Party	Candidate	Votes	%
Democratic	Sherrod Brown	583,776	78.11%
Democratic	Merrill Kesier Jr.	163,628	21.89%
Total votes		747,404	100.00%

Both Republican challengers, engineer William G. Pierce and David Smith, candidate for OH-02 in 2005, campaigned as conservative alternatives to DeWine, citing DeWine's support for legal abortion and his role as one of the Republican members of the Gang of 14 who compromised with Democrats in a dispute about judicial appointments. DeWine won the primary 71.82% of the votes.

Because this race was targeted by Democrats, it made it all the more important to the GOP, who desired to retain Senate control. John McClelland, a spokesman for the Ohio Republican Party said, "It's vitally important to the Republican Party as a whole, so I think that's why you see the president coming to Ohio to support Mike DeWine. Phil Singer, a spokesman for the Democratic Senatorial Campaign Committee said, "Mike DeWine Senior is in for the fight of his life, make no mistake about it".

On July 14, 2006, DeWine's campaign began airing TV commercials depicting a smoking World Trade Center. "The senator was notified ... by a reporter at U.S. News & World Report that the image of the burning Twin Towers could not have depicted the actual event because the smoke was blowing the wrong way." DeWine's campaign admitted that the video was actually a still photo of the World Trade Center with smoke digitally added. He also was criticized for using an emotionally charged image to attack his challenger.

Another of DeWine's ads suggested that opponent Sherrod Brown did not pay his taxes for thirteen years. This claim led to the Associated Press reporting on October 19 that, "Several Ohio television stations have stopped airing a Republican ad because state documents contradict the ad's accusation that Democratic U.S. Senate candidate Sherrod Brown didn't pay an unemployment tax bill for 13 years." Brown produced a commercial citing these facts. DeWine's ads were changed to state only that he had failed to pay his unemployment taxes until legal action was taken against him.

According to an article in the October 16, 2006, edition of The New York Times, top Republican party officials on the national level determined that DeWine would probably be defeated and were moving financial support from his race to other Republican senatorial candidates they felt were more likely to win.

Brown was called the winner right when the polls closed at 7:30. DeWine had the second worst performance of a Republican incumbent in 2006. Only Rick Santorum in Pennsylvania had a worse performance. While DeWine was able to win rural counties in western Ohio, Brown managed to win most eastern Ohio counties, especially in heavily populated areas. DeWine's narrow 2,000 vote victory in Hamilton County which is home to Cincinnati, came nowhere close to making a dent in Brown's lead. Brown would go on to be re-elected in 2012 and again in 2018. Brown would lose reelection in 2024.

Ohio general election
Party	Candidate	Votes	%	±%
Democratic	Sherrod Campbell Brown	2,257,369	56.16%	+20.0%
Republican	Richard Michael DeWine (Incumbent)	1,761,037	43.82%	−15.8%
Independent	Richard Duncan	830	0.02%	n/a
Majority		452,690	12.34%	
Turnout		4,019,236	53.25%	
Democratic gain from Republican		Swing	-17.9	

== Pennsylvania ==
Pennsylvania election
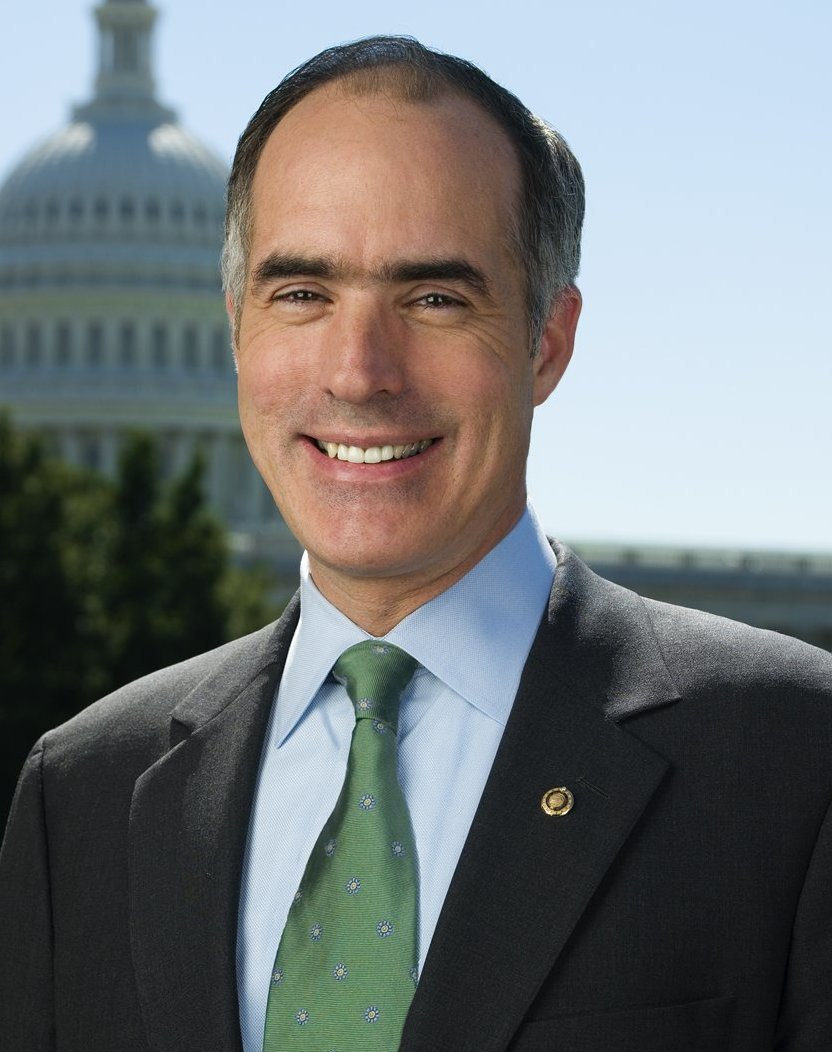

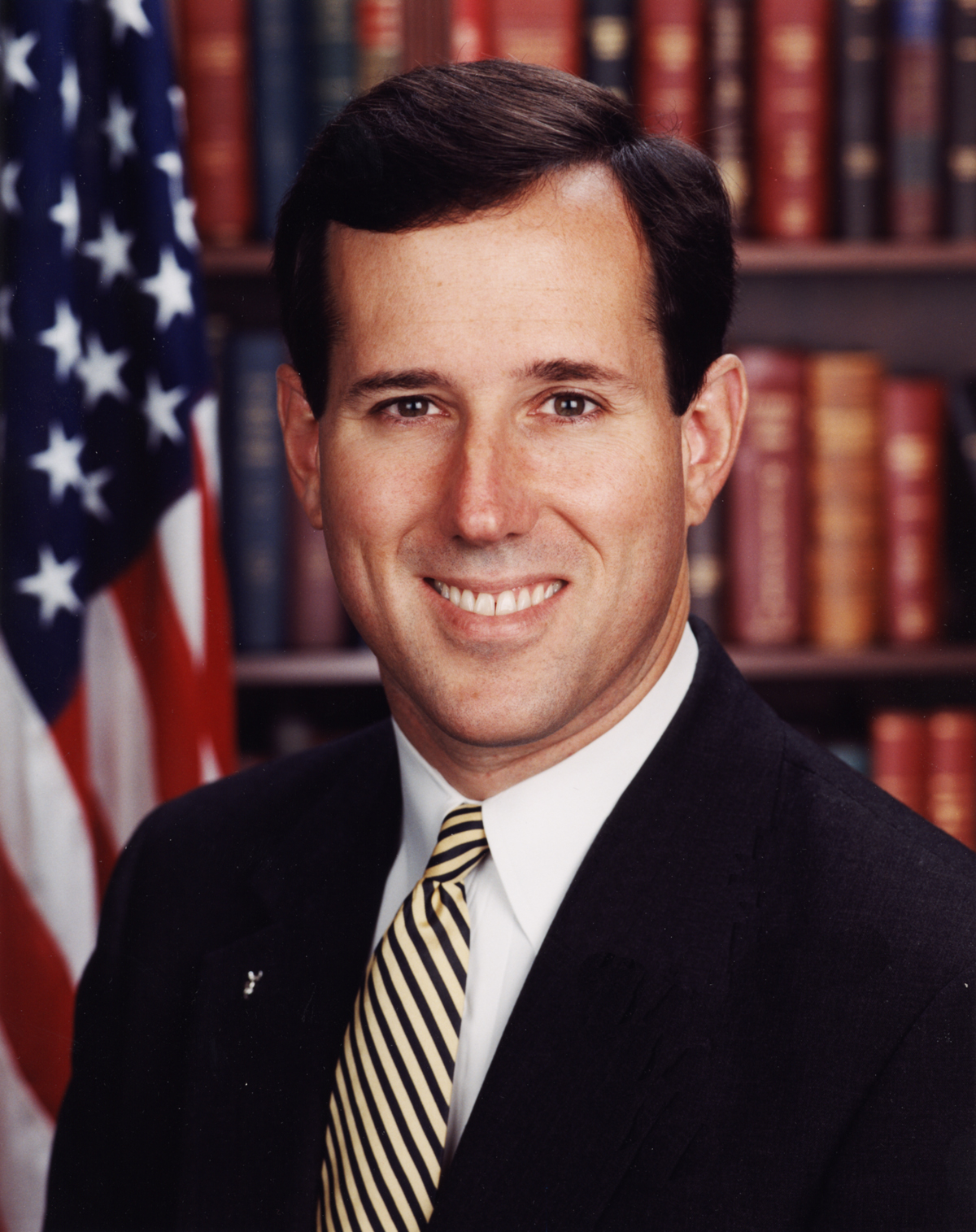
Nominee	Bob Casey, Jr.	Rick Santorum
Party	Democratic	Republican
Popular vote	2,392,984	1,684,778
Percentage	58.6%	41.3%
- Casey: 50–60% 60–70% 80–90% Santorum: 50–60% 60–70%
U.S. senator before election
Rick Santorum
Republican
Elected U.S. Senator
Bob Casey, Jr.
Democratic

Incumbent Republican Rick Santorum ran for re-election to a third term, but was defeated by Bob Casey, Jr. Casey was elected to serve between January 3, 2007, and January 3, 2013. Santorum trailed Casey in every public poll taken during the campaign. Casey's margin of victory (nearly 18% of those who voted) was the largest ever for a Democratic Senate nominee in Pennsylvania, and the largest margin of victory for a Senate challenger in the 2006 elections.

Bob Casey, Jr., State Treasurer, former State Auditor General and son of former Governor Bob Casey, Sr. won the Democratic primary.

Democratic primary, May 16, 2006
Party	Candidate	Votes	%	±%
Democratic	Bob Casey, Jr.	629,271	84.5%	N/A
Democratic	Chuck Pennacchio	66,364	8.9%	N/A
Democratic	Alan Sandals	48,113	6.5%	N/A
Democratic	Others	1,114	0.1%	N/A
Majority		115,591	68.9%	N/A
Turnout		744,862		+1.3%

Santorum was unopposed in the Republican primary. Republican John Featherman (not to be confused with John Fetterman), who ran against Santorum in 2000 as a Libertarian, had been expected to challenge him in the 2006 Republican primary. However, Featherman withdrew his candidacy after a GOP petition challenge because he did not have the necessary number of signatures to get on the ballot.

Republican strategists took as a bad omen Santorum's primary result in 2006, in which he ran unopposed for the Republican nomination. Republican gubernatorial nominee Lynn Swann, also unopposed in the primary, garnered 22,000 more votes statewide than Santorum in the primary, meaning thousands of Republican voters abstained from endorsing Santorum for another Senate term. This may have been partly due to Santorum's support for Arlen Specter, over Congressman Pat Toomey in the 2004 Republican primary for the U.S. Senate. Even though Santorum was perceived to be only slightly less conservative than Toomey, he joined virtually all of the state and national Republican establishment in supporting the moderate Specter. This led many socially and fiscally conservative Republicans to consider Santorum's support of Specter to be a betrayal of their cause. However, Santorum said that he supported Specter to avoid risking a Toomey loss in the general election, which would have prevented President George W. Bush's judicial nominees from getting through the Senate. Santorum said Supreme Court Justice Samuel Alito would not have been confirmed without the help of Specter, who was chairman of the Senate Judiciary Committee at the time.

Pennsylvania general election
Party	Candidate	Votes	%	±%
Democratic	Bob Casey, Jr.	2,392,984	58.64%	+13.2%
Republican	Rick Santorum (Incumbent)	1,684,778	41.28%	−11.1%
Write-in		3,281	0.08%	
Majority		710,204	17.36%	+10.5%
Turnout		4,081,043		
Democratic gain from Republican		Swing	-24.4%	

At 9:45 pm EST on Election Night, Santorum called Casey to concede defeat.

== Rhode Island ==
Rhode Island election
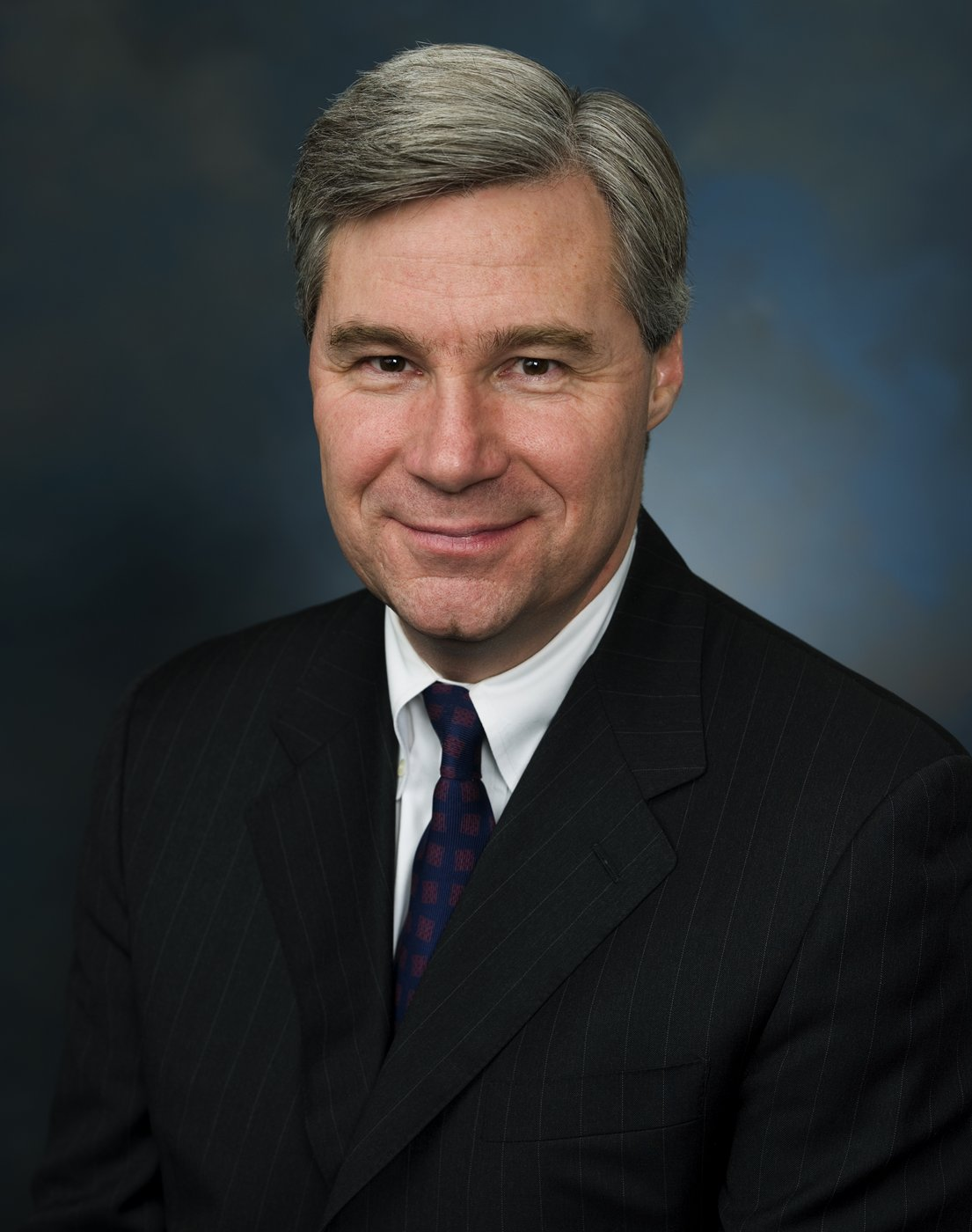

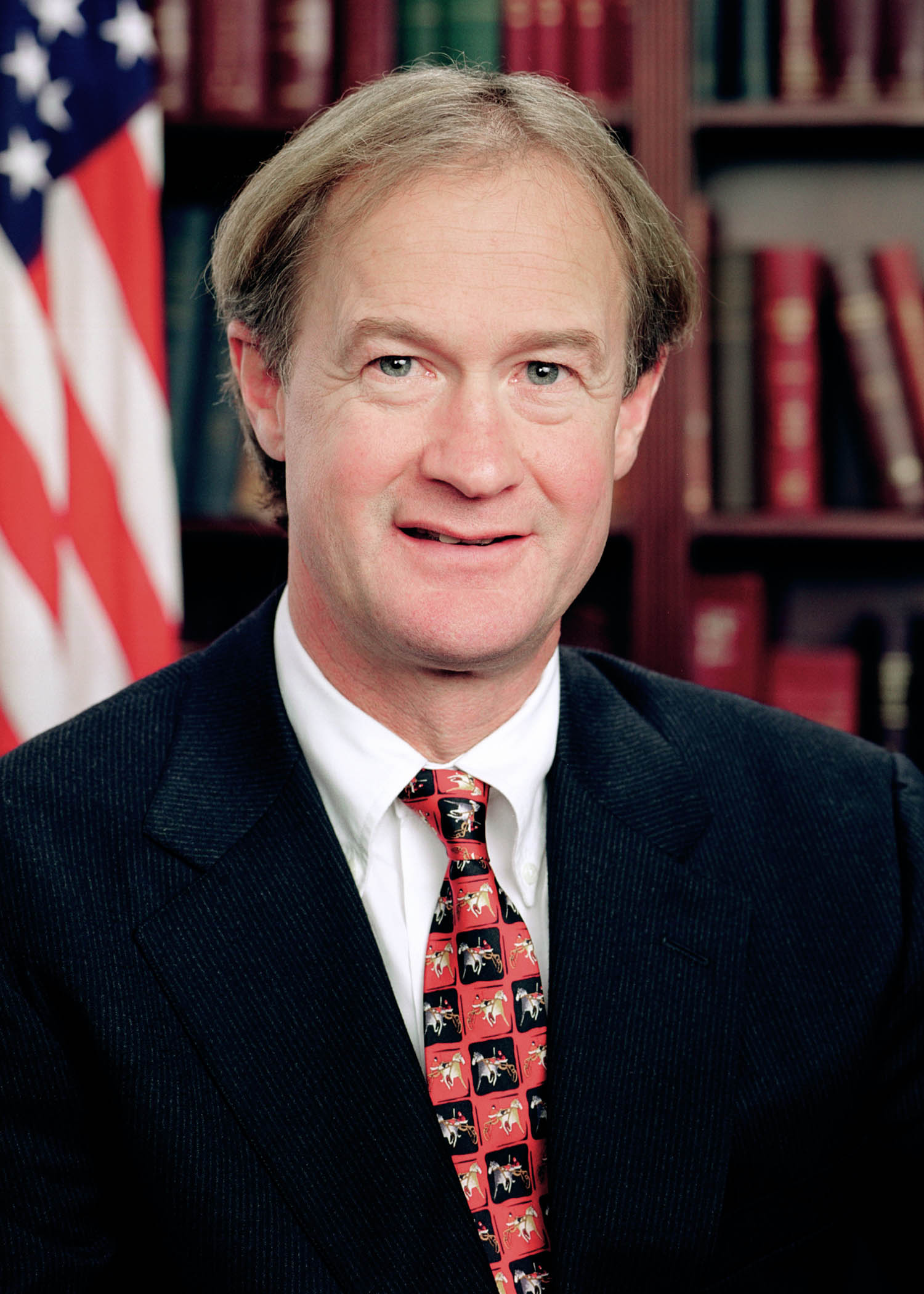
Nominee	Sheldon Whitehouse	Lincoln Chafee
Party	Democratic	Republican
Popular vote	206,109	179,001
Percentage	53.5%	46.5%
- Whitehouse: 50–60% 60–70% 70–80% Chafee: 50–60% 60–70%
U.S. senator before election
Lincoln Chafee
Republican
Elected U.S. Senator
Sheldon Whitehouse
Democratic

The election was won by Sheldon Whitehouse, former Attorney General of Rhode Island and former U.S. Attorney for the District of Rhode Island. Republican Lincoln Chafee was seeking re-election for a second full term to the seat he had held since 1999, when he was appointed to fill the vacancy created by the death of his father John Chafee. Lincoln Chafee won election to the seat in 2000.

Whitehouse was endorsed by U.S. Senator Jack Reed, U.S. Congressmen Jim Langevin and Patrick J. Kennedy, as well as by former candidate Matt Brown. Carl Sheeler, a former U.S. Marine, a business owner, and an adjunct professor of business, ran on a more progressive platform. Ultimately, however, Whitehouse would trounce his competition in the primary on September 12, winning his party's support by a large margin.

Democratic primary
Party	Candidate	Votes	%
Democratic	Sheldon Whitehouse	69,290	81.53%
Democratic	Christopher F. Young	8,939	10.52%
Democratic	Carl Sheeler	6,755	7.95%
Total votes		84,984	100.00%

Incumbent Lincoln Chafee was one of the most liberal members of the Republican Party in the Senate by 2006, and was challenged for the Republican nomination by Steve Laffey, Mayor of Cranston, who had criticized Chafee for his liberal voting record in the Senate. In early 2006, the Club for Growth, a pro-tax cut political action committee, sent a series of mailings to Rhode Island Republicans attacking Chafee's positions and voting record.

The national GOP supported Chafee in the primary campaign, believing that he was the most likely candidate to hold the seat in the general election. Senator Mitch McConnell of Kentucky, John McCain of Arizona and Laura Bush appeared at fundraisers for Chafee, while Senator Bill Frist's PAC donated to Chafee. The National Republican Senatorial Committee also ran ads in the state supporting Chafee. Steve Laffey, however, picked up many endorsements from Republican town committees throughout Rhode Island, the national group Club for Growth, and former candidate for the party's presidential nomination Steve Forbes. On July 10, 2006, the National Republican Senatorial Committee filed a complaint with the Federal Election Commission against Laffey, saying that he had included a political communication in tax bills mailed to residents of Cranston.

Republican primary
Party	Candidate	Votes	%
Republican	Lincoln Chafee (incumbent)	34,936	54%
Republican	Steve Laffey	29,547	46%
Total votes		64,483	100.00%

Democrats believed that this was one of the most likely Senate seats to switch party control, due to the Democratic tilt of Rhode Island, as well as the fact that Chafee needed to expend part of his campaign fund to win the Republican primary election. Chafee's approval ratings also took a beating from his primary battle with Laffey and may have hurt him in the general election. Another factor that hurt Chafee was the fact that Whitehouse, the Democratic nominee, had a huge head start on him, as he was able to campaign with little opposition for at least half the year and had not had to contend with a major opponent until the general election campaign. Rhode Islanders' historically large disapproval ratings for President Bush and the Republican Party as a whole was another major hurdle for Chafee.

Whitehouse and Chafee very rarely disagreed on political issues. Socially, they agreed almost 100% of the time. Chafee was against the Bush tax cuts, indicating his ideology was liberal-leaning. On some fiscal issues they disagreed on such as on social security and free trade.

Rhode Island general election
Party	Candidate	Votes	%	±%
Democratic	Sheldon Whitehouse	206,043	53.52%	+12.37%
Republican	Lincoln Chafee (incumbent)	178,950	46.48%	−10.40%
Majority		27,093	7.04%	−8.69%
Turnout		384,993		
Democratic gain from Republican		Swing		

Whitehouse carried Providence County, which contains approximately 60% of the state's population, with 59% to Chafee's 41%. Chafee's strongest showing was in Washington County ("South County"), where he took 55% of the vote against Whitehouse's 45%. Chafee also took Kent County by a small margin, while Whitehouse was victorious by extremely slim margins in Bristol and Newport counties.

After the election, when asked by a reporter if he thought his defeat would help the country by giving Democrats control of Congress, he replied, "to be honest, yes."

== Tennessee ==
Tennessee election
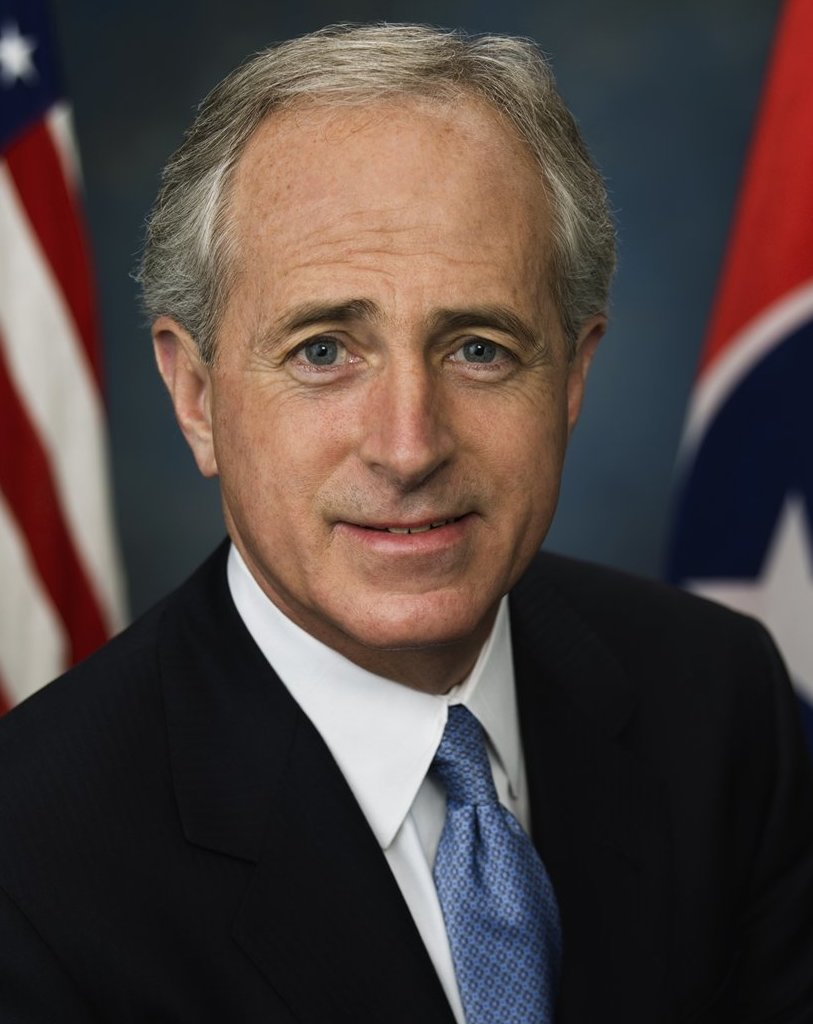

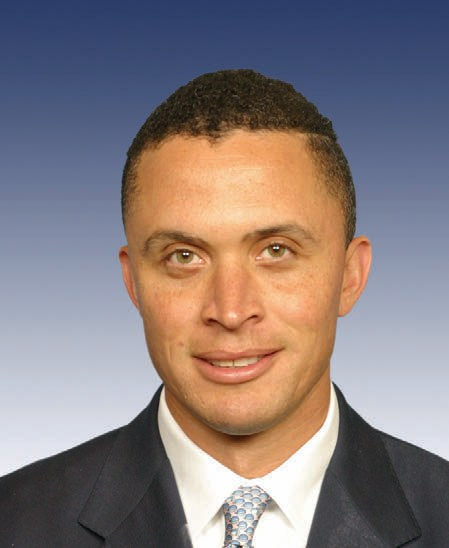
Nominee	Bob Corker	Harold Ford, Jr.
Party	Republican	Democratic
Popular vote	929,911	879,976
Percentage	50.7%	48.0%
- Corker: 40–50% 50–60% 60–70% Ford: 40–50% 50–60% 60–70%
U.S. senator before election
Bill Frist
Republican
Elected U.S. Senator
Bob Corker
Republican

Winner Bob Corker replaced Republican Bill Frist who retired upon the end of his second term in 2007. Corker was the Republican nominee, and the Democratic nominee was Harold Ford, Jr., U.S. Representative. The race between Ford and Corker was one of the most competitive Senate races of 2006, with Corker winning the race by less than three percent of the vote. Corker was the only non-incumbent Republican to win a U.S. Senate seat in 2006. Since 1994, the Republican Party has held both of Tennessee's Senate seats.

Ford is known nationally for his keynote address at the 2000 Democratic National Convention in Los Angeles, California, and for a challenge to Nancy Pelosi for leadership of the House Democrats. Rosalind Kurita, a six-term state Senator from Clarksville, Tennessee, dropped out of the race in early April 2006. No official reason was given, but Ford enjoyed substantial support from Democratic leaders in Washington and Nashville and held a substantial lead in fundraising. Ford won the Democratic nomination by a wide margin in the primary.

Only 11 percent of Tennesseans knew who Corker was when he began running for the Senate race. All three Republicans had run statewide campaigns in the past, albeit unsuccessful ones: former U.S. Representative Ed Bryant for the 2002 Republican Senate nomination, losing to Lamar Alexander; businessman and former Mayor of Chattanooga Bob Corker for the U.S. Senate in 1994, losing to Frist in the Republican primary; and former U.S. Representative Van Hilleary for Tennessee Governor in 2002, losing to Democrat Phil Bredesen. Corker won the nomination by obtaining 48% of the primary vote to Bryant's 34% and Hilleary's 17%.

Not long after Corker's primary victory was assured, Ford, at a rally of his supporters attended by Bill Clinton, challenged Corker to seven televised debates across the state. In response, Corker said he will debate Ford but did not agree to Ford's request of seven debates. Both of Corker's primary opponents endorsed Corker immediately after they conceded the race.

Before a Corker press conference in Memphis on October 20, Ford approached Corker in a parking lot and confronted his opponent about Iraq in front of local news cameras, pointing out that some of Corker's fellow Republicans are changing their minds on the war and wanting to debate him about the issue. In response, Corker said, "I came to talk about ethics, and I have a press conference. And I think it's a true sign of desperation that you would pull your bus up when I'm having a press conference." Ford replied that he could never find Corker. Corker then walked away to his press conference.

On November 2, Nielsen Monitor Plus indicated that the Corker campaign had purchased more television advertising than any other Senate candidate in the country through October 15.

A particularly negative ad titled "Who Hasn't?" sponsored by the Republican National Committee ("RNC") that aired during the third and fourth weeks of October gained national attention and condemnation from both Ford and Corker. The ad portrayed a scantily clad white woman (Johanna Goldsmith) acting as a Playboy bunny who "met Harold at the Playboy party" and invites Ford to "call me".

Responding to questions about the ad, a Ford spokesperson said that Ford went to a 2005 Playboy-sponsored Super Bowl party that was attended by more than 3,000 people, and Ford himself said that he likes "football and girls" and makes no apology for either.

Democratic primary results
Party	Candidate	Votes	%
Democratic	Harold Ford Jr.	333,789	79.10%
Democratic	Gary Gene Davis	41,802	9.91%
Democratic	John Jay Hooker	27,175	6.44%
Democratic	Charles Smith	14,724	3.49%
Democratic	Alvin Strauss	4,410	1.05%
Total votes		421,900	100.00

Republican primary results
Party	Candidate	Votes	%
Republican	Bob Corker	231,541	48.13%
Republican	Ed Bryant	161,189	33.50%
Republican	Van Hilleary	83,078	17.27%
Republican	Tate Harrison	5,309	1.10%
Total votes		481,117	100.00

Tennessee general election
Party	Candidate	Votes	%	±%
Republican	Bob Corker	929,911	50.71%	−14.39
Democratic	Harold Ford, Jr.	879,976	47.99%	+15.78
Independent	Ed Choate	10,831	0.59%	N/A
Independent	David Gatchell	3,746	0.20%	N/A
Independent	Emory "Bo" Heyward	3,580	0.20%	N/A
Independent	H. Gary Keplinger	3,033	0.17%	N/A
Green	Chris Lugo	2,589	0.14%	N/A
Write-in		29	0.00%	N/A
Majority		49,935	2.72%	
Turnout		1,833,695	47.49%	
Republican hold		Swing	-14.39	

== Texas ==
Texas election
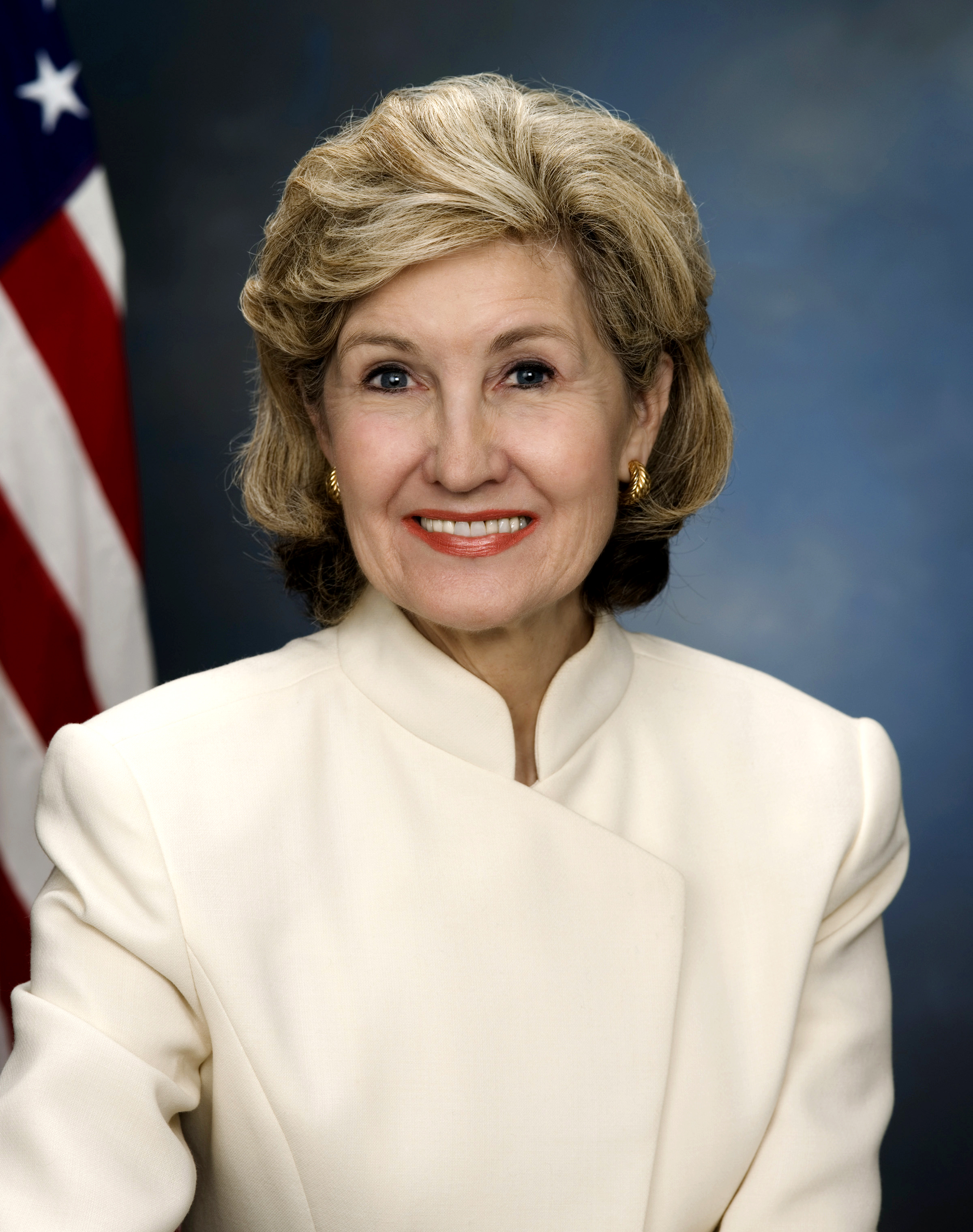

Nominee	Kay Bailey Hutchison	Barbara Ann Radnofsky
Party	Republican	Democratic
Popular vote	2,661,789	1,555,202
Percentage	61.7%	36.0%
- County results Hutchinson: 40–50% 50–60% 60–70% 70–80% 80–90% >90% Radnofsky: 50–60% 60–70% 70–80%
U.S. senator before election
Kay Bailey Hutchison
Republican
Elected U.S. Senator
Kay Bailey Hutchison
Republican

Incumbent Republican Kay Bailey Hutchison won re-election to a third term over Democratic attorney Barbara Ann Radnofsky.

The Democratic nominee who had never run for public office was expected to face a robust challenge in the general election, especially in a state that had not elected a Democrat statewide since 1994 and against a historically popular Hutchison. Since neither Radnofsky nor her main opponent, Gene Kelly, had received a majority of votes in the Democratic primary, a runoff was held April 11, 2006, which Radnofsky won. Scott Lanier Jameson won the Libertarian Party nomination at the party's state convention on June 10, 2006, defeating Timothy Wade and Ray Salinas. Arthur W. Loux, a Roman Forest City Councilman and a member of the Minutemen, was running as an independent.

Hutchison co-sponsored legislation supporting the creation of a constitutional amendment that would limit terms for senators but had been quoted saying that she would only leave after two terms if such a law applied to all senators. After deciding not to challenge Governor Rick Perry that year, as had been widely speculated, Hutchison ran for a third term. She had no opposition in the Republican primary and had approval ratings in the 60 percent range going into the General Election , although they had been slipping rapidly.

Texas general election
Party	Candidate	Votes	%	±%
Republican	Kay Bailey Hutchison (Incumbent)	2,661,789	61.69%	−4.65%
Democratic	Barbara Ann Radnofsky	1,555,202	36.04%	+3.69%
Libertarian	Scott Jameson	97,672	2.26%	+1.10%
Majority		1,106,587	25.7%	
Turnout		4,314,663		
Republican hold		Swing		

== Utah ==
Utah election
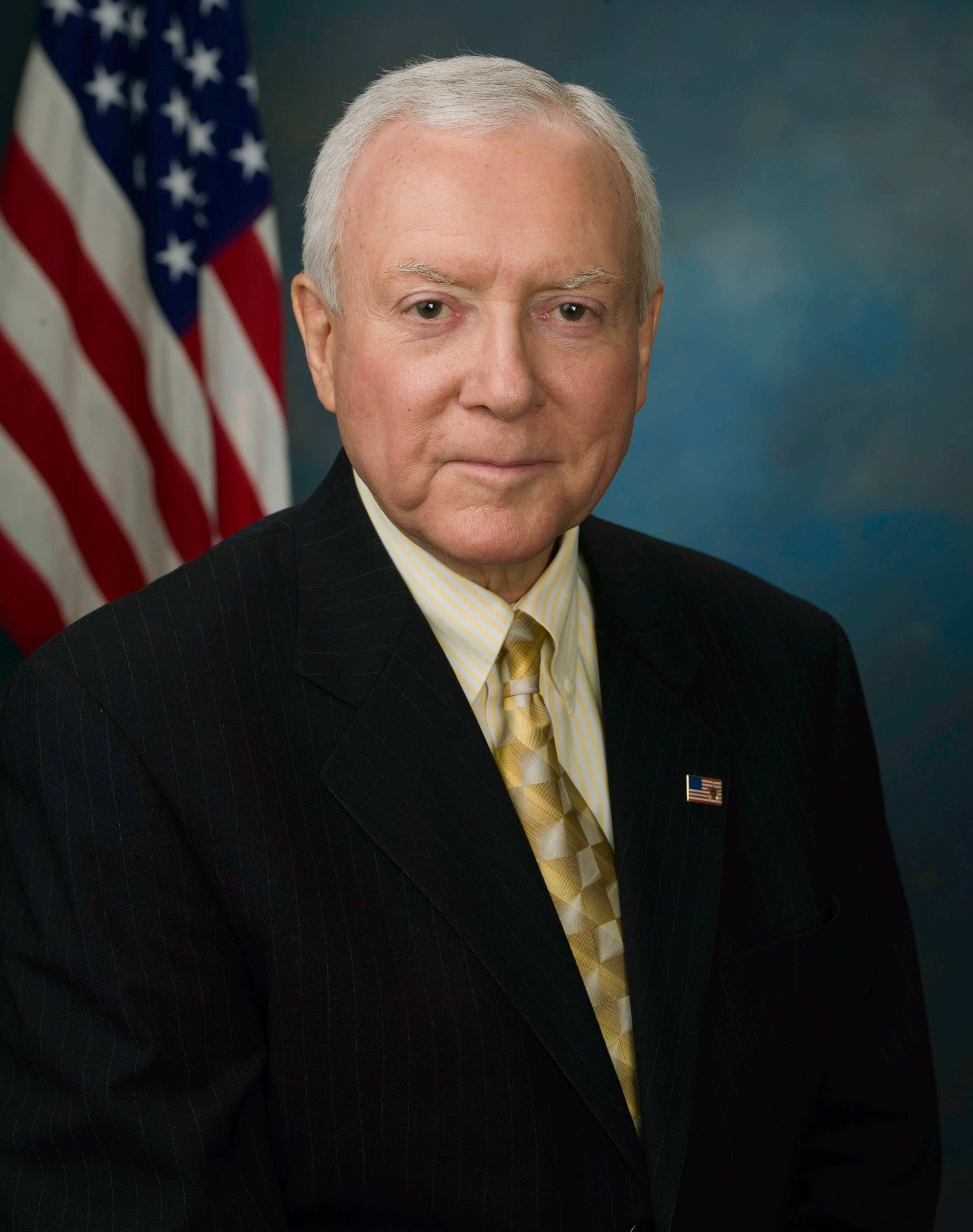

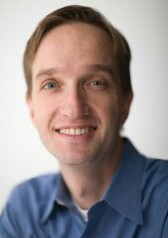
Nominee	Orrin Hatch	Pete Ashdown
Party	Republican	Democratic
Popular vote	356,238	177,459
Percentage	62.5%	31.1%
- County results Hatch: 40–50% 50–60% 60–70% 70–80% 80–90% Ashdown: 40–50%
U.S. senator before election
Orrin Hatch
Republican
Elected U.S. Senator
Orrin Hatch
Republican

Incumbent Republican Orrin Hatch won re-election to a sixth term over Democrat Pete Ashdown, the founder and CEO of Utah's oldest Internet service provider, XMission.

Utah general election
Party	Candidate	Votes	%	±%
Republican	Orrin Hatch (Incumbent)	356,238	62.36%	−3.22%
Democratic	Pete Ashdown	177,459	31.06%	−0.45%
Constitution	Scott Bradley	21,526	3.77%	
Personal Choice	Roger Price	9,089	1.59%	
Libertarian	Dave Seely	4,428	0.78%	−1.35%
Green	Julian Hatch	2,512	0.44%	
Majority		178,779	31.30%	−2.77%
Turnout		571,252		
Republican hold		Swing		

Hatch won all but one county with 60% to 70% of the vote. Ashdown won the remaining one county by 342 votes.

== Vermont ==
Vermont election
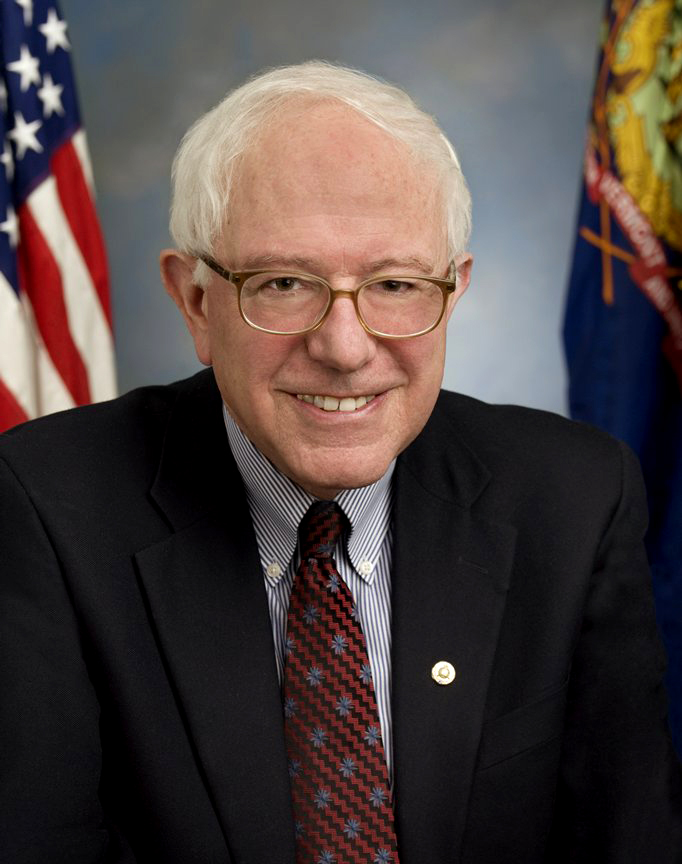

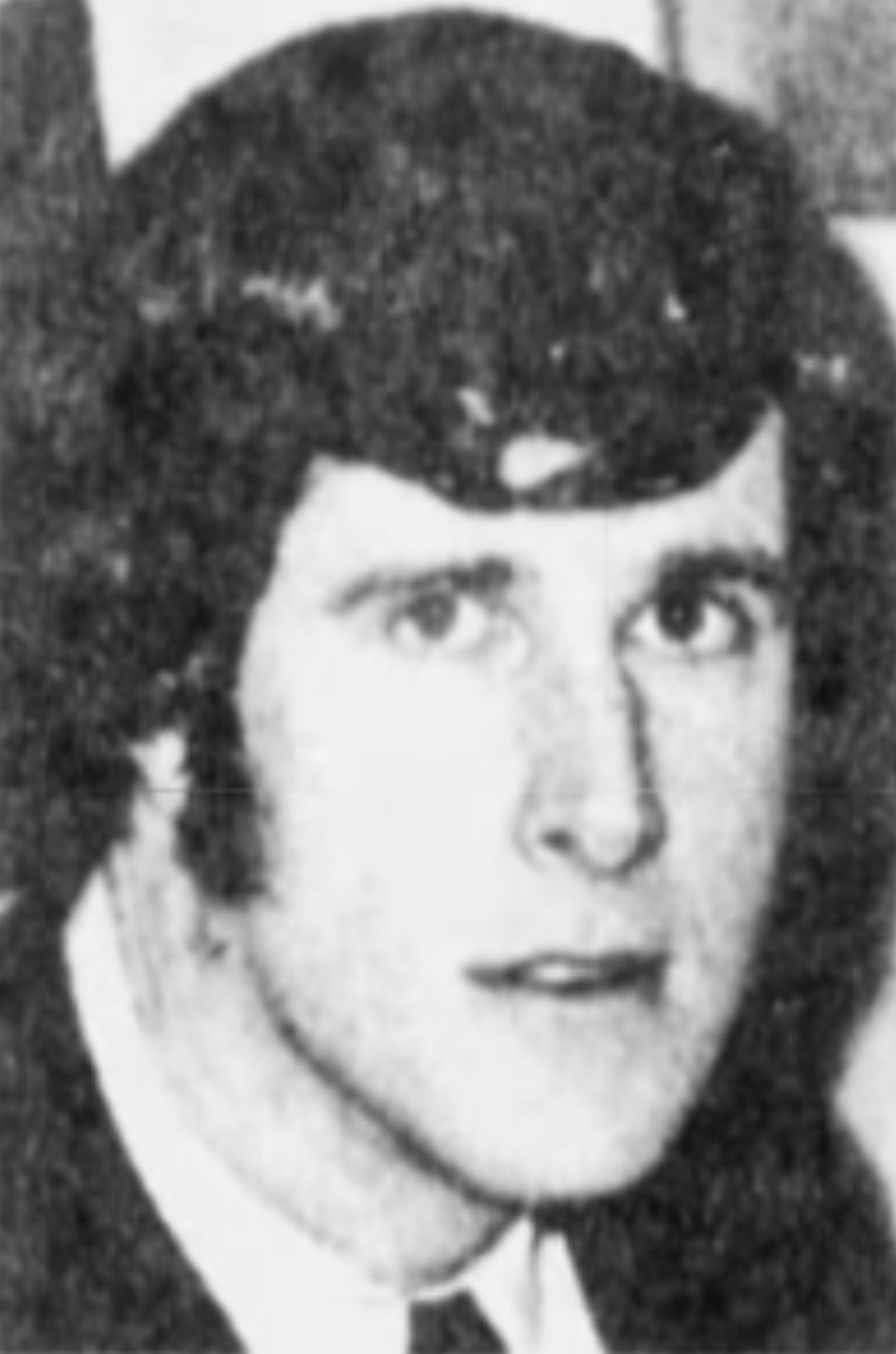
Nominee	Bernie Sanders	Richard Tarrant
Party	Independent	Republican
Popular vote	171,638	84,924
Percentage	65.4%	32.3%
- Sanders: 40–50% 50–60% 60–70% 70–80% 80–90% Tarrant: 50–60% Tie: 40–50%
U.S. senator before election
Jim Jeffords
Independent
Elected U.S. Senator
Bernie Sanders
Independent

Incumbent Independent Jim Jeffords decided to retire rather than seek re-election to a fourth term in office and Bernie Sanders was elected to succeed him over Republican businessman Richard Tarrant.

Sanders represented Vermont's at-large House district as an independent, won the Democratic primary and then dropped out to run as an independent. Many Democratic politicians across the country endorsed Sanders, and no Democrat was on the ballot. The state committee of the Vermont Democratic Party voted unanimously to endorse Sanders. Sanders won the open seat with 65% of the vote.

Four candidates ran in the Democratic primary. Sanders won the primary, but declined the nomination, leaving no Democratic nominee on the ballot. This victory ensured that no Democrat would appear on the general election ballot to split the vote with Sanders, an ally of the Democrats, who has been supported by leaders in the Democratic Party.

In mid-August 2006, the campaign heated up considerably, with Tarrant fully engaged in heavy media advertising, most of which criticized Sanders's public stances. Tarrant ran several ads accusing Sanders of representing himself differently from his voting record in the House of Representatives, citing such examples as Sanders's votes against Amber alert and against increased penalties for child pornography. Sanders responded with an ad stating that Tarrant's claims are "dishonest" and "distort my record" and presented what he viewed as more accurate explanations of his voting record.

Vermont general election
Party	Candidate	Votes	%	±%
Independent	Bernie Sanders	171,638	65.4%	n/a
Republican	Richard Tarrant	84,924	32.3%	−33.2%
Independent	Cris Ericson	1,735	0.66%	n/a
Green	Craig Hill	1,536	0.59%	n/a
Independent	Peter D. Moss	1,518	0.58%	n/a
Liberty Union	Peter Diamondstone	801	0.31%	−0.2%
Write-ins		267	0.10%	0%
Majority		86,741	33.1%	
Turnout		262,419	100%	
Independent hold		Swing		

Sanders won a majority of the votes in every county in the state, with 57% as his lowest county total.

== Virginia ==
Virginia election
- Turnout: 44.0% (voting eligible)
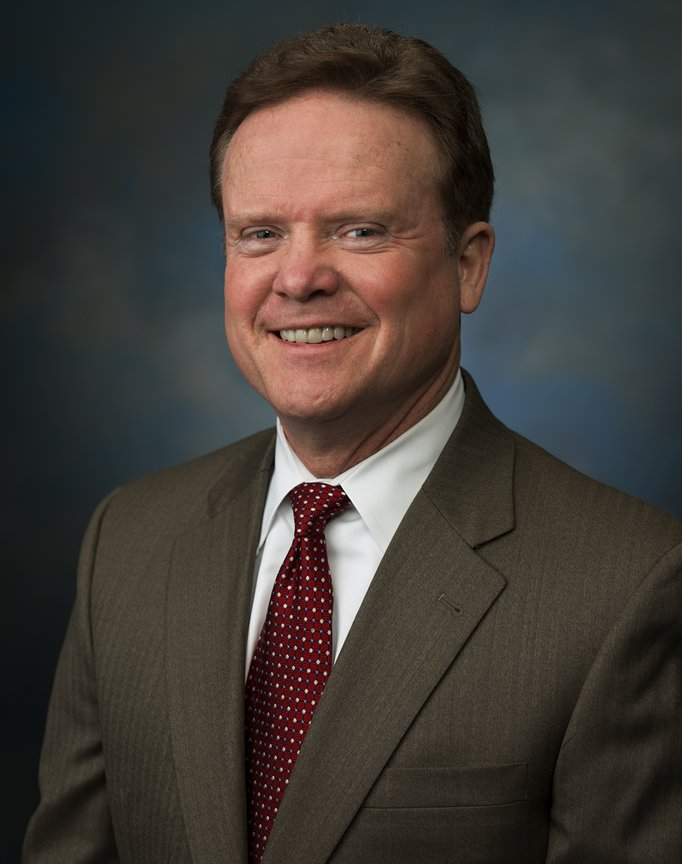

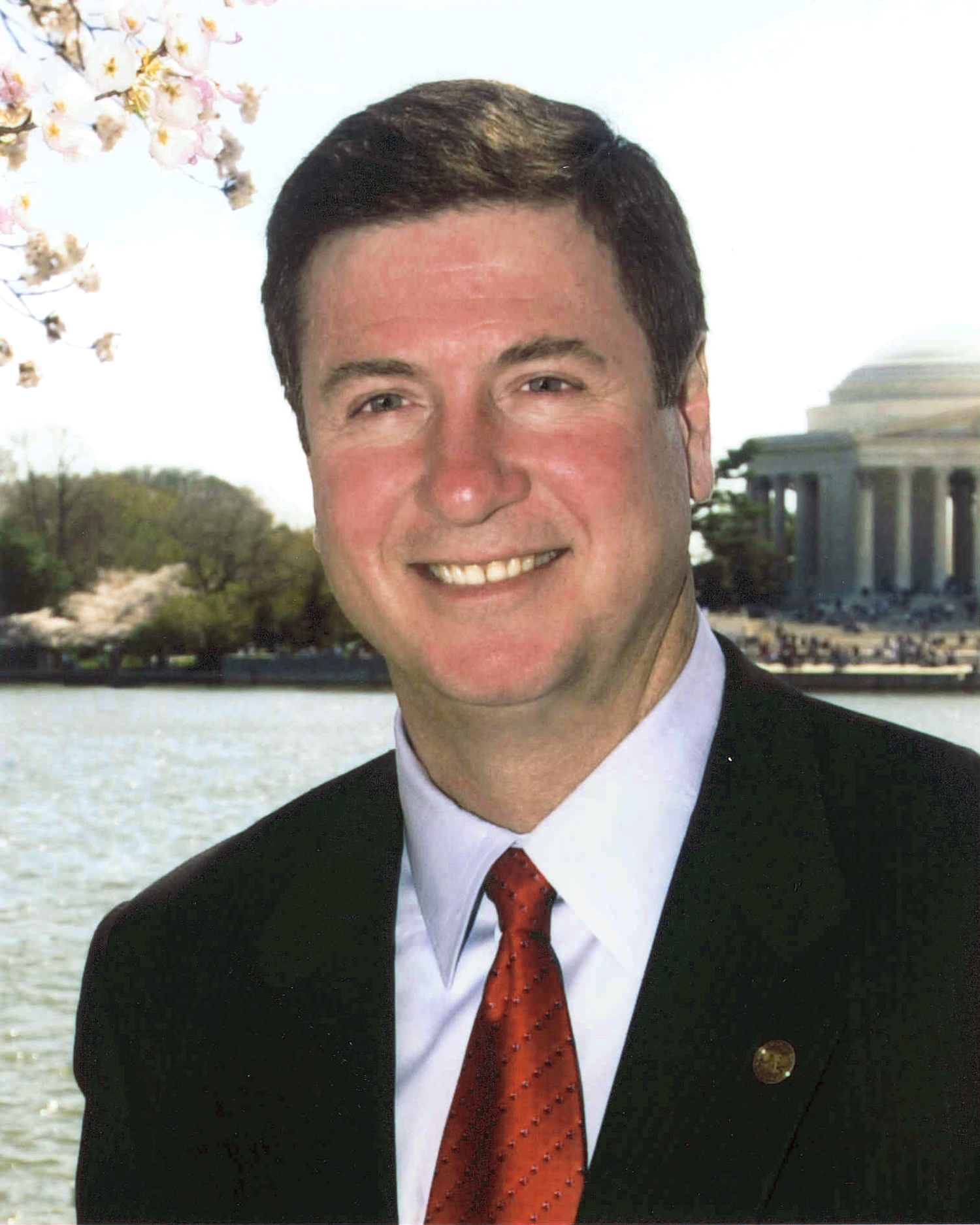
Nominee	Jim Webb	George Allen
Party	Democratic	Republican
Popular vote	1,175,606	1,166,277
Percentage	49.6%	49.2%
- Webb: 40–50% 50–60% 60–70% 70–80% Allen: 40–50% 50–60% 60–70% 70–80%
U.S. senator before election
George Allen
Republican
Elected U.S. Senator
Jim Webb
Democratic

Incumbent Republican George Allen ran for re-election to a second term, but lost in a narrow race to Democrat Jim Webb.

Allen, who previously served as Governor of Virginia and was considered a possible candidate for president in 2008, was running for his second term. Webb, a decorated Vietnam War veteran, writer and former Secretary of the Navy under Ronald Reagan won the Democratic nomination after being drafted by netroots activists, such as those at the blog Raising Kaine. Polls clearly favored Allen through mid-August, when he was caught on videotape on August 11 twice using an ethnic slur in reference to a Webb campaign volunteer, S.R. Sidarth, who is of Indian ancestry. Allen denied any prejudice in the comment, but his lead shrank considerably. Still, he led in most polls until late October, when several surveys showed Webb with a lead — mostly within the margin of error. The election was not decided until nearly 48 hours after the polls closed, when Allen, behind by a margin of about 0.3%, conceded on November 9, 2006. With all of the other Senate races decided, the outcome swung control of the Senate to the Democrats.

The week before the primary, businessman Harris Miller said a Webb campaign flier characterized him in an anti-Semitic way; Webb denied that it did.

Democratic primary
Party	Candidate	Votes	%
Democratic	Jim Webb	83,298	53.47%
Democratic	Harris Miller	72,486	46.53%
Total votes		155,784	100.00%

Webb focused on his early and outspoken opposition to the war in Iraq, which Allen supported. In a September 4, 2002, opinion piece in The Washington Post, Webb wrote: "A long-term occupation of Iraq would beyond doubt require an adjustment of force levels elsewhere, and could eventually diminish American influence in other parts of the world." Webb's son, a U.S. Marine, served in Iraq.

Allen and Webb differed on other issues. Allen is anti-abortion; Webb supports abortion rights. Allen supported George W. Bush's tax cuts while Webb said more of the benefits should have gone to middle-class Americans. Both candidates supported the death penalty, right-to-work laws, and Second Amendment rights.

Virginia general election
Party	Candidate	Votes	%	±%
Democratic	Jim Webb	1,175,606	49.59%	+1.91%
Republican	George Allen (Incumbent)	1,166,277	49.20%	−3.05%
Independent Greens	Gail Parker	26,102	1.10%	+1.10%
Write-ins		2,460	0.10%	+0.04%
Plurality		9,329	0.39%	-4.19%
Turnout		2,370,445		
Democratic gain from Republican		Swing		

Virginia has historically been one of the more Republican Southern states: for instance it was the only Southern state not to vote for Jimmy Carter in 1976, its congressional delegation was mostly conservative, with eight of eleven Congressmen and both Senators belonging to the Republican Party prior to the 2006 election. This made Virginia's Congressional delegation the most Republican of any Southern state. Despite this, Democrats had won the previous two gubernatorial races, in 2001 and 2005. The state's political majority has been changing from conservative white to a mixture of races, especially Hispanic. The state is increasingly diverse; it had the highest percentage of Asians (4.7%, according to the 2005 American Community Survey of the U.S. census) of any Southern state. 9.9% of Virginians are foreign-born. Webb, like Governor Tim Kaine in 2005, won the four major fast-growing counties in Northern Virginia outside Washington, D.C.; Fairfax, Loudoun, Prince William and Arlington. President Barack Obama carried Virginia by a 6.3% margin over Republican Senator John McCain.

When results began coming in, Allen quickly built a sizeable lead, which began to narrow as the night went on. With 90% of precincts reporting, Allen held a lead of about 30,000 votes , or about 1.5%. However, as votes began to come in from population-heavy Richmond, Webb narrowed the gap, and pulled ahead within the last 1 or 2% of precincts to report. Preliminary results showed Webb holding a lead of 8,942 votes, and many news organizations hesitated to call the election for either candidate until the next day. At 8:41 pm EST on November 8, AP declared Webb the winner. In all Virginia elections, if the margin of defeat is less than half of a percentage point, the Commonwealth of Virginia allows the apparent losing candidate to request a recount, paid for by the local jurisdictions. If the margin of defeat is between one and one-half of a percentage point, the losing candidate is still entitled to request a recount, but must cover its expense. Because the difference was less than 0.5%, George Allen could have requested a recount paid for by the government, but declined to make such a request. That was likely because:

- Even in large jurisdictions, recounts — such as those in Florida in 2000 and Washington's 2004 gubernatorial election — rarely result in a swing of more than 1,000 votes, and Allen was trailing by almost 10,000 in the initial count. In particular, almost all votes in this Virginia election were cast using electronic voting machines, whose results are unlikely to change in a recount.
- There was wide speculation that calling for a recount (and still losing) would give Allen a "sore loser" label, which would hurt his future election campaigns, including what some speculated might still involve a 2008 presidential run. However, after losing the senatorial election, on December 10, 2006, Allen announced that he would not be running for president in 2008.

== Washington ==
Washington election
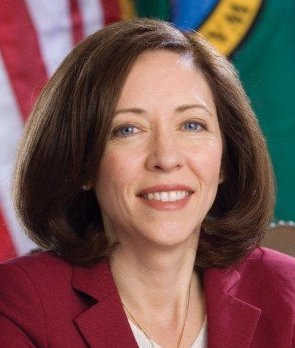

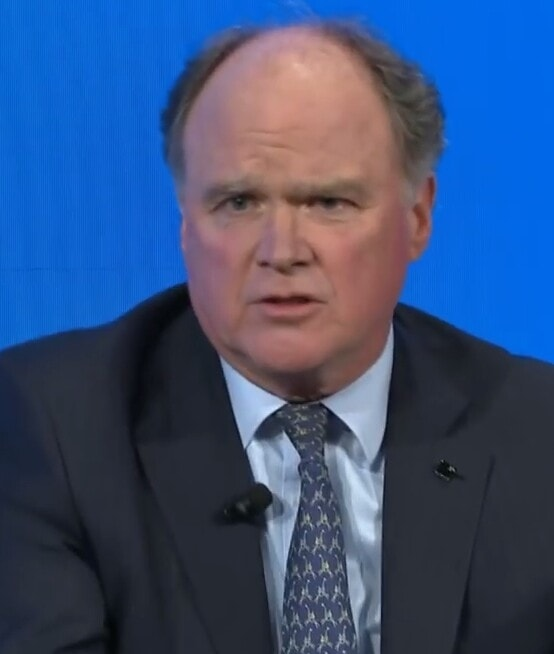
Nominee	Maria Cantwell	Mike McGavick
Party	Democratic	Republican
Popular vote	1,184,659	832,106
Percentage	56.9%	39.9%
- County results Cantwell: 40–50% 50–60% 60–70% McGavick: 40–50% 50–60% 60–70%
U.S. senator before election
Maria Cantwell
Democratic
Elected U.S. Senator
Maria Cantwell
Democratic

Incumbent Democrat Maria Cantwell won re-election to a second term.

The filing deadline was July 28, 2006, with the primary held September 19, 2006. Cantwell consistently led in polling throughout the race, although political analysts saw her as vulnerable this election cycle due to her extremely narrow win in 2000 and discontent among progressive voters. In November, The National Journal ranked Cantwell's seat as number 13 of the top 20 races to watch based on the likelihood of switching party control, and the third-highest Democratic seat likely to flip. However, in an election marked by discontent over the Republican leadership in D.C., Cantwell easily won by a 17% margin of victory.

Statewide politics in Washington had been dominated by the Democratic Party for many years. The governor, lieutenant governor, treasurer, state auditor, and insurance commissioner were all Democrats, while only secretary of state, attorney general, and commissioner of public lands were Republican. Of the nine representatives Washington sent to the House of Representatives, six were Democrats. Democrat Patty Murray was the state's senior senator. Cantwell won her initial election to the Senate in 2000 over Slade Gorton by 2,229 votes. Due to the closeness of that race, and the close gubernatorial contest between Democrat Christine Gregoire and Republican Dino Rossi in November 2004, many Republicans believed they had a strong chance of capturing Cantwell's seat in 2006.

On March 9, 2006, Aaron Dixon announced his decision to seek the Green Party's nomination for U.S. Senate, challenging Cantwell on her continued support for the U.S. presence in Iraq and the USA PATRIOT Act. On May 13, 2006, Mr. Dixon secured the party's nomination at the Green Party of Washington state's Spring Convention.

Initially, Cantwell had two challengers from within the Democratic primary, both of them taking strong stances against the Iraq war that brought attention to Cantwell's votes for the Iraq Resolution and against a timeline for withdrawal. Three other Democrats also entered the primary race.

On August 8, 2006, the incumbent Democratic Senator from Connecticut, Joe Lieberman, lost his primary race to challenger Ned Lamont by 52%-48%, and then ran as an independent in the general election. A great deal of attention was focused on this race as an early barometer of both anti-incumbent and anti-war sentiment nationwide. Comparisons were made between Lieberman's troubles and Cantwell's re-election bid, citing Cantwell's vote in favor of the Iraq Resolution that led to the war, her refusal to say she regretted the vote, and her vote against a timetable for withdrawal.

Unlike Lamont's campaign, Cantwell's anti-war opponents' campaigns received much less funding and did not have the same support from the blogosphere that brought Lamont to prominence and improved his name recognition. Also, unlike Lieberman, Cantwell altered her position on the war during her campaign and criticized the Bush Administration for its conduct of the war. She also hired her most vocal anti-war primary opponent, Mark Wilson, at $8,000-a-month salary, a move that was described by political commentators as "buying out" the opposition (which she also allegedly attempted with other anti-war challengers Hong Tran and Aaron Dixon). The article noted that, despite the differences in exact circumstances, the Lieberman defeat also showed that voters were in an anti-incumbent mood, which could've created problems for Cantwell. This was supported by another P-I article that also noted that the primary loss of Lieberman and two House incumbents, Michigan Republican Joe Schwarz and Georgia Democrat Cynthia McKinney, on the same day indicated that there may have been a nationwide anti-incumbent trend.

Following the primary results, Cantwell endorsed Ned Lamont and McGavick responded by endorsing Senator Lieberman. The Dixon campaign released a statement criticizing Cantwell's "spin and vague rhetoric" on the war, and equating her current position to a pro-war stance similar to Lieberman's.

On August 14, less than a week after Lamont's win and nearly four years after the actual event, Cantwell for the first time said she would have voted against the authorization to use force in Iraq if she knew then what she knew in 2006. However, she did so only after hearing her opponent McGavick say that he would have voted against the authorization under those conditions. Cantwell has stated that she had no regrets for her vote in favor of the authorization.

On July 9, anti-war challenger Mark Wilson announced he would abandon his bid, endorse Cantwell, and take a paid position offered by Cantwell's campaign, one day after progressive activist and anti-war critic Dal LaMagna had been hired to be the Cantwell campaign's co-chair. Initially, Cantwell's campaign refused to state how much they were paying Wilson, but under pressure from the media, disclosed that he was receiving $8,000 per month, only slightly less than Cantwell's campaign manager Matt Butler, who earns $8,731 per month. The next day, Hong Tran received a call from LaMagna saying they would like her to join their campaign, in a context that she interpreted as a job offer, which she refused. Political commentators, including those at the Seattle Post Intelligencer and one at The Washington Times, expressed their views that Cantwell was attempting to eliminate the viable options anti-war Democrats had to voice their opinion on the war in the upcoming primary by having Wilson join her campaign and then soliciting Tran.

Wilson's supporters and journalists expressed surprise at his withdrawal from the race after a 16-month campaign, where he was a sharp critic of the incumbent Senator, who he referred to on his campaign website as a "free-trading corporate elitist" who "bought her seat", then "alienated and alarmed" her base. When asked by reporters if he still believed what he said about Cantwell during his primary bid, he stated: "I believed in it to a point in order to capitalize on what was already existent, which was a rift within the Democratic Party over the issue of the war." Both Dixon and Tran publicly doubted that Wilson's apparent change of heart was genuine, citing his paid position with the campaign and his initial refusal to disclose his salary.

On September 25, Joshua Frank reported that Dixon was alleging that he had been contacted twice in July by Mark Wilson, who implied that large donations to Dixon's non-profit organization, Central House, would be made if he were to withdraw his candidacy before filing. Dixon also claimed that Wilson was not the only Cantwell staffer to contact him, but declined to disclose who the other staff was. Dixon also made this claim on a Democracy Now! broadcast. David Postman of the Seattle Times contacted the Cantwell campaign about the allegations; their spokesperson didn't say it didn't happen but stated that no one on the campaign had been authorized to speak to Dixon about his campaign. The campaign did not allow access to Wilson so he could respond as to whether the conversation took place. Other reporters also had trouble contacting Wilson; Susan Paynter of the Seattle P-I, in an article on his shunning of the media, noted that there had been a widespread assumption after Wilson's hire that the intent was to silence him and that his disappearance only reinforced this assumption, calling it "the political equivalent of a farm subsidy." Paynter also quoted Hong Tran as saying that the reaction to Wilson's initial appearances on the campaign trail after he had joined Cantwell were so negative that she was not surprised he disappeared.

On September 19, after her defeat in the Democratic primary, Hong Tran lamented to the Seattle Times of "how undemocratic the Democratic Party really is" saying the state Democratic party had tried to keep her from getting attention, forbidding her from putting up signs at Coordinated Campaign events and not giving her access to the state party voter rolls. Cantwell, whose campaign hired two of her early critics, had also refused to debate Tran. When asked before the primary whether she would endorse the senator if her primary bid proved unsuccessful, Tran had responded, "certainly not."

Democratic primary
Party	Candidate	Votes	%	±%
Democratic	Maria Cantwell (Incumbent)	570,677	90.76%	N/A
Democratic	Hong Tran	33,124	5.27%	N/A
Democratic	Mike The Mover	11,274	1.79%	N/A
Democratic	Michael Goodspaceguy Nelson	9,454	1.50%	N/A
Democratic	Mohammad H. Said	4,222	0.67%	N/A

From the Washington Secretary of State

In early hypothetical matchups in 2005 compiled by conservative pollster Strategic Vision, Rossi led Cantwell. Republican leadership reportedly pleaded with Rossi to jump into the ring. Rossi declined.

Speculation next centered on Rick White (who had taken Cantwell's House seat in 1994), state GOP chair Chris Vance, former Seattle television reporter Susan Hutchison, and former 8th district Congressional candidate and Republican National Committee member Diane Tebelius. None of those chose to enter the race. Republican leaders finally got behind former Safeco Insurance CEO Mike McGavick.

Republican primary
Party	Candidate	Votes	%	±%
Republican	Mike McGavick	397,524	85.88%	N/A
Republican	Brad Klippert	32,213	6.96%	N/A
Republican	Warren E. Hanson	17,881	3.86%	N/A
Republican	B. Barry Massoudi	6,410	1.38%	N/A
Republican	Gordon Allen Pross	5,196	1.12%	N/A
Republican	William Edward Chovil	3,670	0.79%	N/A

Cantwell was projected to be the winner right when the polls closed at 11:00 p.m. EST Time.

2006 United States Senate election in Washington
Party	Candidate	Votes	%	±%
Democratic	Maria Cantwell (incumbent)	1,184,659	56.85%	+8.12
Republican	Mike McGavick	832,106	39.93%	−8.71
Libertarian	Bruce Guthrie	29,331	1.41%	−1.22
Green	Aaron Dixon	21,254	1.02%	N/A
Independent	Robin Adair	16,384	0.79%	N/A
Total votes		2,083,734	100.00%	N/A
Democratic hold				

== West Virginia ==
West Virginia election
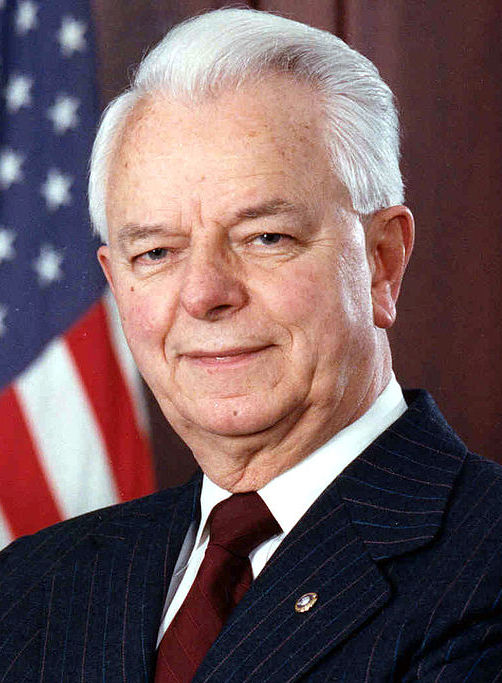

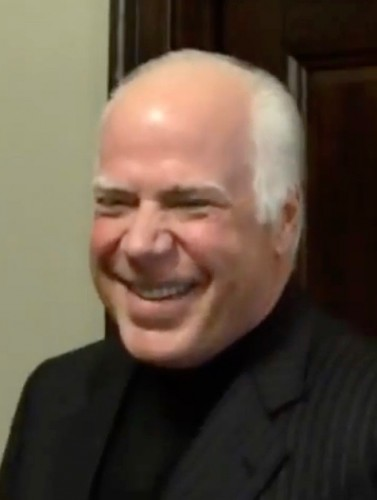
Nominee	Robert Byrd	John Raese
Party	Democratic	Republican
Popular vote	296,276	155,043
Percentage	64.4%	33.7%
- County results Byrd: 40–50% 50–60% 60–70% 70–80% 80–90% Raese: 50–60%
U.S. senator before election
Robert Byrd
Democratic
Elected U.S. Senator
Robert Byrd
Democratic

Incumbent Democrat Robert Byrd won re-election to a ninth term. He was sworn in on January 4, 2007.

Before the 2000 presidential election, West Virginia had been won by the Democratic nominee every time since 1932 (except for the Republican landslides of 1956, 1972, and 1984). In 2000, then Republican Governor George W. Bush of Texas won West Virginia's five electoral college votes over then Vice President Al Gore of Tennessee by a margin of 52–46. Also in the 2000 election, Republican Shelley Moore Capito, the daughter of Former West Virginia Governor Arch A. Moore, Jr., won a surprise victory over Democrat Jim Humphreys for West Virginia's 2nd Congressional District seat to the United States House of Representatives. She would become the first Republican in West Virginia to hold a Congressional office for more than one term since her father in 1969. Before these two major victories for national and West Virginia Republicans, it was difficult to find a Republican who could mount a formidable campaign against Democrats running for public office in West Virginia.

President Bush won West Virginia again in the 2004 presidential election over John F. Kerry, the Democratic junior Senator from Massachusetts by a margin of 56–43. Both Representative Alan Mollohan (D-1st District) and Representative Nick Rahall (D-3rd District) had more formidable challenges from Republicans when compared to 2000 and 2002. Republican Brent Benjamin defeated Democratic incumbent West Virginia Supreme Court of Appeals Justice Warren McGraw, and Republican Betty Ireland defeated liberal-Democrat Ken Hechler, a former congressman and secretary of state, for West Virginia Secretary of State.

Since 2000, the Republicans had gained seven net seats in both the West Virginia Senate and the West Virginia House of Delegates. However, the Democrats held 60% of the seats in the Senate and 68% of the seats in the House.

Along with continued majorities in the legislature, Democrats also had some other victories. Even though both Bush and Capito won their respective offices in 2000, Senator Byrd sailed to an eighth term with 78% of the vote over Republican David Gallaher. Senator John D. Rockefeller, IV easily won a fourth term to the Senate in 2002 by a margin of 63–37 over Republican Jay Wolfe. In 2000, 2002, and 2004, both Representative Mollohan and Representative Rahall were re-elected by much stronger margins than Capito. In 2004, Republican Monty Warner failed to defeat Democratic West Virginia Secretary of State Joe Manchin for governor.

After the Republicans failed to win the governor's race, West Virginia Republican Committee Chairman Kris Warner, the brother of Monty, was put under pressure to resign his post; he did so in May 2005. Wheeling attorney Rob Capehart took his place. (Dr. Doug McKinney of Bridgeport was the next to hold the post.) Another brother of Monty, Kasey, who was appointed by President Bush in 2001, was removed as the United States Attorney for the Southern District of West Virginia on August 1, 2005. No explanation has been given for his departure and First Assistant U.S. Attorney Charles T. Miller currently represents the district.

Democratic primary
Party	Candidate	Votes	%	±%
Democratic	Robert Byrd (Incumbent)	159,154	85.7%	
Democratic	Billy Hendricks, Jr.	26,609	14.3%	

Both state and national Republicans chose Shelley Moore Capito as their first choice to challenge Byrd. Early polling showed Byrd with only around a ten-point lead. Capito had even met with National Republican Senatorial Committee (NRSC) Chairwoman Elizabeth Dole, whose husband, Bob Dole, served alongside Byrd as majority and minority leader in the Senate, to discuss a possible run. Despite party leaders pushing for her to run, on October 3, 2005, Capito announced she would seek a fourth term for her congressional seat rather than run against Byrd. She cited the negativity of a possible Byrd-Capito race as a reason for not running. Other reasons for Capito not running include the following: Capito's seat is widely considered safe; Capito is rising in House leadership; if Capito ran against Byrd, her seat could possibly have fallen back into the Democratic column; and Capito's large amount of contributions from former House Majority Leader Tom DeLay could be brought into question.

After Capito decided not to run, Republicans hoped to recruit Secretary of State Betty Ireland, the first woman elected to the executive branch of West Virginia. On October 27, 2005, however, Ireland announced she would not run against the eight-term senator. She said that the office of Secretary of State should not be used as a political stepping stone. Ironically, Joe Manchin held the office of Secretary of State during his campaign for governor.

Conservative columnist Robert Novak wrote in a September 24, 2005, article that Gale Catlett's, the former head coach of the West Virginia University Men's Basketball team, name had been floated around as a possible challenger to Byrd. Catlett had in fact talked to West Virginia Republican Committee Chairman Capehart about either running against Byrd or possibly Representative Mollohan. It was also reported that if Capito had run against Byrd, Catlett would seek her seat. However, on November 11, 2005, Catlett decided not to run against Senator Byrd or Representative Mollohan. (A side note: On November 12, 2005, Ohio County Delegate Chris Wakim (R) announced his intentions to run against Representative Mollohan.)

On January 11, 2006, TheHill.com reported that NRSC Chairwoman Dole met with John Raese, the 1984 Republican United States Senate candidate and 1988 Republican Gubernatorial primary-candidate to discuss a possible run for the nomination in May. Raese did file for the primary by the deadline of January 28, 2006.

Republican primary
Party	Candidate	Votes	%	±%
Republican	John Raese	47,408	58.3%	
Republican	Hiram Lewis	18,496	22.7%	
Republican	Rick Snuffer	4,870	6.0%	
Republican	Charles G. "Bud" Railey	4,364	5.4%	
Republican	Paul J. Brown	3,464	4.3%	
Republican	Zane Lawhorn	2,723	3.3%	

Byrd was extremely popular as he had approval ratings in the low 60% range. Raese, a millionaire, self-financed his campaign. He spent campaign ads on attacking Byrd.

West Virginia general election
Party	Candidate	Votes	%	±%
Democratic	Robert Byrd (Incumbent)	296,276	64.4%	−13.3%
Republican	John Raese	155,043	33.7%	+13.56%
Mountain	Jesse Johnson	8,565	1.9%	n/a
Majority		141,233	30.7%	−26.9%
Turnout		459,884	40.4%	−21.5%
Democratic hold		Swing		

== Wisconsin ==
Wisconsin election
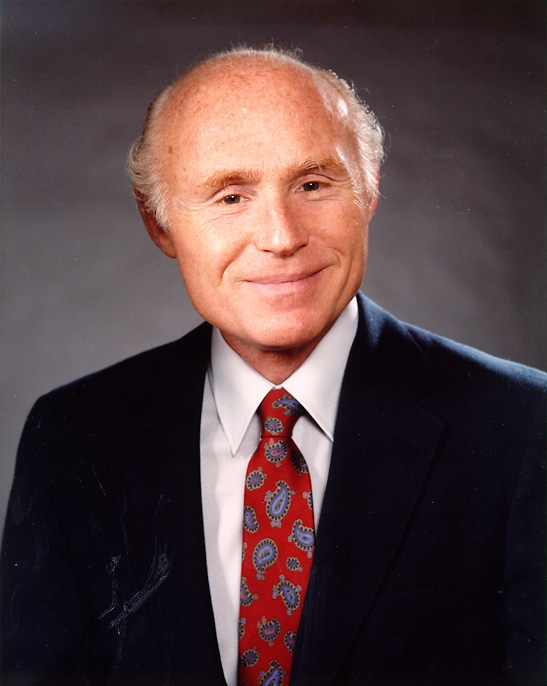

Nominee	Herb Kohl	Robert Lorge
Party	Democratic	Republican
Popular vote	1,439,214	630,299
Percentage	67.3%	29.5%
- Kohl: 50–60% 60–70% 70–80% >90%
U.S. senator before election
Herb Kohl
Democratic
Elected U.S. Senator
Herb Kohl
Democratic

Incumbent Democrat Herb Kohl won re-election to a fourth term.

2006 Wisconsin United States Senate Election Democratic Primary
Party	Candidate	Votes	%	±%
Democratic	Herb Kohl (Incumbent)	308,178	85.66%	
Democratic	Ben Masel	51,245	14.24%	
Democratic Party	Other	335	0.09%	

2006 Wisconsin United States Senate Election Republican Primary
Party	Candidate	Votes	%	±%
Republican	Robert Lorge	194,633	99.73%	
Republican Party	Other	530	0.27%	

Robert Lorge was the Republican candidate for the seat after being the only Republican candidate to file before the filing deadline on July 11, 2006. Despite receiving no money or support from the State or National Republican party he fared better than Republican Senate candidates in New York, Massachusetts, North Dakota, and was the only major party candidate in 2006 able to deliver votes for under $1 in the Post McCain-Feingold Campaign Finance Law era.

Wisconsin general election
Party	Candidate	Votes	%	±%
Democratic	Herb Kohl (Incumbent)	1,439,214	67.31%	+5.8%
Republican	Robert Lorge	630,299	29.48%	−7.5%
Green	Rae Vogeler	42,434	1.98%	n/a
Independent	Ben Glatzel	25,096	1.17%	n/a
Other	Scattered	1,254	0.06%	n/a
Majority		808,915	37.83%	
Turnout		2,138,297	50.86%	
Democratic hold		Swing		

Kohl won a majority in every county in the state. Kohl's weakest performance in the state was suburban Washington County, Wisconsin, which Kohl won with just 49.6%. Kohl's strongest performance was in rural Menominee County, where he won with over 90% of the vote. Vogeler's best performance was in Dane County, where she came in third place with over 5%, a county where Lorge had his second weakest performance.

== Wyoming ==
Wyoming election
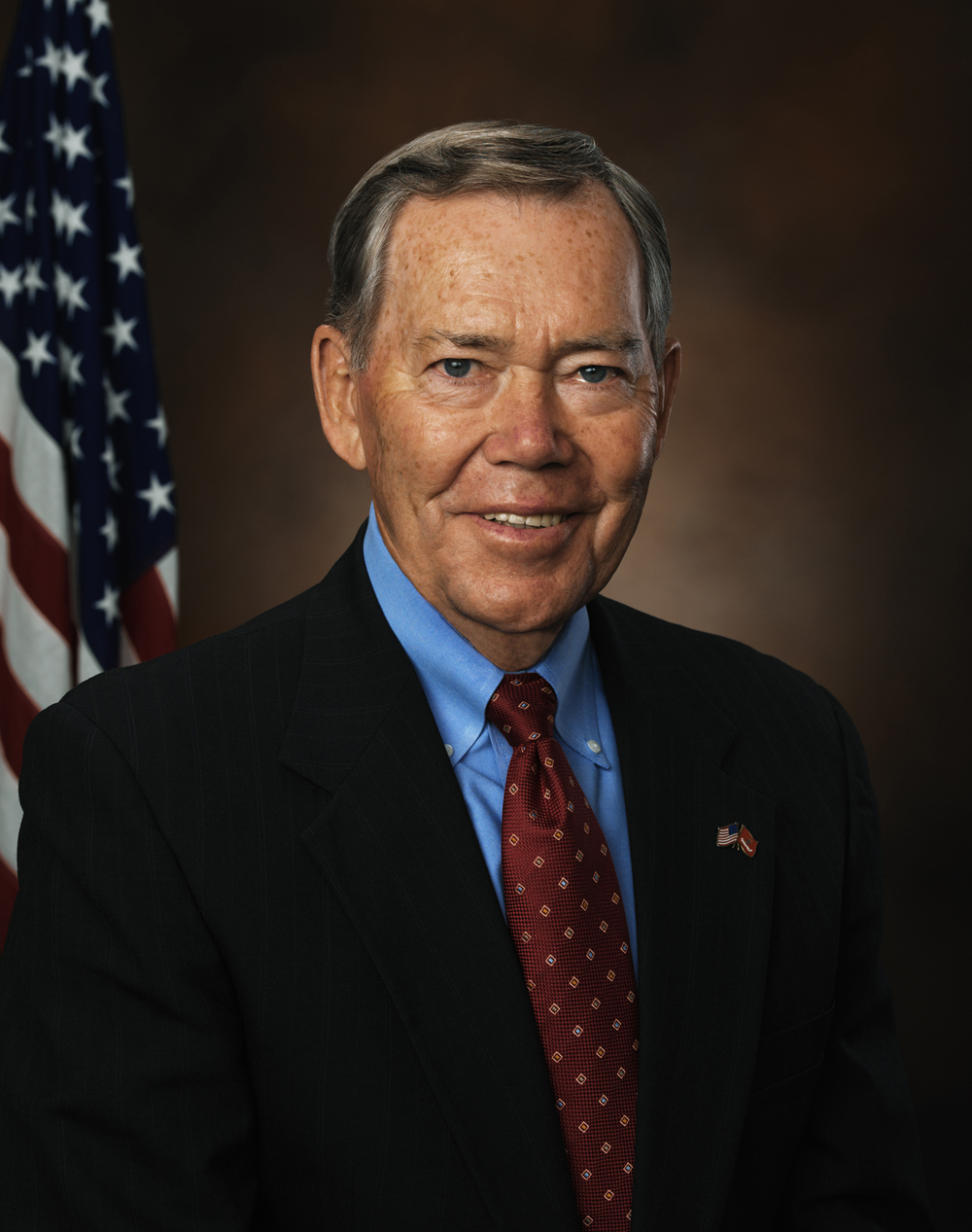

Nominee	Craig L. Thomas	Dale Groutage
Party	Republican	Democratic
Popular vote	135,174	57,761
Percentage	70.0%	29.9%
- County results Thomas: 50–60% 60–70% 70–80% 80–90%
U.S. senator before election
Craig L. Thomas
Republican
Elected U.S. Senator
Craig L. Thomas
Republican

Incumbent Republican Craig Thomas won re-election to a third term. Thomas died 5 months into his term on June 4, 2007, after battling leukemia.

Democratic primary
Party	Candidate	Votes	%
Democratic	Dale Groutage	24,924	100.00%
Total votes		24,924	100.00%

Republican primary
Party	Candidate	Votes	%
Republican	Craig Thomas (Incumbent)	78,211	100.00%
Total votes		78,211	100.00%

Thomas was a very popular two term incumbent, having a 68% approval rating. Despite doing very well in the polls, Thomas agreed to a debate. An October debate was sponsored by the Casper Star-Tribune and KCWY in Casper. Thomas said the nation has made progress in its energy policy, while Groutage said the nation's energy policy has failed because Congress has done more for special interests than the people.

Wyoming general election
Party	Candidate	Votes	%	±%
Republican	Craig L. Thomas (Incumbent)	135,174	69.99%	−3.78%
Democratic	Dale Groutage	57,671	29.86%	+7.82%
	Write-ins	291	0.15%	
Majority		77,503	40.13%	−11.61%
Turnout		193,136		
Republican hold		Swing		

Thomas won at least 56% of the vote in every county in Wyoming.

== See also ==
- 2006 United States elections
  - 2006 United States gubernatorial elections
  - 2006 United States House of Representatives elections
- 109th United States Congress
- 110th United States Congress
