= 2006 United States Senate election in Washington =

- November 7, 2006
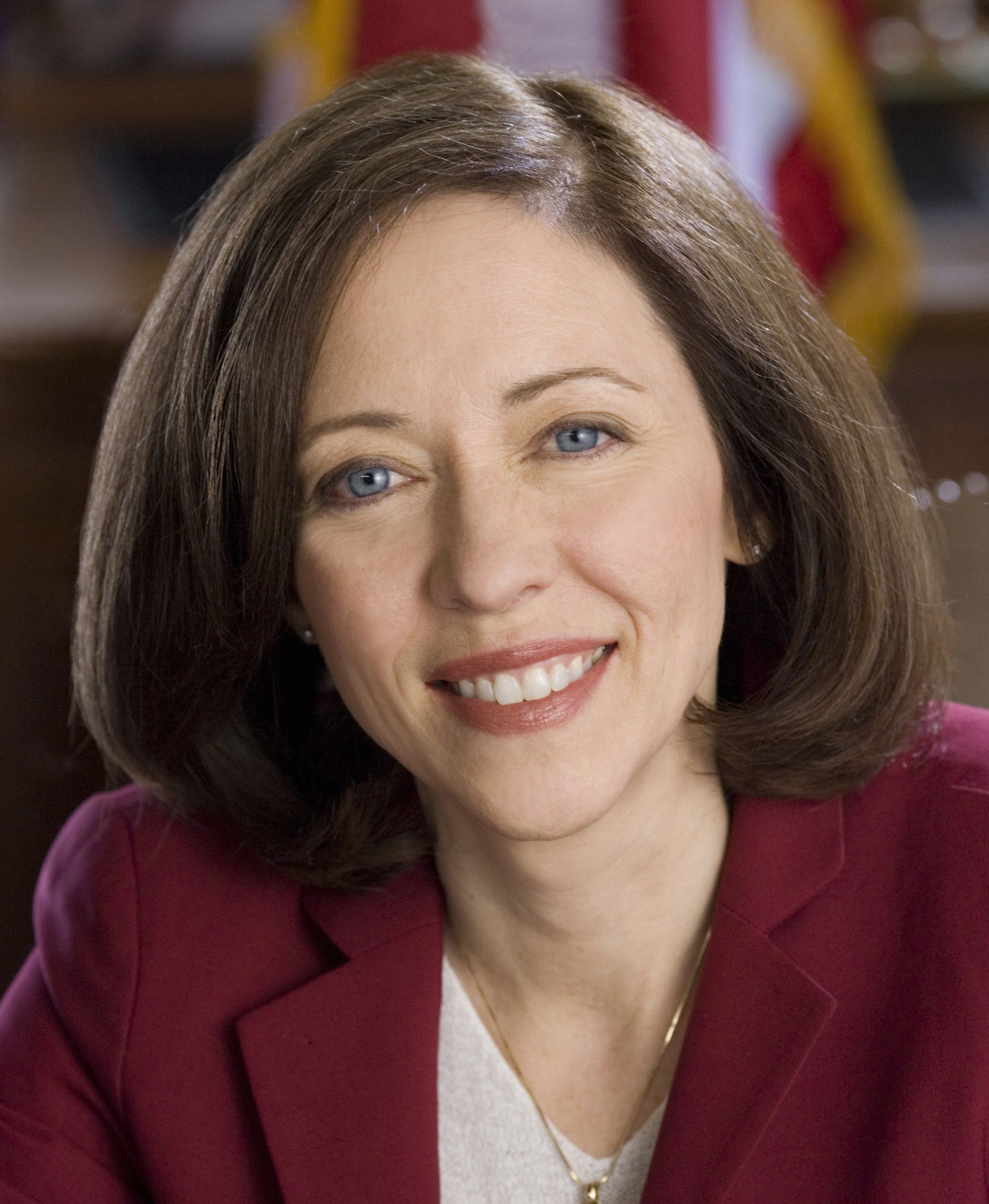

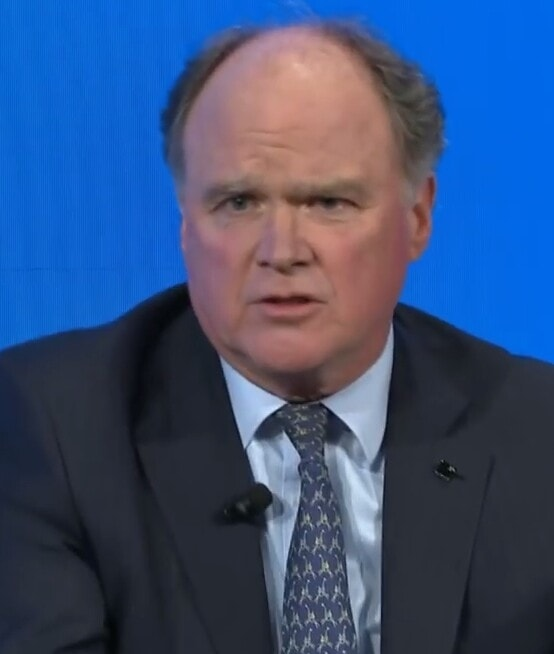
Nominee	Maria Cantwell	Mike McGavick
Party	Democratic	Republican
Popular vote	1,184,659	832,106
Percentage	56.85%	39.93%
- County results Cantwell: 40–50% 50–60% 60–70% McGavick: 40–50% 50–60% 60–70%
U.S. senator before election
Maria Cantwell
Democratic
Elected U.S. Senator
Maria Cantwell
Democratic

The 2006 United States Senate election in Washington was held November 7, 2006. Incumbent Democrat Maria Cantwell won reelection to a second term.

== Background ==
The filing deadline was July 28, 2006, with the primary held September 19, 2006. Cantwell consistently led in polling throughout the race, although political analysts saw her as vulnerable this election cycle due to her extremely narrow win in 2000 and discontent among progressive voters. In November, the National Journal ranked Cantwell's seat as number 13 of the top 20 races to watch based on the likelihood of switching party control, and the third-highest Democratic seat likely to flip. However, in an election marked by discontent over the Republican leadership in D.C., Cantwell easily won by a 17% margin of victory.

Statewide politics in Washington have been dominated by the Democratic Party for many years. The governor, lieutenant governor, state treasurer, state auditor, and insurance commissioner were Democrats, while only the secretary of state, attorney general, and commissioner of public lands were Republicans. Of the nine representatives Washington sent to the U.S. House of Representatives, six were Democrats. Democrat Patty Murray is the state's senior senator. Cantwell won her initial election to the Senate in 2000 over Slade Gorton by 2,229 votes. Due to the closeness of that race, and the close gubernatorial contest between Democrat Christine Gregoire and Republican Dino Rossi in November 2004, many Republicans believed they had a strong chance of capturing Cantwell's seat in 2006.

== Democratic primary ==
=== Candidates ===
- Maria Cantwell, incumbent U.S. senator
- Goodspaceguy (Michael Nelson), perennial candidate
- Mike The Mover, moving company owner and perennial candidate
- Mohammad Said, candidate for the U.S. Senate in 2004
- Hong Tran, attorney
- Mark Wilson, Libertarian candidate for Congress in 2002 and Green candidate for the U.S. Senate in 2004 (withdrew and took a paid position in Cantwell's campaign)

=== Campaign ===
On March 9, 2006, Aaron Dixon announced his decision to seek the Green Party's nomination for U.S. Senate, challenging Cantwell on her continued support for the U.S. presence in Iraq and the USA PATRIOT Act. On May 13, 2006, Dixon secured the party's nomination at the Green Party of Washington state's Spring Convention.

Initially, Cantwell had two challengers from within the Democratic primary, both of them taking strong stances against the Iraq war that brought attention to Cantwell's votes for the Iraq Resolution and against a timeline for withdrawal: Mark Wilson and Hong Tran. Three other Democrats also entered the primary race: Mike the Mover, Michael Goodspaceguy Nelson, and Mohammad H. Said.

On August 8, 2006, the incumbent Democratic senator from Connecticut, Joe Lieberman, lost his primary race to challenger Ned Lamont by 52%-48%, and appeared to be following through on his earlier commitment to run as an independent in the general election. A great deal of attention had focused on this race, as an early barometer of both anti-incumbent and anti-war sentiment nationwide. Comparisons were made between Lieberman's troubles and Cantwell's re-election bid, citing Cantwell's vote in favor of the Iraq Resolution that led to the war, her refusal to say she regretted the vote, and her vote against a timetable for withdrawal.

Unlike Lamont's campaign, Cantwell's anti-war opponents' campaigns received much less funding and did not have the same support from the blogosphere that brought Lamont to prominence and improved his name recognition. Also, unlike Lieberman, Cantwell altered her position on the war during her campaign and criticized the Bush administration for its conduct of the war. She also hired her most vocal anti-war primary opponent, Mark Wilson, at an $8,000-a-month salary, a move that was described by political commentators as "buying out" the opposition (which she also allegedly attempted with other anti-war challengers Hong Tran and Aaron Dixon). A P-I article does, however, note that, despite the differences in exact circumstances, the Lieberman defeat also showed that voters were in an anti-incumbent mood, which could create problems for Cantwell. This is supported by an AP article that also notes that the primary loss of Lieberman and two House incumbents, Michigan Republican Joe Schwarz and Georgia Democrat Cynthia McKinney, on the same day indicated that there might be a nationwide anti-incumbent trend.

Following the primary results, Cantwell endorsed Ned Lamont, and McGavick responded by endorsing Senator Lieberman. The Dixon campaign released a statement criticizing Cantwell's "spin and vague rhetoric" on the war, and equating her current position to a pro-war stance similar to Lieberman's.

On August 14, less than a week after Lamont's win and nearly four years after the actual event, Cantwell for the first time said she would have voted against the authorization to use force in Iraq if she knew then what she knows today. However, she did so only after hearing her opponent McGavick say that he would have voted against the authorization under those conditions. Cantwell stated that she had no regrets for her vote in favor of the authorization and did not change that position.

On July 9, anti-war challenger Mark Wilson announced he would abandon his bid, endorse Cantwell, and take a paid position offered by Cantwell's campaign, one day after progressive activist and anti-war critic Dal LaMagna was hired to be the Cantwell campaign's co-chair. Initially, Cantwell's campaign refused to state how much they were paying Wilson, but under pressure from the media, disclosed that he was receiving $8,000 per month, only slightly less than Cantwell's campaign manager Matt Butler, who earned $8,731 per month. The next day, Hong Tran received a call from LaMagna saying they would like her to join their campaign, in a context that she interpreted as a job offer, which she refused. Political commentators, including those at the Seattle Post-Intelligencer and one at The Washington Times, expressed their views that Cantwell was attempting to eliminate the viable options anti-war Democrats had to voice their opinion on the war in the upcoming primary by having Wilson join her campaign and then soliciting Tran.

Wilson's supporters and journalists expressed surprise at his withdrawal from the race after a 16-month campaign, where he was a sharp critic of the incumbent senator, who he referred to on his campaign website as a "free-trading corporate elitist" who "bought her seat", then "alienated and alarmed" her base. When asked by reporters if he still believed what he said about Cantwell during his primary bid, he stated: "I believed in it to a point in order to capitalize on what was already existent, which was a rift within the Democratic Party over the issue of the war." Both Dixon and Tran publicly doubted that Wilson's apparent change of heart was genuine, citing his paid position with the campaign and his initial refusal to disclose his salary.

On September 25, Joshua Frank reported that Dixon had alleged that he had been contacted twice in July by Mark Wilson, who implied that large donations to Dixon's non-profit organization, Central House, would be made if he were to withdraw his candidacy before filing. Dixon also claimed that Wilson was not the only Cantwell staffer to contact him, but declined to disclose who the other staffer was. Dixon also made this claim on a Democracy Now! broadcast. David Postman of the Seattle Times contacted the Cantwell campaign about the allegations; their spokesperson didn't say it didn't happen, but stated that no one on the campaign had been authorized to speak to Dixon about his campaign. The campaign did not allow access to Wilson so he could respond as to whether the conversation took place. Other reporters also had trouble contacting Wilson in recent weeks; Susan Paynter of the Seattle P-I, in an article on his shunning of the media, noted that there had been a widespread assumption after Wilson's hire that the intent was to silence him and that his disappearance only reinforced this assumption, calling it "the political equivalent of a farm subsidy." Paynter also quoted Hong Tran as saying that the reaction to Wilson's initial appearances on the campaign trail after he had joined Cantwell were so negative that she was not surprised he disappeared.

While some of Washington's legislative districts did not give endorsements for the primary election, Cantwell received the sole endorsement of at least 14 of the 49 legislative districts in the state. Hong Tran won the sole endorsement of one district, the 32nd (Cantwell's home district), and split dual endorsements with Cantwell in three others: the 40th, 25th, and 26th. Tran attended the endorsement meeting for the 32nd Legislative District in person and, according to one blogger who claims to have spoken to people who attended the meeting, made her positions clear and responded to questions. According to the blogger, Cantwell sent Mark Wilson in her stead, who was unable to defend Cantwell's votes in favor of the USA PATRIOT Act, NAFTA, CAFTA, and the Iraq War.

On September 19, after her defeat in the Democratic primary, Hong Tran lamented to the Seattle Times "how undemocratic the Democratic Party really is," saying the state Democratic party had tried to keep her from getting attention, forbidding her from putting up signs at Coordinated Campaign events and not giving her access to the state party voter rolls. Cantwell, whose campaign hired two of her early critics, had also refused to debate Tran. When asked before the primary whether she would endorse the senator if her primary bid proved unsuccessful, Tran had responded, "certainly not."

=== Polling and results ===
Candidate	SurveyUSA poll (August 11–13; ± 3 pct points)	Election results (initial data entry)		Election results (corrected)
Maria Cantwell (incumbent)	90%	570,677	90.7636%	568,935
Hong Tran	2%	33,124	5.2682%	33,097
Mike The Mover	0%	11,274	1.7931%	11,213
Michael Goodspaceguy Nelson	3%	9,454	1.5036%	9,389
Mohammad H. Said	2%	4,222	0.6715%	4,214
Undecided	3%	N/A	N/A	N/A
Total	405 Likely Democratic Primary Voters	[628,751]		[626,848]

== Republican primary ==
=== Background ===
In early hypothetical matchups in 2005 compiled by conservative pollster Strategic Vision, Rossi led Cantwell. Republican leadership reportedly pleaded with Rossi to jump into the ring. Rossi declined.

Speculation next centered on Rick White (who had taken Cantwell's House seat in 1994), state GOP chair Chris Vance, former Seattle television reporter Susan Hutchison, and former 8th district congressional candidate and Republican National Committee member Diane Tebelius. None of those chose to enter the race. Republican leaders finally got behind former Safeco Insurance CEO Mike McGavick.

=== Candidates ===
- William Edward Chovil, ran in the 2004 Republican Senate primary and received 0.95% of the Republican vote; running on a platform of opposition to what he referred to as "national and global communism and socialism"
- C. Mark Greene, legal assistant and Armed Forces veteran; won 47% in the 2004 Republican House of Representatives primary (9th District); emphasizes anti-imperialism platform in his campaigns; failed to secure ballot access through a lack of filing fee waiver petition signatures; filed Writ of Mandamus request in Thurston County Superior Court to be admitted to ballot
- Warren E. Hanson, commercial fisherman and perennial candidate; ran as a Democrat in the 2004 Senate primary and received 6.04% of the Democratic vote
- Brad Klippert, U.S. Army Reserves veteran; 2004 Republican primary candidate for U.S. Senate and received 5.72% of the Republican vote; evangelical Christian
- B. Barry Massoudi, founder of Cubicon management consulting; former chairman of Mercer Island Arts Council
- Gordon Allen Pross, ran in the 2004 Republican Senate primary and received 1.59% of the Republican vote

=== Polling and results ===
Candidate	SurveyUSA poll (August 11–13; ± 5.4 pct points)	Election results (initial data entry)		Election results (corrected)
Mike McGavick	66%	397,524	85.8780%	395,614
Brad Klippert	3%	32,213	6.9590%	32,073
Warren E. Hanson	6%	17,881	3.8629%	17,756
B. Barry Massoudi	2%	6,410	1.3848%	6,370
Gordon Allen Pross	1%	5,196	1.1225%	5,165
William Edward Chovil	3%	3,670	0.7928%	3,642
Undecided	19%	N/A	N/A	N/A
Total	301 Likely Republican Primary Voters	[462,894]		[460,620]

== General election ==
=== Candidates ===
Candidate	Party	Biography
Maria Cantwell	Democratic	Incumbent and former U.S. representative, won U.S. Senate seat in 2000 over Slade Gorton by a 2,229 vote margin -- Candidate statement
Mike McGavick	Republican	Chairman & former CEO of Safeco; resigned as CEO when he became a candidate -- Candidate statement
Bruce Guthrie	Libertarian	Chair of the Whatcom County Libertarian Party and 2004 U.S. congressional candidate -- Candidate statement
Aaron Dixon	Green	Former captain of the Seattle chapter of the Black Panther Party, longtime community activist -- Candidate statement
Robin Adair	Independent	-- Candidate statement

=== Debates ===
McGavick and Cantwell participated in two televised debates; one in Eastern Washington, sponsored by the Spokane Rotary, and another filmed at KING-5 studios in Seattle. Cantwell and McGavick were the only candidates included in the Eastern Washington debate, but Libertarian Bruce Guthrie, who had mortgaged his home and emptied his savings to loan his campaign $1.2 million to meet the debate's invitation requirements, joined them in the Seattle debate.

After failing to meet any of the requirements for an invitation to the Seattle debate, Aaron Dixon attempted to enter the KING-5 studios in order to participate in the debate. Accompanied by around 50 of his supporters, Dixon was prevented from entering the studios by station security and when Dixon refused to leave the building Seattle police were called and Dixon was arrested for investigation of trespassing.

According to the Seattle P-I, Bruce Guthrie won the Seattle debate just by being there. McGavick and Cantwell mainly stuck to their tried and true campaign messages and Guthrie was able to expose his campaign messages to a wide audience, something most third-party candidates are not able to do.

- Complete video of debate, October 12, 2006
- Complete video of debate, October 17, 2006

=== Platform ===
==== Iraq War ====
According to a CBS News poll conducted August 11–13, 28% of Americans feel that the Iraq War as the most important problem facing the country. A November 6 poll conducted by Strategic Vision indicated that 68% of Washingtonians approve of an "immediate withdrawal of United States military forces from Iraq, within six months".

Both McGavick and Cantwell have said that if they knew then what they know now they would have voted against the October 2002 Iraq Resolution, but neither have been completely clear on where they stand on the current presence of US troops in Iraq. When questioned further, McGavick has said that discussing the legitimacy of the war is inappropriate until all the troops come home. Cantwell has declined to apologize for her vote in favor of the resolution and, according to her campaign site, Cantwell still favors U.S. forces remaining in Iraq until they "achieve stability through greater international cooperation".

Cantwell has voted in favor of beginning withdrawal of troops, albeit a non-binding amendment with no timetable for completion (the Levin-Reed Amendment to S.2766), but voted against the Kerry-Feingold Amendment, which would have set a firm deadline of July 2007 for completing a withdrawal. She also co-sponsored an amendment to prohibiting the establishment of permanent US bases in Iraq.

On August 16, the Seattle Times criticized the vagueness of the major party candidates' positions on the war and demanded more clarity. The next day, Stuart Elway, director of the Elway Poll, described Cantwell's and McGavick's positions as "almost identical,".

Democratic primary challenger Tran, the Green Party's Dixon and Libertarian Guthrie all advocated an immediate withdrawal of troops from Iraq.

==== Minimum wage ====
Despite voting against a bill that would have raised the minimum wage, extended sales tax deductions, and cut estate taxes, Cantwell supports an increase in the federal minimum wage. She explained her vote against the bill by noting that the bill would have represented a $5 per hour wage drop for over 120,000 tip workers in Washington and overridden existing state minimum wage laws and was an attempt by the Republican party to pass its estate tax cut bill, which continuously failed to pass on its own in the senate.

McGavick called Cantwell's vote against the bill "profoundly disappointing".

Democratic challenger Tran and the Green Party's Dixon favored raising the national minimum wage to a "living wage". Libertarian Guthrie advocated eliminating the minimum wage laws altogether.

==== Millionaire's amendment ====
On August 11, Mike McGavick loaned his campaign $2 million. Some observers thought that the donation could trigger a "millionaire's amendment" of the 2002 Campaign Reform Act, which is intended to help candidates compete against wealthy opponents who self-finance their campaigns. The amendment allows supporters of the wealthy candidate's opponents to donate up to $12,600 in the primary and another $12,600 in the general election, instead of $2,100 in the primary and general election. The McGavick campaign denied that the amendment applied to Cantwell, as the loan was made prior to the primary election and would only affect his Republican opponents.

On August 29, the FEC issued a unanimous ruling on the question, saying that the millionaire's amendment was currently only triggered for McGavick's opponents in the primary; however, if either McGavick or Cantwell carried over some of their donations to their own campaign that were made in the primary into the general election, these donations would then trigger the amendment.

On October 1, Libertarian nominee Bruce Guthrie loaned his campaign nearly $1.2 million, but it was unclear if the loan triggered the amendment for McGavick and Cantwell. Both Cantwell and McGavick had a significant fundraising lead over Guthrie, and the amendment might not be triggered in cases where the self-financed candidate is already outfunded by their opponents. Guthrie apparently made the loan in order to get himself invited to a televised debate on a western Washington station, and he eventually repaid himself all but $6,000 of the loan.

=== McGavick's DUI arrest ===
The McGavick campaign suffered a setback when on August 24 McGavick claimed on his campaign blog to have been cited in 1993 and charged with driving under the influence of alcohol when he blew a 0.17 in a breath analyzer test, well above the .10 legal limit in Montgomery County, Maryland. However, on September 1, the Everett Herald newspaper uncovered the original police report and disclosed that there were several inaccuracies in McGavick's recount, namely that he actually charged with running a "steady red light", not "cutting a yellow a little close," and that he was actually arrested for the DUI, not merely cited. The DUI charge was later removed from McGavick's record, in accordance with Maryland law, after completing an alcohol awareness program, paying a fine, and a year's probation. According to Jennifer Duffy of The Cook Political Report, McGavick undermined the rationale of his campaign that he was not acting like a typical politician and his omissions caused cynical voters to think he acted like a typical politician.

=== Fundraising ===
Fundraising totals as of December 18, 2006
Candidate	Party	Raised	Spent	Cash on hand
Cantwell, Maria	Democrat	$18,873,026	$16,516,060	$338,024
McGavick, Mike	Republican	$10,821,279	$10,796,775	$24,502
Guthrie, Bruce	Libertarian	$100,345	$82,900	$13,201
Dixon, Aaron	Green	$87,699	$85,179	$2,520
Adair, Robin	Independent	$16,199	$16,079	$120

=== Predictions ===
Source	Ranking	As of
The Cook Political Report	Likely D	November 6, 2006
Sabato's Crystal Ball	Likely D	November 6, 2006
Rothenberg Political Report	Likely D	November 6, 2006
Real Clear Politics	Likely D	November 6, 2006

=== Endorsements ===
Maria Cantwell (D)

U.S. executive branch officials

- Bill Clinton, 42nd president of the United States
- Tom Foley, 25th United States ambassador to Japan, 49th speaker of the United States House of Representatives, member of the U.S. House of Representatives from Washington's 5th district

Organizations

- EMILY's List
- Human Rights Campaign
- League of Conservation Voters
- NARAL Pro-Choice America, Washington
- National Women's Political Caucus
- Sierra Club Washington
- Veterans of Foreign Wars PAC

Newspapers

- The Columbian
- The Daily News
- Esquire
- The Everett Herald
- Northwest Asian Weekly
- The Oregonian
- Seattle Post-Intelligencer
- The Stranger

Labor unions

- Alliance for Retired Americans
- Washington Education Association
- Washington State Fraternal Order of Police
- Washington State Labor Council, AFL-CIO
Mike McGavick (R)

U.S. executive branch officials

- Barbara Bush, First Lady of the United States

U.S. senators

- Daniel J. Evans, United States senator from Washington
- Bill Frist, United States senator from Tennessee
- John McCain, United States senator from Arizona

U.S. representatives

- Jennifer Dunn, member of the U.S. House of Representatives from Washington's 8th district
- Doc Hastings, member of the U.S. House of Representatives from Washington's 4th district
- Dave Reichert, member of the U.S. House of Representatives from Washington's 8th district
- Cathy McMorris Rodgers, member of the U.S. House of Representatives from Washington's 5th district

State legislators

- Dino Rossi, member of the Washington State Senate, 2004 gubernatorial candidate

Newspapers

- The Seattle Times
- The Spokesman-Review

=== Polling ===
Aggregate polls

Source of poll aggregation	Dates administered	Dates updated	Maria Cantwell (D)	Mike McGavick (R)	Other/Undecided (Note: Calculated by taking the difference of 100% and all other candidates combined.)	Margin
Real Clear Politics	October 25 – November 2, 2006	November 2, 2006	53.8%	40.5%	5.7%	Cantwell +13.3%

Poll results for general election
Source	Date	Cantwell (D)	McGavick (R)
Strategic Vision (R)	May 15–17, 2005	49%	36%
Strategic Vision (R)	August 2005	46%	38%
Strategic Vision (R)	September 2005	49%	39%
Zogby/WSJ	September 29, 2005	49%	39%
Strategic Vision (R)	October 27, 2005	48%	39%
Rasmussen	November 10, 2005	52%	37%
Rasmussen	December 5, 2005	52%	37%
Strategic Vision (R)	December 7, 2005	50%	39%
Rasmussen	January 5, 2006	51%	36%
Elway	February 6–9, 2006	55%	25%
Rasmussen	February 12, 2006	50%	36%
Strategic Vision (R)	February 15, 2006	48%	40%
Rasmussen	March 20, 2006	49%	36%
Zogby/WSJ	March 31, 2006	49%	42%
Strategic Vision (R)	March 31, 2006	49%	39%
Rasmussen	April 13, 2006	48%	40%
Strategic Vision (R)	April 26, 2006	48%	40%
Elway	May 5, 2006	52%	23%
Rasmussen	May 16, 2006	46%	41%
Strategic Vision (R)	May 24, 2006	47%	42%
Rasmussen	June 19, 2006	44%	40%
Zogby/WSJ	June 21, 2006	48%	43%
Strategic Vision (R)	June 30, 2006	47%	43%
Rasmussen	July 17, 2006	48%	37%
Elway	July 22, 2006	47%	33%
Zogby/WSJ	July 24, 2006	49%	42%
Strategic Vision (R)	July 26, 2006	48%	44%
Rasmussen	August 24, 2006	46%	40%
Zogby/WSJ	August 28, 2006	51%	43%
Strategic Vision (R)	August 29, 2006	48%	43%
SurveyUSA	August 29, 2006	53%	36%
Zogby/WSJ	September 11, 2006	50%	42%
Rasmussen	September 12, 2006	52%	35%
Rasmussen	September 20, 2006	48%	42%
SurveyUSA	September 24, 2006	54%	42%
Zogby/WSJ	September 28, 2006	50%	43%
Strategic Vision (R)	September 28, 2006	49%	40%
Elway	October 1, 2006	53%	35%
Mason-Dixon/MSNBC	October 2, 2006	50%	40%
SurveyUSA	October 15, 2006	51%	43%
Zogby/WSJ	October 16, 2006	52%	45%
Rasmussen	October 17, 2006	53%	38%
Strategic Vision (R)	October 20, 2006	51%	42%
Mason-Dixon/MSNBC	October 24, 2006	52%	37%
Rasmussen	October 30, 2006	54%	42%
Zogby/WSJ	October 31, 2006	50%	46%
Mason-Dixon/MSNBC	November 5, 2006	54%	38%
Strategic Vision (R)	November 6, 2006	53%	42%

Hypothetical polling
with Dunn

Poll source	Date(s) administered	Sample size	Margin of error	Maria Cantwell (D)	Jennifer Dunn (R)	Undecided
Strategic Vision (R)	May 15–17, 2005	800 (RV)	± 3.0%	50%	40%	10%

with Nethercutt

Poll source	Date(s) administered	Sample size	Margin of error	Maria Cantwell (D)	George Nethercutt (R)	Undecided
Strategic Vision (R)	May 15–17, 2005	800 (RV)	± 3.0%	49%	38%	13%

with Rossi

Poll source	Date(s) administered	Sample size	Margin of error	Maria Cantwell (D)	Dino Rossi (R)	Undecided
Strategic Vision (R)	May 15–17, 2005	800 (RV)	± 3.0%	41%	50%	9%

with Vance

Poll source	Date(s) administered	Sample size	Margin of error	Maria Cantwell (D)	Chris Vance (R)	Undecided
Strategic Vision (R)	May 15–17, 2005	800 (RV)	± 3.0%	54%	35%	11%

with White

Poll source	Date(s) administered	Sample size	Margin of error	Maria Cantwell (D)	Rick White (R)	Undecided
Strategic Vision (R)	May 15–17, 2005	800 (RV)	± 3.0%	50%	37%	13%

=== Results ===
Cantwell was projected to be the winner right when the polls closed at 11:00 P.M. EST. From the Washington Secretary of State 2006 General Election Results.

2006 United States Senate election in Washington
Party	Candidate	Votes	%	±%
Democratic	Maria Cantwell (incumbent)	1,184,659	56.85%	+8.12%
Republican	Mike McGavick	832,106	39.93%	−8.71%
Libertarian	Bruce Guthrie	29,331	1.41%	−1.22%
Green	Aaron Dixon	21,254	1.02%	N/A
Independent	Robin Adair	16,384	0.79%	N/A
Total votes		2,083,734	100.00%	N/A
Democratic hold				

==== By county ====
County	Maria Cantwell Democratic		Mike McGavick Republican		Various candidates Other parties		Margin		Total
County	#	%	#	%	#	%	#	%	Total
Adams	1,355	37.18%	2,215	60.78%	74	2.03%	-860	-23.60%	3,644
Asotin	3,730	50.70%	3,393	46.12%	234	3.18%	337	4.58%	7,357
Benton	21,099	42.52%	27,369	55.15%	1,155	2.33%	-6,270	-12.64%	49,623
Chelan	9,527	41.19%	13,024	56.30%	581	2.51%	-3,497	-15.12%	23,132
Clallam	15,730	51.71%	13,699	45.03%	990	3.25%	2,031	6.68%	30,419
Clark	60,525	52.67%	51,254	44.60%	3,131	2.72%	9,271	8.07%	114,910
Columbia	754	39.25%	1,125	58.56%	42	2.19%	-371	-19.31%	1,921
Cowlitz	17,390	55.90%	12,569	40.40%	1,149	3.69%	4,821	15.50%	31,108
Douglas	4,273	38.33%	6,621	59.39%	254	2.28%	-2,348	-21.06%	11,148
Ferry	1,174	41.84%	1,544	55.02%	88	3.14%	-370	-13.19%	2,806
Franklin	5,438	42.15%	7,208	55.86%	257	1.99%	-1,770	-13.72%	12,903
Garfield	502	42.08%	659	55.24%	32	2.68%	-157	-13.16%	1,193
Grant	7,314	36.95%	11,830	59.77%	649	3.28%	-4,516	-22.82%	19,793
Grays Harbor	12,739	57.88%	8,517	38.70%	752	3.42%	4,222	19.18%	22,008
Island	16,289	54.32%	12,977	43.28%	719	2.40%	3,312	11.05%	29,985
Jefferson	10,164	63.15%	5,212	32.38%	718	4.46%	4,952	30.77%	16,094
King	419,898	66.57%	190,678	30.23%	20,150	3.19%	229,220	36.34%	630,726
Kitsap	50,939	56.65%	35,932	39.96%	3,054	3.40%	15,007	16.69%	89,925
Kittitas	5,567	45.11%	6,419	52.01%	356	2.88%	-852	-6.90%	12,342
Klickitat	3,670	49.78%	3,439	46.64%	264	3.58%	231	3.13%	7,373
Lewis	9,898	39.23%	14,517	57.53%	818	3.24%	-4,619	-18.31%	25,233
Lincoln	1,911	40.02%	2,735	57.28%	129	2.70%	-824	-17.26%	4,775
Mason	11,747	55.35%	8,736	41.16%	739	3.48%	3,011	14.19%	21,222
Okanogan	5,841	45.31%	6,555	50.85%	496	3.85%	-714	-5.54%	12,892
Pacific	5,175	59.33%	3,239	37.14%	308	3.53%	1,936	22.20%	8,722
Pend Oreille	2,346	45.39%	2,564	49.61%	258	4.99%	-218	-4.22%	5,168
Pierce	120,050	55.92%	88,219	41.09%	6,416	2.99%	31,831	14.83%	214,685
San Juan	5,323	64.69%	2,483	30.18%	422	5.13%	2,840	34.52%	8,228
Skagit	21,612	52.62%	18,094	44.06%	1,363	3.32%	3,518	8.57%	41,069
Skamania	2,134	52.94%	1,738	43.12%	159	3.94%	396	9.82%	4,031
Snohomish	118,170	57.31%	81,992	39.77%	6,016	2.92%	36,178	17.55%	206,178
Spokane	77,295	49.82%	72,209	46.54%	5,638	3.63%	5,086	3.28%	155,142
Stevens	7,042	41.28%	9,378	54.97%	641	3.76%	-2,336	-13.69%	17,061
Thurston	49,529	58.87%	30,683	36.47%	3,924	4.66%	18,846	22.40%	84,136
Wahkiakum	1,010	55.65%	733	40.39%	72	3.97%	277	15.26%	1,815
Walla Walla	8,463	47.02%	9,059	50.33%	477	2.65%	-596	-3.31%	17,999
Whatcom	38,219	55.23%	28,267	40.85%	2,714	3.92%	9,952	14.38%	69,200
Whitman	6,425	49.41%	6,115	47.02%	464	3.57%	310	2.38%	13,004
Yakima	24,392	44.54%	29,106	53.15%	1,266	2.31%	-4,714	-8.61%	54,764
Totals	1,184,659	56.85%	832,106	39.93%	66,969	3.21%	352,553	16.92%	2,083,734

==== Counties that flipped from Republican to Democratic ====
- Asotin (largest city: Clarkston)
- Clallam (largest city: Port Angeles)
- Clark (largest city: Vancouver)
- Cowlitz (largest city: Longview)
- Grays Harbor (largest city: Aberdeen)
- Island (largest city: Oak Harbor)
- Kitsap (largest city: Bremerton)
- Klickitat (largest city: Goldendale)
- Mason (largest city: Shelton)
- Pacific (largest city: Raymond)
- Pierce (largest city: Tacoma)
- Skagit (largest city: Mount Vernon)
- Skamania (largest city: Carson)
- Spokane (largest city: Spokane)
- Wahkiakum (largest city: Puget Island)
- Whatcom (largest city: Bellingham)
- Whitman (largest city: Pullman)

== See also ==
- 2006 United States Senate elections
