= 2012 United States Senate election in Washington =

- November 6, 2012
- Turnout: 64.1% (voting eligible)
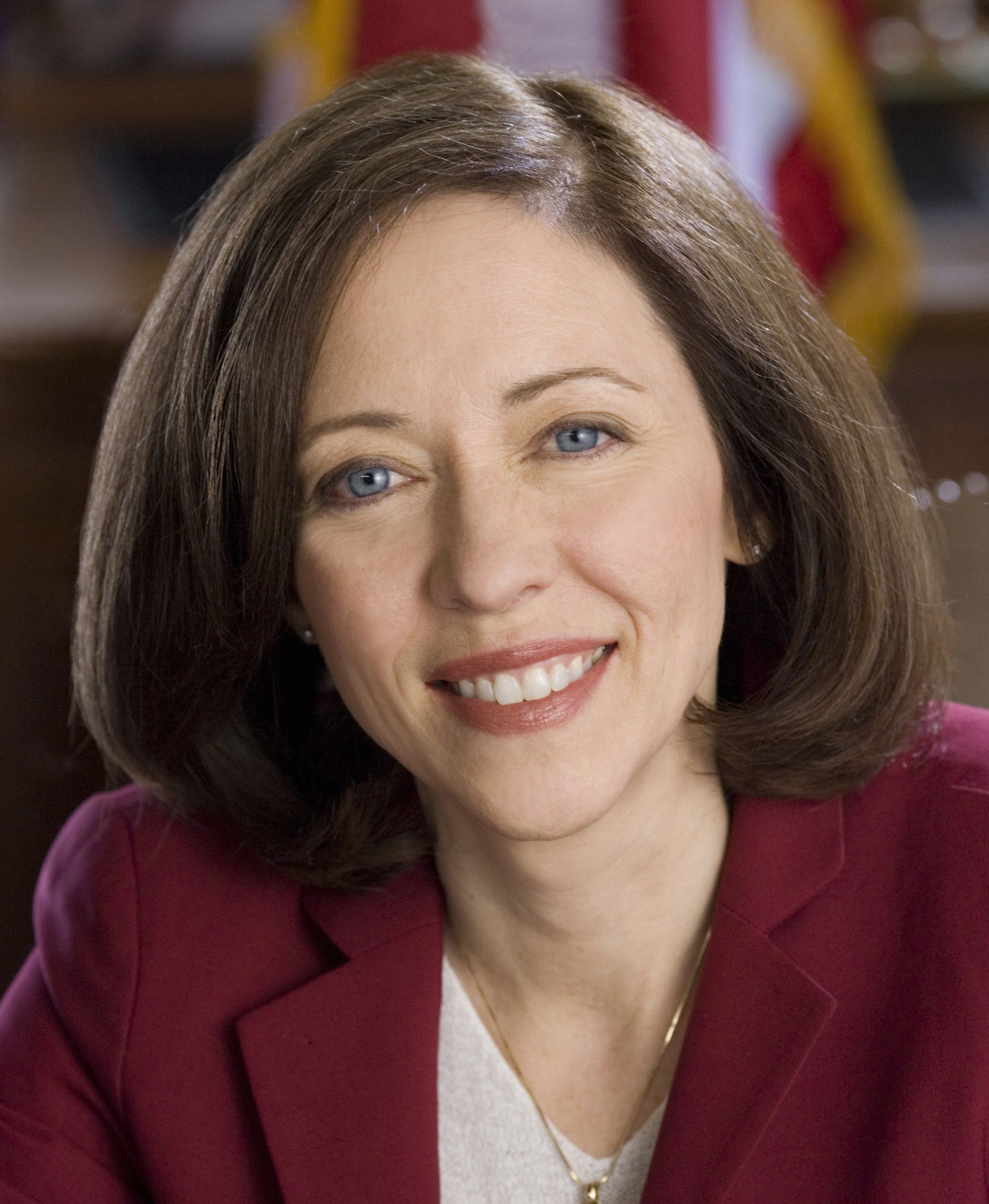

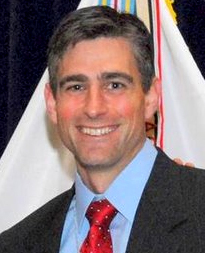
Nominee	Maria Cantwell	Michael Baumgartner
Party	Democratic	Republican
Popular vote	1,855,493	1,213,924
Percentage	60.45%	39.55%
- Cantwell: 50–60% 60–70% 70–80% 80–90% >90% Baumgartner: 50–60% 60–70% 70–80% 80–90% >90% Tie: 50% No votes
U.S. senator before election
Maria Cantwell
Democratic
Elected U.S. Senator
Maria Cantwell
Democratic

The 2012 United States Senate election in Washington took place on November 6, 2012, concurrently with the 2012 U.S. presidential election, other elections to the United States Senate and House of Representatives, and various state and local elections. Incumbent Democratic U.S. Senator Maria Cantwell won re-election to a third term by a significant margin, outperforming President Barack Obama's margin in the concurrent presidential election by 6%.

== Background ==
Maria Cantwell won re-election to a second term with 56.85% of the vote against Mike McGavick in the 2006 Washington U.S. Senate election.

== Top-two primary election ==
=== Candidates ===
==== Democratic ====
- Maria Cantwell, incumbent U.S. senator
- Timothy Wilson

==== Republican ====
- Michael Baumgartner, state senator
- Art Coday, physician
- Chuck Jackson, merchant mariner
- Mike the Mover, perennial candidate
- Glen R. Stockwell, president of Washington State Economic Development Corporation

===== Declined =====
- Bill Bryant, Port of Seattle Commission president
- Clint Didier, former NFL football player (endorsed Coday)
- Doc Hastings, U.S. representative
- Jaime Herrera Beutler, U.S. representative
- John Koster, Snohomish County Councilman and candidate for the 2nd congressional district in 2010 (running for the U.S. House)
- Cathy McMorris Rodgers, U.S. representative
- Dave Reichert, U.S. representative
- Phillip Yin, Hong Kong–based anchor for Bloomberg Television

==== Others ====
- Will Baker (Reform Party)

=== Results ===
County results Cantwell: 30–40%; 40–50%; 50–60%; 60–70%; Baumgartner: 40–50%; 50–60%

Congressional district results Cantwell: 40–50%; 50–60%; 60–70%; 70–80%; Baumgartner: 40–50%

Blanket primary results
Party	Candidate	Votes	%
Democratic	Maria Cantwell (incumbent)	772,058	55.66
Republican	Michael Baumgartner	417,141	30.07
Republican	Art Coday	79,727	5.75
Democratic	Timothy Wilson	31,817	2.29
Republican	Chuck Jackson	25,983	1.87
Republican	Glenn R. Stockwell	25,793	1.86
Republican	Mike the Mover	19,535	1.41
Reform	Will Baker	15,005	1.08
Total votes		1,387,059	100.00

==== By congressional district ====
District	Cantwell	Baumgartner	Coday	Representative
1st	52%	32%	9%	Suzan DelBene
2nd	58%	26%	7%	Rick Larsen
3rd	46%	34%	6%	Jaime Herrera Beutler
4th	40%	41%	6%	Doc Hastings
5th	44%	43%	4%	Cathy McMorris Rodgers
6th	56%	28%	6%	Norm Dicks
7th	78%	15%	3%	Jim McDermott
8th	49%	35%	7%	Dave Reichert
9th	65%	24%	5%	Adam Smith
10th	57%	29%	6%	Denny Heck

== General election ==
=== Candidates ===
- Michael Baumgartner (Republican), state senator
- Maria Cantwell (Democratic), incumbent U.S. senator

=== Debates ===
- Complete video of debate, October 12, 2012 - C-SPAN

=== Fundraising ===
Candidate (party)	Receipts	Disbursements	Cash on hand	Debt
Maria Cantwell (D)	$8,032,254	$6,355,260	$2,176,258	$2,171,350
Michael Baumgartner (R)	$689,690	$422,428	$181,841	$45,689
Source: Federal Election Commission

=== Top contributors ===
Maria Cantwell	Contribution	Michael Baumgartner	Contribution
Microsoft	$83,982	Anderson Hay & Grain	$5,000
EMILY's List	$77,900	Columbia Management Systems, By Lar	$5,000
Morgan & Morgan	$40,000	Ignition Partners	$5,000
League of Conservation Voters	$39,900	Kvc Development Co	$5,000
University of Washington	$35,900	Acorn Campus Ventures	$4,000
K&L Gates	$35,048	Legacy LLC	$3,523
Boeing	$30,625	Inland Empire Paper	$3,750
Intellectual Ventures	$27,250	Savers Inc	$3,523
McBee Strategic Consulting	$26,650	Red Lion Hotels	$3,500
Second Avenue Partners	$24,500	National Cotton Council	$3,300

=== Top industries ===
Maria Cantwell	Contribution	Michael Baumgartner	Contribution
Lawyers/law firms	$696,936	Retired	$45,756
Retired	$621,231	Financial institutions	$10,000
Lobbyists	$539,418	Financial institutions	$310,487
Financial institutions	$310,487	Agribusiness	$9,550
Computers/Internet	$206,970	Health professionals	$6,150
Real estate	$179,169	Misc. finance	$4,250
Health professionals	$169,937	Mining	$4,25
Business services	$167,629	Timber/forest products	$3,750
Casinos/gambling	$165,850	General contractors	$3,000
Entertainment industry	$136,457	Real estate	$2,950

=== Predictions ===
Source	Ranking	As of
The Cook Political Report	Solid D	November 1, 2012
Sabato's Crystal Ball	Safe D	November 5, 2012
Rothenberg Political Report	Safe D	November 2, 2012
Real Clear Politics	Likely D	November 5, 2012

=== Endorsements ===
Maria Cantwell (D)

State legislators

- Dale Foreman, former majority leader of the Washington House of Representatives and former chair of the Washington State Republican Party (Republican)

Newspapers

- The Seattle Times

=== Polling ===
Aggregate polls

Source of poll aggregation	Dates administered	Dates updated	Maria Cantwell (D)	Michael Baumgartner (R)	Other/Undecided (Note: Calculated by taking the difference of 100% and all other candidates combined.)	Margin
Real Clear Politics	October 14 – November 3, 2012	November 3, 2012	56.7%	36.3%	7.0%	Cantwell +20.4%

Poll source	Date(s) administered	Sample size	Margin of error	Maria Cantwell (D)	Michael Baumgartner (R)	Other	Undecided
Survey USA	November 21–23, 2011	549	±4.3%	51%	39%	—	10%
Survey USA	January 12–16, 2012	617	±4.0%	50%	41%	—	8%
Public Policy Polling	February 16–19, 2012	1,264	±2.76%	51%	36%	—	13%
Public Policy Polling	June 14–17, 2012	1,073	±3.0%	51%	35%	—	14%
Survey USA	July 16–17, 2012	630	±4.0%	51%	40%	—	9%
Survey USA	September 7–9, 2012	524	±4.4%	54%	38%	—	8%
Rasmussen Reports	September 26, 2012	500	±4.5%	57%	37%	1%	5%
SurveyUSA	September 28–30, 2012	540	±4.3%	53%	40%	—	6%
The Washington Poll	October 1–16, 2012	782	±3.5%	58%	35%	—	7%
Rasmussen Reports	October 14, 2012	500	±4.5%	52%	37%	1%	9%
KCTS 9/Washington Poll	October 18–31, 2012	632	±3.9%	61%	33%	—	6%
Public Policy Polling	November 1–3, 2012	932	±3.2%	57%	39%	—	4%

Hypothetical polling

Poll source	Date(s) administered	Sample size	Margin of error	Maria Cantwell (D)	Bill Bryant (R)	Other	Undecided
Public Policy Polling	February 16–19, 2012	1,264	±2.76%	50%	36%	—	14%

Poll source	Date(s) administered	Sample size	Margin of error	Maria Cantwell (D)	Cathy M. Rodgers (R)	Other	Undecided
Public Policy Polling	July 27 – August 1, 2010	1,204	±2.8%	49%	37%	—	13%
Public Policy Polling	May 12–15, 2011	1,098	±3.0%	50%	31%	—	19%

Poll source	Date(s) administered	Sample size	Margin of error	Maria Cantwell (D)	Dave Reichert (R)	Other	Undecided
Public Policy Polling	July 27 – August 1, 2010	1,204	±2.8%	47%	41%	—	12%
Public Policy Polling	May 12–15, 2011	1,098	±3.0%	49%	35%	—	16%
Survey USA	November 21–23, 2011	549	±4.3%	48%	41%	—	10%

Poll source	Date(s) administered	Sample size	Margin of error	Maria Cantwell (D)	Clint Didier (R)	Other	Undecided
Public Policy Polling	May 12–15, 2011	1,098	±3.0%	51%	35%	—	13%

Poll source	Date(s) administered	Sample size	Margin of error	Maria Cantwell (D)	Susan Hutchison (R)	Other	Undecided
Public Policy Polling	May 12–15, 2011	1,098	±3.0%	49%	35%	—	16%
Survey USA	November 21–23, 2011	549	±4.3%	49%	38%	—	13%

Poll source	Date(s) administered	Sample size	Margin of error	Maria Cantwell (D)	Dino Rossi (R)	Other	Undecided
Public Policy Polling	May 12–15, 2011	1,098	±3.0%	53%	40%	—	8%
Public Policy Polling	February 16–19, 2012	1,264	±2.76%	53%	41%	—	7%

=== Results ===
2012 United States Senate election in Washington
Party	Candidate	Votes	%	±%
Democratic	Maria Cantwell (incumbent)	1,855,493	60.45%	+3.60%
Republican	Michael Baumgartner	1,213,924	39.55%	−0.38%
Total votes		3,069,417	100.00%	N/A
Democratic hold				

==== By county ====
By county

County	Maria Cantwell Democratic		Michael Baumgartner Republican		Margin		Total
County	%	#	%	#	%	#	Total
Adams	39.29%	1,859	60.71%	2,872	–21.41%	–1,013	4,731
Asotin	46.77%	4,563	53.23%	5,193	–6.46%	–630	9,756
Benton	42.69%	33,391	57.31%	44,828	–14.62%	–11,437	78,219
Chelan	46.98%	14,892	53.02%	16,808	–6.04%	–1,916	31,700
Clallam	53.89%	20,252	46.11%	17,331	7.77%	2,921	37,583
Clark	53.05%	98,457	46.95%	87,150	6.09%	11,307	185,607
Columbia	36.97%	827	63.03%	1,410	–26.06%	–583	2,237
Cowlitz	56.42%	24,820	43.58%	19,170	12.89%	5,670	43,990
Douglas	42.09%	6,228	57.91%	8,570	–15.83%	–2,342	14,798
Ferry	43.67%	1,494	56.33%	1,927	–12.66%	–433	3,421
Franklin	43.11%	9,689	56.89%	12,786	–13.78%	–3,097	22,475
Garfield	36.39%	453	63.61%	792	–27.23%	–339	1,245
Grant	38.72%	10,621	61.28%	16,811	–22.56%	–6,190	27,432
Grays Harbor	61.45%	17,491	38.55%	10,971	22.91%	6,520	28,462
Island	55.48%	23,024	44.52%	18,475	10.96%	4,549	41,499
Jefferson	68.78%	13,471	31.22%	6,114	37.56%	7,357	19,585
King	72.27%	683,067	27.73%	262,034	44.55%	421,033	945,101
Kitsap	58.95%	71,656	41.05%	49,890	17.91%	21,766	121,546
Kittitas	49.22%	8,746	50.78%	9,023	–1.56%	–277	17,769
Klickitat	50.62%	5,115	49.38%	4,990	1.24%	125	10,105
Lewis	43.01%	14,445	56.99%	19,139	–13.98%	–4,694	33,584
Lincoln	37.12%	2,157	62.88%	3,654	–25.76%	–1,497	5,811
Mason	57.47%	16,057	42.53%	11,885	14.93%	4,172	27,942
Okanogan	47.84%	7,963	52.16%	8,683	–4.33%	–720	16,646
Pacific	60.86%	6,323	39.14%	4,067	21.71%	2,256	10,390
Pend Oreille	43.20%	2,867	56.80%	3,769	–13.59%	–902	6,636
Pierce	59.76%	201,827	40.24%	135,888	19.53%	65,939	337,715
San Juan	70.37%	7,351	29.63%	3,095	40.74%	4,256	10,446
Skagit	56.17%	30,635	43.83%	23,900	12.35%	6,735	54,535
Skamania	53.13%	2,823	46.87%	2,490	6.27%	333	5,313
Snohomish	60.50%	196,534	39.50%	128,322	21.00%	68,212	324,856
Spokane	49.92%	110,033	50.08%	110,372	–0.15%	–339	220,405
Stevens	39.21%	8,671	60.79%	13,441	–21.57%	–4,770	22,112
Thurston	62.82%	78,468	37.18%	46,449	25.63%	32,019	124,917
Wahkiakum	55.32%	1,253	44.68%	1,012	10.64%	241	2,265
Walla Walla	46.45%	11,464	53.55%	13,217	–7.10%	–1,753	24,681
Whatcom	59.49%	59,938	40.51%	40,818	18.98%	19,120	100,756
Whitman	49.77%	8,384	50.23%	8,463	–0.47%	–79	16,847
Yakima	50.05%	38,184	49.95%	38,115	0.09%	69	76,299
Total	60.45%	1,855,493	39.55%	1,213,924	20.90%	641,569	3,069,417

==== Counties that flipped from Republican to Democratic ====
- Yakima (largest city: Yakima)

==== Counties that flipped from Democratic to Republican ====
- Asotin (largest city: Clarkston)
- Spokane (largest city: Spokane)
- Whitman (largest city: Pullman)

==== By congressional district ====
Cantwell won eight of ten congressional districts, including two that elected Republicans.

District	Cantwell	Baumgartner	Representative
1st	57%	43%	Suzan DelBene
2nd	63%	37%	Rick Larsen
3rd	53%	47%	Jaime Herrera Beutler
4th	45%	55%	Doc Hastings
5th	48%	52%	Cathy McMorris Rodgers
6th	61%	39%	Derek Kilmer
7th	82%	18%	Jim McDermott
8th	55%	45%	Dave Reichert
9th	72%	28%	Adam Smith
10th	61%	39%	Denny Heck

== See also ==
- 2012 United States Senate elections
- 2012 United States House of Representatives elections in Washington
- 2012 United States presidential election in Washington
- 2012 Washington gubernatorial election
