= Aaron Dixon =

American activist and former Black Panther captain

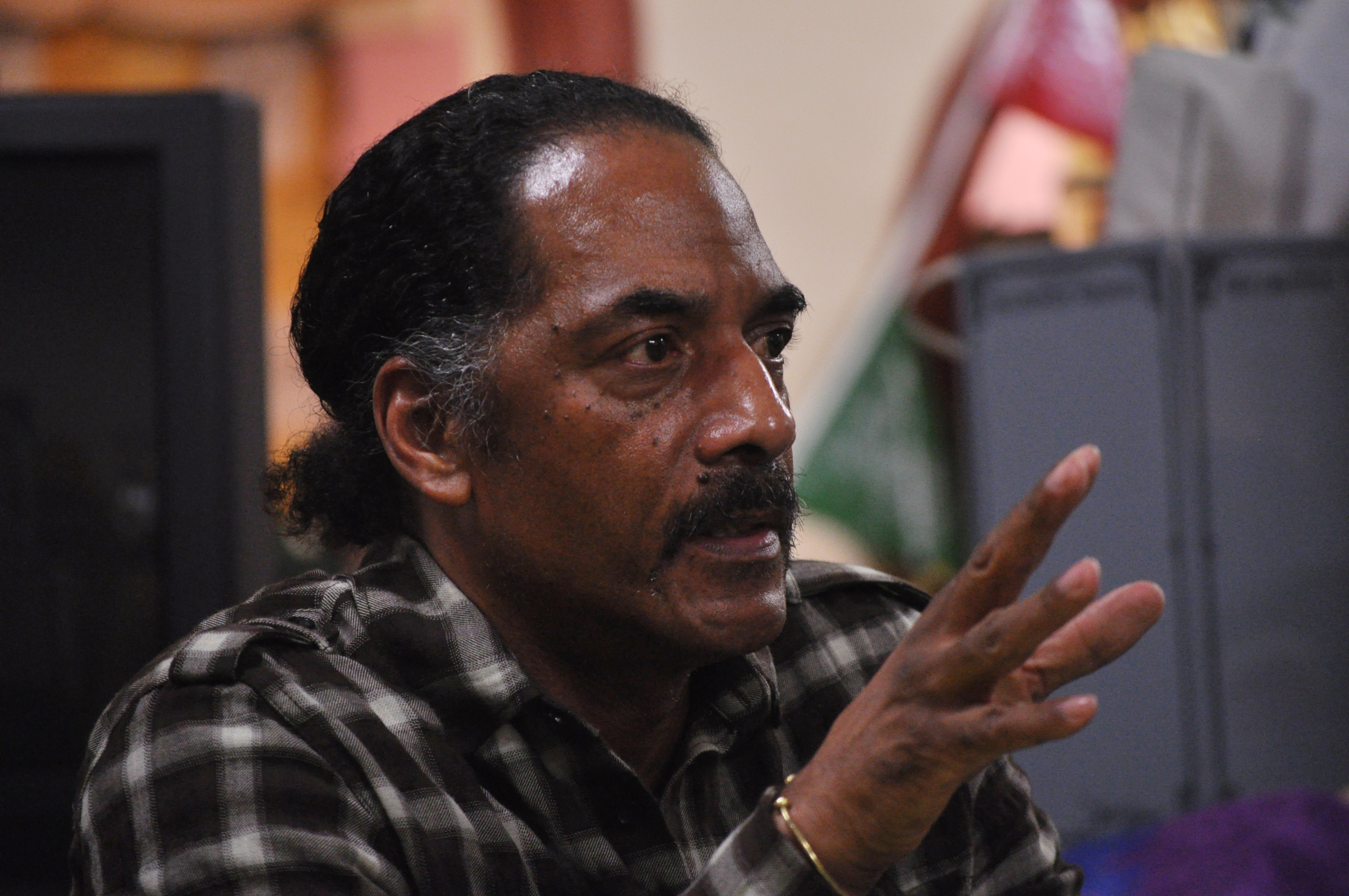
- Dixon in 2012

Personal details
- Born: January 2, 1949 (age 77) Chicago, Illinois, U.S.
- Party: Black Panther Party; Green Party
- Occupation: Political Activist

Aaron L. Dixon (born January 2, 1949) is an American activist and a former captain of the Seattle chapter of the Black Panther Party for its initial four years. In 2006, he ran for the United States Senate in Washington state on the Green Party ticket.

== Background ==
As an adolescent, Dixon marched with Dr. Martin Luther King Jr. to end housing discrimination in Seattle, and was one of the first volunteers to participate in the busing program to integrate schools. King's assassination, on April 4, 1968, deeply affected Dixon and propelled him towards the Black Power Movement. That week, Dixon and his brother Elmer were in San Francisco for the West Coast Black Student Union conference, and during that time attended the funeral of Bobby Hutton, a member of the Black Panther Party killed on April 6 in a confrontation with the police. Following the funeral, Dixon met with some of the Black Panther leadership such as Bobby Seale and Kathleen Cleaver, who made a vivid impression upon him. The time spent in San Francisco lead the Dixon brothers to set up the first Black Panther chapter outside of California, in Seattle.

While a member of the Black Panthers, Dixon started the Free Breakfast for Children program that fed thousands of children and helped to open a free community medical and legal clinic. The clinic continues to this day as the Carolyn Downs Family Medical Center. At the same time, according to the Seattle Weekly, the Panthers were involved in the "firebombing [of] businesses and institutions that they considered racist."

Dixon also became involved in electoral politics when he worked on the mayoral campaign of Lionel Wilson, who was elected as the first black mayor of Oakland, California in 1977.

After leaving the Panthers, Dixon worked for several non-profit organizations, focusing on drug and gang violence and working with homeless youth. In 2002, he founded Central House, a non-profit providing transitional housing for homeless young adults. Central House also has a Youth Leadership Project that operates at four Seattle public high schools. It teaches youth to think positively, graduate high school, and control their own destinies. It also teaches them the importance of serving their community.

Dixon is the father of six and lives in Albuquerque, New Mexico.

== 2006 United States Senate race ==
On March 9, 2006, Dixon announced his decision to seek the Green Party's nomination for U.S. Senate, challenging incumbent Maria Cantwell on her continued support for the U.S. presence in Iraq and the USA PATRIOT Act.

His platform included a call for immediate withdrawal from Iraq, the repeal of the PATRIOT Act, support of same-sex marriage, the implementation of a system of universal single-payer health care, the end the war on drugs and a renewed focus on the issue of poverty.

On May 13, 2006, Dixon was nominated as the Green Party of Washington State's nominee for the U.S. Senate. On July 10, 2006, the Secretary of State's office announced that the Dixon campaign had gathered the appropriate nomination signatures and that Aaron Dixon would appear on the November ballot. Besides Dixon and Cantwell, the ballot included Libertarian nominee Bruce Guthrie, independent candidate Robin Adair and Republican challenger Mike McGavick.

=== Endorsements and criticisms ===
A positive reaction to Dixon's candidacy came from Republican Chairwoman Diane Tebelius. Negative reactions from other Democrats, who cited the vote splitting that Dixon would have on Cantwell's voters, thus aiding the pro-Iraq War Republican candidate.

Dixon faced criticism for having criminal charges on his record, most for traffic violations, and owing the city and county substantial fines as a result. Public records revealed that Dixon: had only ever voted once in King County, in 1998; was not married to his claimed wife, and was still married to a different woman; and owed several thousand dollars to another former spouse for child support payments. Dixon described these as additional costs in addition to his agreed payments, and indicated he was working to pay the debt.

=== October 17 debate exclusion and arrest ===
Aaron Dixon and supporters protesting exclusion from KING-5 debates

Dixon did not meet the sponsors' criteria of public support or fundraising to participate in a televised debate of the Senate candidates to be held on October 17, 2006, sponsored by various news outlets and civic organizations in King County; to take part, candidates had to have garnered 10 percent of the tally in a scientific poll; be the nominated candidate of a party that won 10 percent of the vote in the last election; or have raised at least $1.2 million.

On the day of the debate, Dixon was arrested for trespassing at the KING-TV studio in Seattle, where he and his supporters were protesting his exclusion from the debate being taped there for broadcast later that day.

=== Election results ===
1. Maria Cantwell (D) 1,184,659 - 56.81%
2. Mike McGavick (R) 832,106 - 39.91%
3. Bruce Guthrie (L) 29,331 - 1.41%
4. Aaron Dixon (G) 21,254 - 1.02%
5. Robin Adair (I) 16,384 votes - 0.79%
6. Write-ins (NP) 1,445 votes - 0.07%

== Post-campaign ==
In the months following the campaign, Dixon reorganized much of the campaign's organization into the Center for Social Justice, based out of the campaign's former headquarters in Seattle's Central district. The Center organized an anti-war rally and march on January 27, 2007, in Seattle, which had a turnout of several thousand.

In 2012, Dixon published a memoir, My People Are Rising: Memoir of a Black Panther Party Captain, ISBN 978-1608461783.

== See also ==
- List of African-American United States Senate candidates
