= Michael Baumgartner =

American politician (born 1975)

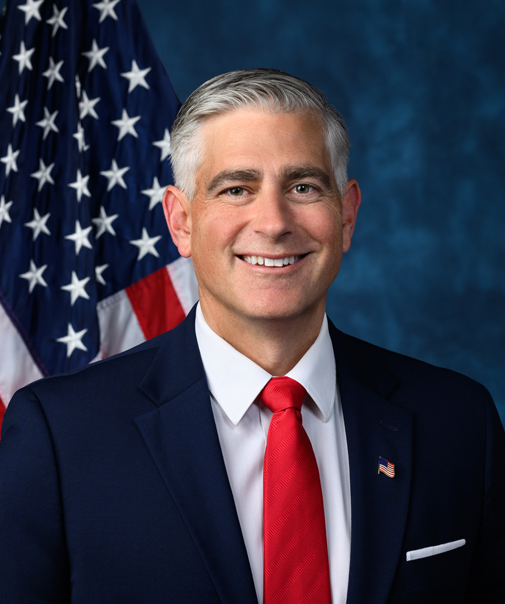
- Official portrait, 2024

Member of the U.S. House of Representatives from Washington's 5th district
- Incumbent
- Assumed office January 3, 2025
- Preceded by: Cathy McMorris Rodgers

Treasurer of Spokane County
- In office January 1, 2019 – January 3, 2025
- Preceded by: Rob Chase
- Succeeded by: Mike Volz

Member of the Washington Senate from the 6th district
- In office January 10, 2011 – January 14, 2019
- Preceded by: Chris Marr
- Succeeded by: Jeff Holy

Personal details
- Born: Michael James Baumgartner; December 13, 1975 (age 50) Pullman, Washington, U.S.
- Party: Republican
- Spouse: Eleanor
- Children: 5
- Education: Washington State University (BA); Harvard University (MPA)
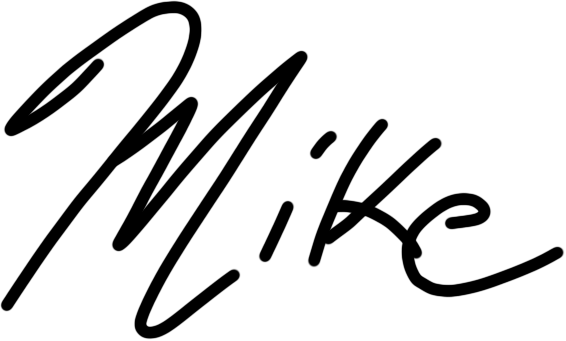
- Signature
- Website: House website Campaign website

Michael James Baumgartner (/ˈbɑːmɡɑːrtnər/ BAHM-gart-nər, born December 13, 1975) is an American politician and former diplomat serving as the U.S. representative from Washington's 5th congressional district since 2025. Previously, he served as the 28th Spokane County treasurer from 2019 to 2025 and as a member of the Washington State Senate from 2011 to 2019, representing the 6th district. He is a member of the Republican Party.

Baumgartner was first elected to Congress in 2024. He was previously a candidate for U.S. Senate in 2012.

== Early life, education, and career ==
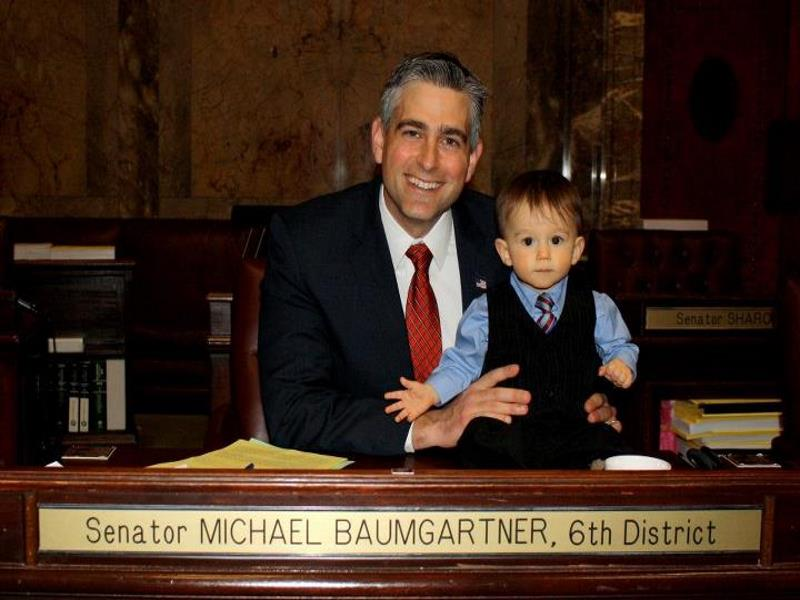
State Senator Michael Baumgartner, with his son, Conrad.

Baumgartner was born in Pullman. His mother is a kindergarten teacher and his father was a professor of Forestry and Natural Resource Sciences. After graduating from Pullman High School, he earned a scholarship to attend Washington State University. There, he was awarded a Thomas Foley scholarship, and was named a Stephenson scholar, an award given to the top graduates from the Honors College. He graduated in 1999 with a degree in economics with minors in French and mathematics. In 2002, he earned a master's degree in public administration from Harvard University.

After graduating from Harvard, Baumgartner, a Catholic, volunteered on a Gonzaga Jesuit mission to Mozambique and studied forests in Siberia.

During the Iraq War, he served as an economics officer in the Office of Joint Strategic Planning & Assessment (JSPA) at the United States Embassy in Baghdad helping the Iraqi government as part of the Baghdad Security Plan, receiving accolades from then General David Petraeus as well as Ambassador Ryan Crocker. In 2008, he spent 7 months working as a civilian contractor in the Helmand Province of Afghanistan. That same year, Boston Globe columnist Kevin Cullen referred to Baumgartner as an ‘architect of hope’ in Iraq.

After leaving Iraq, Baumgartner worked as a civilian contractor in Helmand Province, Afghanistan, where he encouraged poppy farmers to grow food instead, in an effort to combat the opioid epidemic. He met his wife Eleanor Mayne, a journalist studying counternarcotics in Helmand Province, and the two were married in 2010.

== Washington State Senate ==
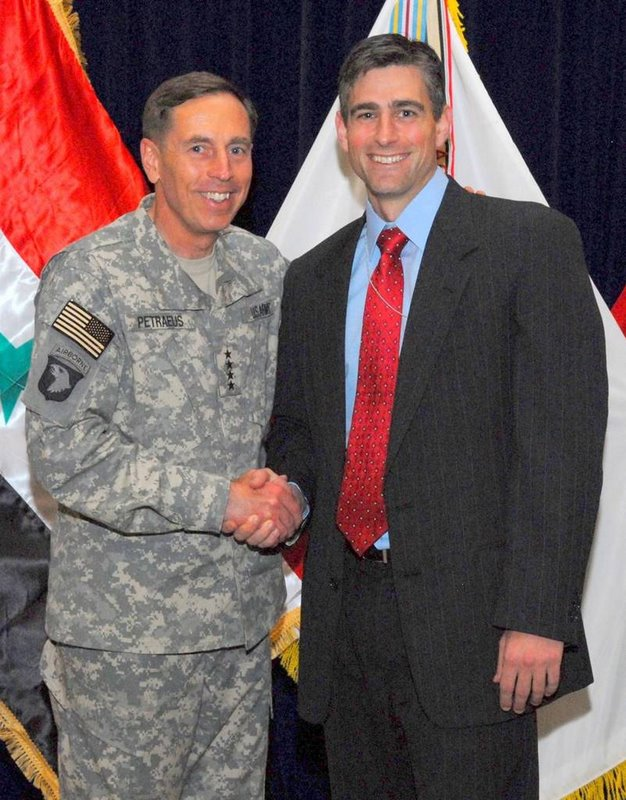
State Senator Baumgartner and former General David Petraeus, August 28, 2009

=== Elections ===
In 2010, Baumgartner returned to Eastern Washington and was planning a trip with his future wife Eleanor “to see if we actually like each other," when he was approached by Cathy McMorris Rodgers' Chief of Staff and future Spokane Mayor David Condon, who recruited him to run against incumbent Democratic State Senator and Majority Whip Chris Marr for the Washington State Senate 6th Legislative District seat. On August 17, 2010, in the state primary election, Baumgartner defeated Marr with 53% of the vote. In the November election, he officially defeated Marr with 54% of the vote. The election battle between Marr and Baumgartner is considered the most hotly contested and expensive state legislative races in Washington state history.

=== Tenure ===
In the state senate, Baumgartner represented parts of the City of Spokane, Airway Heights, and Cheney including Eastern Washington University.

In 2012, he was named one of the National Federation of Independent Business's Guardians of Business, the highest award they offer, in recognition of his votes that side "100 Percent" with small businesses. The Association of Washington Business awarded him their 'Cornerstone Award' also, in recognition of his support for employers, economic development, and business-related issues in the Washington State Legislature.

During his tenure, Baumgartner pushed to improve infrastructure in Eastern Washington, including securing the $900 million funding needed to complete the north–south corridor route first proposed sixty years ago, being the sole local Republican to support the major transportation package, helping lead successful efforts to build a new medical school in Spokane which addressed physician shortages in underserved and rural areas of Eastern Washington, which contributed to boosting healthcare economy jobs growth. The medical school, which was directed to be spearheaded by Washington State University, was originally blocked due to a 100-year old law that had given the University of Washington a monopoly on training doctors in the state. Baumgartner lead efforts to repeal the law, ultimately being successful in 2015.

Baumgartner considered public education a top priority during his tenure and led efforts to halt increases and reduce tuition for public universities by 20% in Washington State in 2015, including the University of Washington and Washington State University. It is currently the largest successful tuition reduction in the country's history. He has consistently fought for charter schools, which received significant opposition from the Washington State teachers' union Washington Education Association.

In 2016, he intervened in the expulsion of an American Samoan student, Robert Barber, from Washington State University. Barber had been only one credit short of a college degree when he was accused of involvement in a brawl. Baumgartner told a meeting of WSU regents: "If you don't fix this, I goddamn will." Barber was reinstated to the student body, and was later found innocent of all criminal charges.

During the 2016 presidential election primaries, Baumgartner chaired Scott Walker's campaign for president in the state of Washington.

In February 2018, Baumgartner was one of a handful of Washington State legislators to vote against a bill that would have exempted legislators from public records rules.

In 2018, he received the Champion of Freedom award from the Washington Policy Center.

At the 2018 legislative session conclusion, Baumgartner introduced a satirical resolution calling for April 1 to be celebrated as "Governor Jay Inslee Integrity Day", mocking the Governor for his about-turn on vetoing public records legislation.

=== Committee assignments ===
In 2011 and 2012, Baumgartner was the ranking minority member of the Economic Development Trade & Innovation Committee, served on the Ways & Means Committee, and the Higher Education & Workforce Development Committee.

In 2013, two Democrats joined with the 23 Republicans to form the Majority Coalition Caucus. With the new coalition, Baumgartner was named Vice-Chairman of the Senate Ways and Means Committee, and was also assigned to the Senate Trade and Economic Development Committee, the Higher Education Committee, and the Human Services and Corrections Committee.

== 2012 U.S. Senate election ==
In October 2011, Baumgartner decided to challenge incumbent U.S. Senator Maria Cantwell (D-WA). Cantwell was running for her third term. Washington uses a "top-two" nonpartisan blanket primary system, in which the top two candidates of any party in the primary election advance to the general election. Cantwell and Baumgartner finished first and second, respectively, and competed in the general election.

Baumgartner has formally endorsed Washington Initiative 502 to legalize, regulate and tax marijuana for adults 21 and over, making him the first and only candidate for statewide office in Washington state to do so, and taking a position that wasn't popular in his party.

In the November general election, Cantwell defeated Baumgartner. Cantwell received over 60% of the vote, to Baumgarter's near-40%.

== Spokane County Treasurer ==
In 2018, Baumgartner opted not to run for reelection to the State Senate. Instead, he chose to run for Spokane County Treasurer. He won the November election and took office in January 2019. He was unopposed for reelection in 2022.

== U.S. House of Representatives ==
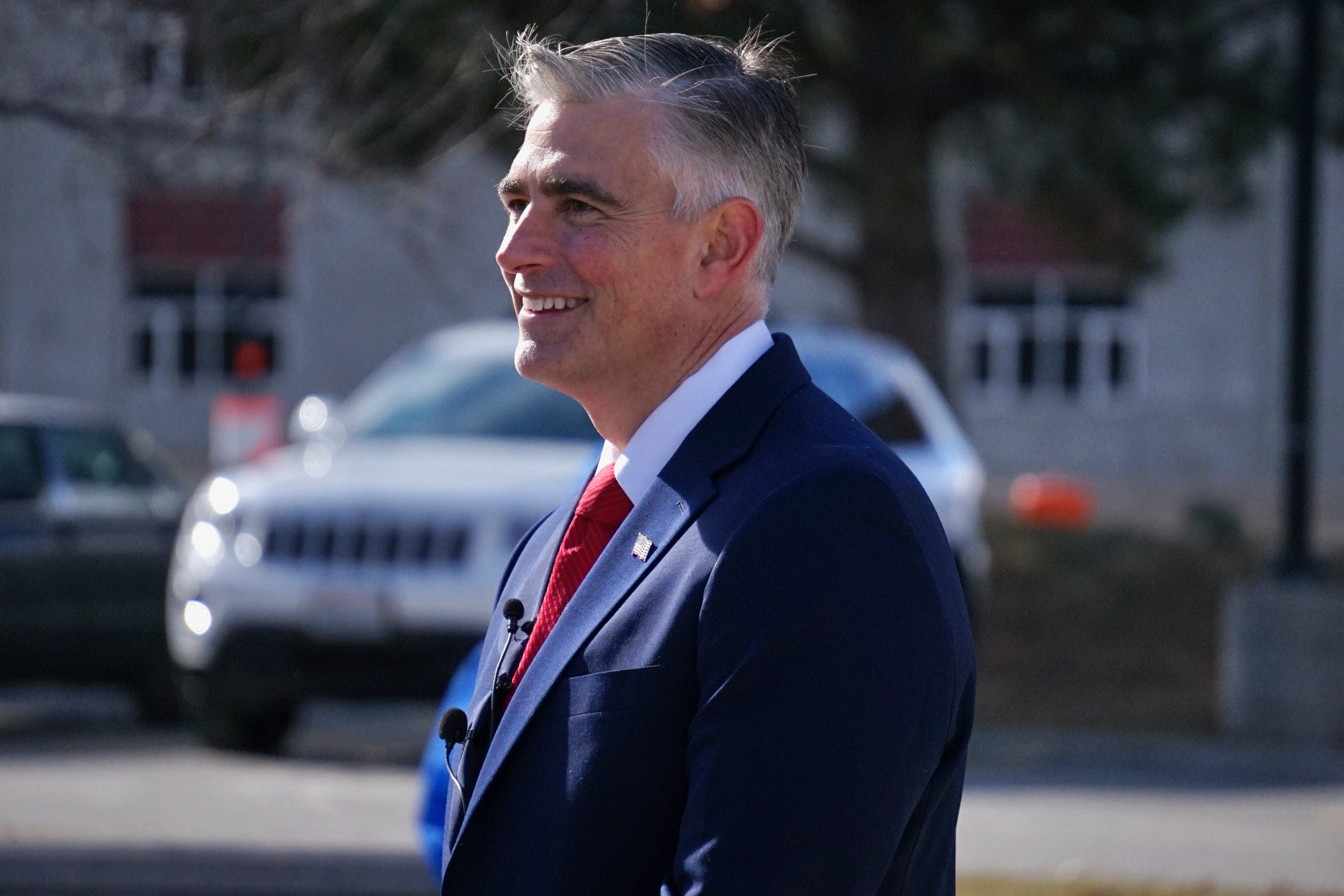
Baumgartner announcing his run for Washington's 5th congressional district.

=== Elections ===
==== 2024 ====
On February 26, 2024, shortly after incumbent Congresswoman Cathy McMorris-Rodgers announced she would not seek re-election, Baumgartner announced he would run for Washington's 5th congressional district. While no public polling was conducted, Baumgartner was largely seen as the early favorite for the Republican nomination. On August 6, 2024, Baumgartner won the primary for the open seat, placing first, with Democrat Carmela Conroy placing second. He received 28.4% of the vote to Conroy's 19.5%

On November 5, 2024, Baumgartner officially won the race for the district with over 60% of the vote. Notably, he outperformed predecessor Cathy McMorris Rogers' result in 2022, despite not being an incumbent. He was the best performing Republican out of any candidate in the state, both federally and statewide.

=== Tenure ===
In 2025, Baumgartner founded the bipartisan Congressional College Sports Caucus. He introduced the "Restore College Sports Act" with the aim of dissolving the National Collegiate Athletic Association and replacing it with the "American College Sports Association," which the federal government would oversee.

In March 2025, Baumgartner joined Jim Jordan and Tom McClintock in a letter challenging Washington Attorney General Nick Brown and the state sanctuary law, which restricts local police from enforcing federal immigration policy. The letter follows accusations from the attorney general against Adams County sheriff's office for unlawful imprisonment based solely on immigration status.

In September 2025, Baumgartner visited China as part of a bipartisan delegation led by Adam Smith, where he met Premier Li Qiang, Foreign Minister Wang Yi, Defense Minister Dong Jun and other high-ranking Chinese officials.

In June 2026, Baumgartner introduced the Power and Water for Families Act, which would force data centers and other high-load facilities to cover the full cost of the power and water systems needed to serve them in an effort to ensure that such projects do not increase electricity rates.

=== Committee assignments ===
For the 119th Congress:

- Committee on Education and Workforce
  - Subcommittee on Health, Employment, Labor, and Pensions
  - Subcommittee on Higher Education and Workforce Development (Vice Chair)
- Committee on Foreign Affairs
  - Subcommittee on the Middle East and North Africa
  - Subcommittee on South and Central Asia
- Committee on the Judiciary
  - Subcommittee on the Administrative State, Regulatory Reform, and Antitrust
  - Subcommittee on Courts, Intellectual Property, Artificial Intelligence, and the Internet

=== Caucus memberships ===
- Congressional Western Caucus
- Republican Governance Group
- Republican Study Committee
- Republican Main Street Partnership

== Personal life ==
Baumgartner and his wife Eleanor have three sons and two daughters. In early 2018, they lost their fifth baby after suffering a late miscarriage.

Baumgartner maintained a close friendship with Washington State University football coach Mike Leach throughout his life. Leach and Baumgartner taught a course together at WSU titled "Leadership Lessons in Insurgent Warfare & Football Strategy," designed to "explore strategy and tactics common in both Guerilla Warfare and college football to provide a backdrop for critical thinking."

== Electoral history ==
=== 2010 state senate ===
Washington State Senate election from the 6th District, 2010
Party	Candidate	Votes	%
Republican	Michael Baumgartner	33,929	54
Democratic	Chris Marr (Incumbent)	29,237	46

=== 2012 U.S. Senate ===
Results by county: Cantwell: 30–40%; 40–50%; 50–60%; 60–70%; Baumgartner: 40–50%; 50–60%

Blanket primary results
Party	Candidate	Votes	%
Democratic	Maria Cantwell (incumbent)	626,360	55.42
Republican	Michael Baumgartner	344,729	30.50
Republican	Art Coday	59,255	5.24
Democratic	Timothy Wilson	26,850	2.38
Republican	Chuck Jackson	21,870	1.94
Republican	Glenn R. Stockwell	21,731	1.92
Republican	Mike the Mover	16,459	1.46
Reform	Will Baker	12,865	1.14
Total votes		1,130,119	100.00

United States Senate election in Washington, 2012
Party	Candidate	Votes	%
Democratic	Maria Cantwell (incumbent)	1,855,493	60.45%
Republican	Michael Baumgartner	1,213,924	39.55%
Total votes		3,069,417	100.00%

=== 2014 state senate ===
Washington State Senate election from the 6th District, 2014
Party	Candidate	Votes	%
Republican	Michael Baumgartner	28,309	57.5
Democratic	Rich Cowan	20,949	42.7

=== 2018 Spokane County Treasurer ===
Spokane County Treasurer election, 2018
Party	Candidate	Votes	%
Republican	Michael Baumgartner	126,421	57.5
Democratic	David Green	93,516	42.5

=== 2022 Spokane County Treasurer ===
Spokane County Treasurer election, 2022
Party	Candidate	Votes	%
Republican	Michael Baumgartner	152,682	95.9
Write-in		6,463	4

=== 2024 U.S. House ===
Results by county Baumgartner: 30–40%; 20–30%; Maycumber: 30–40%; 20–30%; Dansel: 20–30%

Blanket primary results
Party	Candidate	Votes	%
Republican	Michael Baumgartner	35,371	28.4
Democratic	Carmela Conroy	24,342	19.5
Republican	Jacquelin Maycumber	15,245	12.2
Democratic	Bernadine Bank	14,729	11.8
Republican	Brian Dansel	12,301	9.9
Democratic	Ann Marie Danimus	7,039	5.7
Republican	Jonathan Bingle	4,240	3.4
Republican	Rene Holaday	3,622	2.9
Republican	Rick Flynn	3,204	2.6
Democratic	Matthew Welde	2,793	2.2
Democratic	Bobbi Bennett-Wolcott	1,619	1.3
Write-in		121	0.1
Total votes		124,626	100.0

General election results
Party	Candidate	Votes	%
Republican	Michael Baumgartner	240,619	60.6
Democratic	Carmela Conroy	156,074	39.3
Write-in		593	0.1
Total votes		397,286	100.0

Party political offices
Preceded by Mike McGavick	Republican nominee for U.S. Senator from Washington (Class 1); 2012	Succeeded by Susan Hutchison
U.S. House of Representatives
Preceded by Cathy McMorris Rodgers	Member of the U.S. House of Representatives from Washington's 5th congressional district 2025–present	Incumbent
U.S. order of precedence (ceremonial)
Preceded by Tom Barrett	United States representatives by seniority 366th	Succeeded by Nick Begich III
