= Maria Cantwell =

American politician (born 1958)

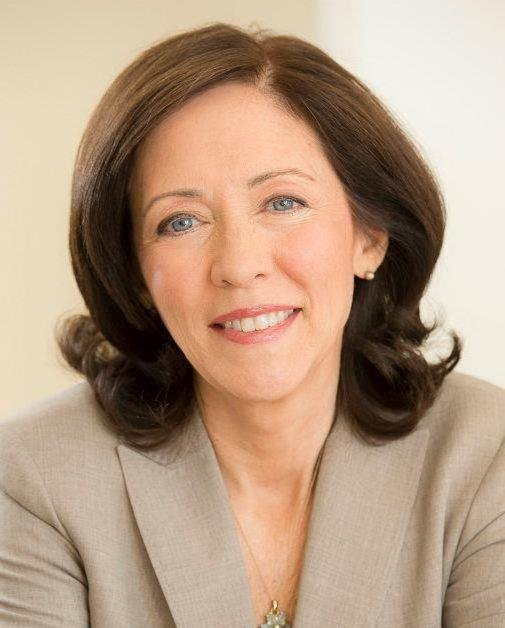
- Official portrait, 2018

United States Senator from Washington
- Incumbent
- Assumed office January 3, 2001 Serving with Patty Murray
- Preceded by: Slade Gorton
Committee positions
Ranking Member of the Senate Commerce Committee
Incumbent
Assumed office January 3, 2025
Preceded by	Ted Cruz
In office January 3, 2019 – February 3, 2021
Preceded by	Bill Nelson
Succeeded by	Roger Wicker
Chair of the Senate Commerce Committee
In office February 3, 2021 – January 3, 2025
Preceded by	Roger Wicker
Succeeded by	Ted Cruz
Ranking Member of the Senate Energy Committee
In office January 3, 2015 – January 3, 2019
Preceded by	Lisa Murkowski
Succeeded by	Joe Manchin
Chair of the Senate Small Business Committee
In office February 12, 2014 – January 3, 2015
Preceded by	Mary Landrieu
Succeeded by	David Vitter
Chair of the Senate Indian Affairs Committee
In office January 3, 2013 – February 12, 2014
Preceded by	Daniel Akaka
Succeeded by	Jon Tester

Member of the U.S. House of Representatives from Washington's 1st district
- In office January 3, 1993 – January 3, 1995
- Preceded by: John Miller
- Succeeded by: Rick White

Member of the Washington House of Representatives from the 44th district
- In office January 12, 1987 – January 3, 1993
- Preceded by: Jeanine Long
- Succeeded by: Jeanine Long

Personal details
- Born: Maria Ellen Cantwell; October 13, 1958 (age 68) Indianapolis, Indiana, U.S.
- Party: Democratic
- Relatives: Paul Cantwell (father)
- Education: Miami University (BA)
- Website: Senate website Campaign website
- Cantwell's voice Cantwell on her constituents' lack of certainty and the mismanagement of Southwest Airlines; Recorded February 9, 2023

Maria Ellen Cantwell (/ˈkæntˌwɛl/; born October 13, 1958) is an American politician serving since 2001 as the junior U.S. senator from Washington. A member of the Democratic Party, she served from 1987 to 1993 in the Washington House of Representatives and from 1993 to 1995 in the United States House of Representatives.

Born and raised in Indianapolis, Indiana, Cantwell graduated from Miami University before moving to Seattle to work on Alan Cranston's 1984 presidential campaign. In 1986, she was elected to the state house of representatives, where she served until her election to Congress in 1992. Cantwell served one term in Congress before losing her seat to Republican Rick White in the 1994 election. She then briefly worked in the private sector as vice president of marketing for RealNetworks.

Despite having vowed to remain out of politics, Cantwell ran for the U.S. Senate in 2000. She defeated Republican incumbent Slade Gorton in one of the closest elections in the state's history. Cantwell was reelected in 2006, 2012, 2018, and 2024. After Jeff Sessions resigned from the Senate in February 2017 to become United States Attorney General, Cantwell became the most senior junior senator. She is the second female senator from Washington, after Patty Murray.

== Early life, education, and early political career ==
Cantwell was born in Indianapolis, Indiana. She was raised in a predominantly Irish American neighborhood on the south side of Indianapolis. Her father, Paul Cantwell, served as county commissioner, city councilor, state legislator, and chief of staff for U.S. Representative Andrew Jacobs Jr. and was the Democratic nominee for mayor of Indianapolis in 1979. Her mother, Rose, was an administrative assistant. Her ancestry includes Irish and German.

Cantwell attended Emmerich Manual High School, and was inducted into the Indianapolis Public Schools Hall of Fame in 2006. After high school, she attended Miami University in Oxford, Ohio, where she earned her Bachelor of Arts degree in public administration.

A year after graduating, Cantwell worked on Jerry Springer's unsuccessful 1982 Ohio gubernatorial campaign. In 1983, she moved to Seattle, Washington, to campaign for U.S. Senator Alan Cranston in his unsuccessful bid for the 1984 Democratic presidential nomination. She then moved to the Seattle suburb of Mountlake Terrace, because it reminded her of Indianapolis, and led a successful campaign in 1986 to build a new library there. As of 2000, Cantwell lived in Edmonds, Washington with her mother.

== Washington House of Representatives (1987–1993) ==
=== Elections ===
In 1986, Cantwell was elected to the Washington State House of Representatives, defeating George Dahlquist 54%–46%. In 1988, she was reelected with 66% of the vote. In 1990, she was reelected to a third term with 61% of the vote.

=== Tenure ===
As a state representative, Cantwell helped write Washington's Growth Management Act of 1990, which required cities to develop comprehensive growth plans, and negotiated its passage. She also worked on legislation regulating nursing homes. Cantwell resigned on January 3, 1993, in preparation to be sworn in as a member of the United States House of Representatives.

== U.S. House of Representatives (1993–1995) ==
=== Elections ===
1992

In the November election, Cantwell defeated Republican State Senator Gary A. Nelson 55%–42%. She became the first Democrat elected to the United States House of Representatives from Washington's first congressional district in 40 years.

1994

Republican Rick White defeated Cantwell 52%–48% in the 1994 United States House of Representatives elections. Before that year's "Republican Revolution", eight of the nine representatives from the Washington state delegation were from the Democratic Party. After the election, five Democratic representatives from Washington state lost their campaigns for reelection, including Cantwell, future governor Jay Inslee, and Speaker of the House Tom Foley.

=== Tenure ===
Cantwell was called a "savvy, pro-business Democrat". She supported President Clinton's 1993 budget, which raised taxes and passed without the votes of many Democrats. During her only term, she helped persuade the Clinton administration to terminate its support of the Clipper chip. She wrote Vice President Al Gore a letter staunchly opposing it because Microsoft was in her district. She voted for the North American Free Trade Agreement (NAFTA).

In 1993, Cantwell became one of the first three women to play in the annual Congressional Baseball Game, alongside Blanche Lincoln (then under her maiden name Lambert) and Ileana Ros-Lehtinen.

=== Committee assignments ===
- Public Works
- Foreign Affairs
- Merchant Marine and Fisheries

== Private sector employment (1995–1999) ==
After her defeat, Cantwell vowed to leave politics. Political ally Rob Glaser offered her a job as vice president of marketing for RealNetworks. Among her accomplishments was the live internet streaming broadcast of a Mariners-Yankees baseball game in 1995, which marked the start of internet broadcasts of Major League Baseball games.

In 1998, the company was criticized by privacy groups, which alleged that the RealJukebox software program incorporated spyware to track unsuspecting users' listening patterns and download history. In response, RealNetworks amended its privacy policy to fully disclose its privacy practices regarding user listening patterns and subsequently submitted to independent outside audits of its privacy practices. Several lawsuits regarding alleged privacy violations were settled out of court. This incident shaped her views on privacy and her opposition to the Bush administration's post-9/11 policies.

== U.S. Senate (2001–present) ==
=== Elections ===
==== 2000 ====
At the urging of party activists and officials, Cantwell formed an exploratory committee in October 1999 to consider a run for U.S. Senate against Democrat Insurance Commissioner Deborah Senn and incumbent Republican Senator Slade Gorton. She committed to the race on January 19, 2000. Cantwell entered the campaign a year after Senn, who was endorsed by the Washington State Labor Council and NARAL, and used her personal wealth to fund television advertisements. Early on, privacy became an issue; Senn cited her record protecting medical privacy as insurance commissioner, while Cantwell promoted internet privacy and cited her opposition to the Clipper chip. Senn later used television advertisements to accuse Cantwell of avoiding debates, as she had agreed to two debates while Senn preferred more. They participated in three debates, during which they attacked each other. Senn attacked RealNetworks and Cantwell's role in the company; Cantwell accused Senn of wanting to run against RealNetworks, and said that Senn was uninformed on internet issues. Cantwell was endorsed by The Seattle Times, the Seattle Post-Intelligencer, The Spokesman-Review, and The News Tribune. She won the nomination, defeating Senn by a 3–1 margin in the primary. Although he won re-nomination, Gorton got fewer votes than Cantwell and Senn's combined total.

Social security, prescription drugs, dams, gun control, and campaign finance reform were among the most important issues in Cantwell's race against Gorton, which drew national attention. Cantwell also adopted the slogan "Your voice for a change", a veiled reference to Gorton's campaign theme in 1980, challenging incumbent Warren Magnuson's age. She said Gorton supported "19th-century solutions to 21st-century problems". Cantwell was endorsed by The Seattle Times and the Seattle Post-Intelligencer, the state's two biggest newspapers. Gorton was endorsed by the smaller The News Tribune and two of the largest Eastern Washington newspapers, The Spokesman-Review and Tri-City Herald. At times, the campaign was accused of pettiness as national PACs and groups funded television attack ads. After a Cantwell campaign worker deep-linked to a humorous photo on Gorton's website, he accused Cantwell's campaign of hacking, and Senn accused Cantwell of hypocrisy. "Fiddling with people's websites and calling it good fun ... adds a very childish and unworthy character to the race", Senn's campaign spokeswoman Barbara Stenson said. Cantwell spent over $10 million of her own money on her campaign, pledging not to accept money from PACs. When RealNetworks stock declined at the end of 2000, she spent time raising funds for debt retirement, but kept her pledge not to accept PAC money. In the waning weeks of the campaign, the Federal Election Commission ruled that Cantwell violated federal campaign finance law by securing $3.8 million in bank loans for her campaign and failing to properly disclose the loans until January 30, 2001. The complaint alleged she had received a $600,000 line of credit without sufficient collateral, and another $1,000,000, all at a preferential interest rate. After review, the Federal Election Commission sent a letter of admonishment, saying that the loans were "made on a basis that assures repayment, and that each loan bore the usual and customary interest rate".

The election was among the closest in Washington history. Cantwell had a tiny lead in the initial returns on election night, but the race remained too close to call. Gorton overtook her the next day, amassing a 12,500-vote lead by the second week of absentee ballot counting. The election result was certified on November 22 with Cantwell leading by 1,953 votes out of 2.5 million cast, credited to support from the Puget Sound region. The 0.08% margin triggered an automatic recount, which increased her lead to 2,229 votes, or 0.09%. It was the last Senate race to be called in the 2000 election, which resulted in a 50–50 tie ahead of a contentious presidential election recount. Cantwell and Debbie Stabenow of Michigan became the third and fourth women to defeat incumbent senators, after Kay Bailey Hutchison's 1993 and Dianne Feinstein's 1992 special-election victories.

==== 2006 ====
The close 2004 gubernatorial race between Democrat Christine Gregoire and Republican Dino Rossi suggested to many that the 2006 contest might also be close. Cantwell and Republican nominee Mike McGavick dominated their primaries; initial speculation favored a Republican victory. "At one point", wrote analyst Larry Sabato, "all the talk in this race concerned Cantwell's cool relations with anti-war Democratic elements and McGavick's relatively united base. But Democrats appear to have closed ranks behind their junior senator." Cantwell was reelected by a 17-point margin, even winning several traditionally Republican counties in Eastern Washington, including Spokane County.

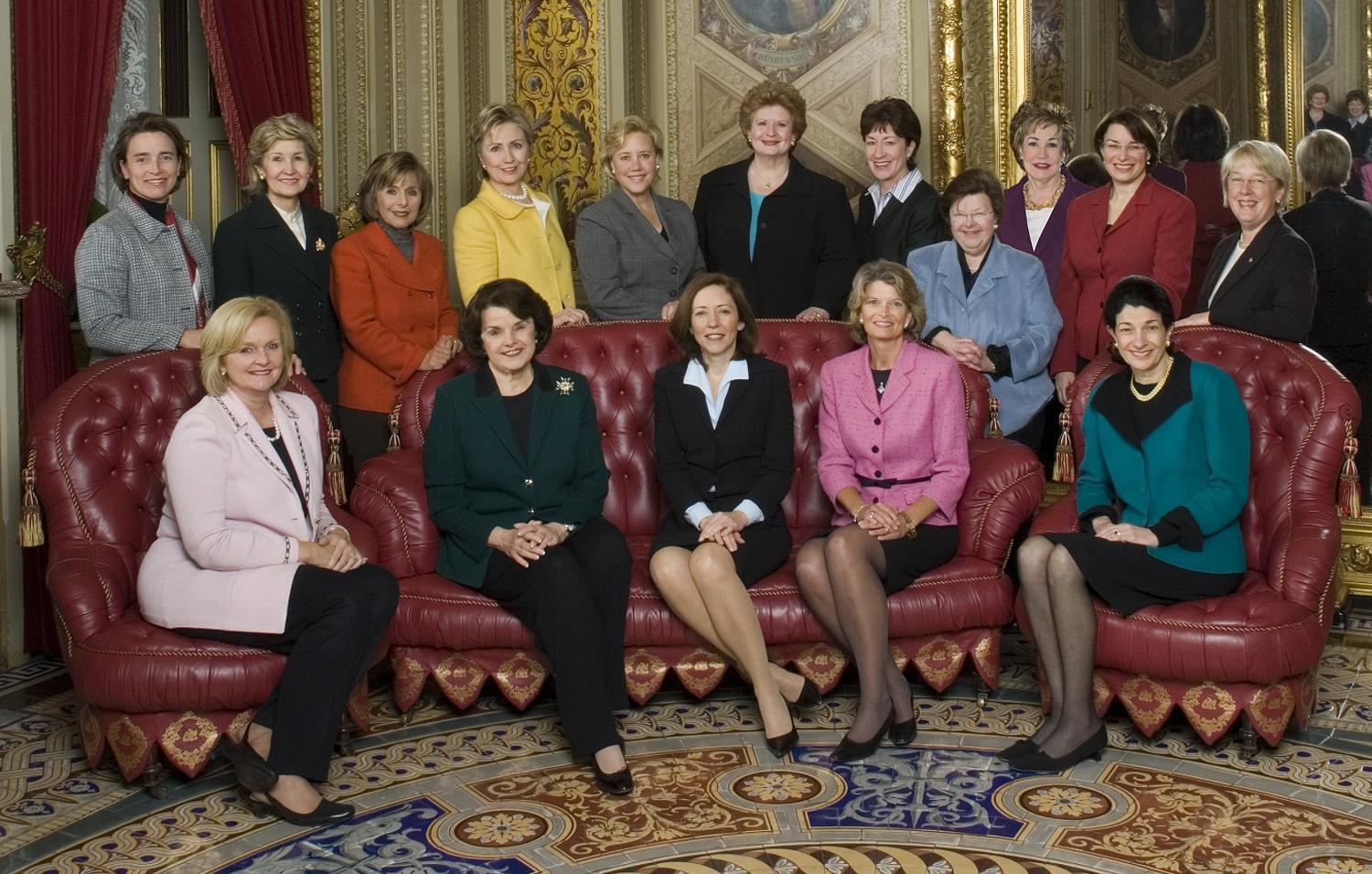
Cantwell (seated in the middle of the couch) with other female Senators of the 110th Congress, which served from 2007 until 2009.

During the campaign, Cantwell was heavily criticized for declining most of the invitations she received to debate McGavick in public fora. Media outlets across the state, including The Olympian and the Yakima Herald-Republic, rebuked her, claiming she was afraid to confront McGavick and calling it "unacceptable" and "simply not fair". Cantwell agreed to two debates with McGavick in Seattle and Spokane, lasting 60 and 30 minutes, respectively. When she ran for Senate in 2000 against Gorton, Gorton also agreed to only two debates of a similar format. Similarly, when Washington's senior senator, Patty Murray, ran for reelection in 2004, she agreed to only two debates with George Nethercutt, although each lasted an hour.

==== 2012 ====
Cantwell was reelected to a third term, defeating Republican State Senator Michael Baumgartner.

==== 2018 ====
Cantwell was reelected to a fourth term, defeating Republican Susan Hutchison.

==== 2024 ====
Cantwell was reelected to a fifth term, defeating Republican Raul Garcia.

=== Tenure ===
Cantwell was a proponent of the McCain-Feingold campaign finance reform bill of 2002, and co-sponsored the Clean Money, Clean Elections Act of 2001. In 2005, she wrote a letter in support of the Perkins Loan program, and in July 2006 she told the Seattle Times she opposed Social Security privatization. Cantwell co-sponsored the "Pension Fairness and Full Disclosure Act of 2005".

Also in 2005, Cantwell voted for the Central America Free Trade Agreement (CAFTA), which angered many who opposed free trade agreements. Others argued that due to the state's unique economy, any senator from Washington almost had to vote for free trade pacts.

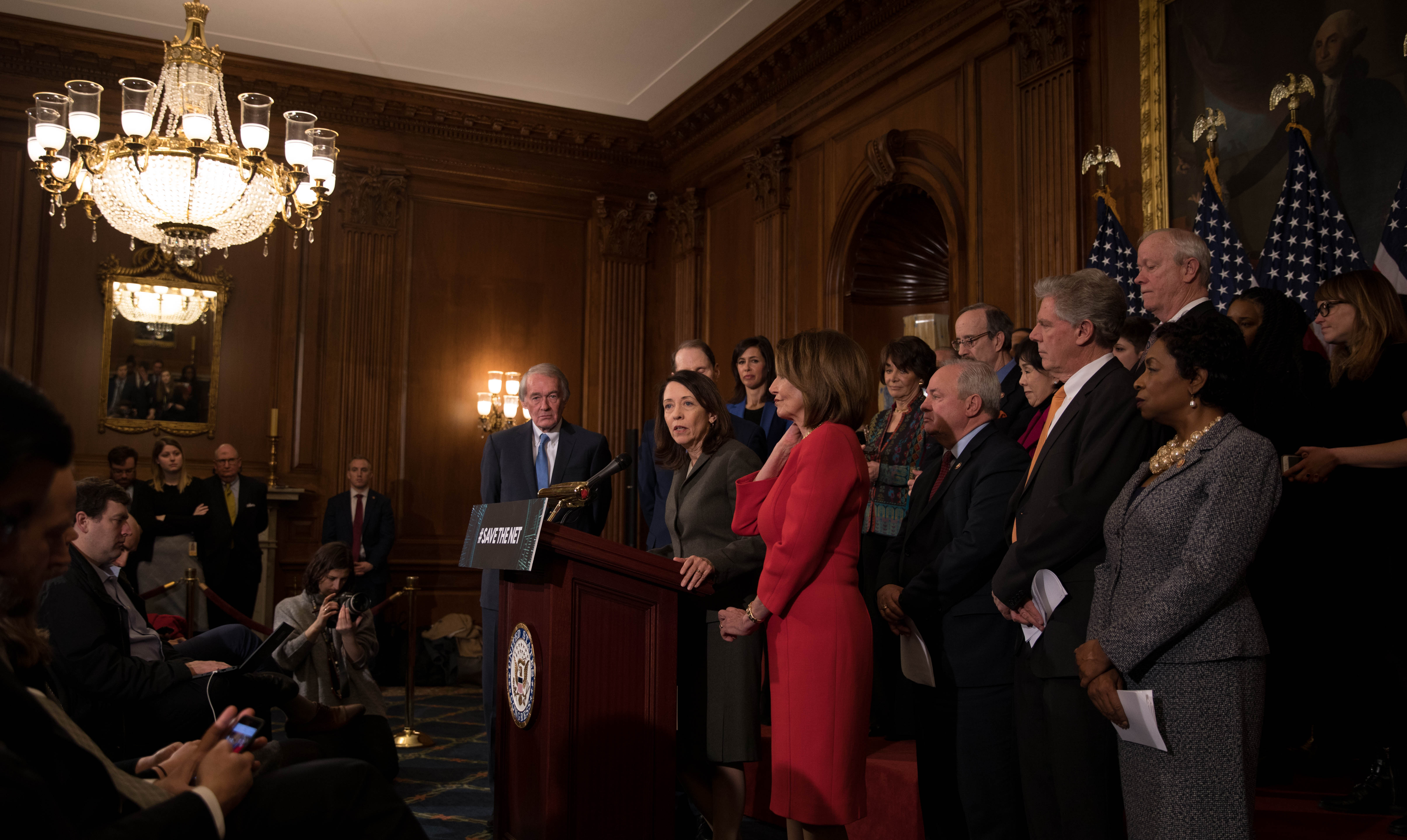
Cantwell responding to a question at a press conference in 2019.

Cantwell was one of 22 senators to vote not to confirm United States Supreme Court nominee John Roberts, citing his potential views on abortion and the environment. In January 2006, after publicly announcing her opposition to Supreme Court nominee Samuel Alito, Cantwell, 18 other Democrats and all 53 present Republicans, voted for the cloture motion. The success of this motion ended an unlikely attempt to filibuster Alito's confirmation led by Senators John Kerry and Ted Kennedy. Alito was confirmed the next day by a vote of 58–42, with most Democrats, including Cantwell, voting against confirmation.

In 2010, Cantwell voted to invoke cloture to begin debate on the Don't ask, don't tell policy in the military.

In the 2016 United States presidential election, Cantwell received one electoral vote for vice president from a faithless elector in Washington.

Cantwell has led efforts to improve internet privacy laws.

In 2024, Cantwell crafted legislation to require airline passengers to request a refund for a canceled flight rather than automatically receiving one.

==== Abortion and contraceptives ====
Cantwell has expressed support for making Plan B contraceptives available to girls 16 and under. In 2007, she co-sponsored the Prevention First Act, a bill that sought to increase national access to family planning and preventative methods as a means to reduce unwanted pregnancies. It included giving women access to Plan B, as well as expanding Medicaid to cover family planning. As an advocate of increasing access to family planning and sexual health education, Cantwell argues that these venues for increased education are necessary to reduce unwanted pregnancies. She was criticized by her Republican challenger, State Senator Michael Baumgartner, who suggested that she was too extreme and too far to the left of Washington voters on this issue, and expressed concern about 11-year-olds getting these drugs without a prescription.

Cantwell calls herself "100% pro-choice", and consistently supports the pro-choice movement's positions. She was one of 34 senators to vote against the Partial-Birth Abortion Ban Act of 2003, which President George W. Bush signed into law. She also voted against the Unborn Victims of Violence Act, which made it an additional crime to kill or harm a fetus during a criminal assault upon the mother. That bill passed the Senate by a vote of 61–38, and was signed into law by Bush in 2004.

==== Environment and energy ====
Cantwell opposed drilling in the Arctic National Wildlife Refuge (ANWR), and was one of the most vocal critics of the increase of oil and gasoline prices during 2008. Advocating increased regulation of futures markets and windfall profits taxes on oil profits, she has drawn scathing criticism from the Wall Street Journal. In 2005, Cantwell scored what many perceived as one of the biggest victories of her first term when she blocked Senator Ted Stevens's efforts to allow drilling in ANWR. Stevens attached the measure to a bill that provided money for defense spending and Hurricane Katrina recovery efforts. Cantwell rounded up the votes of 41 Democrats (Note: Including one independent who caucused with the Democrats.) and three Republicans, enough to block a final vote. Stevens removed the ANWR drilling measure from the larger bill, promising to bring the matter up at a later date.

In 2004, Cantwell received the highest rating possible from the League of Conservation Voters for her environmental voting record. As of 2020, she has a lifetime score of 93% on the League's National Environmental Scorecard. She is known for supporting alternative energy research and for protecting Washington's forests from logging and the construction of paved roads and has been endorsed by various prominent environmental advocacy groups. She has opposed drilling in ANWR on multiple occasions, has voted to reduce oil usage by 40% by 2025, and has opposed legislation to relax or terminate CAFE standards. The Seattle Times has called Cantwell's environmental record "pristine", and the Wilderness Society has called her an "environmental champion".

In 2009, Cantwell introduced the Carbon Limits and Energy for America's Renewal (CLEAR) Act (S. 2877), also called the Cantwell-Collins bill, a "cap and dividend" emissions trading proposal. Senator Susan Collins co-sponsored it. The bill died in the Senate Finance Committee without debate or votes.

Cantwell chaired the Senate Democrats 20/20 Energy Independence campaign and co-chaired the Apollo Alliance in 2006. One of her main accomplishments was the passage of an amendment "To prevent energy market manipulation", which passed 57–40 in the Senate in November 2006; a previous effort was defeated by a vote of 50–48.

In 2011, The Humane Society of the United States praised Cantwell's no-tolerance policy and effective removal of the practice of shark finning, which kills an estimated 73 million sharks per year.

In February 2019, in response to reports that the EPA intended to decide against setting limits for perfluorooctane sulfonic acid (PFOS) and perfluorooctanoic acid (PFOA) in drinking water as part of an upcoming national strategy to manage the chemicals, Cantwell was one of 20 senators to sign a letter to Acting EPA Administrator Andrew R. Wheeler calling on the EPA "to develop enforceable federal drinking water standards for PFOA and PFOS, as well as institute immediate actions to protect the public from contamination from additional per- and polyfluoroalkyl substances (PFAS)."

In September 2019, Cantwell was one of eight senators to sign a bipartisan letter to congressional leadership requesting full and lasting funding of the Land and Water Conservation Act to aid national parks and public lands, benefit the $887 billion American outdoor recreation economy, and "ensure much-needed investment in our public lands and continuity for the state, tribal, and non-federal partners who depend on them".

==== Foreign policy ====
===== Criticism of Amanda Knox's wrongful conviction =====
On December 4, 2009, the day that an Italian court wrongly convicted 22-year-old Washingtonian Amanda Knox of the murder of Meredith Kercher, Cantwell released a statement expressing her dismay, saying she had "serious questions about the Italian justice system and whether anti-Americanism tainted [the] trial". She called the evidence against Knox insufficient, said Knox had been subjected to "harsh treatment" after her arrest, and said there had been "negligence" in the handling of evidence. She also complained that jurors had not been sequestered, allowing them to view "negative news coverage" about Knox, and that one of the prosecutors had a misconduct case pending in relation to another trial. Cantwell said she would seek Secretary of State Hillary Clinton's assistance. A State Department spokesman said in December 2009 that the department had followed the case closely and would continue to do so. He added: "It is still in the early days but ... we haven't received any indications necessarily that Italian law was not followed." Knox was later exonerated.

===== Iraq War =====
On October 11, 2002, Cantwell voted in favor of the Joint Resolution to Authorize the Use of United States Armed Forces Against Iraq. Her October 10, 2002, press release quoted her as saying on the Senate floor, "my vote for this resolution does not mean that I am convinced of the Administration has answered all the questions. I believe the following issues must be addressed before the U.N. or the U.S. move forward with military action." Cantwell detailed six specific areas in which her questions and concerns had yet to be satisfactorily addressed at the time of her vote to authorize war: "First: Continued Multilateral Approach ... Second: Successful Military Strategy ... Third: A Post-War Commitment Strategy ... Fourth: Fighting the Broader War on Terrorism ... Fifth: Maintaining Middle East Stability ... Sixth: Protecting Iraqi Civilians."

In 2006, Cantwell voted against the Kerry-Feingold Amendment to S. 2766, which would have set a timetable for withdrawal, but for the Levin-Reed Amendment, which would encourage beginning a phased withdrawal by the end of the year, with no timetable for completion.

===== Israel =====
In April 2017, Cantwell co-sponsored the Israel Anti-Boycott Act (S.270), which would have made it a federal crime, punishable by a maximum sentence of 20 years' imprisonment, for Americans to encourage or participate in boycotts against Israel and Israeli settlements in the occupied Palestinian territories if protesting actions by the Israeli government.

After previously declining to support resolutions blocking the sale of arms to Israel in 2024 and 2025, Cantwell joined 39 other Senate Democrats in April 2026 in voting to block the sale of bombs and armored bulldozers to Israel.

==== Health care reform ====
Cantwell supports health care reform in the United States, and cosponsored Senator Ron Wyden's Healthy Americans Act. In her role as a member of the Finance Committee, she had an influential role in crafting health care reform legislation. On September 29, 2009, when the Finance Committee considered health care reform legislation, Cantwell supported amendments to establish a public health care option that would compete with private insurers.

In 2009, The Stranger ran an article on Cantwell's opposition to the inclusion of a public option in the health-care reform plan. They reported: "Seattle congressman Jim McDermott supports it. Washington senator Patty Murray wants it. So does President Barack Obama. So does the often conservative Seattle Times editorial page. So do 72 percent of Americans, according to a recent poll. So what's going on with Washington's junior senator, Maria Cantwell? Why doesn't she want Congress to include a public option—a new government-run health-care plan that will be available to everyone, and will compete with private insurance companies to bring down costs—in its health-care-reform package?" Cantwell cited her concerns with getting the bill through the Senate as the reason for her opposition.

==== LGBTQ+ rights ====
In 2022, Cantwell voted for the Respect for Marriage Act, legislation intended to codify same-sex marriage rights into federal law.

==== Immigration ====
In 2006, Cantwell, along with 38 of 44 Senate Democrats, voted for the Comprehensive Immigration Reform Act of 2006 (S. 2611). This legislation included provisions to improve border security, increased fines and other punishments for employers of illegal immigrants, created a guest worker program (which included a near doubling of the number of H1-B visas), and created a path to citizenship for illegal immigrants already in the country. The bill, with support from Republican leadership, passed 62–36. Debate would have also commenced on the DREAM Act, but was halted by a Republican filibuster.

In 2025, Cantwell signed a letter from Patty Murray's office to ICE Director Todd Lyons that cited explicit concerns about the treatment of immigrants at the Tacoma detention center.

==== Minimum wage ====
In March 2021, Cantwell was among the 42 Democrats to vote unsuccessfully to include a $15 hourly minimum wage in the American Rescue Plan.

==== Sexual abuse in Olympic sports ====
Cantwell chairs the Senate Commerce, Science, and Transportation Committee, which has jurisdiction over the United States Olympic & Paralympic Committee (USOPC), the United States Center for SafeSport (SafeSport), and the issue of sexual abuse in Olympic sports. She has praised the Protecting Young Victims from Sexual Abuse and Safe Sport Authorization Act of 2017, crafted to protect athletes from emotional and physical abuse and harassment, which created SafeSport to prevent and respond to misconduct.

==== Support for fellow Democrats ====
Cantwell is a major supporter of fellow Democratic candidates for public office. In 2006, facing her own challenging race, she used ActBlue to raise $100,000 for Darcy Burner, Peter J. Goldmark, and Richard Wright, all of whom were facing difficult House races in Washington. In the 2008 cycle, Cantwell was particularly committed to supporting Senator Mary Landrieu's reelection.

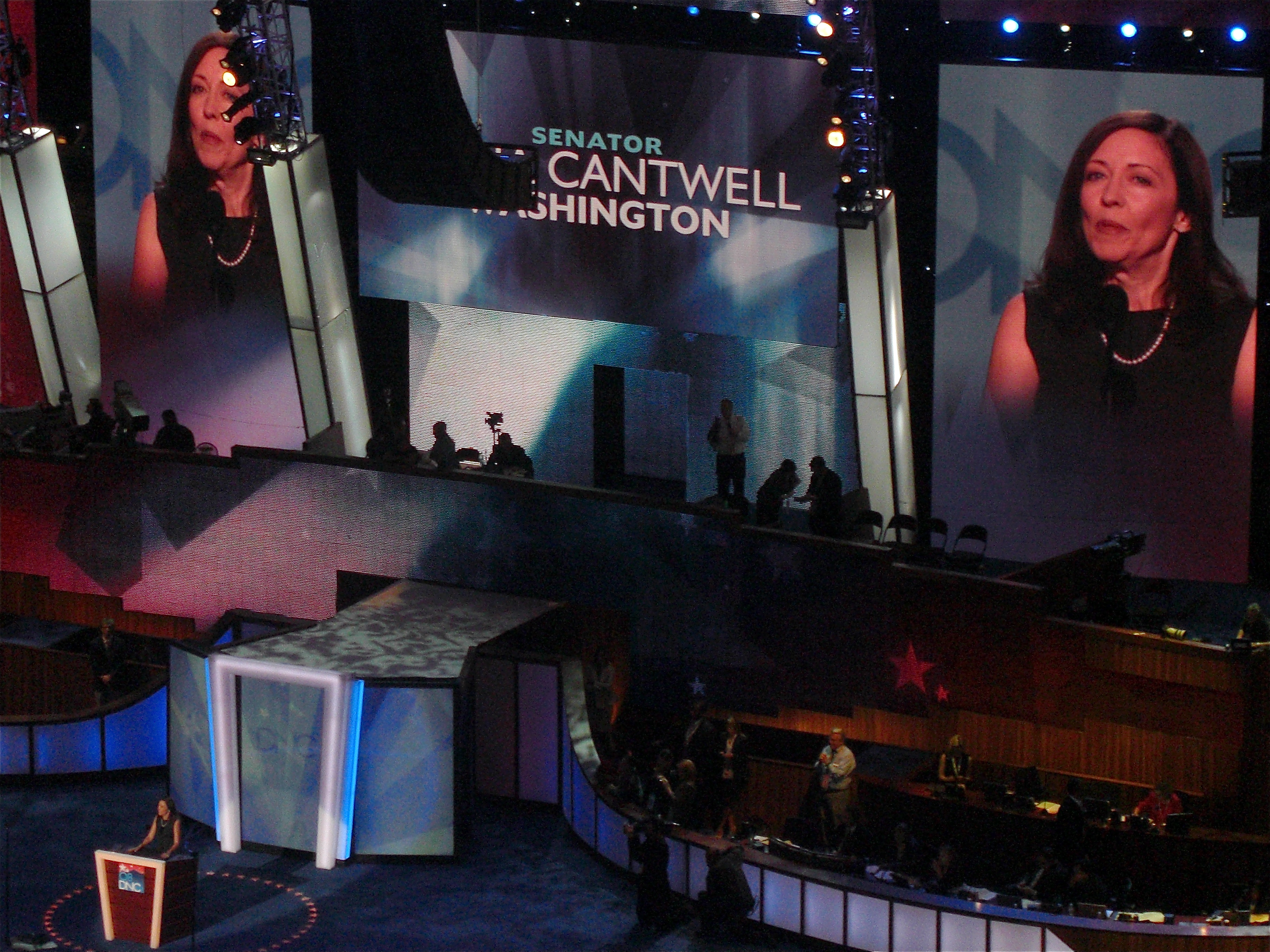
Cantwell speaks during the second day of the 2008 Democratic National Convention in Denver, Colorado.

On December 31, 2007, Cantwell became the 10th senator to endorse Hillary Clinton for President of the United States. She supported Clinton throughout the primaries, but vowed to vote for the winner of the pledged delegates. After Clinton conceded on June 7, Cantwell endorsed Obama. At the Washington State Democratic Convention on June 15, she said: "I do want to see a strong Democratic woman in the White House ... That's why I'm so glad Michelle Obama will be the next first lady."

On October 20, 2013, Cantwell was one of 16 female Democratic senators to sign a letter endorsing Hillary Clinton as the Democratic nominee in the 2016 presidential election.

=== Committee assignments ===
Cantwell's committee assignments for the 118th Congress are as follows:

- Committee on Commerce, Science and Transportation (Chair)
  - As chair, Cantwell is an ex officio member of all subcommittees.
- Committee on Energy and Natural Resources
- Committee on Finance
  - Subcommittee on Energy, Natural Resources, and Infrastructure
  - Subcommittee on Health Care
  - Subcommittee on Taxation and IRS Oversight
- Committee on Indian Affairs
- Committee on Small Business and Entrepreneurship
- Joint Committee on Taxation

=== Caucus memberships ===
- Congressional Caucus for Women's Issues
- Congressional Hazards Caucus
- Congressional Internet Caucus
- Congressional Wine Caucus
- Senate National Guard Caucus
- Senate New Democrat Coalition
- Senate Steel Caucus
- Rare Disease Caucus

== Personal life ==
In 2006, it emerged that court files concerning a loan Cantwell made in 2001 to her former boyfriend, boss, and campaign manager, lobbyist Ron Dotzauer, to help him through his divorce litigation, had been sealed. A Sound Politics reporter had the file unsealed and discovered that Cantwell was identified in the divorce records "as the 'other woman'".

Cantwell was also formerly in a relationship with Seattle-based track and cross country star Scott Daggatt, then serving as a stockbroker of a Seattle-based National Securities Corporation.

Owing to a sharp decrease in the value of her RealNetworks stock, Cantwell's personal fortune had declined significantly by 2011.

== Electoral history ==
1986 Washington's 44th state house district results
Party	Candidate	Votes	%
Democratic	Maria Cantwell	14,936	54.24%
Republican	George Dahlquist	12,600	45.76%
Total votes		27,536	100%
Democratic gain from Republican			

1988 Washington's 44th state house district results
Party	Candidate	Votes	%
Democratic	Maria Cantwell (incumbent)	28,381	65.56%
Republican	Robert Grupe	14,908	34.44%
Total votes		43,289	100%
Democratic hold			

1990 Washington's 44th state house district results
Party	Candidate	Votes	%
Democratic	Maria Cantwell (incumbent)	18,745	61.13%
Republican	Joyce Meyerson	11,917	38.87%
Total votes		30,662	100%
Democratic hold			

1992 Washington's 1st congressional district results
Party	Candidate	Votes	%
Democratic	Maria Cantwell	148,844	54.87%
Republican	Gary Nelson	113,897	41.99%
Independent	Patrick Ruckert	4,322	1.59%
Natural Law	Anne Fleming	4,211	1.55%
Total votes		271,274	100%
Democratic gain from Republican			

1994 Washington's 1st congressional district results
Party	Candidate	Votes	%
Republican	Rick White	100,554	51.66%
Democratic	Maria Cantwell (incumbent)	94,110	48.34%
Total votes		194,664	100%
Republican gain from Democratic			

2000 Washington US Senate general election results
Party	Candidate	Votes	%	±%
Democratic	Maria Cantwell	1,199,437	48.73%	+4.48%
Republican	Slade Gorton (incumbent)	1,197,208	48.64%	−7.11%
Libertarian	Jeff Jared	64,734	2.63%	+2.6%
Plurality		2,229	0.09%	
Turnout		2,461,379	100%	+761,206
Democratic gain from Republican				

2006 Washington US Senate Democratic primary results
Party	Candidate	Votes	%
Democratic	Maria Cantwell (Incumbent)	570,677	90.76%
Democratic	Hong Tran	33,124	5.27%
Democratic	Mike The Mover	11,274	1.79%
Democratic	Michael Goodspaceguy Nelson	9,454	1.50%
Democratic	Mohammad H. Said	4,222	0.67%
Total votes		628,751	100.00%

2006 Washington US Senate general election results
Party	Candidate	Votes	%	±%
Democratic	Maria Cantwell (incumbent)	1,184,659	56.85%	+8.12
Republican	Mike McGavick	832,106	39.93%	−8.71
Libertarian	Bruce Guthrie	29,331	1.41%	−1.22
Green	Aaron Dixon	21,254	1.02%	N/A
Independent	Robin Adair	16,384	0.79%	N/A
Total votes		2,083,734	100.00%	N/A
Democratic hold				

2012 Washington US Senate blanket primary results
Party	Candidate	Votes	%
Democratic	Maria Cantwell (incumbent)	626,360	55.42
Republican	Michael Baumgartner	344,729	30.50
Republican	Art Coday	59,255	5.24
Democratic	Timothy Wilson	26,850	2.38
Republican	Chuck Jackson	21,870	1.94
Republican	Glenn R. Stockwell	21,731	1.92
Republican	Mike The Mover	16,459	1.46
Reform	Will Baker	12,865	1.14
Total votes		1,130,119	100.00

2012 Washington US Senate general election results
Party	Candidate	Votes	%	±%
Democratic	Maria Cantwell (incumbent)	1,855,493	60.45%	+3.60%
Republican	Michael Baumgartner	1,213,924	39.55%	−0.38%
Total votes		3,069,417	100.00%	N/A
Democratic hold				

2018 Washington US Senate blanket primary results
Party	Candidate	Votes	%
Democratic	Maria Cantwell (incumbent)	929,961	54.68%
Republican	Susan Hutchison	413,317	24.30%
Republican	Keith Swank	39,818	2.34%
Republican	Joey Gibson	38,676	2.27%
Democratic	Clint Tannehill	35,770	2.10%
Republican	Dave Bryant	33,962	2.00%
Republican	Art Coday	30,654	1.80%
Independent	Jennifer Gigi Ferguson	25,224	1.48%
Republican	Tim Owen	23,167	1.36%
Republican	Matt Hawkins	13,324	0.78%
Democratic	Don L. Rivers	12,634	0.74%
Libertarian	Mike Luke	12,302	0.72%
Republican	Glen R. Stockwell	11,611	0.68%
Independent	Thor Amundson	9,393	0.55%
Democratic	Mohammad Said	8,649	0.51%
Republican	Matthew D. Heines	7,737	0.45%
Freedom Socialist	Steve Hoffman	7,390	0.43%
Republican	Michael Goodspaceguy Nelson	7,057	0.41%
Republican	John Orlinski	6,905	0.41%
Independent	Dave Strider	6,821	0.40%
Republican	Roque "Rocky" De La Fuente	5,724	0.34%
Green	James Robert "Jimmie" Deal	3,849	0.23%
The Human Rights Party	Sam Wright	3,761	0.22%
FDFR Party	Brad Chase	2,655	0.16%
Democratic	George H. Kalberer	2,448	0.14%
Independent	Charlie R. Jackson	2,411	0.14%
Republican	R. C. Smith	2,238	0.13%
Independent	Jon Butler	2,016	0.12%
StandUpAmerica	Alex Tsimerman	1,366	0.08%
Total votes		1,700,840	100.00%

2018 Washington US Senate general election results
Party	Candidate	Votes	%	±%
Democratic	Maria Cantwell (incumbent)	1,803,364	58.43%	−2.02%
Republican	Susan Hutchison	1,282,804	41.57%	+2.02%
Total votes		3,086,168	100.00%	N/A
Democratic hold				

2024 Washington US Senate blanket primary results
Party	Candidate	Votes	%
Democratic	Maria Cantwell (incumbent)	1,114,327	57.18%
Republican	Raul Garcia	431,182	22.13%
Republican	Scott Nazarino	111,386	5.72%
Republican	Isaak Holyk	110,701	5.68%
Republican	Mel Ram	86,956	4.46%
Independent	Chuck Jackson	21,055	1.08%
Independent	David Tilton	17,561	0.90%
Democratic	Paul Giesick	17,433	0.89%
Republican	Goodspaceguy	16,826	0.86%
Independent	Thor Amundson	10,587	0.54%
Socialist Workers	Henry Dennison	7,840	0.40%
Write-in		2,862	0.15%
Total votes		1,948,716	100%

2024 Washington US Senate general election results
Party	Candidate	Votes	%	±%
Democratic	Maria Cantwell (incumbent)	2,252,577	59.09%	+0.66%
Republican	Raul Garcia	1,549,187	40.64%	−0.93%
Write-in		10,627	0.28%	N/A
Total votes		3,812,391	100.00%	N/A
Democratic hold				

== See also ==
- Women in the United States House of Representatives
- Women in the United States Senate

== Notes ==
U.S. House of Representatives
Preceded by John Miller	Member of the U.S. House of Representatives from Washington's 1st congressional district 1993–1995	Succeeded by Rick White
Party political offices
Preceded by Ron Sims	Democratic nominee for U.S. Senator from Washington (Class 1); 2000, 2006, 2012, 2018, 2024	Most recent
U.S. Senate
Preceded by Slade Gorton	U.S. Senator (Class 1) from Washington; 2001–present Served alongside: Patty Murray	Incumbent
Preceded by Daniel Akaka	Chair of the Senate Indian Affairs Committee; 2013–2014	Succeeded by Jon Tester
Preceded by Mary Landrieu	Chair of the Senate Small Business Committee; 2014–2015	Succeeded by David Vitter
Preceded by Lisa Murkowski	Ranking Member of the Senate Energy Committee; 2015–2019	Succeeded by Joe Manchin
Preceded by Bill Nelson	Ranking Member of the Senate Commerce Committee; 2019–2021	Succeeded by Roger Wicker
Preceded by Roger Wicker	Chair of the Senate Commerce Committee; 2021–2025	Succeeded by Ted Cruz
Preceded by Ted Cruz	Ranking Member of the Senate Commerce Committee; 2025–present	Incumbent
U.S. order of precedence (ceremonial)
Preceded by Mike Crapo	Order of precedence of the United States as United States Senator	Succeeded by John Cornyn
Preceded by Mike Crapo	United States senators by seniority 10th	Succeeded by John Cornyn
