= Chris Marr =

American politician from Washington

Member of the Washington Senate from the 6th district
- In office January 8, 2007 – January 10, 2011
- Preceded by: Brad Benson
- Succeeded by: Michael Baumgartner

Personal details
- Born: August 20, 1954 (age 71) New Jersey, U.S.
- Party: Democratic
- Spouse: Christine Marr
- Children: 2
- Occupation: Politician

Christopher J. Marr (born August 20, 1954) is a former state senator from Spokane, Washington, representing Washington's 6th Legislative District in the Washington State Legislature in Olympia. He was defeated in the November 2010 general election by Michael Baumgartner, after one term in office. The election battle between Marr and Baumgartner was considered the most expensive legislative race in Washington State history. Marr's term effectively ended in January, 2011.

Marr was elected to a four-year term in November 2006, and was the first Democrat elected to the State Senate from the 6th District since 1940.

== Career ==
Following management positions at Ford Motor Company and McDonald's Corporation, Marr spent twenty years as managing partner of the Foothills Auto Group, which operates automotive dealerships in the Spokane area, before his election to the Washington State Senate in 2006. Marr also served on the Board of Regents of Washington State University and the Board of Governors of the W.S.U. Foundation. He formerly chaired the board of Empire Health Services and Inland Northwest Health Services as well as the Spokane Regional Chamber of Commerce and the Washington State Transportation Commission.

== Personal ==
Marr has been married for 30 years to his wife, Christine, and they have two grown children.

== Spokane Lincoln-Mercury litigation ==
In January 2006, Dawn Fowler settled with her former employer, Spokane Lincoln-Mercury, for an undisclosed amount. Fowler alleged that management at Spokane-Lincoln Mercury ignored her complaints of sexual harassment for years. Fowler was employed by Spokane Lincoln-Mercury from 1997, to April 2005. During the time of the alleged incidents of harassment, Chris Marr was part owner and vice-president and then later, president, of Spokane Lincoln-Mercury. In an October 26, 2008, in an article published by The Spokesman-Review, Marr categorically denied the allegation that upper management ignored Dawn Fowler’s complaints, and questioned the timing of the story. In the same article, Marr said that a, “toxic relationship”, between Fowler and one of the defendant’s families may have partially instigated the lawsuit. Most of Fowler’s allegations identified a specific employee as the primary offender. Marr stated that he and fellow owner Ray Kish reached a decision to settle because this employee was suffering from cancer and they wished to spare him from the burden of depositions and arbitration.

== Senate term 2007-2010 ==
Marr was vice chair of the Senate Transportation Committee and was also the democratic assistant floor leader. He also sat on the Health & Long-Term Care Committee and the Human Services & Corrections Committee.

== Awards and honors ==
Marr is a recipient of the 2008 Fuse "Sizzle" Award for, "outstanding leadership on bills that will reduce Washington’s global warming pollution." The award honors his leadership in general and his sponsorship of the Local Solutions to Global Warming bill in particular.

== Criticism ==
In 2009, Marr became the recipient of a Fuse "Fizzle" Award, for voting against environmental reform and critical protections.
