= Rick White (politician) =

American politician (born 1953)

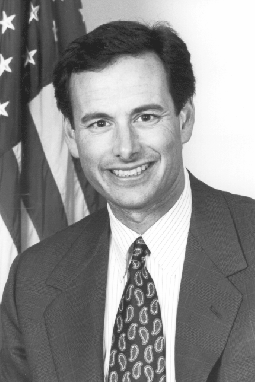

Member of the U.S. House of Representatives from Washington's 1st district
- In office January 3, 1995 – January 3, 1999
- Preceded by: Maria Cantwell
- Succeeded by: Jay Inslee

Personal details
- Born: Richard Alan White; November 6, 1953 (age 72) Bloomington, Indiana, U.S.
- Party: Republican
- Spouse: Vicki (m. 1982–1998)
- Children: 5
- Education: Dartmouth College (BA); Georgetown University (JD)

Richard Alan White (born November 6, 1953) is an American lawyer and former politician who served as a member of the United States House of Representatives, representing Washington's 1st congressional district from 1995 to 1999. He is a member of the Republican Party.

== Early life, education, and private sector career ==
White was born and raised primarily in Bloomington, Indiana, but due to his father's job with Marathon Oil, lived in Geneva, Switzerland, and Indianapolis, Indiana, for short periods and graduated from North Central High School in Indianapolis. He attended Dartmouth College and studied abroad at the University of Paris.

White received his J.D. degree from Georgetown University in 1980. He was first hired as a law clerk to Judge Charles Clark and later became an attorney. In 1986, he became involved with politics for the first time, earning a term on the Queen Anne (Seattle) community council.

White worked at the law firm of Perkins Coie for 11 years prior to being elected to Congress in 1994.

White is the founder and former director of Books for kids, a literacy program. He participated in the YMCA's Indian Guides program and was a law explorers advisor to the Boy Scouts of America. He is a member of Leadership Tomorrow, a non-profit organization. He is the former leader of the Republican Party Farm Team, which encourages young professionals to get involved with the GOP.

== Political career ==
White first won election to the House in 1994 against Democrat Maria Cantwell. White served on the Committee on Energy and Commerce. While in Congress, he was active on issues related to the Internet and technology. He founded the Congressional Internet Caucus and he helped develop the Telecommunications Act of 1996.

He won re-election for a second term in 1996, but was defeated by Democrat Jay Inslee in 1998. Running on an anti-abortion platform, spoiler Bruce Craswell's third party candidacy cut into the traditional Republican base. White had exceeded 50% of the vote in 1994 and 1996, but the Craswell factor left him with less than 45% in 1998.

== After Congress ==
He rejoined the Perkins Coie law firm in 1999. White let his law license lapse while he wasn't practicing law, and his license was suspended by the Washington Supreme Court in 2003 for failure to pay bar dues. He was reinstated to the bar in 2005 after paying a small fee.

From 2001 to 2005, White was president and CEO of TechNet, a bipartisan group that lobbies on behalf of technology companies. He co-founded and was CEO of IP Street, Inc. He is principal of the Woodbay Group.

== See also ==
- Politics of the United States

U.S. House of Representatives
Preceded by Maria Cantwell	Member of the U.S. House of Representatives from Washington's 1st congressional district 1995–1999	Succeeded by Jay Inslee
U.S. order of precedence (ceremonial)
Preceded by Linda Smith as Former U.S. Representative	Order of precedence of the United States as Former U.S. Representative	Succeeded by Larry LaRocco as Former U.S. Representative
