= Susan Hutchison =

American journalist (born 1954)

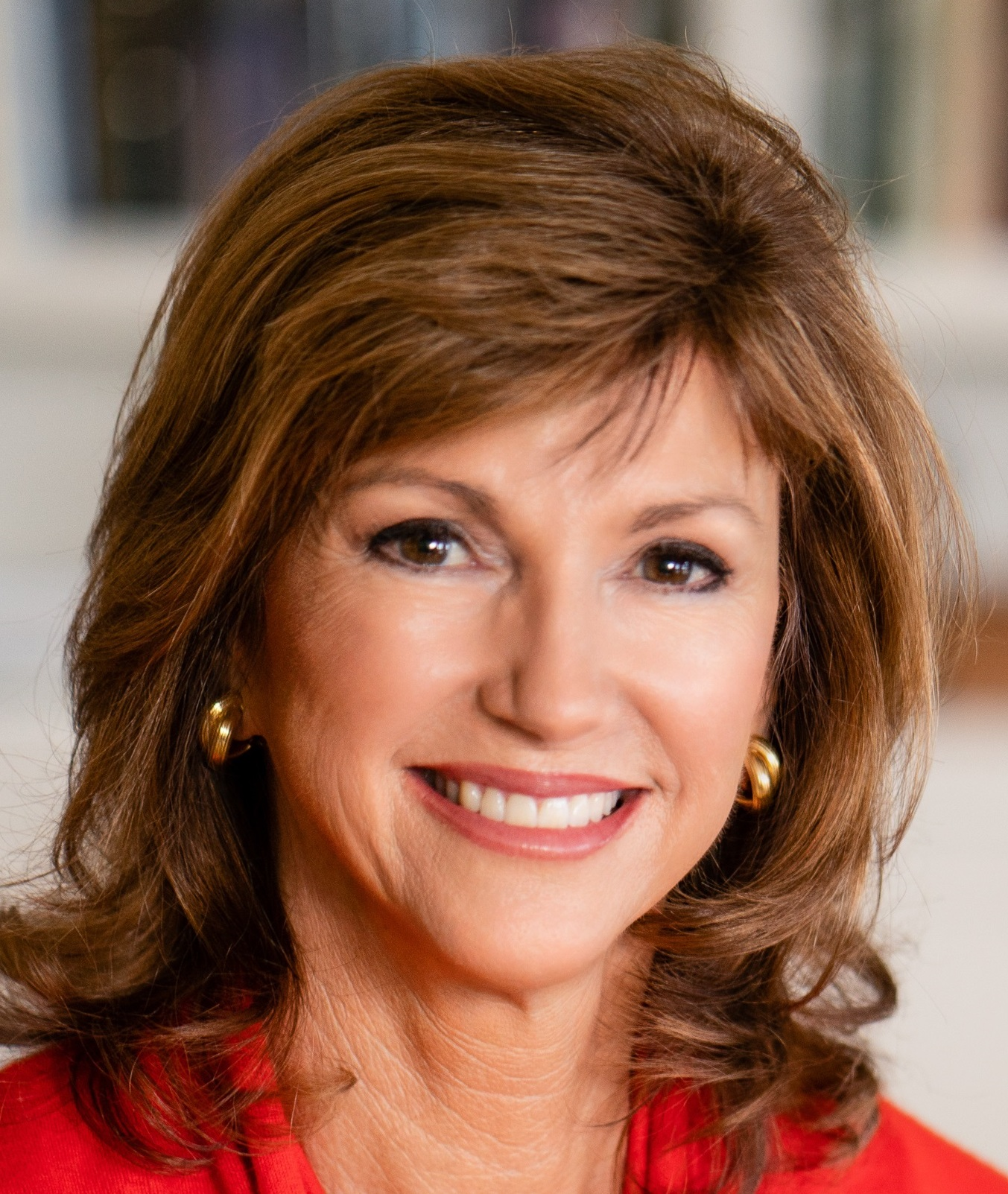

Chair of the Washington Republican Party
- In office August 24, 2013 – February 5, 2018
- Preceded by: Luanne Van Werven (acting)
- Succeeded by: Caleb Heimlich

Personal details
- Born: Susan Sylvester; March 24, 1954 (age 72) Fairfield, California, U.S.
- Party: Republican
- Spouse: Andy Hutchison (m. 1976)
- Children: 2
- Education: University of Florida (BA)
- Website: Campaign website (archived Nov. 06 2018)

Susan Hutchison (née Sylvester; born March 24, 1954) is an American television news journalist, educator, and politician. She served as chair of the Washington State Republican Party from 2013 to 2018 and was a candidate for the United States Senate in 2018.

Hutchison served as executive director of the Charles and Lisa Simonyi Fund for the Arts and Sciences, chair of the Seattle Symphony, and served on the boards of the Seattle Art Museum, Seattle Children's Hospital, the Smithsonian National Air and Space Museum, and Young Life.

Hutchison is a professor for Seattle Pacific University's MBA program, instructing graduate students in managerial communications. As a communications consultant and executive coach, she trained more than 100 executives in companies in Seattle, Redmond, and Palo Alto to effectively communicate to audiences.

Hutchison spent most of her 25-year journalism career as a news anchor at KIRO-TV news in Seattle, a CBS affiliate, where she received five regional Emmy Awards for writing and producing.

Hutchison's husband, Andy, an executive with the Boeing Company served as a retired colonel in the United States Marine Corps Reserve.

== Early life and education ==
Hutchison was born Susan Sylvester at Travis Air Force Base in Fairfield, California, the daughter of Elaine (née Winderling) and George Sylvester. Her father was a pilot in the U.S. Air Force. A 1949 West Point graduate, he flew transports, then became a fighter pilot in the mid-1960s and commanded an F-4 squadron in South Vietnam at Da Nang. As a military daughter and the second of three children, she was raised in various locations and attended Niceville High School in the panhandle of Florida and transferred in 1970 to Annandale High School in Annandale, Virginia, a suburb southwest of Washington, D.C. After graduation in 1972, she enrolled at the University of Florida in Gainesville and earned a bachelor's degree in journalism, graduating early in 1975.

== Journalism ==
Upon graduation in 1975, she was hired by an affiliate of the American Broadcasting Company (ABC). In 1978, she was hired as the weekend sports anchor and producer for KITV news in Honolulu, Hawaii. She became the weekend news anchor, and then the weekday evening news anchor and producer. After being spotted by a Seattle television executive, Hutchison was hired in January 1981 as a TV news anchor for the CBS affiliate in Seattle, KIRO-TV. She worked as the evening anchor for more than 20 years, earning five Emmy Awards.

== Philanthropy ==
In 2003, Hutchison was hired as the executive director of the Charles and Lisa Simonyi Fund for Arts and Sciences. The foundation provided $100 million in grants for projects in arts, science, and education.

Hutchison has served as trustee of the following boards: Finance Chair, Woodrow Wilson International Center for Scholars appointed by George W. Bush, chair, Young Life International, Vice Chair, All-Star Orchestra (current), Vice President (present) and chair, Seattle Symphony, and has served on the following boards: Smithsonian Institution National Air and Space Museum, Seattle Art Museum, Seattle Children's Hospital Foundation, Discovery Institute, and Salvation Army. She also has been a spokesperson for the American Leprosy Mission, Northwest Medical Teams, Job Corps, and March of Dimes, and has emceed charitable auctions, fundraising events and dinners.

Her civic involvement includes the Governor's A+ Commission on Education, National Collegiate Athletic Association Committee on Compliance, the King County Independent Task Force on Elections, and the Chancellor's Advisory Council for Seattle Community Colleges. She received the Washington Policy Center's Champion of Freedom award and the Seattle Mayor's Good Neighbor award. The Washington State Republican Party named her Chair Emeritus, the only such designation in its history.

== Political career ==
In 2005, Hutchison was one of ten people appointed by King County Executive Ron Sims to the “King County Independent Task Force on Elections” that was commissioned to make recommendations to improve the election process after the contested gubernatorial election of 2004.

When Sims stepped down in April 2009, Hutchison announced her candidacy for the non-partisan office of King County executive. Hutchison won the primary election with 37% of the vote and finished second in the general election against Dow Constantine, with 224,467 votes (41% of the vote).

In 2013, Hutchison became the chair of the Washington State Republican Party. As chair of the party, she described Republicans as a “patchwork quilt of opinions” in need of unity and strong leadership. During her term as chair, the GOP gained six seats in the state house of representatives and the number of state senators caucusing with the Republicans expanded to 26, the highest total since 1949. She resigned in February 2018 amid speculation she would take a position with the administration of President Donald Trump. Hutchison was the unsuccessful Republican nominee for the U.S. Senate in the 2018 election, losing to incumbent Democrat Maria Cantwell. Hutchison received 1,282,804 votes (42% of the vote). During the campaign, she debated Cantwell twice, and emphasized “18 reasons” to vote for Hutchison in 2018.

== Personal life ==
In 1976, she married high school classmate Andy Hutchison, who became an executive with the Boeing Company. He is a retired Marine Corps colonel and a 1976 graduate of the U.S. Naval Academy. They have two sons who graduated from Seattle public schools. Her father, George H. Sylvester (1927–2015), retired from the U.S. Air Force in 1981 as a lieutenant general.

Party political offices
Preceded by Kirby Wilbur	Chair of the Washington Republican Party; 2013–2018	Succeeded by Caleb Heimlich
Preceded by Michael Baumgartner	Republican nominee for U.S. Senator from Washington (Class 1); 2018	Succeeded by Raul Garcia
