= Susan Paynter =

American journalist

Susan Paynter (born August 29, 1945) is an American journalist and writer based in the Northwest who has covered and commented on social issues since the late 1960s. A reporter, columnist and critic for the Seattle Post-Intelligencer from 1968 to 2007, she wrote ground-breaking, often controversial pieces on civil rights; equal rights for women, gays and lesbians; prison reform; juvenile justice; abortion and contraception; police; racial divisions; courts, and politics.

== Early life and career ==
Paynter was born in Portland, Oregon, to G. Allan Oakes and Vera Oakes. She grew up in Bremerton, Washington, graduated from West High School, attended Olympic College in Bremerton and got her first newspaper job at age 19 at the Bremerton Sun.

== Seattle Post-Intelligencer ==
Paynter wrote the first newspaper series in Washington state (12 parts, reprinted in tabloid format) on the struggle to pass state and federal equal rights amendments. (An interview with her on this topic, conducted by the Washington Women's History Project, appears online.) Two years before the U.S. Supreme Court ruling on Roe v. Wade she wrote two multipart series on the campaign for the passage of abortion reform in Washington state. Paynter covered and commented on topics including equal pay, domestic violence, reforms in the reporting and prosecution of rape, societal attitudes toward working mothers, and the role of religion in American public life. Between 1975 and 1991, she covered local and national television, including network and cable news, entertainment programming, trends and TV personalities. From 1991 until her early retirement in 2007, she wrote a three-times-a-week news and opinion column for the P-I, including breaking news and interviews with newsmakers. In one column, based on an interview with progressive Seattle Police Chief Norm Stamper, the chief revealed his past as a racist, homophobic and excessively forceful rookie cop. The revelations caused members of the force to demand (but not get) his resignation. Other columns pressed for FDA approval and unfettered availability of emergency contraception, and for marriage equality for gays and lesbians, making her a target of conservative commentators, including Rush Limbaugh, Bill O'Reilly and Tom Leykis.

== Radio ==
During the five years preceding her retirement, she appeared each Friday on Seattle's National Public Radio station KUOW/FM on a panel commenting on the week's news.

== Awards ==
Paynter has received several national and state journalism awards, including from the Catherine O'Brien Foundation for reporting on family issues, the Michael E. DeBakey Foundation for Biomedical Research, Washington Press Women, Washington Women in Communications and the Society of Professional Journalists. She also received a Power of Choice lifetime achievement award from the Washington state affiliate of NARAL Pro-Choice America, presented by Sarah Weddington, the attorney who argued Roe v. Wade before the U.S. Supreme Court. She was a finalist for the Ernie Pyle Award for human interest writing and for a Nieman Fellowship at Harvard University.

== Personal life ==
Paynter was married to John Engstrom, former P-I sports reporter and columnist, travel editor, feature writer, TV critic and reporter, and lifestyle editor, until his death in January 2014. She lives on the Oregon Coast and has a grown son, Nate Engstrom (b. 1989).

== Book ==
In late 2012, Paynter completed the manuscript for her first (yet-to-be-published) book, tentatively titled: "Inkling: High Times in the Bottoming Newspaper Business."
