= Mike McGavick =

American business executive

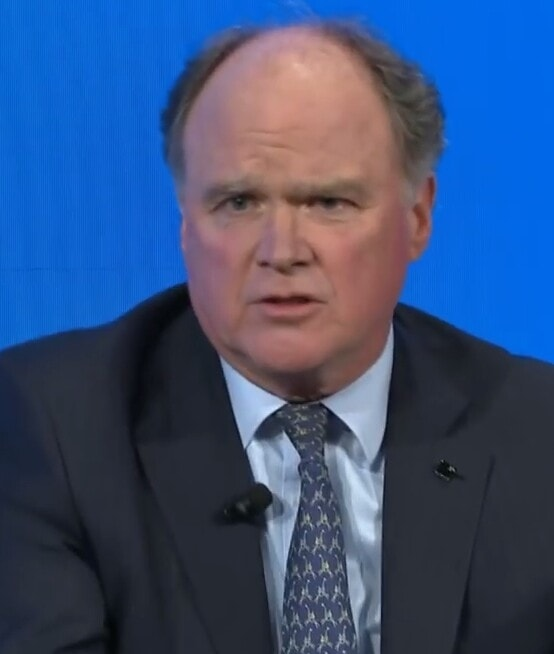
- McGavick in 2018

Personal details
- Born: Michael Sean McGavick; February 7, 1958 (age 68) Seattle, Washington, U.S.
- Party: Republican
- Spouse: Gaelynn
- Children: 3
- Education: University of Washington (BA)
- Occupation: Corporate officer

Michael Sean McGavick (born February 7, 1958) is an American business executive and a graduate of the University of Washington.

McGavick was the Republican nominee for the US Senate seat held by Maria Cantwell in the 2006 election, but Cantwell retained her seat. In March 2008, global insurance company XL Group plc – formerly XL Capital Ltd prior to officially changing its name and domicile in 2010 – announced that McGavick would take over as CEO beginning on May 1, 2008. With 4,000 employees, XL Group headquartered in Bermuda and Stamford, Connecticut, and about 60 offices in more than 20 countries.

== Career ==
McGavick was the CEO of Ireland-based XL Group plc, and former chairman/president/CEO of the insurance company Safeco. McGavick has been recognized as the Bermuda Insurance Institute's (Re)insurance Person of the Year, the Review Magazine's Industry Personality of the Year and Reactions Magazine's Insurance CEO of the Year. He is currently the Chairman of the Association of Bermuda Insurers & Reinsurers, The Geneva Association, and of the Global Reinsurance Forum.

He served as chief of staff to U.S. Senator Slade Gorton and manager of Gorton's campaign in 1988. He later served as director of the American Insurance Association's Superfund Improvement Project in Washington, D.C., where he was the American Insurance Association's lead negotiator in working to transform the nation's Superfund environmental laws. He was also a staff member of the Seattle-based Washington Roundtable, a non-partisan policy research group composed of the chief executive officers of the state's largest corporations.

McGavick was senior financial officer for Continental Casualty Company (CNA)'s Commercial Lines Group, vice president of CNA's New Ventures group, and president and chief operating officer of CNA's largest operating department. The department, with $3.5 billion in annual revenues, provided the majority of CNA's commercial insurance products. It also was responsible for managing CNA's relationship with its independent agent distribution system.

=== Safeco ===
McGavick was named "CEO of the Year" by the Puget Sound Business Journal in 2002. On July 18, 2005, McGavick announced that effective August 31 he would step down as CEO of Safeco, but would remain on as chairman until the end of 2005. McGavick explained that he expected "to give full consideration to the possibility of public service". On July 19, 2005, McGavick announced that he was forming an exploratory committee for a 2006 bid for the Washington United States Senate seat held by Maria Cantwell.

== Personal life ==
Born in 1958, McGavick grew up in Seattle's Wallingford neighborhood with two sisters, Molly and Meaghan. His parents, Joe and Carole, were active in local civics. He attended Seattle Preparatory School, a college prep school and graduated from the University of Washington with a degree in political science. He was also a key member of the Rugby team there. His father, Joe, served both in the State Legislature and on the State Liquor Control Board. Joe McGavick was the last Republican to serve the Wallingford neighborhood since the Great Depression. McGavick has credited his father for sparking his interest in politics.

McGavick's wife, Gaelynn, is an attorney by training who has experience in the arena of health care policy, at one point working as a liaison to the White House for the American Hospital Association. The McGavicks have two sons.

== Senate campaign ==
=== McGavick makes "civility" a central campaign theme ===
In early January 2006, McGavick began his campaign full-time for the U.S. Senate, saying he would bring a "Northwestern voice of civility" to what he described as a culture of infighting in the nation's capital.

For most of July, the McGavick campaign traveled around the state in an RV, making stops in: Seattle, Sedro-Woolley, Oak Harbor, Anacortes, Bellingham, Friday Harbor, Port Angeles, Forks, Clallam Bay, Bremerton, Belfair, Satsop, Aberdeen, Raymond, South Bend, Seaview, Naselle, Cathlamet, Vancouver, Goldendale, Pateros, Brewster, Republic, Colville, Spokane, Pullman, Clarkston, Pomeroy, Dayton, Prosser, Ritzville, Moses Lake, Leavenworth, and Yakima, among others.

==== Schwartzman v. McGavick ====
In August 2006, Safeco Insurance Co. shareholder Emma Schwartzman, the great, great-granddaughter of one of the Safeco Corporation founders, filed a lawsuit against him and the Safeco corporation, claiming that his $28 million salary upon leaving his job was fraudulent and wasteful.

Knoll Lowney, a Seattle lawyer, represented Schwartzman.

=== Supported teaching intelligent design ===
In an August 2006 interview, McGavick said intelligent design should be taught in public schools and that it is appropriate to be taught in science class despite the 2005 court ruling prohibiting it.

=== Timeline of 2006 Senate race ===
On October 26, 2005, McGavick announced on KIRO Radio that he was an official candidate in the 2006 Senate race.

In the May 2006 edition of the Weekly Standard, McGavick made the argument that Iran should be banned from the FIFA World Cup due to its nuclear weapons research program and statements by Iranian President Mahmoud Ahmadinejad that deny the truthfulness of the holocaust (which is a criminal offense in the 2006 World Cup host country, Germany).

On April 26, 2006, the Washington State Democratic Party filed a complaint with the Federal Elections Commission alleging that the $17 million severance in cash and accelerated stock options given to him by Safeco amounted to an illegal campaign contribution to his Senate campaign. The FEC dismissed the case, stating, "The commission concluded that these payments were ordinary employment-related compensation made irrespective of Mr. McGavick's candidacy."

Party political offices
Preceded by Slade Gorton	Republican nominee for United States Senator from Washington (Class 1); 2006	Succeeded by Michael Baumgartner
