= 2004 Washington gubernatorial election =

- November 2, 2004
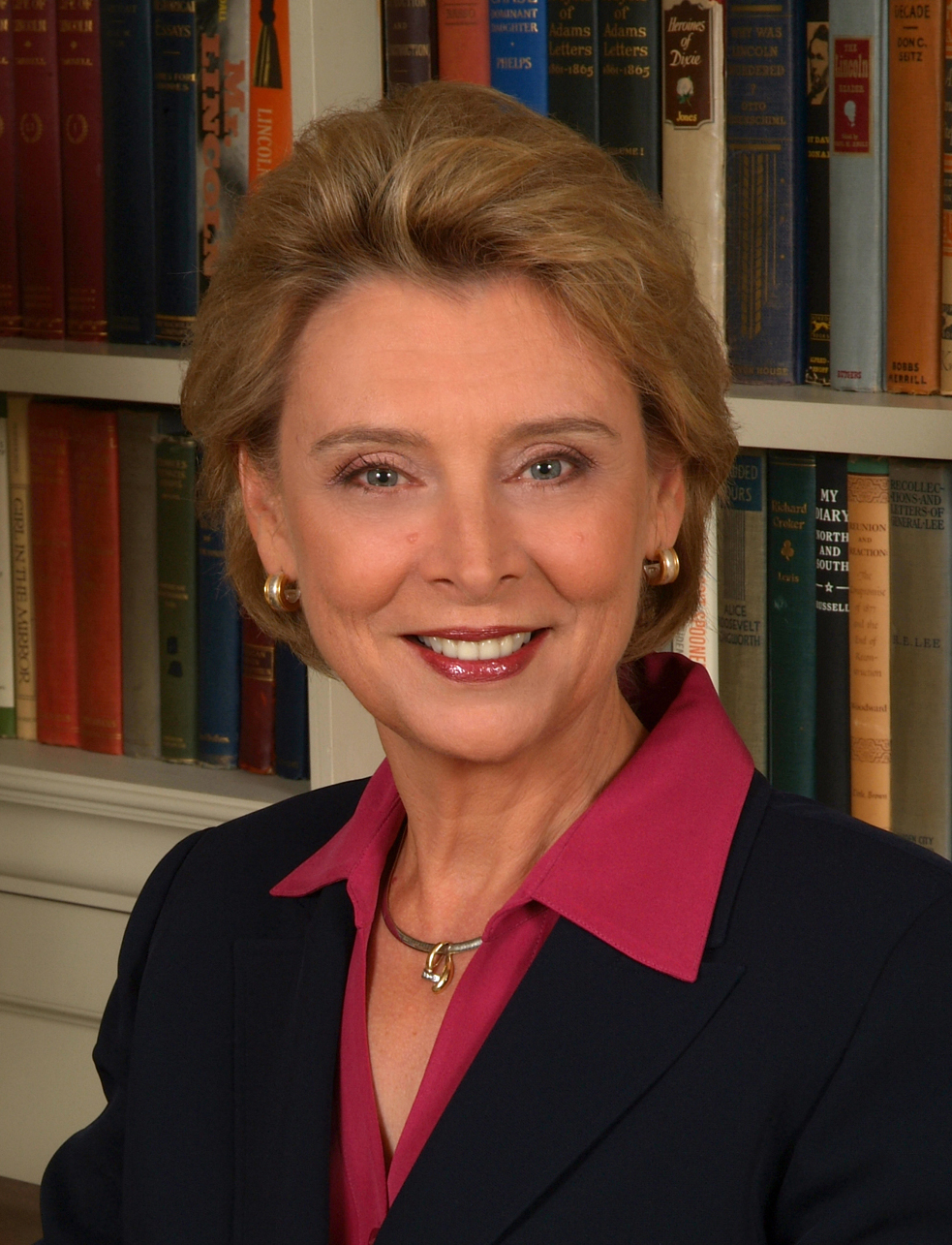

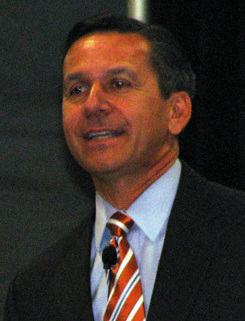
Nominee	Christine Gregoire	Dino Rossi
Party	Democratic	Republican
Popular vote	1,373,361	1,373,232
Percentage	48.873%	48.868%
- County results Gregoire: 40–50% 50–60% Rossi: 40–50% 50–60% 60–70%
Governor before election
Gary Locke
Democratic
Elected Governor
Christine Gregoire
Democratic

The 2004 Washington gubernatorial election was held on November 2, 2004. The race gained national attention for its legal twists and extremely close finish, among the closest political races in United States election history. Republican Dino Rossi was declared the winner of the initial count and again of the automated recount, but after a second recount done by hand, Democrat Christine Gregoire took the lead by a margin of 129 votes.

Although Gregoire was sworn in as governor of Washington on January 12, 2005, Rossi did not formally concede and called for a re-vote over concerns about the integrity of the election. The Republican Party filed a lawsuit in Chelan County Superior Court contesting the election, but the trial judge ruled against it, citing lack of evidence of deliberate electoral sabotage. Rossi chose not to appeal to the Washington State Supreme Court, formally conceding the election on June 6, 2005. Gregoire was re-elected in 2008 in a rematch with Rossi.

== Primary elections ==
The 2004 election cycle was the first in Washington to use a party-line ballot system of holding primary elections. The state had a long tradition of using blanket primaries, where the candidates of all political parties appear together on the same ballot for all voters. In this system, the leading vote-getter from each party advances to the general election. Washington's voters are not registered by party affiliation and a voter could participate in selecting candidates for more than one party, although the voter could only choose one candidate (of whatever party) for each office.

In February 2004 the United States Supreme Court declined to review a lower court decision striking down the blanket primary as unconstitutional, based on it violating the rights of the parties to freedom of association under the First Amendment. Washington was thus forced to devise a new primary election system. The state legislature passed a bill providing that the top two vote-getters for each office in the primary would advance to the general election, regardless of which political party they belonged to. Voters would still be allowed to vote for any candidate as before. However, this measure was vetoed by Governor Gary Locke in favor of a Montana-style system that requires voters to choose a ballot for one specific party and vote only on that party's candidates in the primary.

The primary election in 2004 was held using the new system, but a campaign to replace it was already underway. The Washington State Grange, which had helped institute the blanket primary in 1935, filed Initiative 872 to implement the "top-two" primary instead, which would once again allow voters to cross party lines in the primary election but now send the top two vote-getters to the general election. In districts dominated by one party, the top-two system could result in Democrat- or Republican-only general election races. Supporters claimed it would bring back voter choice across party lines and allow independent voters to participate in the primary; opponents said it would exclude third parties and independent candidates from general election ballots, and would in fact reduce general election voter choice. The initiative was put to a public vote in November 2004, and passed with 60% of the vote. The state Republican, Democratic and Libertarian parties sued, however, and a federal district court judge ruled in 2005 that the measure was unconstitutional because it too infringed the parties' First Amendment right to select their own candidates. Washington continued with the party-line primary system while appealing the case.

=== Democratic primary ===
Results by county Gregoire: 50–60%; 60–70%; 70–80%; 80–90%

In July 2003, incumbent Governor Gary Locke indicated that he would not seek a third term, opening up the Democratic primary to alternate candidates. Former Washington State Supreme Court justice Phil Talmadge was the first candidate to enter the race for the Democratic primary, challenging Gary Locke before he announced his retirement, but Washington Attorney General Christine Gregoire quickly became the frontrunner, leading in fundraising and endorsements. King County Executive Ron Sims also announced his candidacy. According to a March 2004, Mellman Group poll, Gregoire would beat both Sims and Talmadge 36% to 11% and four percent in an open primary, and would beat Sims 55% to 17% in a closed primary. On April 29, 2004, Talmadge announced he was withdrawing from the race following the discovery of a benign kidney tumor, citing the likely need for surgery and associated recovery time.

Candidate	Home city	Total votes	Percentage
Christine Gregoire	Auburn	504,018	65.62%
Ron Sims	Seattle	228,306	29.72%
Mike The Mover	Lynnwood	15,118	1.96%
Don Hansler	Spanaway	8,636	1.12%
Scott Headland	Tacoma	6,983	0.90%
Eugen Buculei	Bellevue	5,005	0.65%

=== Republican primary ===
Results by county Rossi: 60–70%; 70–80%; 80–90%; 90–100%

The Washington State Republican Party struggled to find a candidate through most of 2003 when presumed candidate Bob Herbold, a former executive vice president and COO of Microsoft, declined to run. They finally recruited Dino Rossi, a relatively obscure political figure who left the state senate to pursue a gubernatorial run due to state elected officials being prohibited from raising money while the legislature is in session.

Candidate	Home city	Total votes	Percentage
Dino Rossi	Sammamish	444,337	85.14%
Bill Meyer	Bellingham	44,448	8.51%
John W. Aiken Jr.	Medical Lake	33,104	6.34%

=== Libertarian primary ===
The Libertarian Party of Washington State race was between Ruth Bennett, former state chair of the party in Washington and Colorado, and Michael Nelson.

Candidate	Home city	Total votes	Percentage
Ruth Bennett	Seattle	7,382	56.48%
Michael Nelson	Seattle	5,687	43.51%

== General election ==
=== Campaign ===
Both Gregoire and Rossi ran as centrists and promised to change the political landscape in Washington, and both made job and economic growth the centerpiece of their campaigns.

The Rossi campaign presented its own job growth plan, and stated that 20 years of Democratic governors were to blame for the economic troubles in the state. However, during the general election he was criticized for a strongly conservative voting record that was at odds with his moderate campaign posture. Rossi was also criticized for his long-time professional association with a real estate broker convicted of fraud, and for alleged résumé embellishments. Rossi had worked against Roe v. Wade, attacked opponents for supporting gay rights, and proclaimed that creationism should be taught in public schools. Rossi campaigned on being anti-abortion and in favor of state and federal Constitutional Amendments that would ban certain benefits for gay couples. He downplayed his long history of conservative comments and claimed to be a "fiscal moderate with a social conscience." Rossi would not publicly state his opinion over stem cell research.

The Gregoire campaign promised to boost job growth in the state which had slowed greatly after the dot-com bubble burst in 2000, to improve education, and to increase access to health care. It also focused on Gregoire's record of challenging big tobacco and pharmaceutical companies in her tenure as state attorney general. Gregoire also proposed a major state-led initiative in life sciences, especially stem cell research, where she proposed investing US$500 million of a tobacco settlement the state hoped to receive in 2008. Her economic plan for the state focused on improving state infrastructure and improving the quality of education in the state, which she claimed would attract investors. Gregoire also stated that she believed Washington residents should be allowed to buy prescription medicine from Canada, while Rossi said that he needed to be convinced it "was safe". Gregoire was criticized for being a part of the state government establishment, but tried to counter Rossi's "time for a change" message by saying that she would "blow past the bureaucracy" and bring change herself. This language surprised and disappointed many of her colleagues and supporters, who saw it as a failure to give mention or credit to the efforts and achievements of past Democratic governors.

Gregoire was also strongly criticized in many attack ads for an incident which occurred in 2000, when Gregoire's office failed to file documents on time to appeal a record $17.8 million personal-injury verdict against Washington. Documents from an independent investigation conducted at the time of the incident show that Gregoire's deputies attempted to influence who was listed as responsible for the missed deadline. A further case Gregoire was strongly criticized for occurred in 2002 during a wrongful death lawsuit when Gregoire's office did not detect an error in jury instructions. The state was forced to pay $22.4 million to the plaintiff. While Gregoire was not directly responsible for these offenses, the Rossi campaign claimed that she had already cost Washington taxpayers millions of dollars and was negligent.

Rossi won the endorsement of the Republican Party, the National Rifle Association of America, The Seattle Times, several business and medical associations, and former governor Dan Evans. Gregoire received the endorsement of the Democratic Party, GLAAD, the Seattle Post-Intelligencer, abortion rights organizations, and all the previous Democratic governors of the state. However, the Republican Party decided not to fund ads for Rossi in the state as polls leading up to the election date showed Gregoire with a clear lead. Almost all of Rossi's ads were paid for and created by outside sources, although as Gregoire's lead narrowed closer to the election date, the Republican Party ultimately decided to launch a series of advertisements for Rossi.

Ruth Bennett's campaign focused on permitting same-sex marriage in the state and economic liberalization in line with the political philosophy of libertarianism. She also recommended equally dividing the state budget among the counties and allowing the counties to establish tax systems on a county-by-county basis, ultimately leading to a diminished role of Washington's Department of Revenue.

Gregoire led in almost all polls conducted leading up to the election, but Rossi was able to close in on her late in the race and won considerable support from Eastern Washington. He also ran much stronger than expected in Snohomish and Pierce Counties. Gregoire received strong support (nearly a three-to-two margin) from the largest county in the state, King County, which includes heavily Democratic Seattle. During the initial ballot count, the lead changed hands several times.

=== Predictions ===
Source	Ranking	As of
Sabato's Crystal Ball	Lean R (flip)	November 1, 2004

=== Endorsements ===
Dino Rossi (R)

State senators

- Tim Sheldon, LD-35 (1997–2023) (Democratic)

Newspapers

- The Seattle Times

=== Polling ===
Pollster	Date(s) administered	Sample size (Note: Key: A – all adults RV – registered voters LV – likely voters V – unclear)	Margin of error	Christine Gregoire (D)	Dino Rossi (R)	Other / Undecided	Reference
SurveyUSA	October 29–31, 2004	620 (LV)	± 4.0%	45%	51%	4%	
Strategic Vision	October 24–27, 2004	801 (LV)	± 3.0%	47%	42%	11%	
Mason-Dixon	October 25–26, 2004	800 (RV)	± 3.5%	48%	43%	9%	
Elway Poll	October 14–16, 2004	405 (RV)	± 5.0%	45%	38%	17%	

=== Candidates ===
- Ruth Bennett (L), chair of the Libertarian Party of Washington
- Christine Gregoire (D), attorney general of Washington
- Dino Rossi (R), state senator

=== Debates ===
- Complete video of debate, October 13, 2004 - C-SPAN
- Complete video of debate, October 17, 2004 - C-SPAN

=== Initial results ===
Washington was unusual for a U.S. state in that it only required that an absentee ballot be postmarked by the day of the election to be valid, while most other states required the ballot to have arrived at the election office by that time. Due to this as well as the state's high number of absentee ballots—more than 60% of all King County voters voted absentee—the initial result of the election was not known until November 17, the last day under state law for election results to be certified by each county's election officials.

The initial result, as reported by Secretary of State Sam Reed, showed Rossi with a lead of 261 votes, well within the margin for an automatic machine recount pursuant to Washington state law (less than 0.5% and less than 2,000 votes). After a statewide recount completed on November 24, Rossi again came away with the lead, this time by 42 votes.

=== Manual recount ===
After Rossi was certified as the victor on November 29, the Washington State secretary of state said that "a manual recount was almost a certainty." This view was shared by the Gregoire campaign, with campaign spokesman Morton Brilliant saying that "if all the ballots aren't counted, we will go through the next four years with one candidate's supporters not believing the winner was legitimately elected." and that it was "worth taking three weeks to have four years of legitimacy, and that's what is at stake."

In Washington, a candidate may request one hand count or machine count, provided that they pay for the estimated cost of the recount up front. If a manual recount overturns the outcome of an election, the state will then refund the money to the candidate. On December 3, the Washington State Democratic Party gave a $730,000 check to the Secretary of State for the statewide manual recount of nearly 3 million ballots. The Secretary of State issued the order for a recount on Monday, December 6. The next day, attorneys for the Democratic Party and the Secretary of State argued before the Washington State Supreme Court over terms for the recount. The Democrats argued for a universal standard to be applied to the manual recount, and for the retabulation of votes over simply recanvassing them. Attorneys for the secretary of state replied, saying that any retabulation of votes would be a violation of state election laws and the Washington State Constitution. Two days later, the Supreme Court issued their opinion and rejected universal standards in the statewide recount.

=== Discovered ballots ===
King County Council Chairman Larry Phillips was at a Democratic Party office in Seattle on Sunday December 12, reviewing a list of voters whose absentee votes had been rejected due to signature problems, when to his surprise he found his own name listed. Phillips said he was certain he had filled out and signed his ballot correctly, and asked the county election officials to investigate the discrepancy. They discovered that Phillips' signature had somehow failed to be scanned into the election computer system after he submitted his request for an absentee ballot. Election workers claimed that they had received Phillips' absentee ballot in the mail, but they could not find his signature in the computer system to compare to the one on the ballot envelope, so they mistakenly rejected the ballot instead of following the standard procedure of checking it against the signature of Phillips' physical voter registration card that was on file. The discovery prompted King County Director of Elections Dean Logan to order his staff to search the computers to see if any other ballots had been incorrectly rejected.

Logan announced on December 13 that 561 absentee ballots in the county had been wrongly rejected due to an administrative error. The next day, workers retrieving voting machines from precinct storage found an additional 12 ballots, bringing the total to 573 newly discovered ballots. Logan admitted the lost ballots were an oversight on the part of his department, and insisted that the found ballots be counted. On December 15, the King County Canvassing Board voted 2–1 in favor of counting the discovered ballots.

Upon examination of the discovered ballots, it was further discovered that, with the exception of two ballots, none of the ballots had been cast by voters whose surnames began with the letters A, B, or C. There was a further search for more ballots, and on December 17, county workers discovered a tray in a warehouse with an additional 162 previously uncounted ballots. All together, 735 uncounted or improperly rejected ballots were discovered in King County during the manual hand recount.

Chairman of the Washington State Republican Party Chris Vance stated that he was "absolutely convinced that King County is trying to steal this election." The National Rifle Association, which had endorsed Rossi, sent a mass e-mail on December 14 to its members asking for volunteers to go to King County in order to sit in on the county elections office and observe the recount.

The Washington State Republican Party filed a restraining order in Pierce County District Court, requesting an injunction against King County to block the tabulation of the uncounted ballots. The request was granted on December 17, but Democrats appealed to the Supreme Court. On December 22, the court ruled against the Republican Party and overturned the restraining order, allowing King County to count all ballots. The next day, Sam Reed issued a statement explaining the process for certification of the uncounted ballots and the standards for fair voting practices in the state.

After all other counties submitted their recount votes, it was revealed on December 20 that at least five other counties besides King County had included ballots that had been discovered after the initial count. For example, Snohomish County included 224 missed ballots that had been discovered underneath mail trays. The outcome of the State Supreme Court hearing regarding King County's votes could have potentially affected those counties' counts as well.

=== Final results ===
The state Democratic party claimed on December 21 that the result of the manual recount, including King County's votes, placed Gregoire ahead by eight votes across the state. Later, on December 22, the preliminary recount results put Gregoire at a ten-vote lead.

Washington state law allows for election officials to evaluate voter intent and correct ballots so that the machines can properly read them. For example, on a Scantron or other optical ballot, an election official might fill in a circle that was not properly marked so that the machine may record the vote. Republicans filed a federal lawsuit to stop the visual examination of ballots, claiming that it is not allowed under federal law (Equal Protection clause of the 14th Amendment). The Republican Party was contending that the method King County was using was different from that of other counties, therefore treating voters in King County differently from those in others. However, the court ruled that this was not the case, as King County was counting their ballots in a manner similar to that of other counties.

A Pierce County Superior Court judge ruled that ballots should not be counted, but on December 22, the Supreme Court ruled unanimously that counties explicitly have the ability to correct ballot consideration errors made during earlier counts. Of those 732 ballots, 566 were accepted as having valid signatures and were added to the existing total on December 23. The final results of the hand count, as of December 23, had Christine Gregoire ahead by 130 votes, which was later revised to 129 when it was discovered that Thurston County had added a vote after certification had been completed. Since the recount results were in favor of the party requesting the recount, the Democrats were reimbursed the recount costs they had advanced to the state.

The Republicans were already preparing for further legal action before the final tally was announced by canvassing Republican voters whose ballots had been rejected. On December 29, Rossi called for a re-vote, saying that "this election has been a total mess" and that a "revote would be the best solution for the people of our state and would give us a legitimate governorship". This solution had been rejected by the Democrats and Republican Secretary of State Sam Reed because Washington's election law contains no re-vote provision, which left a lawsuit the only other option. Reed officially certified the results of the manual recount on December 30, declaring Gregoire the governor-elect.

=== Results of recount ===
2004 Washington gubernatorial election
Party	Candidate	Votes	%	±%
Democratic	Christine Gregoire	1,373,361	48.87	−9.51
Republican	Dino Rossi	1,373,232	48.87	+9.19
Libertarian	Ruth Bennett	63,465	2.26	+0.32
Total votes		2,810,058	100.00	N/A
Democratic hold				

==== By county ====
By county

County	Christine Gregoire Democratic		Dino Rossi Republican		Ruth Bennett Libertarian		Margin		Total
County	%	#	%	#	%	#	%	#	Total
Adams	30.03%	1,529	68.38%	3,481	1.59%	81	–38.34%	–1,952	5,091
Asotin	40.87%	3,530	56.89%	4,914	2.23%	193	–16.02%	–1,384	8,637
Benton	30.12%	19,834	68.18%	44,895	1.70%	1,118	–38.06%	–25,061	65,847
Chelan	34.70%	10,077	63.50%	18,438	1.80%	523	–28.79%	–8,361	29,038
Clallam	45.10%	16,230	52.34%	18,836	2.56%	920	–7.24%	–2,606	35,986
Clark	44.71%	72,828	52.75%	85,924	2.53%	4,123	–8.04%	–13,096	162,875
Columbia	32.28%	671	65.95%	1,371	1.78%	37	–33.67%	–700	2,079
Cowlitz	48.87%	20,204	48.48%	20,045	2.65%	1,094	0.38%	159	41,343
Douglas	32.92%	4,360	65.43%	8,667	1.65%	219	–32.52%	–4,307	13,246
Ferry	38.77%	1,278	57.65%	1,900	3.58%	118	–18.87%	–622	3,296
Franklin	31.42%	4,977	67.14%	10,634	1.43%	227	–35.72%	–5,657	15,838
Garfield	33.10%	428	64.97%	840	1.93%	25	–31.86%	–412	1,293
Grant	30.33%	7,821	67.60%	17,431	2.07%	535	–37.27%	–9,610	25,787
Grays Harbor	49.45%	13,729	48.47%	13,457	2.07%	575	0.98%	272	27,761
Island	44.80%	16,895	53.04%	20,000	2.16%	814	–8.23%	–3,105	37,709
Jefferson	57.85%	10,650	39.62%	7,295	2.53%	466	18.22%	3,355	18,411
King	57.75%	506,194	40.08%	351,306	2.16%	18,952	17.67%	154,888	876,452
Kitsap	48.02%	56,236	49.33%	57,775	2.64%	3,097	–1.31%	–1,539	117,108
Kittitas	38.36%	6,125	59.91%	9,567	1.73%	277	–21.55%	–3,442	15,969
Klickitat	43.78%	3,919	53.26%	4,767	2.96%	265	–9.47%	–848	8,951
Lewis	32.17%	10,247	65.46%	20,851	2.38%	757	–33.29%	–10,604	31,855
Lincoln	32.82%	1,850	65.40%	3,686	1.77%	100	–32.58%	–1,836	5,636
Mason	47.20%	11,797	50.08%	12,519	2.72%	680	–2.89%	–722	24,996
Okanogan	38.09%	6,107	59.00%	9,460	2.92%	468	–20.91%	–3,353	16,035
Pacific	50.90%	5,210	46.21%	4,730	2.89%	296	4.69%	480	10,236
Pend Oreille	41.99%	2,567	55.09%	3,368	2.93%	179	–13.10%	–801	6,114
Pierce	46.82%	145,431	50.84%	157,905	2.34%	7,255	–4.02%	–12,474	310,591
San Juan	59.60%	5,872	37.15%	3,660	3.25%	320	22.45%	2,212	9,852
Skagit	44.94%	23,250	52.61%	27,219	2.44%	1,264	–7.67%	–3,969	51,733
Skamania	45.24%	2,233	51.15%	2,525	3.61%	178	–5.92%	–292	4,936
Snohomish	47.72%	139,189	49.93%	145,628	2.35%	6,861	–2.21%	–6,439	291,678
Spokane	45.28%	90,581	52.78%	105,584	1.94%	3,881	–7.50%	–15,003	200,046
Stevens	35.22%	6,992	61.93%	12,295	2.85%	566	–26.71%	–5,303	19,853
Thurston	53.14%	58,970	44.54%	49,426	2.32%	2,575	8.60%	9,544	110,971
Wahkiakum	46.12%	993	51.05%	1,099	2.83%	61	–4.92%	–106	2,153
Walla Walla	35.31%	8,008	63.02%	14,290	1.67%	378	–27.70%	–6,282	22,676
Whatcom	49.94%	44,072	47.59%	42,000	2.47%	2,179	2.35%	2,072	88,251
Whitman	44.02%	7,722	53.38%	9,365	2.60%	457	–9.37%	–1,643	17,544
Yakima	34.29%	24,755	63.83%	46,079	1.87%	1,351	–29.54%	–21,324	72,185
Total	48.87%	1,373,361	48.87%	1,373,232	2.26%	63,465	0.00%	129	2,810,058

County	Christine Gregoire (D)				Dino Rossi (R)				Ruth Bennett (L)			
County	Initial result^{1}	Machine recount^{2}	Manual recount^{3}	Gain / loss	Initial result^{1}	Machine recount^{2}	Manual recount^{3}	Gain / loss	Initial result^{1}	Machine recount^{2}	Manual recount^{3}	Gain / loss
Adams	1,517	1,529	1,529	0	3,459	3,486	3,481	-5	79	81	81	0
Asotin	3,524	3,525	3,530	+5	4,905	4,904	4,914	+10	193	193	193	0
Benton	19,830	19,831	19,834	+3	44,888	44,890	44,895	+5	1,119	1,118	1,118	0
Chelan	10,074	10,077	10,077	0	18,436	18,437	18,438	+1	523	523	523	0
Clallam	16,225	16,226	16,230	+4	18,831	18,832	18,836	+4	919	919	920	+1
Clark	72,797	72,800	72,828	+28	85,887	85,894	85,924	+30	4,123	4,123	4,123	0
Columbia	670	671	671	0	1,370	1,370	1,371	+1	37	37	37	0
Cowlitz	20,236	20,207	20,204	-3	20,087	20,047	20,045	-2	1,094	1,093	1,094	+1
Douglas	4,357	4,359	4,360	+1	8,662	8,666	8,667	+1	218	219	219	0
Ferry	1,275	1,278	1,278	0	1,898	1,900	1,900	0	118	118	118	0
Franklin	4,968	4,967	4,977	+10	10,618	10,619	10,634	+15	226	227	227	0
Garfield	427	428	428	0	839	840	840	0	25	25	25	0
Grant	7,800	7,826	7,821	-5	17,385	17,429	17,431	+2	534	535	535	0
Grays Harbor	13,713	13,719	13,729	+10	13,444	13,449	13,457	+8	575	575	575	0
Island	16,888	16,888	16,895	+7	19,992	19,997	20,000	+3	814	814	814	0
Jefferson	10,641	10,642	10,650	+8	7,293	7,289	7,295	+6	465	466	466	0
King	505,243	505,836	506,194	+358	350,779	351,127	351,306	+179	18,906	18,936	18,952	+16
Kitsap	56,149	56,164	56,236	+72	57,712	57,693	57,775	+82	3,097	3,090	3,097	+7
Kittitas	6,106	6,125	6,125	0	9,541	9,567	9,567	0	275	277	277	0
Klickitat	3,919	3,919	3,919	0	4,766	4,767	4,767	0	265	265	265	0
Lewis	10,243	10,245	10,247	+2	20,838	20,842	20,851	+9	756	756	757	+1
Lincoln	1,850	1,850	1,850	0	3,685	3,686	3,686	0	100	100	100	0
Mason	11,787	11,788	11,797	+9	12,505	12,507	12,519	+12	681	682	680	-2
Okanogan	6,100	6,101	6,107	+6	9,451	9,450	9,460	+10	465	465	468	+3
Pacific	5,209	5,210	5,210	0	4,730	4,730	4,730	0	295	295	296	+1
Pend Oreille	2,561	2,567	2,567	0	3,364	3,366	3,368	+2	179	179	179	0
Pierce	144,957	145,199	145,431	+232	157,443	157,704	157,905	+201	7,230	7,241	7,255	+14
San Juan	5,872	5,872	5,872	0	3,661	3,660	3,660	0	320	321	320	-1
Skagit	23,195	23,266	23,250	-16	27,135	27,224	27,219	-5	1,260	1,267	1,264	-3
Skamania	2,232	2,232	2,233	+1	2,522	2,522	2,525	+3	178	178	178	0
Snohomish	138,939	139,070	139,189	+119	145,423	145,553	145,628	+75	6,842	6,852	6,861	+9
Spokane	90,452	90,573	90,581	+8	105,435	105,569	105,584	+15	3,872	3,878	3,881	+3
Stevens	6,992	6,992	6,992	0	12,293	12,293	12,295	+2	566	566	566	0
Thurston	58,953	58,955	58,970	+15	49,409	49,413	49,426	+13	2,574	2,575	2,575	0
Wahkiakum	993	993	993	0	1,099	1,100	1,099	-1	61	61	61	0
Walla Walla	7,947	8,006	8,008	+2	14,240	14,277	14,290	+13	376	381	378	-3
Whatcom	44,053	44,056	44,072	+16	41,978	41,978	42,000	+22	2,177	2,177	2,179	+2
Whitman	7,724	7.715	7,722	+7	9,367	9,363	9,365	+2	458	457	457	0
Yakima	24,735	24,735	24,755	+20	46,044	46,044	46,079	+35	1,351	1,351	1,351	0
Totals	1,371,153 (48.86%)	1,372,442 (48.8702%)	1,373,361 (48.8730%)	+919	1,371,414 (48.87%)	1,372,484 (48.8717%)	1,373,232 (48.8685%)	+748	63,346 (2.25%)	63,416 (2.2581%)	63,465 (2.2585%)	+49
Sources:^{1}"Initial results". Washington Secretary of State. Archived from the original on September 7, 2006.^{2} "First Recount Results". Washington Secretary of State. Archived from the original on February 14, 2007.^{3} "Second Recount Results". Washington Secretary of State. Archived from the original on February 14, 2007.

===== Counties that flipped from Democratic to Republican =====
- Asotin (largest city: Clarkston)
- Clallam (largest city: Port Angeles)
- Clark (largest city: Vancouver)
- Island (largest city: Oak Harbor)
- Kitsap (largest city: Bremerton)
- Klickitat (largest city: Goldendale)
- Mason (largest city: Shelton)
- Pend Oreille (largest city: Newport)
- Pierce (largest city: Tacoma)
- Skagit (largest city: Mount Vernon)
- Skamania (largest city: Carson)
- Snohomish (largest city: Everett)
- Spokane (largest city: Spokane)
- Wahkiakum (largest city: Puget Island)
- Walla Walla (largest city: Walla Walla)
- Whitman (largest city: Pullman)

== Aftermath ==
Republican leaders in Washington claimed there were enough disputed votes to change the outcome of the election and filed a lawsuit in Chelan County Superior Court in order to avoid having the case heard in the more liberal Western Washington counties. King County's election department (the greater Seattle area) was also targeted for how they handled the ballots, including untracked use of a "ballot-on-demand" printing machine. Also, ballots in six counties were discovered after the initial count and included in the recounts, the most being from King County. The judge hearing the lawsuit ruled that the Party did not provide enough evidence that the disputed votes were ineligible votes, or for whom they were cast, to enable the court to overturn the election.

Controversy over the election's outcome continued after the certification of the hand recount results. The Washington State Republican Party called into question the discrepancy between the list of voters casting ballots in King County (895,660) and the number of ballots reported in the final hand recount (899,199). They claimed that hundreds of votes, including votes by felons, deceased voters, and double voters, were included in the canvass. As an explanation, election officials claimed that they had yet to finalize the list at the time, and argued that discrepancies in the two numbers are common and do not necessarily indicate fraud. As the election officials had expected, once the two lists were completed on January 5, the two numbers were indeed very close to one another. Also on January 5, 2005, the Seattle Post-Intelligencer published an article investigating votes in King County apparently cast by dead people. The PI uncovered eight cases of votes attributed to dead people; these included one administrative error, two ballots cast by the spouses of recently deceased voters (one who voted against Gregoire), one case of a husband apparently voting his dead wife's ballot instead of his own, and a man who legally voted his absentee ballot and then died before election day. One dead woman was marked as having voted in person at the polls.

By law, the result of the election can be contested by any individual who files suit at any time up to 10 days after any inauguration, thereby making January 22 the latest date to have filed any suit. Two private citizens filed challenges to the election on January 6: Daniel P. Stevens of Fall City and Arthur Coday Jr. of Shoreline. The Republican party filed a suit on January 7 in Chelan County claiming that voters had been deprived of their right to a "free and fair election", and demanding a revote by special election. While the evidence focused especially on problems in King County, adjacent Chelan was chosen as the venue because it was more solidly Republican and the GOP questioned the ability of King County judges to rule impartially in such a case.

Neither suit asked for Gregoire's inauguration to be delayed, allowing governor Gary Locke to leave his post as scheduled. Gregoire was inaugurated on January 12. On February 4, Judge John E. Bridges, assigned by Chelan County to preside over the case, ruled that the court did not have the authority to order a re-election. However, in the same ruling, he also rejected the Democrats' argument that only the state legislature, which then had a Democratic majority, and not the court, had the sole authority to decide whether an election was invalid, thereby indicating that he intended to proceed to trial. Both sides declared victory over this early pre-trial ruling.

The Republicans presented data showing discrepancies in absentee ballot counts from 11 King County precincts. In some precincts, the county tallied more mail-in ballots than there were voters recorded as having voted by mail. In others, the opposite occurred—the county recorded more voters than ballots. The proof that ballots were fabricated for Democrats, Republican attorneys argued, is that four of the five precincts with the most excess mail-in ballots backed Gregoire. And as proof that ballots were misplaced or destroyed to harm Republicans, they pointed to the fact that four of the six precincts in which the most mail-in votes cannot be accounted for backed Republican Dino Rossi.

Additionally, the Republicans contended that King County was three days past its federally mandated due date of October 10 to send out its absentee ballots to overseas military personnel, widely considered more likely to vote Republican. The United States Postal Service Bulk Permit #1455 was used to mail 1,605 ballots on October 2, and 28,000 on October 13. The Republicans claimed that the delay may have prevented military service people from voting, thereby skewing the results in King County. On air, local talk radio host Bryan Suits claimed that his vote in particular was not counted while he performed military service in Iraq.

On February 19 Judge Bridges denied the Democratic motion calling for the challengers' burden of proof to include a comprehensive list of disputed ballots cast for each candidate. The Republicans acknowledged that such an exhaustive list would be impossible to complete, but continued to argue that the volume of illegal ballots, and the electoral tendencies of the counties in which they were cast, demonstrated a strong likelihood that the illegal ballots had led to Gregoire's victory. On February 26, as a part of the Republican suit, Rossi's legal team produced a list of 1,135 felons, deceased people, or people who allegedly voted twice, whom attorneys claimed influenced the outcome. A substantial number of the felon-voters were convicted as juveniles and were legally permitted to vote. Conservative columnists suggested that felons were more likely to vote for Gregoire. Most of the felon-voters resided in counties won by Rossi.

As a solution to the problem of the illegal voters, the Republicans proposed a solution of "proportional reduction". Republicans claimed that it should be assumed that illegal votes were cast in the same percentages as other votes in the same precinct. For example, in a precinct where Gregoire won 60% of the vote, it would have been assumed that she received 60% of the illegal vote as well, and those votes would be subtracted from her total for the precinct. The Democrats countered that the Republicans' proposal was statistically invalid, an example of the ecological fallacy, and the best solution would be to call each of the felons into court and ask them to swear under oath which political candidate they voted for, after which time their vote would be removed from the total.

The trial began on May 23, with both sides presenting their evidence of manipulation. On June 6, 2005, Judge John E. Bridges ruled that the Republican party did not provide enough evidence that the disputed votes were ineligible—or for whom they were cast—to overturn the election. Judge Bridges noted that there was evidence that 1,678 votes had been illegally cast throughout the state, but found that the only evidence submitted to show how those votes had been cast were sworn statements from four felons that they had voted for Rossi. He stated that the judiciary should exercise restraint; "unless an election is clearly invalid, when the people have spoken, their verdict should not be disturbed by the court." Nullifying the election, Bridges said, would be "the ultimate act of judicial egotism and judicial activism." He also concluded that according to his interpretation of the Washington Administrative Code, "voters who improperly cast provisional ballots should not be disenfranchised." He also rejected all claims of fraud and the Republican Party's statistical analysis, concluding that the expert testimony of the Republican party was "not helpful" and that the proportional reduction theory was not supported under any law in the state. Striking another blow against Rossi's court case, he stated that "the court is more inclined to believe that Gregoire would have prevailed under statistical analysis theory", rejecting the Rossi campaign's claim that improperly cast ballots led to Gregoire's victory.

Bridges did accept the claim that some people voted illegally in the election, but said there was little proof of which candidate benefited from those votes. He ruled that 1,678 illegal votes should be subtracted from the total number of votes cast. Bridges also removed five votes from the final count for two of the candidates: four for Rossi and one for Ruth Bennett. No evidence was brought before the court of any of the illegal votes benefitted Gregoire. The final margin of victory for Gregoire over Rossi was 133 votes. Rossi did not appeal to the state Supreme Court and the Washington State Republican party settled the case after paying $15,000 in court costs to the Democrats.

Judge Bridges' ruling was seen as a comprehensive defeat for Rossi. The judge admitted nearly every piece of evidence the Republican Party offered and then wrote a thorough, tough opinion rejecting the Republicans' claims (while criticizing the administration of the election, particularly in King County); Rossi was left with very little legal ground for a successful appeal. After receiving such a negative verdict, Rossi declined to appeal to the State Supreme Court, claiming that the political makeup of the Court would make it impossible for him to win, thereby ending all legal challenges to the election of Gregoire as the Governor of Washington.

The 2004 election became a focus of media attention again in early 2007 when news broke that eight federal prosecutors including John McKay, U.S. Attorney for the Western District of Washington, had been fired. Republicans had hoped that after the election McKay would begin a federal investigation into alleged voter fraud, but he did not; McKay stated afterward that he would not convene a grand jury for purely political reasons and emphasized he had not seen any evidence of voter fraud in the governor's race.

== See also ==
- List of close election results
- 2004 United States presidential election in Washington (state)
- 2004 United States House of Representatives elections in Washington
- 2004 United States Senate election in Washington
