= 2000 Washington Attorney General election =

- November 7, 2000
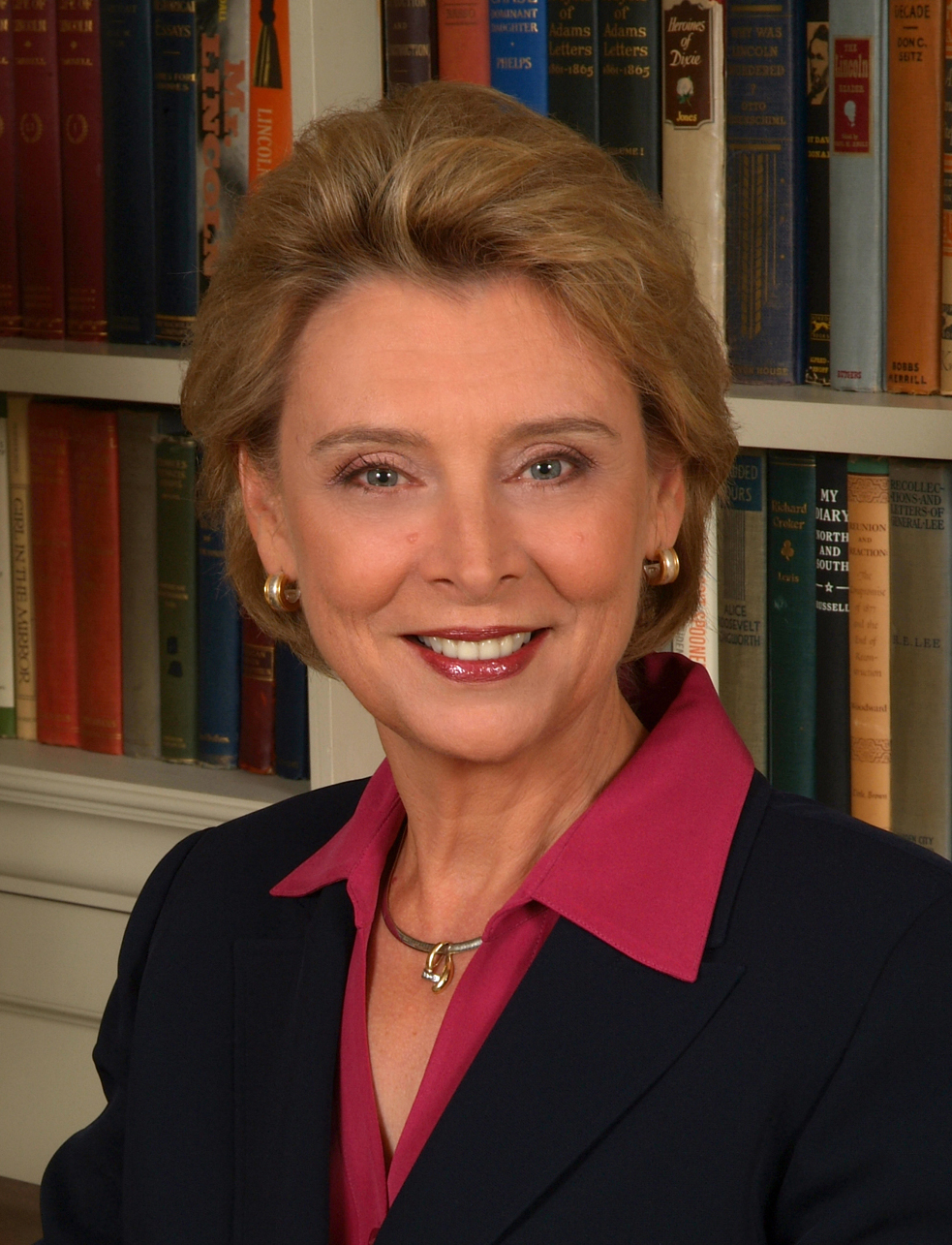

Nominee	Christine Gregoire	Richard Pope
Party	Democratic	Republican
Popular vote	1,292,887	883,002
Percentage	55.98%	38.23%
- County results Gregoire: 40–50% 50–60% 60–70% Pope: 40–50% 50–60%
Attorney General before election
Christine Gregoire
Democratic
Elected Attorney General
Christine Gregoire
Democratic

The 2000 Washington Attorney General election, took place on November 7, 2000. Incumbent attorney general and future governor, Christine Gregoire, was re-elected by a wide margin in a victory over Republican and perennial candidate Richard Pope.

== Results ==
2000 Washington Attorney General election
Party	Candidate	Votes	%	±%
Democratic	Christine Gregoire (incumbent)	1,292,887	55.98%	–4.06%
Republican	Richard Pope	883,002	38.23%	+2.77%
Libertarian	Richard Shepard	90,941	3.94%	+1.19%
Natural Law	Luanne Coachman	23,685	1.03%	–0.72%
Independent	Stan Lippmann	19,120	0.83%	N/A
Total votes		2,309,635	100.00%	N/A
Democratic hold				

=== By county ===
County	Christine Gregoire Democratic		Richard Pope Republican		Various candidates Other parties		Margin		Total
County	#	%	#	%	#	%	#	%	Total
Adams	1,925	41.80%	2,460	53.42%	220	4.78%	-535	-11.62%	4,605
Asotin	3,240	45.05%	3,477	48.35%	475	6.60%	-237	-3.30%	7,192
Benton	26,464	47.75%	26,246	47.36%	2,708	4.89%	218	0.39%	55,418
Chelan	9,729	39.66%	13,458	54.87%	1,342	5.47%	-3,729	-15.20%	24,529
Clallam	14,357	49.00%	12,945	44.18%	1,998	6.82%	1,412	4.82%	29,300
Clark	58,920	47.19%	58,424	46.80%	7,506	6.01%	496	0.40%	124,850
Columbia	767	39.60%	1,082	55.86%	88	4.54%	-315	-16.26%	1,937
Cowlitz	18,447	54.28%	13,420	39.49%	2,118	6.23%	5,027	14.79%	33,985
Douglas	4,659	38.74%	6,713	55.83%	653	5.43%	-2,054	-17.08%	12,025
Ferry	1,153	40.92%	1,426	50.60%	239	8.48%	-273	-9.69%	2,818
Franklin	6,351	47.65%	6,283	47.14%	694	5.21%	68	0.51%	13,328
Garfield	462	39.05%	643	54.35%	78	6.59%	-181	-15.30%	1,183
Grant	9,058	40.28%	12,160	54.07%	1,270	5.65%	-3,102	-13.79%	22,488
Grays Harbor	14,968	60.71%	8,034	32.58%	1,654	6.71%	6,934	28.12%	24,656
Island	15,579	50.98%	13,336	43.64%	1,643	5.38%	2,243	7.34%	30,558
Jefferson	8,769	59.01%	5,214	35.09%	877	5.90%	3,555	23.92%	14,860
King	454,104	62.68%	226,650	31.28%	43,769	6.04%	227,454	31.39%	724,523
Kitsap	53,977	55.01%	38,790	39.53%	5,351	5.45%	15,187	15.48%	98,118
Kittitas	6,595	50.36%	5,802	44.31%	698	5.33%	793	6.06%	13,095
Klickitat	3,401	45.84%	3,508	47.28%	510	6.87%	-107	-1.44%	7,419
Lewis	11,875	42.02%	14,738	52.16%	1,644	5.82%	-2,863	-10.13%	28,257
Lincoln	1,877	39.48%	2,625	55.22%	252	5.30%	-748	-15.73%	4,754
Mason	11,612	55.42%	7,931	37.85%	1,410	6.73%	3,681	17.57%	20,953
Okanogan	5,139	37.94%	7,393	54.58%	1,013	7.48%	-2,254	-16.64%	13,545
Pacific	5,020	58.27%	3,068	35.61%	527	6.12%	1,952	22.66%	8,615
Pend Oreille	2,341	46.19%	2,322	45.82%	405	7.99%	19	0.37%	5,068
Pierce	146,720	57.96%	93,487	36.93%	12,940	5.11%	53,233	21.03%	253,147
San Juan	4,504	58.36%	2,691	34.87%	523	6.78%	1,813	23.49%	7,718
Skagit	22,244	52.55%	17,610	41.60%	2,475	5.85%	4,634	10.95%	42,329
Skamania	1,804	46.10%	1,696	43.34%	413	10.55%	108	2.76%	3,913
Snohomish	132,148	55.90%	91,265	38.61%	12,990	5.49%	40,883	17.29%	236,403
Spokane	86,633	53.76%	65,700	40.77%	8,804	5.46%	20,933	12.99%	161,137
Stevens	6,551	39.83%	8,554	52.01%	1,342	8.16%	-2,003	-12.18%	16,447
Thurston	56,031	61.33%	29,877	32.70%	5,447	5.96%	26,154	28.63%	91,355
Wahkiakum	908	51.36%	749	42.36%	111	6.28%	159	8.99%	1,768
Walla Walla	9,294	46.87%	9,426	47.53%	1,111	5.60%	-132	-0.67%	19,831
Whatcom	36,183	53.98%	26,742	39.90%	4,100	6.12%	9,441	14.09%	67,025
Whitman	7,127	48.77%	6,586	45.07%	900	6.16%	541	3.70%	14,613
Yakima	31,951	48.51%	30,471	46.26%	3,448	5.23%	1,480	2.25%	65,870
Totals	1,292,887	55.98%	883,002	38.23%	133,746	5.79%	409,885	17.75%	2,309,635

Counties that flipped from Democratic to Republican

- Adams (largest city: Othello)
- Asotin (largest city: Clarkston)
- Chelan (largest city: Wenatchee)
- Columbia (largest city: Dayton)
- Douglas (largest city: East Wenatchee)
- Ferry (largest city: Republic)
- Grant (largest city: Moses Lake)
- Klickitat (largest city: Goldendale)
- Lewis (largest city: Centralia)
- Walla Walla (largest city: Walla Walla)

== See also ==
- 2000 Washington gubernatorial election
