= 2024 United States Senate election in Washington =

- November 5, 2024
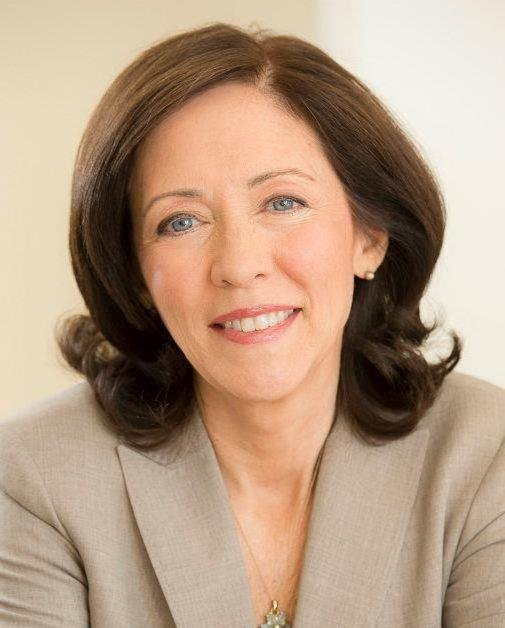

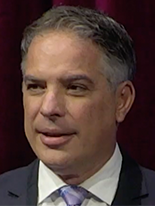
| Nominee | Maria Cantwell | Raul Garcia |
| Party | Democratic | Republican |
| Popular vote | 2,252,577 | 1,549,187 |
| Percentage | 59.09% | 40.64% |
- Cantwell: 40–50% 50–60% 60–70% 70–80% 80–90% >90% Garcia: 40–50% 50–60% 60–70% 70–80% 80–90% >90% Tie: 40–50% 50% No votes
U.S. senator before election
Maria Cantwell
Democratic
Elected U.S. Senator
Maria Cantwell
Democratic

The 2024 United States Senate election in Washington was held on November 5, 2024, to elect a member of the United States Senate to represent the state of Washington. Democratic incumbent Senator Maria Cantwell was elected to her fifth term, winning over Republican physician Raul Garcia.

Cantwell improved on her prior 2018 performance despite the Republican national environment. She won 59.09% of the vote, up from 58.43% in 2018 and marking a 1.6% leftward shift from that race. Washington had the smallest swing of any state in the concurrent presidential race, swinging rightward by under 1% from 2020.

Cantwell slightly outperformed Kamala Harris in the concurrent U.S. presidential election in Washington, winning Pacific County which also voted for Donald Trump. Cantwell won by a margin of 18.45%, narrowly higher than Harris's 18.22% margin.

Republicans have not won a Senate race in Washington since 1994.

== Primary election ==
The blanket primary election was held on August 6, 2024.

=== Democratic candidates ===
==== Advanced to general ====
- Maria Cantwell, incumbent U.S. senator

==== Eliminated in primary ====
- Paul Giesick, blue collar worker

=== Republican candidates ===
==== Advanced to general ====
- Raul Garcia, physician and candidate for governor in 2020

==== Eliminated in primary ====
- Goodspaceguy, amateur astronomer and perennial candidate
- Isaac Holyk, software development company CEO and candidate for U.S. Senate in 2022
- Scott Nazarino, financial consultant and candidate for U.S. Senate in 2016
- Mel Ram, private investigator

==== Declined ====
- John Guenther, retired state employee and candidate for U.S. Senate in 2022 (ran for U.S. House)

=== Third party and independent candidates ===
==== Eliminated in primary ====
- Thor Amundson (Independent), project expediter and perennial candidate
- Henry Dennison (Socialist Workers), political organizer and perennial candidate
- Chuck Jackson (Independent), merchant mariner and perennial candidate
- David Tilton (Independent), data analyst

=== Endorsements ===
Maria Cantwell (D)

Organizations

- American Israel Public Affairs Committee (AIPAC)
- EMILY's List
- Feminist Majority PAC
- Humane Society Legislative Fund
- Jewish Democratic Council of America
- Joint Action Committee for Political Affairs
- J Street PAC
- League of Conservation Voters
- Natural Resources Defense Council
- National Women's Political Caucus
- Planned Parenthood Action Fund
- Population Connection Action Fund

Labor unions

- National Education Association
- Washington State Labor Council

Newspapers

- The Seattle Times
- The Stranger

Tribes

- Confederated Tribes of the Colville Reservation
Raul Garcia (R)

U.S. representatives

- Dave Reichert (WA-08) (2005–2019)

Statewide officials

- Daniel J. Evans, former governor of Washington (1965–1977)
- Rob McKenna, former attorney general of Washington (2005–2013)
- Ralph Munro, former secretary of state of Washington (1981–2001)
- Sam Reed, former secretary of state of Washington (2001–2013)

State legislators

- Dino Rossi, former state senator (1997–2003, 2012, 2016–2017)

Local officials

- Bruce Dammeier, Pierce County Executive

Organizations

- Mainstream Republicans of Washington

Political parties

- Washington State Republican Party
- Spokane County Republican Party

=== Fundraising ===
Campaign finance reports as of June 30, 2024
| Candidate | Raised | Spent | Cash on hand |
|---|---|---|---|
| Maria Cantwell (D) | $11,651,974 | $5,128,836 | $7,093,030 |
| Raul Garcia (R) | $558,646 | $394,077 | $164,568 |
| Isaac Holyk (R) | $6,846 | $7,278 | $0 |
Source: Federal Election Commission

=== Results ===
County results Cantwell: 30–40%; 40–50%; 50–60%; 70–80%; Garcia: 30–40%; 40–50%

Congressional district results Cantwell: 40–50%; 50–60%; 60–70%; 80–90%; Garcia: 30–40%

Cantwell won 28 counties out of 39, including 9 out of the state's 10 most populous ones. She performed especially well in the most populous King County, as well as San Juan and Jefferson counties.

Blanket primary results
| Party | Candidate | Votes | % |
|---|---|---|---|
| Democratic | Maria Cantwell (incumbent) | 1,114,327 | 57.18% |
| Republican | Raul Garcia | 431,182 | 22.13% |
| Republican | Scott Nazarino | 111,386 | 5.72% |
| Republican | Isaac Holyk | 110,701 | 5.68% |
| Republican | Mel Ram | 86,956 | 4.46% |
| Independent | Chuck Jackson | 21,055 | 1.08% |
| Independent | David Tilton | 17,561 | 0.90% |
| Democratic | Paul Giesick | 17,433 | 0.89% |
| Republican | Goodspaceguy | 16,826 | 0.86% |
| Independent | Thor Amundson | 10,587 | 0.54% |
| Socialist Workers | Henry Dennison | 7,840 | 0.40% |
| Write-in | | 2,862 | 0.15% |
| Total votes | | 1,948,716 | 100.00% |

Combined partisan vote by county Democratic: 40–50%; 50–60%; 70–80%; Republican: 40–50%; 50–60%; 60–70%; 70–80%

Combined partisan vote by congressional district Democratic: 50–60%; 60–70%; 70–80%; 80–90%; Republican: 40–50%; 50–60%; 60–70%

==== Counties that flipped from Democratic to Republican ====
- Cowlitz (largest city: Longview)
- Klickitat (largest city: Goldendale)
- Skamania (largest city: Carson)
- Spokane (largest city: Spokane)
- Wahkiakum (largest city: Puget Island)
- Walla Walla (largest city: Walla Walla)

==== By congressional district ====
| District | Cantwell | Garcia | Nazarino | Holyk | Representative |
|---|---|---|---|---|---|
| 1st | 62% | 19% | 5% | 5% | Suzan DelBene |
| 2nd | 60% | 22% | 5% | 5% | Rick Larsen |
| 3rd | 46% | 27% | 7% | 8% | Marie Gluesenkamp Perez |
| 4th | 35.5% | 36.4% | 8% | 9% | Dan Newhouse |
| 5th | 43% | 30% | 7% | 9% | Cathy McMorris Rodgers |
| 6th | 58% | 21% | 5% | 5% | Derek Kilmer |
| 7th | 86% | 7% | 2% | 1% | Pramila Jayapal |
| 8th | 51% | 25% | 7% | 7% | Kim Schrier |
| 9th | 70% | 14% | 4% | 3% | Adam Smith |
| 10th | 57% | 21% | 7% | 5% | Marilyn Strickland |

== General election ==
=== Debate ===
2024 United States Senate election in Washington debate
| No. | Date | Host | Moderator | Link | Democratic | Republican |
| Key: P Participant A Absent N Not invited I Invited W Withdrawn | | | | | | |
| Key: P Participant A Absent N Not invited I Invited W Withdrawn | | | | | Maria Cantwell | Raul Garcia |
|---|---|---|---|---|---|---|
| 1 | Oct. 8, 2024 | Gonzaga University; KSPS-TV; The Black Lens; The Spokesman-Review; Washington State Debate Coalition | Orion Donovan Smith | TVW | P | P |

=== Predictions ===
| Source | Ranking | As of |
|---|---|---|
| The Cook Political Report | Solid D | November 9, 2023 |
| Inside Elections | Solid D | November 9, 2023 |
| Sabato's Crystal Ball | Safe D | November 9, 2023 |
| Decision Desk HQ/The Hill | Safe D | June 8, 2024 |
| Elections Daily | Safe D | May 4, 2023 |
| CNalysis | Solid D | November 21, 2023 |
| RealClearPolitics | Solid D | August 5, 2024 |
| Split Ticket | Safe D | October 23, 2024 |
| 538 | Solid D | October 23, 2024 |

=== Polling ===
Aggregate polls

| Source of poll aggregation | Dates administered | Dates updated | Maria Cantwell (D) | Raul Garcia (R) | Undecided (Note: Calculated by taking the difference of 100% and all other candidates combined.) | Margin |
|---|---|---|---|---|---|---|
| 270ToWin | October 20 - November 4, 2024 | November 4, 2024 | 55.5% | 38.0% | 6.5% | Cantwell +17.5% |
| TheHill/DDHQ | through November 3, 2024 | November 4, 2024 | 57.8% | 38.9% | 3.3% | Cantwell +18.9% |
| Average | | | 56.7% | 38.5% | 4.8% | Cantwell +18.2% |

| Poll source | Date(s) administered | Sample size (Note: Key: A – all adults RV – registered voters LV – likely voters V – unclear) | Margin of error | Maria Cantwell (D) | Raul Garcia (R) | Other | Undecided |
|---|---|---|---|---|---|---|---|
| Research Co. | November 2–3, 2024 | 450 (LV) | ± 4.6% | 58% | 38% | – | 4% |
| Public Policy Polling (D) (Note: Poll sponsored by the Northwest Progressive Institute) | October 16–17, 2024 | 571 (LV) | ± 4.1% | 53% | 38% | – | 9% |
| SurveyUSA (Note: Poll sponsored by The Seattle Times, KING-TV, and University of Washington Information School) | October 9–14, 2024 | 703 (LV) | ± 4.9% | 55% | 32% | – | 13% |
| Cascade PBS/Elway Research | September 3–6, 2024 | 403 (RV) | ± 5.0% | 55% | 33% | 4% (Note: "No answer" with 3%; "I may not vote in this race" with 1%) | 7% |
| Public Policy Polling (D) | July 24–25, 2024 | 581 (LV) | ± 4.0% | 55% | 32% | 6% (Note: "Another candidate" with 6%) | 7% |
| SurveyUSA | July 10–13, 2024 | 564 (LV) | ± 5.1% | 58% | 37% | – | 5% |
| Public Policy Polling (D) | May 15–16, 2024 | 615 (LV) | ± 4.0% | 53% | 38% | – | 9% |
| Cascade PBS/Elway Research | May 13–16, 2024 | 403 (RV) | ± 5.0% | 39% | 30% | 1% (Note: "Someone else" with 1%) | 30% |
| Echelon Insights (R) (Note: Poll sponsored by Concerned Taxpayers of Washington State PAC) | March 18–21, 2024 | 600 (RV) | ± 4.7% | 44% | 36% | – | 19% |
| Public Policy Polling (D) | February 13–14, 2024 | 789 (LV) | ± 3.5% | 53% | 37% | – | 10% |
| Public Policy Polling (D) | November 14–15, 2023 | 700 (LV) | ± 3.7% | 51% | 38% | – | 11% |
| Elway Research (Note: Poll sponsored by Crosscut.com) | October 30 – November 3, 2023 | 403 (RV) | ± 5.0% | 43% | 23% | 9% (Note: "A different Republican" with 6%; "A different Democrat" with 3%) | 25% |

Hypothetical polling

Maria Cantwell vs. Jaime Herrera Beutler

| Poll source | Date(s) administered | Sample size | Margin of error | Maria Cantwell (D) | Jaime Herrera Beutler (R) | Undecided |
|---|---|---|---|---|---|---|
| Public Policy Polling (D) | June 7–8, 2023 | 773 (LV) | ± 3.5% | 52% | 37% | 11% |
| Public Policy Polling (D) | March 7–8, 2023 | 874 (LV) | ± 3.3% | 50% | 35% | 14% |

=== Results ===
2024 United States Senate election in Washington
| Party | Candidate | Votes | % | ±% |
|---|---|---|---|---|
| Democratic | Maria Cantwell (incumbent) | 2,252,577 | 59.09% | +0.66% |
| Republican | Raul Garcia | 1,549,187 | 40.64% | −0.93% |
| Write-in | | 10,627 | 0.28% | N/A |
| Total votes | | 3,812,391 | 100.00% | N/A |
| Democratic hold | | | | |

==== By county ====
| County | Maria Cantwell Democratic | | Raul Garcia Republican | | Write-in Various | | Margin | | Total |
| County | # | % | # | % | # | % | # | % | Total |
|---|---|---|---|---|---|---|---|---|---|
| Adams | 1,627 | 31.44% | 3,504 | 67.71% | 44 | 0.85% | -1,877 | -36.27% | 5,175 |
| Asotin | 4,386 | 39.70% | 6,627 | 59.98% | 36 | 0.33% | -2,241 | -20.28% | 11,049 |
| Benton | 39,595 | 40.52% | 57,804 | 59.16% | 313 | 0.32% | -18,209 | -18.64% | 97,712 |
| Chelan | 18,884 | 45.89% | 22,168 | 53.87% | 96 | 0.23% | -3,284 | -7.98% | 41,148 |
| Clallam | 25,487 | 53.96% | 21,663 | 45.86% | 83 | 0.18% | 3,824 | 8.10% | 47,233 |
| Clark | 142,669 | 53.57% | 122,712 | 46.08% | 918 | 0.34% | 19,957 | 7.49% | 266,299 |
| Columbia | 745 | 30.81% | 1,658 | 68.57% | 15 | 0.62% | -913 | -37.76% | 2,418 |
| Cowlitz | 24,329 | 42.42% | 32,854 | 57.28% | 171 | 0.30% | -8,525 | -14.86% | 57,354 |
| Douglas | 7,892 | 38.32% | 12,637 | 61.37% | 64 | 0.31% | -4,745 | -23.04% | 20,593 |
| Ferry | 1,431 | 35.80% | 2,558 | 64.00% | 8 | 0.20% | -1,127 | -28.20% | 3,997 |
| Franklin | 12,538 | 40.71% | 18,212 | 59.13% | 50 | 0.16% | -5,674 | -18.42% | 30,800 |
| Garfield | 413 | 30.82% | 926 | 69.10% | 1 | 0.07% | -513 | -38.28% | 1,340 |
| Grant | 11,664 | 33.20% | 23,390 | 66.59% | 74 | 0.21% | -11,726 | -33.38% | 35,128 |
| Grays Harbor | 18,061 | 48.90% | 18,772 | 50.82% | 105 | 0.28% | -711 | -1.92% | 36,938 |
| Island | 29,216 | 57.28% | 21,677 | 42.50% | 114 | 0.22% | 7,539 | 14.78% | 51,007 |
| Jefferson | 17,621 | 72.28% | 6,708 | 27.52% | 49 | 0.20% | 10,913 | 44.77% | 24,378 |
| King | 828,204 | 75.06% | 271,832 | 24.64% | 3,370 | 0.31% | 556,372 | 50.42% | 1,103,406 |
| Kitsap | 91,348 | 59.55% | 61,734 | 40.24% | 327 | 0.21% | 29,614 | 19.30% | 153,409 |
| Kittitas | 11,028 | 42.98% | 14,556 | 56.73% | 73 | 0.28% | -3,528 | -13.75% | 25,657 |
| Klickitat | 5,962 | 45.42% | 7,125 | 54.28% | 40 | 0.30% | -1,163 | -8.86% | 13,127 |
| Lewis | 15,912 | 36.10% | 28,030 | 63.60% | 132 | 0.30% | -12,118 | -27.49% | 44,074 |
| Lincoln | 1,889 | 26.96% | 5,099 | 72.77% | 19 | 0.27% | -3,210 | -45.81% | 7,007 |
| Mason | 17,593 | 49.39% | 17,865 | 50.15% | 162 | 0.45% | -272 | -0.76% | 35,620 |
| Okanogan | 9,022 | 44.81% | 11,060 | 55.93% | 51 | 0.25% | -2,038 | -10.12% | 20,133 |
| Pacific | 7,273 | 52.46% | 6,552 | 47.26% | 38 | 0.27% | 721 | 5.20% | 13,863 |
| Pend Oreille | 2,721 | 32.67% | 5,585 | 67.05% | 23 | 0.28% | -2,864 | -34.39% | 8,329 |
| Pierce | 235,829 | 54.96% | 192,366 | 44.83% | 899 | 0.21% | 43,463 | 10.13% | 429,094 |
| San Juan | 9,466 | 74.38% | 3,214 | 25.26% | 46 | 0.36% | 6,252 | 49.13% | 12,726 |
| Skagit | 34,472 | 53.82% | 29,438 | 45.96% | 143 | 0.22% | 5,034 | 7.86% | 64,053 |
| Skamania | 3,206 | 45.28% | 3,855 | 54.44% | 20 | 0.28% | -649 | -9.17% | 7,081 |
| Snohomish | 239,059 | 58.85% | 166,117 | 40.90% | 1,020 | 0.25% | 72,942 | 17.96% | 406,196 |
| Spokane | 132,644 | 47.86% | 143,680 | 51.84% | 842 | 0.30% | -11,036 | -3.98% | 277,166 |
| Stevens | 8,138 | 29.59% | 19,270 | 70.06% | 96 | 0.35% | -11,132 | -40.47% | 27,504 |
| Thurston | 96,086 | 59.92% | 63,796 | 39.79% | 462 | 0.29% | 32,290 | 20.14% | 160,344 |
| Wahkiakum | 1,305 | 44.18% | 1,641 | 55.55% | 8 | 0.27% | -336 | -11.37% | 2,954 |
| Walla Walla | 13,621 | 47.06% | 15,293 | 52.83% | 32 | 0.11% | -1,672 | -5.78% | 28,946 |
| Whatcom | 83,355 | 61.53% | 51,836 | 38.26% | 290 | 0.21% | 31,519 | 23.26% | 135,481 |
| Whitman | 10,698 | 54.62% | 8,856 | 45.21% | 34 | 0.17% | 1,842 | 9.40% | 19,588 |
| Yakima | 37,188 | 44.24% | 46,517 | 55.34% | 359 | 0.43% | -9,329 | -11.10% | 84,064 |
| Totals | 2,252,577 | 59.09% | 1,549,187 | 40.64% | 10,627 | 0.28% | 703,390 | 18.45% | 3,812,391 |

==== By congressional district ====
Cantwell won seven of ten congressional districts, with the remaining three going to Garcia, including one that elected a Democrat.

| District | Cantwell | Garcia | Representative |
|---|---|---|---|
| 1st | 63% | 37% | Suzan DelBene |
| 2nd | 61% | 39% | Rick Larsen |
| 3rd | 49% | 50% | Marie Gluesenkamp Perez |
| 4th | 41% | 58% | Dan Newhouse |
| 5th | 45% | 54% | Cathy McMorris Rodgers (118th Congress) |
| 5th | 45% | 54% | Michael Baumgartner (119th Congress) |
| 6th | 59% | 41% | Derek Kilmer (118th Congress) |
| 6th | 59% | 41% | Emily Randall (119th Congress) |
| 7th | 86% | 13% | Pramila Jayapal |
| 8th | 52% | 48% | Kim Schrier |
| 9th | 71% | 28% | Adam Smith |
| 10th | 59% | 41% | Marilyn Strickland |

== Notes ==
Partisan clients
