= Richard Pope (politician) =

American lawyer (born 1962)

Richard Lamar Pope Jr. (born August 18, 1962) is an American attorney and perennial candidate from Bellevue, Washington.

== Early life and education ==
Pope was raised in New Orleans, Louisiana and received a BA in economics from Excelsior University before graduating with a JD summa cum laude from the University of Washington School of Law. While still a law student, he sued the University of Washington for withholding social security taxes from student employees ineligible for retirement programs. Though he scored an initial court victory against the university, it was ultimately reversed on appeal by the Washington Supreme Court.

Pope served seven years in the U.S. Army Reserve.

== Career ==
=== Law practice ===
After law school, Pope began to practice law in Washington, earning a reputation as a combative attorney. He has been cautioned by the Washington State Bar Association and fined by the state Court of Appeals. In 2006 he was removed from a case after informing the presiding judge that his mental health was "terrible" and that he suffered from "serious depression". Pope's law license was ultimately reinstated but he was reprimanded by the Washington State Bar Association in 2012 for misconduct in an unrelated matter. Pope is currently licensed to practice law in Washington but does not carry malpractice insurance.

=== Political campaigns ===
Pope has been elected and served as a Republican precinct committee officer, but has failed in at least a dozen attempts at higher office, running as both a Republican and a Democrat.

Despite his record of electoral failure, Pope has been called by HorsesAss "several steps above the crank perennial candidates" and "the most cost-efficient candidate this state has ever seen," regularly coming in second place in his races and scoring double-digit percentages of the vote. In his 2007 run against incumbent King County Council member Jane Hague, Pope received 41 percent of the vote, despite spending less than $35,000 on his campaign, compared to Hague's $433,000. His 2000 run against incumbent Attorney-General Christine Gregoire netted 636,738 votes, 38 percent of the total. Among other offices he's sought are those of Shoreline city councilor, Shoreline Water District commissioner, Port of Seattle commissioner, King County assessor, and King County prosecutor. Pope's best showing was in a non-partisan district court judge race in which he earned 44 percent of the vote.

Additionally, Pope has garnered a reputation as a dogged researcher of his political opponents. During the 2007 race against Hague, Pope uncovered numerous campaign finance violations committed by Hague and also exposed that the judge in Hague's DUI trial was a political ally of Hague, as a result of which he was reassigned. During a campaign for Port of Seattle commission in 2005, he successfully lodged complaints against incumbent Pat Davis' financial reporting that resulted in a $10,000 fine against Davis. Research Pope conducted into the King County Republican Party's finances exposed errors in campaign disclosures that resulted in the levy of $40,000 in fines. During the 2006 United States Senate election in Washington, Pope dug up records of Green Party candidate Aaron Dixon's unpaid child support, posting it to the comments sections of local blogs and helping to sink Dixon's upstart campaign.

== Personal life ==
Pope is divorced and has one daughter.

== See also ==
- Stan Lippmann
- Uncle Mover
- Goodspaceguy
