= Goodspaceguy =

American perennial candidate

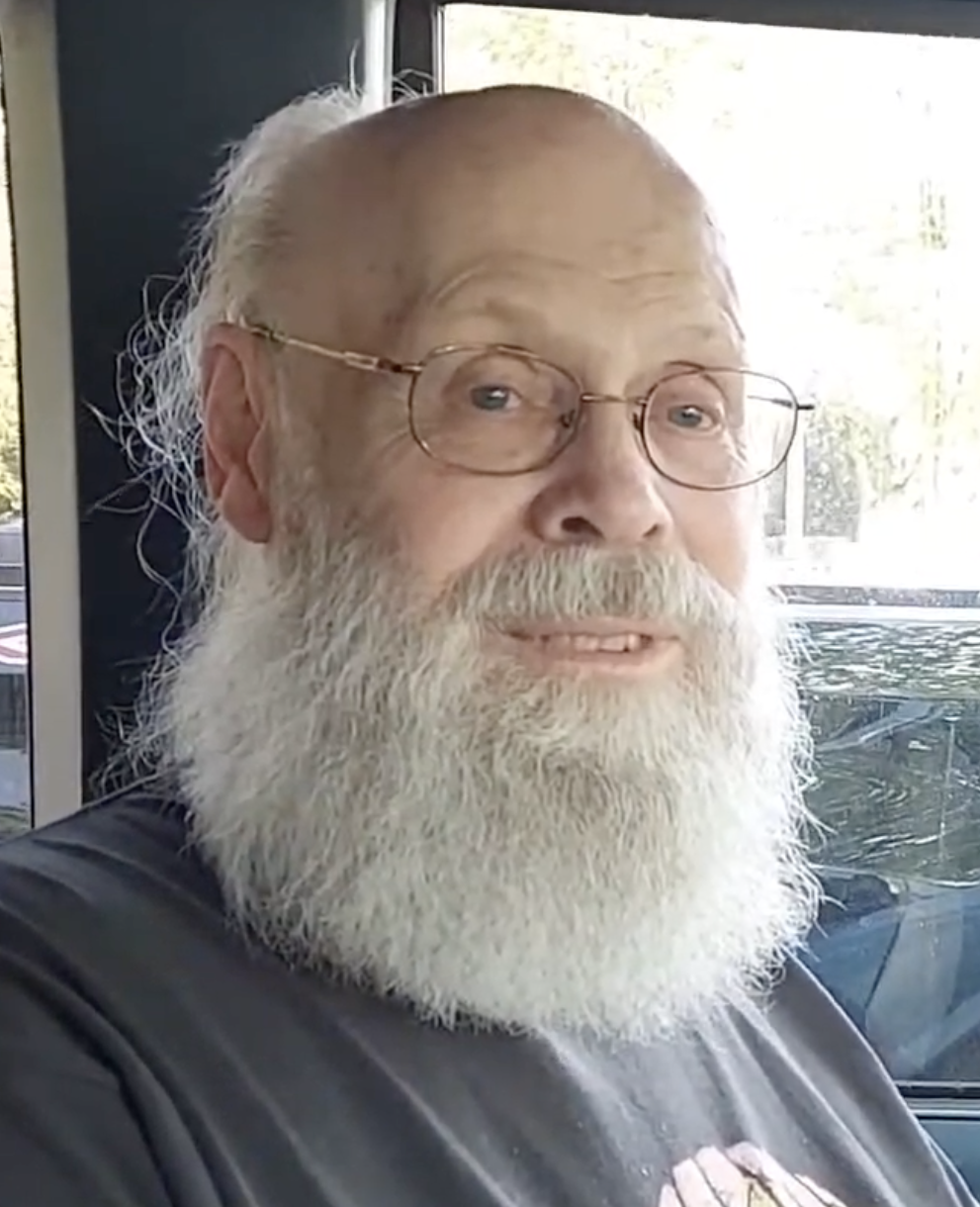
- Goodspaceguy in 2021
- Born: Michael George Nelson; Minneapolis, Minnesota, U.S.
- Education: University of Maryland (BA); University of Minnesota (MS)
- Political party: Democratic; Republican; Libertarian "Trump Republican" "Employmentwealth Party" "Work and Wealth Party"

Michael George Goodspaceguy Nelson (born Michael George Nelson), known mononymously as Goodspaceguy, is an American perennial candidate from Washington state.

== Early life and education ==
Born Michael George Nelson in Minneapolis, Minnesota, Goodspaceguy received a B.A. from the University of Maryland and a M.S. from the University of Minnesota. He legally added "Goodspaceguy" to his name in 2006, becoming Michael George Goodspaceguy Nelson.

== Career ==
Outside of politics, Goodspaceguy describes himself as "an amateur economist and astronomer." In his 2010 campaign profile, he lists his previous occupations as "accountant, chemical plant operator, economist, [and] investor".

By 2011, Goodspaceguy had sought public office 25 times, including those of United States Senator and Governor of Washington. Though never endorsed by a party, he has contested elections as a Democrat, Republican, Trump Republican, Libertarian and as a candidate of the non-existent "Employmentwealth Party" (under Washington elections law, candidates can declare their preference for any party, regardless of whether it actually exists).

In the 2014 race for Washington's 7th congressional district, Goodspaceguy identified himself with the "Work and Wealth Party." His best electoral showing was in the 2003 race for King County Council district 8, in which he polled 16 percent of the vote against Dow Constantine.

In addition to his frequent campaigns for local, state, and federal office, Goodspaceguy is a regular attendee of meetings of the Burien, Washington city council, during which he frequently participates in public comment sessions. Goodspaceguy ran for the Port of Seattle Commission in the August 4, 2015 primary, and preliminary results showed Goodspaceguy finishing second in a field of three candidates, with about 24,000 votes, or just over 9% of the total votes cast. He ultimately lost the general election to incumbent Courtney Gregoire, but garnered 48,000 votes (13% of the vote) in the process; Goodspaceguy was also endorsed by the 34th District Republicans prior to the general election, one of only two given by the group for the election alongside a Tim Eyman initiative. Goodspaceguy ran in the 2016 gubernatorial election in Washington, winning 13,191 votes in the primary but not advancing. Goodspaceguy was running for King County Executive in the 2017 election, and filed again in 2021 to run for the same office.

He again ran unsuccessfully in the 2018 United States Senate election in Washington, and for King County Council in 2019. His 2019 run garnered 4.52% of the vote, in comparison to the 16% he managed in his 2003 run for the same office.

He was a candidate for the 2020 gubernatorial election, stating his party preference as "Trump Republican", winning 5,646 votes in the primary. He ran in the 2024 United States Senate election as a Republican.

=== Political positions ===
Goodspaceguy's political positions generally revolve around his support for space exploration and space colonization. Goodspaceguy also calls for population control through a birth fee. He describes himself as "pro-choice on almost everything." Goodspaceguy opposes the Washington state minimum wage as it "destroys jobs".

== See also ==
- Richard Pope
- Uncle Mover
- Stan Lippmann
- John Patric
