= John E. Bridges =

American judge

John E. Bridges is a former jurist who presided over Chelan County Superior Court Judge in Washington state. He presided over the high-profile legal challenge to the 2004 Washington gubernatorial election in which he upheld the election of Christine Gregoire. He grew up in Chelan County, and graduated from Seattle Pacific University and the Gonzaga University School of Law. He was admitted to the Washington State bar association in 1976, and appointed to the bench by Gov. Booth Gardner in 1988.

Five years prior to the high-profile 2004 Washington gubernatorial election case, Judge Bridges presided over another trial in which he voided an election result. On December 29, 1999, Bridges invalidated the certified results of the November 2, 1999 Wenatchee, WA mayoral elections, because the certified winner, Gary Schoessler, did not meet the residency requirements for candidacy. The case had been brought by two local ministers, Sanford Brown and Kel Groseclose. Bridges' decision was upheld by the Washington Supreme Court in a unanimous decision on April 20, 2000.

Judge Bridges retired in 2011.
