= Christine Gregoire =

Governor of Washington from 2005 to 2013

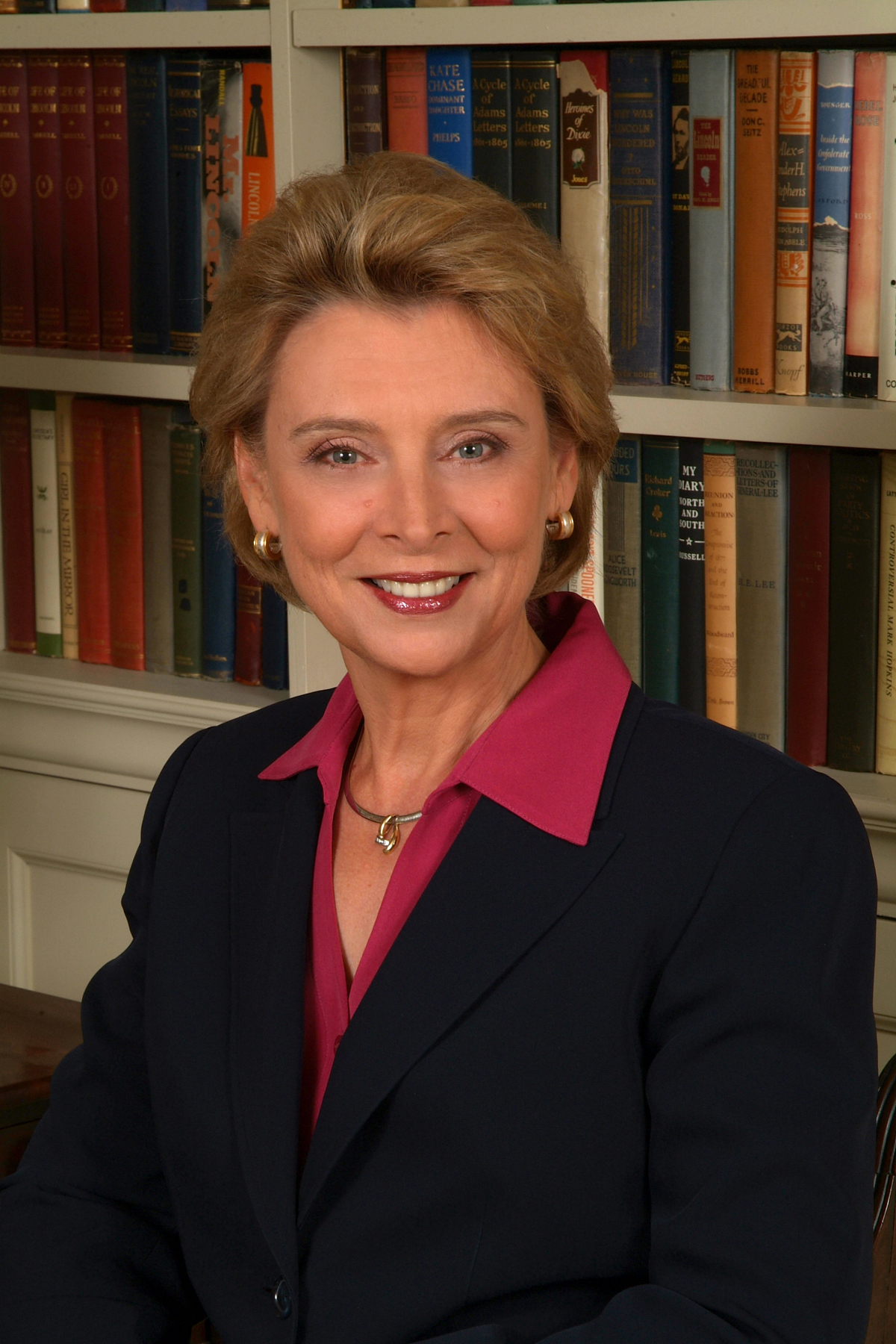
- Official portrait, 2006

22nd Governor of Washington
- In office January 12, 2005 – January 16, 2013
- Lieutenant: Brad Owen
- Preceded by: Gary Locke
- Succeeded by: Jay Inslee

Chair of the National Governors Association
- In office November 15, 2010 – July 17, 2011
- Preceded by: Joe Manchin
- Succeeded by: Dave Heineman

16th Attorney General of Washington
- In office January 13, 1993 – January 12, 2005
- Governor: Mike Lowry; Gary Locke
- Preceded by: Ken Eikenberry
- Succeeded by: Rob McKenna

Director of the Washington State Department of Ecology
- In office January 1, 1988 – January 6, 1992
- Governor: Booth Gardner
- Succeeded by: Chuck Clarke

Personal details
- Born: Christine O'Grady; March 24, 1947 (age 79) Adrian, Michigan, U.S.
- Party: Democratic
- Spouse: Mike Gregoire (m. 1974)
- Children: 2
- Education: University of Washington (BA); Gonzaga University (JD)
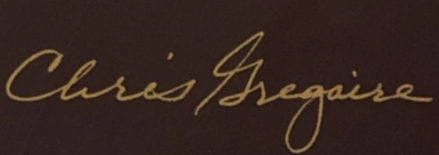
- Signature

Christine Gregoire (/ˈɡrɛɡwɑːr/; née O'Grady; born March 24, 1947) is an American attorney and politician who served as the 22nd governor of Washington, from 2005 to 2013. A member of the Democratic Party, she was elected in 2004 and re-elected in 2008, the first of which was the closest gubernatorial election in the history of Washington. She was the state’s second female governor. Gregoire served as chair of the National Governors Association from 2010 to 2011. She also served on the governors' council of the Bipartisan Policy Center.

Gregoire served as Attorney General of Washington from 1993 until 2005, and is the first and only woman to serve in that role. As of April 2025, she is also the oldest living former Governor of Washington, following the death of Daniel Evans in September of 2024.

== Early life, education, and legal career ==
Gregoire was born in Adrian, Michigan but was raised in Auburn, Washington, by her mother, Sybil Grace Jacobs (née Palmer), who worked as a short-order cook. After graduating from Auburn Senior High School, she attended the University of Washington in Seattle, graduating in 1969 with a Bachelor of Arts in speech and sociology. At UW, she became a member of the Sigma Iota chapter of the Kappa Delta sorority. She then attended Gonzaga University School of Law in Spokane, receiving her Juris Doctor in 1977.

Gregoire went to work as an assistant attorney general in the office of State Attorney General Slade Gorton, a Republican. As an assistant attorney general, Gregoire concentrated on child-abuse cases, coordinating with social workers to get children removed from abusive family situations and placed with relatives or foster homes, and was later appointed as the first female Deputy Attorney General. In 1988, at the end of his first term as governor of Washington, Booth Gardner appointed Gregoire director of the Washington Department of Ecology. During her tenure, Gregoire worked with Gardner to reach an agreement with the federal government to clean up nuclear waste at the Hanford nuclear site.

== Director of the Department of Ecology ==
Gregoire served four years as director before running for attorney general in 1992. During her tenure, she oversaw the creation of the Pacific States/British Columbia Oil Spill Task Force. Following an oil spill off the coast of Washington and British Columbia involving the barge Nestucca, Gregoire coordinated with the Canadian government to form a task force to handle concerns West Coast citizens had surrounding oil transportation.

=== Hanford Cleanup ===
While at the Department of Ecology, Gregoire worked with Gardner and representatives from the U.S. Environmental Protection Agency (EPA) and the U.S. Department of Energy to coordinate efforts on the Hanford Site cleanup. Known by many names, including the Hanford Project, Hanford Works, Hanford Engineer Works, and Hanford Nuclear Reservation, the nuclear facility along the Columbia River in Benton County produced plutonium. The site, established in 1943 to provide support for the Manhattan Project, operated from World War II through the Cold War. Decades of production of plutonium resulted in millions of gallons of high-level radioactive waste.

In 1989, the Washington State Department of Ecology along with the EPA and the US Department of Energy (DOE) entered into the Tri-Party Agreement, which sets targets, or milestones, for cleanup.

=== Centennial Accord ===
Following the contentious US v Washington case related to Native American fishing rights, commonly known as the “Boldt Decision,” Gardner undertook to build more lasting, friendly relationships with Washington's Native American tribes. The Accord served to bring parties to the table to negotiate their shared interests. Gregoire played a principal role in helping reach agreements about the natural resource distribution between the tribes and the state.

== Attorney General of Washington ==
Gregoire was elected attorney general in 1992 by 11 percentage points over her opponent, Norm Maleng, an attorney who served and was reelected seven times as King County prosecutor. She was Washington's first and only female attorney general. Gregoire was reelected in 1996 and 2000, both times over Richard Pope, by about 25 and 18 percentage points respectively.

As attorney general, Gregoire worked on children's issues, helped reform the juvenile system, passed a new ethics law for state government, strengthened rights for victims of identity theft, and worked to find alternatives to litigation in resolving legal disputes.

=== Tobacco master settlement agreement ===
During Gregoire's second term as attorney general, the tobacco industry was under fire for alleged fraudulent marketing, negligent advertising, and violation of several state consumer protection statutes. Multiple private suits stemming from a 1950s study in the British Medical Journal linked smoking to lung cancer and heart disease. Attorneys General on June 20, 1997, led by Gregoire negotiated a settlement that required tobacco companies to pay more than $206 billion over 25 years in reimbursements to the states for tax dollars spent to treat Medicaid patients for smoking-related illnesses. The companies also agreed to pay $50 million to national attorneys general for enforcement.

These payments funded children's health services and programs and a $25 billion trust for health-related issues. For her leading role in the litigation, Gregoire won the state of Washington a $4.5 billion share of the settlement over the next 25 years with the payments continuing in perpetuity. Gregoire and Governor Gary Locke asked the legislature to reserve portions of the settlement for restitution to the state and to establish a special account to finance a long-term tobacco prevention and control program. The account would be used to pay for anti-tobacco advertising and education, accessible cessation programs, and other activities.

In March 1999, Gregoire announced that Washington would receive at least an additional $394.9 million in settlement payments from the major tobacco companies.

Other portions of the agreement included enforcement of laws against tobacco sales to children, broad-based smoking prevention strategies, smoking cessation programs, full disclosure of tobacco's health effects, and preservation of an individual's right to sue the tobacco companies.

== Governor of Washington (2005–2013) ==
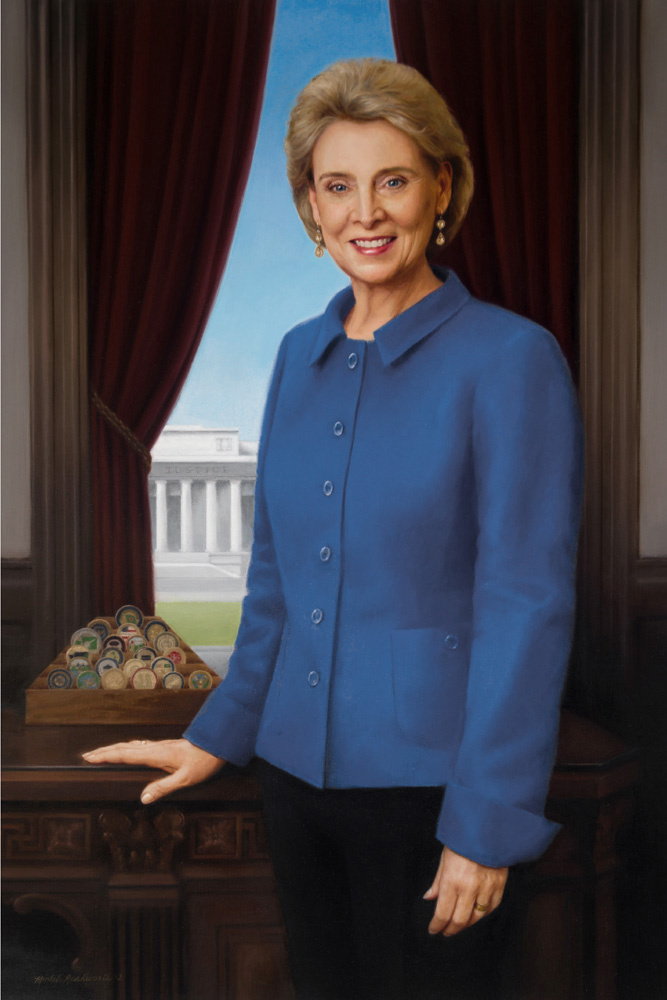
Official portrait of Gregoire, painted by Michele Rushworth

=== 2004 gubernatorial election ===
Gregoire defeated Ron Sims and four other minor candidates in the Democratic primary election on September 14, 2004. She had come under fire during the primary for her membership in Kappa Delta because of its nonwhite membership policy in the late 1960s. She clashed with Sims over her position at the sorority, but Sims dropped the issue and dismissed any claims of racism. Sims campaigned on tax reform and the institution of a statewide income tax. Gregoire won the primary with over 60% of the vote.

During the general election against former state senator and real estate agent Dino Rossi, Gregoire proposed a major initiative in life sciences, especially by increasing state funding for embryonic stem cell research. In debates, she tried to counter voter unease about the state government by saying she would "blow past the bureaucracy" and bring change herself. Gregoire won the backing of the legislature within six months after pushing through a number of important measures on car emission standards and unemployment benefits.

The election was held on November 2, 2004, with the initial count showing Gregoire trailing Rossi by 261 votes. A legally mandated machine recount reduced that lead to only 42 votes, then a hand count requested and funded by the state's Democratic Party gave Gregoire a 10-vote lead. Following a State Supreme Court ruling that allowed several hundred ballots from King County to be included, her lead further increased to 130 votes, but when the vote was certified by the state's Secretary of State, Sam Reed, at the end of December, one vote that had been counted in Thurston County past the deadline was disqualified and her lead was reduced to 129 votes. Washington's Republican leadership then filed suit, claiming that hundreds of votes, including votes by felons, deceased voters, and double voters, had been counted, but on June 6, 2005, Judge John E. Bridges ruled that the Republican Party had not provided enough evidence that the disputed votes were ineligible—or for whom they were cast—to overturn the election.

On October 28, 2004, the Seattle Times reported that out-of-state donors were contributing heavily to Gregoire's campaign. Trial lawyers who had worked closely with Gregoire on the 1998 tobacco settlement gave the Democratic Governors Association more than $1,000,000. According to the Times's analysis, nearly half of Gregoire's 2004 campaign contributions came from out of state.

=== 2008 gubernatorial election ===
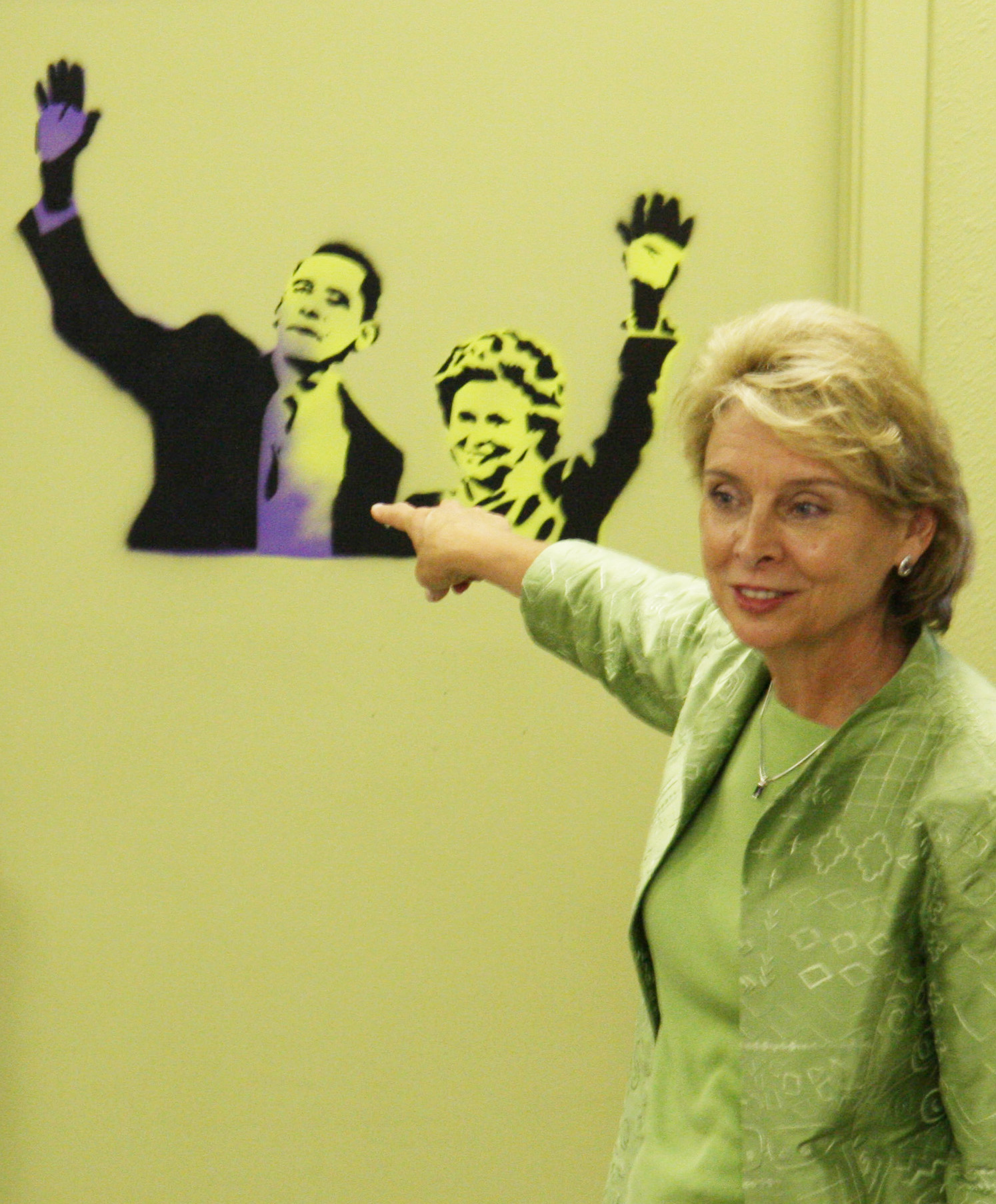
Gregoire at a campaign stop in August 2008

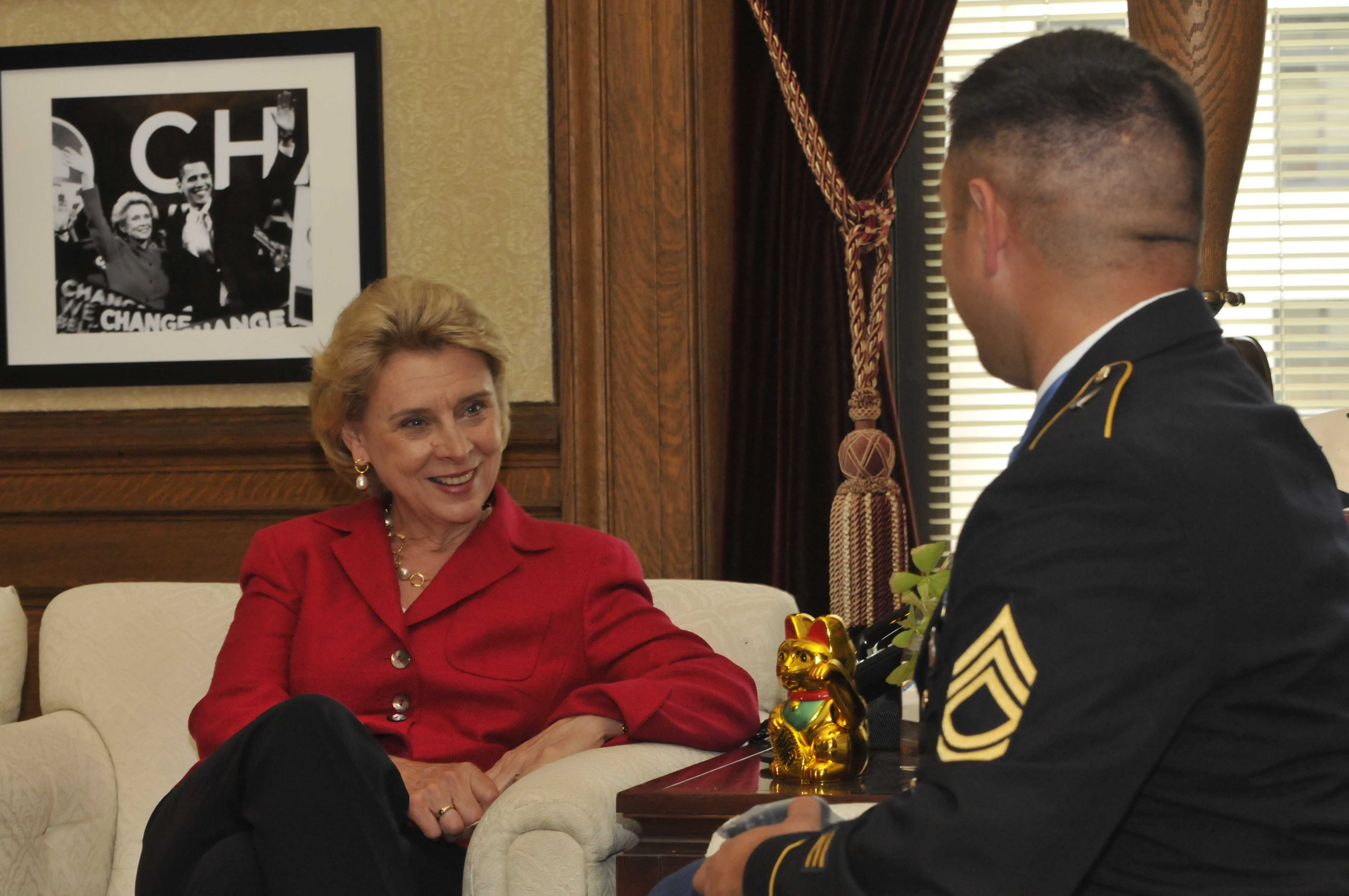
Sgt. Leroy Petry, visits Governor Gregoire in her office in Olympia.

During the 2008 Democratic presidential primaries, both Barack Obama and Hillary Clinton heavily lobbied Gregoire for her endorsement as a superdelegate.

Gregoire officially endorsed Obama on February 8, 2008, hours before an event at KeyArena in Seattle where she introduced him before a crowd of 18,000 people. The Washington caucuses were held the next day; Obama beat Clinton in every county.

Gregoire began her reelection campaign at her late mother's former employer, the Rainbow Café in Auburn, Washington, on April 7, 2008. Immediately after her announcement, she began a biodiesel bus tour of the state. Her opponent in the race, Dino Rossi, had announced his candidacy in October 2007.

Gregoire and Rossi fast approached fundraising records early in their campaigns. In April, Gregoire hosted a fundraiser with Bill Richardson at the Seattle Westin that netted the campaign over $300,000. In July, she held another large fundraiser with Michelle Obama at the WaMu Theater, with 1,600 attendees raising over $400,000.

The Seattle Times reported that Gregoire gave cost-of-living increases to state employees who hadn't received raises in "many years", and funded voter-approved initiatives to raise the pay of teachers, all groups that gave money to her 2004 recount campaign.

Gregoire won Washington's first ever top two primary on August 19, 2008, with 49% of the vote. She advanced to the general election against Rossi. The general election was expected to be close, but Gregoire benefited from large turnout among Democrats to vote for Obama in the concurrent presidential election and won with 53% of the vote. There was a marked geographical split in the 2008 election: the more populous and Democratic-leaning Western Washington counties supported Gregoire, while the less populous and more Republican-leaning Eastern Washington counties supported Rossi.

=== Reform areas ===
==== Education ====
During her time in office, Gregoire made sweeping changes to Washington's education system in areas such as the state government's responsibility in providing education, college readiness, expansion of early learning programs, as well as introducing new government-accountable educational goals.

Beginning her work with education months after taking office, Gregoire signed a host of bills in May 2005 to improve the state of education from early learning through college across the state. One such bill, E2SHB 1152 established an Early Learning Council dedicated to providing leadership in strengthening early learning programs and services available to children and their families. As a result of the Early Learning Council's work, Gregoire lobbied for the creation of a Department of Early Learning. On March 28, 2006, Gregoire signed into law a measure she had requested that consolidated Washington's scattered early learning and child-care programs into the Department of Early Learning.

Included in this 2005 package of education bills was Engrossed Second Substitute Senate Bill 5441. Introduced at Gregoire's request to establish a comprehensive education study steering committee, the legislature passed E2SSB 5441. It created a 13-member body to evaluate and reimagine Washington's education system for the modern economy. The group, chaired by Gregoire and comprising members representing business, government, philanthropy, the education committee, the legislature, and the public, met consistently for 18 months. It released a report in November 2006. It focused on five basic strategies to reform Washington's education system: (1) investing in early learning so that children start off as lifelong learners; (2) improving math and science teaching so that Washingtonians have a competitive edge; (3) personalizing learning so that every student has the opportunity to succeed; (4) offering college and workforce training for everyone; and (5) holding the system accountable for results.

Gregoire announced major education reforms that included developing criteria and standards for teacher evaluation, setting school performance requirements, and expanding teacher certification options. She signed the package into law.

In an ongoing effort to reform higher education in Washington, Gregoire asked the Higher Education Funding Task Force to look at college funding and performance options. On the task force's recommendation, on June 6, 2011, Gregoire signed into law several bills to improve Washington's education system. Additionally, on December 13, Gregoire proposed further education reforms to evaluate teachers and principals and designate six failing schools as “laboratory schools” to help improve student performance. She passed and signed those into law on March 8, 2012.

==== Public health ====
Washington was one of the first states to tackle rising health care and insurance costs. Gregoire proposed major health care reforms including changes in how the state purchased health care, consolidating state health care spending, and streamlining purchasing practices. As part of the reforms, Gregoire implemented a Health Care Cabinet to ensure the state was ready. She announced, “Washington is going to lead the nation in implementing health care reform.” Through the Health Insurance Partnership, Gregoire extended health care coverage to 1,100 small-business employees. She announced legislation to modernize the state's health care and pension system, while keeping health care inflation at 4-5% year. She announced “the promise of reform is a day when no one goes without health care coverage.

Gregoire pushed SB 5093, Washington State’s Cover All Kids Law, in March 2007. Advancing from this action, in 2009 Gregoire and the state legislature strengthened coverage during the financial crisis by passing HB 2128, the Apple Health For Kids Act.

On May 11, 2011, Gregoire signed six bills to transform Washington’s health care system. They included creation of a health care exchange to limit health care inflation to 4% over 10 years, saving citizens $26 billion in health care costs, and legislation consolidating the state’s two largest health care purchasers to make care programs more effective.

On January 13, 2012, Gregoire filed an amicus brief in support of the Affordable Care Act. On March 23 she created one of the nation’s first health benefit exchanges, giving buyers information on health care plans.

===== Affordable Care Act =====
Concurrently, as Gregoire made reforms in the state, she led implementation of the Federal Affordable Care Act (ACA). The ACA required the formation of a health insurance exchange in each state either by the federal government or the state. With an emphasis on extending health insurance coverage to low-income residents, Gregoire signed ESSB 5445 into law on May 11, 2011, making Washington the fourth state to implement the health insurance exchange provision.

Gregoire also signed ESSB 5122 and ESSB 5371 to conform state law with the ACA by extending insurance coverage to dependents under the age of 26, removing lifetime benefit maximums, and preventing insurance companies from denying coverage to people because of preexisting conditions.

===== Environment =====
Gregoire said she wanted to clean up Puget Sound by making it more “fishable, swimmable and diggable”. In 2007 she created the Puget Sound Partnership. The agency sets science-based priorities, spurs implementation of priority actions and ensures accountability.

On May 21, 2009, Gregoire issued an Executive Order directing state actions to cut greenhouse gases and battle climate change by increasing transportation and fuel-conservation options and protecting water supplies and vulnerable coastal areas.

On April 29, 2011, Gregoire fulfilled a longstanding goal and signed legislation that transitioned Washington state off of coal power. The announcement was made at the TransAlta coal plant.

==== Tribal relations ====
In October 2005, Gregoire sent a letter to the state's Gambling Commission recommending that it renegotiate a compact with the Spokane Native American tribe it had submitted for approval. The original compact would have allowed the tribe, and any other tribe that signed on to the compact, to have off-reservation gambling facilities, increase the number of slot machines allowed to 7,500, operate 24 hours a day, seven days a week, remove betting limits for some card players, and give credits to high rollers in exchange for sharing their gambling winnings with state and local governments. It was opposed by many of the state's lawmakers of both parties and anti-gambling groups that were concerned about the spread of gambling across the state, as well as other Native American tribes. The renegotiated compact, which was signed by the Spokane and 26 other Washington tribes, was signed by Gregoire in early 2007 and eliminated the revenue sharing and off-reservation facilities, but included an increase of allowed slot machines to 4,700 with a limit of 2,000 per location, increased the betting limit of some of its slot machines to $20, and allowed high-stakes gambling on blackjack and poker tables to players who pass financial screening and aren't known problem gamblers. The tribe also agreed to donate 2% of the gross revenue from table games and 1% from gambling devices to charity.

==== LGBT rights ====
A landmark gay civil rights bill failed in the 2005 session but passed in the 2006 session. It was primarily responsible for expanding the scope of protected classes to include sexual orientation and gender identity in cases of discrimination. The bill was originally requested and subsequently signed by Gregoire on January 31, 2006. She also signed a law on April 21, 2007, granting same-sex couples domestic partnership rights.

Gregoire signed Senate Bill 5688 ensuring state-registered domestic partners have the same rights as married spouses, further extending rights to LGBTQ+ Washingtonians. Opponents gathered signatures to put 2009 Washington Referendum 71 on the ballot in an attempt to repeal the bill. Washington voters approved the measure 53% to 47% in the country's first statewide referendum to extend domestic partnership rights to LGBT citizens.

On January 4, 2012, Gregoire announced her support for same-sex marriage and pledged to sign a marriage bill if it were passed by the legislature. The bill was passed on February 8, 2012. Gregoire signed the bill on February 13. Opponents of the bill collected the necessary signatures to place it Referendum 74 on the November ballot, where it was approved by 53.7% of the voters. The law took effect December 6.

==== Transportation ====
In March 2006, Gregoire's requested bill, SB 6508, was signed into law. The law directly affected transportation fuels by requiring fuel suppliers to ensure that 2% of the diesel and 2% of the gasoline they provide for sale is biodiesel and ethanol as of December 2008. The measure was the nation's first requirement for alternative fuels.

In 2009, Gregoire led public and political support to build two of the nation's largest infrastructure projects, replacement of the 520 floating bridge and a plan to replace the aging and earthquake vulnerable State Route 99 Alaskan Way Viaduct with a deep bore tunnel. At the time, the tunnel was the world's largest deep bore tunnel project. The 520 floating bridge is the world's longest floating bridge and opened in 2016. Seattle's new waterfront tunnel opened in 2019, making way for a revitalized new waterfront.

Bridging transportation and the environment in 2010, Gregoire announced the nation's first “electric highway,” an initial network of electric vehicle recharging stations along the I-5 corridor. Additionally, she used more than $13 million in Recovery Act grants to help train Washington workers for “green-collar” jobs in energy efficiency and renewable energy industries.

Along with Oregon Governor Kitzhaber, Gregoire announced support for the Columbia River Crossing to replace the aging I-5 bridge connecting Washington and Oregon.

Gregoire signed the 2011–2013 transportation budget putting 30,000 people to work and investing $5.6 billion into more than 800 transportation construction projects.

==== Medical marijuana ====
Together with Governor Lincoln Chaffee (I-RI), on November 30, 2011, Gregoire filed a petition with the Drug Enforcement Administration (DEA) asking to reschedule marijuana as a Schedule 2 drug, allowing its use for treatment as prescribed by doctors and filled by pharmacists.

==== Life Sciences Discovery Fund ====
On May 12, 2005, Gregoire signed a bill creating the Life Sciences Discovery Fund, which gives grants for research in health and agriculture. With funding from the tobacco settlement, which Gregoire secured, the state was able to combine funds with the Bill & Melinda Gates Foundation, Microsoft, the Paul G. Allen Family foundation and others to impact research on cures for debilitating diseases and improvement of the quality and yield of agricultural products.

==== Aerospace ====
In 2009, Gregoire set out to increase Washington's aerospace focus. By singling out Boeing and looking at working with local businesses, schools, and unions, Gregoire formed the Aerospace Council, which was tasked with developing aerospace-skills training, research and development.

As home to global aerospace, with more than 84,000 aerospace employees and more than 650 aerospace supply companies, Gregoire commended Boeing on the completion and delivery of its first 787 Dreamliner in Seattle.

=== Government reforms ===
On June 15, 2011, Gregoire signed the 2011–2013 budget taking into account the ideas presented by the public and the Transforming Washington's Budget Committee. Changes included a reform to the pension system saving $368 million in the following two years and setting up a user-pay system for state parks and other services.

On September 30, 2011, Gregoire completed the most significant transformation of state government in 20 years, merging five agencies into three, saving taxpayers $18.3 million. As a further $2 billion deficit loomed, Gregoire launched a further package of reforms to continue to cut costs. On December 3, 2011, Gregoire announced that the government reform measures saved businesses more than $450 million in unemployment taxes and workers’ compensation rates.

==== Great Recession ====
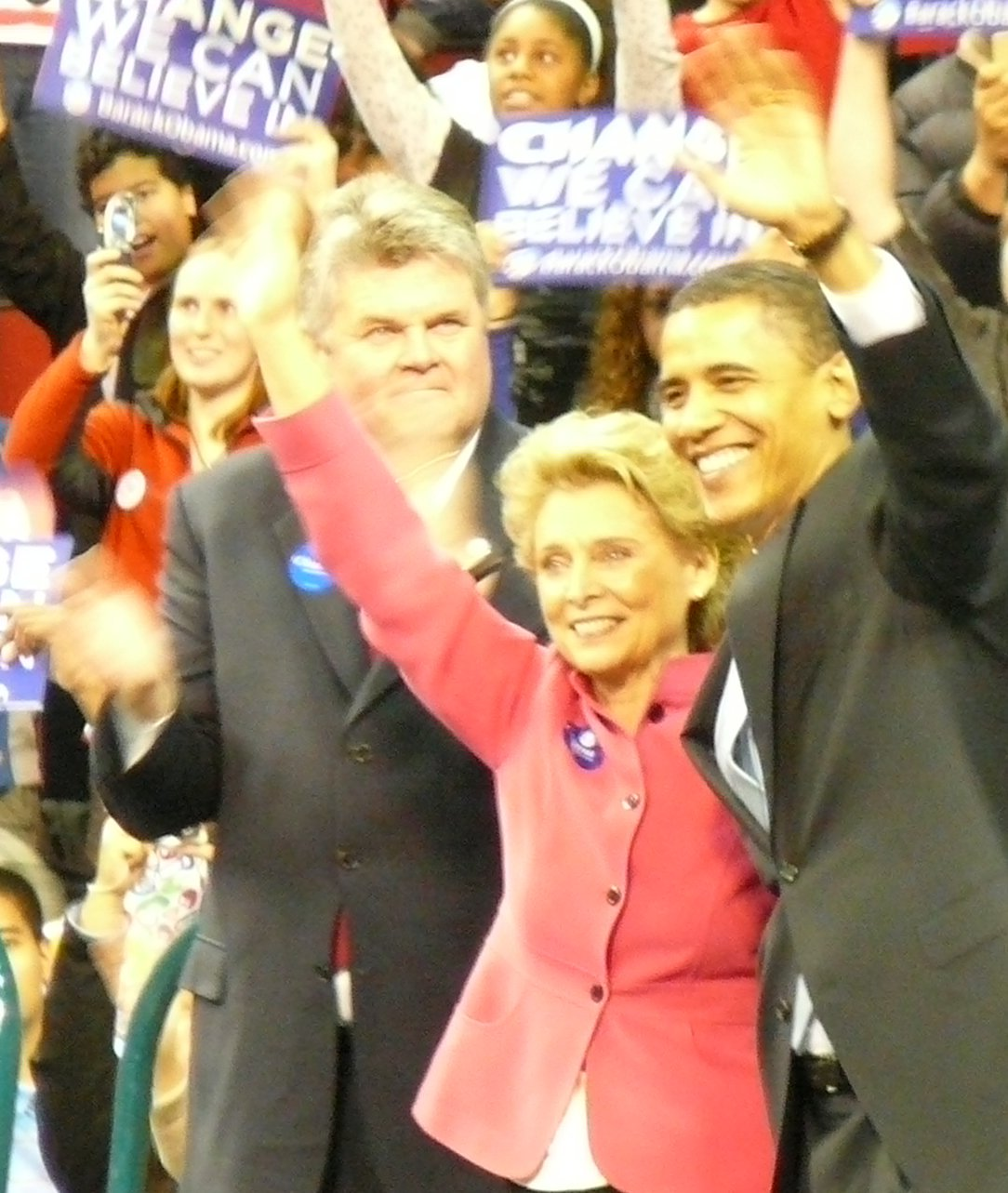
Gregoire (center), stands with Seattle Mayor Greg Nickels (left) and U.S. Senator from Illinois Barack Obama (right) at a rally for Obama's presidential campaign at KeyArena on February 8, 2008.

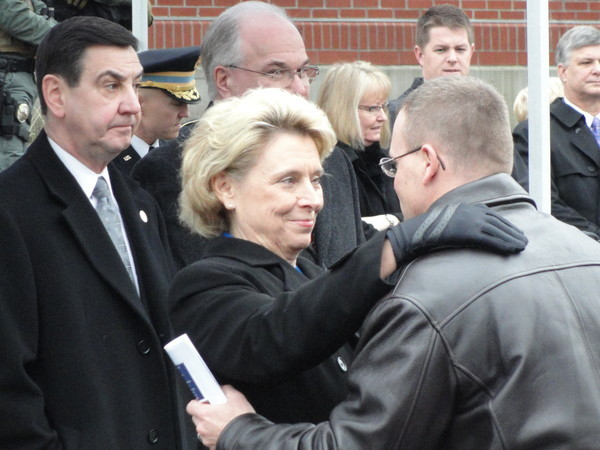
Gregoire in 2010 at a memorial dedication for the victims of the 2009 Lakewood police officer shooting.

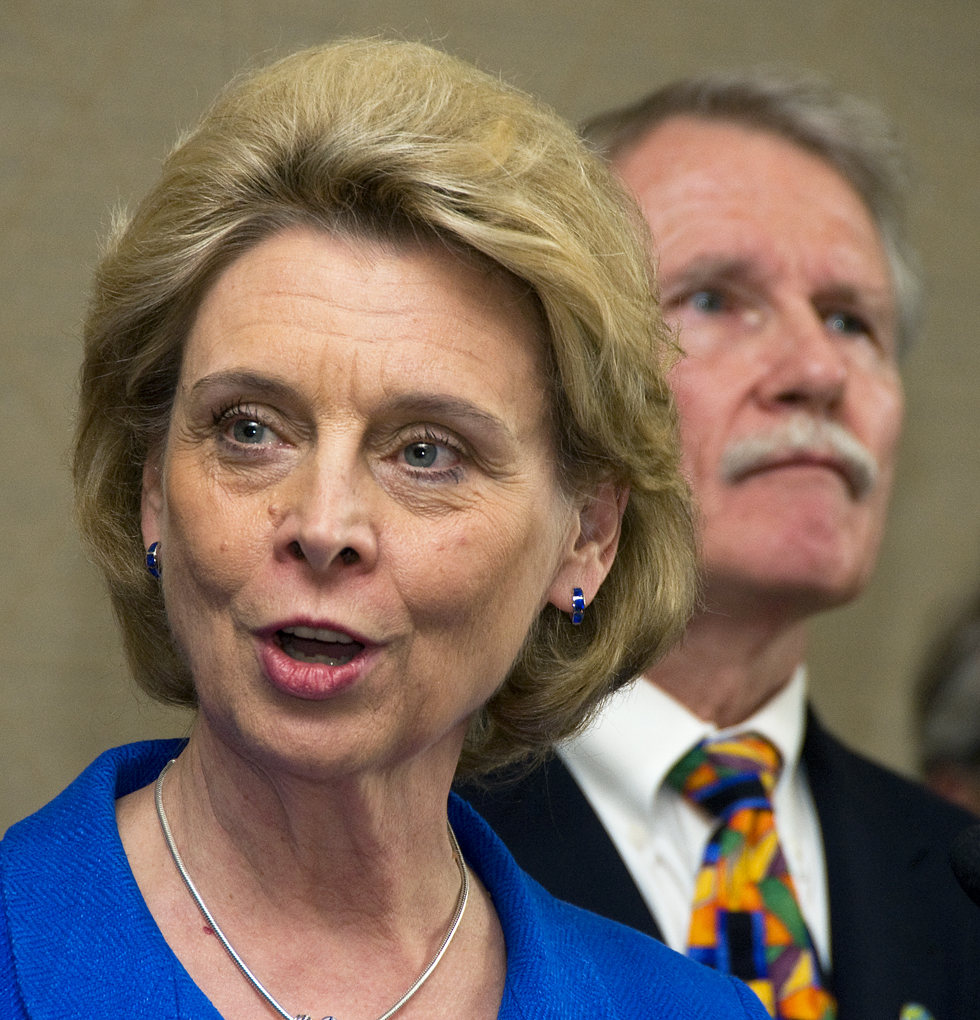
Governor Gregoire and Oregon Governor John Kitzhaber announce the Columbia River Crossing plan in 2011.

As the Great Recession began to impact states across the U.S., Gregoire announced the "Washington Jobs Now" package to provide economic stimulus and job creation. As the economic slowdown put Washingtonians out of work, she increased unemployment benefits and supported the Federal Recovery Act efforts by identifying shovel-ready projects to put people to work and make investments in communities and infrastructure. As signs of the Great Recession worsened, Gregoire announced additional measures to reform state government. As part of her 21st Century Government Reform Initiative she set out to streamline government, eliminate 17 boards and commissions, and reduce another 78. She also introduced legislation to reduce or eliminate a third of 64 small Cabinet agencies through mergers or realignments. Additionally, she signed a budget anticipating a potential $9 billion shortfall and reduced spending.

In January 2010, Gregoire released a 10-point plan to accelerate recovery and create as many as 40,000 jobs over the next three years. As the most trade dependent state in the nation, and as a way to more quickly emerge from the Great Recession, Gregoire also announced the Washington Export Initiative to expand the state's export opportunities and create jobs. As the Great Recession deepened, Gregoire announced plans to cut costs and streamline government by reducing state agencies from 21 to nine, saving $30 million. She also reached an agreement with state unions to reduce state employees’ pay by 3%.

To continue to help spur economic recovery, Gregoire emphasized small businesses as job creators and eased administrative burdens for them and local governments by Executive Order. As part of a significant and unprecedented overhaul of Workers’ Compensation reforms, she passed a bill to save $200 million over four years and increase outcomes for workers and employers. To emphasize Washington's role in global trade, Gregoire led a delegation of automotive, life-science, aerospace and education leaders to Europe on her sixth trade mission. She also led a trade mission to China and Japan.

== Post-gubernatorial career ==
Gregoire's term ended in January 2013 and her official portrait was painted by artist Michele Rushworth.

Gregoire was reportedly considered by the Obama administration for a position in either the State Department or the Department of the Interior, but was not chosen.

After leaving office, Gregoire became a public speaker, notably speaking with former Oregon governor Ted Kulongoski at the Emerging Local Government Leaders in October 2013.

On July 1, Gregoire began a term as a board member for the Fred Hutchinson Cancer Research Center. Larry Corey, an M.D. and the director of the Hutchinson Center commented, "As governor, Chris Gregoire was a visionary leader and advocate of biomedical research. Under her watch she proposed a major initiative in the life sciences. Gregoire will be instrumental in helping to shine a spotlight on the lifesaving work of the Hutchinson Center and how it contributes to the health and well-being of people throughout the state and the world."

From August to December 2014, Gregoire took a position as a Fall Fellow at the Harvard Institute of Politics at the Harvard Kennedy School in Harvard Square, where she spent time engaging with students at the school about leadership in various positions of government.

=== Challenge Seattle ===
After taking time away from public life following her governorship, Gregoire coordinated with several business and community leaders to found Challenge Seattle, an alliance of CEOs from 18 of the region's largest employers. Launched in 2015, Challenge Seattle, with Gregoire as its CEO, focuses on improving the Cascadia Innovation Corridor, education, middle-income housing affordability, and transportation projects.

== Personal life ==
Gregoire's first child, Courtney, was born in Spokane in 1979. In 2013, Courtney was appointed to the Seattle Port Commission. Courtney has two children, Audrey and Alexa. Her second daughter, Michelle, was born in 1984. When not in Olympia, Gregoire lives in nearby Lacey with her husband, Michael.

In 2003, she was diagnosed with breast cancer in an early stage after a routine check-up and a mammogram. She had surgery and recovered. She mentions her fight with cancer in speeches about health care.

== Awards ==
In 2007, Gregoire was named one of Governing magazines “Public Officials of the Year”

In 2009, Gregoire received a sort of tongue-in-cheek Fuse "Fizzle" Award. The awards program is aimed at promoting leadership and accountability in the Washington State Legislature.

In 1995, Gregoire received the honorary degree of LL.D. from Gonzaga University. In 2012, she was awarded an honorary Doctor of Laws after delivering the commencement speech at Washington State University. In 2015, she received an honorary Doctor of Laws from the University of Washington.

== Electoral history ==
Washington Attorney General Election 1992
Party	Candidate	Votes	%	±%
Democratic	Christine Gregoire	1,190,784	54.88	
Republican	Norm Maleng	946,946	43.64	
Populist	Homer L. Brand	32,124	1.48	

Washington Attorney General Election 1996
Party	Candidate	Votes	%	±%
Democratic	Christine Gregoire	1,280,955	60.04	
Republican	Richard Pope	756,639	35.46	
Libertarian	Richard Shepard	58,673	2.75	

Washington Attorney General Election 2000
Party	Candidate	Votes	%	±%
Democratic	Christine Gregoire	1,292,887	55.98	
Republican	Richard Pope	883,002	38.23	
Libertarian	Richard Shepard	90,941	3.94	

Washington Gubernatorial Election 2004
Party	Candidate	Votes	%	±%
Democratic	Christine Gregoire	1,373,361	48.8730	
Republican	Dino Rossi	1,373,228	48.8683	
Libertarian	Ruth Bennett	63,465	2.2585	

2008 Washington gubernatorial election
Party	Candidate	Votes	%	±%
Democratic	Christine Gregoire	1,598,738	53.24	+4.37
Republican	Dino Rossi	1,404,124	46.76	−2.11

== See also ==
- List of female state attorneys general in the United States
- List of female governors in the United States

Legal offices
Preceded by Ken Eikenberry	Attorney General of Washington; 1993–2005	Succeeded by Rob McKenna
Party political offices
Preceded by Gary Locke	Democratic nominee for Governor of Washington; 2004, 2008	Succeeded by Jay Inslee
Political offices
Preceded by Gary Locke	Governor of Washington; 2005–2013	Succeeded by Jay Inslee
Preceded by Joe Manchin	Chair of National Governors Association; 2010–2011	Succeeded by Dave Heineman
U.S. order of precedence (ceremonial)
Preceded by Martha McSally as Former U.S. Senator	Order of precedence of the United States; Within Washington	Succeeded by Jay Inslee as Former Governor
Preceded by Steve Bullock as Former Governor	Order of precedence of the United States; Outside Washington	Succeeded by Jay Inslee as Former Governor
