= Uncle Mover =

American perennial candidate and business owner

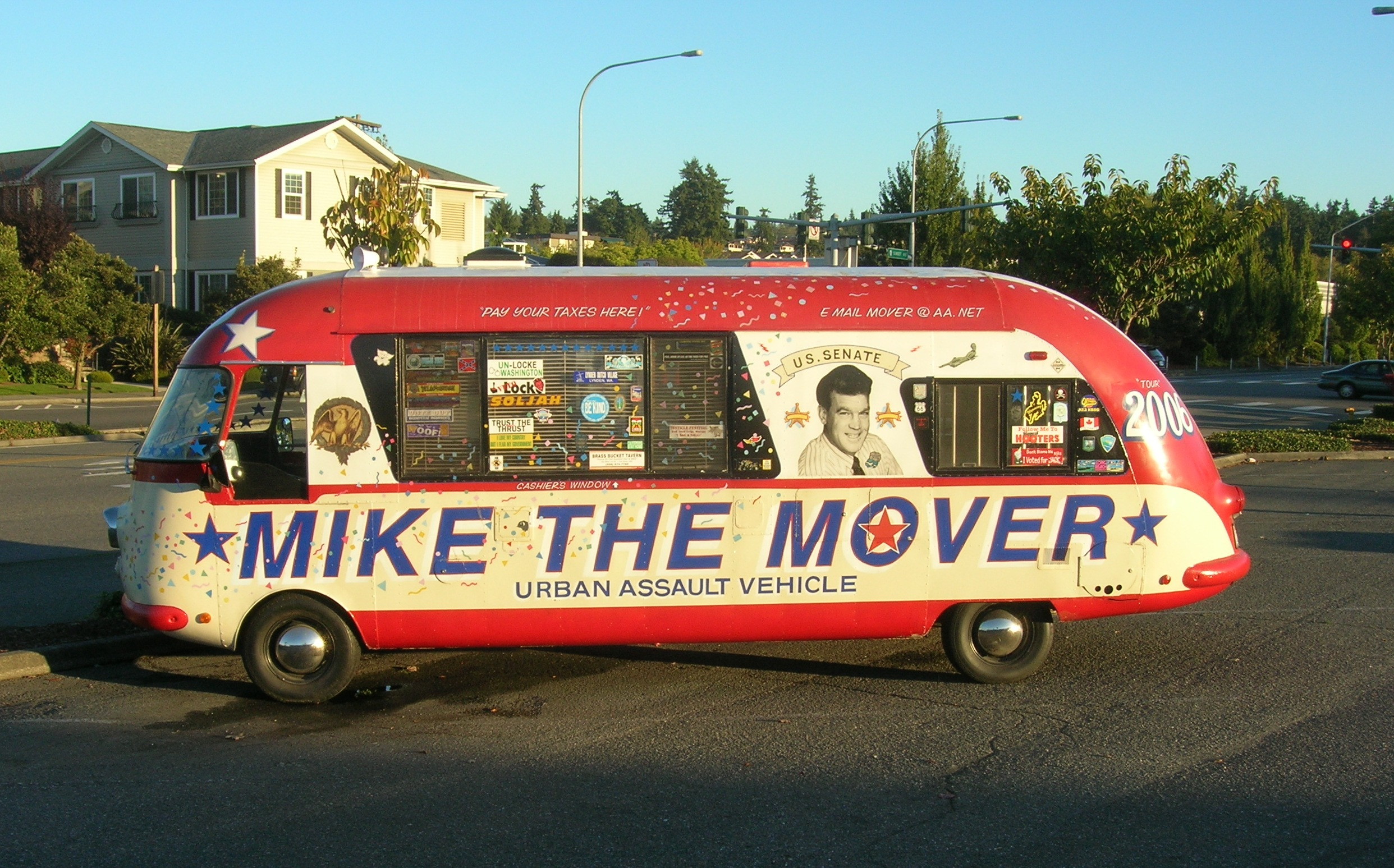
- Uncle Mover's RV in 2006, when he was known as "Mike the Mover"
- Born: Michael Patrick Shanks; March 17, 1953 (age 73); United States
- Other name: Mike the Mover (formerly)
- Occupation: Businessman
- Political party: Independent
- Other political affiliations: Democratic; Republican; National Union Party; Moderate GOP Party

Uncle Mover (born Michael Patrick Shanks, March 17, 1953), formerly known as Mike the Mover, is an American perennial candidate and business owner from Washington State. In 1990, Shanks legally changed his name to Mike the Mover to help promote his furniture moving business.

== Politics ==
According to Mover, he has run for public office more than 17 times, but has never been elected.

Uncle Mover's face on his campaign bus in 2006

Originally motivated to run for office to draw attention to Washington's complex regulations for movers, Mover's more recent campaigns have been a marketing tactic to promote his business. In 2004, he estimated $150,000 (~$238,042 in 2024) of his company's annual revenue came from the name-familiarity generated by his ballot appearances.

Never endorsed by a political party, he has sought office as a Democrat and a Republican. In the 2014 election for U.S. Congress from Washington's 1st congressional district, Mover, a Civil War enthusiast, ran as a candidate of the "National Union Party". Under Washington elections law, candidates can declare themselves a member of any party, whether the party exists or not. Changing his name again to Uncle Mover, Mover filed to run for U.S. Senate in 2016.

== Personal life ==
Uncle Mover grew up as one of twelve children born to Richard and Patricia Shanks. His father was the former Mayor of Lake City, prior to it becoming incorporated into Seattle in the 1950s.

Mover resides in Snohomish County near Lynnwood, Washington.

In 1977, Mover started moving professionally. Unable to receive a state permit, he was charged 89 times with gross misdemeanors and was convicted of in two of these cases for operating an illegal moving business.

== See also ==
- Goodspaceguy
- Stan Lippmann
- Richard Pope
