= Administrative error =

Type of survey error

Administrative error is an error resulting from improper administration or execution of a survey. Such errors can be caused by carelessness, confusion, neglect, omission or another blunder.

== Types ==
There are 4 types of administrative errors:

1. Data-processing error: A category of administrative error that occurs in data processing because of incorrect data entry, incorrect computer programming or other error during data analysis.
2. Sample selection error: Selection bias: an administrative error caused by improper selection of a sample during a survey, resulting in accidental bias in the results.
3. Interviewer error: This type of administrative error is caused by failure of an interviewer to correctly pose questions or record responses. Interviewer error generally leads to biased results, and perhaps to an increase in variability.
4. Interviewer cheating: The practice of filling in fake answers or falsifying questionnaires while working as an interviewer.
