= Stan Lippmann =

American disbarred lawyer, perennial candidate

Stanley Irving Lippmann is a disbarred lawyer, anti-vaccination activist and a perennial candidate from the U.S. state of Washington.

== Early life and education ==
Lippmann was born in Brooklyn, New York and received his undergraduate degree in physics from New York University. In 1995 he moved to Seattle from his then home in California to attend law school, taking a JD from the University of Washington School of Law in 1998.

== Political campaigns ==
Lippmann has unsuccessfully run for public office more than a dozen times, standing for election for Mayor of Seattle, Seattle City Council, U.S. House of Representatives, Attorney General of Washington, Board Member of the Seattle Monorail Project, King County Executive, Mayor of Lake Forest Park, Washington, the Washington House of Representatives, and the Washington State Supreme Court. As Lippmann was disbarred from the practice of law in 2008, a Thurston County judge ruled that he was ineligible to stand for election to this office and ordered his name struck off the ballot, along with that of another disbarred lawyer.

== Controversies ==
=== Anti-vaccinationism ===
While in law school, Lippmann wrote a lengthy paper railing against mandatory vaccinations. When running for King County Executive in 2009, he called the 2009 swine flu pandemic a "hoax" intended to "move more Tamiflu off the shelf."

=== Disbarment ===
On October 24, 2008, Lippmann was disbarred from the practice of law for numerous financial improprieties including, among others, theft of client funds, charging excessive fees, and improperly taking loans from clients.

=== Miscellaneous ===
A disbarred attorney, Lippmann has occasionally made headlines for reasons unrelated to his frequent political campaigns. The month following the September 11 terrorist attacks, Lippmann attended a "flag-waving rally" organized by Seattle conservative talk radio station KVI-AM carrying a sign showing the head of George W. Bush superimposed on the body of Adolf Hitler. According to Lippmann, he wanted to "shock the brainwashed crowd". Despite being protected by eight Seattle police officers, Lippmann was still assaulted by a passerby.

== See also ==
- Richard Pope
- Mike the Mover
- Goodspaceguy
- Anti-vaccinationism
