= 2018 United States Senate election in Washington =

- November 6, 2018
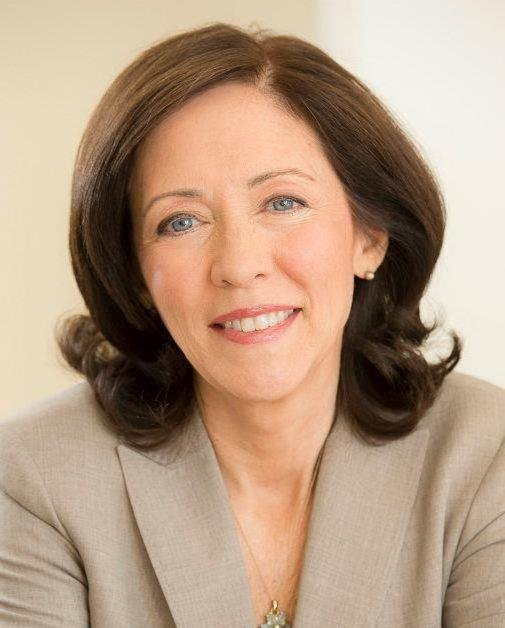

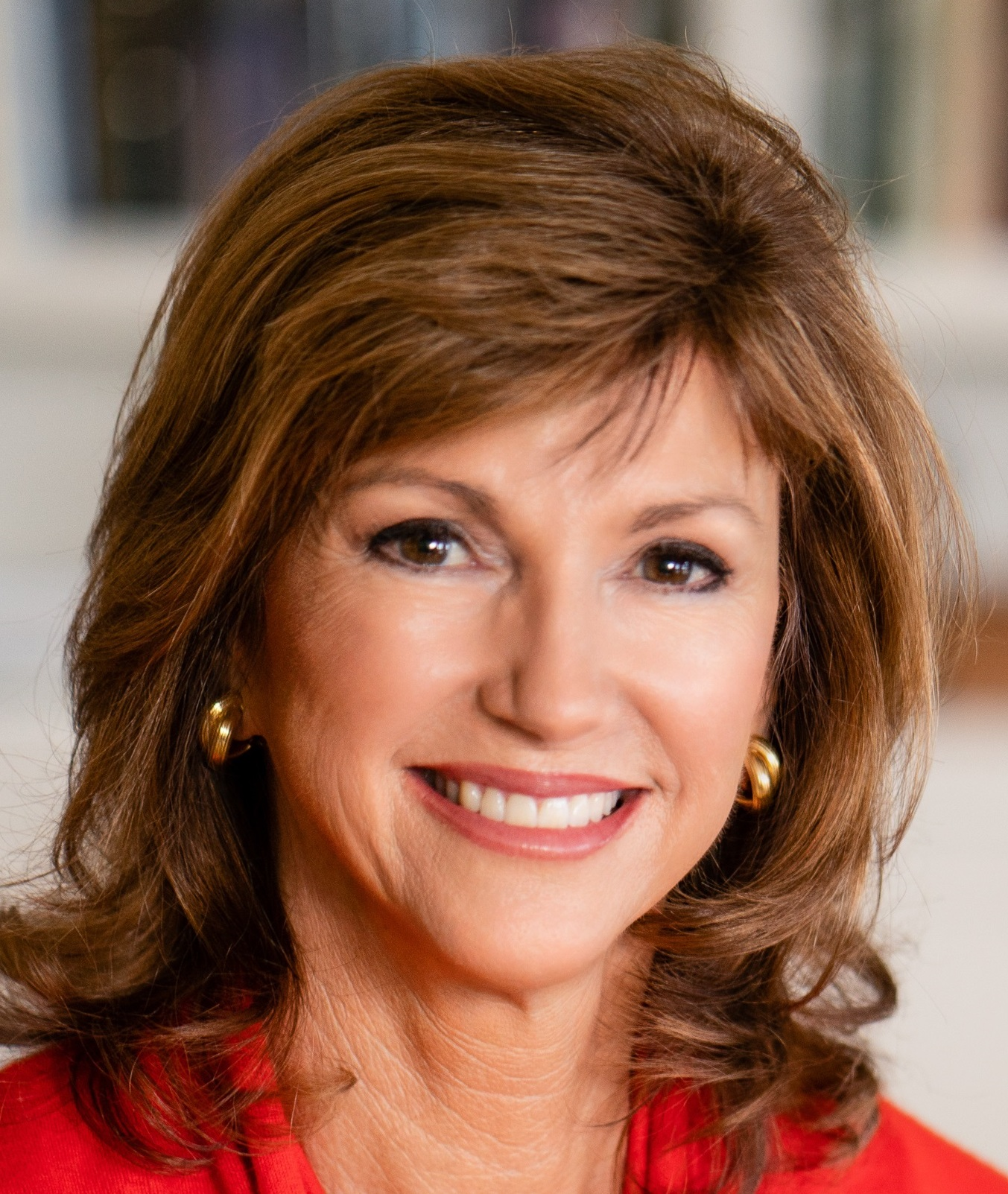
Nominee	Maria Cantwell	Susan Hutchison
Party	Democratic	Republican
Popular vote	1,803,364	1,282,804
Percentage	58.43%	41.57%
- Cantwell: 50–60% 60–70% 70–80% 80–90% >90% Hutchison: 50–60% 60–70% 70–80% 80–90% >90% Tie: 50% No votes
U.S. senator before election
Maria Cantwell
Democratic
Elected U.S. Senator
Maria Cantwell
Democratic

The 2018 United States Senate election in Washington took place on November 6, 2018, to elect a member of the United States Senate to represent the State of Washington. Incumbent Democrat Maria Cantwell won election to a fourth term over television news journalist Susan Hutchison, a Republican.

== Nonpartisan blanket primary ==
=== Candidates ===
The primary election featured 30 candidates.

==== Democratic Party ====
===== Declared =====
- Maria Cantwell, incumbent senator
- George H. Kalberer
- Don L. Rivers
- Mohammad Said
- Clint Tannehill

==== Republican Party ====
===== Declared =====
- Dave Bryant
- Art Coday
- Rocky De La Fuente, businessman and former presidential candidate
- Joey Gibson, activist and founder of Patriot Prayer
- Goodspaceguy, perennial candidate
- Matt Hawkins
- Matthew D. Heines
- Susan Hutchison, former chair of the Washington State Republican Party
- John Orlinski
- Tim Owen
- RC Smith
- Glen Stockwell
- Keith Swank

===== Withdrawn =====
- Ron Higgins (withdrew May 19, 2018)

===== Endorsements =====
Susan Hutchison (R)

Organizations

- Hunters Heritage Council
- Washington Farm Bureau

==== Independents ====
===== Declared =====
- Thor Amundson
- Jon Butler
- Jennifer "GiGi" Ferguson
- Charlie R. Jackson
- Dave Strider

===== Write-in =====
- Clay Johnson, activist

==== Minor parties ====
In Washington, primary candidates may declare a preference for any party, and their party preference does not imply that the candidate is nominated or endorsed by the party. Candidates may also declare a preference for new or single-candidate parties.

===== Declared =====
- Brad Chase (FDFR Party (Note: According to Chase, FDFR stands for "Fuck Democrats Fuck Republicans".)), communications strategist
- James Robert "Jimmie" Deal (Green Party)
- Steve Hoffman (Freedom Socialist Party), union organizer
- Mike Luke (Libertarian Party)
- Alex Tsimerman (StandupAmerica)
- Sam Wright (The Human Rights Party)

=== Results ===
Results by county Cantwell: 30–40%; 40–50%; 50–60%; 60–70%; Hutchison: 30–40%; 40–50%

Blanket primary election results
Party	Candidate	Votes	%
Democratic	Maria Cantwell (incumbent)	929,961	54.68%
Republican	Susan Hutchison	413,317	24.30%
Republican	Keith Swank	39,818	2.34%
Republican	Joey Gibson	38,676	2.27%
Democratic	Clint Tannehill	35,770	2.10%
Republican	Dave Bryant	33,962	2.00%
Republican	Art Coday	30,654	1.80%
Independent	Jennifer Gigi Ferguson	25,224	1.48%
Republican	Tim Owen	23,167	1.36%
Republican	Matt Hawkins	13,324	0.78%
Democratic	Don L. Rivers	12,634	0.74%
Libertarian	Mike Luke	12,302	0.72%
Republican	Glen R. Stockwell	11,611	0.68%
Independent	Thor Amundson	9,393	0.55%
Democratic	Mohammad Said	8,649	0.51%
Republican	Matthew D. Heines	7,737	0.45%
Freedom Socialist	Steve Hoffman	7,390	0.43%
Republican	GoodSpaceGuy	7,057	0.41%
Republican	John Orlinski	6,905	0.41%
Independent	Dave Strider	6,821	0.40%
Republican	Roque "Rocky" De La Fuente	5,724	0.34%
Green	James Robert "Jimmie" Deal	3,849	0.23%
The Human Rights Party	Sam Wright	3,761	0.22%
FDFR Party	Brad Chase	2,655	0.16%
Democratic	George H. Kalberer	2,448	0.14%
Independent	Charlie R. Jackson	2,411	0.14%
Republican	R. C. Smith	2,238	0.13%
Independent	Jon Butler	2,016	0.12%
StandUpAmerica	Alex Tsimerman	1,366	0.08%
Total votes		1,700,840	100.00%

==== Counties that flipped from Republican to Democratic ====
- Klickitat (largest city: Goldendale)
- Spokane (largest city: Spokane)
- Walla Walla (largest city: Walla Walla)
- Whitman (largest city: Pullman)

== General election ==
=== Debates ===
2018 United States Senate election in Washington debates
No.	Date	Host	Moderator	Link	Democratic	Republican
Key: P Participant A Absent N Not invited I Invited W Withdrawn						
Key: P Participant A Absent N Not invited I Invited W Withdrawn					Maria Cantwell	Susan Hutchison
1	Oct. 8, 2018	KOMO-TV; Pacific Lutheran University	Mary Nam; Essex Porter		P	P
2	Oct. 20, 2018	Community Colleges of Spokane; Gonzaga University; Eastern Washington University; University of Washington; Washington State University Spokane; Whitworth University	Hayley Guenthner; Jane McCarthy		P	P

=== Predictions ===
Source	Ranking	As of
The Cook Political Report	Safe D	October 26, 2018
Inside Elections	Safe D	November 1, 2018
Sabato's Crystal Ball	Safe D	November 5, 2018
Fox News	Likely D	July 9, 2018
CNN	Safe D	July 12, 2018
RealClearPolitics	Safe D	November 5, 2018

=== Post-primary endorsements ===
Maria Cantwell (D)

Newspapers

- The Seattle Times

=== Polling ===
View source data.

Poll source	Date(s) administered	Sample size (Note: Key: A – all adults RV – registered voters LV – likely voters V – unclear)	Margin of error	Maria Cantwell (D)	Susan Hutchison (R)	Undecided
Elway/Crosscut	October 4–9, 2018	405 (RV)	± 5.0%	53%	39%	9%
Public Policy Polling (D) (Note: This poll was sponsored by the Northwest Progressive Institute)	May 22–23, 2018	675 (LV)	± 3.8%	52%	36%	12%

Hypothetical polling

Maria Cantwell vs. Rob McKenna

Poll source	Date(s) administered	Sample size	Margin of error	Maria Cantwell (D)	Rob McKenna (R)	Undecided
Public Policy Polling (D)	June 27–28, 2017	887 (LV)	± 3.3%	53%	40%	6%

=== Results ===
2018 United States Senate election in Washington
Party	Candidate	Votes	%	±%
Democratic	Maria Cantwell (incumbent)	1,803,364	58.43%	−2.02%
Republican	Susan Hutchison	1,282,804	41.57%	+2.02%
Total votes		3,086,168	100.00%	N/A
Democratic hold				

==== By county ====
By county

County	Maria Cantwell Democratic		Susan Hutchison Republican		Margin		Total
County	%	#	%	#	%	#	Total
Adams	32.25%	1,365	67.75%	2,867	–35.49%	–1,502	4,232
Asotin	41.82%	3,809	58.18%	5,298	–16.35%	–1,489	9,107
Benton	37.52%	28,187	62.48%	46,938	–24.96%	–18,751	75,125
Chelan	44.06%	14,787	55.94%	18,775	–11.88%	–3,988	33,562
Clallam	50.67%	20,036	49.33%	19,504	1.35%	532	39,540
Clark	52.96%	102,619	47.04%	91,153	5.92%	11,466	193,772
Columbia	33.24%	731	66.76%	1,468	–33.52%	–737	2,199
Cowlitz	46.29%	20,485	53.71%	23,773	–7.43%	–3,288	44,258
Douglas	36.17%	5,390	63.83%	9,512	–27.66%	–4,122	14,902
Ferry	38.10%	1,329	61.90%	2,159	–23.80%	–830	3,488
Franklin	40.26%	8,983	59.74%	13,329	–19.48%	–4,346	22,312
Garfield	33.58%	445	66.42%	880	–32.83%	–435	1,325
Grant	30.80%	8,159	69.20%	18,333	–38.40%	–10,174	26,492
Grays Harbor	47.81%	13,605	52.19%	14,851	–4.38%	–1,246	28,456
Island	53.18%	22,341	46.82%	19,672	6.35%	2,669	42,013
Jefferson	68.79%	14,331	31.21%	6,502	37.58%	7,829	20,833
King	74.15%	708,654	25.85%	247,071	48.30%	461,583	955,725
Kitsap	56.47%	67,847	43.53%	52,308	12.93%	15,539	120,155
Kittitas	43.10%	8,330	56.90%	10,996	–13.79%	–2,666	19,326
Klickitat	45.84%	4,889	54.16%	5,776	–8.32%	–887	10,665
Lewis	32.71%	11,078	67.29%	22,793	–34.59%	–11,715	33,871
Lincoln	28.76%	1,604	71.24%	3,974	–42.49%	–2,370	5,578
Mason	47.84%	13,220	52.16%	14,416	–4.33%	–1,196	27,636
Okanogan	43.44%	7,231	56.56%	9,414	–13.12%	–2,183	16,645
Pacific	50.90%	5,527	49.10%	5,332	1.80%	195	10,859
Pend Oreille	36.13%	2,477	63.87%	4,379	–27.74%	–1,902	6,856
Pierce	53.36%	174,097	46.64%	152,177	6.72%	21,920	326,274
San Juan	72.60%	8,016	27.40%	3,026	45.19%	4,990	11,042
Skagit	51.49%	28,122	48.51%	26,498	2.97%	1,624	54,620
Skamania	47.71%	2,663	52.29%	2,919	–4.59%	–256	5,582
Snohomish	57.39%	184,218	42.61%	136,749	14.79%	47,469	320,967
Spokane	49.23%	112,000	50.77%	115,508	–1.54%	–3,508	227,508
Stevens	32.23%	7,274	67.77%	15,296	–35.54%	–8,022	22,570
Thurston	58.54%	72,677	41.46%	51,472	17.08%	21,205	124,149
Wahkiakum	44.66%	1,082	55.34%	1,341	–10.69%	–259	2,423
Walla Walla	46.35%	11,862	53.65%	13,731	–7.30%	–1,869	25,593
Whatcom	59.77%	65,043	40.23%	43,781	19.54%	21,262	108,824
Whitman	54.35%	9,375	45.65%	7,875	8.70%	1,500	17,250
Yakima	41.85%	29,476	58.15%	40,958	–16.30%	–11,482	70,434
Total	58.43%	1,803,364	41.57%	1,282,804	16.87%	520,560	3,086,168

==== Counties that flipped from Democratic to Republican ====
- Cowlitz (largest city: Longview)
- Grays Harbor (largest city: Aberdeen)
- Klickitat (largest city: Goldendale)
- Mason (largest city: Shelton)
- Skamania (largest city: Carson)
- Yakima (largest city: Yakima)
- Wahkiakum (largest city: Puget Island)

==== Counties that flipped from Republican to Democratic ====
- Whitman (largest city: Pullman)

==== By congressional district ====
Cantwell won seven of ten congressional districts.

District	Cantwell	Hutchison	Representative
1st	57%	43%	Suzan DelBene
2nd	61%	39%	Rick Larsen
3rd	49%	51%	Jaime Herrera Beutler
4th	38%	62%	Dan Newhouse
5th	47%	53%	Cathy McMorris Rodgers
6th	57%	43%	Derek Kilmer
7th	84%	16%	Pramila Jayapal
8th	51%	49%	Kim Schrier
9th	73%	27%	Adam Smith
10th	56%	44%	Denny Heck

== Notes ==
Partisan clients
