= Washington State Democratic Party =

Washington state affiliate of the Democratic Party

- Chairperson: Shasti Conrad
- Founded: 1890
- Headquarters: 615 2nd Ave., Suite 580; Seattle, WA 98104
- National affiliation: Democratic Party
- Colors: Blue
- Washington State Senate: 30 / 49
- Washington House of Representatives: 59 / 98
- U.S. Senate Seats: 2 / 2
- U.S. House Seats: 8 / 10
- Statewide Executive Offices: 9 / 9

Election symbol

Website
- Official website

The Washington State Democratic Party, commonly referred to as the Washington Democrats or the Washington Democratic Party, is the affiliate of the Democratic Party in the U.S. state of Washington. It is currently the dominant party in the state, controlling the majority of Washington's U.S. House seats, both U.S. Senate seats, both houses of the state legislature, and the governorship. Washington Democrats have won every election that has occurred since 1980, resulting in the longest democratic governorship streak in the country.

== Organization ==
=== Washington State Democratic Central Committee (WSDCC) ===
- Chair: Shasti Conrad
- Vice-chair: John Thompson
- Treasurer: David Green
- Secretary: Diane Young

In addition, the State Central Committee has one representative from each of Washington's 10 Congressional Districts, six at-large members, and four DNC members. The final two members are a representative from the Young Democrats of Washington and the President of the Washington Federation of Democratic Women.

=== County party organizations ===
Each of Washington's 39 counties has a county democratic central committee, which operates within that county and sends two delegates (which may not share the same gender identity) to the State Central Committee.

=== Legislative district organizations ===
Each of Washington's 49 legislative districts has a local Democratic party organization, which operates within that district and sends two delegates (which may not share the same gender identity) to the State Central Committee.

=== Other state organizations ===
Washington state has organizations such as the High School Democrats of Washington, the College Democrats of Washington, Washington State Stonewall Democrats, and the Young Democrats of Washington; these organisations are separate from the State Central Committee.

== Current elected officials ==
The following popularly-elected offices are held by Democrats:

=== U.S. Senate ===
Since 2001, Democrats have controlled both of Washington's seats in the Senate:

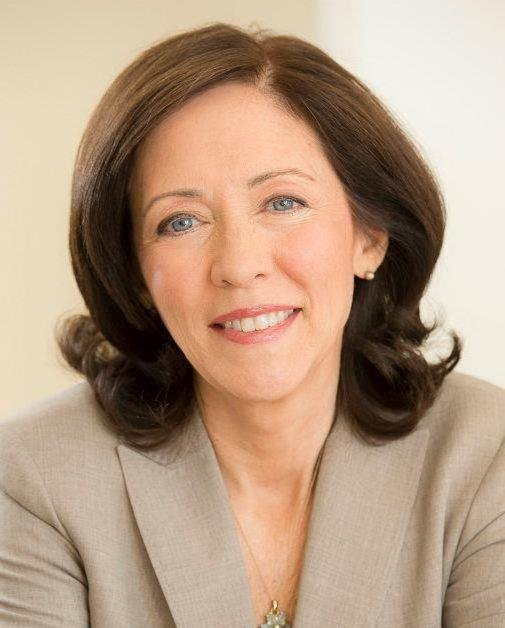
Junior U.S. Senator Maria Cantwell

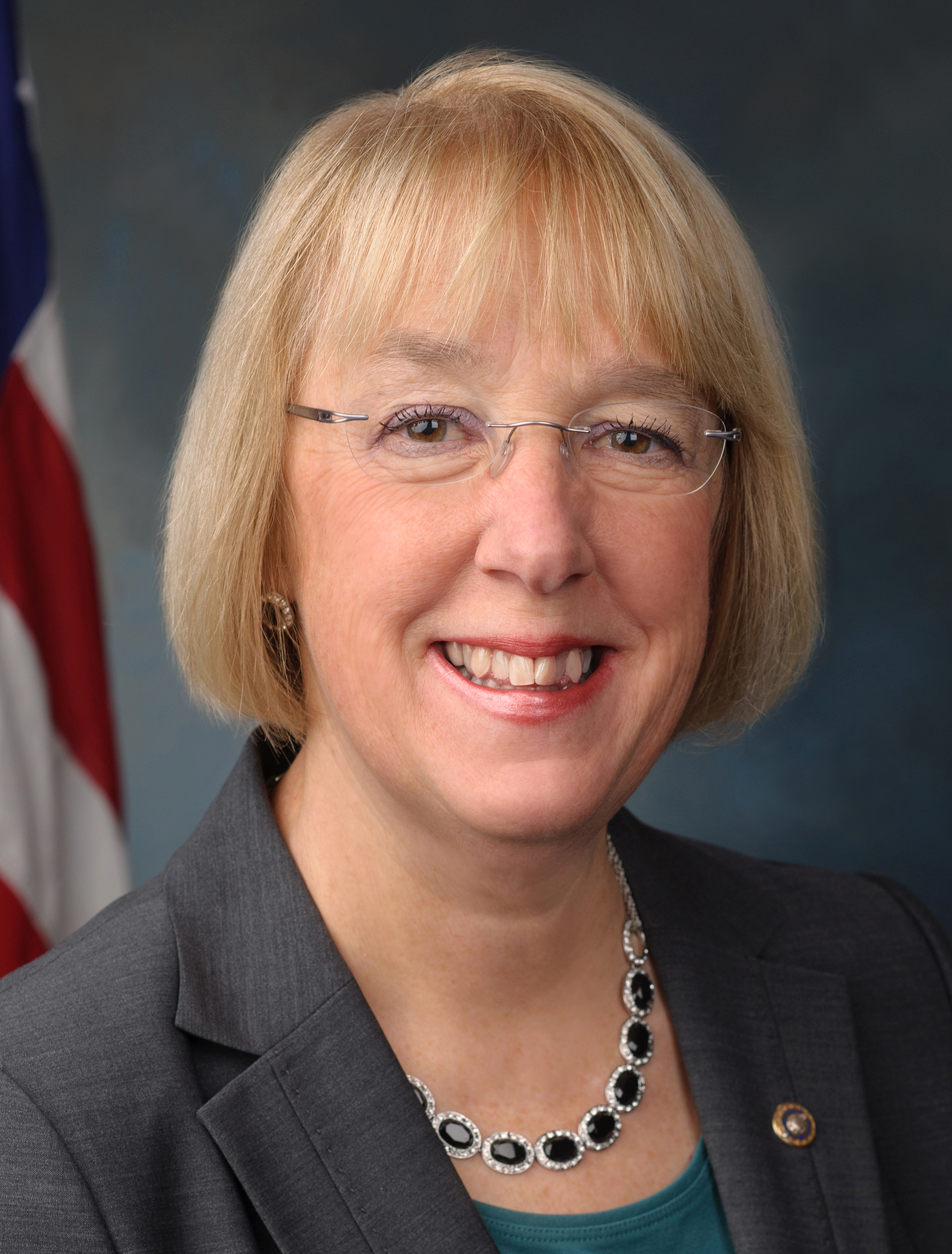
Senior U.S. Senator Patty Murray

=== U.S. House of Representatives ===
Democrats control a majority; they hold eight of the state's ten seats in the House following the 2020 census:

Washington Democrats in House of Representatives
District	Member	Photo
1st	Suzan DelBene	
2nd	Rick Larsen	
3rd	Marie Gluesenkamp Perez	
6th	Emily Randall	
7th	Pramila Jayapal	
8th	Kim Schrier	
9th	Adam Smith	
10th	Marilyn Strickland	

=== Statewide officeholders ===
Democrats hold all nine of Washington's constitutional offices. (Note: The Washington State Office of Superintendent of Public Instruction is officially nonpartisan, but Superintendent Reykdal identifies with the Democratic Party.)

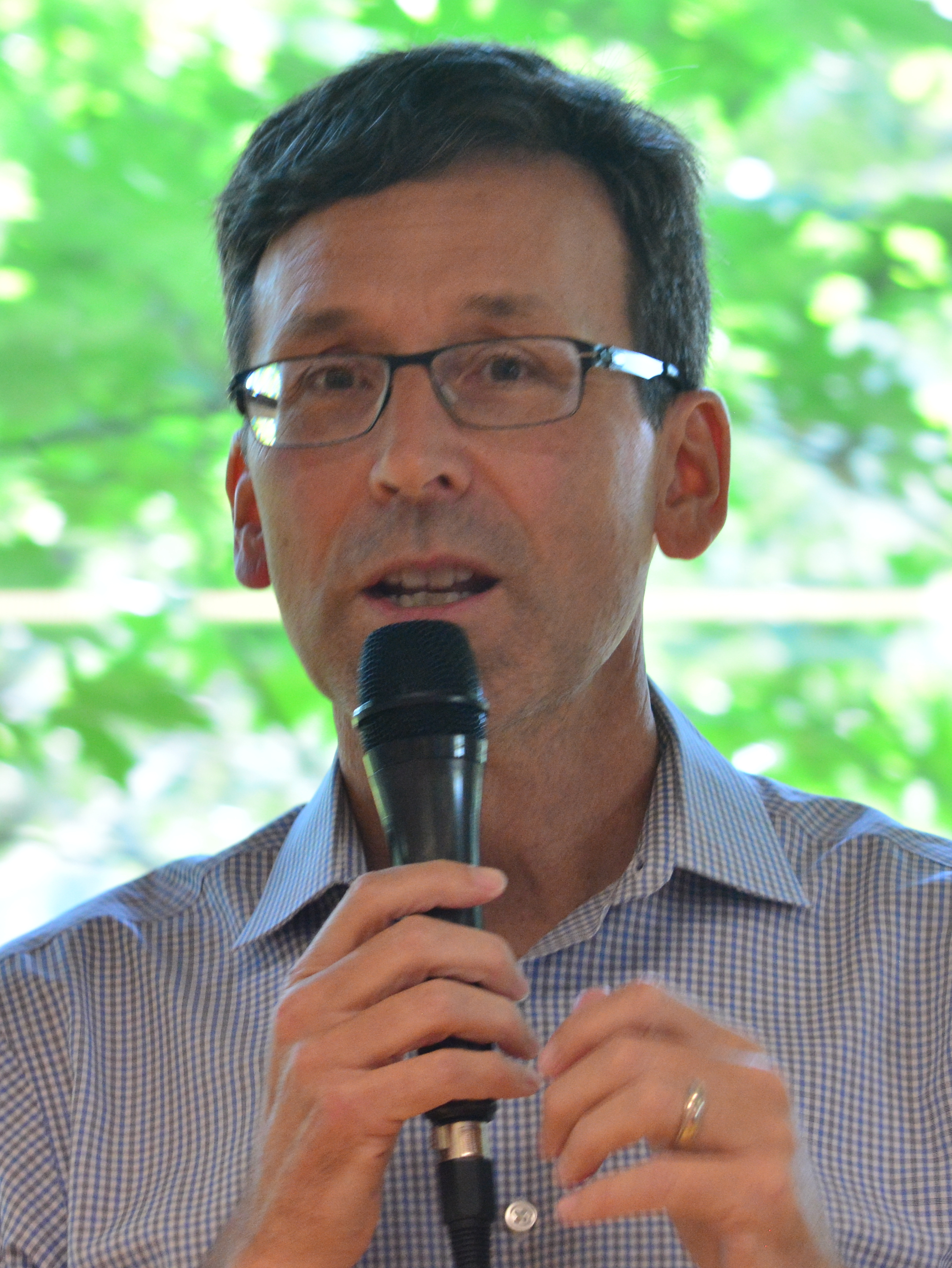
Governor Bob Ferguson

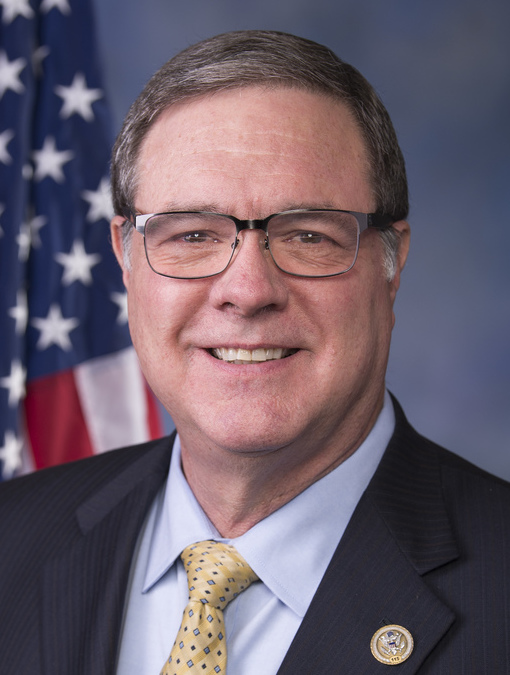
Lieutenant Governor Denny Heck

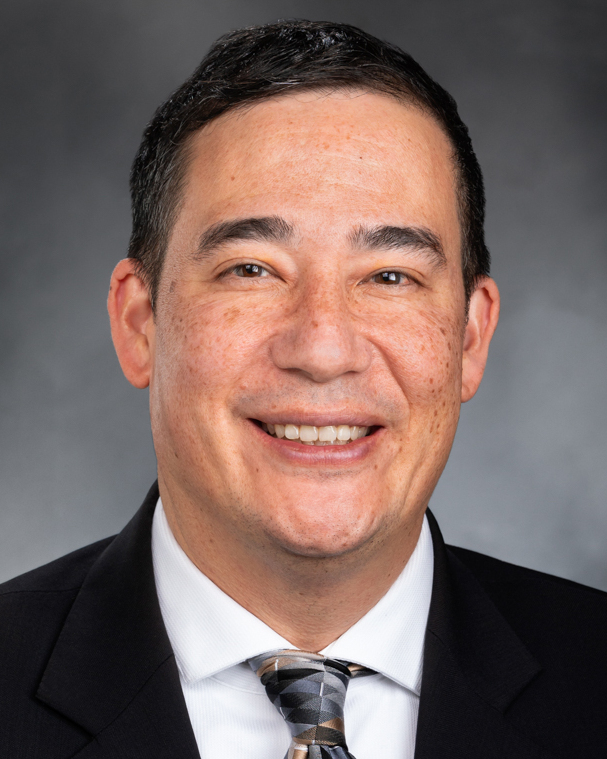
Secretary of State Steve Hobbs

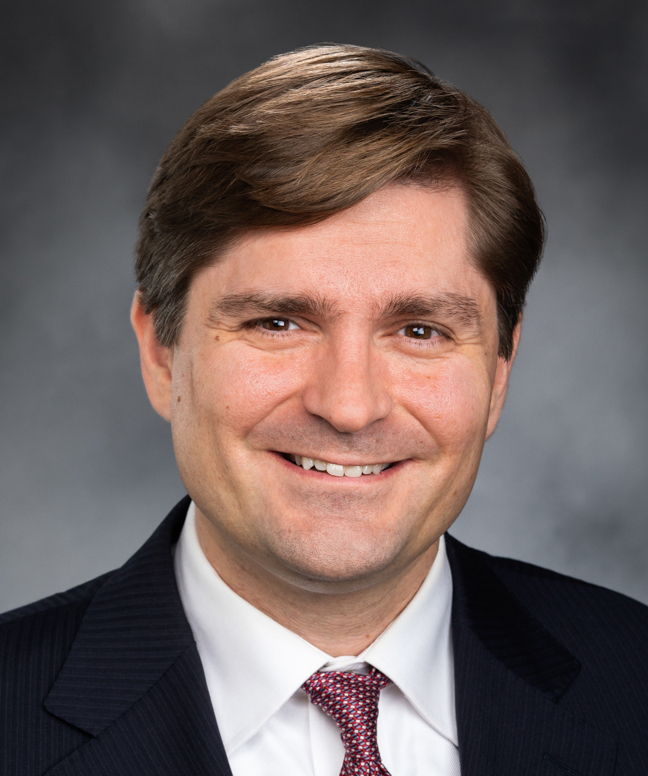
Treasurer Mike Pellicciotti

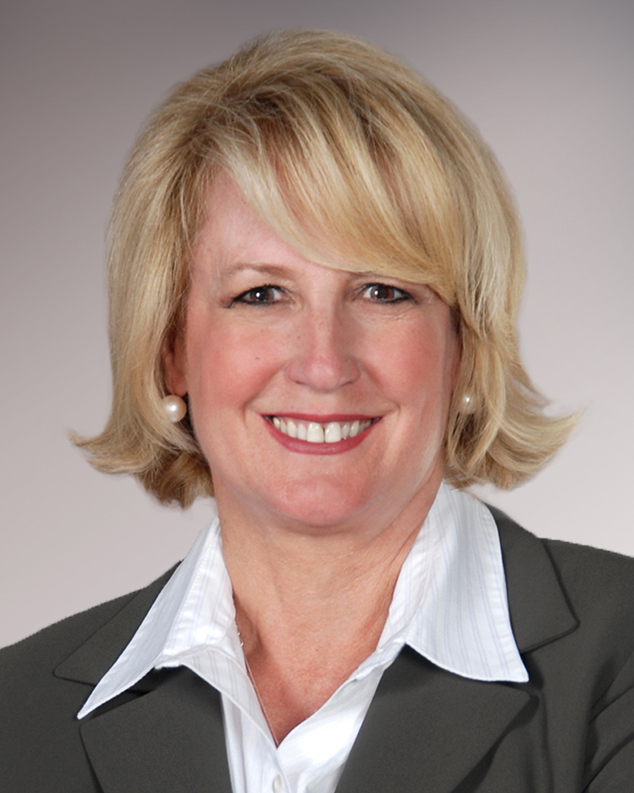
Auditor Pat McCarthy

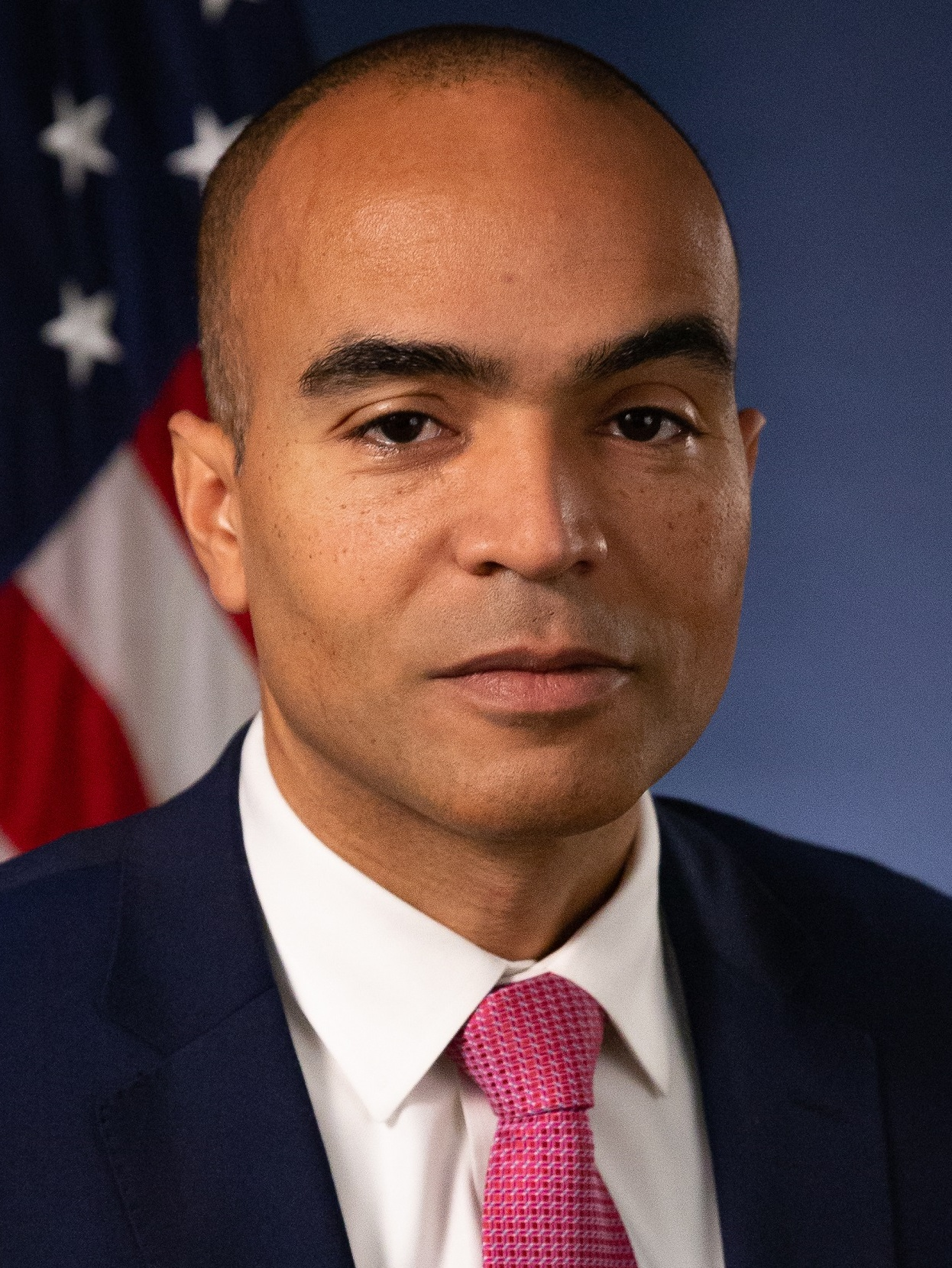
Attorney General Nicholas W. Brown

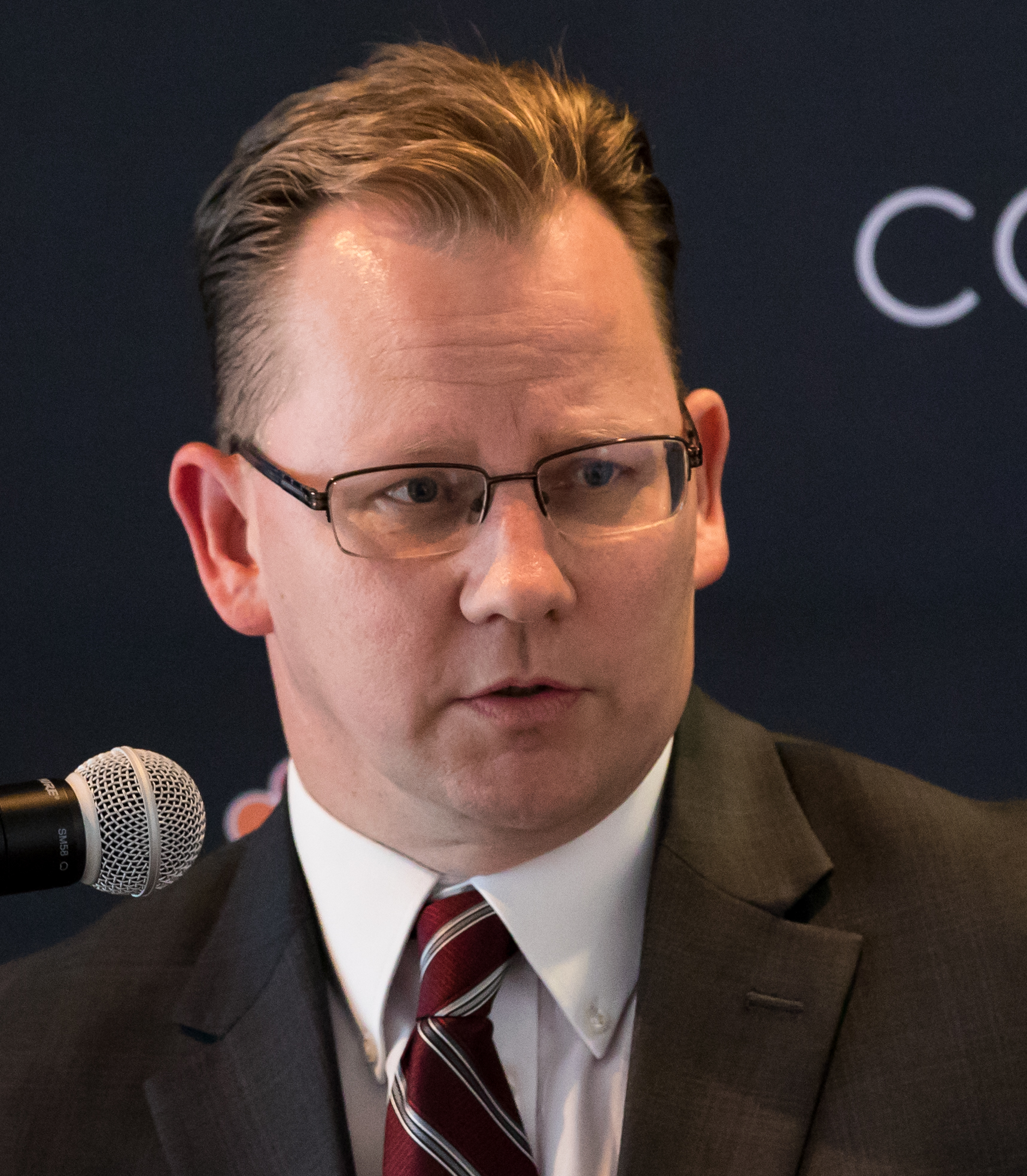
Superintendent of Public Instruction Chris Reykdal

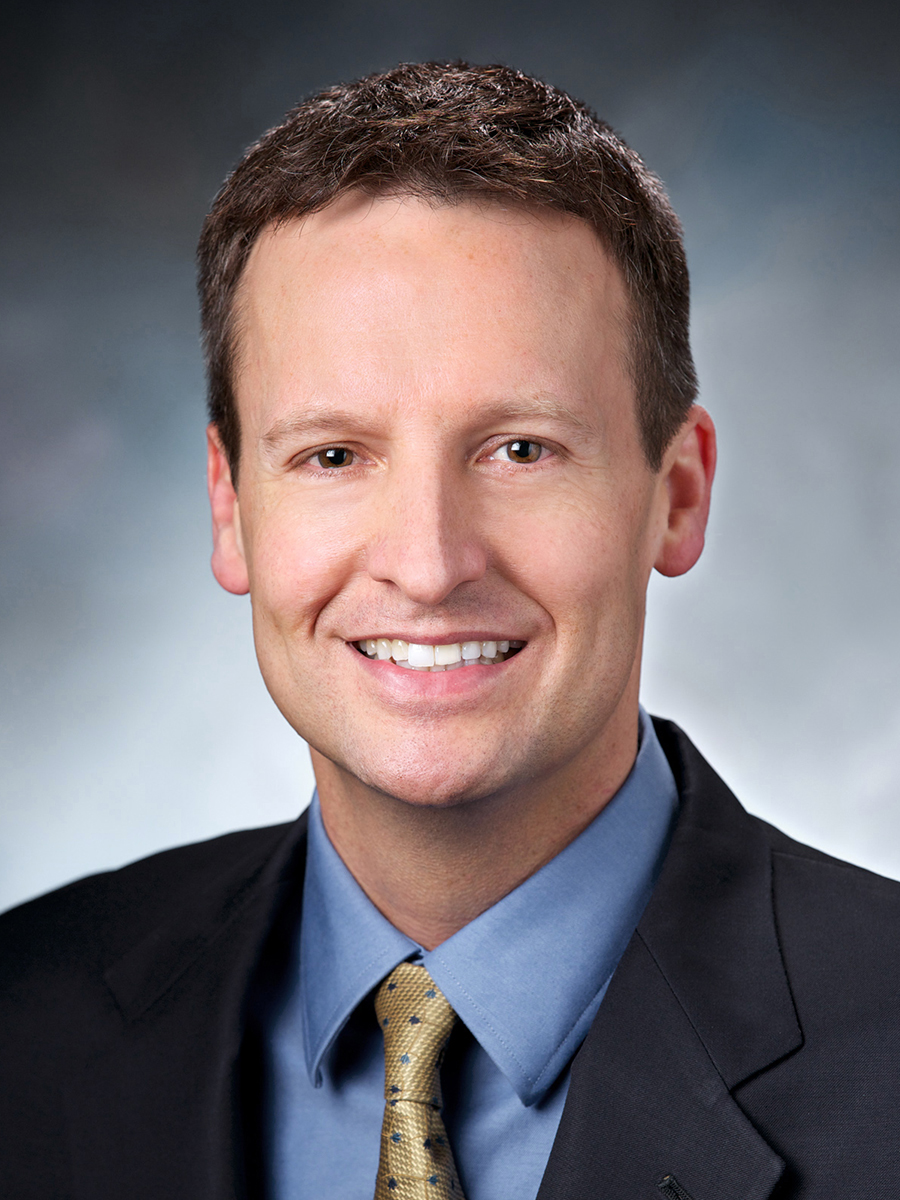
Commissioner of Public Lands Dave Upthegrove

Insurance Commissioner Patty Kuderer

=== Legislative leadership ===
- Senate majority leader: Jamie Pedersen (43rd LD - Seattle)
- Senate president pro tempore: Steve Conway (29th LD - Tacoma)
- Speaker of the House: Laurie Jinkins (27th LD Pos. 1 - Tacoma)
- Speaker pro tempore of the House: Chris Stearns (47th LD Pos. 2 - Auburn)
- House majority leader: Joe Fitzgibbon (34th LD Pos. 2 - Seattle)

=== County Executives ===
- King County: Girmay Zahilay
- Pierce County: Ryan Mello
- Snohomish County: Dave Somers

=== Mayors ===
- Seattle: Katie Wilson
- Spokane: Lisa Brown
- Tacoma: Anders Ibsen

== Election results ==
=== Federal ===
==== Presidential ====
Washington Democratic Party presidential election results
Election	Presidential Ticket	Votes	Vote %	Electoral votes	Result
1892	Grover Cleveland/Adlai E. Stevenson	29,802	33.88%	0 / 4	Won
1896	William Jennings Bryan/Arthur Sewall	53,314	56.97%	4 / 4	Lost
1900	William Jennings Bryan/Adlai E. Stevenson	44,833	41.70%	0 / 4	Lost
1904	Alton B. Parker/Henry G. Davis	28,098	19.36%	0 / 5	Lost
1908	William Jennings Bryan/John W. Kern	58,691	31.92%	0 / 5	Lost
1912	Woodrow Wilson/Thomas R. Marshall	86,840	26.90%	0 / 7	Won
1916	Woodrow Wilson/Thomas R. Marshall	183,388	48.13%	7 / 7	Won
1920	James M. Cox/Franklin D. Roosevelt	84,298	21.14%	0 / 7	Lost
1924	John W. Davis/Charles W. Bryan	42,842	10.16%	0 / 7	Lost
1928	Al Smith/Joseph T. Robinson	156,772	31.30%	0 / 7	Lost
1932	Franklin D. Roosevelt/John N. Garner	353,260	57.46%	8 / 8	Won
1936	Franklin D. Roosevelt/John N. Garner	459,579	66.38%	8 / 8	Won
1940	Franklin D. Roosevelt/Henry A. Wallace	462,145	58.22%	8 / 8	Won
1944	Franklin D. Roosevelt/Harry S. Truman	486,774	56.84%	8 / 8	Won
1948	Harry S. Truman/Alben W. Barkley	476,165	52.61%	8 / 8	Won
1952	Adlai Stevenson/John Sparkman	492,845	45.69%	0 / 9	Lost
1956	Adlai Stevenson/Estes Kefauver	523,002	45.44%	0 / 9	Lost
1960	John F. Kennedy/Lyndon B. Johnson	599,298	48.27%	0 / 9	Won
1964	Lyndon B. Johnson/Hubert Humphrey	779,881	61.97%	9 / 9	Won
1968	Hubert Humphrey/Edmund Muskie	616,037	47.23%	9 / 9	Lost
1972	George McGovern/Sargent Shriver	568,334	38.64%	0 / 9	Lost
1976	Jimmy Carter/Walter Mondale	717,323	46.11%	0 / 9	Won
1980	Jimmy Carter/Walter Mondale	650,193	37.32%	0 / 9	Lost
1984	Walter Mondale/Geraldine Ferraro	807,352	42.86%	0 / 10	Lost
1988	Michael Dukakis/Lloyd Bentsen	933,516	50.05%	10 / 10	Lost
1992	Bill Clinton/Al Gore	993,037	43.41%	11 / 11	Won
1996	Bill Clinton/Al Gore	1,123,323	49.84%	11 / 11	Won
2000	Al Gore/Joe Lieberman	1,247,652	50.13%	11 / 11	Lost
2004	John Kerry/John Edwards	1,510,201	52.77%	11 / 11	Lost
2008	Barack Obama/Joe Biden	1,750,848	57.65%	11 / 11	Won
2012	Barack Obama/Joe Biden	1,755,396	56.16%	12 / 12	Won
2016	Hillary Clinton/Tim Kaine	1,742,718	52.54%	8 / 12	Lost
2020	Joe Biden/Kamala Harris	2,369,612	57.97%	12 / 12	Won
2024	Kamala Harris/Tim Walz	2,245,849	57.23%	12 / 12	Lost

=== Senatorial ===
Washington Democratic Party senatorial election results
Election	Senatorial candidate	Votes	Vote %	Result
1914	William W. Black	91,733	26.57%	Lost ✗
1916	George Turner	135,339	37.06%	Lost ✗
1920	George F. Cotterill	68,488	17.80%	Lost ✗
1922	Clarence Dill	130,347	44.27%	Won ✓
1926	A. Scott Bullitt	148,783	46.51%	Lost ✗
1928	Clarence Dill	261,524	53.42%	Won ✓
1932	Homer Bone	365,939	60.61%	Won ✓
1934	Lewis Schwellenbach	302,606	60.93%	Won ✓
1938	Homer Bone	371,535	62.62%	Won ✓
1940	Monrad Wallgren	404,718	54.16%	Won ✓
1944	Warren Magnuson	452,013	55.13%	Won ✓
1946	Hugh Mitchell	298,683	45.23%	Lost ✗
1950	Warren Magnuson	397,719	53.40%	Won ✓
1952	Henry M. Jackson	595,288	56.23%	Won ✓
1956	Warren Magnuson	685,565	61.09%	Won ✓
1958	Henry M. Jackson	597,040	67.32%	Won ✓
1962	Warren Magnuson	491,365	52.09%	Won ✓
1964	Henry M. Jackson	875,950	72.21%	Won ✓
1968	Warren Magnuson	796,183	64.41%	Won ✓
1970	Henry M. Jackson	879,385	82.43%	Won ✓
1974	Warren Magnuson	611,811	60.70%	Won ✓
1976	Henry M. Jackson	1,071,219	71.84%	Won ✓
1980	Warren Magnuson	792,052	45.83%	Lost ✗
1982	Henry M. Jackson	943,665	68.96%	Won ✓
1983 (special)	Mike Lowry	540,981	44.59%	Lost ✗
1986	Brock Adams	677,471	50.66%	Won ✓
1988	Mike Lowry	904,183	48.91%	Lost ✗
1992	Patty Murray	1,197,973	53.99%	Won ✓
1994	Ron Sims	752,352	44.25%	Lost ✗
1998	Patty Murray	1,103,184	58.41%	Won ✓
2000	Maria Cantwell	1,199,437	48.73%	Won ✓
2004	Patty Murray	1,549,708	54.98%	Won ✓
2006	Maria Cantwell	1,184,659	56.81%	Won ✓
2010	Patty Murray	1,314,930	52.36%	Won ✓
2012	Maria Cantwell	1,855,493	60.45%	Won ✓
2016	Patty Murray	1,913,979	59.01%	Won ✓
2018	Maria Cantwell	1,803,364	58.43%	Won ✓
2022	Patty Murray	1,741,827	57.15%	Won ✓
2024	Maria Cantwell	2,252,577	59.09%	Won ✓

==== U.S. House ====
Election	Votes	%	Seats (WA)	±	%
2016	1,736,145	55.27	6 / 10	0	3.65
2018	1,888,593	62.50	7 / 10	▲1	7.23
2020	2,340,356	59.34	7 / 10	0	3.16
2022	1,751,591	57.81	8 / 10	▲1	1.43
2024	2,155,907	57.21	8 / 10	0	0.67
2026	TBD	TBD	8 / 10	0	TBD

=== State ===
==== Executive offices ====
Governor
Election	Candidate	Votes	Vote %	Result
1889	Eugene Semple	24,732	42.32%	Lost ✗
1892	Henry J. Snively	28,960	32.20%	Lost ✗
1896	John Rankin Rogers	50,849	55.55%	Won ✓
1900	John Rankin Rogers	52,048	48.86%	Won ✓
1904	George Turner	59,119	40.87%	Lost ✗
1908	John Pattison	58,126	33.00%	Lost ✗
1912	Ernest Lister	97,251	30.55%	Won ✓
1916	Ernest Lister	181,645	48.10%	Won ✓
1920	William Wilson Black	66,079	16.39%	Lost ✗
1924	Ben F. Hill	126,447	32.40%	Lost ✗
1928	A. Scott Bullitt	214,334	42.73%	Lost ✗
1932	Clarence D. Martin	352,215	57.29%	Won ✓
1936	Clarence D. Martin	466,550	69.36%	Won ✓
1940	Clarence Dill	386,706	49.49%	Lost ✗
1944	Monrad Wallgren	428,834	51.51%	Won ✓
1948	Monrad Wallgren	417,035	47.22%	Lost ✗
1952	Hugh Mitchell	510,675	47.35%	Lost ✗
1956	Albert Rosellini	616,773	54.63%	Won ✓
1960	Albert Rosellini	611,987	50.34%	Won ✓
1964	Albert Rosellini	548,692	43.89%	Lost ✗
1968	John J. O'Connell	560,262	44.28%	Lost ✗
1972	Albert Rosellini	630,613	42.82%	Lost ✗
1976	Dixy Lee Ray	821,797	53.14%	Won ✓
1980	Jim McDermott	749,813	43.32%	Lost ✗
1984	Booth Gardner	1,006,993	53.31%	Won ✓
1988	Booth Gardner	1,166,448	62.21%	Won ✓
1992	Mike Lowry	1,184,315	52.16%	Won ✓
1996	Gary Locke	1,296,492	57.96%	Won ✓
2000	Gary Locke	1,441,973	58.38%	Won ✓
2004	Christine Gregoire	1,373,361	48.87%	Won ✓
2008	Christine Gregoire	1,598,738	53.24%	Won ✓
2012	Jay Inslee	1,582,802	51.54%	Won ✓
2016	Jay Inslee	1,760,520	54.25%	Won ✓
2020	Jay Inslee	2,294,243	56.56%	Won ✓
2024	Bob Ferguson	2,143,368	55.51%	Won ✓

Lieutenant Governor
Election	Candidate	Votes	Vote %	Result
2000	Brad Owen	1,247,838	54.25%	Won ✓
2004	Brad Owen	1,443,505	54.39%	Won ✓
2008	Brad Owen	1,718,033	60.80%	Won ✓
2012	Brad Owen	1,575,133	53.68%	Won ✓
2016	Cyrus Habib	1,698,297	54.39%	Won ✓
2020	Denny Heck	1,658,405	45.61%	Won ✓
2020	Marko Liias	1,218,548	33.51%	Lost ✗
2024	Denny Heck	2,112,132	55.72%	Won ✓

Attorney General
Election	Candidate	Votes	Vote %	Result
2000	Christine Gregoire	1,292,887	55.98%	Won ✓
2004	Deborah Senn	1,163,964	43.27%	Lost ✗
2008	John Ladenburg	1,152,174	40.54%	Lost ✗
2012	Bob Ferguson	1,564,443	53.48%	Won ✓
2016	Bob Ferguson	2,000,804	67.14%	Won ✓
2020	Bob Ferguson	2,226,418	56.43%	Won ✓
2024	Nick Brown	2,093,570	55.58%	Won ✓

== See also ==
- Washington State Republican Party
