= 2016 Washington lieutenant gubernatorial election =

- November 8, 2016
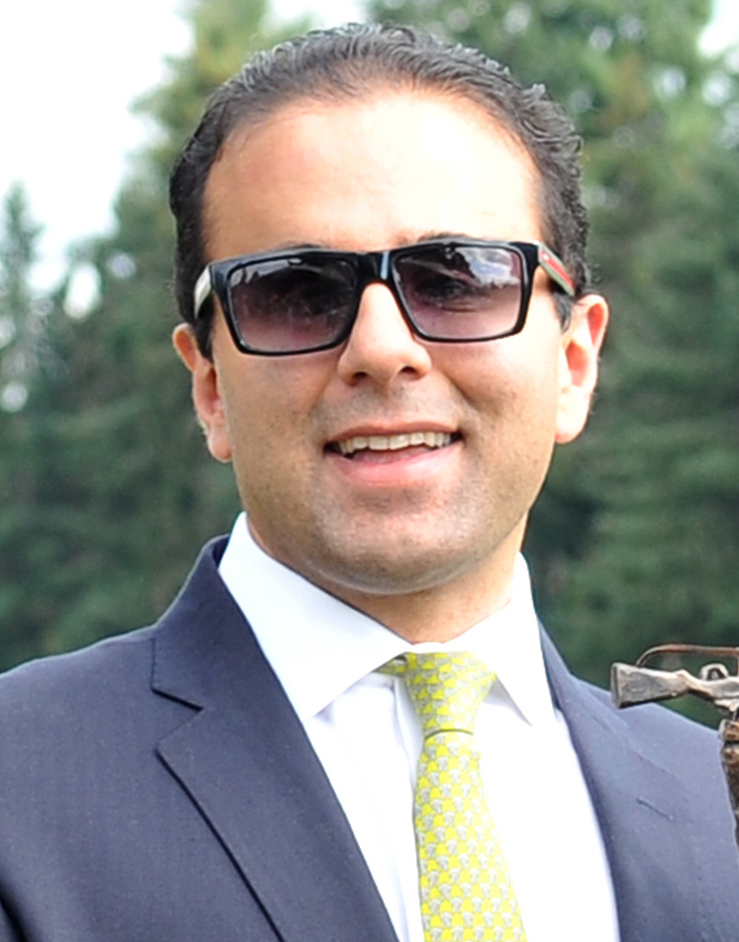

Nominee	Cyrus Habib	Marty McClendon
Party	Democratic	Republican
Popular vote	1,698,297	1,424,277
Percentage	54.39%	45.61%
- Habib: 50–60% 60–70% 70–80% 80–90% McClendon: 50–60% 60–70% 70–80%
Lieutenant Governor before election
Brad Owen
Democratic
Elected Lieutenant Governor
Cyrus Habib
Democratic

The 2016 Washington lieutenant gubernatorial election was held on November 8, 2016. The top-two primary was held on August 2. Washington is one of two states that holds a top-two primary, meaning that all candidates are listed on the same ballot regardless of party affiliation, and the top two move on to the general election.

Incumbent Democratic lieutenant governor Brad Owen, first elected to the office in 1996, announced that he would not seek a sixth term. Democratic state senator Cyrus Habib defeated Republican radio host Marty McClendon to succeed Owen.

== Candidates ==
=== Democratic Party ===
==== Advanced to general ====
- Cyrus Habib, state senator

==== Eliminated in primary ====
- Karen Fraser, state senator
- Steve Hobbs, state senator
- Karen Wallace

==== Declined ====
- Brad Owen, incumbent lieutenant governor (1997–2017)

=== Republican Party ===
==== Advanced to general ====
- Marty McClendon, radio host and candidate of Washington's 6th congressional district in 2014

==== Eliminated in primary ====
- Javier Figueroa, University Place city councilor
- Bill Penor
- Phillip Yin, journalist

=== Third-party and independent candidates ===
==== Eliminated in primary ====
- Paul Addis (Libertarian), business analyst for Alaska Airlines
- Daniel Davies (Independent)
- Mark Greene (Citizens), perennial candidate

== Primary election ==
=== Endorsements ===
Steve Hobbs (D)

Executive branch officials

- Gary Locke, former United States Secretary of Commerce (2009–2011) and governor of Washington (1997–2005)

State legislators

- Mark Mullet, state senator from the 5th district (2012–2025)
- Larry Springer, state representative from the 45th district (2005–present)

Labor unions

- Washington State Building & Construction Trades Council
- Washington Realtors

Newspapers

- The Seattle Times
Karen Fraser (D)

State officials

- James McIntire, state treasurer of Washington (2009–2017)

State legislators

- Jim Moeller, speaker pro tempore of the Washington House of Representatives (2011–2017) from the 49th district (2003–2017)

Trade unions

- Washington Federation of State Employees
- Washington State Nurses Association
- International Brotherhood of Electrical Workers Local 77

Organizations

- EMILYs List

Newspapers

- The News Tribune
Cyrus Habib (D)

U.S. representatives

- Norm Dicks, former WA-06 (1997–2013)

State officials

- Bob Ferguson, attorney general of Washington (2013–2025)

State legislators

- Steve Bergquist, state representative from the 11th district (2013–present)

Labor unions

- Washington Federation of Teachers
- Washington Education Association
- Washington State Council of County & City Employees

Organizations

- League of Conservation Voters
Javier Figueroa (R)

State officials

- Rob McKenna, former attorney general of Washington (2005–2013)
Phillip Yin (R)

State legislators

- Brian Dansel, state senator from the 7th district (2013–2017)

Organizations

- Mainstream Republicans of Washington

=== Results ===
Four Democrats (three of whom were state senators), four Republicans, two third-party candidates, and one independent competed in the primary election. Cyrus Habib (D) and Marty McClendon (R) finished as top two and advanced to the general election.

County results Habib: 20–30%; 30–40%; McClendon: 20–30%; 30–40%; 40–50%; Fraser: 30–40%; Hobbs: 20–30%

Congressional district results Habib: 20–30%; 30–40%; 40–50%; McClendon: 20–30%; 30–40%; Fraser: 20–30%

Blanket primary results
Party	Candidate	Votes	%
Democratic	Cyrus Habib	294,641	22.26
Republican	Marty McClendon	253,714	19.17
Democratic	Karen Fraser	207,271	15.66
Democratic	Steve Hobbs	202,427	15.29
Republican	Phillip Yin	141,680	10.70
Democratic	Karen Wallace	59,175	4.47
Republican	Javier Figueroa	56,214	4.25
Republican	Bill Penor	52,986	4.00
Libertarian	Paul Addis	26,304	1.99
Independent	Daniel Davies	16,491	1.25
Citizens Party	Mark Greene	12,692	0.96
Total votes		1,323,595	100.00

Counties that flipped from Democratic to Republican

- Wahkiakum (largest city: Puget Island)

Counties that flipped from Republican to Democratic

- Clark (largest city: Vancouver)

==== By congressional district ====
District	Habib	McClendon	Fraser	Hobbs	Yin	Representative
1st	22%	19%	11%	19%	15%	Suzan DelBene
2nd	22%	18%	15%	17%	11%	Rick Larsen
3rd	10%	25%	17%	15%	9%	Jaime Herrera Beutler
4th	6%	33%	11%	13%	14%	Dan Newhouse
5th	10%	26%	12%	16%	12%	Cathy McMorris Rodgers
6th	20%	22%	18%	15%	9%	Derek Kilmer
7th	47%	6%	17%	15%	6%	Jim McDermott
8th	18%	24%	13%	15%	13%	Dave Reichert
9th	34%	11%	16%	15%	11%	Adam Smith
10th	16%	17%	25%	12%	11%	Denny Heck

== General election ==
=== Endorsements ===
Marty McClendon (R)

Organizations

- Washington Farm Bureau
- Human Life Washington
- NRA Political Victory Fund
Declined to endorse

Newspapers

- The Seattle Times (endorsed Hobbs in the primary)

=== Polling ===
Poll source	Date(s) administered	Sample size	Margin of error	Cyrus Habib (D)	Marty McClendon (R)	Undecided
Elway Poll	October 20–22, 2016	502 (RV)	± 4.5%	38%	37%	25%
Elway Poll	August 9–13, 2016	500 (RV)	± 4.5%	38%	33%	29%

=== Results ===
2016 Washington lieutenant gubernatorial election
Party	Candidate	Votes	%	±%
Democratic	Cyrus Habib	1,698,297	54.39	+0.71
Republican	Marty McClendon	1,424,277	45.61	–0.71
Total votes		3,122,574	100.00	N/A
Democratic hold				

==== By county ====
County results
County	Cyrus Habib Democratic		Marty McClendon Republican		Margin		Total votes
County	#	%	#	%	#	%	Total votes
Adams	1,317	29.34%	3,171	70.66%	-1,854	-41.31%	4,488
Asotin	3,365	35.65%	6,074	64.35%	-2,709	-28.70%	9,439
Benton	26,988	34.08%	52,203	65.92%	-25,215	-31.84%	79,191
Chelan	12,451	38.37%	19,997	61.63%	-7,546	-23.26%	32,448
Clallam	18,184	47.45%	20,140	52.55%	-1,956	-5.10%	38,324
Clark	91,829	47.14%	102,989	52.86%	-11,160	-5.73%	194,818
Columbia	543	26.02%	1,544	73.98%	-1,001	-47.96%	2,087
Cowlitz	18,783	42.23%	25,698	57.77%	-6,915	-15.55%	44,481
Douglas	4,807	31.81%	10,303	68.19%	-5,496	-36.37%	15,110
Ferry	1,189	34.25%	2,283	65.75%	-1,094	-31.51%	3,472
Franklin	8,721	37.19%	14,732	62.81%	-6,011	-25.63%	23,453
Garfield	296	24.79%	898	75.21%	-602	-50.42%	1,194
Grant	7,882	28.51%	19,769	71.49%	-11,887	-42.99%	27,651
Grays Harbor	13,202	47.23%	14,748	52.77%	-1,546	-5.53%	27,950
Island	21,090	50.18%	20,935	49.82%	155	0.37%	42,025
Jefferson	13,065	65.57%	6,861	34.43%	6,204	31.14%	19,926
King	670,754	70.13%	285,689	29.87%	385,065	40.26%	956,443
Kitsap	63,739	52.00%	58,842	48.00%	4,897	3.99%	122,581
Kittitas	7,249	39.70%	11,012	60.30%	-3,763	-20.61%	18,261
Klickitat	4,332	41.49%	6,109	58.51%	-1,777	-17.02%	10,441
Lewis	10,473	31.22%	23,077	68.78%	-12,604	-37.57%	33,550
Lincoln	1,267	22.74%	4,305	77.26%	-3,038	-54.52%	5,572
Mason	12,489	45.23%	15,123	54.77%	-2,634	-9.54%	27,612
Okanogan	6,483	39.08%	10,107	60.92%	-3,624	-21.84%	16,590
Pacific	4,950	47.90%	5,385	52.10%	-435	-4.21%	10,335
Pend Oreille	2,161	32.57%	4,473	67.43%	-2,312	-34.85%	6,634
Pierce	171,252	50.17%	170,097	49.83%	1,155	0.34%	341,349
San Juan	7,398	69.94%	3,179	30.06%	4,219	39.89%	10,577
Skagit	27,001	49.27%	27,803	50.73%	-802	-1.46%	54,804
Skamania	2,333	43.28%	3,058	56.72%	-725	-13.45%	5,391
Snohomish	181,853	53.82%	156,067	46.18%	25,786	7.63%	337,920
Spokane	94,838	42.55%	128,052	57.45%	-33,214	-14.90%	222,890
Stevens	6,133	27.65%	16,047	72.35%	-9,914	-44.70%	22,180
Thurston	69,735	55.21%	56,566	44.79%	13,169	10.43%	126,301
Wahkiakum	868	39.33%	1,339	60.67%	-471	-21.34%	2,207
Walla Walla	9,758	39.72%	14,806	60.28%	-5,048	-20.55%	24,564
Whatcom	60,786	56.51%	46,775	43.49%	14,011	13.03%	107,561
Whitman	8,179	48.37%	8,729	51.63%	-550	-3.25%	16,908
Yakima	30,554	40.28%	45,292	59.72%	-14,738	-19.43%	75,846
Totals	1,698,297	54.39%	1,424,277	45.61%	274,020	8.78%	3,122,574

Counties that flipped from Democratic to Republican

- Clallam (largest city: Port Angeles)
- Cowlitz (largest city: Longview)
- Grays Harbor (largest city: Aberdeen)
- Mason (largest city: Shelton)
- Pacific (largest city: Raymond)
- Skagit (largest city: Mount Vernon)
- Wahkiakum (largest city: Puget Island)

==== By congressional district ====
Habib won six of ten congressional districts.

District	Habib	McClendon	Representative
1st	53%	47%	Suzan DelBene
2nd	58%	42%	Rick Larsen
3rd	44%	56%	Jaime Herrera Beutler
4th	36%	64%	Dan Newhouse
5th	41%	59%	Cathy McMorris Rodgers
6th	53%	47%	Derek Kilmer
7th	81%	19%	Jim McDermott
7th	81%	19%	Pramila Jayapal
8th	46%	54%	Dave Reichert
9th	69%	31%	Adam Smith
10th	53%	47%	Denny Heck
