= 2004 Washington lieutenant gubernatorial election =

- November 2, 2004
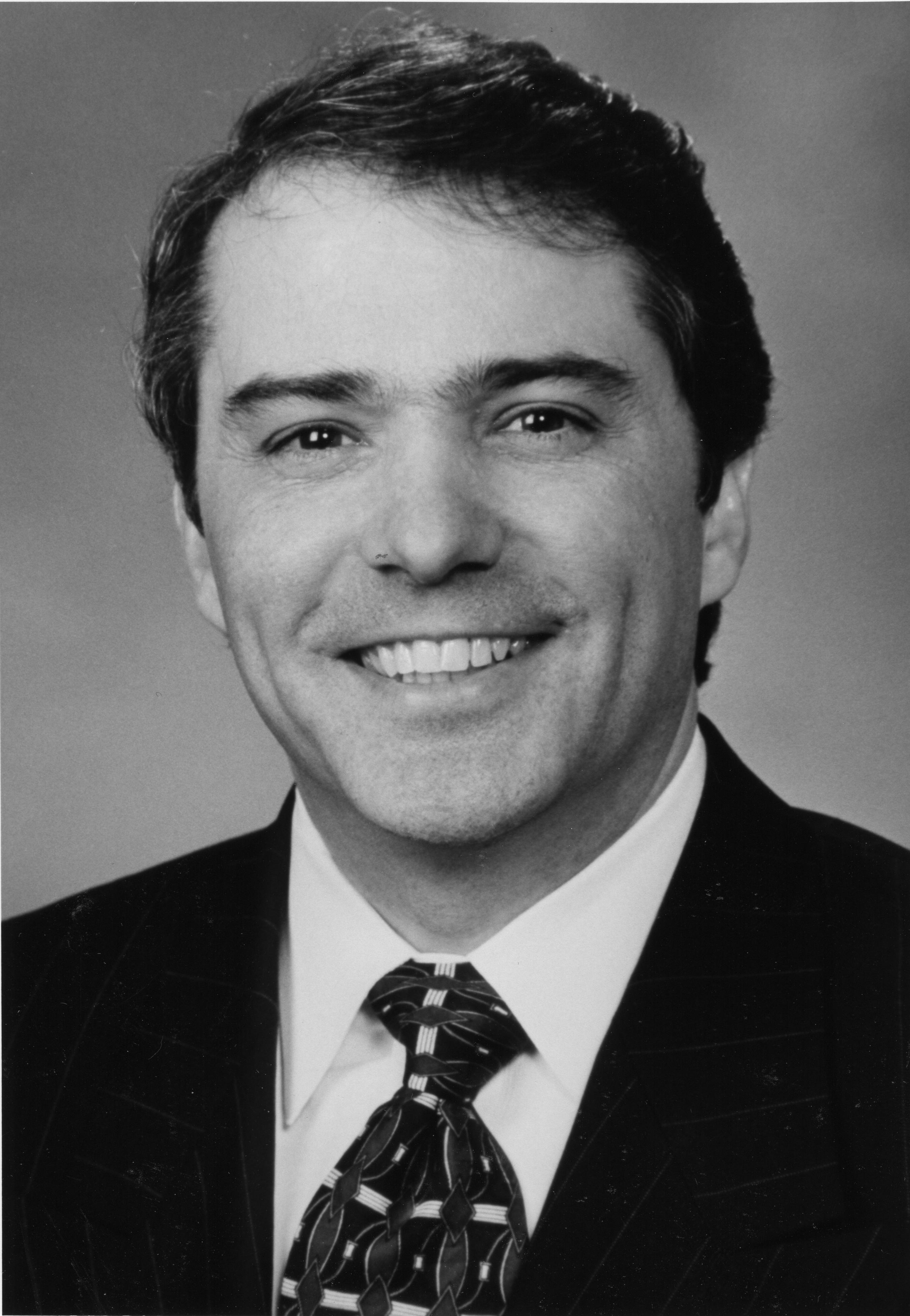

Nominee	Brad Owen	Jim Wiest
Party	Democratic	Republican
Popular vote	1,443,505	1,019,790
Percentage	54.39%	38.43%
- Owen: 40–50% 50–60% 60–70% Wiest: 40–50% 50–60%
Lieutenant Governor before election
Brad Owen
Democratic
Elected Lieutenant Governor
Brad Owen
Democratic

The 2004 Washington lieutenant gubernatorial election was held on November 2, 2004. Primary elections took place on September 14.

Incumbent Democratic lieutenant governor Brad Owen, first elected to the office in 1996, was re-elected to a third term in office, defeating Republican challenger Jim Wiest in a landslide.

== Democratic primary ==
=== Candidates ===
==== Nominee ====
- Brad Owen, incumbent lieutenant governor (1997–2017)

=== Results ===
Democratic primary results
Party	Candidate	Votes	%
Democratic	Brad Owen (incumbent)	625,427	100.00%
Total votes		625,427	100.00%

== Republican primary ==
=== Candidates ===
==== Nominee ====
- Jim Wiest, limousine driver

==== Eliminated in primary ====
- Scott Bonifield, real estate agent
- Jim Nobles, businessman

=== Results ===
Results by county Wiest: 30–40%; 40–50%; 50–60%; Nobles: 30–40%; 40–50%; 50–60%

Republican primary results
Party	Candidate	Votes	%
Republican	Jim Wiest	171,386	41.46%
Republican	Jim Nobles	147,495	35.68%
Republican	Scott Bonifield	94,496	22.86%
Total votes		413,377	100.00%

==== By county ====
County results
County	Jim Wiest		Jim Nobles		Scott Bonifield		Margin		Total votes
County	#	%	#	%	#	%	#	%	Total votes
Adams	718	48.58%	526	35.59%	234	15.83%	192	12.99%	1,478
Asotin	627	39.71%	597	37.81%	355	22.48%	30	1.90%	1,579
Benton	3,387	25.75%	6,651	50.56%	3,116	23.69%	-3,264	-24.81%	13,154
Chelan	1,720	36.60%	1,926	40.98%	1,054	22.43%	-206	-4.38%	4,700
Clallam	1,844	31.15%	2,491	42.08%	1,585	26.77%	-647	-10.93%	5,920
Clark	6,609	32.14%	9,606	46.71%	4,349	21.15%	-2,997	-14.57%	20,564
Columbia	230	40.35%	229	40.18%	111	19.47%	1	0.18%	570
Cowlitz	1,686	39.13%	1,688	39.17%	935	21.70%	-2	-0.05%	4,309
Douglas	1,239	41.58%	1,083	36.34%	658	22.08%	156	5.23%	2,980
Ferry	401	44.85%	300	33.56%	193	21.59%	101	11.30%	894
Franklin	1,141	32.38%	1,623	46.06%	760	21.57%	-482	-13.68%	3,524
Garfield	157	42.66%	125	33.97%	86	23.37%	32	8.70%	368
Grant	2,828	48.73%	1,829	31.52%	1,146	19.75%	999	17.22%	5,803
Grays Harbor	814	29.59%	1,063	38.64%	874	31.77%	-189	-6.87%	2,751
Island	2,464	35.96%	3,022	44.10%	1,366	19.94%	-558	-8.14%	6,852
Jefferson	910	38.20%	998	41.90%	474	19.90%	-88	-3.69%	2,382
King	44,025	42.39%	35,291	33.98%	24,539	23.63%	8,734	8.41%	103,855
Kitsap	7,688	39.98%	6,086	31.65%	5,456	28.37%	1,602	8.33%	19,230
Kittitas	953	30.54%	1,410	45.18%	758	24.29%	-457	-14.64%	3,121
Klickitat	391	33.16%	540	45.80%	248	21.03%	-149	-12.64%	1,179
Lewis	1,842	32.34%	2,519	44.23%	1,334	23.42%	-677	-11.89%	5,695
Lincoln	960	59.11%	427	26.29%	237	14.59%	533	32.82%	1,624
Mason	1,225	34.58%	1,638	46.25%	679	19.17%	-413	-11.66%	3,542
Okanogan	1,710	45.33%	1,260	33.40%	802	21.26%	450	11.93%	3,772
Pacific	377	30.63%	585	47.52%	269	21.85%	-208	-16.90%	1,231
Pend Oreille	880	53.69%	492	30.02%	267	16.29%	388	23.67%	1,639
Pierce	21,042	44.59%	13,532	28.67%	12,621	26.74%	7,510	15.91%	47,195
San Juan	534	43.45%	490	39.87%	205	16.68%	44	3.58%	1,229
Skagit	2,665	33.93%	3,519	44.80%	1,671	21.27%	-854	-10.87%	7,855
Skamania	260	31.71%	360	43.90%	200	24.39%	-100	-12.20%	820
Snohomish	19,592	47.57%	12,413	30.14%	9,181	22.29%	7,179	17.43%	41,186
Spokane	20,236	50.13%	13,378	33.14%	6,750	16.72%	6,858	16.99%	40,364
Stevens	2,133	47.85%	1,628	36.52%	697	15.63%	505	11.33%	4,458
Thurston	5,609	40.66%	5,247	38.04%	2,939	21.30%	362	2.62%	13,795
Wahkiakum	99	42.13%	78	33.19%	58	24.68%	21	8.94%	235
Walla Walla	1,548	30.28%	2,255	44.10%	1,310	25.62%	-707	-13.83%	5,113
Whatcom	3,577	34.69%	4,366	42.34%	2,368	22.97%	-789	-7.65%	10,311
Whitman	1,757	52.87%	1,057	31.81%	509	15.32%	700	21.07%	3,323
Yakima	5,508	37.27%	5,167	34.97%	4,102	27.76%	341	2.31%	14,777
Totals	171,386	41.46%	147,495	35.68%	94,496	22.86%	23,891	5.78%	413,377

== Libertarian primary ==
=== Candidates ===
==== Nominee ====
- Jocelyn A. Langlois, acting chair of the Libertarian Party of Washington

=== Results ===
Libertarian primary results
Party	Candidate	Votes	%
Libertarian	Jocelyn A. Langlois	12,760	100.00%
Total votes		12,760	100.00%

== General election ==
=== Endorsements ===
Brad Owen (D)

Newspapers

- The Seattle Times

=== Results ===
2004 Washington lieutenant gubernatorial election
Party	Candidate	Votes	%	±%
Democratic	Brad Owen (incumbent)	1,443,505	54.39	+0.14
Republican	Jim Wiest	1,019,790	38.43	+0.48
Libertarian	Jocelyn A. Langlois	117,147	4.41	–3.40
Green	Bern Haggerty	73,328	2.76	N/A
Total votes		2,653,770	100.00	N/A
Democratic hold				

==== By county ====
County	Brad Owen Democratic		Jim Wiest Republican		Various candidates Other parties		Margin		Total
County	#	%	#	%	#	%	#	%	Total
Adams	1,784	37.42%	2,778	58.26%	206	4.32%	-994	-20.85%	4,768
Asotin	3,507	42.78%	4,252	51.87%	438	5.34%	-745	-9.09%	8,197
Benton	25,068	40.34%	33,413	53.76%	3,667	5.90%	-8,345	-13.43%	62,148
Chelan	10,741	39.45%	14,929	54.83%	1,557	5.72%	-4,188	-15.38%	27,227
Clallam	18,242	53.29%	13,773	40.24%	2,215	6.47%	4,469	13.06%	34,230
Clark	74,984	48.14%	72,280	46.41%	8,489	5.45%	2,704	1.74%	155,753
Columbia	774	40.23%	1,073	55.77%	77	4.00%	-299	-15.54%	1,924
Cowlitz	21,627	54.36%	15,705	39.47%	2,456	6.17%	5,922	14.88%	39,788
Douglas	4,702	37.45%	7,267	57.88%	587	4.68%	-2,565	-20.43%	12,556
Ferry	1,254	40.48%	1,619	52.26%	225	7.26%	-365	-11.78%	3,098
Franklin	6,241	41.09%	8,275	54.48%	673	4.43%	-2,034	-13.39%	15,189
Garfield	465	38.43%	692	57.19%	53	4.38%	-227	-18.76%	1,210
Grant	8,898	36.32%	14,334	58.51%	1,266	5.17%	-5,436	-22.19%	24,498
Grays Harbor	17,324	65.36%	7,774	29.33%	1,407	5.31%	9,550	36.03%	26,505
Island	17,820	49.84%	15,681	43.86%	2,254	6.30%	2,139	5.98%	35,755
Jefferson	11,015	62.05%	5,332	30.03%	1,406	7.92%	5,683	32.01%	17,753
King	502,464	61.50%	236,384	28.93%	78,126	9.56%	266,080	32.57%	816,974
Kitsap	63,476	56.63%	41,531	37.05%	7,082	6.32%	21,945	19.58%	112,089
Kittitas	7,215	48.10%	6,699	44.66%	1,086	7.24%	516	3.44%	15,000
Klickitat	3,917	46.20%	3,961	46.72%	600	7.08%	-44	-0.52%	8,478
Lewis	13,294	44.03%	15,195	50.32%	1,706	5.65%	-1,901	-6.30%	30,195
Lincoln	2,151	40.62%	2,923	55.19%	222	4.19%	-772	-14.58%	5,296
Mason	15,518	64.09%	7,167	29.60%	1,527	6.31%	8,351	34.49%	24,212
Okanogan	6,447	42.75%	7,542	50.01%	1,092	7.24%	-1,095	-7.26%	15,081
Pacific	5,626	58.53%	3,308	34.42%	678	7.05%	2,318	24.12%	9,612
Pend Oreille	2,525	43.10%	2,981	50.89%	352	6.01%	-456	-7.78%	5,858
Pierce	160,752	54.60%	117,205	39.81%	16,477	5.60%	43,547	14.79%	294,434
San Juan	5,317	56.95%	2,798	29.97%	1,222	13.09%	2,519	26.98%	9,337
Skagit	25,212	51.38%	20,481	41.74%	3,372	6.87%	4,731	9.64%	49,065
Skamania	2,266	47.83%	2,077	43.84%	395	8.34%	189	3.99%	4,738
Snohomish	151,569	55.04%	107,079	38.89%	16,720	6.07%	44,490	16.16%	275,368
Spokane	88,439	46.17%	93,482	48.80%	9,650	5.04%	-5,043	-2.63%	191,571
Stevens	7,223	38.04%	10,547	55.54%	1,220	6.42%	-3,324	-17.50%	18,990
Thurston	63,612	60.20%	33,945	32.13%	8,106	7.67%	29,667	28.08%	105,663
Wahkiakum	1,004	49.78%	873	43.28%	140	6.94%	131	6.49%	2,017
Walla Walla	9,526	44.93%	10,540	49.71%	1,136	5.36%	-1,014	-4.78%	21,202
Whatcom	41,782	50.80%	32,295	39.27%	8,168	9.93%	9,487	11.54%	82,245
Whitman	7,617	46.00%	7,800	47.10%	1,143	6.90%	-183	-1.11%	16,560
Yakima	32,107	46.41%	33,800	48.85%	3,279	4.74%	-1,693	-2.45%	69,186
Totals	1,443,505	54.39%	1,019,790	38.43%	190,475	7.18%	423,715	15.97%	2,653,770

Counties that flipped from Democratic to Republican

- Klickitat (largest city: Goldendale)
- Pend Oreille (largest city: Newport)
- Spokane (largest city: Spokane)
- Whitman (largest city: Pullman)
