= 2000 Washington lieutenant gubernatorial election =

- November 7, 2000
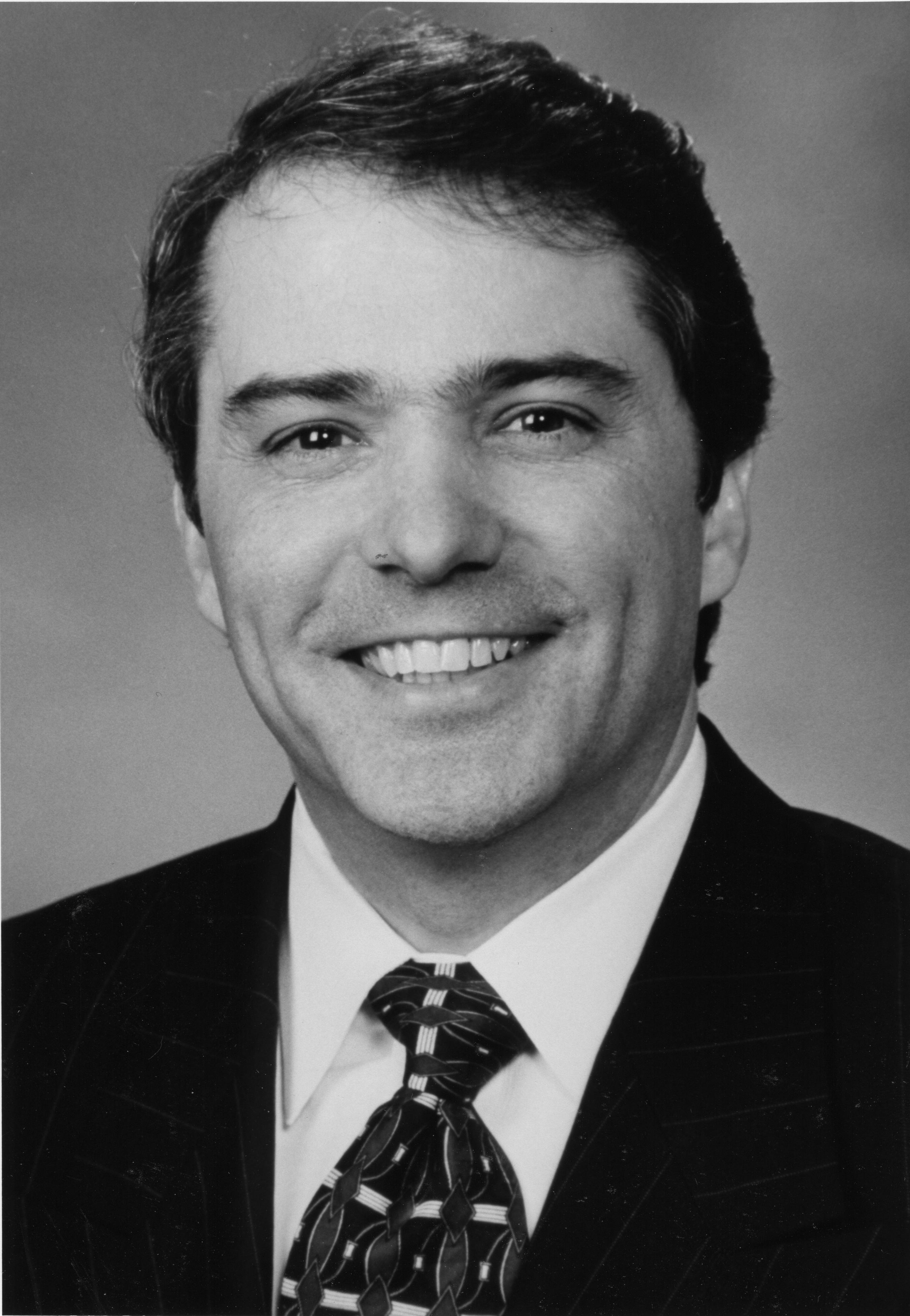

Nominee	Brad Owen	Mike Elliott	Ruth Bennett
Party	Democratic	Republican	Libertarian
Popular vote	1,247,838	872,853	179,567
Percentage	54.25%	37.95%	7.81%
- Owen: 40–50% 50–60% 60–70% Elliott: 40–50% 50–60%
Lieutenant Governor before election
Brad Owen
Democratic
Elected Lieutenant Governor
Brad Owen
Democratic

The 2000 Washington lieutenant gubernatorial election was held on November 7, 2000.

Incumbent Democratic lieutenant governor Brad Owen, first elected to the office in 1996, was re-elected to a second term in office, defeating Republican challenger Mike Elliott in a landslide.

== Candidates ==
=== Democratic Party ===
==== Advanced to general ====
- Brad Owen, incumbent lieutenant governor (1997–2017)

==== Eliminated in primary ====
- Lonnie Williams Sr., Mountlake Terrace city councilor

=== Republican Party ===
==== Advanced to general ====
- Mike Elliott, mayor of Rainier

==== Eliminated in primary ====
- Joe Mitschelen, Army reservist and engineer

=== Libertarian Party ===
==== Advanced to general ====
- Ruth Bennett, travel agent

== Primary election ==
The blanket primary was held on September 19.

=== Results ===
Results by county Owen: 30–40%; 40–50%; 50–60%; 60–70%; Elliott: 20–30%; 30–40%; Mitschelen: 30–40%

Blanket primary results
Party	Candidate	Votes	%
Democratic	Brad Owen (incumbent)	502,523	43.54
Republican	Mike Elliott	279,494	24.22
Republican	Joe Mitschelen	160,186	13.88
Democratic	Lonnie Williams Sr.	129,966	11.26
Libertarian	Ruth Bennett	82,035	7.11
Total votes		1,154,204	100.00

==== By county ====
County results
County	Brad Owen Democratic		Mike Elliott Republican		Joe Mitschelen Republican		Lonnie William Sr. Democratic		Ruth Bennett Libertarian		Margin		Total votes
County	#	%	#	%	#	%	#	%	#	%	#	%	Total votes
Adams	941	32.57%	987	34.16%	575	19.90%	240	8.31%	146	5.05%	-46	-1.59%	2,889
Asotin	1,070	25.31%	1,192	28.20%	658	15.57%	934	22.10%	373	8.82%	-122	-2.89%	4,227
Benton	8,839	33.48%	8,343	31.61%	5,207	19.73%	2,469	9.35%	1,539	5.83%	496	1.88%	26,397
Chelan	4,580	30.99%	4,180	28.29%	4,091	27.68%	1,079	7.30%	847	5.73%	400	2.71%	14,777
Clallam	8,426	46.10%	4,317	23.62%	2,698	14.76%	1,510	8.26%	1,328	7.27%	4,109	22.48%	18,279
Clark	19,852	37.65%	15,535	29.46%	7,755	14.71%	5,963	11.31%	3,627	6.88%	4,317	8.19%	52,732
Columbia	400	31.77%	454	36.06%	226	17.95%	113	8.98%	66	5.24%	-54	-4.29%	1,259
Cowlitz	8,137	43.91%	3,947	21.30%	2,589	13.97%	2,509	13.54%	1,348	7.27%	4,190	22.61%	18,530
Douglas	2,113	29.88%	2,221	31.41%	1,744	24.66%	609	8.61%	384	5.43%	-108	-1.53%	7,071
Ferry	629	31.43%	578	28.89%	450	22.49%	190	9.50%	154	7.70%	51	2.55%	2,001
Franklin	2,323	32.64%	2,424	34.05%	1,207	16.96%	741	10.41%	423	5.94%	-101	-1.42%	7,118
Garfield	302	36.21%	280	33.57%	127	15.23%	77	9.23%	48	5.76%	22	2.64%	834
Grant	3,362	29.23%	3,564	30.99%	2,804	24.38%	1,001	8.70%	770	6.70%	-202	-1.76%	11,501
Grays Harbor	9,305	62.74%	1,948	13.13%	1,423	9.59%	1,348	9.09%	808	5.45%	7,357	49.60%	14,832
Island	6,499	37.21%	5,131	29.38%	2,714	15.54%	1,936	11.09%	1,184	6.78%	1,368	7.83%	17,464
Jefferson	4,917	50.02%	1,782	18.13%	1,313	13.36%	942	9.58%	877	8.92%	3,135	31.89%	9,831
King	161,993	49.56%	62,511	19.13%	40,378	12.35%	35,066	10.73%	26,899	8.23%	99,482	30.44%	326,847
Kitsap	26,965	46.98%	12,767	22.25%	7,641	13.31%	6,241	10.87%	3,777	6.58%	14,198	24.74%	57,391
Kittitas	2,405	39.28%	1,560	25.48%	1,171	19.12%	534	8.72%	453	7.40%	845	13.80%	6,123
Klickitat	1,168	37.62%	815	26.25%	647	20.84%	273	8.79%	202	6.51%	353	11.37%	3,105
Lewis	5,684	36.95%	5,126	33.33%	2,344	15.24%	1,223	7.95%	1,004	6.53%	558	3.63%	15,381
Lincoln	1,069	34.46%	1,065	34.33%	570	18.38%	261	8.41%	137	4.42%	4	0.13%	3,102
Mason	8,197	61.88%	2,343	17.69%	961	7.25%	976	7.37%	770	5.81%	5,854	44.19%	13,247
Okanogan	2,103	25.05%	1,739	20.71%	3,155	37.58%	719	8.56%	679	8.09%	-1,052	-12.53%	8,395
Pacific	2,508	48.08%	1,182	22.66%	490	9.39%	673	12.90%	363	6.96%	1,326	25.42%	5,216
Pend Oreille	1,220	36.41%	936	27.93%	536	16.00%	383	11.43%	276	8.24%	284	8.48%	3,351
Pierce	56,673	42.18%	34,762	25.87%	16,032	11.93%	17,634	13.12%	9,274	6.90%	21,911	16.31%	134,375
San Juan	1,903	46.16%	913	22.14%	519	12.59%	343	8.32%	445	10.79%	990	24.01%	4,123
Skagit	8,542	40.34%	5,744	27.13%	3,308	15.62%	1,928	9.11%	1,653	7.81%	2,798	13.21%	21,175
Skamania	723	34.88%	546	26.34%	334	16.11%	234	11.29%	236	11.38%	177	8.54%	2,073
Snohomish	44,674	40.16%	26,586	23.90%	17,057	15.33%	15,300	13.75%	7,632	6.86%	18,088	16.26%	111,249
Spokane	31,593	38.19%	24,622	29.76%	10,265	12.41%	11,335	13.70%	4,917	5.94%	6,971	8.43%	82,732
Stevens	2,622	27.53%	3,267	34.30%	1,709	17.94%	1,031	10.83%	895	9.40%	-645	-6.77%	9,524
Thurston	29,481	55.67%	10,653	20.12%	4,937	9.32%	4,640	8.76%	3,248	6.13%	18,828	35.55%	52,959
Wahkiakum	427	35.76%	306	25.63%	197	16.50%	152	12.73%	112	9.38%	121	10.13%	1,194
Walla Walla	3,885	38.58%	3,109	30.87%	1,660	16.48%	848	8.42%	569	5.65%	776	7.71%	10,071
Whatcom	11,689	40.14%	8,528	29.29%	3,571	12.26%	3,378	11.60%	1,953	6.71%	3,161	10.86%	29,119
Whitman	2,678	35.61%	2,616	34.78%	1,003	13.34%	769	10.22%	455	6.05%	62	0.82%	7,521
Yakima	12,626	34.89%	10,915	30.16%	6,120	16.91%	4,364	12.06%	2,164	5.98%	1,711	4.73%	36,189
Totals	502,523	43.54%	279,494	24.22%	160,186	13.88%	129,966	11.26%	82,035	7.11%	223,029	19.32%	1,154,204

== General election ==
=== Results ===
2000 Washington lieutenant gubernatorial election
Party	Candidate	Votes	%	±%
Democratic	Brad Owen (incumbent)	1,247,838	54.25	+6.23
Republican	Mike Elliott	872,853	37.95	–8.51
Libertarian	Ruth Bennett	179,567	7.81	+5.97
Total votes		2,300,258	100.00	N/A
Democratic hold				

==== By county ====
County	Brad Owen Democratic		Mike Elliott Republican		Ruth Bennett Libertarian		Margin		Total
County	#	%	#	%	#	%	#	%	Total
Adams	1,934	41.79%	2,489	53.78%	205	4.43%	-555	-11.99%	4,628
Asotin	3,346	45.49%	3,473	47.21%	537	7.30%	-127	-1.73%	7,356
Benton	23,921	42.92%	28,450	51.04%	3,365	6.04%	-4,529	-8.13%	55,736
Chelan	9,334	38.30%	13,311	54.62%	1,727	7.09%	-3,977	-16.32%	24,372
Clallam	15,642	52.05%	12,011	39.97%	2,396	7.97%	3,631	12.08%	30,049
Clark	62,412	48.98%	56,765	44.54%	8,256	6.48%	5,647	4.43%	127,433
Columbia	753	38.46%	1,079	55.11%	126	6.44%	-326	-16.65%	1,958
Cowlitz	18,849	54.18%	13,305	38.24%	2,636	7.58%	5,544	15.94%	34,790
Douglas	4,508	37.40%	6,786	56.31%	758	6.29%	-2,278	-18.90%	12,052
Ferry	1,160	40.87%	1,416	49.89%	262	9.23%	-256	-9.02%	2,838
Franklin	5,814	43.78%	6,727	50.66%	739	5.56%	-913	-6.88%	13,280
Garfield	493	40.68%	640	52.81%	79	6.52%	-147	-12.13%	1,212
Grant	8,347	37.13%	12,552	55.83%	1,584	7.05%	-4,205	-18.70%	22,483
Grays Harbor	16,528	66.66%	6,551	26.42%	1,717	6.92%	9,977	40.24%	24,796
Island	14,760	48.25%	13,562	44.34%	2,267	7.41%	1,198	3.92%	30,589
Jefferson	8,989	60.01%	4,737	31.62%	1,254	8.37%	4,252	28.38%	14,980
King	433,564	60.73%	213,323	29.88%	66,982	9.38%	220,241	30.85%	713,869
Kitsap	54,800	56.16%	36,122	37.02%	6,654	6.82%	18,678	19.14%	97,576
Kittitas	6,142	46.72%	5,952	45.28%	1,052	8.00%	190	1.45%	13,146
Klickitat	3,511	46.67%	3,404	45.25%	608	8.08%	107	1.42%	7,523
Lewis	12,232	43.43%	13,948	49.52%	1,985	7.05%	-1,716	-6.09%	28,165
Lincoln	2,002	41.60%	2,580	53.62%	230	4.78%	-578	-12.01%	4,812
Mason	13,859	64.13%	6,207	28.72%	1,545	7.15%	7,652	35.41%	21,611
Okanogan	5,201	37.84%	7,273	52.91%	1,272	9.25%	-2,072	-15.07%	13,746
Pacific	5,139	58.68%	2,966	33.87%	652	7.45%	2,173	24.81%	8,757
Pend Oreille	2,303	45.56%	2,279	45.08%	473	9.36%	24	0.47%	5,055
Pierce	136,108	54.03%	98,016	38.91%	17,767	7.05%	38,092	15.12%	251,891
San Juan	4,348	55.86%	2,610	33.53%	826	10.61%	1,738	22.33%	7,784
Skagit	21,242	50.56%	17,482	41.61%	3,287	7.82%	3,760	8.95%	42,011
Skamania	1,834	46.08%	1,689	42.44%	457	11.48%	145	3.64%	3,980
Snohomish	125,643	53.52%	91,891	39.14%	17,233	7.34%	33,752	14.38%	234,767
Spokane	80,441	50.27%	69,352	43.34%	10,228	6.39%	11,089	6.93%	160,021
Stevens	6,485	39.18%	8,607	52.00%	1,459	8.82%	-2,122	-12.82%	16,551
Thurston	55,648	60.87%	28,822	31.53%	6,951	7.60%	26,826	29.34%	91,421
Wahkiakum	876	49.08%	763	42.75%	146	8.18%	113	6.33%	1,785
Walla Walla	8,824	44.49%	9,815	49.49%	1,193	6.02%	-991	-5.00%	19,832
Whatcom	33,862	50.94%	27,219	40.95%	5,390	8.11%	6,643	9.99%	66,471
Whitman	6,914	46.86%	6,771	45.89%	1,070	7.25%	143	0.97%	14,755
Yakima	30,070	45.44%	31,908	48.22%	4,199	6.35%	-1,838	-2.78%	66,177
Totals	1,247,838	54.25%	872,853	37.95%	179,567	7.81%	374,985	16.30%	2,300,258

Counties that flipped from Democratic to Republican

- Asotin (largest city: Clarkston)

Counties that flipped from Republican to Democratic

- Clallam (largest city: Port Angeles)
- Clark (largest city: Vancouver)
- Island (largest city: Oak Harbor)
- Kittitas (largest city: Ellensburg)
- Klickitat (largest city: Goldendale)
- Pend Oreille (largest city: Newport)
- Skagit (largest city: Mount Vernon)
- Skamania (largest city: Carson)
- Snohomish (largest city: Everett)
- Spokane (largest city: Spokane)
- Whatcom (largest city: Bellingham)
- Whitman (largest city: Pullman)
