= 2012 Washington lieutenant gubernatorial election =

- November 6, 2012
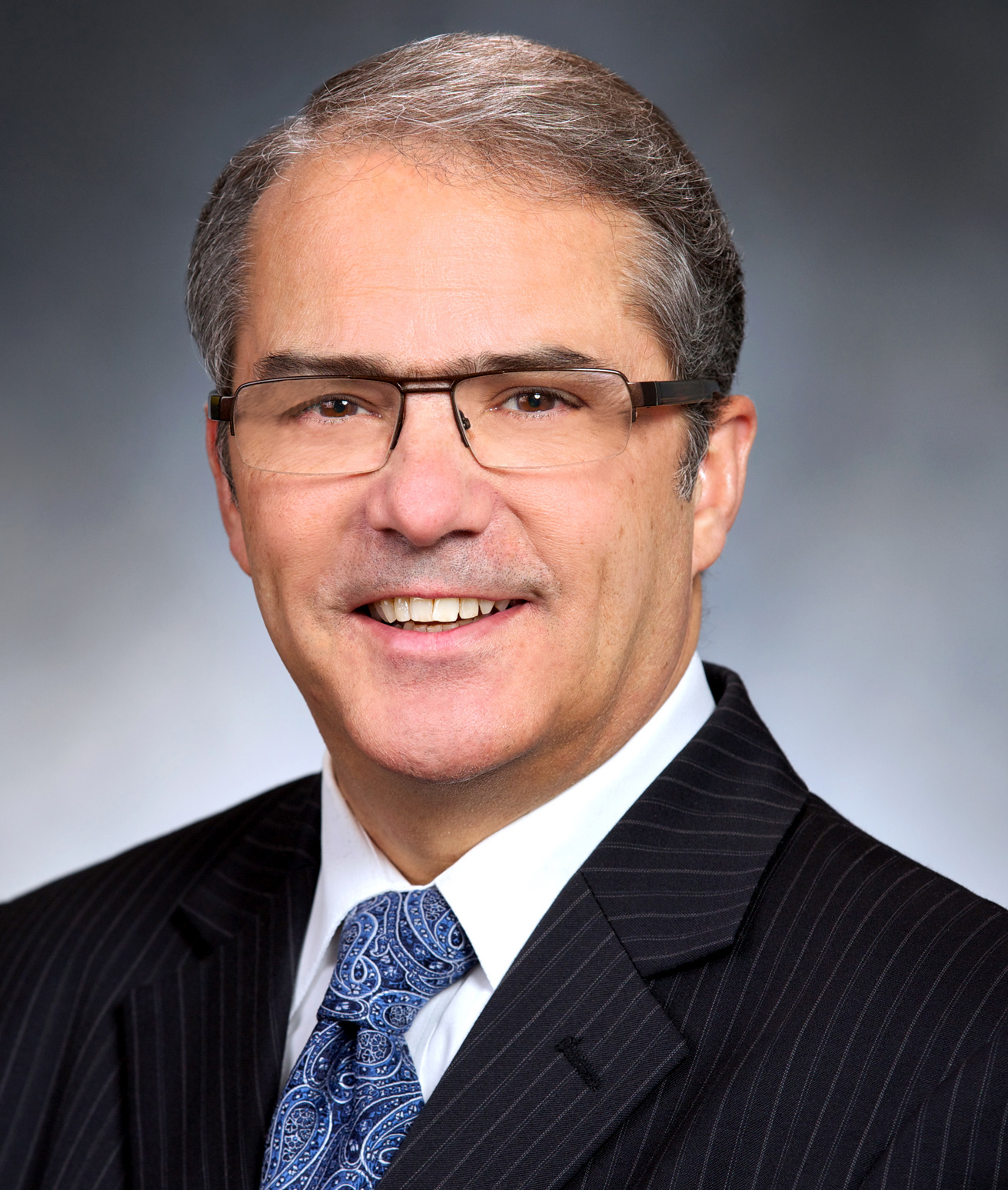

Nominee	Brad Owen	Bill Finkbeiner
Party	Democratic	Republican
Popular vote	1,575,133	1,359,212
Percentage	53.68%	46.32%
- Owen: 50–60% 60–70% 70–80% 80–90% >90% Finkbeiner: 50–60% 60–70% 70–80% 80–90% >90% Tie: 50% No votes
Lieutenant Governor before election
Brad Owen
Democratic
Elected Lieutenant Governor
Brad Owen
Democratic

The 2012 Washington lieutenant gubernatorial election was held on November 6, 2012. The top-two primary was held on August 7. Washington is one of two states that holds a top-two primary, meaning that all candidates are listed on the same ballot regardless of party affiliation, and the top two move on to the general election.

Incumbent Democratic lieutenant governor Brad Owen, first elected to the office in 1996, was re-elected to his fifth and final term, defeating Republican former state Senator Bill Finkbeiner.

== Candidates ==
=== Democratic Party ===
==== Advanced to general ====
- Brad Owen, incumbent lieutenant governor (1997–2017)

=== Republican Party ===
==== Advanced to general ====
- Bill Finkbeiner, former state senator (1995–2007)

==== Eliminated in primary ====
- Glenn Anderson, state representative (2001–2013)

=== Third-party and independent candidates ===
==== Eliminated in primary ====
- Jimmy Deal (Independent)
- Clifford Mark Greene (Independent), perennial candidate
- Dave T. Sumner IV (Independent)

== Primary election ==
=== Endorsements ===
Brad Owen (D)

Newspapers

- The Seattle Times

=== Results ===
County results Owen: 30–40%; 40–50%; 50–60%; Finkbeiner: 30–40%; 40–50%; Anderson: 30–40%; Tie: 30–40%

Congressional district results Owen: 30–40%; 40–50%; 50–60%; 60–70%

Blanket primary results
Party	Candidate	Votes	%
Democratic	Brad Owen (incumbent)	648,110	48.51
Republican	Bill Finkbeiner	352,195	26.36
Independent Republican	Glenn Anderson	229,318	17.17
Independent	Jimmy Deal	53,694	4.02
Independent	Clifford Mark Greene	46,534	3.48
Independent	Dave T. Sumner IV	6,057	0.45
Total votes		1,335,908	100.00

==== By county ====
Combined partisan vote by county Democratic: 40–50%; 50–60%; Republican: 40–50%; 50–60%; 60–70%

Combined partisan vote by congressional district Democratic: 50–60%; 60–70%; Republican: 40–50%; 50–60%

County results
County	Brad Owen Democratic		Bill Finkbeiner Republican		Glenn Anderson Independent Republican		Various candidates Independent		Margin		Total votes
County	#	%	#	%	#	%	#	%	#	%	Total votes
Adams	691	27.75%	915	36.75%	720	28.92%	164	6.59%	-195	-7.83%	2,490
Asotin	1,762	37.47%	1,188	25.27%	1,296	27.56%	456	9.70%	466	9.91%	4,702
Benton	10,768	35.10%	10,039	32.72%	8,137	26.52%	1,733	5.65%	729	2.38%	30,677
Chelan	6,013	36.31%	5,682	34.31%	3,686	22.26%	1,181	7.13%	331	2.00%	16,562
Clallam	9,414	47.54%	5,063	25.57%	4,118	20.80%	1,206	6.09%	4,351	21.97%	19,801
Clark	27,714	41.47%	17,877	26.75%	16,619	24.87%	4,617	6.91%	9,837	14.72%	66,827
Columbia	376	34.62%	294	27.07%	336	30.94%	80	7.37%	40	3.68%	1,086
Cowlitz	8,283	45.65%	3,928	21.65%	4,297	23.68%	1,638	9.03%	3,986	21.97%	18,146
Douglas	2,497	34.30%	2,499	34.33%	1,797	24.68%	487	6.69%	-2	-0.03%	7,280
Ferry	607	36.79%	379	22.97%	536	32.48%	128	7.76%	71	4.30%	1,650
Franklin	2,988	33.38%	3,007	33.59%	2,356	26.32%	601	6.71%	-19	-0.21%	8,952
Garfield	185	32.12%	185	32.12%	157	27.26%	49	8.51%	0	0.00%	576
Grant	3,707	30.91%	4,447	37.08%	2,897	24.16%	942	7.85%	-740	-6.17%	11,993
Grays Harbor	8,490	59.30%	2,496	17.44%	2,296	16.04%	1,034	7.22%	5,994	41.87%	14,316
Island	10,923	47.82%	5,800	25.39%	4,673	20.46%	1,447	6.33%	5,123	22.43%	22,843
Jefferson	6,755	58.33%	2,133	18.42%	1,804	15.58%	889	7.68%	4,622	39.91%	11,581
King	218,975	54.40%	100,421	24.95%	42,994	10.68%	40,148	9.97%	118,554	29.45%	402,538
Kitsap	29,456	50.69%	15,952	27.45%	8,826	15.19%	3,871	6.66%	13,504	23.24%	58,105
Kittitas	3,463	41.79%	2,544	30.70%	1,791	21.61%	488	5.89%	919	11.09%	8,286
Klickitat	1,569	39.31%	1,045	26.18%	1,044	26.16%	333	8.34%	524	13.13%	3,991
Lewis	5,651	36.29%	4,157	26.70%	4,640	29.80%	1,122	7.21%	1,011	6.49%	15,570
Lincoln	1,004	32.69%	1,301	42.36%	608	19.80%	158	5.14%	-297	-9.67%	3,071
Mason	8,693	56.99%	2,959	19.40%	2,505	16.42%	1,097	7.19%	5,734	37.59%	15,254
Okanogan	3,058	37.45%	2,402	29.42%	2,071	25.36%	634	7.76%	656	8.03%	8,165
Pacific	3,185	52.24%	1,067	17.50%	1,316	21.58%	529	8.68%	1,869	30.65%	6,097
Pend Oreille	1,244	36.91%	849	25.19%	957	28.40%	320	9.50%	287	8.52%	3,370
Pierce	69,597	48.34%	40,108	27.86%	24,170	16.79%	10,101	7.02%	29,489	20.48%	143,976
San Juan	2,824	52.23%	1,285	23.77%	877	16.22%	421	7.79%	1,539	28.46%	5,407
Skagit	12,517	46.99%	6,961	26.13%	5,416	20.33%	1,744	6.55%	5,556	20.86%	26,638
Skamania	899	40.99%	526	23.99%	576	26.27%	192	8.76%	323	14.73%	2,193
Snohomish	66,372	49.19%	39,201	29.05%	19,021	14.10%	10,335	7.66%	27,171	20.14%	134,929
Spokane	41,889	43.07%	26,089	26.82%	22,428	23.06%	6,856	7.05%	15,800	16.24%	97,262
Stevens	3,376	32.14%	2,799	26.65%	3,510	33.42%	819	7.80%	-134	-1.28%	10,504
Thurston	32,852	57.39%	12,174	21.27%	8,376	14.63%	3,845	6.72%	20,678	36.12%	57,247
Wahkiakum	548	45.70%	268	22.35%	265	22.10%	118	9.84%	280	23.35%	1,199
Walla Walla	4,553	36.87%	3,991	32.32%	2,897	23.46%	907	7.35%	562	4.55%	12,348
Whatcom	20,276	47.08%	11,940	27.72%	8,131	18.88%	2,720	6.32%	8,336	19.36%	43,067
Whitman	2,749	39.63%	2,032	29.30%	1,664	23.99%	491	7.08%	717	10.34%	6,936
Yakima	12,187	40.26%	6,192	20.45%	9,510	31.41%	2,384	7.88%	2,677	8.84%	30,273
Totals	648,110	48.51%	352,195	26.36%	229,318	17.17%	106,285	7.96%	295,915	22.15%	1,335,908

Counties that flipped from Democratic to Republican

- Asotin (largest city: Clarkston)
- Clark (largest city: Vancouver)
- Kittitas (largest city: Ellensburg)
- Klickitat (largest city: Goldendale)
- Skamania (largest city: Carson)
- Spokane (largest city: Spokane)
- Whitman (largest city: Pullman)

==== By congressional district ====
District	Owen	Finkbeiner	Anderson	Representative
1st	46%	32%	16%	Suzan DelBene
2nd	51%	26%	15%	Rick Larsen
3rd	42%	25%	25%	Jaime Herrera Beutler
4th	36%	29%	28%	Doc Hastings
5th	41%	28%	24%	Cathy McMorris Rodgers
6th	53%	25%	16%	Norm Dicks
7th	61%	20%	6%	Jim McDermott
8th	42%	31%	21%	Dave Reichert
9th	55%	25%	11%	Adam Smith
10th	53%	24%	16%	Denny Heck

== General election ==
=== Polling ===
Poll source	Date(s) administered	Sample size	Margin of error	Brad Owen (D)	Bill Finkbeiner (R)	Undecided
Elway Research	October 18–21, 2012	451 (RV)	± 4.5%	42%	32%	26%
Elway Research	September 9–12, 2012	405 (RV)	± 5.0%	43%	27%	29%

=== Results ===
2012 Washington lieutenant gubernatorial election
Party	Candidate	Votes	%	±%
Democratic	Brad Owen (incumbent)	1,575,133	53.68	–7.12
Republican	Bill Finkbeiner	1,359,212	46.32	+7.12
Total votes		2,934,345	100.00	N/A
Democratic hold				

==== By county ====
County results
County	Brad Owen Democratic		Bill Finkbeiner Republican		Margin		Total votes
County	#	%	#	%	#	%	Total votes
Adams	1,598	35.38%	2,919	64.62%	-1,321	-29.25%	4,517
Asotin	4,187	44.91%	5,137	55.09%	-950	-10.19%	9,324
Benton	30,014	40.01%	44,997	59.99%	-14,983	-19.97%	75,011
Chelan	12,528	41.16%	17,910	58.84%	-5,382	-17.68%	30,438
Clallam	18,887	52.02%	17,419	47.98%	1,468	4.04%	36,306
Clark	87,537	48.77%	91,944	51.23%	-4,407	-2.46%	179,481
Columbia	752	35.69%	1,355	64.31%	-603	-28.62%	2,107
Cowlitz	22,299	52.96%	19,804	47.04%	2,495	5.93%	42,103
Douglas	5,360	37.50%	8,934	62.50%	-3,574	-25.00%	14,294
Ferry	1,373	42.23%	1,878	57.77%	-505	-15.53%	3,251
Franklin	9,085	41.56%	12,775	58.44%	-3,690	-16.88%	21,860
Garfield	450	37.69%	744	62.31%	-294	-24.62%	1,194
Grant	9,435	35.88%	16,860	64.12%	-7,425	-28.24%	26,295
Grays Harbor	17,116	61.79%	10,585	38.21%	6,531	23.58%	27,701
Island	20,046	50.31%	19,797	49.69%	249	0.62%	39,843
Jefferson	11,970	62.98%	7,036	37.02%	4,934	25.96%	19,006
King	529,218	59.24%	364,133	40.76%	165,085	18.48%	893,351
Kitsap	64,669	55.08%	52,741	44.92%	11,928	10.16%	117,410
Kittitas	7,722	45.54%	9,235	54.46%	-1,513	-8.92%	16,957
Klickitat	4,508	46.27%	5,234	53.73%	-726	-7.45%	9,742
Lewis	13,764	42.49%	18,631	57.51%	-4,867	-15.02%	32,395
Lincoln	1,996	35.64%	3,604	64.36%	-1,608	-28.71%	5,600
Mason	16,074	58.92%	11,209	41.08%	4,865	17.83%	27,283
Okanogan	7,272	45.25%	8,798	54.75%	-1,526	-9.50%	16,070
Pacific	5,785	57.68%	4,245	42.32%	1,540	15.35%	10,030
Pend Oreille	2,653	41.85%	3,687	58.15%	-1,034	-16.31%	6,340
Pierce	179,295	55.40%	144,351	44.60%	34,944	10.80%	323,646
San Juan	6,216	62.08%	3,797	37.92%	2,419	24.16%	10,013
Skagit	26,501	50.79%	25,672	49.21%	829	1.59%	52,173
Skamania	2,494	48.84%	2,612	51.16%	-118	-2.31%	5,106
Snohomish	172,154	55.36%	138,836	44.64%	33,318	10.71%	310,990
Spokane	99,673	47.32%	110,978	52.68%	-11,305	-5.37%	210,651
Stevens	7,854	37.04%	13,351	62.96%	-5,497	-25.92%	21,205
Thurston	70,353	58.42%	50,078	41.58%	20,275	16.84%	120,431
Wahkiakum	1,103	51.93%	1,021	48.07%	82	3.86%	2,124
Walla Walla	9,684	41.08%	13,892	58.92%	-4,208	-17.85%	23,576
Whatcom	50,174	51.85%	46,598	48.15%	3,576	3.70%	96,772
Whitman	7,499	46.87%	8,501	53.13%	-1,002	-6.26%	16,000
Yakima	35,835	48.59%	37,914	51.41%	-2,079	-2.82%	73,749
Totals	1,575,133	53.68%	1,359,212	46.32%	215,921	7.36%	2,934,345

Counties that flipped from Democratic to Republican

- Asotin (largest city: Clarkston)
- Clark (largest city: Vancouver)
- Kittitas (largest city: Ellensburg)
- Klickitat (largest city: Goldendale)
- Lewis (largest city: Centralia)
- Okanogan (largest city: Omak)
- Skamania (largest city: Carson)
- Spokane (largest city: Spokane)
- Walla Walla (largest city: Walla Walla)
- Whitman (largest city: Pullman)
- Yakima (largest city: Yakima)

==== By congressional district ====
Owen won six of ten congressional districts.

District	Owen	Finkbeiner	Representative
1st	50.5%	49.5%	Suzan DelBene
2nd	57%	43%	Rick Larsen
3rd	49%	51%	Jaime Herrera Beutler
4th	42%	58%	Doc Hastings
5th	46%	54%	Cathy McMorris Rodgers
6th	58%	42%	Derek Kilmer
7th	63%	37%	Jim McDermott
8th	49%	51%	Dave Reichert
9th	62%	38%	Adam Smith
10th	57%	43%	Denny Heck
