= Phillip TK Yin =

American journalist

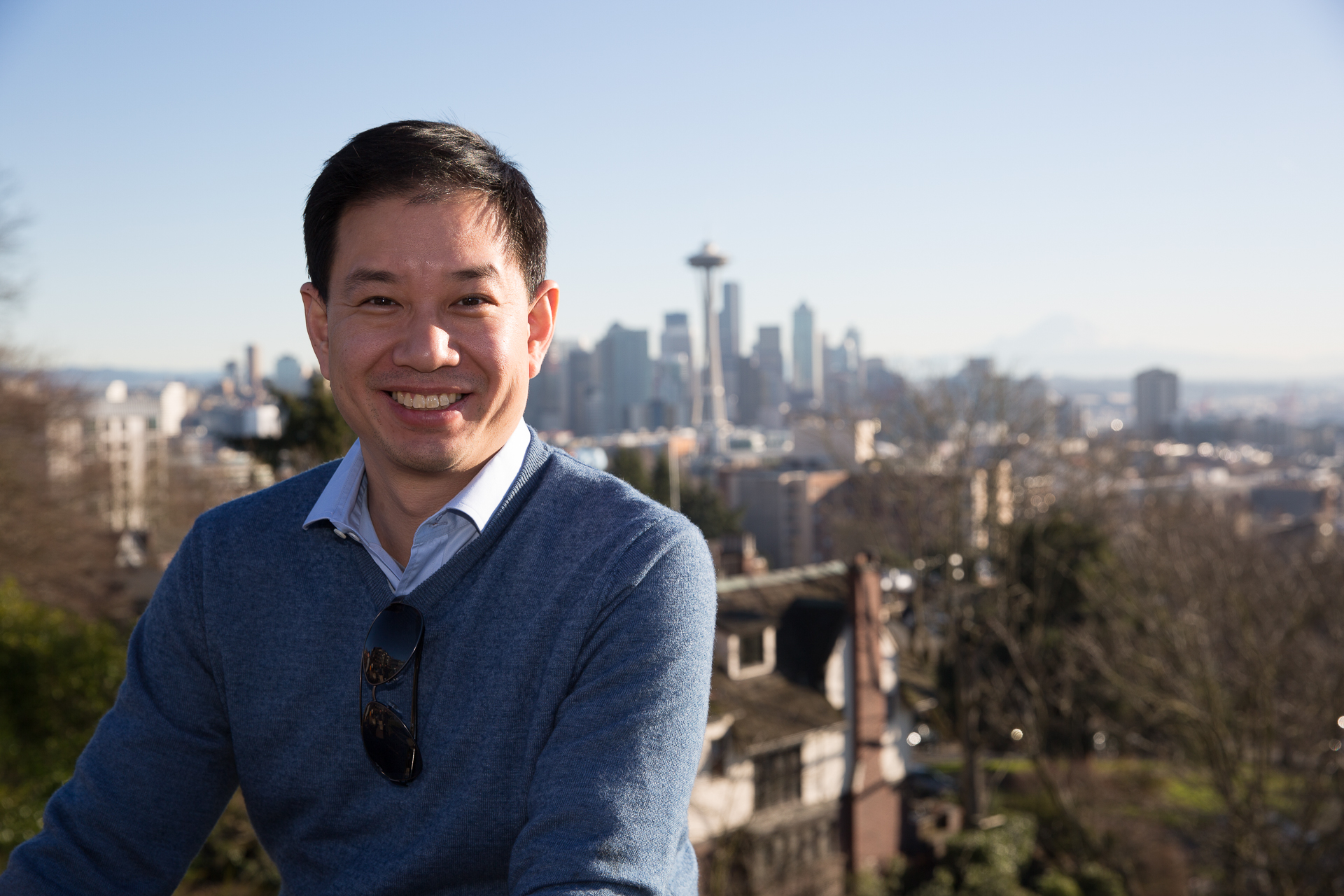
- Born: Mesa, Arizona, U.S.
- Education: McDonough School of Business
- Occupation: Journalist

Phillip TK Yin is a journalist and a communications and corporate partnerships advisor. He is currently an advisor and partner with the American Chamber of Commerce and speaks on U.S. networks, including Fox Business, on current events. He was previously a broadcast business journalist covering topics such as business technology, aviation, and politics for CNBC, Bloomberg News and CCTV America.

== Early life and education ==
Yin was born in Mesa, Arizona, but moved to Yakima, Washington a few months later. Yin went to Eisenhower High School in Yakima, where he played tennis.

He holds an International MBA from Georgetown University and an undergraduate business degree from the University of Washington. He also completed a special summer program at Harvard Business School.

== Political activity ==
In 2011, Yin considered running as a Republican and challenging sitting senator Maria Cantwell in the 2012 United States Senate election in Washington State. However, he exited the race due to fundraising concerns.

On January 22, 2016, Yin announced on Sina Weibo that he was running for Lieutenant Governor of Washington. After losing that race he declared for the Bellevue City Council.

== Personal life ==
Yin's parents Eric and Harriet are immigrants from Hong Kong, and he is a native of Washington state. His wife is from Hong Kong, and the two met and fell in love there. Yin has four children, daughters, Kelsey, Katie and Kelly, and son, Kody.
