= 2008 Washington lieutenant gubernatorial election =

- November 4, 2008
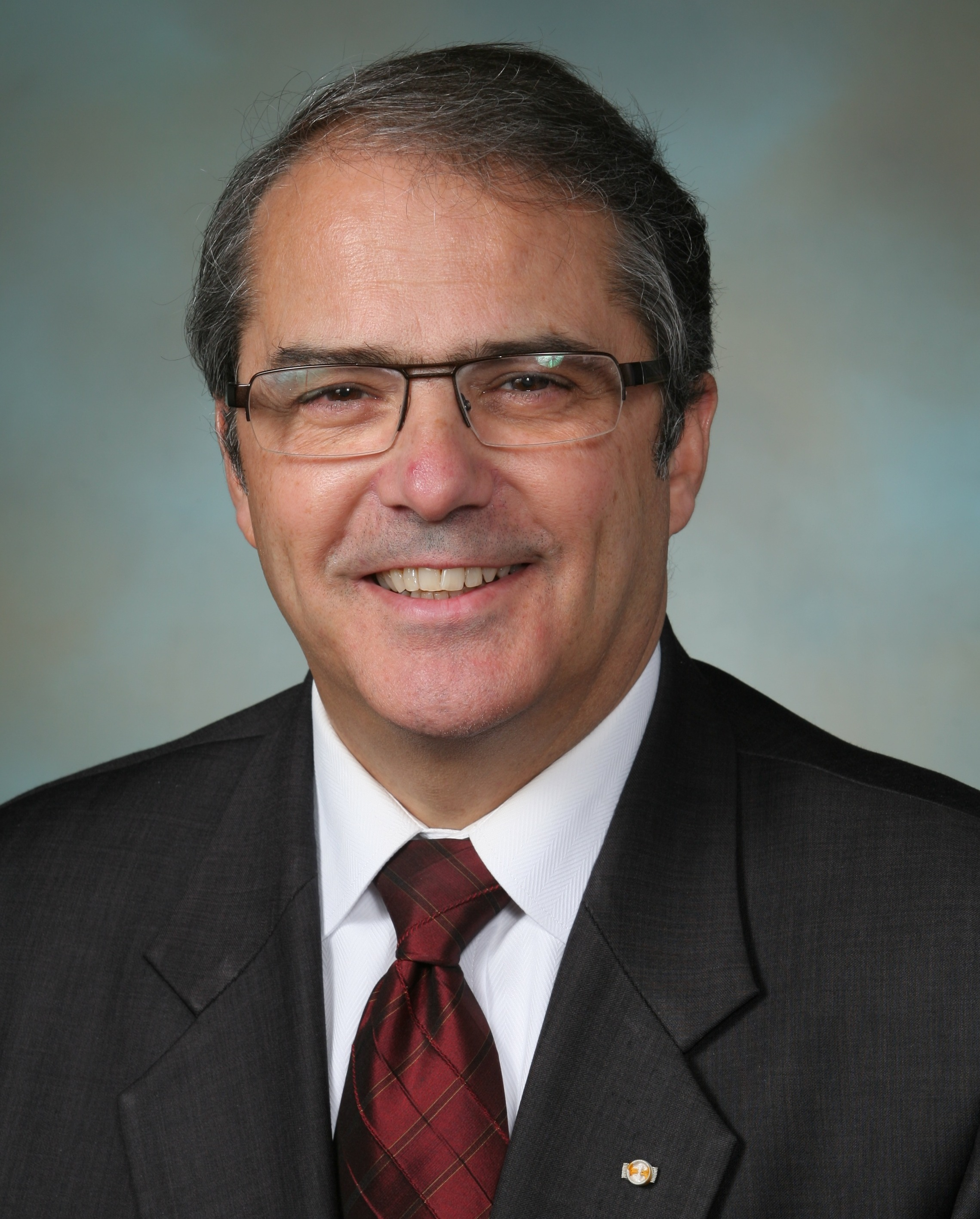

Nominee	Brad Owen	Marcia McCraw
Party	Democratic	Republican
Popular vote	1,718,033	1,107,634
Percentage	60.80%	39.20%
- Owen: 50–60% 60–70% 70–80% McCraw: 50–60%
Lieutenant Governor before election
Brad Owen
Democratic
Elected Lieutenant Governor
Brad Owen
Democratic

The 2008 Washington lieutenant gubernatorial election was held on November 4, 2008. The top-two primary was held on August 19. Washington is one of two states that holds a top-two primary, meaning that all candidates are listed on the same ballot regardless of party affiliation, and the top two move on to the general election.

Incumbent Democratic lieutenant governor Brad Owen, first elected to the office in 1996, was re-elected to a fourth term in office, defeating Republican attorney Marcia McCraw in a landslide.

== Candidates ==
=== Democratic Party ===
==== Advanced to general ====
- Brad Owen, incumbent lieutenant governor (1997–2017)

==== Eliminated in primary ====
- Randel Bell

=== Republican Party ===
==== Advanced to general ====
- Marcia McCraw, attorney

==== Eliminated in primary ====
- Jim Wiest, former state worker

=== Third-party and independent candidates ===
==== Eliminated in primary ====
- Arlene A. Peck (Constitution)

== Primary election ==
=== Endorsements ===
Brad Owen (D)

Newspapers

- The Seattle Times (co-endorsement with McCraw)
Marcia McCraw (R)

Newspapers

- The Seattle Times (co-endorsement with Owen)

=== Results ===
County results Owen: 30–40%; 40–50%; 50–60%; 60–70%; McCraw: 30–40%

Congressional district results Owen: 30–40%; 40–50%; 50–60%; 60–70%

Blanket primary results
Party	Candidate	Votes	%
Democratic	Brad Owen (incumbent)	706,641	52.08
Republican	Marcia McCraw	347,551	25.62
Republican	Jim Wiest	193,752	14.28
Democratic	Randel Bell	59,890	4.41
Constitution	Arlene A. Peck	48,887	3.60
Total votes		1,356,721	100.00

Counties that flipped from Democratic to Republican

- Pend Oreille (largest city: Newport)

Counties that flipped from Republican to Democratic

- Klickitat (largest city: Goldendale)
- Whitman (largest city: Pullman)

==== By congressional district ====
District	Owen	McCraw	Wiest	Representative
1st	56%	25%	12%	Jay Inslee
2nd	51%	28%	14%	Rick Larsen
3rd	51%	23%	17%	Brian Baird
4th	40%	35%	18%	Doc Hastings
5th	44%	27%	20%	Cathy McMorris Rodgers
6th	57%	23%	12%	Norm Dicks
7th	70%	13%	6%	Jim McDermott
8th	50%	29%	15%	Dave Reichert
9th	54%	26%	13%	Adam Smith

== General election ==
=== Post-primary endorsements ===
Marcia McCraw (R)

Newspapers

- The Seattle Times

=== Results ===
2008 Washington lieutenant gubernatorial election
Party	Candidate	Votes	%	±%
Democratic	Brad Owen (incumbent)	1,718,033	60.80	+6.41
Republican	Marcia McCraw	1,107,634	39.20	+0.77
Total votes		2,825,667	100.00	N/A
Democratic hold				

==== By county ====
County results
County	Brad Owen Democratic		Marcia McCraw Republican		Margin		Total votes
County	#	%	#	%	#	%	Total votes
Adams	1,984	44.18%	2,507	55.82%	-523	-11.65%	4,491
Asotin	4,656	50.57%	4,551	49.43%	105	1.14%	9,207
Benton	31,815	46.09%	37,218	53.91%	-5,403	-7.83%	69,033
Chelan	14,158	47.33%	15,753	52.67%	-1,595	-5.33%	29,911
Clallam	21,519	58.92%	15,003	41.08%	6,516	17.84%	36,522
Clark	94,611	55.35%	76,323	44.65%	18,288	10.70%	170,934
Columbia	978	47.11%	1,098	52.89%	-120	-5.78%	2,076
Cowlitz	25,234	59.35%	17,280	40.65%	7,954	18.71%	42,514
Douglas	6,370	45.01%	7,783	54.99%	-1,413	-9.98%	14,153
Ferry	1,600	49.06%	1,661	50.94%	-61	-1.87%	3,261
Franklin	8,967	47.60%	9,873	52.40%	-906	-4.81%	18,840
Garfield	578	45.66%	688	54.34%	-110	-8.69%	1,266
Grant	11,153	42.98%	14,797	57.02%	-3,644	-14.04%	25,950
Grays Harbor	19,540	70.04%	8,360	29.96%	11,180	40.07%	27,900
Island	22,150	56.36%	17,149	43.64%	5,001	12.73%	39,299
Jefferson	13,192	69.64%	5,750	30.36%	7,442	39.29%	18,942
King	564,821	67.63%	270,379	32.37%	294,442	35.25%	835,200
Kitsap	72,170	61.21%	45,728	38.79%	26,442	22.43%	117,898
Kittitas	8,871	52.98%	7,874	47.02%	997	5.95%	16,745
Klickitat	5,178	54.61%	4,304	45.39%	874	9.22%	9,482
Lewis	16,517	50.75%	16,032	49.25%	485	1.49%	32,549
Lincoln	2,712	49.10%	2,811	50.90%	-99	-1.79%	5,523
Mason	18,544	67.78%	8,817	32.22%	9,727	35.55%	27,361
Okanogan	8,159	52.05%	7,516	47.95%	643	4.10%	15,675
Pacific	6,708	65.04%	3,605	34.96%	3,103	30.09%	10,313
Pend Oreille	2,984	48.32%	3,192	51.68%	-208	-3.37%	6,176
Pierce	186,013	60.13%	123,353	39.87%	62,660	20.25%	309,366
San Juan	6,863	69.00%	3,084	31.00%	3,779	37.99%	9,947
Skagit	30,861	58.81%	21,613	41.19%	9,248	17.62%	52,474
Skamania	2,886	57.02%	2,175	42.98%	711	14.05%	5,061
Snohomish	185,108	61.42%	116,276	38.58%	68,832	22.84%	301,384
Spokane	114,233	55.15%	92,910	44.85%	21,323	10.29%	207,143
Stevens	9,327	44.64%	11,566	55.36%	-2,239	-10.72%	20,893
Thurston	80,063	67.25%	38,995	32.75%	41,068	34.49%	119,058
Wahkiakum	1,185	56.03%	930	43.97%	255	12.06%	2,115
Walla Walla	11,657	50.56%	11,401	49.44%	256	1.11%	23,058
Whatcom	56,318	59.79%	37,879	40.21%	18,439	19.57%	94,197
Whitman	9,034	56.01%	7,096	43.99%	1,938	12.01%	16,130
Yakima	39,316	53.40%	34,304	46.60%	5,012	6.81%	73,620
Totals	1,718,033	60.80%	1,107,634	39.20%	610,399	21.60%	2,825,667

Counties that flipped from Republican to Democratic

- Asotin (largest city: Clarkston)
- Klickitat (largest city: Goldendale)
- Lewis (largest city: Centralia)
- Okanogan (largest city: Omak)
- Spokane (largest city: Spokane)
- Walla Walla (largest city: Walla Walla)
- Whitman (largest city: Pullman)
- Yakima (largest city: Yakima)

==== By congressional district ====
Owen won eight of nine congressional districts, including two that elected Republicans.

District	Owen	McCraw	Representative
1st	64%	36%	Jay Inslee
2nd	59%	41%	Rick Larsen
3rd	59%	41%	Brian Baird
4th	49%	51%	Doc Hastings
5th	53%	47%	Cathy McMorris Rodgers
6th	65%	35%	Norm Dicks
7th	75%	25%	Jim McDermott
8th	58%	42%	Dave Reichert
9th	63%	37%	Adam Smith
