= Brad Owen =

Lieutenant governor of Washington from 1997 to 2017

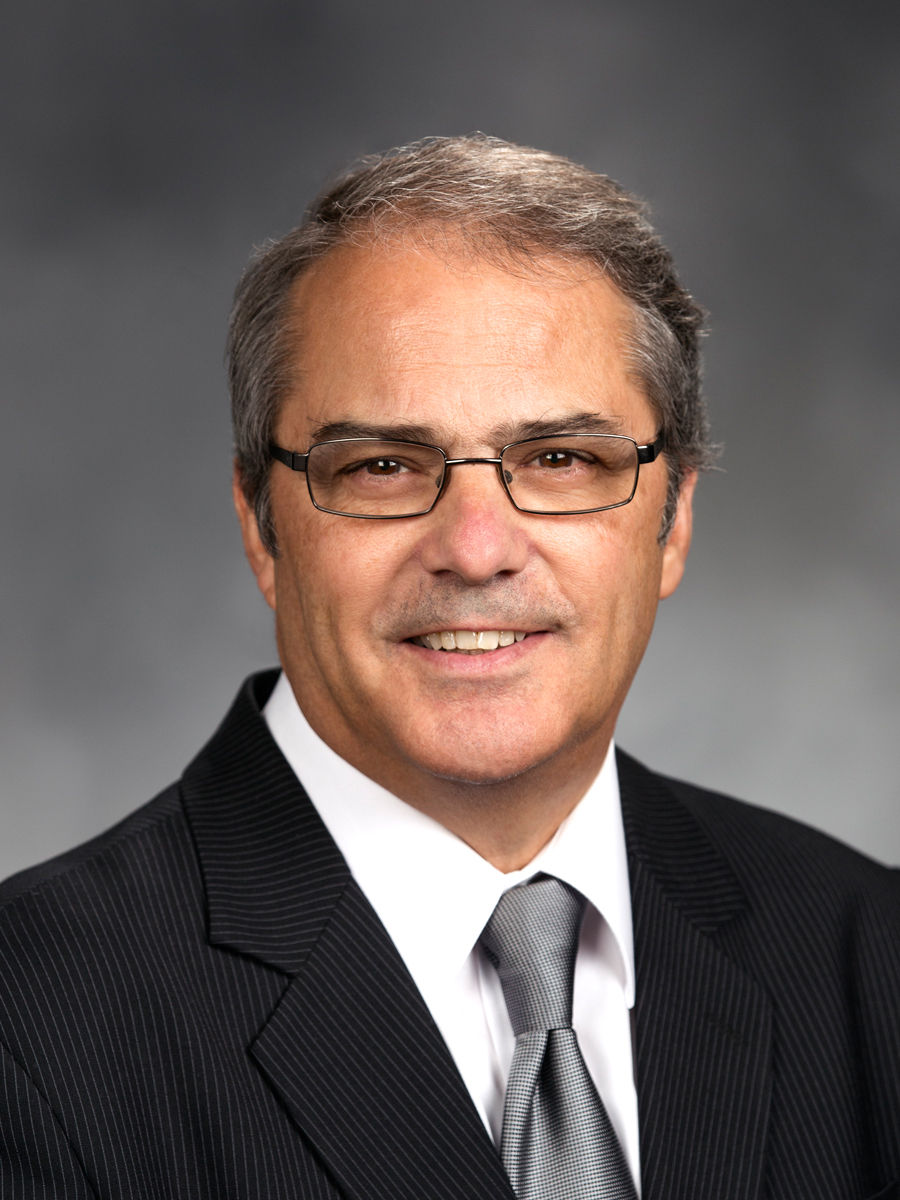
- Official portrait, 2014

15th Lieutenant Governor of Washington
- In office January 15, 1997 – January 11, 2017
- Governor: Gary Locke; Christine Gregoire; Jay Inslee
- Preceded by: Joel Pritchard
- Succeeded by: Cyrus Habib

Member of the Washington Senate from the 35th district
- In office January 10, 1983 – January 15, 1997
- Preceded by: Ruthe Ridder
- Succeeded by: Lena Swanson

Member of the Washington House of Representatives from the 24th district
- In office January 10, 1977 – January 10, 1983
- Preceded by: Leona Savage Osterman
- Succeeded by: Richard Fisch

Personal details
- Born: Bradley Scott Owen; May 23, 1950 (age 76) Tacoma, Washington, U.S.
- Party: Democratic
- Spouse: Linda Owen
- Children: 6
- Website: Government website

Bradley Scott Owen (born May 23, 1950) is an American businessman and politician who served as the 15th lieutenant governor of Washington from 1997 to 2017. A member of the Democratic Party, he began his political career in the Washington House of Representatives, where he served from 1977 to 1983, before being elected to the Washington State Senate, serving from 1983 to 1997.

== Biography ==
Bradley Scott Owen was born on May 23, 1950, in Tacoma, Washington. He was a small business owner before entering politics. He was elected as Shelton City Finance Commissioner and to the Washington House of Representatives in 1976 and served in those capacities until 1983, when he was elected to the Washington State Senate. In 1989, he formed a non-profit organization called Strategies for Youth, first as a way to fight substance abuse among Washington's young people and later with a greater emphasis on bullying and respecting diversity. The program concluded in 2011.

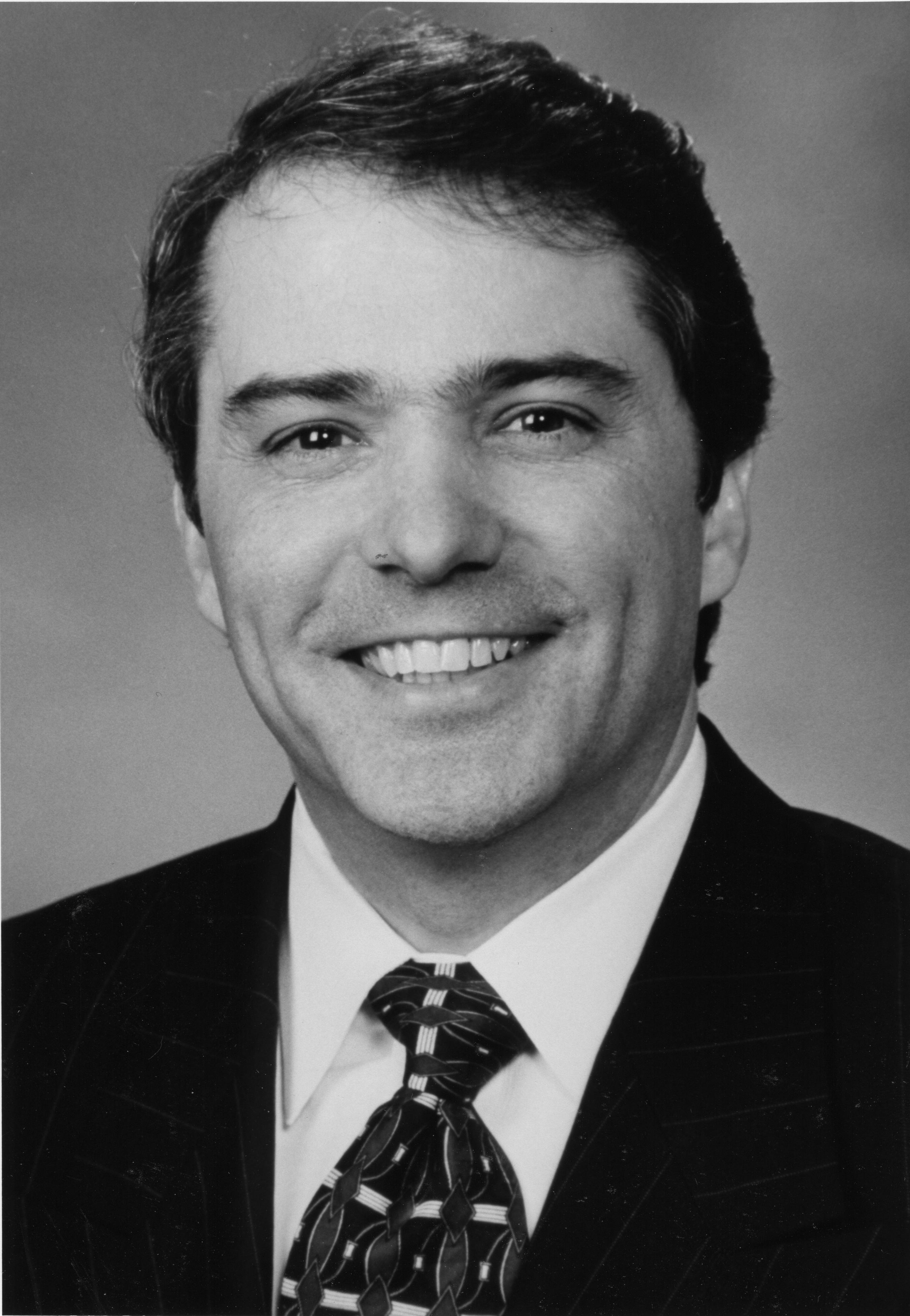
Owen in 2000

In 1996, Owen moved from the legislature to the executive branch with his election as lieutenant governor. He was re-elected to that position in 2000, 2004, 2008, and 2012. Following findings by the state's Executive Ethics Commission that Owen improperly used tax-payer resources, which led to a $15,000 fine being imposed against him, Owen announced that he would not seek another term in the 2016 election. Prior to that announcement, three current legislators from his own party had already begun campaigning for his office. His final term expired in January 2017. He was succeeded in office by Cyrus Habib.

Owen is opposed to abortion, campaigns against drug use and drug legalization and is described as "lukewarm" on gay rights. He has received criticism for his work ethic, not working outside of the legislative calendar, conducting remote work and prioritizing his outside business interests ahead of his duties as Lieutenant Governor. In September 2014, he was fined $15,000 for breaking state law by using state resources to run Strategies for Youth, his personal non-profit group.

On April 2, 2008, the King of Spain Juan Carlos I bestowed the Order of Isabella the Catholic, or Spanish knighthood, on Owen.

== Electoral history ==
Washington House of Representatives 24th District, Position 2 Democratic Primary Election, 1976
| Party | Candidate | Votes | % |
| Democratic | Brad Owen | 9,010 | 51.73 |
| Democratic | Leona Savage Osterman (inc.) | 8,408 | 48.27 |

Washington House of Representatives 24th District, Position 2 Election, 1976
| Party | Candidate | Votes | % |
| Democratic | Brad Owen | 22,042 | 62.94 |
| Republican | Irene Conca | 12,979 | 37.06 |

Washington House of Representatives 24th District, Position 1 Election, 1978
| Party | Candidate | Votes | % |
| Democratic | Brad Owen (inc.) | 18,563 | 100.00 |

Washington House of Representatives 24th District, Position 1 Election, 1980
| Party | Candidate | Votes | % |
| Democratic | Brad Owen (inc.) | 26,506 | 60.51 |
| Republican | Philip Sutherland | 17,301 | 39.49 |

Washington State Senate 35th District Democratic Primary Election, 1982
| Party | Candidate | Votes | % |
| Democratic | Brad Owen | 9,685 | 65.07 |
| Democratic | Joyce Jaros | 5,200 | 34.93 |

Washington State Senate 35th District Election, 1982
| Party | Candidate | Votes | % |
| Democratic | Brad Owen | 18,883 | 67.01 |
| Republican | Marlin Cronquist | 9,295 | 32.99 |

Washington State Senate 35th District Democratic Primary Election, 1986
| Party | Candidate | Votes | % |
| Democratic | Brad Owen (inc.) | 8,943 | 67.10 |
| Democratic | Edward Leaf | 3,088 | 23.17 |
| Democratic | Daniel Sanford | 1,297 | 9.73 |

Washington State Senate 35th District Election, 1986
| Party | Candidate | Votes | % |
| Democratic | Brad Owen (inc.) | 19,150 | 70.26 |
| Republican | Wayne Estes | 8,107 | 29.74 |

Washington State Senate 35th District Democratic Primary Election, 1990
| Party | Candidate | Votes | % |
| Democratic | Brad Owen (inc.) | 8,681 | 57.19 |
| Democratic | Dan Scott | 6,499 | 42.81 |

Washington State Senate 35th District Election, 1990
| Party | Candidate | Votes | % |
| Democratic | Brad Owen (inc.) | 16,749 | 61.54 |
| Republican | David Wood | 10,467 | 38.46 |

Washington State Senate 35 District Election, 1994
| Party | Candidate | Votes | % |
| Democratic | Brad Owen (inc.) | 24,265 | 67.40 |
| Republican | Meta Heller | 11,736 | 32.60 |

Washington Lieutenant Governor Democratic Primary Election, 1996
| Party | Candidate | Votes | % |
| Democratic | Brad Owen | 242,757 | 40.24 |
| Democratic | Paull Shin | 235,461 | 39.03 |
| Democratic | Bob Owen | 44,510 | 7.38 |
| Democratic | Bambi Lichtman | 34,326 | 5.69 |
| Democratic | Frank Gavaldon | 32,658 | 5.41 |
| Democratic | Harvey Billmaier | 13,613 | 2.26 |

Washington Lieutenant Governor Election, 1996
| Party | Candidate | Votes | % |
| Democratic | Brad Owen | 1,022,878 | 48.02 |
| Republican | Ann Anderson | 989,661 | 46.46 |
| Reform | Shawn Newman | 78,510 | 3.69 |
| Libertarian | Art Rathjen | 39,277 | 1.84 |

Washington Lieutenant Governor Democratic Primary Election, 2000
| Party | Candidate | Votes | % |
| Democratic | Brad Owen (inc.) | 502,523 | 79.33 |
| Democratic | Lonnie Williams, Sr. | 129,966 | 20.55 |

Washington Lieutenant Governor Election, 2000
| Party | Candidate | Votes | % |
| Democratic | Brad Owen (inc.) | 1,247,838 | 54.25 |
| Republican | Wm. "Mike" Elliott | 872,853 | 37.95 |
| Libertarian | Ruth Bennett | 179,567 | 7.81 |

Washington Lieutenant Governor Election, 2004
| Party | Candidate | Votes | % |
| Democratic | Brad Owen (inc.) | 1,443,505 | 54.39 |
| Republican | Jim Wiest | 1,019,790 | 38.43 |
| Libertarian | Jocelyn Langlois | 117,147 | 4.41 |
| Green | Bern Haggerty | 73,328 | 2.76 |

Washington Lieutenant Governor Primary Election, 2008
| Party | Candidate | Votes | % |
| Democratic | Brad Owen (inc.) | 706,641 | 52.08 |
| Republican | Marcia McCraw | 347,551 | 25.62 |
| Republican | Jim Wiest | 193,752 | 14.28 |
| Democratic | Randel Bell | 59,890 | 4.41 |
| Constitution | Arlene Peck | 48,887 | 3.60 |

Washington Lieutenant Governor Election, 2008
| Party | Candidate | Votes | % |
| Democratic | Brad Owen (inc.) | 1,718,033 | 60.80 |
| Republican | Marcia McCraw | 1,107,634 | 39.20 |

Washington Lieutenant Governor Primary Election, 2012
| Party | Candidate | Votes | % |
| Democratic | Brad Owen (inc.) | 648,110 | 48.51 |
| Republican | Bill Finkbeiner | 325,195 | 26.36 |
| Independent Republican | Glenn Anderson | 229,318 | 17.17 |
| Independent | James Robert Deal | 53,694 | 4.02 |
| Democracy Independent | Mark Greene | 46,534 | 3.48 |
| Neopopulist | Dave Sumner, IV | 6,057 | 0.45 |

Washington Lieutenant Governor Election, 2012
| Party | Candidate | Votes | % |
| Democratic | Brad Owen (inc.) | 1,575,133 | 53.68 |
| Republican | Bill Finkbeiner | 1,359,212 | 46.32 |

Political offices
| Preceded by Joel Pritchard | Lieutenant Governor of Washington; 1997–2017 | Succeeded by Cyrus Habib |
