= 1896 Washington gubernatorial election =

- November 3, 1896
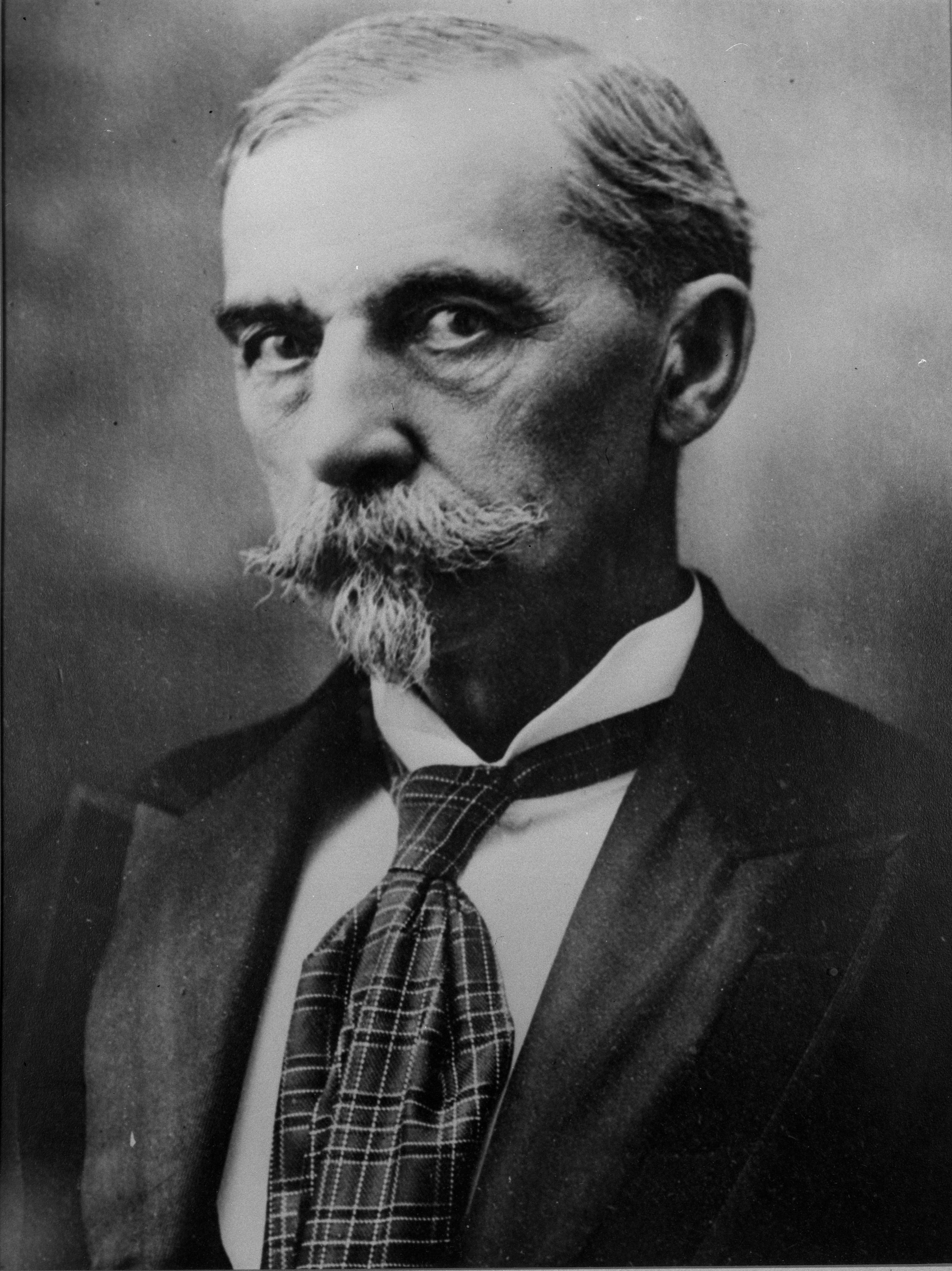

Nominee	John Rankin Rogers	Potter C. "Charley" Sullivan
Party	Populist	Republican
Alliance	Parties: Democratic; Silver Republican
Popular vote	50,849	38,154
Percentage	55.55%	41.68%
- County results Rogers: 40–50% 50–60% 60–70% 70–80% Sullivan: 40–50% 50–60%
Governor before election
John McGraw
Republican
Elected Governor
John Rankin Rogers
Populist

The 1896 Washington gubernatorial election was held on November 3, 1896.

Populist nominee John Rankin Rogers defeated Republican nominee Charley Sullivan, with 55.55% of the vote. In this statewide election, including for all other state officers such as Lieutenant Governor, the Democrats fused with the Populists, except for the presidential election where the Democratic Party ran an independent slate of electors. This alliance would formally merge as the Democratic Party for the next election.

== General election ==
=== Candidates ===
Major party candidates

- John Rankin Rogers, Populist, state senator
- Potter C. "Charley" Sullivan, Republican

Other candidates

- Robert E. Dunlap, Prohibition

=== Results ===
1896 Washington gubernatorial election
Party	Candidate	Votes	%	±%
Populist	John Rankin Rogers	50,849	55.55%	+29.09%
Republican	Potter C. "Charley" Sullivan	38,154	41.68%	+4.72%
Prohibition	Robert E. Dunlap	2,542	2.78%	−1.61%
Majority		12,695	13.87%	+9.06%
Total votes		91,545	100.00%	
Populist gain from Republican		Swing	+24.38%	

=== Results by county ===
County	John R. Rogers Populist		P. C. Sullivan Republican		Robert E. Dunlap Prohibition		Margin		Total votes cast
County	#	%	#	%	#	%	#	%	Total votes cast
Adams	366	59.32%	238	38.57%	13	2.11%	128	20.75%	617
Asotin	249	52.31%	219	46.01%	8	1.68%	30	6.30%	476
Chehalis	1,341	51.70%	1,205	46.45%	48	1.85%	136	5.24%	2,594
Clallam	680	53.80%	572	45.25%	12	0.95%	108	8.54%	1,264
Clark	1,492	48.95%	1,409	46.23%	147	4.82%	83	2.72%	3,048
Columbia	838	51.54%	766	47.11%	22	1.35%	72	4.43%	1,626
Cowlitz	911	47.87%	936	49.19%	56	2.94%	-25	-1.31%	1,903
Douglas	715	66.95%	346	32.40%	7	0.66%	369	34.55%	1,068
Franklin	99	66.89%	45	30.41%	4	2.70%	54	36.49%	148
Garfield	490	56.19%	367	42.09%	15	1.72%	123	14.11%	872
Island	179	44.64%	201	50.12%	21	5.24%	-22	-5.49%	401
Jefferson	497	40.80%	707	58.05%	14	1.15%	-210	-17.24%	1,218
King	7,249	52.16%	6,269	45.11%	379	2.73%	980	7.05%	13,897
Kitsap	704	48.79%	692	47.96%	47	3.26%	12	0.83%	1,443
Kittitas	1,287	54.72%	988	42.01%	77	3.27%	299	12.71%	2,352
Klickitat	678	43.74%	864	55.74%	8	0.52%	-186	-12.00%	1,550
Lewis	1,564	48.21%	1,490	45.93%	190	5.86%	74	2.28%	3,244
Lincoln	1,630	64.94%	816	32.51%	64	2.55%	814	32.43%	2,510
Mason	659	61.94%	365	34.30%	40	3.76%	294	27.63%	1,064
Okanogan	891	72.50%	324	26.36%	14	1.14%	567	46.14%	1,229
Pacific	585	39.55%	848	57.34%	46	3.11%	-263	-17.78%	1,479
Pierce	5,383	53.47%	4,495	44.65%	189	1.88%	888	8.82%	10,067
San Juan	277	39.91%	392	56.48%	25	3.60%	-115	-16.57%	694
Skagit	1,615	55.98%	1,206	41.80%	64	2.22%	409	14.18%	2,885
Skamania	236	62.93%	132	35.20%	7	1.87%	104	27.73%	375
Snohomish	2,707	58.04%	1,846	39.58%	111	2.38%	861	18.46%	4,664
Spokane	5,486	64.45%	2,697	31.68%	329	3.87%	2,789	32.77%	8,512
Stevens	1,774	75.62%	537	22.89%	35	1.49%	1,237	52.73%	2,346
Thurston	1,375	56.03%	970	39.53%	109	4.44%	405	16.50%	2,454
Wahkiakum	382	57.10%	280	41.85%	7	1.05%	102	15.25%	669
Walla Walla	1,691	51.40%	1,538	46.75%	61	1.85%	153	4.65%	3,290
Whatcom	2,116	50.69%	1,885	45.16%	173	4.14%	231	5.53%	4,174
Whitman	3,457	66.06%	1,601	30.59%	175	3.34%	1,856	35.47%	5,233
Yakima	1,246	57.18%	908	41.67%	25	1.15%	338	15.51%	2,179
Totals	50,849	55.55%	38,154	41.68%	2,542	2.78%	12,695	13.87%	91,545

==== Counties that flipped from Republican to Populist ====
- Adams
- Asotin
- Clallam
- Garfield
- King
- Lewis
- Mason
- Okanogan
- Skagit
- Spokane
- Stevens
- Wahkiakum
- Whitman

==== Counties that flipped from Democratic to Populist ====
- Chehalis
- Clark
- Columbia
- Franklin
- Kittitas
- Lincoln
- Pierce
- Skamania
- Thurston
- Walla Walla
- Yakima

==== Counties that flipped from Democratic to Republican ====
- Jefferson
