= Citizens Party of the United States =

- Chairperson: Michael Thompson
- Founded: November 2, 2004
- Headquarters: Philadelphia, Pennsylvania
- Ideology: Economic nationalism
- Political position: Center-left
- Colors: Purple, gray, red, white, and blue
- Seats in the Senate: 0 / 100
- Seats in the House: 0 / 435
- Governorships: 0 / 50
- State Upper House Seats: 0 / 1,972
- State Lower House Seats: 0 / 5,411
- Other elected offices: 0 / 5,411

Website
- http://www.votecitizens.org

The Citizens Party of the United States (Citizens Party) is a political party in the United States. Founded by Michael Thompson in Wayne, Pennsylvania in 2004 as the New American Independent Party (NAIP), the first meeting took place in Valley Forge, Pennsylvania on the day of the general election. The New American Independent Party changed its name to the Citizens Party in January 2011. The transition to the name Citizens Party lasted several months.

== Ideology ==
=== Member engagement ===
Citizens can submit questions and vote on questions through social media that all Citizens Party presidential candidates are required to answer before the convention. Members of the public can suggest potential candidates and draft candidates to run as party candidates.

=== Main Street Platform ===
As can be seen in its 2012 platform, the Citizens Party advocates for an end to US participation in the World Trade Organization, Central American Free Trade Agreement and North American Free Trade Agreement. In addition to eliminating the trade and budget deficits, the party aims to fund and evangelize American manufacturing while introducing financial penalties for companies that outsource it. Part of its plan to invest in American infrastructure includes research and development efforts with an emphasis on renewable energy and natural gas. Specifically, it opposes fracking and hopes to make all drilling operations subject to environmental assessments.

The Citizens Party's strategy against corruption includes auditing of the Federal Reserve, bans on various lobbying activities and reviving the Glass–Steagall Act in order to eliminate bailouts based on a "too big to fail" mentality. Groups in need of assistance according to its platform include veterans, family farmers and the long-term unemployed. The platform also mentions health care reform, more affordable education and a simplified tax code. Stricter immigration laws feature prominently in the party's approach, including limits on H1B and L1 visas and deterrents for companies that hire illegal workers. Regarding foreign policy, the Citizens Party claims to have a non-partisan stance on the Israeli / Palestinian conflict. It aims to limit the use of the military to non-interventionist deployments that directly benefit American national security. The party supports same-sex marriage, the second amendment, and Roe v. Wade. It was an early supporter of organic foods and industrial hemp.

== Candidates ==
The Citizens Party encourages members to start draft campaigns to convince qualified individuals to run for office as Citizens Party candidates.

=== Citizens Questions ===
The Citizens Party requires all of its declared presidential candidates to answer a set of "Citizens Questions" at least 60 days before the 2016 Citizens Party National Convention. The "Citizens Questions" are selected from questions submitted by Citizens Party members via the party website or YouTube. The party states that the responses to the "Citizens Questions" will be posted on the internet for the public to view.

== Previous candidates (2006–2012) ==
In 2006, Michael Thompson ran as the party's first candidate when he ran for State Representative in Pennsylvania's 165th Legislative District and received 2.84% of the vote.

In March 2008, the New American Independent Party nominated Frank McEnulty as its first presidential candidate. In July, McEnulty also became the vice-presidential nominee of the Reform Party. He continued his campaign as the NAIP presidential nominee in states where the Reform Party was unable to obtain ballot status. McEnulty received 828 votes (placing 15th of 23 ballot-qualified Presidential tickets nationwide) as the New American Independent Party nominee and 481 votes on the Reform Party ticket (placing 22nd out of 23 ballot-qualified Presidential tickets nationwide).

In October 2009, the NAIP endorsed independent candidate Chris Daggett for Governor of New Jersey. Daggett finished third with 6% of the vote.

The Citizens Party did not nominate a presidential ticket in 2012 and ran no candidates nationwide, they have not nominated a presidential ticket since 2009.
