= 1972 Washington gubernatorial election =

- November 7, 1972
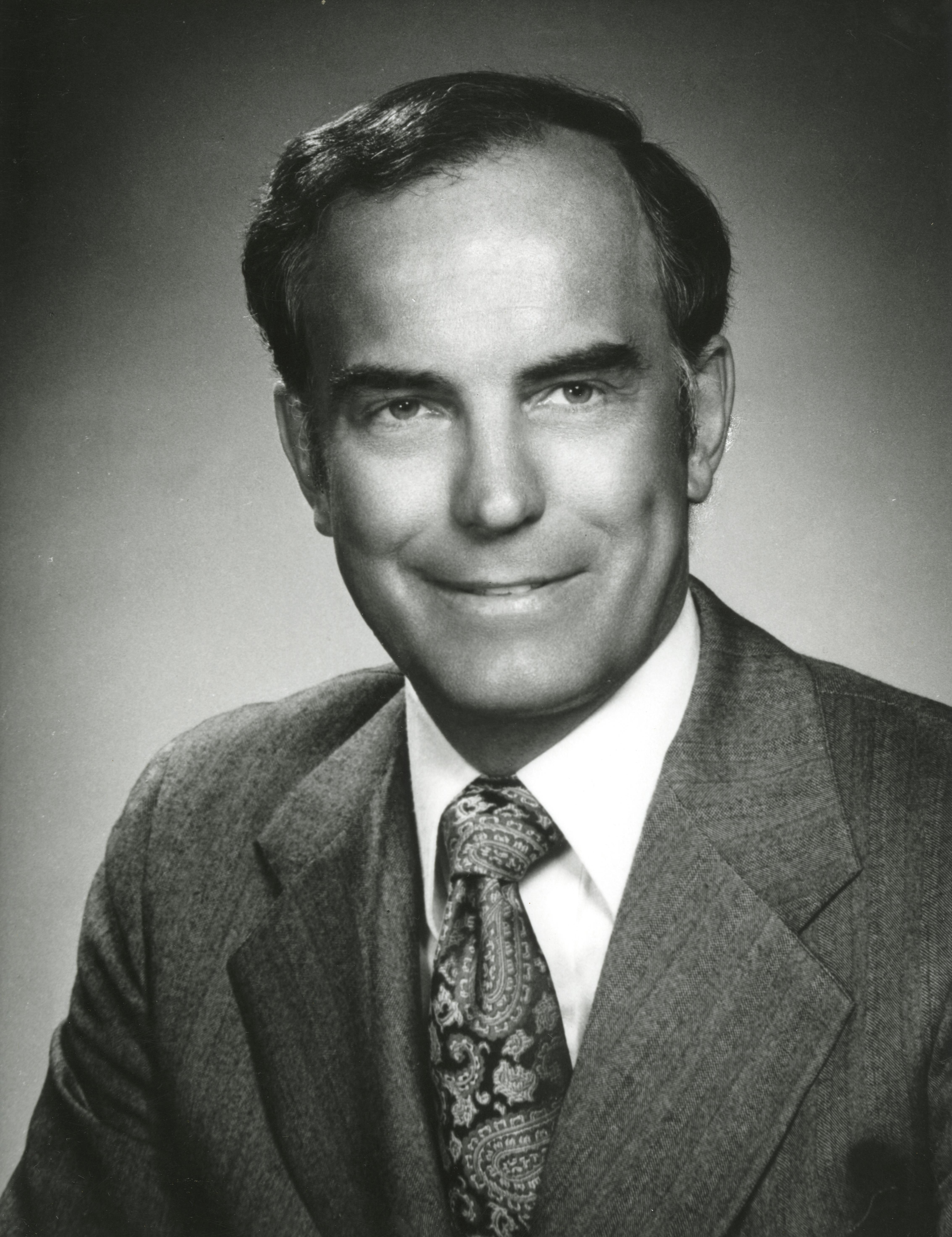

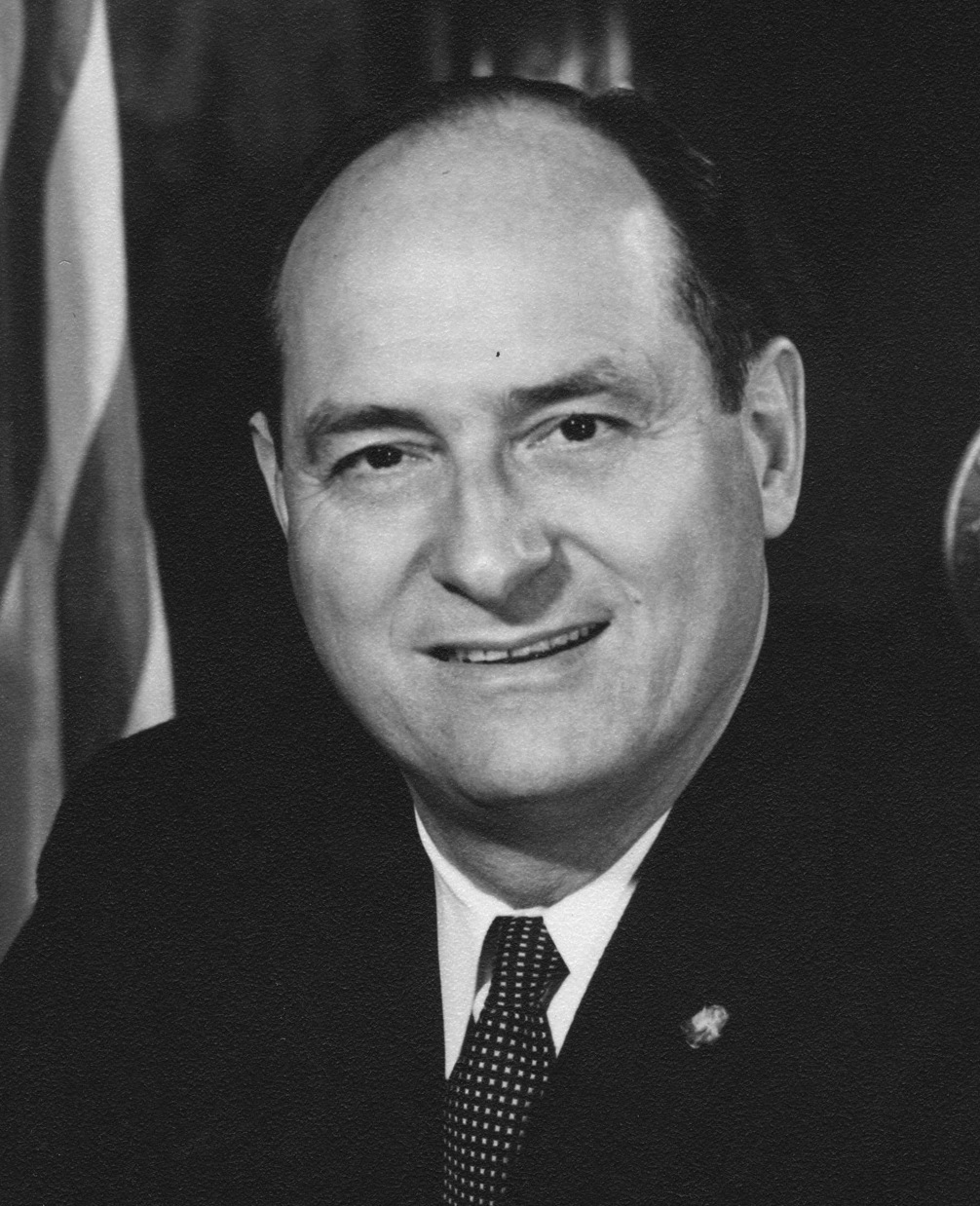

Nominee	Daniel J. Evans	Albert Rosellini	Vick Gould
Party	Republican	Democratic	Taxpayers
Popular vote	747,825	630,613	86,843
Percentage	50.78%	42.82%	5.90%
- County results Evans: 40–50% 50–60% 60–70% Rosellini: 40–50% 50–60% 60–70%
Governor before election
Daniel J. Evans
Republican
Elected Governor
Daniel J. Evans
Republican

The 1972 Washington gubernatorial election was held on November 7, 1972. Incumbent Governor of Washington Daniel J. Evans, who was first elected eight years earlier, and then re-elected in 1968, was eligible for re-election, as Washington does not have gubernatorial term limits.

On election day, Evans defeated former governor Albert D. Rosellini by a comfortable margin of 117,212 votes, in a rematch of the 1964 contest. Businessman Vick Gould, who ran with the Taxpayers Party, a third party of Gould's own creation, also received 5.9% of the vote. Evans was the first governor of Washington to be elected to a third consecutive term. (Note: Arthur B. Langlie had previously served three non-consecutive terms, having lost his first reelection bid in 1944.)

== Primary election ==
A total of nine candidates filed for the blanket primary on September 19, 1972. Evans and Rosellini won their party's nominations, receiving 24.66% and 30.27% of the votes in the primary, respectively.

=== Candidates ===
==== Republican Party ====
- Daniel J. Evans, incumbent governor
- L. R. Kemore, candidate for governor in 1948
- Earl Monaghan
- John "Hugo Frye" Patric, perennial candidate
- Perry B. Woodall, state senator

==== Democratic Party ====
- Martin J. Durkan, state senator
- James A. McDermott, psychiatrist and state representative
- Albert D. Rosellini, former governor
- Rudolfo Valdez

=== Results ===
Results by county Rosellini: 20–30%; 30–40%; 40–50%; Evans: 20–30%; 30–40%; 40–50%; Durkan: 20–30%; 30–40%; Woodall: 30–40%; 40–50%

Blanket primary results
Party	Candidate	Votes	%
Democratic	Albert D. Rosellini	276,121	30.27%
Republican	Daniel J. Evans (incumbent)	224,953	24.66%
Democratic	Martin J. Durkan	195,931	21.48%
Republican	Perry B. Woodall	100,372	11.00%
Democratic	James A. McDermott	99,155	10.87%
Democratic	Earl Monaghan	5,201	0.57%
Democratic	Rudolfo Valdez	4,440	0.49%
Republican	John Patric	3,343	0.37%
Republican	L. R. Kemoe	2,567	0.28%
Total votes		912,083	100.00%

== General election ==
=== Candidates ===
- Robin David (SWP)
- Daniel J. Evans (R), incumbent governor
- Vick Gould (Taxpayers), businessman
- Henry Killman (SLP), perennial candidate
- Albert D. Rosellini (D), former governor

=== Results ===
1972 Washington gubernatorial election
Party	Candidate	Votes	%	±%
Republican	Daniel J. Evans (incumbent)	747,825	50.78%	−3.93%
Democratic	Albert D. Rosellini	630,613	42.82%	−1.45%
Taxpayers	Vick Gould	86,843	5.90%	
Socialist Workers	Robin David	4,552	0.31%	
Socialist Labor	Henry Killman	2,709	0.18%	+0.10%
Majority		117,212	7.96%	
Total votes		1,472,542	100.00%	
Republican hold		Swing	-2.48%	

=== Results by county ===
County	Daniel J. Evans Republican		Albert D. Rosellini Democratic		Vick Gould Taxpayers		Robin David Socialist Workers		Henry Killman Socialist Labor		Margin		Total votes cast
County	#	%	#	%	#	%	#	%	#	%	#	%	Total votes cast
Adams	2,583	57.17%	1,727	38.22%	204	4.52%	1	0.02%	3	0.07%	856	18.95%	4,518
Asotin	2,851	49.78%	2,750	48.02%	122	2.13%	2	0.03%	2	0.03%	101	1.76%	5,727
Benton	17,010	55.50%	12,540	40.91%	1,003	3.27%	68	0.22%	28	0.09%	4,470	14.58%	30,649
Chelan	9,145	52.66%	7,143	41.13%	1,015	5.84%	40	0.23%	23	0.13%	2,002	11.53%	17,366
Clallam	8,153	50.12%	7,196	44.23%	888	5.46%	18	0.11%	13	0.08%	957	5.88%	16,268
Clark	30,557	51.93%	24,733	42.03%	3,257	5.54%	209	0.36%	87	0.15%	5,824	9.90%	58,843
Columbia	1,094	52.29%	914	43.69%	81	3.87%	0	0.00%	3	0.14%	180	8.60%	2,092
Cowlitz	13,797	49.17%	13,468	48.00%	684	2.44%	54	0.19%	54	0.19%	329	1.17%	28,057
Douglas	3,578	48.23%	3,384	45.62%	451	6.08%	4	0.05%	1	0.01%	194	2.62%	7,418
Ferry	550	36.28%	777	51.25%	187	12.34%	1	0.07%	1	0.07%	-227	-14.97%	1,516
Franklin	5,011	47.73%	5,121	48.78%	338	3.22%	14	0.13%	14	0.13%	-110	-1.05%	10,498
Garfield	832	53.68%	685	44.19%	32	2.06%	1	0.06%	0	0.00%	147	9.48%	1,550
Grant	7,629	48.79%	7,156	45.77%	808	5.17%	23	0.15%	19	0.12%	473	3.03%	15,635
Grays Harbor	9,277	38.51%	13,303	55.22%	1,369	5.68%	48	0.20%	92	0.38%	-4,026	-16.71%	24,089
Island	6,456	58.94%	4,006	36.57%	460	4.20%	19	0.17%	12	0.11%	2,450	22.37%	10,953
Jefferson	2,068	39.97%	2,717	52.51%	347	6.71%	23	0.44%	19	0.37%	-649	-12.54%	5,174
King	292,616	55.41%	204,212	38.67%	27,876	5.28%	2,144	0.41%	1,272	0.24%	88,404	16.74%	528,120
Kitsap	19,720	42.70%	23,652	51.21%	2,612	5.66%	119	0.26%	80	0.17%	-3,932	-8.51%	46,183
Kittitas	5,488	54.04%	4,241	41.76%	382	3.76%	38	0.37%	7	0.07%	1,247	12.28%	10,156
Klickitat	3,084	55.35%	2,267	40.69%	214	3.84%	4	0.07%	3	0.05%	817	14.66%	5,572
Lewis	8,339	40.11%	10,955	52.69%	1,460	7.02%	25	0.12%	11	0.05%	-2,616	-12.58%	20,790
Lincoln	2,757	52.48%	2,137	40.68%	355	6.76%	1	0.02%	3	0.06%	620	11.80%	5,253
Mason	4,093	40.84%	5,386	53.75%	520	5.19%	12	0.12%	10	0.10%	-1,293	-12.90%	10,021
Okanogan	4,197	40.22%	5,141	49.27%	1,070	10.25%	14	0.13%	13	0.12%	-944	-9.05%	10,435
Pacific	2,674	37.32%	4,310	60.15%	161	2.25%	10	0.14%	10	0.14%	-1,636	-22.83%	7,165
Pend Oreille	1,197	40.76%	1,540	52.43%	195	6.64%	3	0.10%	2	0.07%	-343	-11.68%	2,937
Pierce	63,497	42.99%	75,723	51.27%	7,986	5.41%	274	0.19%	214	0.14%	12,226	8.28%	147,694
San Juan	1,828	66.79%	699	25.54%	181	6.61%	18	0.66%	11	0.40%	1,129	41.25%	2,737
Skagit	11,963	47.82%	11,977	47.88%	997	3.99%	56	0.22%	23	0.09%	-14	-0.06%	25,016
Skamania	1,011	36.92%	1,154	42.15%	565	20.64%	5	0.18%	3	0.11%	-143	-5.22%	2,738
Snohomish	50,877	47.88%	46,608	43.86%	8,255	7.77%	328	0.31%	194	0.18%	4,269	4.02%	106,262
Spokane	60,789	48.34%	50,706	40.33%	13,607	10.82%	422	0.34%	218	0.17%	10,083	8.02%	125,742
Stevens	3,232	40.99%	3,568	45.26%	1,060	13.44%	10	0.13%	14	0.18%	-336	-4.26%	7,884
Thurston	18,673	47.71%	17,869	45.66%	2,429	6.21%	114	0.29%	53	0.14%	804	2.05%	39,138
Wahkiakum	793	46.67%	817	48.09%	78	4.59%	3	0.18%	8	0.47%	-24	-1.41%	1,699
Walla Walla	10,042	54.54%	8,004	43.47%	337	1.83%	18	0.10%	11	0.06%	2,038	11.07%	18,412
Whatcom	22,776	59.47%	12,741	33.27%	2,388	6.24%	268	0.70%	124	0.32%	10,035	26.20%	38,297
Whitman	10,915	67.99%	4,428	27.58%	605	3.77%	83	0.52%	24	0.15%	6,487	40.40%	16,055
Yakima	26,673	49.50%	24,858	46.13%	2,264	4.20%	58	0.11%	30	0.06%	1,815	3.37%	53,883
Totals	747,825	50.78%	630,613	42.82%	86,843	5.90%	4,552	0.31%	2,709	0.18%	117,212	7.96%	1,472,542

==== Counties that flipped from Democratic to Republican ====
- Clark
- Cowlitz

==== Counties that flipped from Republican to Democratic ====
- Ferry
- Kitsap
- Lewis
- Okanogan
- Skagit
- Stevens
- Wahkiakum

== See also ==
- Arthur B. Langlie – A former governor of Washington who made a successful comeback in 1940
