= 1968 Washington gubernatorial election =

- November 5, 1968
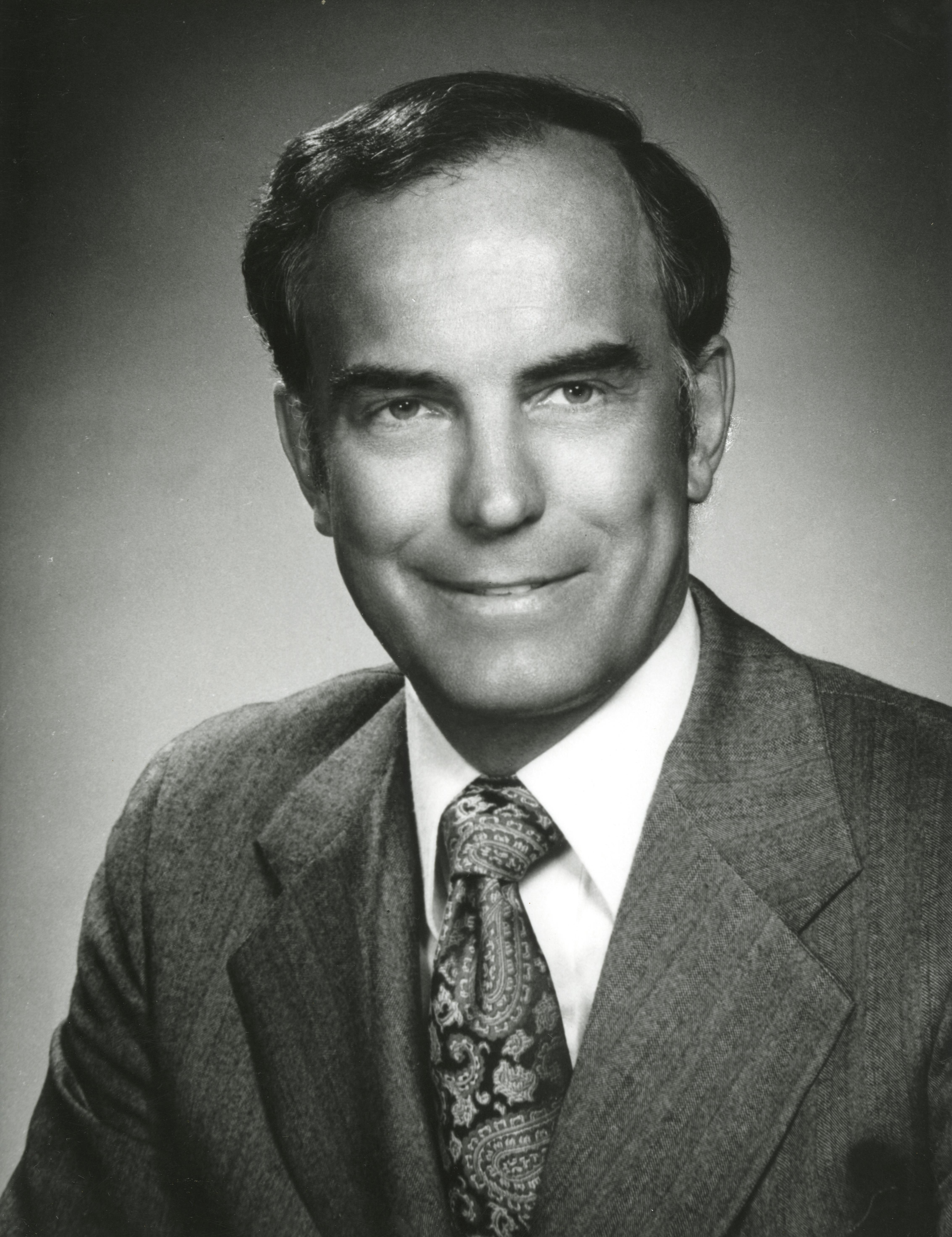

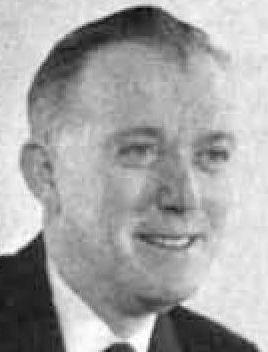
Nominee	Daniel J. Evans	John J. O'Connell
Party	Republican	Democratic
Popular vote	692,378	560,262
Percentage	54.72%	44.28%
- County results Evans: 50–60% 60–70% 70–80% O'Connell: 50–60%
Governor before election
Daniel J. Evans
Republican
Elected Governor
Daniel J. Evans
Republican

The 1968 Washington gubernatorial election took place on November 5, 1968, and resulted in the re-election of Republican incumbent Daniel J. Evans over state Attorney General John J. O'Connell. Martin Durkan, Albert F. Canwell, and John Patric unsuccessfully ran in the blanket primary.

== Primary election ==
=== Candidates ===
- Albert F. Canwell (R), former member of Washington House of Representatives
- Allen J. Courter (R)
- Martin J. Durkan (D), member of Washington Senate
- Daniel J. Evans (R), incumbent governor
- John J. O'Connell (D), Attorney General of Washington
- John Patric (R), writer and perennial candidate
- Ernest T. Rhodefer (R)
- Jack E. Tanner (D)

=== Results ===
Results by county Evans: 30–40%; 40–50%; 50–60%; 60–70%; O'Connell: 30–40%

Blanket primary results
Party	Candidate	Votes	%
Republican	Daniel J. Evans	305,897	43.41%
Democratic	John J. O'Connell	182,969	25.96%
Democratic	Martin J. Durkan	162,382	23.04%
Democratic	Jack E. Tanner	17,155	2.43%
Republican	Albert F. Canwell	15,982	2.27%
Republican	Ernest T. Rhodefer	8,870	1.26%
Republican	Allen J. Courter	6,135	0.87%
Republican	John Patric	5,328	0.76%
Total votes		704,718	100.00%

== General election ==
=== Results ===
1968 Washington gubernatorial election
Party	Candidate	Votes	%	±%
Republican	Daniel J. Evans (incumbent)	692,378	54.72%	−1.05%
Democratic	John J. O'Connell	560,262	44.28%	+0.39%
Conservative	Ken Chriswell	11,602	0.92%	
Socialist Labor	Henry Killman	1,113	0.09%	−0.26%
Majority		132,116	10.44%	
Total votes		1,265,355	100.00%	
Republican hold		Swing	-1.44%	

=== Results by county ===
County	Daniel J. Evans Republican		John J. O'Connell Democratic		Ken Chriswell Conservative		Henry Killman Socialist Labor		Margin		Total votes cast
County	#	%	#	%	#	%	#	%	#	%	Total votes cast
Adams	2,749	67.68%	1,277	31.44%	34	0.84%	2	0.05%	1,472	36.24%	4,062
Asotin	2,818	54.06%	2,347	45.02%	48	0.92%	0	0.00%	471	9.04%	5,213
Benton	15,470	55.56%	12,175	43.72%	191	0.69%	10	0.04%	3,295	11.83%	27,846
Chelan	10,735	63.90%	5,938	35.35%	117	0.70%	9	0.05%	4,797	28.56%	16,799
Clallam	7,035	50.75%	6,703	48.36%	110	0.79%	13	0.09%	332	2.40%	13,861
Clark	20,987	48.13%	22,310	51.16%	287	0.66%	25	0.06%	-1,323	-3.03%	43,609
Columbia	1,183	56.41%	910	43.40%	4	0.19%	0	0.00%	273	13.02%	2,097
Cowlitz	12,160	48.88%	12,559	50.49%	125	0.50%	32	0.13%	-399	-1.60%	24,876
Douglas	3,930	60.33%	2,554	39.21%	29	0.45%	1	0.02%	1,376	21.12%	6,514
Ferry	670	50.34%	617	46.36%	44	3.31%	0	0.00%	53	3.98%	1,331
Franklin	4,451	47.34%	4,839	51.46%	107	1.14%	6	0.06%	-388	-4.13%	9,403
Garfield	862	55.83%	668	43.26%	14	0.91%	0	0.00%	194	12.56%	1,544
Grant	8,334	59.69%	5,467	39.16%	158	1.13%	3	0.02%	2,867	20.53%	13,962
Grays Harbor	9,734	44.02%	12,260	55.44%	77	0.35%	42	0.19%	-2,526	-11.42%	22,113
Island	4,767	61.02%	2,994	38.33%	51	0.65%	0	0.00%	1,773	22.70%	7,812
Jefferson	1,972	44.91%	2,361	53.77%	54	1.23%	4	0.09%	-389	-8.86%	4,391
King	271,954	59.55%	179,117	39.22%	4,977	1.09%	619	0.14%	92,837	20.33%	456,667
Kitsap	19,555	50.21%	19,170	49.22%	210	0.54%	11	0.03%	385	0.99%	38,946
Kittitas	4,996	58.67%	3,488	40.96%	26	0.31%	6	0.07%	1,508	17.71%	8,516
Klickitat	2,671	54.12%	2,248	45.55%	13	0.26%	3	0.06%	423	8.57%	4,935
Lewis	9,462	51.54%	8,808	47.98%	87	0.47%	2	0.01%	654	3.56%	18,359
Lincoln	3,271	66.65%	1,600	32.60%	37	0.75%	0	0.00%	1,671	34.05%	4,908
Mason	4,130	48.67%	4,324	50.96%	29	0.34%	2	0.02%	-194	-2.29%	8,485
Okanogan	5,458	56.98%	3,978	41.53%	142	1.48%	1	0.01%	1,480	15.45%	9,579
Pacific	2,812	44.16%	3,534	55.50%	20	0.31%	2	0.03%	-722	-11.34%	6,368
Pend Oreille	1,263	47.95%	1,340	50.87%	31	1.18%	0	0.00%	-77	-2.92%	2,634
Pierce	56,454	42.57%	74,843	56.43%	1,227	0.93%	98	0.07%	-18,389	-13.87%	132,622
San Juan	1,346	71.25%	531	28.11%	12	0.64%	0	0.00%	815	43.14%	1,889
Skagit	11,627	52.34%	10,443	47.01%	123	0.55%	21	0.09%	1,184	5.33%	22,214
Skamania	1,066	46.92%	1,185	52.16%	20	0.88%	1	0.04%	-119	-5.24%	2,272
Snohomish	43,929	51.55%	40,461	47.48%	766	0.90%	58	0.07%	3,468	4.07%	85,214
Spokane	59,982	55.57%	46,869	43.42%	1,049	0.97%	39	0.04%	13,113	12.15%	107,939
Stevens	3,682	52.08%	3,185	45.05%	203	2.87%	0	0.00%	497	7.03%	7,070
Thurston	16,383	54.50%	13,511	44.95%	151	0.50%	16	0.05%	2,872	9.55%	30,061
Wahkiakum	812	50.37%	793	49.19%	6	0.37%	1	0.06%	19	1.18%	1,612
Walla Walla	9,909	60.28%	6,441	39.18%	85	0.52%	4	0.02%	3,468	21.10%	16,439
Whatcom	17,612	57.98%	12,481	41.09%	250	0.82%	31	0.10%	5,131	16.89%	30,374
Whitman	9,581	72.25%	3,572	26.94%	87	0.66%	20	0.15%	6,009	45.32%	13,260
Yakima	26,566	53.60%	22,361	45.12%	601	1.21%	31	0.06%	4,205	8.48%	49,559
Totals	692,378	54.72%	560,262	44.28%	11,602	0.92%	1,113	0.09%	132,116	10.44%	1,265,355

==== Counties that flipped from Democratic to Republican ====
- Thurston

==== Counties that flipped from Republican to Democratic ====
- Clark
- Cowlitz
- Pacific
- Pend Oreille
- Skamania
