= Charles McCann (disambiguation) =

Charles McCann (1899-1980) was a naturalist in India.

Charles McCann may also refer to:

- Charles J. McCann (1926-2015), the first President of Evergreen State College, Olympia, Washington, USA

== See also ==
- Charles H. McCann Technical High School, North Adams, Massachusetts, USA
