= Seattle Animal Shelter =

Agency of the government of Seattle

Seattle Animal Shelter is an agency of the government of Seattle. It operates animal shelter and animal control services. It also controls pet licensing for residents of Seattle. In Seattle, dogs and cats must be licensed.

The agency operates the Spay and Neuter Clinic, adjacent to the shelter.

== History ==
The current shelter dates from 1982. Planning for this shelter began circa 1972. The city government previously used a leased facility; the lease was set to expire in 1978. Mayor of Seattle Charles Royer had a plan to build a new animal shelter by two restaurants.

There was an interim facility, a warehouse, that was used in the period circa 1980-1982. That interim building lacked an isolation facility to prevent animals with diseases from infecting other animals. Some construction issues delayed the opening of the 1982 shelter. The 1982 shelter was the first building that was specifically built to be an animal shelter for the city.

In 2023, the shelter started a support group for owners who had lost a pet.

In 2024, Cascade PBS made a news report stating that there was "an increasingly fraught culture at" the shelter.

Esteban Rodriguez, who was the director, began working for the shelter in 2021. He resigned in 2024. He stated that the city government did not provide adequate funding and did not do remodeling that it should do.

== Operations ==
In 2007 the shelter itself did not have an in-house veterinary service. It had a contract with an external veterinarian but would only pay up to $40 for a service for each animal.
