= Albert Rosellini =

15th governor of Washington (1910–2011)

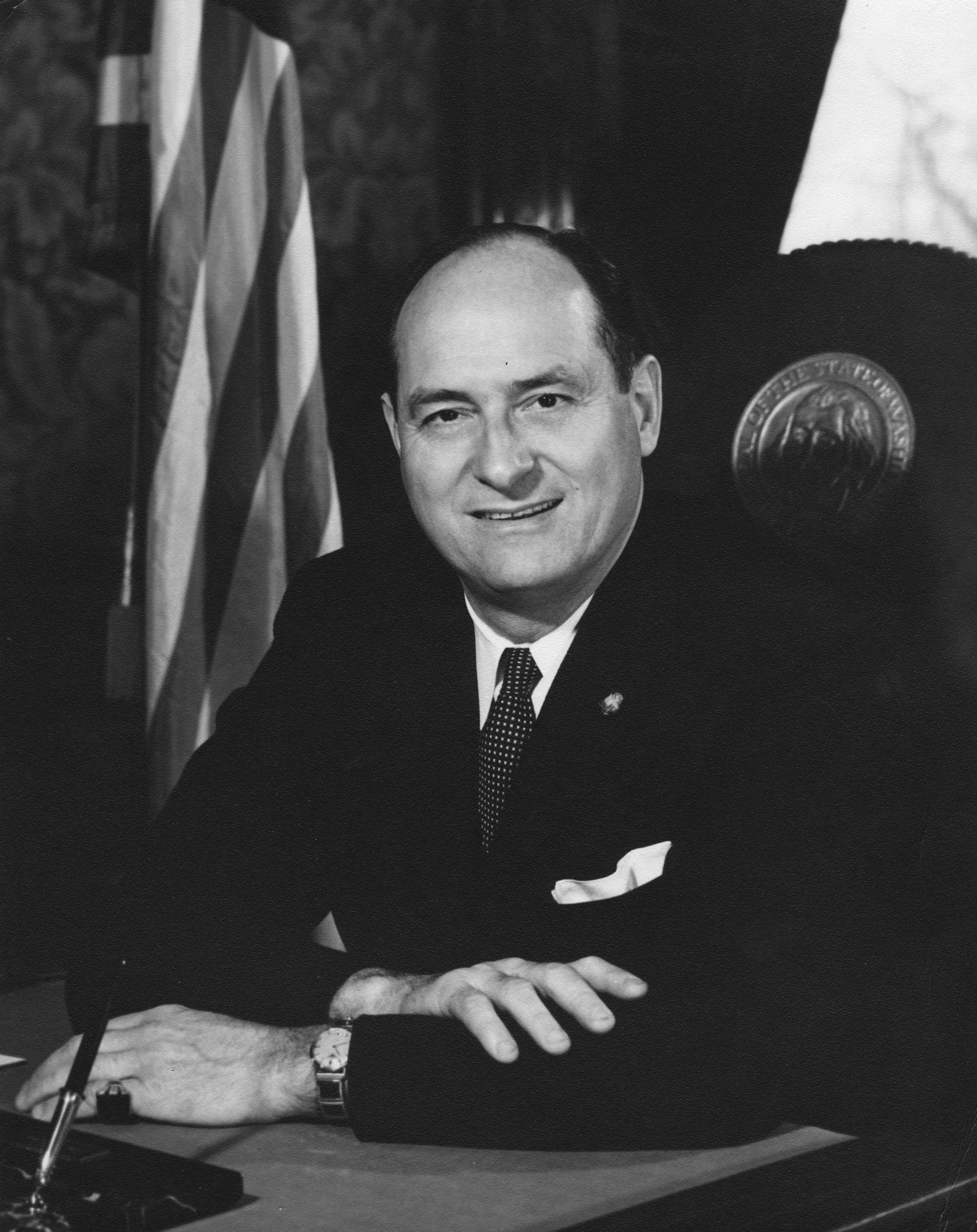

Chair of the National Governors Association
- In office July 1, 1962 – July 21, 1963
- Preceded by: Wesley Powell
- Succeeded by: John Anderson Jr.

15th Governor of Washington
- In office January 16, 1957 – January 13, 1965
- Lieutenant: John Cherberg
- Preceded by: Arthur B. Langlie
- Succeeded by: Daniel J. Evans

President pro tempore of the Washington Senate
- In office January 12, 1943 – January 14, 1945
- Preceded by: George A. Lovejoy
- Succeeded by: Carl C. Mohler

Member of the Washington Senate from the 33rd district
- In office January 9, 1939 – January 14, 1957
- Preceded by: James A. Murphy
- Succeeded by: Frank Connor

Personal details
- Born: Albert Dean Rosellini; January 21, 1910 Tacoma, Washington, U.S.
- Died: October 10, 2011 (aged 101) Seattle, Washington, U.S.
- Resting place: Calvary Cemetery
- Party: Democratic
- Spouse: Ethel McNeil (m. 1937; died 2002)
- Children: 5
- Education: University of Washington (BA, LLB)

Albert Dean Rosellini (January 21, 1910 – October 10, 2011) was an American politician who served as the 15th governor of Washington from 1957 to 1965 and was both the first Italian-American and Roman Catholic governor elected west of the Mississippi River.

During a political career that spanned 40 years, Rosellini was an activist leader who worked to reform the state's prisons and mental health facilities, expand the state highway system, create the University of Washington's medical and dental schools, and build the second floating bridge across Lake Washington.

Rosellini holds the record as the longest-lived U.S. state governor in American history, having reached the age of 101 years, 262 days.

== Early life and education ==
Born in Tacoma, Washington, Rosellini was the only son of Italian immigrants, Annunziata (Pagni) and Giovanni Rosellini, a saloon operator. He worked his way through college and law school at the University of Washington, where he was a member of Tau Kappa Epsilon fraternity, graduating in 1933 with his classmate Hugh J. Rosellini (no relation), a childhood friend and later state Supreme Court justice.

== Career ==
=== Washington Senate ===
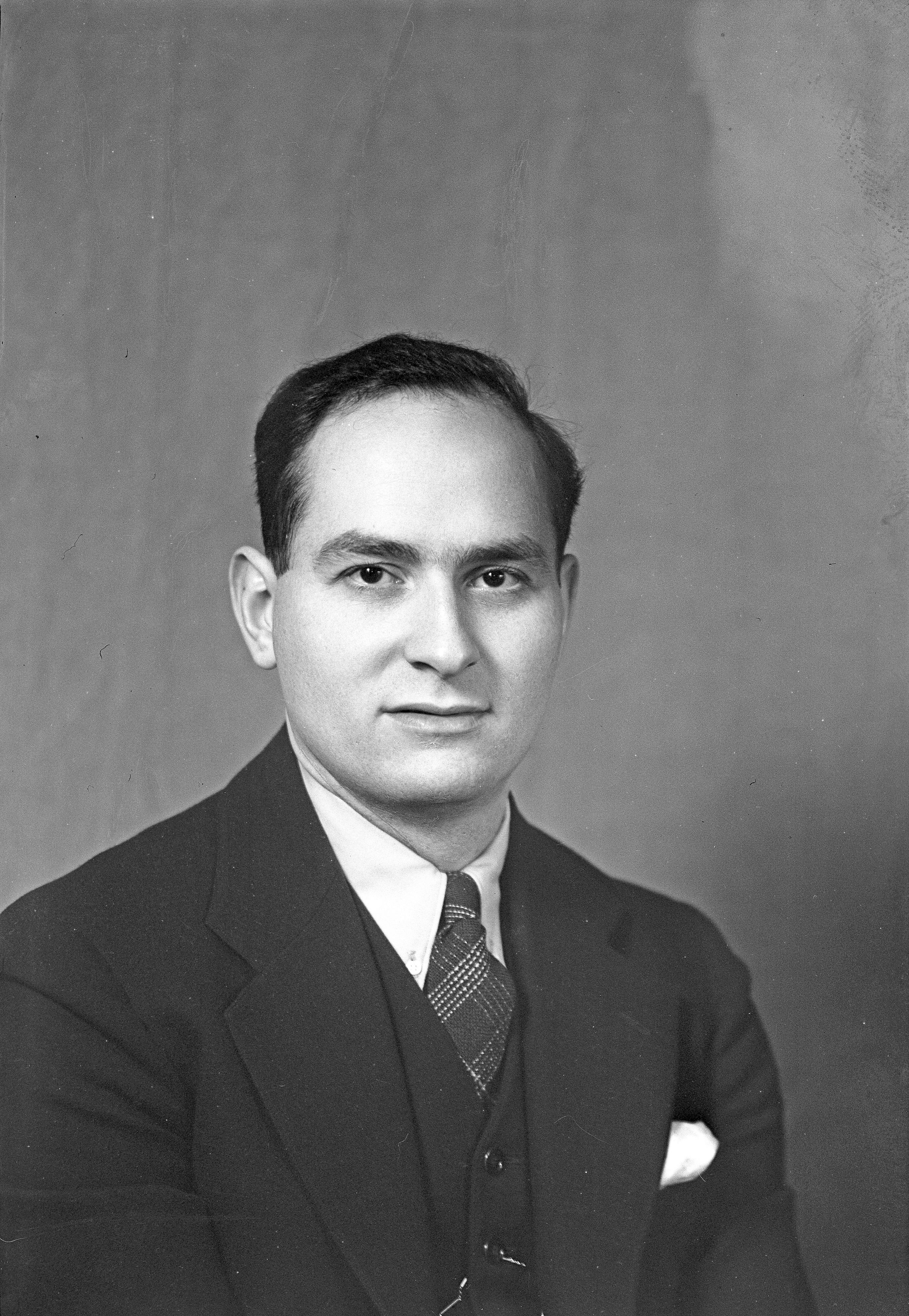
Rosellini's official State Senate portrait, 1941

At the age of 29, Rosellini was elected to the Washington State Senate as its youngest member, representing the 33rd district in south Seattle—the home of many Italian immigrants. A New Deal Democrat supported by the Washington Commonwealth Federation, Rosellini served from 1939 to 1957, and rose to the rank of majority leader. He was elected governor in the 1956 Washington gubernatorial election, winning by 108,732 votes.

=== Governorship ===
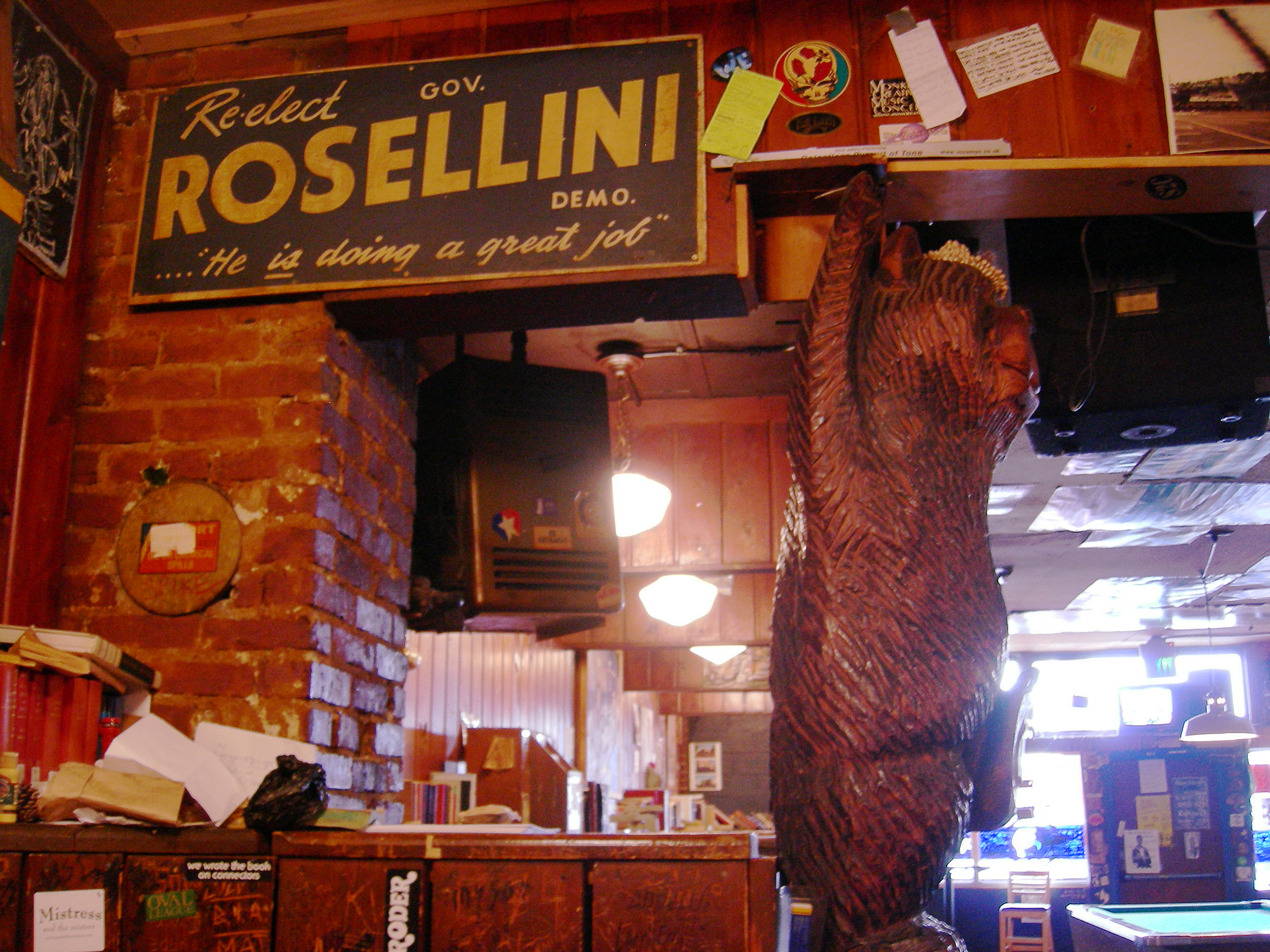
Rosellini re-election campaign sign at Seattle's Blue Moon Tavern in 2007

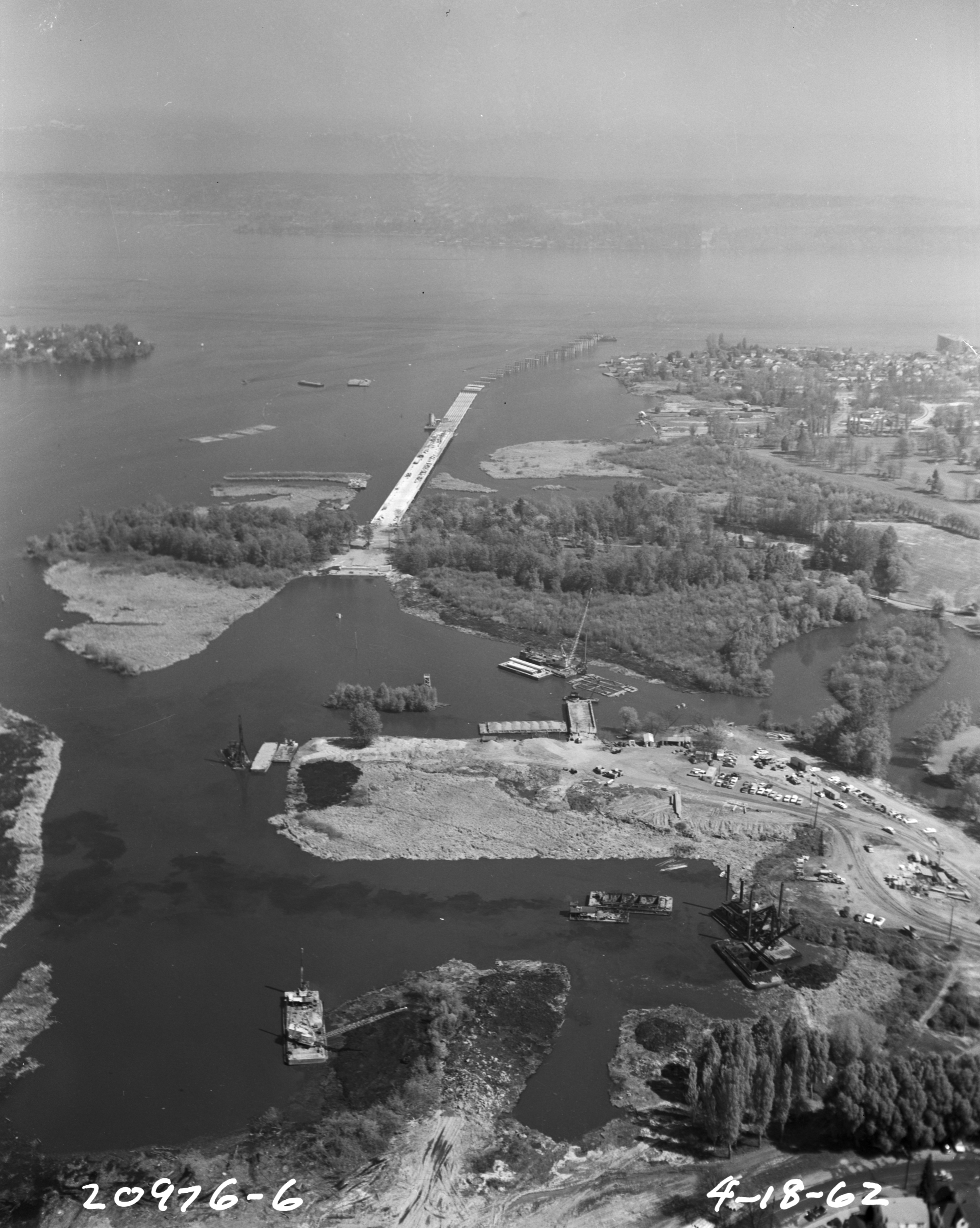
Evergreen Point Bridge under construction in 1962

As governor, Rosellini coupled personal charm with decades of political experience, developing a reputation for decisiveness and ability to move ahead on long-stalled projects. Don Hannula, longtime political columnist for The Seattle Times, wrote in 1996, "He was not a man of empty rhetoric. He got things done. His legacy is everywhere." In his 1997 biography, Rosellini, Immigrant's Son and Progressive Governor, author Payton Smith wrote: "He was attracted to issues where progress could be made and measured . . . Budget reform, economic development, transportation, higher education and institutions were the core matters to which he devoted his talent and governmental know-how." Rosellini was narrowly re-elected in 1960, beating Republican Lloyd J. Andrews by 17,865 votes.

In order to promote economic development, Rosellini established a state Department of Commerce and championed the Seattle World's Fair in 1962. He shepherded construction of the former longest floating bridge in the world, the original Evergreen Point Floating Bridge, which opened in 1963 and carried State Route 520 over Lake Washington from Seattle to Medina. It was renamed for Rosellini in 1988. After 53 years of service, it was replaced by a new floating bridge at the same site in 2016, which also bears his name. In addition, he was a tireless supporter of higher education, strengthening the state university system and developing a system of junior colleges. During his time in office, Rosellini also reformed the state budget process and balanced the budget.

=== 1964 gubernatorial election ===
Rosellini was defeated in his bid for a third term in 1964 by Republican Daniel J. Evans, a state legislator and civil engineer. Rosellini entered the primary unopposed by his ostensive rivals for the Democratic nomination, Lieutenant Governor John Cherberg or Attorney General John J. O'Connell, but did encounter opposition from several unknown candidates who collectively garnered close to 50,000 votes.

The general election campaign was marked by bruising attacks on the candidate's integrity from both the Republican and Democratic camps. Governor Rosellini attempted to portray Evans as a supporter of Barry Goldwater and his record as antithetical to the interests of labor, welfare, and education. Evans in turn charged Rosellini with financial impropriety and cronyism, alleging that the Governor solicited campaign funds from businesses under contract with the state government. Only one televised debate was agreed between the two candidates. The coattails of President Johnson did not extend to this race, as the 39-year-old Evans won by 148,564 votes.

=== 1972 attempted comeback ===
Rosellini made a comeback bid eight years later in 1972; he captured the Democratic nomination, but was again defeated by Evans. Starting with a lead in the polls, Rosellini saw his support fall when he disparagingly referred to Governor Evans as "Danny Boy" and being accused of intervening on behalf of his friend Frank Colacurcio to obtain a club license in Hawaii while in office. A minority of Evans' supporters also began to sport bumper stickers on the back of their cars stating "We Don't Need A Godfather," described by his daughter Lynn Rosellini as extremely hurtful to her father given his pride over his Italian ancestry. (The popular Oscar-winning film The Godfather was released earlier that year.) Rosellini would later state his belief that the attack contributed to his loss, saying "That mafia crap really hurt, overnight I dropped 12 percent in the ratings. I don't think people believe it so much as it scared the hell out of them."

=== Consultant and elder statesman ===
After leaving office in 1965, Rosellini returned to the practice of law, and also became a political consultant, specializing in matters of the liquor and entertainment industries. Over the years, Rossellini served as an elder statesman of the state Democratic Party, mentoring political figures including Washington governors Christine Gregoire and Gary Locke.

In 2003, Rosellini was back in the news briefly when he was reported to have delivered campaign contributions to Seattle City Council members on behalf of strip-club owners, one of whom (the aforementioned Frank Colacurcio) was a convicted racketeer. Rosellini was never charged in the scandal that became known as "Strippergate."

Until his death, Rosellini attended fundraisers for candidates and helped raise money for charities, particularly the Washington State Olympics Committee, which he chaired for many years.

Danny Westneat, columnist for The Seattle Times, wrote in 2005, "His record makes most governors after him look like slackers."

== Personal life ==
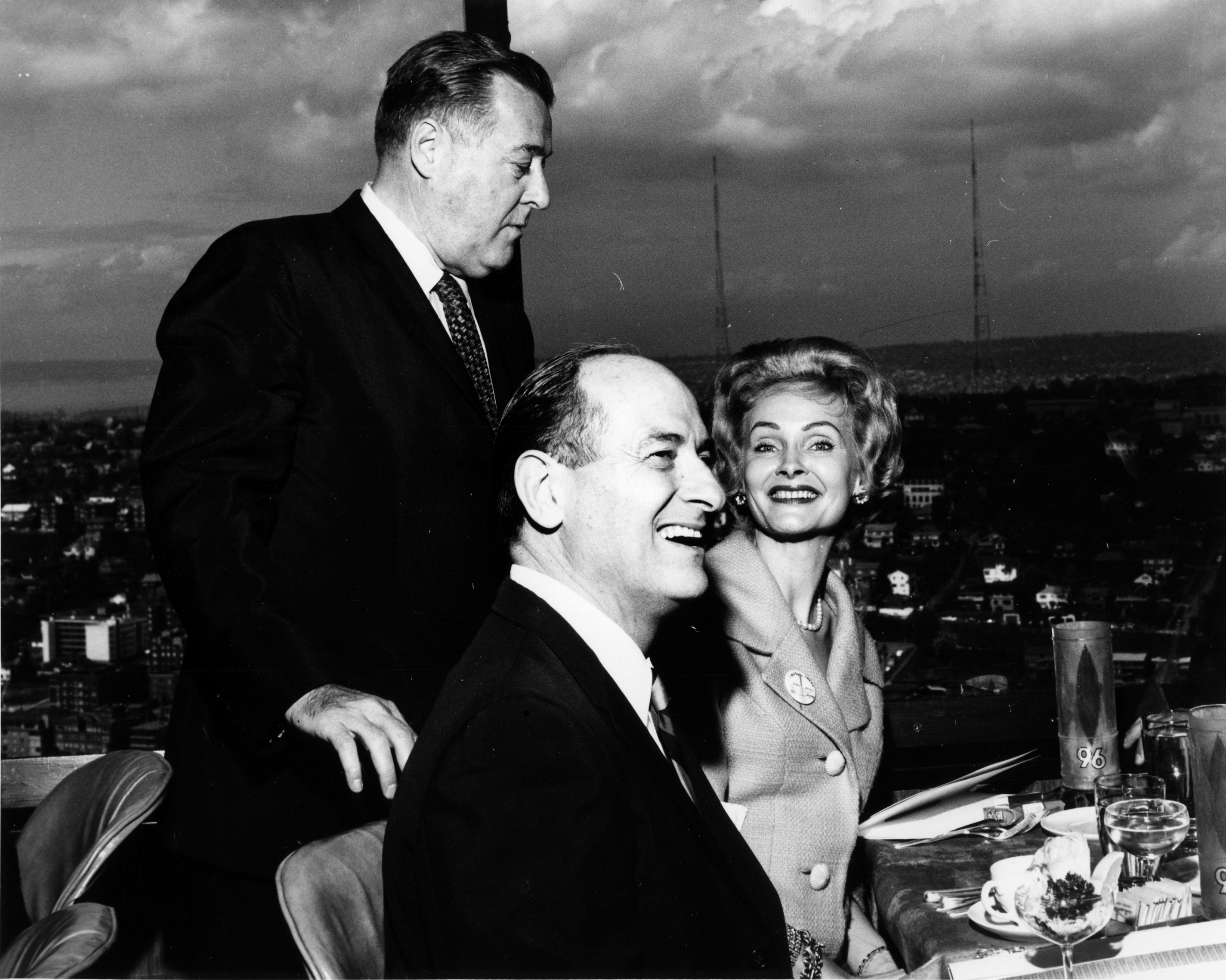
Rosellini with his wife Ethel, 1962, at the opening of the Space Needle restaurant. Senator Warren Magnuson at left.

Rosellini and his wife Ethel (1912–2002), whom he married in 1937, had five children. Ethel died in 2002, after 64 years of marriage. Albert and Ethel had a close, affectionate, and happy marriage, and the two were known for their devotion to each other. Rosellini was a practicing Catholic.

== Later life and death ==
Rosellini celebrated his 100th birthday in January 2010, becoming one of the few U.S. state governors ever to reach the age of 100. He died of complications related to pneumonia in Seattle, on October 10, 2011, at the age of 101. Rosellini's funeral was at St. James Cathedral in Seattle, and he was buried at Calvary Cemetery, alongside his wife.

Washington State Senate
Preceded by George A. Lovejoy	President pro tempore of the Washington Senate; 1943–1945	Succeeded by Carl C. Mohler
Party political offices
Preceded by Hugh Mitchell	Democratic nominee for Governor of Washington; 1956, 1960, 1964	Succeeded by John J. O'Connell
Preceded by John O'Connell	Democratic nominee for Governor of Washington; 1972	Succeeded by Dixy Lee Ray
Political offices
Preceded by Arthur B. Langlie	Governor of Washington; 1957–1965	Succeeded by Daniel J. Evans
Preceded by Wesley Powell	Chair of the National Governors Association; 1962–1963	Succeeded by John Anderson Jr.
Honorary titles
Preceded by Elmer L. Andersen	Oldest living American governor 2004–2011	Succeeded by Raúl Héctor Castro
