= Hugo N. Frye =

Hugo N. Frye was a fictional figure, purportedly the founder of the Republican Party in New York state, made up by Cornell University students in 1930 as a prank designed to embarrass several state politicians. Hugo N. Frye was also a pseudonym of author and political satirist John Patric, under which he ran for public office 13 times over a period of 23 years.

== The hoax ==
The students, Edward T. Horn III and Lester Blumner, had two motivations. First, they were searching for a gimmick for the annual banquet of the staff of The Cornell Daily Sun. Second, they were in a class in which the professor discussed a recent scandal in France in which a number of French politicians had been duped into supporting a swindler; the professor concluded by stating that this could not happen in the United States. Horn and Blumner took this as a challenge, and sent out letters inviting prominent Republican politicians to a banquet in honor of Hugo N. Frye ("you go and fry").

None of the victims accepted the invitation, but most of the responses included flowery encomiums on the virtues of the supposed honoree. The responses were read to great hilarity to the attendees of the banquet. One of the members of The Sun staff had ties to the New York Times and passed the story on. As one of the victims was Vice President Charles Curtis, The Times ran the story. The Vice President took the prank with good humor.

Cornell University eventually reacted by pressuring the duo to issue an apology and resign from The Cornell Daily Sun in exchange for not being expelled. However, they continued writing for the Sun under pseudonyms. Horn went on to become a prominent Lutheran pastor, while Blummer served as a U.S. Army corporal in North Africa.
