= Charles Royer =

American politician (1939–2024)

Charley Royer
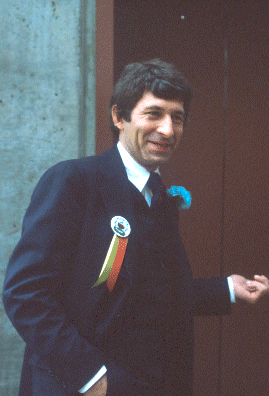
- Royer in 1978

48th Mayor of Seattle
- In office January 1, 1978 – January 1, 1990
- Preceded by: Wesley C. Uhlman
- Succeeded by: Norm Rice

57th President of the National League of Cities
- In office 1983
- Preceded by: Ferd L. Harrison
- Succeeded by: George Latimer

Personal details
- Born: August 22, 1939 Medford, Oregon, U.S.
- Died: July 26, 2024 (aged 84) Gearhart, Oregon, U.S.
- Political party: Independent
- Children: 2
- Education: University of Oregon (BA)

Charles Theodore Royer (August 22, 1939 – July 26, 2024) was an American news reporter and politician who served as the 48th mayor of Seattle, Washington from 1978 to 1990. After serving as mayor of Seattle, Royer became the director of the Harvard Institute of Politics.

== Early life and career ==
Royer was born in Medford, Oregon on August 22, 1939. He earned a baseball scholarship from Portland State College and was a part-time employee in the advertising department for the Oregon Journal during college. Royer dropped out of college to work for Sears but was drafted by the U.S. Army in 1961; he worked at a post newspaper at Fort Hood, Texas, and later in Fort Stewart in Georgia. Royer was discharged from the Army in 1963. He enrolled at the University of Oregon and majored in journalism and worked part-time at KEZI-TV in Eugene, Oregon, alongside his younger brother Bob, and later KVAL-TV.

He graduated from the University of Oregon in 1966 and spent six years as a political reporter for KOIN in Portland, Oregon. Royer briefly worked on the East Coast and was a visiting associate at the Harvard-MIT Joint Center for Urban Studies from 1969 to 1970. He received an award from the American Political Science Association for distinguished public affairs reporting in 1969. Royer returned to the Pacific Northwest in 1970, when he joined KING-TV in Seattle as a news analyst and shared a beat with his brother Bob. In 1975, Royer received the Sigma Delta Chi Distinguished Service award and the Edward R. Murrow award for editorializing on television. He was awarded a fellowship to study government and public policy at the Washington, D.C. Journalism Center.

== Mayor of Seattle ==
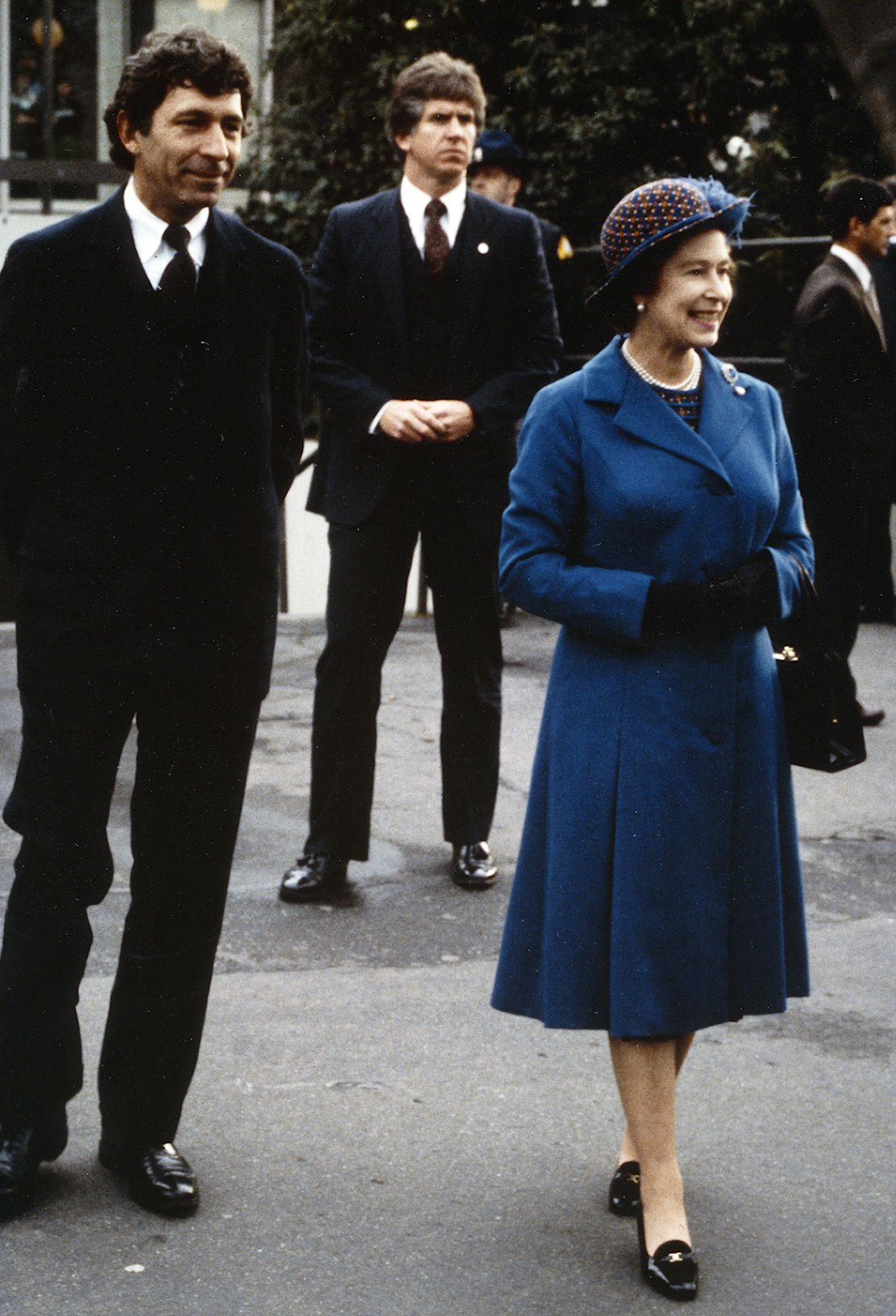
Mayor Royer with Queen Elizabeth II, 1983

In 1977, Royer defeated 13 other candidates to become the mayor of Seattle. He served three four-year terms in that office, longer than any other mayor in the city's history. He oversaw several improvements in the city, including the establishment of a recycling program that has been recognized as the best in the nation. His administration tackled social issues such as poverty, teenage pregnancy, and drugs. As President of the National League of Cities in 1983, he became a spokesperson for American cities on issues such as housing, healthcare, civil liberties, and the needs of children.

In 1983, following the death of Senator Henry Jackson, Royer ran as a Democrat in the subsequent special election. He placed fourth in the blanket primary. The election was eventually won by Republican former governor Daniel J. Evans.

In 1989, Business Month named Seattle as one of the best-managed cities in the nation. Places Rated Almanac called it the nation's "Most Livable City," and the National Urban Coalition named Royer the Distinguished Urban Mayor of the Year.

== Directorship at Harvard ==
In 1990, Royer succeeded Richard Thornburgh as director of the Harvard Institute of Politics at the John F. Kennedy School of Government. Democratic National Committee member Ronald H. Brown of the IOP's senior advisory committee stated, "Mayor Royer believes that people make the real difference in politics, and in bringing the people of his city together, he has been one of the most innovative and artful city executives in the nation." Royer's appointment created recognition that, as The Seattle Times commented, "not all political savvy emanates from the East Coast."

From 1995 to 2006, Royer served as director of the National Program Office for the Urban Health Initiative, which is funded by the Robert Wood Johnson Foundation. UHI worked closely with five United States cities (Baltimore, Detroit, Oakland, Philadelphia, and Richmond, Virginia) to help improve the health and safety of children living in those areas.

== Later life and death ==
In 2005, he founded the non-profit Institute for Community Change to continue guiding work at the national level aimed at improving community health. In 2007, Royer became a founding partner of The Royer Group, a consulting firm that provided professional services in public policy development, governmental liaison, public finance, business and leadership development, marketing communications, and program management. He was considered for the appointment as King County Executive, a position vacated in May 2009 when Ron Sims was appointed Deputy Director of the United States Department of Housing and Urban Development by the Obama administration.

Royer's son, Jordan, ran unsuccessfully for Seattle City Council in 2009.

Royer died at his home in Gearhart, Oregon, on July 26, 2024, at the age of 84.

== See also ==
- Timeline of Seattle, 1970s-1980s

Political offices
Preceded by Wesley C. Uhlman	Mayor of Seattle; 1978–1989	Succeeded by Norm Rice
