= John J. O'Connell (politician) =

13th Attorney General of Washington

John O'Connell
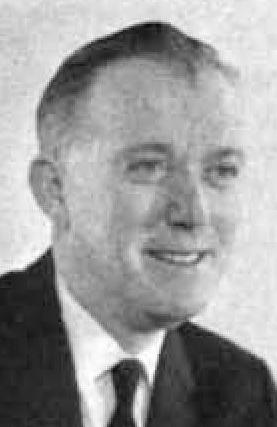

13th Attorney General of Washington
- In office January 16, 1957 – January 15, 1969
- Governor: Albert D. Rosellini; Daniel J. Evans
- Preceded by: Don Eastvold
- Succeeded by: Slade Gorton

Personal details
- Born: John James O'Connell; April 20, 1919 Tacoma, Washington, U.S.
- Died: March 26, 1998 (aged 78) Tacoma, Washington, U.S.
- Party: Democratic
- Spouse: Margaret Hatchell (m. 1947)
- Children: 6
- Education: Gonzaga University (LLB)

Military service
- Allegiance: United States
- Branch/service: United States Army
- Battles/wars: World War II

John James O'Connell (April 20, 1919 – March 26, 1998) was an American lawyer and politician from Washington who served as the 13th Attorney General of Washington from 1957 to 1969.

== Early life and education ==
O'Connell was born and raised in Tacoma, Washington. He earned a Bachelor of Laws from the Gonzaga University School of Law and served as a captain in the United States Army during World War II.

== Career ==
After serving in the Army, O'Connell returned to Tacoma and established a private legal practice. He served as the city prosecutor of Tacoma and county prosecutor of Pierce County, Washington. O'Connell was elected Attorney General of Washington in 1956, and served until 1969. O'Connell was succeeded in office by Slade Gorton. O'Connell was also the Democratic nominee in the 1968 Washington gubernatorial election, losing to Republican Daniel J. Evans. Soon after leaving office, O'Connell resumed his private legal practice.

== Personal life ==
O'Connell and his wife, Margaret, had six children. He died in Tacoma on March 24, 1998, at the age of 78.

Party political offices
| Preceded by Albert Rosellini | Democratic nominee for Governor of Washington; 1968 | Succeeded by Albert Rosellini |
