= Newman H. Clark =

American politician

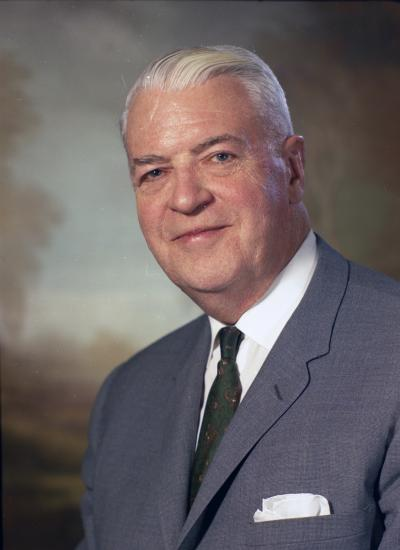

Member of the Washington House of Representatives from the 43rd district
- In office January 11, 1965 – January 11, 1971
- Preceded by: Daniel J. Evans
- Succeeded by: John B. Rabel
- In office July 10, 1950 – January 12, 1959
- Preceded by: William D. Shannon
- Succeeded by: Daniel J. Evans

Personal details
- Born: Newman Hall Clark; December 7, 1899 New Jersey, U.S.
- Died: January 3, 1978 (aged 78) Seattle, Washington, U.S.
- Party: Republican

Newman Hall (Zeke) Clark (December 7, 1899 – January 3, 1978) was an American politician in the state of Washington. He served in the Washington House of Representatives from 1950 to 1959 and again from 1965 to 1971.
