= 1964 Washington gubernatorial election =

- November 3, 1964
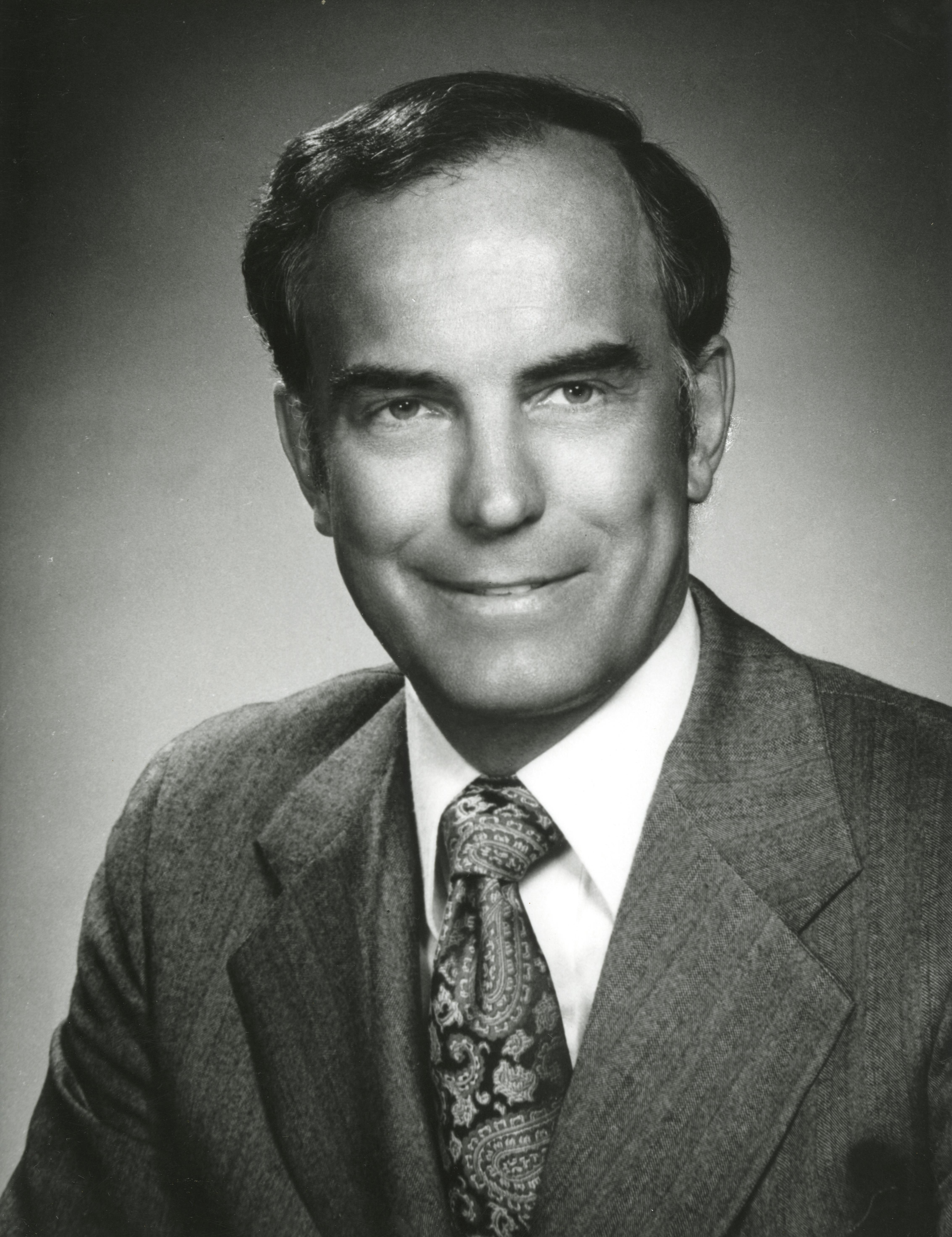

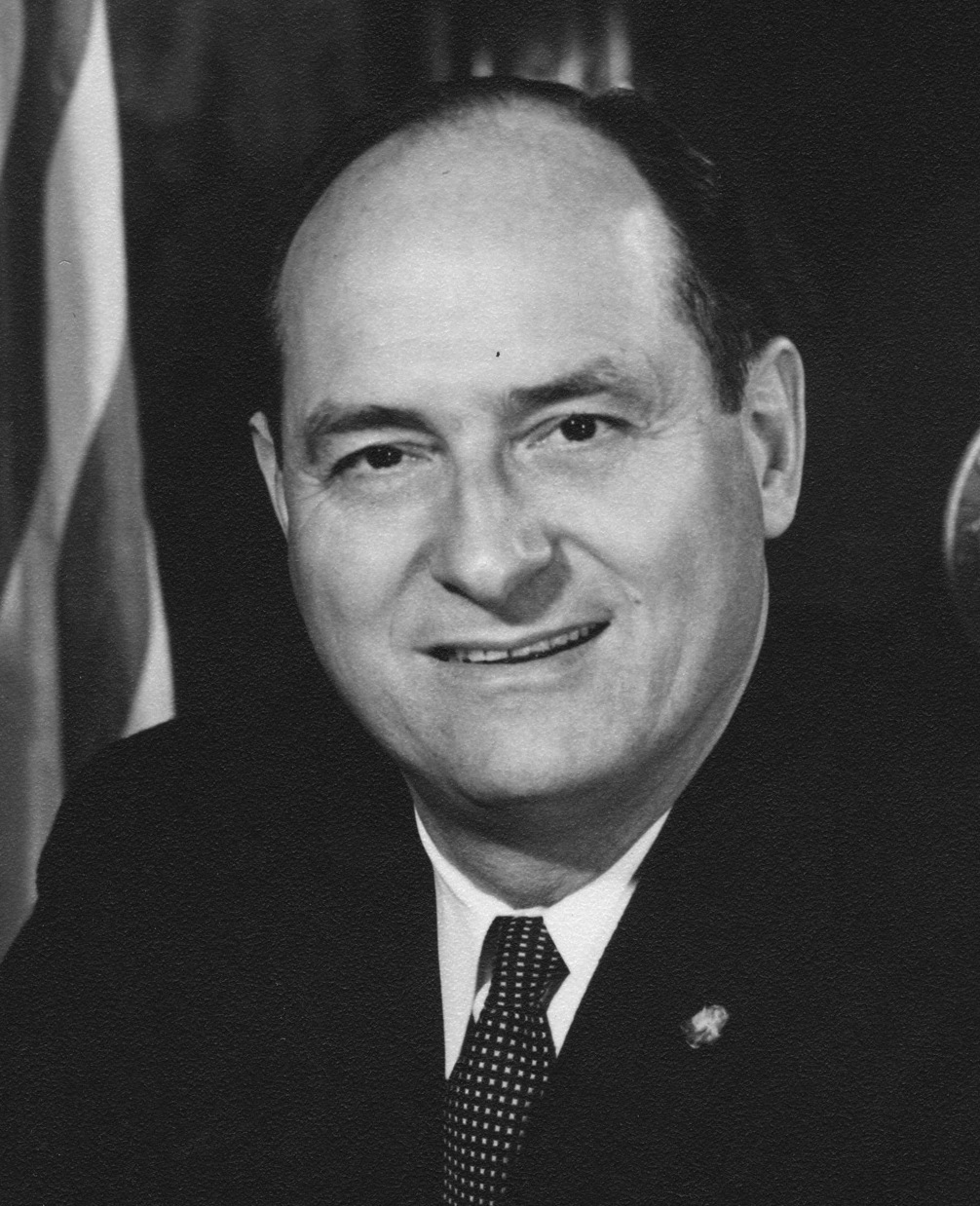
Nominee	Daniel J. Evans	Albert Rosellini
Party	Republican	Democratic
Popular vote	697,256	548,692
Percentage	55.77%	43.89%
- County results Evans: 50–60% 60–70% 70–80% Rosellini: 50–60%
Governor before election
Albert Rosellini
Democratic
Elected Governor
Daniel J. Evans
Republican

The 1964 Washington gubernatorial election took place on November 3, 1964, between incumbent Democratic governor Albert Rosellini and Republican nominee Daniel J. Evans.

Rosellini, a former state senator, was elected governor in 1956 and re-elected in 1960; he had become unpopular after a series of scandals and increasing partisan division in the state legislature. Evans was a member of the state house of representatives and became the minority leader for the Republicans.

Despite the state's favoring of Democrats in national elections in 1964, Evans won by a large margin using a "Blueprint for Progress" as a cornerstone of his campaign. John Patric unsuccessfully ran in the blanket primary.

== Primary election ==
=== Candidates ===
- John Abretske (D)
- Richard G. Christensen (R), Republican nominee for United States Senate in 1962
- Daniel J. Evans (R), member of Washington House of Representatives
- Lou Kessler (R)
- Jessop McDonnell (D)
- John Patric (D), writer and perennial candidate
- Stewart W. Petersen (D)
- Albert D. Rosellini (D), incumbent governor

=== Results ===
Blanket primary results
Party	Candidate	Votes	%
Republican	Daniel J. Evans	323,152	39.11%
Democratic	Albert Rosellini (incumbent)	243,220	29.44%
Republican	Richard G. Christensen	213,217	25.81%
Democratic	Jessop McDonnell	17,262	2.09%
Democratic	Stewart W. Petersen	12,489	1.51%
Democratic	John Patric	9,710	1.18%
Democratic	John Abretske	3,913	0.47%
Republican	Lou Kessler	3,296	0.40%
Total votes		826,259	100.00%

== General election ==
=== Results ===
1964 Washington gubernatorial election
Party	Candidate	Votes	%	±%
Republican	Daniel J. Evans	697,256	55.77%	+6.90%
Democratic	Albert D. Rosellini (Incumbent)	548,692	43.89%	−6.45%
Socialist Labor	Henry Killman	4,326	0.35%	−0.37%
Majority		148,564	11.88%	
Total votes		1,250,274	100.00%	
Republican gain from Democratic		Swing	+13.35%	

=== Results by county ===
Evans was the first Republican gubernatorial candidate to carry Cowlitz County since 1924. Additionally, Ferry County, Grant County, Kitsap County, and Snohomish County voted Republican for the first time since 1928. Pacific County did not back a Republican gubernatorial candidate again until 2016.

County	Daniel J. Evans Republican		Albert D. Rosellini Democratic		Henry Killman Socialist Labor		Margin		Total votes cast
County	#	%	#	%	#	%	#	%	Total votes cast
Adams	3,043	71.16%	1,232	28.81%	1	0.02%	1,811	42.35%	4,276
Asotin	2,823	52.30%	2,572	47.65%	3	0.06%	251	4.65%	5,398
Benton	15,441	54.52%	12,876	45.47%	3	0.01%	2,565	9.06%	28,320
Chelan	10,183	57.51%	7,463	42.15%	60	0.34%	2,720	15.36%	17,706
Clallam	7,063	52.74%	6,314	47.14%	16	0.12%	749	5.59%	13,393
Clark	23,631	57.24%	17,560	42.54%	92	0.22%	6,071	14.71%	41,283
Columbia	1,507	68.94%	679	31.06%	0	0.00%	828	37.88%	2,186
Cowlitz	13,840	57.07%	10,304	42.49%	105	0.43%	3,536	14.58%	24,249
Douglas	3,627	57.49%	2,677	42.43%	5	0.08%	950	15.06%	6,309
Ferry	769	53.74%	662	46.26%	0	0.00%	107	7.48%	1,431
Franklin	4,887	48.74%	5,094	50.81%	45	0.45%	-207	-2.06%	10,026
Garfield	1,068	70.26%	452	29.74%	0	0.00%	616	40.53%	1,520
Grant	8,756	61.07%	5,574	38.88%	8	0.06%	3,182	22.19%	14,338
Grays Harbor	10,435	45.67%	12,294	53.80%	121	0.53%	-1,859	-8.14%	22,850
Island	4,373	62.87%	2,575	37.02%	8	0.12%	1,798	25.85%	6,956
Jefferson	2,150	48.46%	2,286	51.52%	1	0.02%	-136	-3.07%	4,437
King	254,630	56.92%	190,384	42.56%	2,329	0.52%	64,246	14.36%	447,343
Kitsap	19,161	50.91%	18,420	48.94%	55	0.15%	741	1.97%	37,636
Kittitas	4,632	54.46%	3,865	45.44%	8	0.09%	767	9.02%	8,505
Klickitat	3,465	62.07%	2,112	37.84%	5	0.09%	1,353	24.24%	5,582
Lewis	10,636	56.26%	8,256	43.67%	13	0.07%	2,380	12.59%	18,905
Lincoln	3,749	72.60%	1,413	27.36%	2	0.04%	2,336	45.24%	5,164
Mason	3,899	48.53%	4,125	51.34%	10	0.12%	-226	-2.81%	8,034
Okanogan	5,893	57.27%	4,385	42.62%	11	0.11%	1,508	14.66%	10,289
Pacific	3,423	50.52%	3,346	49.39%	6	0.09%	77	1.14%	6,775
Pend Oreille	1,573	53.58%	1,363	46.42%	0	0.00%	210	7.15%	2,936
Pierce	61,274	48.89%	63,400	50.59%	644	0.51%	-2,126	-1.70%	125,318
San Juan	1,186	68.83%	534	30.99%	3	0.17%	652	37.84%	1,723
Skagit	12,362	55.70%	9,812	44.21%	19	0.09%	2,550	11.49%	22,193
Skamania	1,268	52.94%	1,126	47.01%	1	0.04%	142	5.93%	2,395
Snohomish	42,157	52.14%	38,453	47.56%	244	0.30%	3,704	4.58%	80,854
Spokane	68,442	61.54%	42,674	38.37%	92	0.08%	25,768	23.17%	111,208
Stevens	4,493	60.00%	2,984	39.85%	11	0.15%	1,509	20.15%	7,488
Thurston	13,282	49.21%	13,670	50.64%	40	0.15%	-388	-1.44%	26,992
Wahkiakum	971	60.42%	635	39.51%	1	0.06%	336	20.91%	1,607
Walla Walla	11,302	64.23%	6,291	35.75%	2	0.01%	5,011	28.48%	17,595
Whatcom	17,846	57.02%	13,318	42.55%	132	0.42%	4,528	14.47%	31,296
Whitman	9,338	69.62%	4,071	30.35%	4	0.03%	5,267	39.27%	13,413
Yakima	28,678	54.79%	23,441	44.78%	226	0.43%	5,237	10.00%	52,345
Totals	697,256	55.77%	548,692	43.89%	4,326	0.35%	148,564	11.88%	1,250,274

==== Counties that flipped from Democratic to Republican ====
- Asotin
- Benton
- Clallam
- Cowlitz
- Douglas
- Ferry
- Grant
- King
- Kitsap
- Kittitas
- Okanogan
- Pacific
- Pend Oreille
- Skagit
- Skamania
- Snohomish
