= Charles J. McCann =

First president of the Evergreen State College

Charles J. McCann (February 24, 1926 – July 8, 2015) was the first president of The Evergreen State College in Olympia, Washington.

McCann was born in Bristol, Connecticut. He received a Ph.D. in English and organization and management from Yale University. He also received a master's degree from New York University.

Prior to becoming The Evergreen State College's president, McCann was a faculty and administrator at Central Washington State College beginning in 1956. Doctor McCann also taught as Professor of English on the faculty of Canisius College, a Jesuit college in Buffalo, New York; New Haven Junior College and was a teacher in the Hartford, Connecticut junior and senior high schools.

Appointed by the college's Board of Trustees August 15, 1968, following the Washington State Legislature's passage of the 1967 bill authorizing the college, McCann served as president until stepping down to join the faculty there in 1977, when he was replaced by former Washington governor Daniel J. Evans. Much of Evergreen's unique administrative and curricular structures are directly attributable to Charles McCann's vision and leadership. The college's main plaza is named in his honor.

While at Central Washington State College (now Central Washington University), he progressed from an associate professorship in English to Chairman of the Department of English, became Assistant to the President in 1965 and later became Dean of Faculty.

McCann died on July 8, 2015, of natural causes.
