= Perry Woodall =

American politician

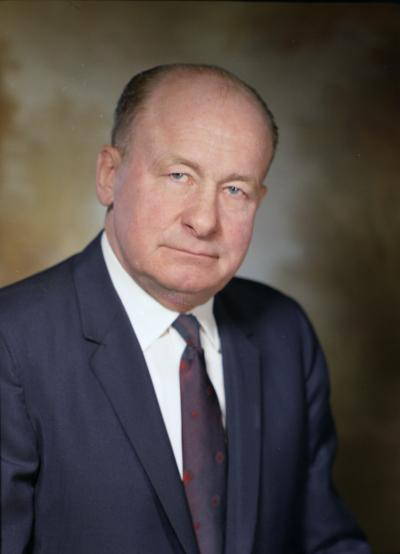
- Woodall in 1967

Member of the Washington Senate from the 15th district
- In office January 1, 1955 – January 13, 1975
- Preceded by: E. J. Flanagan
- Succeeded by: Sidney W. Morrison

Member of the Washington House of Representatives from the 15th district
- In office January 13, 1947 – January 8, 1951
- Preceded by: Charles F. Morrison
- Succeeded by: Cecil C. Clark
- In office January 9, 1939 – February 28, 1944
- Preceded by: C. A. Hughes
- Succeeded by: Charles F. Morrison

Personal details
- Born: Perry Benjamin Woodall; November 26, 1912 Buena, Washington, U.S.
- Died: April 25, 1975 (aged 62) Toppenish, Washington U.S.
- Party: Republican

Military service
- Allegiance: United States
- Battles/wars: World War II

Perry Benjamin Woodall (November 26, 1912 – April 25, 1975) was a U.S. politician. A Republican from Toppenish, began his legislative career in 1939 as a member of the Washington State House of Representatives. In 1957 he was chosen to fill an unexpired term in the Washington State Senate, and subsequently was reelected to four additional terms. Woodall also served as the Minority Leader in the Senate and participated in redistricting negotiations during the 1960s.
