= Daniel J. Evans =

16th governor of Washington (1925–2024)

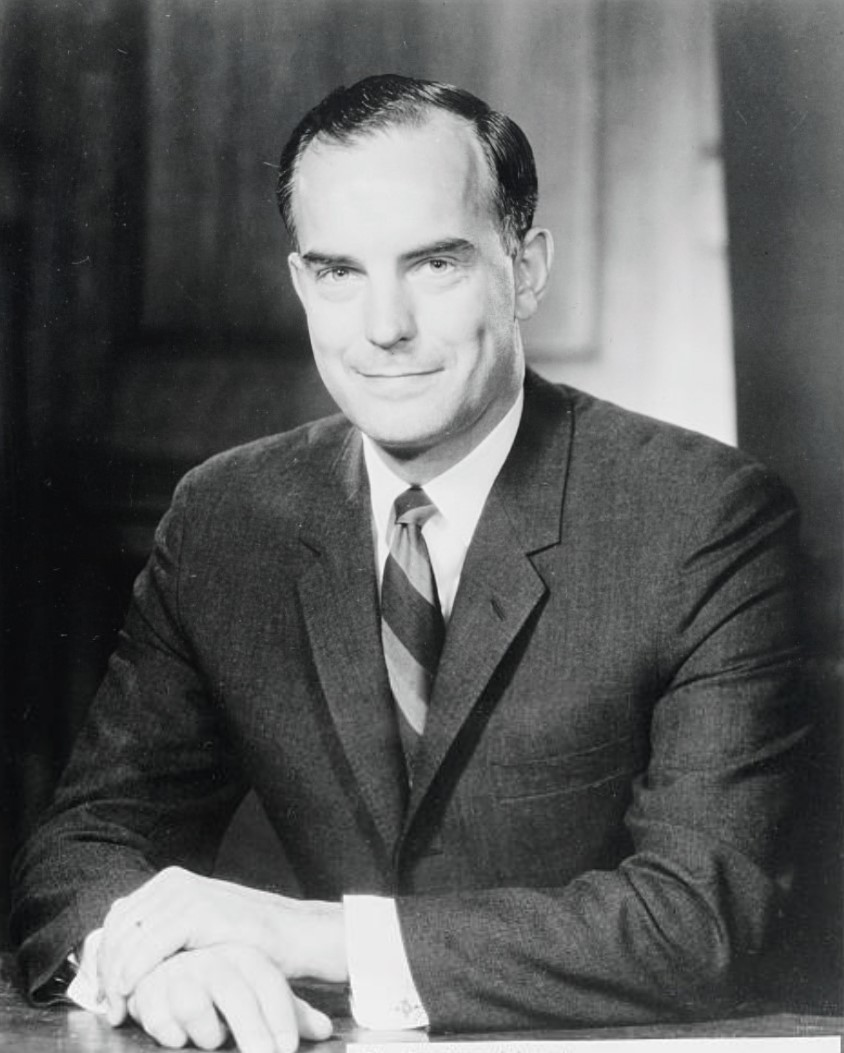
- Official portrait c. 1965–1968

United States Senator from Washington
- In office September 8, 1983 – January 3, 1989
- Preceded by: Henry M. Jackson
- Succeeded by: Slade Gorton

2nd President of Evergreen State College
- In office June 6, 1977 – September 8, 1983
- Preceded by: Charles J. McCann
- Succeeded by: Joseph D. Olander

Chair of the National Governors Association
- In office June 3, 1973 – June 2, 1974
- Preceded by: Marvin Mandel
- Succeeded by: Cal Rampton

16th Governor of Washington
- In office January 13, 1965 – January 12, 1977
- Lieutenant: John Cherberg
- Preceded by: Albert Rosellini
- Succeeded by: Dixy Lee Ray

Minority Leader of the Washington House of Representatives
- In office January 9, 1961 – January 11, 1965
- Preceded by: August P. Mardesich
- Succeeded by: John L. O'Brien

Member of the Washington House of Representatives from the 43rd district
- In office January 14, 1957 – January 11, 1965
- Preceded by: R. Mort Frayn
- Succeeded by: Newman H. Clark

Personal details
- Born: Daniel Jackson Evans; October 16, 1925 Seattle, Washington, U.S.
- Died: September 20, 2024 (aged 98) Seattle, Washington, U.S.
- Party: Republican
- Spouse: Nancy Ann Bell (m. 1959; died 2024)
- Children: 3
- Education: University of Washington (BS, MS)
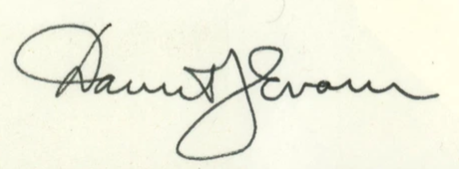
- Signature

Military service
- Allegiance: United States
- Branch/service: United States Navy
- Years of service: 1943–1946; 1951–1953
- Battles/wars: World War II; Korean War

Daniel Jackson Evans (October 16, 1925 – September 20, 2024) was an American politician who served as a member of the Washington House of Representatives representing Washington's 43rd legislative district from 1957 to 1965, the 16th governor of Washington from 1965 to 1977, the second president of Evergreen State College in Olympia from 1977 to 1983, and as a member of the United States Senate from 1983 to 1989.

After his service in the United States Navy, Evans was elected to the Washington House of Representatives in 1956. He then served as Republican leader of the House before being elected governor in 1964. He was re-elected two times more in 1968 and in 1972. Considered to be a moderate Republican, particularly on social and environmental issues, Evans supported Nelson Rockefeller for the Republican nomination for president in 1968 and refused to endorse Richard Nixon, despite giving the keynote address at that year's Republican National Convention in Miami Beach, Florida.

Evans was considered a potential candidate for vice president of the United States during his time as governor, but was never chosen. In 1983, he was appointed to the U.S. Senate following the death of Henry M. Jackson, and was elected in a special election in November and served until 1989, declining to run again. At the time of his death, he was the oldest living former U.S. senator and the second-oldest living former American governor.

== Early life and education ==
Evans was born in Seattle to Lester and Irma Alice (Ide) Evans, descended from a family that had first arrived in the Washington Territory in 1859; his maternal grandfather had served as a member in one of the first state senates in Washington. He was of Welsh descent. He grew up in the Laurelhurst neighborhood, and attended Roosevelt High School.

Evans was an Eagle Scout and served as a staff member and Hike Master at Camp Parsons as part of the Chief Seattle Council, a well known Boy Scout camp in Washington. As an adult, he was awarded the Distinguished Eagle Scout Award from the Boy Scouts of America in 1973.

After high school, Evans was in the United States Navy from 1943 to 1946. He first entered the V-12 Navy College Training Program and was stationed at the University of Washington (UW) in Seattle, but was transferred eight months later to a Reserve Officers' Training Corps program at the University of California, Berkeley. He did not see combat; he was deployed to the Pacific Ocean shortly after the end of World War II, as a commissioned ensign on a succession of aircraft carriers, before returning to UW in 1946.

Evans graduated from the University of Washington with degrees in civil engineering (Bachelor of Science degree in 1948 and a Master of Science degree in 1949). In 2007, UW gave him the distinction of Alumnus Summa Laude Dignitatus, the highest distinction the university confers on its graduates. He returned to the United States Navy, where he served from 1951 to 1953 before working as a structural engineer from 1953 to 1956. In the latter capacity, he helped draw the plans for the (now-former) Alaskan Way Viaduct in Seattle.

== Washington state representative ==
Evans served in the Washington State House of Representatives from 1957 to 1965 before being elected governor.

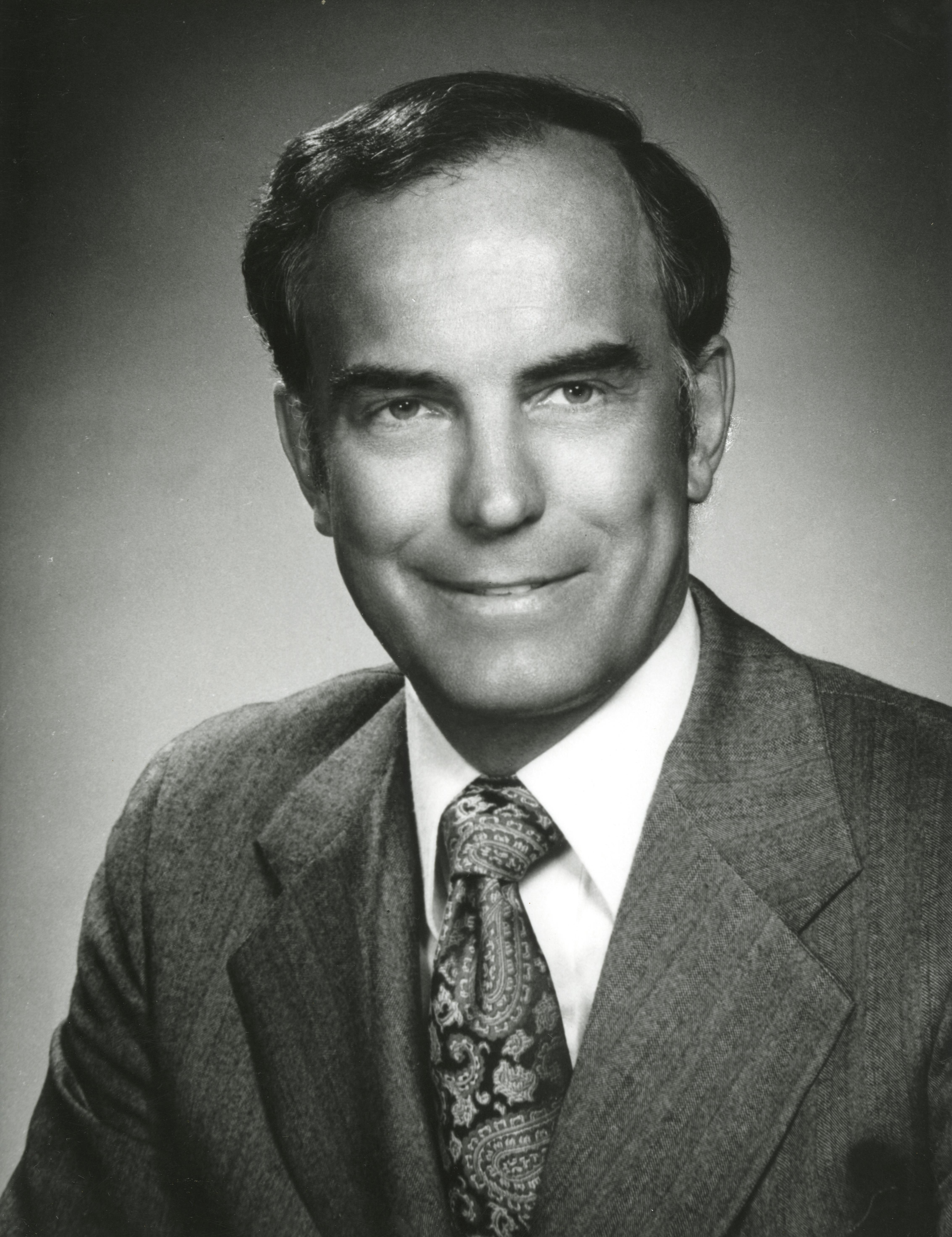
Evans during his tenure as governor

Despite being a Republican and a self-styled conservative, Evans became known for his administration's liberal policies on environmentalism (he founded the country's first state-level Washington State Department of Ecology, which became Nixon's blueprint for the United States Environmental Protection Agency) and strong support of the state's higher education system, including founding Washington's system of Washington Community and Technical Colleges. Additionally he signed a bill to legalize abortion in the first four months of a pregnancy and fought unsuccessfully for a state income tax, two more liberal positions.

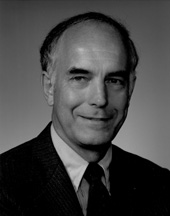
Evans as a United States Senator, 1985

== Governorship (1965–1977) ==
Evans announced his campaign for governor in December 1963. He was elected in 1964, defeating incumbent Democratic governor Albert Rosellini, and served until 1977, one of three to be elected to three terms in Washington state history, after Arthur B. Langlie and later Jay Inslee. A 1981 University of Michigan study named him as one of 10 outstanding American governors of the 20th century. He declined to run for a fourth term in 1976. Inslee joined both Langlie and Evans, becoming the third Washington governor to serve three terms with his re-election victory in 2020. Serial killer Ted Bundy was one of hundreds of campaign volunteers for Evans. Despite rumors, Evans never met Bundy. During the 1972 campaign, Bundy followed Evans's Democratic opponent around the state, tape recording his speeches, and reporting back to a campaign aide. A minor scandal later followed when the Democrats found out about Bundy, who had been posing as a college student and sneaking around wearing wigs, disguises, and a fake mustache as a campaign volunteer trying to gain information to help Evans' campaign.

From 1977 to 1983, Evans was the second president of Evergreen State College in Olympia, which he had created in 1967 by signing a legislative act authorizing the formation of the college. The largest building on the Evergreen campus is named after him, the Daniel J. Evans Library. He was suggested as a potential running mate for Richard Nixon in 1968, but he declined to be considered. Gerald Ford considered nominating him for the vice presidency in 1974, after he succeeded Nixon mid-term, and as a possible running mate for the 1976 election.

== United States Senate (1983–1989) ==
In 1983, Governor of Washington John Spellman appointed Evans to the United States Senate, to fill a seat left vacant by the death of long-time U.S. Senate member Henry M. Jackson. Evans won a special election later in 1983 against United States House of Representatives member Mike Lowry and filled the remainder of Jackson's unexpired term, retiring from politics after the 1988 elections. He was unhappy during his tenure in the Senate, writing in an April 1988 column in The New York Times Magazine, "debate has come to consist of set speeches read before a largely empty chamber" and adding that he felt demoralized by "bickering and protracted paralysis".

Evans voted in favor of the Passage of Martin Luther King Jr. Day establishing Martin Luther King Jr. Day as a federal holiday and the Civil Rights Restoration Act of 1987 in addition to voting to override president Ronald Reagan's veto. Evans voted in favor of Robert Bork's Supreme Court nomination to the Supreme Court of the United States, which failed when the U.S. Senate rejected Bork's nomination.

== Later life and death ==
After leaving the Senate in 1989, Evans founded his own consulting firm, Daniel J. Evans Associates. Governor of Washington Mike Lowry appointed him to the Board of Regents of the University of Washington in 1993; Evans served as the board's president from 1996 to 1997. In 1999, the Evans School of Public Policy and Governance at UW was named for him. He went on to work in media, doing an editorial weekly on KIRO-TV newscasts from the early- to mid-1990s. In 2012, he was listed as a director of the Initiative for Global Development. His autobiography was published in 2022. Evans became the oldest living former U.S. senator after the death of James L. Buckley in August 2023. On January 26, 2024, his wife of 64 years, Nancy Ann Evans died at age 90 from breast cancer.

Evans died at his home in Seattle on September 20, 2024 at age 98. He was the last living former U.S. senator born in the 1920s.

== Wilderness preservation efforts ==
Evans was a Boy Scout whose early experiences hiking in the Olympic Mountains nurtured a life-long love of the wilderness. He supported Congress' creation of North Cascades National Park in 1968. As governor, he persuaded president Gerald Ford to sign a 1976 legislation creating the Alpine Lakes Wilderness, when the United States Forest Service was urging a veto. Evans sponsored the million-acre Washington Park Wilderness Act as a U.S. senator and also legislation creating the national scenic area in the Columbia River Gorge. In 1989, he co-founded the Washington Wildlife and Recreation Coalition, with U.S. House of Representatives member Mike Lowry. In 2017, the Olympic Wilderness in Olympic National Park was renamed to Daniel J. Evans Wilderness, in his honor.

== Personal life ==
Evans and the former Nancy Ann Bell, a native of Spokane, Washington married on June 6, 1959 at Westminster United Church of Christ in the Cliff/Cannon neighborhood of the city. They had three sons; Daniel J. Evans Jr., Mark Evans, and Bruce Evans; and nine grandchildren.

== Statewide races in Washington ==
1983 U.S. Senate special election in Washington

- Dan Evans (incumbent) – 672,326
- Mike Lowry – 540,981

1972 Washington gubernatorial election

- Dan Evans (incumbent) – 747,825
- Albert Rosellini – 630,613

1968 Washington gubernatorial election

- Dan Evans (incumbent) – 692,378
- John J. O'Connell – 560,262

1964 Washington gubernatorial election

- Dan Evans – 697,256
- Albert Rosellini (incumbent) – 548,692

Party political offices
Preceded by Lloyd J. Andrews	Republican nominee for Governor of Washington; 1964, 1968, 1972	Succeeded by John Spellman
Preceded by Mark Hatfield	Keynote speaker of the Republican National Convention; 1968	Succeeded by Anne Armstrong
Preceded by Doug Jewett	Republican nominee for U.S. senator from Washington (Class 1); 1983	Succeeded by Slade Gorton
Political offices
Preceded by Albert Rosellini	Governor of Washington; 1965–1977	Succeeded by Dixy Lee Ray
Preceded by Marvin Mandel	Chair of the National Governors Association; 1973–1974	Succeeded by Cal Rampton
U.S. Senate
Preceded by Henry M. Jackson	U.S. Senator (Class 1) from Washington; 1983–1989; Served alongside: Slade Gorton, Brock Adams	Succeeded by Slade Gorton
Honorary titles
Preceded by James L. Buckley	Oldest living United States senator (Sitting or former); 2023–2024	Succeeded by Nicholas F. Brady
