= 1983 United States Senate special election in Washington =

- November 8, 1983
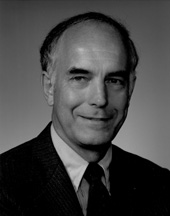

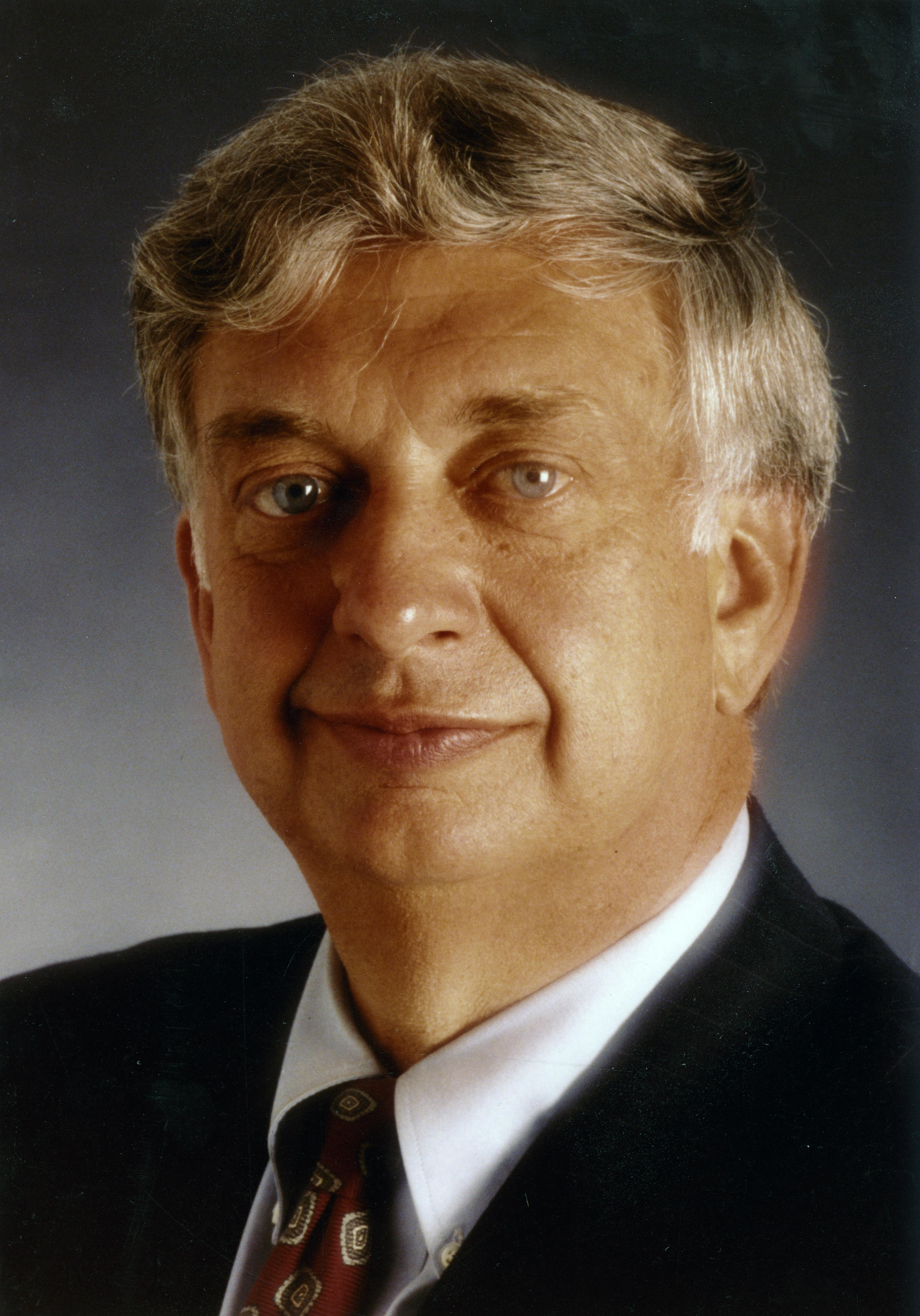
Nominee	Daniel J. Evans	Mike Lowry
Party	Republican	Democratic
Popular vote	672,326	540,981
Percentage	55.41%	44.59%
- County results Evans: 50–60% 60–70% Lowry: 50–60%
U.S. senator before election
Daniel J. Evans
Republican
Elected U.S. Senator
Daniel J. Evans
Republican

The 1983 United States Senate special election in Washington was a special election held to fill the seat which had been held by longtime Senator Henry Jackson, who unexpectedly died on September 1. Three-term former Governor Dan Evans was appointed by Governor John Spellman on September 8, and he won the special election over congressman Mike Lowry on November 8. Jackson had won a sixth term the previous year, so more than five years remained in the term.

The legislature ordered a primary election on October 11; it featured 33 candidates (19 Democrats, 13 Republicans, and one Socialist Labor), setting the modern record for number of candidates in a Washington U.S. Senate election.

As of 2026, this was the last time King County voted for a Republican U.S. Senate candidate. This was the first time since 1923 that Republicans held both Senate seats in the state.

== Blanket primary ==
=== Candidates ===
==== Democratic ====
- Mike Lowry, U.S. Representative from the 7th congressional district
- Charles Royer, Mayor of Seattle
- James R.F. Curdy
- Mike Olmer

==== Republican ====
- Daniel J. Evans, incumbent U.S. Senator
- Lloyd E. Cooney, former KIRO-TV commentator
- Larry Penberthy

=== Results ===
Blanket primary results
Party	Candidate	Votes	%
Republican	Daniel J. Evans (incumbent)	250,046	36.68%
Democratic	Mike Lowry	179,509	26.33%
Republican	Lloyd E. Cooney	133,799	19.63%
Democratic	Charles Royer	103,304	15.15%
Republican	Larry Penberthy	1,642	0.24%
Democratic	James R.F. Curdy	1,206	0.18%
Democratic	Mike Olmer	1,032	0.15%
Total votes		670,538	100.00%

== General election ==
=== Candidates ===
- Daniel J. Evans (R), incumbent U.S. Senator
- Mike Lowry (D), U.S. Representative from the 7th congressional district

=== Results ===
1983 United States Senate special election in Washington
Party	Candidate	Votes	%
Republican	Daniel J. Evans (incumbent)	672,326	55.41
Democratic	Mike Lowry	540,981	44.59
Total votes		1,213,307	100.00
Republican hold			

==== By county ====
County results
County	Daniel J. Evans Republican		Mike Lowry Democratic		Margin		Total votes
County	#	%	#	%	#	%	Total votes
Adams	2,118	64.99%	1,141	35.01%	977	29.98%	3,259
Asotin	2,486	58.38%	1,772	41.62%	714	16.77%	4,258
Benton	17,477	67.46%	8,429	32.54%	9,048	34.93%	25,906
Chelan	8,757	64.17%	4,889	35.83%	3,868	28.35%	13,646
Clallam	8,849	53.75%	7,613	46.25%	1,236	7.51%	16,462
Clark	19,924	50.24%	19,731	49.76%	193	0.49%	39,655
Columbia	879	57.68%	645	42.32%	234	15.35%	1,524
Cowlitz	9,012	49.07%	9,352	50.93%	-340	-1.85%	18,364
Douglas	3,926	63.14%	2,292	36.86%	1,634	26.28%	6,218
Ferry	697	45.92%	821	54.08%	-124	-8.17%	1,518
Franklin	4,107	56.35%	3,182	43.65%	925	12.69%	7,289
Garfield	649	58.36%	463	41.64%	186	16.73%	1,112
Grant	7,539	61.24%	4,772	38.76%	2,767	22.48%	12,311
Grays Harbor	7,977	42.50%	10,791	57.50%	-2,814	-14.99%	18,768
Island	8,862	63.82%	5,024	36.18%	3,838	27.64%	13,886
Jefferson	3,393	49.44%	3,470	50.56%	-77	-1.12%	6,863
King	244,145	55.94%	192,264	44.06%	51,881	11.89%	436,409
Kitsap	23,375	54.07%	19,854	45.93%	3,521	8.14%	43,229
Kittitas	4,193	52.54%	3,788	47.46%	405	5.07%	7,981
Klickitat	1,880	53.29%	1,648	46.71%	232	6.58%	3,528
Lewis	8,681	53.28%	7,613	46.72%	1,068	6.55%	16,294
Lincoln	2,428	59.94%	1,623	40.06%	805	19.87%	4,051
Mason	5,661	51.06%	5,426	48.94%	235	2.12%	11,087
Okanogan	4,480	53.58%	3,881	46.42%	599	7.16%	8,361
Pacific	2,601	42.77%	3,481	57.23%	-880	-14.47%	6,082
Pend Oreille	1,287	50.57%	1,258	49.43%	29	1.14%	2,545
Pierce	63,447	53.43%	55,291	46.57%	8,156	6.87%	118,738
San Juan	2,188	55.58%	1,749	44.42%	439	11.15%	3,937
Skagit	11,815	51.98%	10,916	48.02%	899	3.95%	22,731
Skamania	950	49.92%	953	50.08%	-3	-0.16%	1,903
Snohomish	55,515	55.77%	44,024	44.23%	11,491	11.54%	99,539
Spokane	49,893	55.54%	39,944	44.46%	9,949	11.07%	89,837
Stevens	4,499	57.50%	3,326	42.50%	1,173	14.99%	7,825
Thurston	24,752	58.24%	17,746	41.76%	7,006	16.49%	42,498
Wahkiakum	535	43.67%	690	56.33%	-155	-12.65%	1,225
Walla Walla	6,898	58.30%	4,933	41.70%	1,965	16.61%	11,831
Whatcom	17,932	52.42%	16,276	47.58%	1,656	4.84%	34,208
Whitman	6,184	62.48%	3,714	37.52%	2,470	24.95%	9,898
Yakima	22,335	57.97%	16,196	42.03%	6,139	15.93%	38,531
Totals	672,326	55.41%	540,981	44.59%	131,345	10.83%	1,213,307

== See also ==
- 1982 United States Senate elections
- 1988 United States Senate elections
