= John Patric =

American writer (1902–1985)

- John Patric during his college days
- Born: John Patric; May 22, 1902; Snohomish, Washington, US
- Died: August 31, 1985 (aged 83); Everett, Washington, US
- Resting place: Grand Army of the Republic Cemetery, Snohomish, Washington
- Other name: Pat
- Education: University of Washington; University of Michigan; University of Oregon; University of Texas at Austin; University of North Carolina at Chapel Hill
- Occupations: Journalist, writer
- Writing career
- Pen name: Hugo N. Frye, Simon Legree
- Language: American English
- Period: 1930–1945
- Genre: Non-fiction
- Subjects: Travel, consumer protection
- Notable work: Yankee Hobo in the Orient

Signature
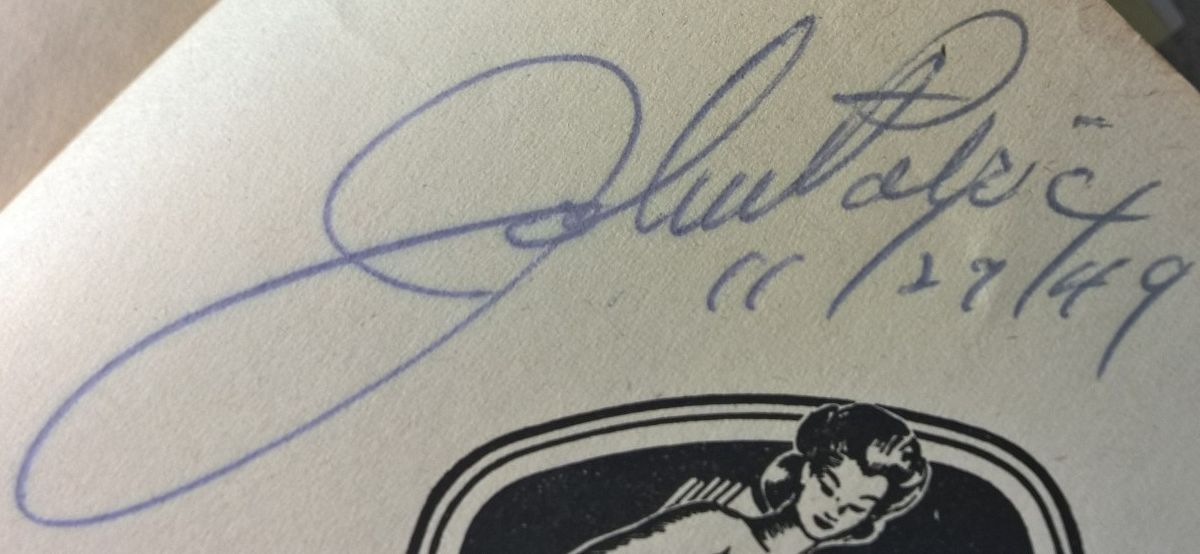

John Patric (May 22, 1902 – August 31, 1985) was an American writer. He was a contributing writer for National Geographic during the mid- to late 1930s and early 1940s and was the author of two books. His 1943 book, Yankee Hobo in the Orient, sold twelve million copies domestically and internationally in both hardcover and digest format. In the 1940s, he was one of the best-known Oregon writers.

He wrote a National Geographic feature article, Imperial Rome Reborn, about fascist Italy, and after writing on World War II shipyard labor practices for Reader's Digest, he gave testimony at a United States congressional hearing. Patric or his works are briefly mentioned by other writers on a diverse range of topics, including political history, an artist biography, an author biography, media history, cultural criticism, ship building, fascism, and Korean history.

In later life, Patric was an early influence on portrait artist Chuck Close, and a perennial political activist and satirical political candidate in his home state of Washington. Clayton Fox of The Olympian described Patric using phrases like, "the bearded bard of Snohomish", "gadfly of golliwoggs and gooser of governmental gophers," and "the pricker of political stuffed shirts, scourge of junkmailers, implacable foe of pollution and corruption, aider and abetter of bees, trees and ocean breezes".

== Childhood ==
Patric was born in Snohomish, Washington, on May 22, 1902. The ground floor of the family home in which he was raised served as the Snohomish public library, surrounding him with books and ideas from an early age. The Patric household consisted of John, his parents, and four siblings. His father, Arthur Noah Patric, originally from Mill City Pennsylvania, was a Snohomish hardware merchant. His mother, Emmeline Eleanor Crueger, originally from Racine Wisconsin, served as the town librarian.

At one point during his childhood, Patric "ran away, and hoboed [his] way from Seattle to Mexico and back, and nearly all railway men [he] met were kind to [him]. They shared their lunches with [him], they helped [him] locate other trains, and sometimes let [him] ride in the cab." Patric returned to Snohomish, and graduated from Snohomish High School as valedictorian and student body President of his senior high school class. He left home shortly thereafter to continue his education, writing, and travels. This period of his life is covered in more detail in his unfinished memoir Hobo Years.

== Education, career, and travels ==
=== Roaring twenties ===
A self-styled "hobo", Patric traveled extensively throughout the Roaring Twenties. He worked sporadically as a journalist, and studied at a number of universities across the United States. By 1920, 18-year-old Patric was listed among the "Who's Who of Washington Journalists" as a staff member of The Snohomish Tribune writing on assignment to travel with a friend named Norman Brown from the state of Washington to New York City. In 1922, Patric was writing for the American Insurance Digest.

Universities he attended during this time included the University of Michigan (1924–1925), the University of Oregon, the University of North Carolina at Chapel Hill, and several others in Idaho, Minnesota, and California. Patric proudly pointed to the fact that he had never actually received a degree from any of these institutions, and that he had been expelled from eight schools in the course of his academic career. These and many other experiences are recounted in his nearly complete memoir manuscript Hobo Years.

=== Depression era ===
==== Blunderbuss ====
Black eye, bruised lips

Nearing the height of the Great Depression, Patric studied writing and journalism at The University of Texas at Austin (1932–33) because it was "the cheapest school in the country, considering its facilities". Patric involved himself in campus politics, and he wrote a number of articles and editorial pieces (often under the pen name Simon Legree) for the University newspaper named The Daily Texan. Following a highly contentious student body election, Patric got into an altercation with the university's student body President Allan Shivers, who was both the primary target of Patric's "vicious" satire and the man who would later become one of the longest serving governors in Texas history:

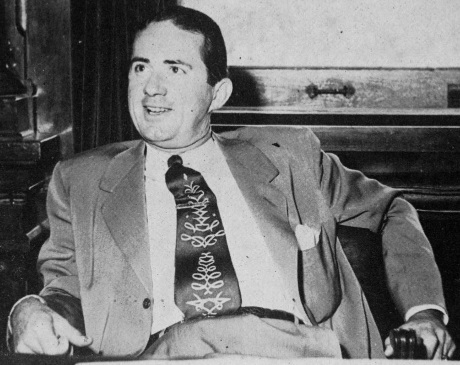
Allan Shivers, Governor of Texas

Patric(...) had been writing a Texan column, "Simon Legree," since December, consistently lambasting politicians, deans, Dekes, and Pi Phi's. He had an impish Schopenhauerish streak that caused him to delight in attacking anything pretentious or powerful. And he was quite good at it. Shivers did not escape his wrath. When Patric was ordered by his "boss" to stop writing about politics, he ran the order in a funeral-black border in his column for several days, then wrote another political column. Thereafter - no column. Not to be denied, Patric defied an administration threat of expulsion and printed "The Blunderbuss," a devilish rebel newspaper of ten pages that caustically insulted Shivers and his friends. Patric distributed "The Blunderbuss" on a Saturday evening (...) of May 13, 1933 (when the) two protagonists met and traded heavy blows; one was the tramp journalist who later wrote for Reader's Digest and National Geographic, the other was the student president who later did all right for himself, too. Shivers won the fight, but the selfdubbed "hobo" rushed forthwith to the police station and filed charges. On May 18, the University expelled him for writing "The Blunderbuss." Nine days after the fight, Allan Shivers paid a $1 fine and a $10.80 costs in Corporation Court for "making an affray by fighting together with John Patric(...) Shivers today, asked if he won, laughs, leans back in his chair, and says, "Of course, I'd say I did."

This episode is covered in great detail in Patric's work entitled Simon Legree's Book as well as The Austin Statesman and Austin Daily Dispatch newspaper articles of the time. Having already been expelled from multiple universities by this point in his academic career (perhaps as many as eight), the Blunderbuss controversy ended his time at The University of Texas at Austin. Less than two weeks later, Patric's abrupt departure from Austin was noted in an article in the Austin Daily Texan May 25, 1933, stating that police were searching for a missing person following an apparent abduction:

Mrs. C. E. Clinger, owner of the house, said she heard a commotion in Patric's room, after which a shot was fired, either in the hall of the house or on the front porch. She said she saw four men enter a car at the south side of the house. Police received the call at about 10 o'clock. Mrs. Clinger said she saw Patric earlier in the night. Patric's room was found in considerable disorder, with chairs and tables overturned, papers and clothes scattered about.

Any concerns about Patric's whereabouts or well-being disappeared when it was learned that Patric had departed Texas in favor of the West Coast in his recently purchased 1927 Lincoln sedan. Living out of his car and selling surplus passenger capacity to fellow west-bound travelers, he wrote of his travel and experiences in a series of letters from the road that were published in The Daily Texan. At turns light-hearted or biting, these letters addressed a number of aspects American life during the Depression, The final installment announced his arrival in Carmel, California, by October 10, 1933.

==== Friendly Journeys in Japan ====
Saving nearly $400 during the Great Depression selling rubber-stamp supplies while living in his Lincoln, Patric traveled to Seattle in order to book passage for Japan in 1934 aboard the NYK vessel Heian Maru. In her memoir I Married a Korean, American expatriate Agnes Davis Kim wrote of her chance ship-board encounter with Patric, during which his mischievous sense of humor nearly got them arrested for threatening to "assassinate the Mikado" (Emperor of Japan) before they even got off the boat in Yokohama, Japan. Patric's first-person narrative account of his two-year tour through 1930s Japan, China, and Korea on a very low budget were first published as a collection of articles for National Geographic under the title Friendly Journeys in Japan : A Young American Finds a Ready Welcome in the Homes of the Japanese During Leisurely Travels Through the Islands.

==== Libertarian views ====
In 1940, Patric spent a few months touring the country in his automobile with the writer and Libertarian political theorist Rose Wilder Lane, daughter of author Laura Ingalls Wilder. Patric and Wilder Lane's writings from this time expressed similar deep concerns about governmental expansion and "the rise of the state's role in the lives of individuals" as Franklin D. Roosevelt's New Deal struggled to help the nation recover from the Great Depression.

=== WWII era ===
==== National Geographic ====
Patric was still writing and traveling extensively for National Geographic while fascism and tensions were on the rise in Europe. Patric wrote profiles on Benito Mussolini's Italy and pre-war Czechoslovakia.

==== A Yankee Hobo in the Orient ====
When war broke out in the Pacific, Patric quickly reworked his National Geographic Friendly Journeys in Japan material on Asian travel to fulfill the public's demand for more information on Japan. The repackaged and expanded book became his most notable work. First published in 1943 by Doubleday Doran, Inc. under the title Why Japan Was Strong. The book was retitled Yankee Hobo in the Orient for the British edition by Methuen Publishing, and that title was used for subsequent editions.

Cover of 1951 paperback edition of Yankee Hobo in the Orient by John Patric, published by Frying Pan Creek press

The edition of June 20, 1943, of The New York Times featured a review of this work, stating that Patric displayed "qualities of good sense and poise and instinct for honest reporting sufficiently to give his excellent account of Japan's 'common man' the favorable reception it deserves." In the book's second month of sales, it had climbed as high as seventh place in a list of nationwide best sellers.

The September 1945 7th edition of the book (published now by the author's own "Frying Pan Creek" publishing firm), was substantially revised and illuminated by the author, adding detailed maps and numerous illustrations to accompany the significantly expanded narrative. By November 1945, Yankee Hobo had grown from the 1st edition's 22 chapters in 320 pages, to 45 chapters in 512 pages in the 8th edition. Writing in a foreword, the author described the pains taken in the layout and printing of his still-$2.50 hardcover edition, stating that due to its "especially fine typography and sturdy binding, it is the author's belief that physically, this book has become one of the best for the money ever published." Released only months after the August 1945 atomic bombings of Japan and Japan's surrender, the book now contained lengthy parenthetical asides conveying the author's thoughts on those events, as they pertained to his original work.

In the book and subsequent interviews, Patric emphasized his opinion that the most important point in the book was that a person should seek to reduce "by whatever peaceful means his ingenuity may devise, the power of government – any government – to tell him what to do." In accordance with this doctrine, Patric supported his deliberately modest lifestyle by directly selling his reprinted and personally-inscribed copies of the book from person-to-person, and town to town throughout most of his later life:

I have big pockets in my clothes; so that I can carry about six Hobos with me, or twelve if I wear an overcoat. I can, in a good small town, and in the course of errands that seem perfectly legitimate (and are, except that I extend their numbers by buying a meal in four restaurants-soup and a glass of milk in the first place; hot beef sandwich in the second; piece of cake in the third; 'just coffee, please' in the fourth). I can sell about 35 Hobos in a day of hard work without seeming to have tried to sell any. Each Hobo will take about ten hours to read and, because the buyers have met the author and have an inscribed copy, they lend the book more than usual. So I figure maybe that those 35 copies-that's a top day-would account for 2,000 hours of human time; time in which the reader is exposed to my reactionary poison in doses not too long to interrupt the narrative too much.

==== Wartime production ====
Patric's wartime contributions to the Reader's Digest stirred controversy, and in May 1943 he was invited to give testimony before the House of Representatives' Committee on the Merchant Marine and Fisheries executive hearings, in which he contended that labor union rules were having a negative impact on shipyard productivity during World War II, and made controversial recommendations to address them.

== Mid-later life ==
=== Frying Pan Creek Ranch ===
During the 1940s and early 1950s, Patric lived frugally on his remote 160-acre backwoods ranch at Frying Pan Creek, near Florence, Oregon. During the war, he was involved in various efforts on the home front to support the war effort, ranging from a drive to collect used nylons (to be sterilized and sent to China for use as bandaging material), to working with tire shops to retread discarded tires from the dump and fitting these "War Treads" to his automobile for a cross-country "endurance test". He made sporadic but regular appearances in the print media of this period, on book tours, commenting on events of the day in letters to the editor, and interviews in Libertarian and conservative publications such as the following excerpts from Faith and Freedom, March 1955:

Pat lives a spartan life because he rebels at government compulsion. "I have a mania for making personal expenditures with penurious frugality, while spending rather lavishly on anything that is a deductible expense, to the end that I personally pay the absolute minimum to the federal government without falsifying my own return." Once Pat turned down a lucrative job because "earning that much would have increased my involuntary financing of the further destruction with tax money of American freedom by the government in Washington."

Because Pat has reduced his love of money to such a low level, he feels he has reached a relatively high state of independence. Pat has arranged his life in such fashion that he doesn't punch a time clock, isn't tied to a desk, doesn't worry about a pay check, and doesn't have to stew about getting somewhere on time. Editors and publishers got to restricting his freedom, so he pulled out, resolved to write for only Publisher Patric and to publish for only Salesman Patric. In one of his asides in Hobo he says: "That's the nicest thing about a book-you can interrupt it anywhere to say any gosh-darn thing you please, without having some stuffed shirt editor chop out something which he is sure the readers won't like because he doesn't."

Should you ask [him why he lives as he does], he may tell you the story about King Dabshelim and his search for wisdom. Dabshelim summoned Bidpai, the wisest of men. King: "Make an abridgement, a condensation of my library, selecting only that which is important for me to know." After forty years of grueling research, Bidpai condensed the contents of the King's library. Bidpai reported to the King: "Well, sire, your books on religion, philosophy, morals and ethics, all they say is this: Love nothing but that which is good; and then do everything thou lovest to do. Think only that which is true, but speak not all that thou thinkest." King: "But the rest? The books on jurisprudence, planned economics, military strategy, sociology and political science? What wisdom have you found in them?" Bidpai: "All they say, sire, can be told in [one word]: 'Perhaps', sire."

=== Retirement ===
After many years of worldwide travel, writing, and life at Frying Pan Creek, Patric retired to his childhood home in Snohomish, Washington. Patric commenced publication of a weekly newsletter called The Snohomish Free Press later renamed The Saturday Evening Free Press under his pseudonym "Hugo N. Frye" (an allusion to the Cornell University "Hugo N. Frye" hoax). For many years, the newsletter espoused Libertarian views on events of the day. Under this pseudonym, Patric made regular appearances on Washington state election ballots over a period lasting more than two decades beginning in late 1960. He is listed on the Hoax Museum's list of satirical political candidates. Use of this pseudonym landed Patric in jail for a short while on a felony charge, until Patric's appeal to the State Supreme Court prevailed. On May 21, 1962, the prosecuting attorney filed an information charging Patric as follows:

That he, the said John Patric, in the County of Snohomish, State of Washington, on or about the 1st day of May, 1962, willfully (sic), unlawfully and feloniously did sign an initiative petition, to-wit: Initiative Petition No. 211, with other than his true name, to-wit: the name of Hugo N. Frye, contrary to the form of the statute in such case made and provided and against the peace and dignity of the State of Washington.

At the trial, it was established that Patric signed the proposed initiative petition as alleged, "Hugo N. Frye," and that he was a registered voter and registered to vote under the name of John Patric. When exhibit No. 1, the proposed initiative petition, was offered in evidence, he objected to its admission on several grounds, stating "I challenge the validity of this document." He testified that he signed the name as he did because it was his pen name; that most people knew him by his pen name, and that he never intended to defraud the Secretary of State or anyone. The jury returned a guilty verdict, Patric's motions for arrest of judgement and new trial were denied, however, and he was sentenced to serve up to 10 years in prison. On appeal, his conviction was overturned on 13 Feb 1964 in a split decision in which the majority held that "the document which John Patric signed never reached the status of a legal petition" because the sheriff had confiscated the petition as the prosecution's evidence exhibit No. 1, it was never delivered to the League of Women Voters for inclusion in their proposed initiative, and never submitted to the Secretary of State.

The Spokesman-Review praised the decision, saying "Hugo N. Frye may be a fictitious character. But in this case he symbolizes a spirit of individual freedom and independence that must always remain alive in a free America".

His inventiveness, of course, sometimes gets him into legal difficulties. But he has a formula for this kind of trouble, too: Be meek, act stupid, say 'sir,' and pretend a respect and—always—an awe that you do not ever feel.

=== Insanity trial ===
In May 1958, Patric's unconventional lifestyle and controversial newsletter attracted official attention. Pursuant to a complaint signed by Snohomish Police Chief Clarence Boyd charging Patric with mental incompetence, Patric waived his right to counsel during a Snohomish County Superior Court hearing, and "launched into a tirade against the county". Judge Ed Nollmeyer signed an order requiring 60 days of observation at the hospital, which led to more than four months in Northern State Hospital in Sedro-Woolley, Washington, and the Snohomish County jail. He eventually won his release in a subsequent hearing, while "acting as his own attorney, Patric based his defense on the contention that he had always been a screwball", wrote Jack O'Donnell of The Herald (Everett, Washington). The insanity trial is covered in great detail in this five part podcast produced by his local Everett Public Library.

=== Political candidacies ===
Owing to populist reforms advocated by the Washington State Grange movement and other allies, the unusual blanket primary system used by Washington between 1936 and 2003 enabled qualified candidates for partisan offices to list their party of preference without approval of the political parties themselves. Making use of this system, Patric, under the name Hugo N. Frye, ran five times as a Republican and eight times as a Democrat for federal or state political office. He also ran for numerous local offices in Snohomish County. Patric was known to make a point of paying his candidacy filing fee entirely with loose change and to happily supply unwary journalists who failed to check their facts with an untruthful list of his qualifications for public office, such as being an "FBI Special Agent", "mayor", "acting treasurer", "deputy sheriff", or "school board member" and being "married with three children". Talking to reporters in 1960, he explained his rationale for running for office: "Nobody has a right to criticize public officials as bitterly and cynically as I criticize them if he is not willing to file for public office." In the same interview, he distributed a written sheet of paper that was stamped at the top, "Patric for governor, temporary headquarters, Snohomish county jail, Everett, WA".

Patric ran in the following elections:

Date	Contest	Type	Party	Result	Percentage of vote
September 13, 1960	WA Governor	Blanket primary	Democratic	Lost	4.10%
September 18, 1962	WA US Senate	Blanket primary	Democratic	Lost	3.65%
September 15, 1964	WA Governor	Blanket primary	Democratic	Lost	1.18%
September 20, 1966	WA US House (District 2)	Blanket primary	Democratic	Lost	4.76%
September 17, 1968	WA Governor	Blanket primary	Republican	Lost	0.76%
September 15, 1970	WA US Senate	Blanket primary	Democratic	Lost	1.07%
September 19, 1972	WA Governor	Blanket primary	Republican	Lost	0.37%
September 17, 1974	WA US Senate	Blanket primary	Democratic	Lost	4.87%
September 21, 1976	WA Governor	Blanket primary	Republican	Lost	0.19%
September 19, 1978	WA US House (District 2)	Blanket primary	Republican	Lost	0.81%
September 16, 1980	WA US Senate	Blanket primary	Democratic	Lost	1.07%
September 14, 1982	WA US Senate	Blanket primary	Democratic	Lost	0.79%
November 10, 1983	WA US Senate	Blanket primary (Special)	Republican	Lost	0.03%

== Final years ==
From an interview with Northwest historian and Everett Public Library librarian David Dilgard on April 2, 2015:

John's lifestyle, including his diet, was highly idiosyncratic and he was a heavy smoker. The brief glimpses I got of his eating habits were startling. He apparently subsisted at times on canned mackerel and chocolate bars, washed down with large quantities of coffee. Although it may sound pretentious, his comparison of himself to the Cynic Diogenes was pretty convincing to me. Like Diogenes, his lifestyle was austere and he spent a lot of his time looking for honesty and virtue in his fellow man and loudly proclaiming that he had failed to find it. I did a memorial tribute to him some years ago that I titled "The Diogenes of Avenue D." (His house once stood on Avenue D in Snohomish.) I know he was in a care facility at the end of his life, no longer able to walk his usual rounds through the area. The loss of mobility alone might have killed him. He was fiercely self-sufficient and compulsively peripatetic and there's no way he could have survived being bed-ridden.

John's mom was a pretty fiery individual in her own right and I still hope for some examples of her writing to turn up. She seems to have been active in state politics, connected in some way with conservative forces allied to Governor Hartley in the 1920s and 30s. She got some attention a few years back when there was a webcam set up in the old Carnegie Library to watch for a ghost and some folks suggested that the specter was Emma. Others felt it was a former librarian named Catherine McMurchy. As far as I know the issue remains unresolved.

I wish we had some of Emma's writings but sadly we don't. She was born Emma Crueger and graduated from the UW in 1900. We've got John's own copies of his Saturday Evening Free Press, unfortunately not a complete run, but we've gradually added to it over the years and we have a pretty extensive collection of that publication. His unpublished autobiography Hobo Years (not to be confused with Yankee Hobo) details his experiences growing up in Snohomish. We've got drafts of chapters that were intended to go into that book, along with miscellaneous illustrations he commissioned for the project. While still a kid he learned to operate a linotype machine and he took lifelong pride in his skills at cranking out hot metal type, hence the esoteric epitaph on his headstone in the Snohomish GAR Cemetery- "A Little Eccentric, But Justified." I think he was always a journeyman typesetter at heart. Many thanks for helping to keep his story alive.

Patric died on August 31, 1985, at the age of 83 in Everett, Washington.

== Selected works ==
Plays

- Patric, John (1930). For Auntie's Sake. A play produced by The Carolina Playmakers.

Books

- Patric, John (1933). Simon Legree's book. Austin, TX. OCLC 25375905. A compilation of hoaxes and humor columns from The Daily Texan
- Riis, Roger William; Patric, John (1942). Repairmen will get you if you don't watch out. Garden City, NY: Doubleday, Doran & Co. LCCN 42013395. OCLC 1610784.
  - Reissued as: Riis, Roger; Patric, John (1949). Repair Men Will Gyp You (2nd ed.). Florence, OR: Frying Pan Creek.
- Patric, John (1943). Why Japan was Strong (1st ed.). Garden City, NY: Doubleday, Doran & Co. LCCN 43010041. OCLC 1659136.
  - Reissued as: Patric, John (1945). Yankee Hobo in the Orient (8th ed.). Florence, OR. LCCN 47003382. OCLC 2044145.
- Patric, John (1985). Hobo Years (unfinished memoir). Everett Public Library, WA: Unpublished Manuscript.

National Geographic

- Patric, John; Moore, W. Robert (April 1936). "Friendly Journeys in Japan : A Young American Finds a Ready Welcome in the Homes of the Japanese During Leisurely Travels Through the Islands". National Geographic.
- Patric, John; Pellerano, Luigi; Rogers, Bernard F. Jr. (March 1937). "Imperial Rome Reborn". National Geographic. 31 (3): 269–325.
- Partic, John; Balogh, R.; Hildenbrand, H. (January 1938). "Magyar Mirth and Melancholy". National Geographic.
- Patric, John; Culver, W. R.; Roberts, J. B.; Walker, H. (July 1938). "Roads from Washington". National Geographic.
- Patric, John; Moore, W. Robert (August 1938). "Czechoslovaks, Yankees of Europe". National Geographic.
- Patric, John; Stewart, B. A. (March 1940). "Italy, From Roman Ruins to Radio: History of Ancient Bridge Building and Road Making Repeats Itself in Modern Public Works and Engineering Projects". National Geographic.

Reader's Digest

- Taylor, Frank J.; Patric, John (March 1943). "'Featherbedding' Hampers the War Effort". Reader's Digest: 25–29.
- Patric, John (June 1943). "Remove Union Restrictions and Increase Shipyard Production by One Third". Reader's Digest.

Newspapers and pamphlets

- The Daily Texan, The University of Texas at Austin student newspaper.
- The Blunderbuss, "a devilish rebel newspaper of ten pages", self-published by Patric while attending The University of Texas at Austin.
- The Snohomish Free Press, later renamed The Saturday Evening Free Press, was a weekly newsletter edited, printed, and circulated by Patric.
