= Pearl Anderson Wanamaker =

American politician

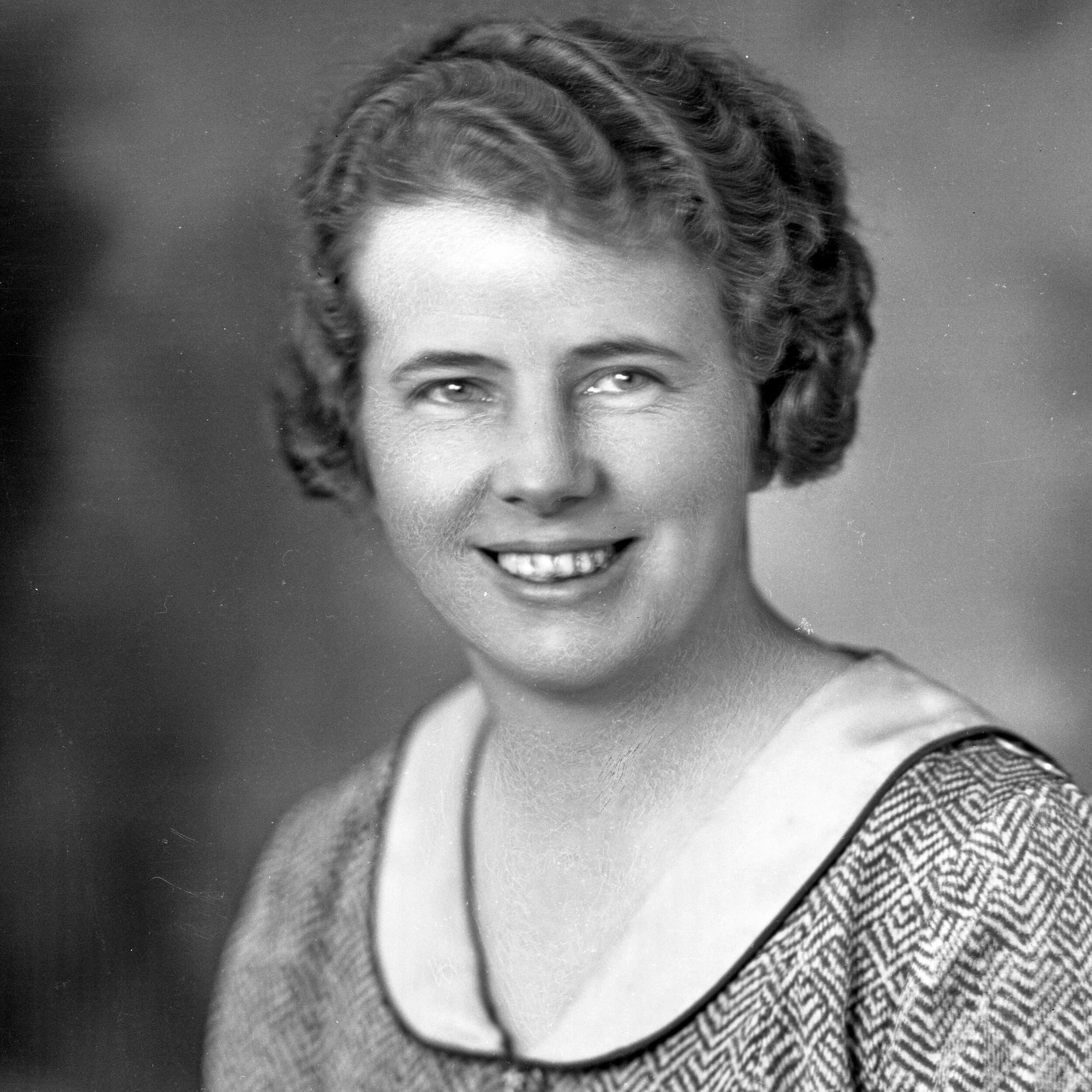
- Wanamaker c. 1929

Washington Superintendent of Public Instruction
- In office 1941–1956
- Governor: Arthur B. Langlie; Monrad Wallgren; Arthur B. Langlie
- Preceded by: Stanley F. Atwood
- Succeeded by: Lloyd J. Andrews

Member of the Washington Senate from the 38th district
- In office January 9, 1937 (appointed) – December 7, 1940 (resigned)
- Preceded by: L.E. Tewksbury
- Succeeded by: Howard S. Bargreen

Member of the Washington House of Representatives from the 38th district
- In office January 9, 1933 – January 9, 1937 Serving with J. F. Koehler (1933 – 1935); C. E. McIntosh (1933, resigned Dec. 7); D. N. Judson (1933 Ex. S.); Richard W. Bowden (1935 – 1937); Clemens M. Boyle(1935 – 1937)
- Preceded by: Fred A. Johnson; John Henry Ryan
- Succeeded by: Ernest A. Dore, Jr. Dan L. Guisinger; Chart Pitt

Member of the Washington Senate from the 50th district
- In office January 14, 1929 – January 12, 1931
- Preceded by: P. P. Custer
- Succeeded by: Albert Hoffman

Personal details
- Born: Pearl Anderson; January 18, 1899 Mabana, Washington, U.S.
- Died: December 4, 1984 (aged 85) Seattle, Washington, U.S.
- Party: Democratic
- Occupation: Teacher

Pearl Anderson Wanamaker (January 18, 1899 – December 4, 1984) was an American educator and politician. She served in the Washington State Legislature from 1928 to 1940. She was also Washington's Superintendent of Public Instruction from 1941 to 1957. She was president of the National Education Association.

== Early life and education ==
Pearl Anderson was born on Camano Island, at Mabana, Washington, the daughter of Nils Anderson and Johanna Wellman Anderson. The town of Mabana was named for her older sister, Mabel. Her parents were both immigrants, from Sweden and Finland; her father was a timber broker who also served a term in the state legislature. She attended the University of Washington, completing a bachelor's degree in 1922, after some years teaching; she also attended summer teacher training courses at Bellingham Normal School.

== Career ==
Wanamaker was a rural school teacher as a young woman, when World War I created an emergency demand for teachers. She was elected superintendent of schools for Island County in 1923. She served in the Washington state legislature for three non-consecutive terms, beginning in 1928. In 1935, she cut the ribbon to open the Deception Pass Bridge, a project she championed in the legislature. She ran unsuccessfully for a Congressional seat in 1936.

Wanamaker was appointed to a seat in the state senate in 1937, then won the seat in a 1938 election, but resigned in 1940 to become State Superintendent of Public Instruction. She held that office for sixteen years, through World War II and the post-war boom. Her tenure as state superintendent saw district consolidations in Washington, support for public school nurses, more public kindergartens, more school bus services, and the establishment of special education programs in the public schools. She opposed the use of state and federal funds for students enrolled in private and parochial schools. During the same period, 1941 to 1957, she was chair of the Washington State Library Commission. From 1946 to 1950, she served on the U.S. Education Mission to Japan, appointed by Douglas MacArthur. She testified at a Congressional hearing on federal aid for school construction in 1950. In 1956 she participated in the White House Conference on Education.

In 1956, Wanamaker defended the rights of a school counselor, Margaret Jean Schuddakopf, who was fired for invoking her Fifth Amendment rights in an inquiry about her Communist affiliations. A nationally syndicated radio commentator confused Wanamaker with Schuddakopf, and told his audience that Wanamaker had a brother who was a Communist. He admitted the mistake, and she won an apology and cash damages, but her career was ended by the scandal and ensuing lawsuits and countersuits. She lost her bid for re-election in 1956.

Wanamaker was president of the National Education Foundation from 1946 to 1947. She chaired the Washington State Council for UNESCO in 1950. In her later years, she served on the Washington State Arts Commission. Tacoma Community College opened the Pearl A. Wanamaker Library in 1966. She said at the opening, "I think this day sort of puts the top on a very interesting life." The Library was named for her because of the stand she had made in defence of Schuddakopf and for her support for founding the college. Other honors came from the American Association of School Administrators, Altrusa International, the Zonta Club of Seattle, Michigan State University, and Seattle B'nai B'rith.

Wanamaker wrote a textbook, Short Stories of Famous Women (1949).

== Personal life ==
Pearl Anderson married Canadian-born civil engineer Lemuel Avard Wanamaker in 1927. They had three children, Robert, James, and Joanna, born in 1932, 1933, and 1934, respectively; she remained in public office through her pregnancies, crediting "good posture...and a good girdle" for concealing her condition. She was widowed in 1964, had a stroke in 1974, and she died in 1984, in Seattle, aged 85 years. Her papers are held in the University of Washington Libraries.
