= Earl Coe =

9th Secretary of State of Washington

9th Secretary of State of Washington
- In office January 5, 1948 – January 16, 1957
- Governor: Monrad Wallgren; Arthur B. Langlie
- Preceded by: Belle Reeves
- Succeeded by: Victor Aloysius Meyers

Chair of the Washington State Democratic Party
- In office 1946–1948

Member of the Washington Senate
- In office 1944–1946

Member of the Washington House of Representatives
- In office 1938–1944

Personal details
- Born: Earl Sylvester Coe; 1892 Minneapolis, Minnesota, U.S.
- Died: May 23, 1964 (aged 71–72) Olympia, Washington, U.S.
- Party: Democratic

Earl Sylvester Coe (1892 – May 23, 1964) was an American politician who served as the ninth Secretary of State of Washington. Coe previously served as a member of the Washington State Legislature.

== Early life ==
Coe was born and raised in Minneapolis, Minnesota.

== Career ==
In 1913, he relocated to Bingen, Washington, where he worked in the shipping and lumber business.

In 1938, he was elected to the Washington House of Representatives taking the seat previously held by Christian Aalvik. In 1944, he was elected to the Washington State Senate. He was also an unsuccessful candidate for the United States House of Representatives in 1946. From 1946 to 1948, he served as the chair of the Washington State Democratic Party. He was a Democratic candidate for the 1956 Washington gubernatorial election, losing to Albert Rosellini. When Rosellini was elected governor, he appointed Coe to serve as secretary of state. He served from 1948 to 1957. He later served as the director of the Washington Department of Conservation.

== Death ==
Coe died in Olympia, Washington in 1964.
