= 1948 Washington gubernatorial election =

- November 2, 1948
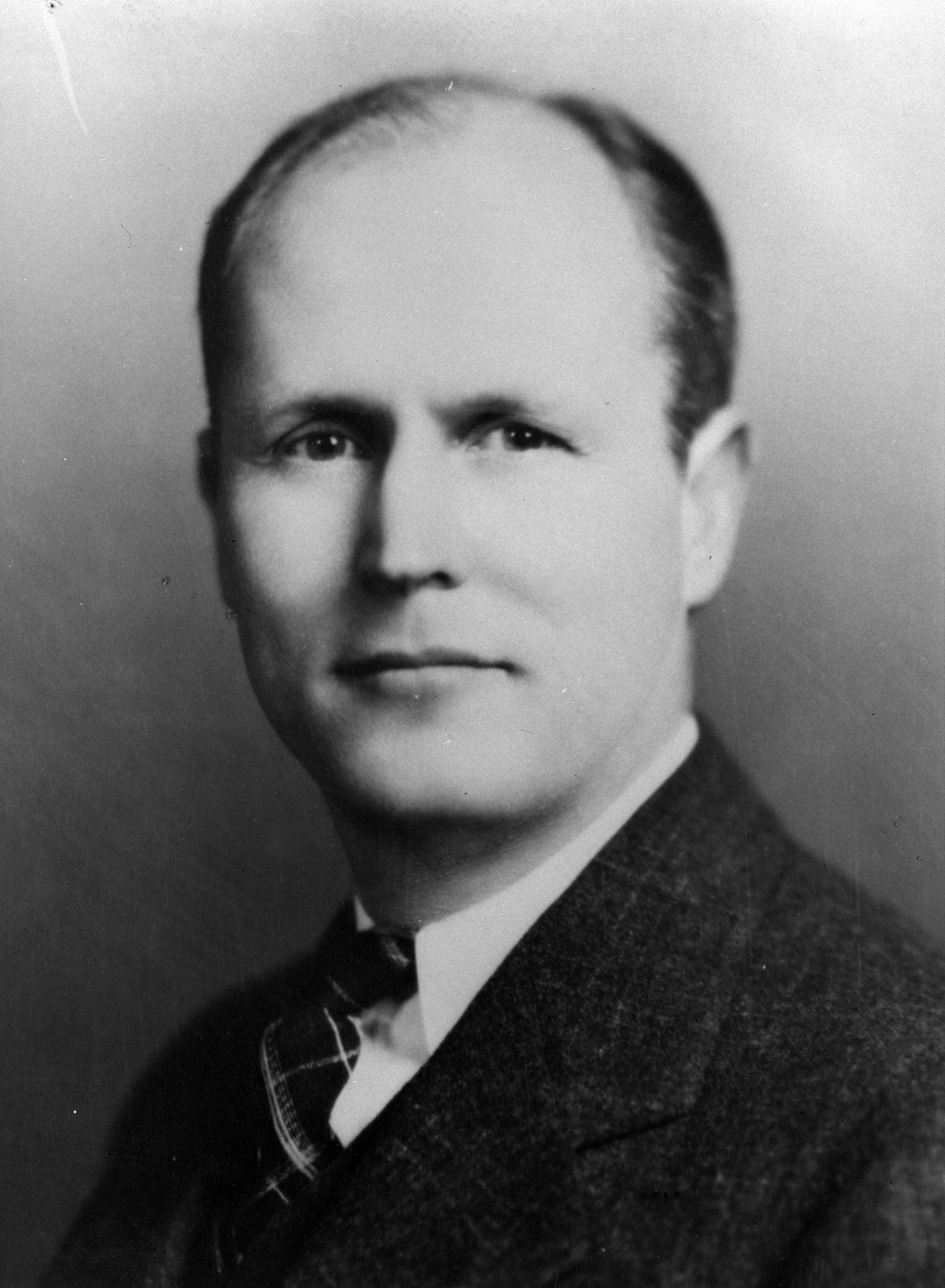

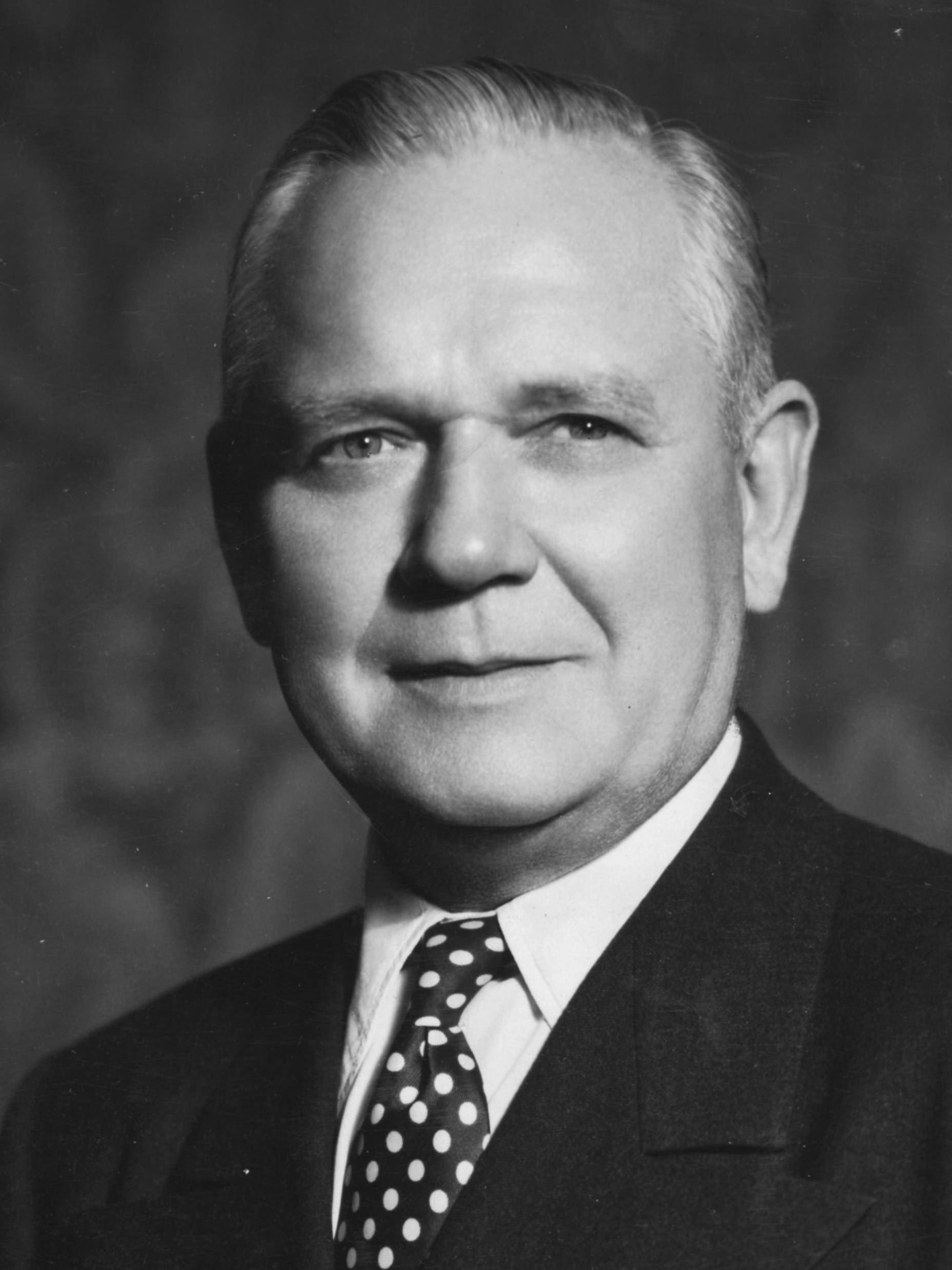
Nominee	Arthur Langlie	Monrad Wallgren
Party	Republican	Democratic
Popular vote	445,958	417,035
Percentage	50.50%	47.22%
- County results Langlie: 40–50% 50–60% 60–70% Wallgren: 40–50% 50–60%
Governor before election
Monrad Wallgren
Democratic
Elected Governor
Arthur B. Langlie
Republican

The 1948 Washington gubernatorial election was held on November 2, 1948. Republican nominee Arthur B. Langlie defeated incumbent Democrat Monrad Wallgren with 50.50% of the vote in a rematch of the 1944 contest.

== Primary election ==
The primary election was held on September 14, 1948. At the time, Washington used a blanket primary for nominations, with all candidates appearing on the same ballot and the highest candidate for each party being nominated.

=== Candidates ===
- Richard C. Beam (R)
- Clark R. Belknap (R)
- James M. Greene (R)
- L. R. Kemoe (R)
- Arthur B. Langlie (R), former governor
- Clarence D. Martin (D), state representative and former governor
- John T. McCutcheon (R), state senator
- Marius Rasmussen (R)
- George J. Smith (D)
- Robert F. Waldron (D), former state representative
- Monrad Wallgren (D), incumbent governor

=== Results ===
Blanket primary results
Party	Candidate	Votes	%
Republican	Arthur B. Langlie	206,851	38.29%
Democratic	Monrad Wallgren (incumbent)	165,775	30.68%
Democratic	Clarence D. Martin	89,890	16.64%
Republican	John T. McCutcheon	28,130	5.21%
Democratic	Robert F. Waldron	16,300	3.02%
Republican	James M. Greene	12,346	2.29%
Democratic	George J. Smith	11,730	2.17%
Republican	Marius Rasmussen	3,068	0.57%
Republican	Clark R. Belknap	2,925	0.54%
Republican	Richard C. Beam	1,822	0.34%
Republican	L. R. Kemoe	1,429	0.26%
Total votes		540,266	100.00%

== General election ==
=== Candidates ===
Major party candidates

- Arthur B. Langlie, Republican
- Monrad Wallgren, Democratic

Other candidates

- Russell H. Fluent, Progressive
- Henry Killman, Socialist Labor
- Daniel Roberts, Socialist Workers

=== Results ===
1948 Washington gubernatorial election
Party	Candidate	Votes	%	±%
Republican	Arthur B. Langlie	445,958	50.50%	+2.38%
Democratic	Monrad Wallgren (incumbent)	417,035	47.22%	−4.29%
Progressive	Russell H. Fluent	19,224	2.18%	
Socialist Labor	Henry Killman	780	0.09%	−0.08%
Socialist Workers	Daniel Roberts	144	0.02%	
Majority		28,923	3.28%	
Total votes		883,141	100.00%	
Republican gain from Democratic		Swing	+6.67%	

=== Results by county ===
County	Arthur B. Langlie Republican		Monrad Wallgren Democratic		Russell H. Fluent Progressive		Henry Killman Socialist Labor		Daniel Roberts Socialist Workers		Margin		Total votes cast
County	#	%	#	%	#	%	#	%	#	%	#	%	Total votes cast
Adams	1.834	69.36%	806	30.48%	4	0.15%	0	0.00%	0	0.00%	1,028	38.88%	2,644
Asotin	1,661	48.26%	1,726	50.15%	55	1.60%	0	0.00%	0	0.00%	-65	-1.89%	3,442
Benton	7,108	50.23%	6,986	49.36%	58	0.41%	0	0.00%	0	0.00%	122	0.86%	14,152
Chelan	8,675	57.32%	6,403	42.31%	55	0.36%	1	0.01%	0	0.00%	2,272	15.01%	15,134
Clallam	4,723	47.94%	4,876	49.50%	248	2.52%	3	0.03%	1	0.01%	-153	-1.55%	9,851
Clark	13,878	47.31%	14,819	50.51%	621	2.12%	16	0.05%	2	0.01%	-941	-3.21%	29,336
Columbia	1,344	64.52%	733	35.19%	6	0.29%	0	0.00%	0	0.00%	611	29.33%	2,083
Cowlitz	8,486	45.86%	9,614	51.96%	394	2.13%	7	0.04%	2	0.01%	-1,128	-6.10%	18,503
Douglas	2,259	57.05%	1,689	42.65%	10	0.25%	0	0.00%	2	0.05%	570	14.39%	3,960
Ferry	532	40.83%	752	57.71%	19	1.46%	0	0.00%	0	0.00%	-220	-16.88%	1,303
Franklin	2,013	49.70%	2,022	49.93%	13	0.32%	1	0.02%	1	0.02%	-9	-0.22%	4,050
Garfield	961	63.73%	544	36.07%	3	0.20%	0	0.00%	0	0.00%	417	27.65%	1,508
Grant	2,486	40.47%	3,625	59.01%	32	0.52%	0	0.00%	0	0.00%	-1,139	-18.54%	6,143
Grays Harbor	10,116	45.02%	11,716	52.14%	588	2.62%	48	0.21%	2	0.01%	-1,600	-7.12%	22,470
Island	2,021	56.05%	1,529	42.40%	56	1.55%	0	0.00%	0	0.00%	492	13.64%	3,606
Jefferson	1,780	49.50%	1,755	48.80%	60	1.67%	1	0.03%	0	0.00%	25	0.70%	3,596
King	146,062	51.58%	129,149	45.61%	7,483	2.64%	394	0.14%	68	0.02%	16,913	5.97%	283,156
Kitsap	12,526	41.49%	17,123	56.71%	532	1.76%	11	0.04%	0	0.00%	-4,597	-15.23%	30,192
Kittitas	3,824	46.42%	4,318	52.42%	95	1.15%	1	0.01%	0	0.00%	-494	-6.00%	8,238
Klickitat	2,269	56.80%	1,701	42.58%	15	0.38%	10	0.25%	0	0.00%	568	14.22%	3,995
Lewis	10,001	57.01%	7,302	41.63%	234	1.33%	3	0.02%	1	0.01%	2,699	15.39%	17,541
Lincoln	3,134	65.10%	1,666	34.61%	14	0.29%	0	0.00%	0	0.00%	1,468	30.49%	4,814
Mason	3,079	48.47%	3,082	48.51%	191	3.01%	0	0.00%	1	0.02%	-3	-0.05%	6,353
Okanogan	5,121	52.44%	4,597	47.08%	45	0.46%	1	0.01%	1	0.01%	524	5.37%	9,765
Pacific	3,376	49.94%	3,187	47.14%	194	2.87%	3	0.04%	0	0.00%	189	2.80%	6,760
Pend Oreille	1,298	52.00%	1,167	46.75%	31	1.24%	0	0.00%	0	0.00%	131	5.25%	2,496
Pierce	40,602	45.84%	44,896	50.69%	2,927	3.30%	117	0.13%	36	0.04%	-4,294	-4.85%	88,578
San Juan	873	56.21%	657	42.31%	23	1.48%	0	0.00%	0	0.00%	216	13.91%	1,553
Skagit	9,090	50.41%	8,434	46.77%	499	2.77%	9	0.05%	0	0.00%	656	3.64%	18,032
Skamania	818	45.72%	949	53.05%	21	1.17%	1	0.06%	0	0.00%	-131	-7.32%	1,789
Snohomish	19,760	43.59%	23,627	52.13%	1,866	4.12%	70	0.15%	4	0.01%	-3,867	-8.53%	45,237
Spokane	45,066	51.59%	41,301	47.28%	944	1.08%	32	0.04%	9	0.01%	3,765	4.31%	87,352
Stevens	3,666	50.55%	3,489	48.11%	95	1.31%	2	0.03%	0	0.00%	177	2.44%	7,252
Thurston	10,512	51.15%	9,566	46.55%	465	2.26%	5	0.02%	3	0.01%	946	4.60%	20,551
Wahkiakum	775	50.06%	753	48.64%	13	0.84%	7	0.45%	0	0.00%	22	1.42%	1,548
Walla Walla	8,847	58.91%	6,098	40.60%	73	0.49%	0	0.00%	0	0.00%	2,749	18.30%	15,018
Whatcom	14,199	51.09%	12,626	45.43%	941	3.39%	23	0.08%	3	0.01%	1,573	5.66%	27,792
Whitman	7,908	63.68%	4,436	35.72%	72	0.58%	1	0.01%	1	0.01%	3,472	27.96%	12,418
Yakima	23,275	56.99%	17,316	42.40%	229	0.56%	13	0.03%	7	0.02%	5,959	14.59%	40,840
Totals	445,958	50.50%	417,035	47.22%	19,224	2.18%	780	0.09%	144	0.02%	28,923	3.28%	883,141

==== Counties that flipped from Democratic to Republican ====
- Jefferson
- King
- Pacific
- Skagit
- Wahkiakum

==== Counties that flipped from Republican to Democratic ====
- Asotin
- Kittitas
