= Victor Aloysius Meyers =

11th Lieutenant Governor of Washington

Victor A. Meyers
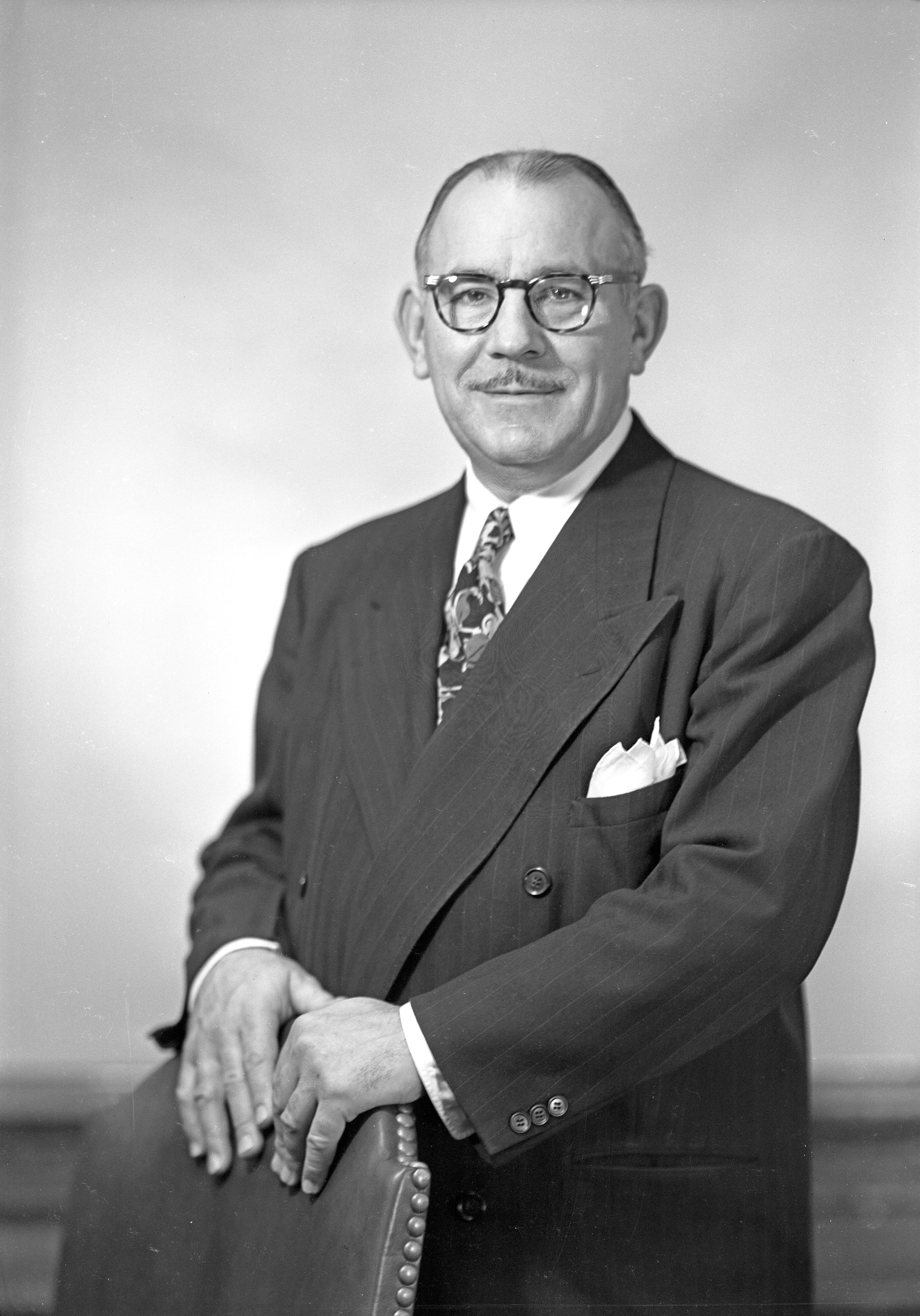
- Meyers in 1951

10th Secretary of State of Washington
- In office January 16, 1957 – January 13, 1965
- Governor: Albert Rosellini
- Preceded by: Earl Coe
- Succeeded by: Lud Kramer

11th Lieutenant Governor of Washington
- In office January 11, 1933 – January 14, 1953
- Governor: Clarence D. Martin; Arthur B. Langlie; Monrad Wallgren
- Preceded by: John Arthur Gellatly
- Succeeded by: Emmett T. Anderson

Personal details
- Born: Victor Aloysius Meyers; September 7, 1898 Little Falls, Minnesota, U.S.
- Died: May 28, 1991 (aged 93) Seattle, Washington, U.S.
- Party: Democratic
- Occupation: Politician, musician

Victor Aloysius Meyers (September 7, 1898 – May 28, 1991) was an American politician and jazz bandleader. He served for 20 years as the 11th Lieutenant Governor of Washington and an additional eight years as the tenth Secretary of State of Washington. He was the first Democratic Lieutenant Governor of Washington.

== Early life and education ==
Born in Little Falls, Minnesota, Meyers was the fifteenth of 16 children. His mother was a pianist; his father Morrison County treasurer. Meyers became a multi-instrumental musician, with drums as his first instrument. His family moved to Oregon. In his teens, Meyers played drums professionally at a Seaside, Oregon hotel.

== Career ==
=== Music ===
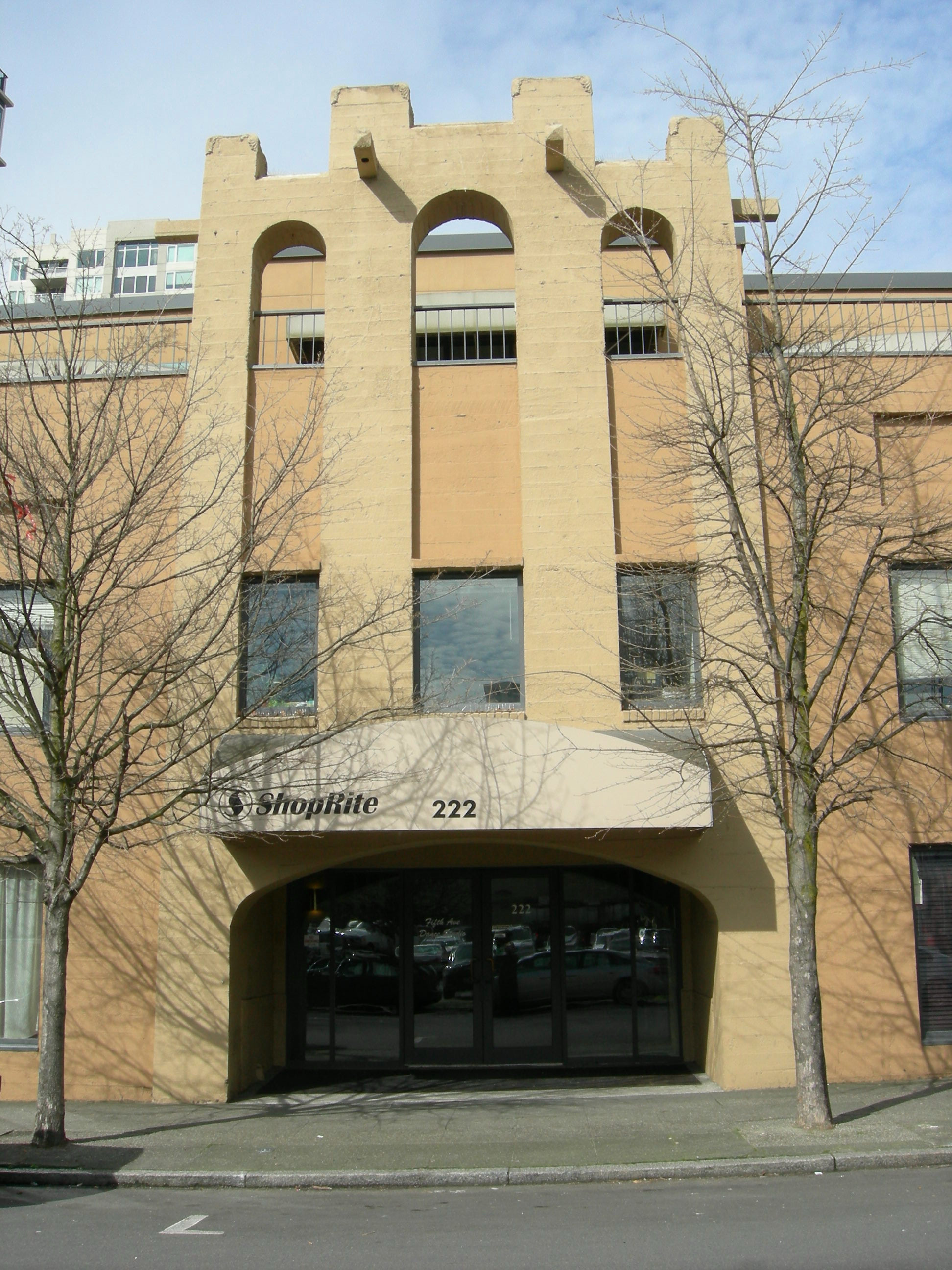
The former Trianon Ballroom, now an office building.

At age 21, he put together a 10-piece band. In 1919 Meyers was given a two-year contract to lead the house band at the Rose Room in Seattle's Hotel Butler. The band enjoyed local success, and Butler's contract continued to be renewed. In 1923, Brunswick Records chose the group to record during the record company's West Coast field trip, the first records billed as "Vic Meyers Hotel Butler Orchestra". The band made further series of recordings for Brunswick the following year, and toured nationally before settling in Seattle, where he played on the radio. In 1927 his band first got a residency at the Trianon Ballroom in the Belltown/Denny Regrade area north of downtown Seattle's leading dance venue of the time, well known for its flouting of Prohibition. the same year the band made the first of a series of recordings for Columbia Records which would continue through 1929.Articles p4

Meyers' compositions as a musician included "Ada", composed with Harold Weeks and Danny Cann; "Isle of Dreams", composed with Weeks and Oliver Wallace; and "I'm Happy Now That You're Gone", composed with Al Thompson and Harry Von Tilzer.

=== Early political career ===
By 1932, Meyers had left the Butler Hotel and was holding forth at his own Club Victor back up in the Regrade, often nearly broke, and continuing to get in trouble with the authorities enforcing the Prohibition laws. Covered constantly by the local press, he was one of the city's best-known figures. That year was a local election year, and assistant city editor Doug Welch and some other newspapermen at the Seattle Times decided to urge Meyers to enter the city's nonpartisan spring 1932 mayoral race against business candidate John F. Dore (a trial lawyer) and a field of "fatuous has-beens and never-wases". Welch saw Meyers as a joke candidate he could use as an anchor for satiric stories on the race.

The Times trumpeted Meyers entry into the race with an eight-column page one headline, and gave him daily coverage. Meyers chose the meaningless campaign slogan "Watch 'er Click with Vic". He drove a beer wagon around town—this in the midst of Prohibition—with his band playing "Happy Days Are Here Again"; he started out campaigning in shirt sleeves, to prove he was not a representative of the vested interests; later he campaigned in a tuxedo, silk scarf, top hat, velvet-lapeled overcoat, and kid gloves. His speeches were often parodies of Dore's. He came out in favor of graft. His answer to the problems of Seattle's ailing streetcar system was to add hostesses. He appeared at a Shriners' candidates' forum at the Olympic Hotel dressed as Mahatma Gandhi, leading a goat, sipping goat's milk and munching raw carrots, and wearing gold-rimmed eyeglasses.

In the mayoral election, Meyers finished sixth in a field of ten.

=== Lieutenant governor ===
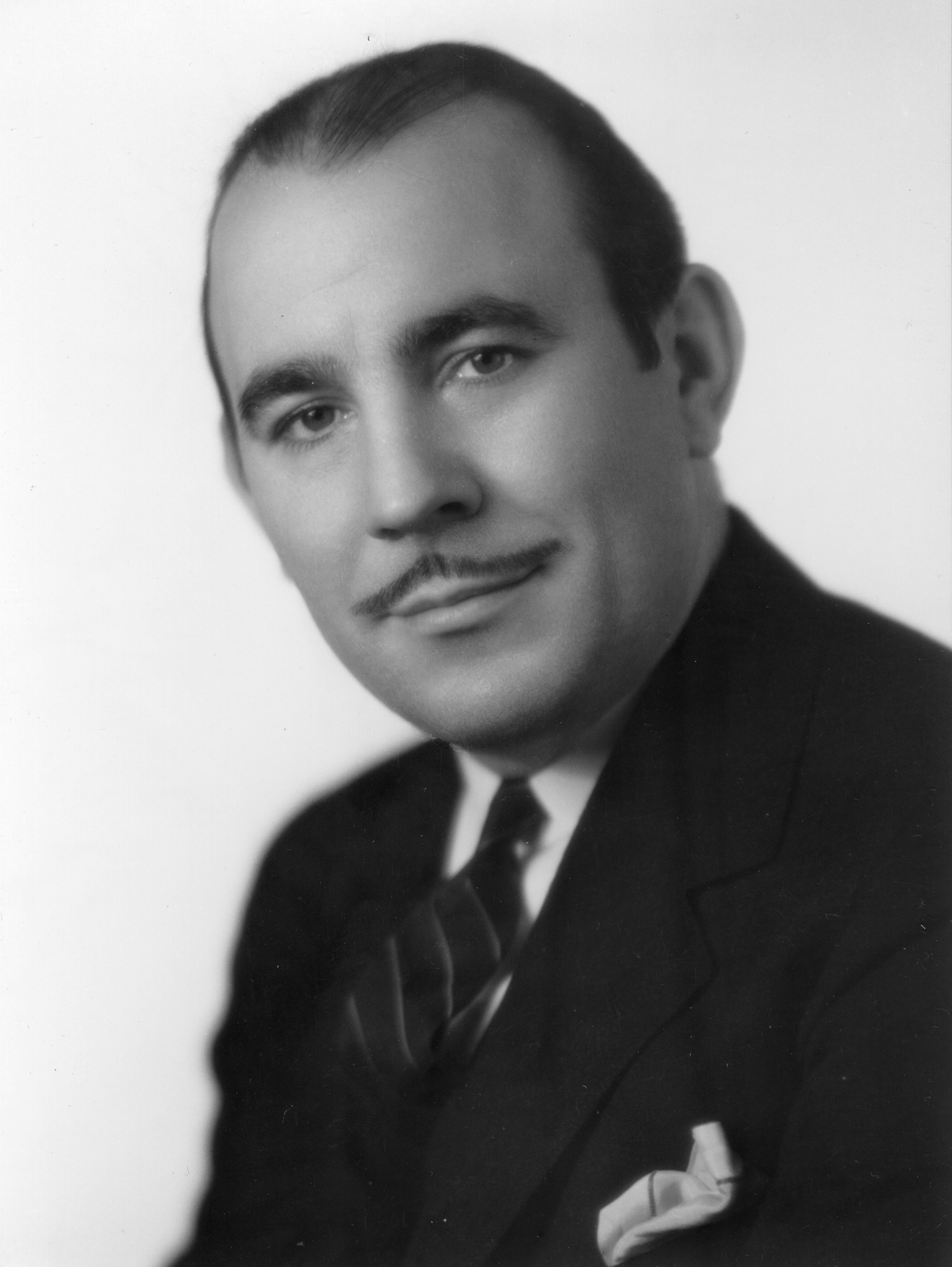
Meyers's official Lieutenant Gubernatorial portrait, 1933

After briefly going back to being a full-time bandleader, he decided to run for lieutenant governor in the fall 1932 election, this time without Welch and the Times. Actually, he originally decided to run for governor, but didn't want to pony up the $60 filing fee; the filing fee for lieutenant governor was only $12. He continued to use humor (for example, repeating the Gandhi bit) and music (playing saxophone at his own campaign appearances), but also campaigned more seriously. He appeared on an Indian reservation talking about how the Indians were not allowed to vote. He came out for pensions, child welfare, and unemployment compensation. He gained the Democratic nomination in the September primary, thereby becoming the running mate to Clarence D. Martin; both went on to win in November in conjunction with Franklin D. Roosevelt's landslide victory in the presidential election. Meyers and his band played at the inaugural ball.

Meyers first ran for lieutenant governor without even being clear on the duties of the office. He became known as a leader of the left wing of the state Democratic Party, often putting him at odds with the more centrist Governor Martin, but getting on well with rising star Albert D. Rosellini. When, in the midst of the Great Depression, the left-wing Unemployed Citizens' League marched to Olympia, Washington to confront Governor Martin, Meyers opened his home to the marchers. He won five terms as Lt. Governor, which at the time made him the longest served occupant of that office. He lost a bid for a sixth term to Emmett T. Anderson in 1952, during the Eisenhower landslide.

=== Secretary of State ===
During that time, he twice again ran unsuccessfully for mayor of Seattle, losing to Arthur B. Langlie in 1938 and to William F. Devin in 1946. He later ran successfully for Secretary of State of Washington in 1956, and again in 1960. He lost a third bid in 1964 due to being implicated in a scandal related to the mishandling of the petition for an anti-gambling initiative. He entered the race to regain his position as secretary of state in 1976, but withdrew for health reasons. Meyers' son Victor Aloysius Meyers, Jr. served two terms in the state legislature (elected from the 31st District in 1958 and 1960) and ran unsuccessfully for state secretary of state in 1980, before dying in 1981 at the age of 57. Meyers, Sr. was the last Democrat in the state to hold this position until Steve Hobbs was appointed (and later elected outright) to it in November 2021.

==== Historical archives ====
While serving as Washington's Secretary of State, Meyers published a booklet entitled Historical Highlights. The booklet is written from a political perspective as tied to events within local communities and populations. Meyers summarized events beginning with the Spanish Expeditions in 1543 to the first territorial governor, Isaac Stevens, in 1853, before adding in-depth state history from 1853 to 1959. Territorial and State Governors' influences and contributions during periods in office serve as the basis of historical documentation with details pertaining to legislation and the citizenry.

=== Later career ===
In the years after World War II, Meyers also took a shot at the prefabricated housing business, partnering with his brother Joseph Meyers and State Senator Howard Bargreen of Everett, Washington in a venture selling "Honeymoon GI homes". Many of these still stand in Tacoma, Washington.

Late in life, he managed a golf course and apartment complex in Kent, Washington. His last years were spent in a nursing home.

== Honors ==
In 1977, the Washington legislature designated the golf course at Sun Lakes State Park as the "Vic Meyers Golf Course" and renamed Rainbow Lake as "Vic Meyers Lake". The park had been a pet project of his. Considered too out-of-the-way when Meyers first backed it, "Vic's Folly" is now one of the busiest parks in the state.

Meyers is a member of the Northwest Music Association Hall of Fame.

== Partial discography ==
- "Mean Mean Mama / Shake It and Break It", Brunswick 2501 (1923)
- "Helen Gone / Springtime Rag", Brunswick 2630 (1924)
- "Beets and Turnips" / "Weary Blues", Brunswick 2664 (1924)
- "Heartbroken" / "Burmalone", Brunswick 2685 (1924)
- "Mean Looks" / "Tell Me What To Do", Brunswick 2733 (1924)
- "The Only, Only One For Me" / "No Wonder (That I Love You)", Brunswick 2774 (1924)
- "Sad" / "Shimmy", Brunswick 2800 (1924)
- "Congratulations" / "Melancholy" Columbia 2026D
- "Bow Down to Washington" Columbia (1928)

Political offices
Preceded by John A. Gellatly	Lieutenant Governor of Washington; 1933–1953	Succeeded by Emmett T. Anderson
Preceded by Earl Coe	Secretary of State of Washington; 1957–1965	Succeeded by Lud Kramer
