= 1956 Washington gubernatorial election =

- November 6, 1956
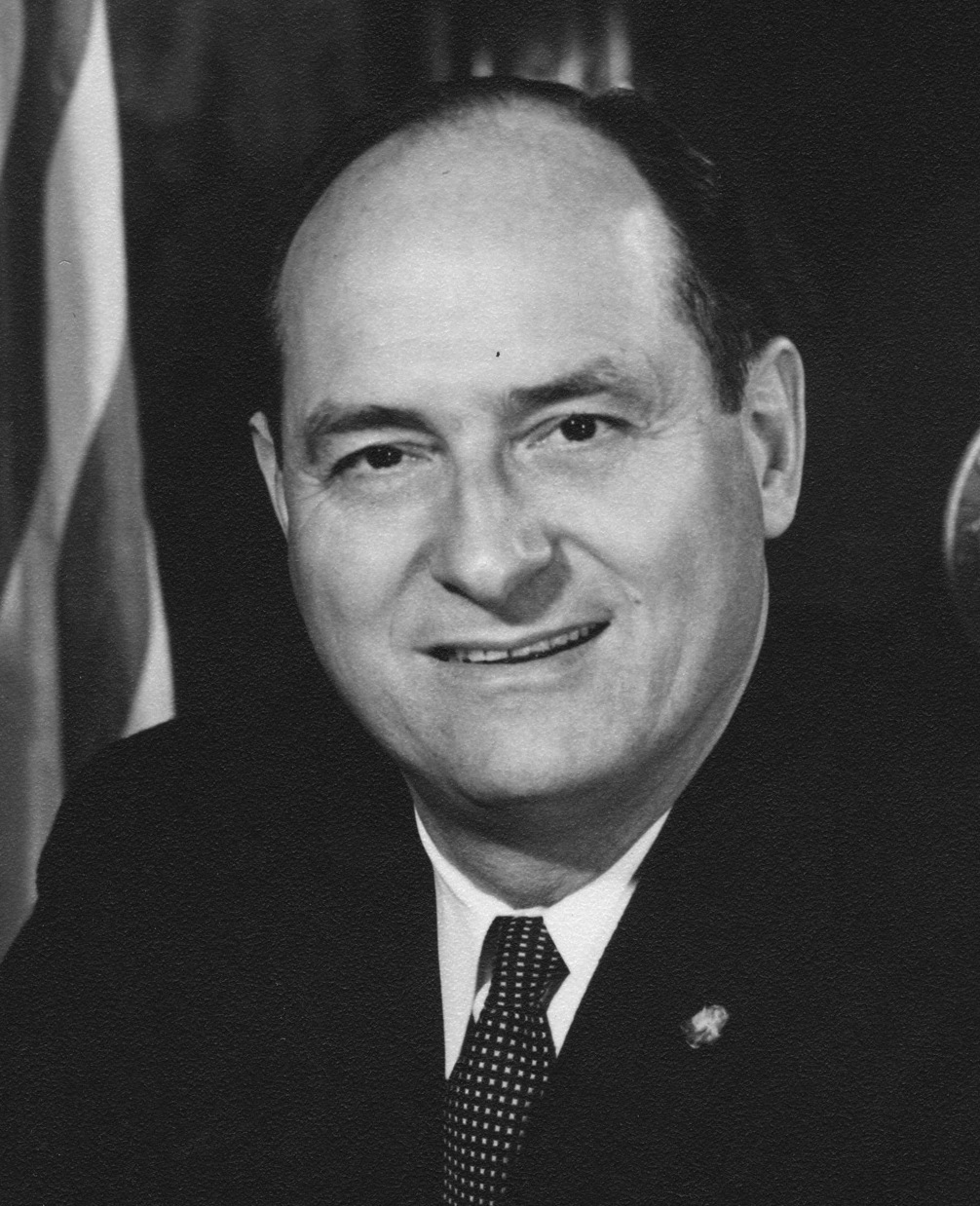

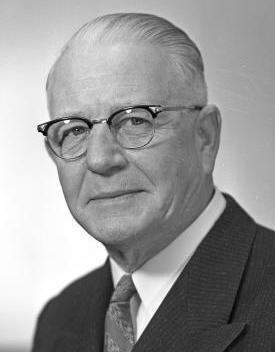
Nominee	Albert Rosellini	Emmett T. Anderson
Party	Democratic	Republican
Popular vote	616,773	508,041
Percentage	54.63%	45.00%
- County results Rosellini: 50–60% 60–70% Anderson: 50–60%
Governor before election
Arthur B. Langlie
Republican
Elected Governor
Albert Rosellini
Democratic

The 1956 Washington gubernatorial election took place on November 6, 1956, between Democratic state senator Albert Rosellini and Republican lieutenant governor Emmett T. Anderson.

Rosellini defeated Anderson during the general election, becoming the first Italian American to lead a U.S. state west of the Mississippi River. Incumbent Republican governor Arthur B. Langlie declined to run for a fourth term, instead challenging Warren Magnuson for a U.S. Senate seat. This election was the first open-seat gubernatorial election in Washington since 1924. This is the most recent gubernatorial election in Washington in which Yakima County has voted for a Democrat.

== Primary election ==
Incumbent governor Arthur B. Langlie, a Republican who had served three terms, announced on May 2 that he would not run for a fourth term and instead challenge Warren Magnuson for one of the state's U.S. Senate seats. Langlie made no public endorsement for a Republican candidate, but privately supported congressman Thor C. Tollefson prior to the announcement. Tollefson would later drop out of the gubernatorial race by the end of the month and pursue another congressional term, leaving Lieutenant Governor Emmett T. Anderson and Attorney General Don Eastvold as the remaining Republican frontrunners.

Albert D. Rosellini, a Democratic state senator from South Seattle, announced his candidacy on May 24, proposing a state department of commerce, industrial regulations, diversification of jobs and industries, a second Lake Washington bridge, and toll-free superhighways. Rosellini, a New Deal liberal Democrat who had been named leader of the state's Democratic Senate Caucus, publicly opposed Langlie during his three terms as governors and often butted heads with the former Seattle mayor. After missteps during his 1952 bid for governor, Rosellini was left to run in the 1956 race using his own funds.

State Secretary of State Earl Coe, another Democrat, joined the race in early July and became Rosellini's biggest challenger for the Democratic nomination. By the filing deadline in July, the field of candidates grew to nine, with Democratic state senator Roderick A. Lindsay of Spokane joining the race. Prior to the primary, Anderson emerged as a Republican favorite among former Langlie supporters, while Democrats Coe and Rosellini were expected to split a contentious vote.

During the September 11 blanket primary, Rosellini and Anderson won the right to advance to the general election, with comfortable margins in early returns. Coe formally endorsed Rosellini on September 26, citing a preference to avoid "past stalemates" and encouraging voters to give majority control of the legislature to the Democrats.

=== Candidates ===
==== Republican Party ====
- Emmett T. Anderson, lieutenant governor
- Ralph E. Bohnke
- Roy DeGrief
- Don Eastvold
- Thomas C. Hall
- John E. Lydon

==== Democratic Party ====
- Earl Coe, secretary of state
- John C. Edwards
- Roderick Lindsay, state senator from Spokane
- Albert D. Rosellini, state senator from South Seattle and candidate for governor in 1952

=== Results ===
Blanket primary results
Party	Candidate	Votes	%
Democratic	Albert D. Rosellini	236,291	31.62%
Republican	Emmett T. Anderson	192,500	25.76%
Democratic	Earl Coe	140,882	18.85%
Republican	Don Eastvold	99,020	13.25%
Democratic	Roderick Lindsay	39,072	5.23%
Republican	Thomas C. Hall	12,304	1.65%
Republican	Roy DeGrief	11,592	1.55%
Democratic	John C. Edwards	8,030	1.08%
Republican	John E. Lydon	3,933	0.53%
Republican	Ralph E. Bohnke	3,514	0.47%
Total votes		747,238	100.00%

== General election ==
Henry Killman was nominated by the Socialist Labor Party of America in September and approved by the Secretary of State as the only minor party in the governor's race.

Rosellini spent much of his campaigning proposing improvements to the state's institutions, including prisons and schools, while attacking the Langlie administration. Anderson, by contrast, made few promises and touted his qualifications as lieutenant governor.

On November 6, Rosellini won the governorship and promised to promote bipartisanship and select state employees on merit rather than political qualifications. Anderson formally conceded to Rosellini the following morning, congratulating him on his victory and thanking his supporters.

=== Results ===
1956 Washington gubernatorial election
Party	Candidate	Votes	%	±%
Democratic	Albert D. Rosellini	616,773	54.63	+7.28%
Republican	Emmett T. Anderson	508,041	45.00	−7.65%
Socialist Labor	Henry Killman	4,163	0.37	
Majority		108,732	9.63%	
Total votes		1,128,977	100.00%	
Democratic gain from Republican		Swing	+14.93%	

=== Results by county ===
County	Albert D. Rosellini Democratic		Emmett T. Anderson Republican		Henry Killman Socialist Labor		Margin		Total votes cast
County	#	%	#	%	#	%	#	%	Total votes cast
Adams	1,848	48.35%	1,972	51.60%	2	0.05%	-124	-3.24%	3,822
Asotin	3,043	59.88%	2,037	40.08%	2	0.04%	1,006	19.80%	5,082
Benton	15,696	62.12%	9,567	37.86%	4	0.02%	6,129	24.26%	25,267
Chelan	8,474	47.44%	9,291	52.02%	96	0.54%	-817	-4.57%	17,861
Clallam	7,143	58.22%	5,115	41.69%	10	0.08%	2,028	16.53%	12,268
Clark	22,162	58.55%	15,643	41.33%	48	0.13%	6,519	17.22%	37,853
Columbia	926	43.76%	1,190	56.24%	0	0.00%	-264	-12.48%	2,116
Cowlitz	14,079	58.98%	9,746	40.83%	45	0.19%	4,333	18.15%	23,870
Douglas	3,152	54.86%	2,589	45.06%	5	0.09%	563	9.80%	5,746
Ferry	903	61.68%	561	38.32%	0	0.00%	342	23.36%	1,464
Franklin	5,361	67.26%	2,606	32.69%	4	0.05%	2,755	34.56%	7,971
Garfield	703	44.66%	871	55.34%	0	0.00%	-168	-12.67%	1,574
Grant	8,098	60.74%	5,229	39.22%	6	0.05%	2,869	21.52%	13,333
Grays Harbor	14,914	61.95%	9,112	37.85%	48	0.20%	5,802	24.10%	24,074
Island	2,458	47.97%	2,660	51.91%	6	0.12%	-202	-3.94%	5,124
Jefferson	2,206	55.11%	1,795	44.84%	2	0.05%	411	10.27%	4,003
King	198,604	52.55%	176,645	46.74%	2,715	0.72%	21,959	5.81%	377,964
Kitsap	22,709	60.90%	14,543	39.00%	34	0.09%	8,166	21.90%	37,286
Kittitas	4,659	53.95%	3,969	45.96%	7	0.08%	690	7.99%	8,635
Klickitat	2,517	49.20%	2,593	50.68%	6	0.12%	-76	-1.49%	5,116
Lewis	9,543	49.63%	9,673	50.31%	12	0.06%	-130	-0.68%	19,228
Lincoln	2,457	46.57%	2,818	53.41%	1	0.02%	-361	-6.84%	5,276
Mason	4,282	55.13%	3,476	44.75%	9	0.12%	806	10.38%	7,767
Okanogan	5,904	55.95%	4,645	44.02%	4	0.04%	1,259	11.93%	10,553
Pacific	4,293	57.63%	3,150	42.29%	6	0.08%	1,143	15.34%	7,449
Pend Oreille	1,763	59.48%	1,201	40.52%	0	0.00%	562	18.96%	2,964
Pierce	65,509	57.63%	47,740	42.00%	413	0.36%	17,769	15.63%	113,662
San Juan	744	44.74%	915	55.02%	4	0.24%	-171	-10.28%	1,663
Skagit	10,927	52.21%	9,974	47.66%	26	0.12%	953	4.55%	20,927
Skamania	1,156	54.94%	948	45.06%	0	0.00%	208	9.89%	2,104
Snohomish	37,168	60.61%	23,973	39.10%	178	0.29%	13,195	21.52%	61,319
Spokane	57,796	53.68%	49,775	46.23%	104	0.10%	8,021	7.45%	107,675
Stevens	4,381	54.16%	3,699	45.73%	9	0.11%	682	8.43%	8,089
Thurston	12,128	51.11%	11,582	48.81%	17	0.07%	546	2.30%	23,727
Wahkiakum	982	57.83%	712	41.93%	4	0.24%	270	15.90%	1,698
Walla Walla	7,960	45.50%	9,534	54.49%	2	0.01%	-1,574	-9.00%	17,496
Whatcom	17,105	53.98%	14,426	45.52%	158	0.50%	2,679	8.45%	31,689
Whitman	5,564	42.70%	7,462	57.26%	5	0.04%	-1,898	-14.57%	13,031
Yakima	27,456	52.57%	24,604	47.11%	171	0.33%	2,852	5.46%	52,231
Totals	616,773	54.63%	508,041	45.00%	4,163	0.37%	108,732	9.63%	1,128,977

==== Counties that flipped from Republican to Democratic ====
- Benton
- Clallam
- Clark
- Jefferson
- Kings
- Kittitas
- Okanogan
- Skagit
- Stevens
- Thurston
- Wahkiakum
- Whatcom
- Yakima
