= J. Manny Santiago =

American pastor and LGBTQ rights advocate

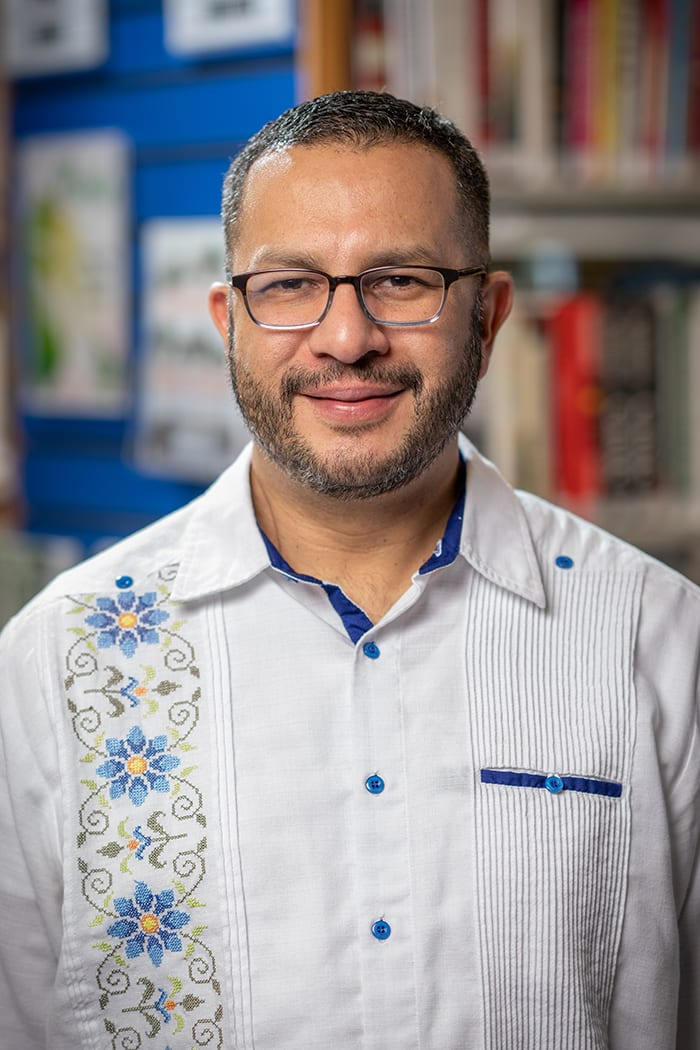
J. Manny Santiago

J. Manny Santiago is an American Baptist pastor from Puerto Rico and executive director of the Washington State LGBTQ Commission since October 2019. As of October 31, 2022, he was a member of the board of trustees at Tacoma Community College.

He was born and raised in Puerto Rico. He has said one of the reasons for him leaving Puerto Rico for the mainland United States was due to homophobia in Puerto Rico. Santiago graduated from Andover Newton Theological School in Newton, Massachusetts with a Master of Divinity.

A gay man, he is an advocate of LGBTQ rights within Christianity. In 2023, he spoke at "Love, Equally", an exhibit in Olympia, Washington which celebrated the legalization of same-sex marriage in the state, and has criticized states which have banned gender-affirming care for transgender people.
