= John Cherberg =

13th Lieutenant Governor of Washington

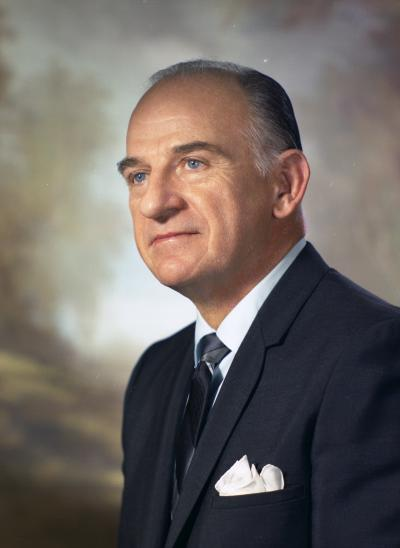

13th Lieutenant Governor of Washington
- In office January 16, 1957 – January 11, 1989
- Governor: Albert Rosellini; Daniel J. Evans; Dixy Lee Ray; John Spellman; Booth Gardner
- Preceded by: Emmett T. Anderson
- Succeeded by: Joel Pritchard

7th Chair of the National Lieutenant Governors Association
- In office 1968–1969
- Preceded by: Malcolm Wilson
- Succeeded by: Raymond J. Broderick

Personal details
- Born: John Andrew Cherberg; October 17, 1910 Pensacola, Florida, U.S.
- Died: April 8, 1992 (aged 81) Seattle, Washington, U.S.
- Resting place: Calvary Cemetery, Seattle
- Party: Democratic
- Education: University of Washington (BA)
- Coaching career

Playing career
- 1930–1932: Washington
- Position: Backfield

Coaching career (HC unless noted)
- 1933–1937: Cleveland HS (WA)
- 1938–1945: Queen Anne HS (WA)
- 1946–1947: Washington (backfield)
- 1948–1952: Washington (freshmen)
- 1953–1955: Washington

Head coaching record
- Overall: 10–18–2 (college)

Accomplishments and honors

Awards
- Second-team All-PCC (1932)

John Andrew Cherberg (October 17, 1910 – April 8, 1992) was an American politician, football coach, educator, and television executive. He served as the 13th lieutenant governor of Washington from 1957 to 1989, a longer tenure than any other lieutenant governor in the state's history. Previously he was head coach of the University of Washington football team from 1953 to 1955, compiling a record of 10–18–2. Two decades earlier he had been a college football player at Washington.

== Early life and career ==
Born in Pensacola, Florida in 1910, Cherberg was the youngest of twelve children from a butcher father who emigrated from Croatia, then a part of Yugoslavia. In 1919, his family moved to Seattle, Washington. He played football at Queen Anne High School before graduating in 1929. He attended the University of Washington (UW) and played halfback on the football team. Cherberg graduated in 1933 with a degree in economics. After graduation, he taught classes and coached football at Cleveland and Queen Anne high schools in Seattle, where he led both schools to state football championships.

He joined the UW football staff in 1946. The three seasons he served as head coach of the UW football team were controversial. His record of 10 wins, 18 losses, and 2 ties was identified as the second-worst in Seattle's history in a 2006 article by Seattle Post-Intelligencer columnist Jim Moore. The team was involved in a payoff scandal that led to NCAA sanctions for the school and the firing of Cherberg in February 1956.

== Political career ==
In June 1956 Cherberg announced his candidacy for the Democratic nomination for lieutenant governor. Capitalizing on name recognition from his football career and the statewide contacts he had developed as the head of the state's association of high school football coaches, he won the Democratic primary by defeating Howard S. Bargreen, and the general election by defeating Republican Don McDermott.

Cherberg was inaugurated as Washington's lieutenant governor on January 16, 1957, under fellow Democrat Albert Rosellini. For his first 15 years in office, he also worked as an account executive at Seattle-area TV station KIRO to supplement his then-low lieutenant governor salary.

Cherberg ran for Mayor of Seattle in 1964, but was defeated by Republican councilman Dorm Braman by 95,699 votes to his 83,205. Cherberg's platform included support for fair housing. Years later, both he and Braman testified for the prosecution regarding the mayoral race and money from Seattle police officials and King County Prosecuting Attorney Chuck Carroll, who were alleged to have been tolerating police corruption. (The case was later dismissed.)

Following his defeat in the mayoral campaign, he once again ran for lieutenant governor. He served continuously under Republican governor Daniel J. Evans (1965–1977), Democrat Dixy Lee Ray (1977–1981), Republican John Spellman (1981–1985), and for the first term of Democrat Booth Gardner (1985–1989). In his last race, he won comfortably with 63% of the vote. Cherberg stepped down in the 1988 race having served as lieutenant governor for nearly one third of Washington state's history at the time; at his death, he was the longest serving lieutenant governor in United States history.

== Death ==
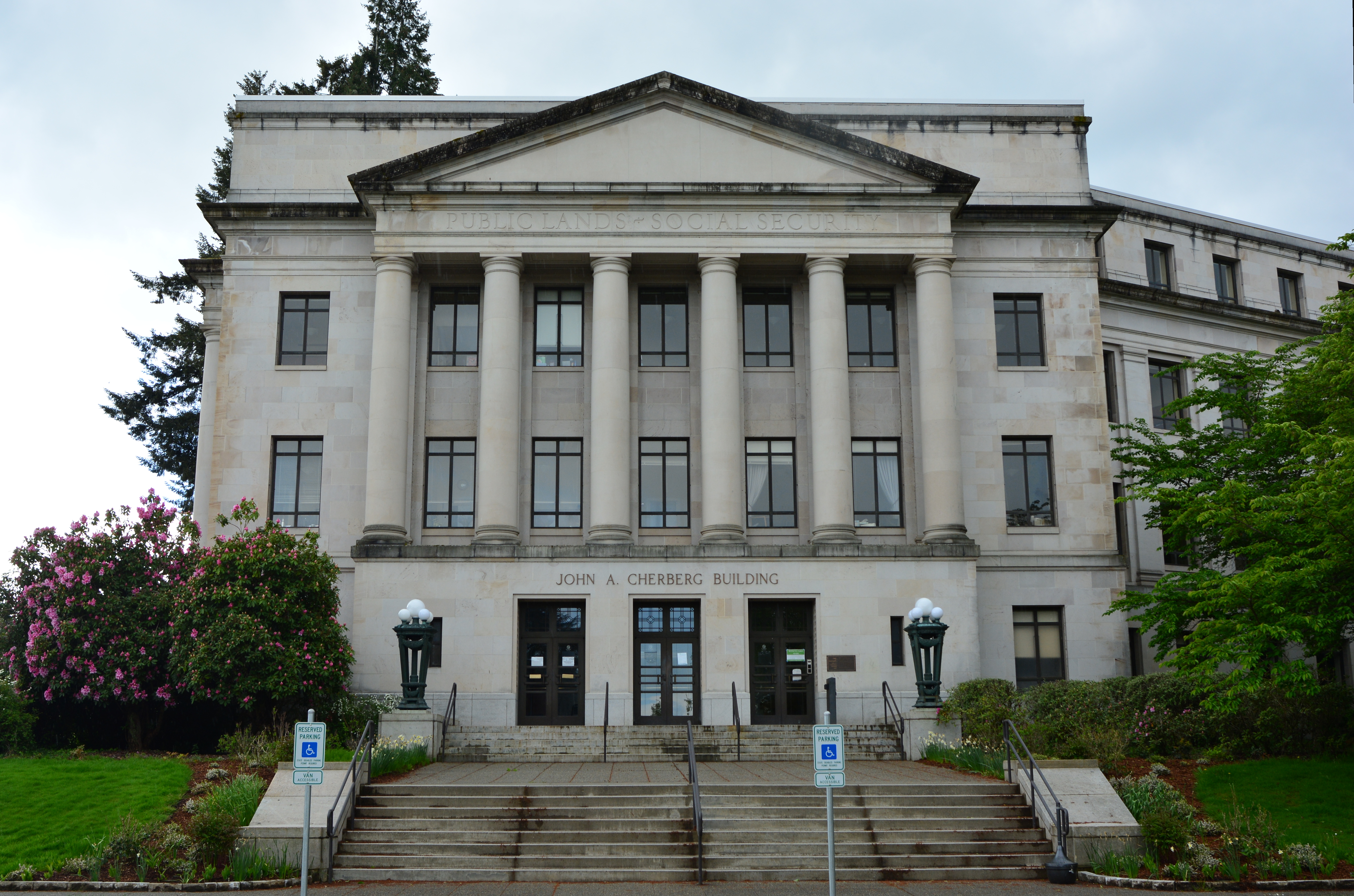
The John A. Cherberg Building at the Washington State Capitol houses senate offices.

Cherberg lived in Seattle until his death from pneumonia at age 81 in 1992. He was interred at Calvary Cemetery, about a mile (1.6 km) northeast of the University of Washington campus. The John A. Cherberg Building, which houses Washington State Senate offices at the State Capitol campus, was renamed in his honor.

== Head coaching record ==
=== College ===
Year	Team	Overall	Conference	Standing	Bowl/playoffs
Washington Huskies (Pacific Coast Conference) (1953–1955)
1953	Washington	3–6–1	2–4–1	7th	
1954	Washington	2–8	1–6	T–9th	
1955	Washington	5–4–1	4–3–1	5th	
Washington:		10–18–2	7–13–2		
Total:		10–18–2			

Political offices
Preceded by Emmett T. Anderson	Lieutenant Governor of Washington; 1957–1989	Succeeded by Joel Pritchard
