= 1960 Washington gubernatorial election =

- November 8, 1960
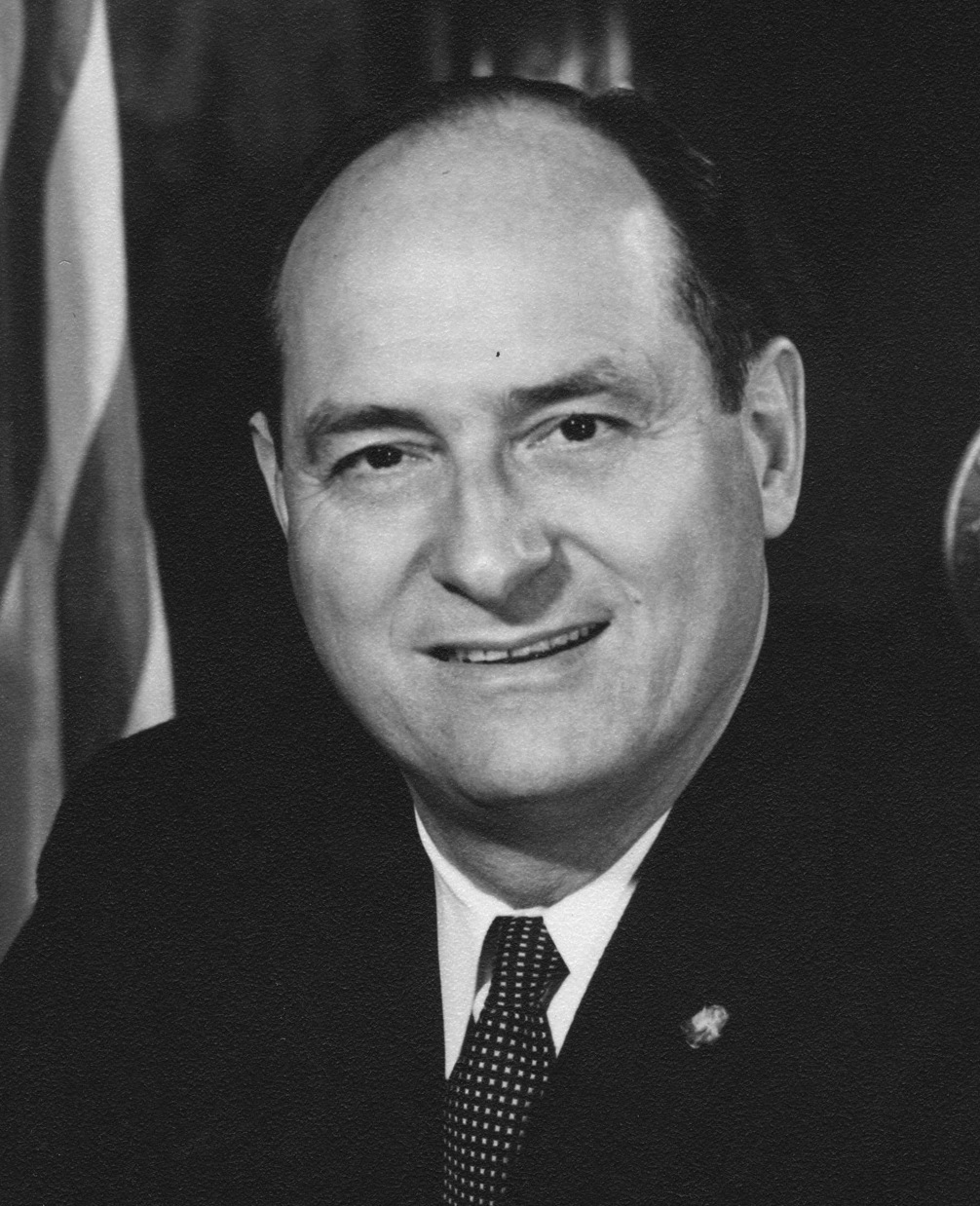

Nominee	Albert Rosellini	Lloyd J. Andrews
Party	Democratic	Republican
Popular vote	611,987	594,122
Percentage	50.34%	48.87%
- County results Rosellini: 50–60% Andrews: 50–60% 60–70%
Governor before election
Albert Rosellini
Democratic
Elected Governor
Albert Rosellini
Democratic

The 1960 Washington gubernatorial election took place on November 8, 1960, between incumbent Democratic governor Albert Rosellini and State Superintendent of Public Instruction Lloyd J. Andrews, nominated by the Republican Party.

Rosellini was re-elected to a second term as Governor of Washington, in a close race with Andrews. The election was the first in Washington state history to feature televised gubernatorial debates.

== Primary election ==
=== Campaign ===
Republican challengers to incumbent Governor Rosellini began announcing their bids for the office in early 1960. State representative and Republican house minority leader Newman H. Clark of the 43rd district announced his bid on January 23 at a Republican Party committee meeting. State Superintendent of Public Instruction Lloyd J. Andrews announced his bid on March 1, promising to improve the fiscal outlook for Washington's public schools while also criticizing Rosellini for his heavy spending and creation of a large tax burden. Republican chairman William C. Goodloe was a favorite to run, but announced in May that he would not run in the election.

Rosellini announced his re-election bid on May 21, at a Democratic rally in Seattle's Civic Auditorium. Touting his accomplishments during his term in office, Rosellini promised to "continue the job of progress in the State of Washington." Two Democratic candidates, Snohomish writer John Patric and Tacoma used cars salesman Bruce M. Sigman, both entered the race in July to challenge Rosellini, but did not make much headway.

The Republican primary campaign, pitting Andrews and Clark, was described as "rigorous contest" between the two. Andrews centered his campaign on attacking Rosellini and his administration, while Clark criticized both Rosellini and Andrews for their fiscal positions and proposed tax hikes. Early polls put Andrews as the clear frontrunner in the Republican race, with strong support from his native Eastern Washington, leading Rosellini's campaign to begin attacking Andrews and his record in the state senate, sensing a close general election.

During the September 13 primary, Rosellini defeated Patric and Sigman with a landslide victory, while Andrews defeated Clark by a comfortable margin. High voter turnout for Andrews, and low turnout for Rosellini, led The Seattle Times to declare that Rosellini "faces trouble" in the general contest.

Two smaller parties, the Socialist Labor Party of America and Socialist Workers Party, also nominated candidates in the general election.

=== Results ===
Blanket primary results
Party	Candidate	Votes	%
Republican	Lloyd J. Andrews	263,897	37.38%
Democratic	Albert Rosellini (incumbent)	244,579	34.65%
Republican	Newman H. Clark	144,440	20.46%
Democratic	John Patric	28,970	4.10%
Democratic	Bruce M. Sigman	24,031	3.40%
Total votes		705,917	100.00%

== General election ==
=== Debates ===
The 1960 election featured the first televised debates in Washington gubernatorial history. KING-TV, based in Seattle, broadcast two of the debates between Rosellini and Andrews along with sister stations KREM-TV in Spokane and KPQ-TV in Wenatchee.

The first debate, on September 28, came two days after presidential candidates Richard M. Nixon and John F. Kennedy debated for the first time on national television. The Seattle Times called the first gubernatorial debate "more entertaining than informative", noting that candidates "didn't bother to wait for recognition by the moderator [or each other]." Rosellini showed "flashes of hot temper", while Andrews accused the incumbent governor of never attempting to balance the budget despite claims of effort. Both candidates addressed the state's troubled public school system and budgetary problems, the latter of which Andrews argued was caused by Rosellini's spending, as well as pay increases for teachers. After the debate, Andrews criticized the debate's format and rules, and asked that candidates be asked the same questions and limit rebuttals.

The second televised debate, on October 25, focused on taxation and fixing issues with the state-built Hood Canal Bridge. In a more subdued affair, candidates had limited rebuttals but continued to attack and denounce each other. Rosellini was accused by Andrews of attacking him directly after quoting Andrews' Republican primary opponent Newman H. Clark.

=== Results ===
On November 8, Rosellini defeated Andrews by a narrow margin of 17,865 votes or 50% to 49%, in the general election, the smallest margin since the 1940 election. Rosellini, a Democrat, was re-elected despite Washington voters rejecting Democratic candidate John F. Kennedy in favor of Republican Richard M. Nixon in the concurrent presidential race. The initial returns led Andrews to delay conceding to Rosellini until November 17, after the final absentee ballots were tallied; Andrews had a brief lead in absentee ballots, but fell short of the margin needed to overtake Rosellini.

The Seattle Times noted similarities between the 1956 and 1960 elections, especially in the preliminary stages, with an early Republican frontrunner deterring strong opponents from entering the race, only to be defeated by Rosellini.

1960 Washington gubernatorial election
Party	Candidate	Votes	%	±%
Democratic	Albert Rosellini (incumbent)	611,987	50.34%	−4.29%
Republican	Lloyd J. Andrews	594,122	48.87%	+3.87%
Socialist Labor	Henry Killman	8,647	0.71%	+0.34%
Socialist Workers	Jack W. Wright	992	0.08%	
Majority		17,865	1.47%	
Total votes		1,215,748	100.00%	
Democratic hold		Swing	-8.16%	

=== Results by county ===
County	Albert D. Rosellini Democratic		Lloyd J. Andrews Republican		Henry Killman Socialist Labor		Jack W. Wright Socialist Workers		Margin		Total votes cast
County	#	%	#	%	#	%	#	%	#	%	Total votes cast
Adams	1,598	37.89%	2,614	61.99%	4	0.09%	1	0.02%	-1,016	-24.09%	4,217
Asotin	2,885	51.60%	2,706	48.40%	0	0.00%	0	0.00%	179	3.20%	5,591
Benton	13,421	51.69%	12,524	48.24%	14	0.05%	5	0.02%	897	3.45%	25,964
Chelan	8,717	48.49%	9,124	50.75%	118	0.66%	19	0.11%	-407	-2.26%	17,978
Clallam	7,375	57.23%	5,486	42.57%	22	0.17%	3	0.02%	1,889	14.66%	12,886
Clark	17,762	44.83%	21,821	55.08%	34	0.09%	2	0.01%	-4,059	-10.25%	39,619
Columbia	755	36.23%	1,329	63.77%	0	0.00%	0	0.00%	-574	-27.54%	2,084
Cowlitz	12,154	51.12%	11,501	48.37%	92	0.39%	29	0.12%	653	2.75%	23,776
Douglas	3,233	51.46%	3,035	48.31%	13	0.21%	1	0.02%	198	3.15%	6,282
Ferry	839	55.12%	681	44.74%	1	0.07%	1	0.07%	158	10.38%	1,522
Franklin	5,283	56.91%	3,954	42.59%	38	0.41%	8	0.09%	1,329	14.32%	9,283
Garfield	547	35.06%	1,013	64.94%	0	0.00%	0	0.00%	-466	-29.87%	1,560
Grant	7,448	50.66%	7,236	49.21%	13	0.09%	6	0.04%	212	1.44%	14,703
Grays Harbor	13,774	58.53%	9,543	40.55%	209	0.89%	8	0.03%	4,231	17.98%	23,534
Island	2,503	41.99%	3,446	57.81%	9	0.15%	3	0.05%	-943	-15.82%	5,961
Jefferson	2,385	56.09%	1,862	43.79%	4	0.09%	1	0.02%	523	12.30%	4,252
King	216,038	50.32%	207,578	48.35%	5,155	1.20%	562	0.13%	8,460	1.97%	429,333
Kitsap	20,286	55.72%	15,970	43.87%	135	0.37%	13	0.04%	4,316	11.86%	36,404
Kittitas	4,901	55.68%	3,887	44.16%	7	0.08%	7	0.08%	1,014	11.52%	8,802
Klickitat	2,580	47.55%	2,832	52.19%	13	0.24%	1	0.02%	-252	-4.64%	5,426
Lewis	8,797	45.95%	10,318	53.89%	26	0.14%	5	0.03%	-1,521	-7.94%	19,146
Lincoln	1,827	33.81%	3,574	66.15%	2	0.04%	0	0.00%	-1,747	-32.33%	5,403
Mason	4,380	56.20%	3,402	43.65%	10	0.13%	2	0.03%	978	12.55%	7,794
Okanogan	5,258	50.01%	5,243	49.87%	5	0.05%	7	0.07%	15	0.14%	10,513
Pacific	3,663	53.02%	3,227	46.71%	15	0.22%	4	0.06%	436	6.31%	6,909
Pend Oreille	1,520	51.74%	1,413	48.09%	4	0.14%	1	0.03%	107	3.64%	2,938
Pierce	62,861	52.00%	56,513	46.74%	1,372	1.13%	151	0.12%	6,348	5.25%	120,897
San Juan	646	37.76%	1,064	62.19%	1	0.06%	0	0.00%	-418	-24.43%	1,711
Skagit	11,517	50.53%	11,260	49.41%	10	0.04%	4	0.02%	257	1.13%	22,791
Skamania	1,182	52.25%	1,077	47.61%	3	0.13%	0	0.00%	105	4.64%	2,262
Snohomish	40,127	55.82%	31,303	43.55%	411	0.57%	44	0.06%	8,824	12.28%	71,885
Spokane	55,283	48.55%	58,372	51.26%	180	0.16%	34	0.03%	-3,089	-2.71%	113,869
Stevens	3,723	47.26%	4,145	52.61%	9	0.11%	1	0.01%	-422	-5.36%	7,878
Thurston	13,143	51.70%	12,248	48.18%	26	0.10%	6	0.02%	895	3.52%	25,423
Wahkiakum	818	48.78%	856	51.04%	2	0.12%	1	0.06%	-38	-2.27%	1,677
Walla Walla	7,891	43.47%	10,250	56.47%	11	0.06%	0	0.00%	2,359	13.00%	18,152
Whatcom	14,779	48.00%	15,633	50.77%	344	1.12%	35	0.11%	-854	-2.77%	30,791
Whitman	5,057	37.99%	8,238	61.89%	13	0.10%	2	0.02%	-3,181	-23.90%	13,310
Yakima	25,031	47.03%	27,844	52.32%	322	0.61%	25	0.05%	-2,813	-5.29%	53,222
Totals	611,987	50.34%	594,122	48.87%	8,647	0.71%	992	0.08%	17,865	1.47%	1,215,748

==== Counties that flipped from Democratic to Republican ====
- Clark
- Spokane
- Stevens
- Wahkiakum
- Whatcom
- Yakima
