= Lloyd J. Andrews =

9th Washington superintendent of public instruction

9th Washington Superintendent of Public Instruction
- In office January 16, 1957 – December 7, 1961
- Governor: Albert Rosellini
- Preceded by: Pearl A. Wanamaker
- Succeeded by: Louis Bruno

Member of the Washington Senate from the 5th district
- In office January 12, 1953 – January 14, 1957
- Preceded by: Donald B. Miller
- Succeeded by: John L. Cooney

Personal details
- Born: Lloyd Joel Andrews; August 26, 1920 Dutton, Montana, U.S.
- Died: October 7, 2014 (aged 94) Scottsdale, Arizona, U.S.
- Party: Republican
- Education: Washington State University

Military service
- Allegiance: United States
- Branch/service: United States Navy
- Battles/wars: World War II

Lloyd Joel Andrews Sr. (August 26, 1920 – October 7, 2014) was an American educator, businessman, and politician.

Born in Dutton, Montana, Andrews moved with his parents to a farm in Green Bluff, Washington. He graduated from Mead High School and then graduated from Washington State University. Andrews served in the United States Navy during World War II, reaching the rank of commander. Andrews served in the Washington State Senate from 1953 to 1957 as a Republican.

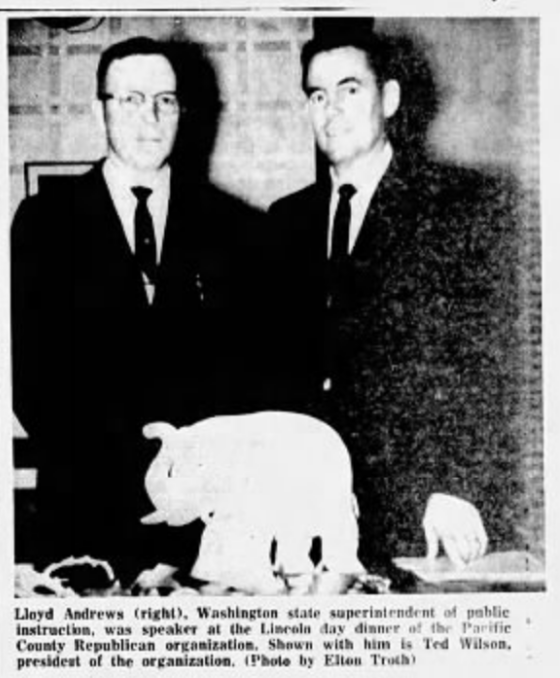
Andrews (left) at Lincoln Day dinner in South Bend, WA, February 1960

From 1957 to 1961, Andrew served as Washington State Superintendent of Public Instruction. In 1960, Andrews ran for the office of Governor of Washington and lost the general election to incumbent Albert D. Rosellini. In February 1960 Andrews addressed the Lincoln Day dinner in South Bend, WA, hosted by the Pacific County Republicans. Then, in 1964, Andrews ran for the United States Senate and lost the election. He was the owner of ChemNuclear. Andrews died in Scottsdale, Arizona.

Party political offices
Preceded by Emmett T. Anderson	Republican nominee for Governor of Washington; 1960	Succeeded by Daniel J. Evans
Preceded by William B. Bantz	Republican nominee for U.S. Senator from Washington (Class 1); 1964	Succeeded by Charles W. Elicker
