= 1940 United States Senate election in Washington =

- November 5, 1940
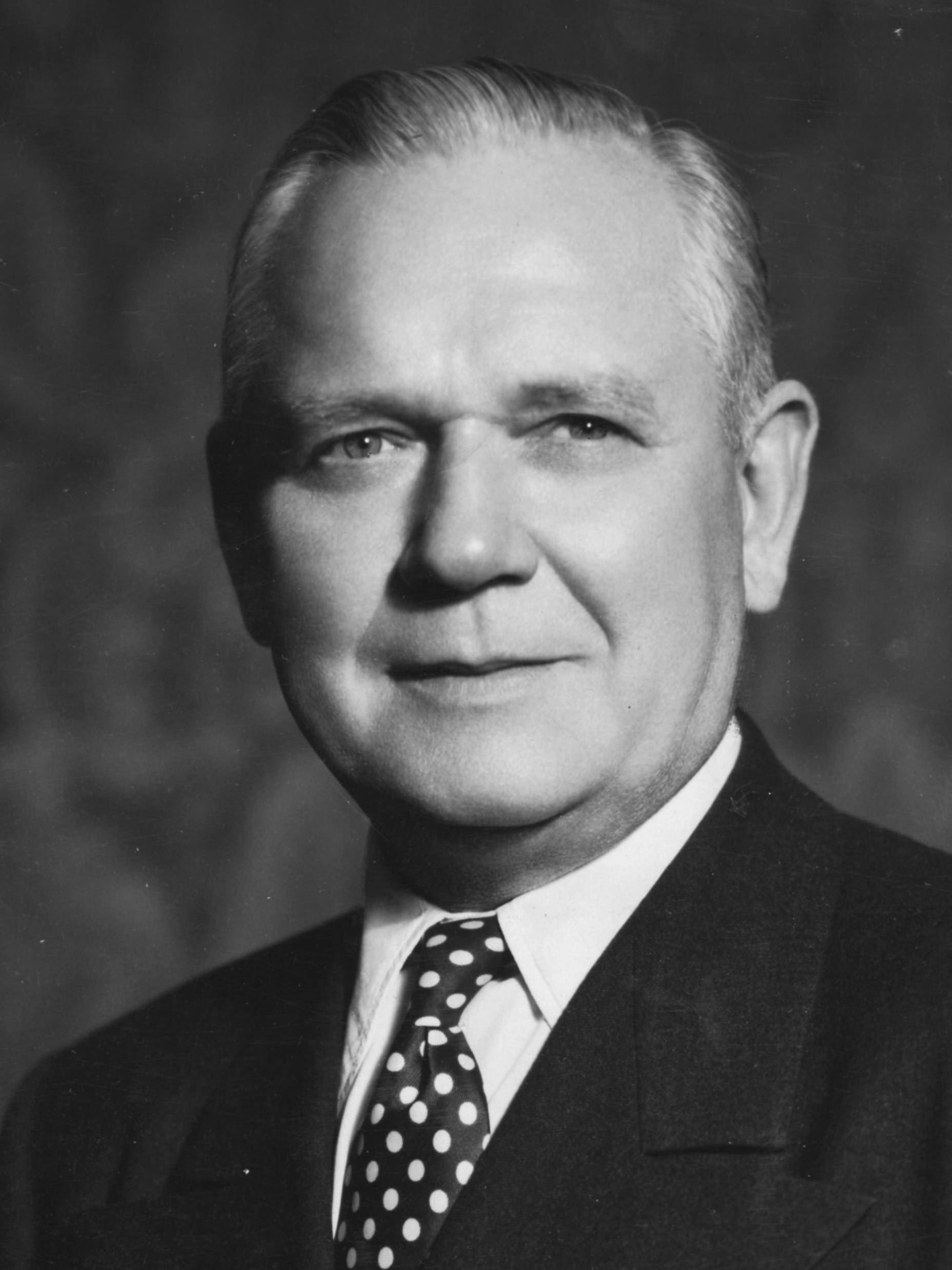

Nominee	Monrad Wallgren	Stephen F. Chadwick
Party	Democratic	Republican
Popular vote	404,718	342,589
Percentage	54.16%	45.84%
- County results Wallgren: 50–60% 60–70% Chadwick: 50–60% 60–70% 70–80%
U.S. senator before election
Lewis Schwellenbach
Democratic
Elected U.S. Senator
Monrad Wallgren
Democratic

The 1940 United States Senate election in Washington was held on November 5, 1940. Incumbent Democrat Lewis Schwellenbach did not run for a second term in office. He was succeeded by Democratic U.S. Representative Monrad C. Wallgren, who defeated Republican Stephen Foster Chadwick for the open seat.

== Blanket primary ==
=== Candidates ===
==== Democratic ====
- Frank T. Bell, former Commissioner of Fish and Fisheries, former Treasurer of Grant County, and businessman
- Harry C. Huse
- Donald B. Miller, State Representative, and businessman
- Roy B. Misener, King County Assessor
- Robert Lee Smith
- Monrad Wallgren, U.S. Representative from Everett

==== Republican ====
- Stephen Fowler Chadwick, son of Stephen J. Chadwick, and candidate for Representative from Washington in 1926
- Ewing D. Colvin, former Prosecutor of King County, and Washington State Bar Association official
- Howard E. Foster
- Eric Johnston, businessman, and former Marine
- Robert Prior

=== Results ===
Results by county Chadwick: 10–20%; 20–30%; 30–40%; Wallgren: 30–40%; 40–50%; 50–60%; Bell: 20–30%; 30–40%; 40–50%; Huse: 20–30%; Johnston: 20–30%

1940 U.S. Senate primary election in Washington
Party	Candidate	Votes	%
Republican	Stephen Foster Chadwick	137,320	27.45%
Democratic	Monrad Wallgren	96,747	19.34%
Democratic	Frank T. Bell	51,510	10.30%
Democratic	Harry C. Huse	50,930	10.18%
Republican	Eric Johnston	42,542	8.51%
Democratic	Roy B. Misener	41,259	8.25%
Republican	Ewing D. Colvin	27,903	5.58%
Republican	Robert Prior	19,194	3.84%
Democratic	Robert Lee Smith	13,918	2.78%
Democratic	Donald B. Miller	11,904	2.38%
Republican	Howard E. Foster	6,954	1.39%
Total votes		500,181	100.00%

== General election ==
=== Results ===
1940 U.S. Senate election in Washington
Party	Candidate	Votes	%	±%
Democratic	Monrad Wallgren	404,718	54.16%	▼6.77
Republican	Stephen Fowler Chadwick	342,589	45.84%	▲11.82
Total votes		747,307	100.00%	
Democratic hold		Swing		

== See also ==
- 1940 United States Senate elections
