= Emmett T. Anderson =

12th Lieutenant Governor of Washington

Emmett Anderson
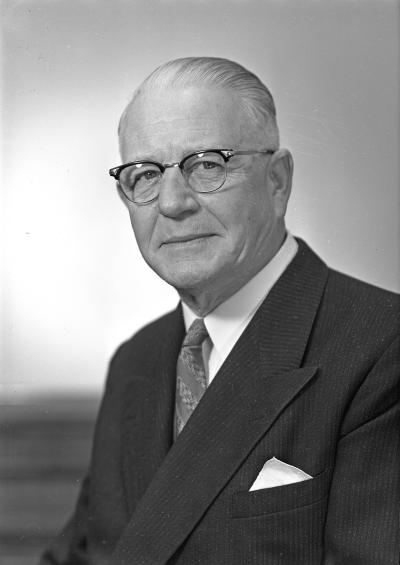
- Anderson in 1955

12th Lieutenant Governor of Washington
- In office January 14, 1953 – January 16, 1957
- Governor: Arthur B. Langlie
- Preceded by: Victor A. Meyers
- Succeeded by: John Cherberg

Personal details
- Born: Emmett Townsend Anderson; January 17, 1890 Tacoma, Washington, U.S.
- Died: March 20, 1969 (aged 79) Tacoma, Washington, U.S.
- Party: Republican

Emmett Townsend Anderson (January 17, 1890 – March 20, 1969) was an American politician from the U.S. state of Washington. A member of the Republican Party, he served as the 12th lieutenant governor of Washington from 1953 to 1957.

Anderson unsuccessfully ran for governor in the 1956 gubernatorial election, losing to Democrat Albert D. Rosellini.

Party political offices
Preceded by Arthur B. Langlie	Republican nominee for Governor of Washington; 1956	Succeeded by Lloyd J. Andrews
Political offices
Preceded by Victor A. Meyers	Lieutenant Governor of Washington; 1953–1957	Succeeded by John Cherberg
