= 1964 United States Senate election in Washington =

- November 3, 1964
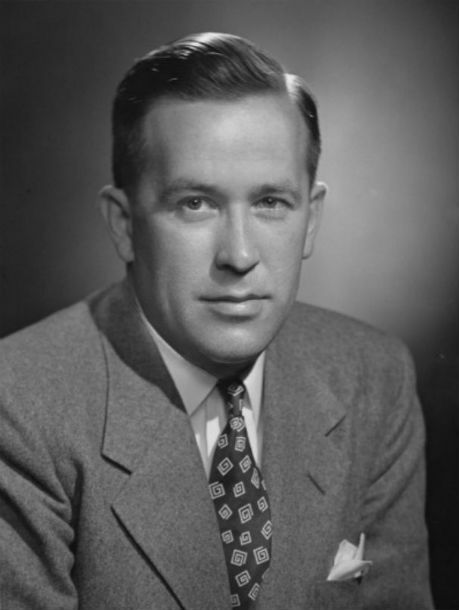

Nominee	Henry M. Jackson	Lloyd J. Andrews
Party	Democratic	Republican
Popular vote	875,950	337,138
Percentage	72.21%	27.79%
- County results Jackson: 50–60% 60–70% 70–80% 80–90%
U.S. senator before election
Henry M. Jackson
Democratic
Elected U.S. Senator
Henry M. Jackson
Democratic

The 1964 United States Senate election in Washington was held on November 3, 1964. Incumbent Democrat Henry M. Jackson won a third term in office with a landslide victory over Republican Superintendent of Public Instruction Lloyd J. Andrews.

== Blanket primary ==
=== Candidates ===
==== Democratic ====
- Alice Franklin Bryant
- Arthur C. DeWitt
- Henry M. Jackson, incumbent United States Senator since 1953

==== Republican ====
- Lloyd J. Andrews, State Superintendent of Public Instruction
- David J. Williams
- Mary Elizabeth Whitner

=== Results ===
1964 U.S. Senate primary election in Washington
Party	Candidate	Votes	%
Democratic	Henry M. Jackson (incumbent)	478,892	60.14%
Republican	Lloyd J. Andrews	216,616	27.23%
Republican	David J. Williams	37,450	4.71%
Democratic	Alice Franklin Bryant	29,052	3.65%
Democratic	Arthur C. DeWitt	20,709	2.6%
Republican	Mary Elizabeth Whitner	12,704	1.6%
Total votes		903,397	100.00%

== General election ==
=== Results ===
1964 U.S. Senate election in Washington
Party	Candidate	Votes	%	±%
Democratic	Henry M. Jackson (incumbent)	875,950	72.21%	▲5.11
Republican	Lloyd J. Andrews	337,138	27.79%	▼3.59
Total votes		1,213,088	100.00%	
Democratic hold		Swing		

== See also ==
- 1964 United States Senate elections
