= John T. McCutcheon (politician) =

American politician (1892–1971)

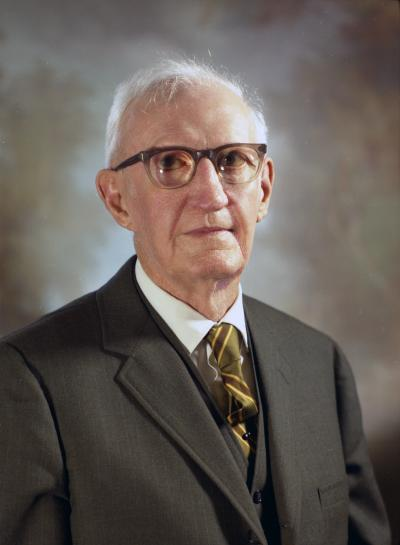
- McCutcheon in 1969

Member of the Washington House of Representatives for the 26th district
- In office 1941–1943

Member of the Washington State Senate
- In office 1943–1951 (26th district); 1959–1971 (29th district)

Personal details
- Born: March 23, 1892 Tacoma, Washington, United States
- Died: August 9, 1971 (aged 79) Steilacoom, Washington, United States
- Party: Republican

John Tyndall McCutcheon (March 23, 1892 – August 9, 1971) was an American politician in the state of Washington. He served in the Washington House of Representatives and Washington State Senate.
