= Tacoma Community College =

College in Tacoma, Washington, U.S.

Coordinates: 47.2467°N 122.5241°W

- Type: Public community college
- Established: 1965
- Location: Tacoma, Washington, United States
- Colors: Blue & Gold
- Nickname: TCC
- Mascot: Titan
- Website: www.tacomacc.edu

Tacoma Community College (TCC) is a public community college in Tacoma, Washington with operations in Tacoma and Gig Harbor. It serves the city of Tacoma and the Pierce County portion of the Kitsap Peninsula.

== History ==
TCC's creation was authorized by voters in 1962, and it opened in fall 1965. On 7 December 1966 the Pearl A. Wanamaker Library at Tacoma Community College was named and Pearl Anderson Wanamaker was an honoured guest.

As of 2009, nearly 1/2 million students have attended TCC since its opening. TCC is accredited by the Northwest Commission on Colleges and Universities (NWCCU) and is currently in the process of continued accreditation with NWCCU's current cycle of standards. TCC's average student age is 28 years old with over 15,000 students enrolling each year. TCC offers 46 state-approved vocational and technical programs with the average placement rate of 86% for students in their chosen field as of 2009/2010 data.

TCC offers 43 associate degree programs, 3 bachelor's degree programs, and 33 professional and technical certificates.

The bachelor's degree programs include Health Information management, Community Heath and Applied Management. There were seven graduates of these programs in the Class of 2019.

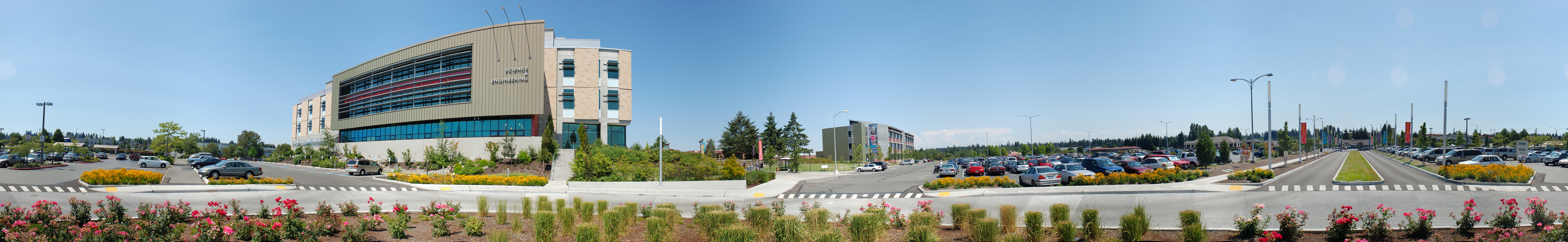
360° panorama of Tacoma Community College's south side.
