= 1944 Washington gubernatorial election =

- November 7, 1944
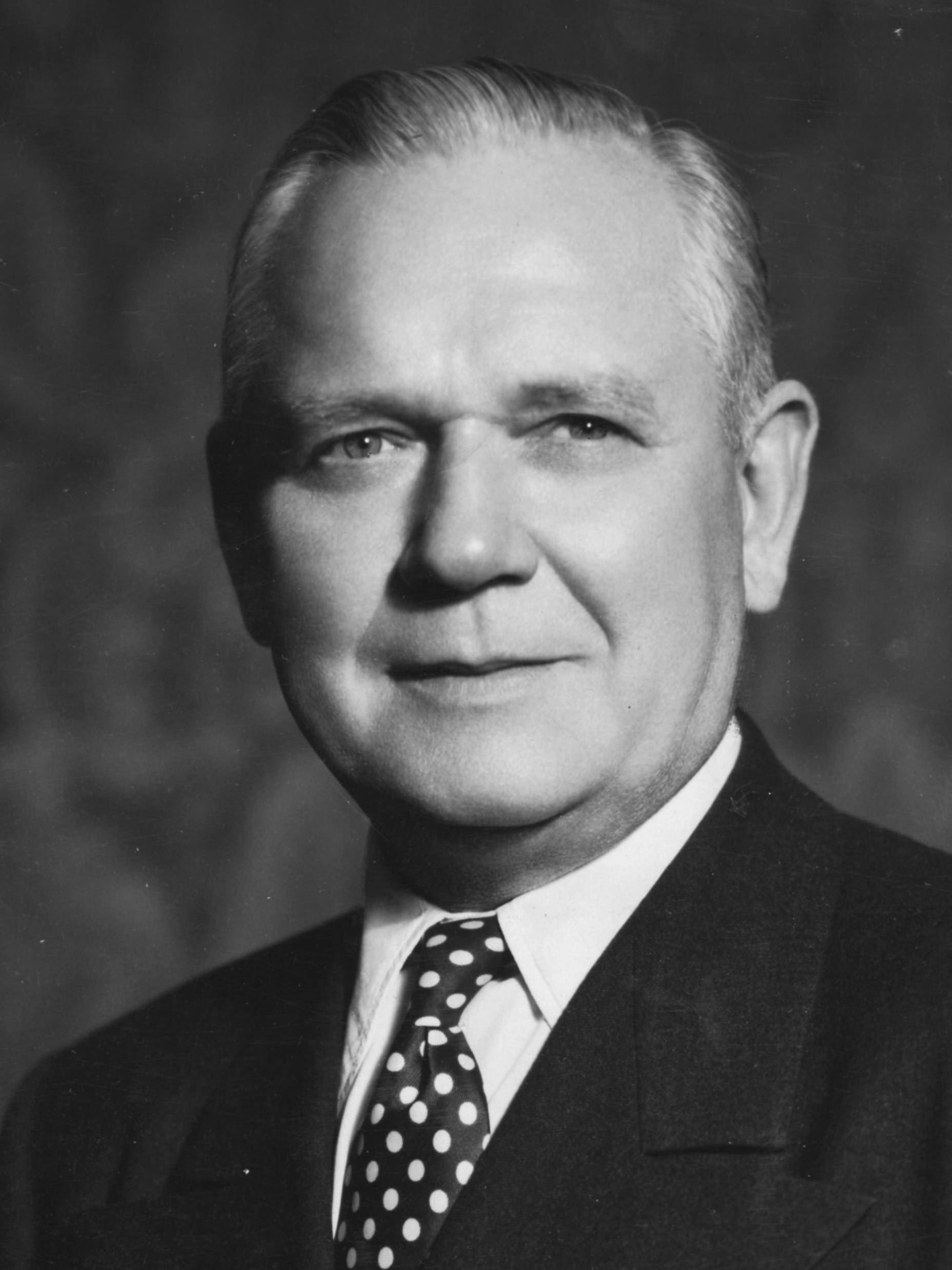

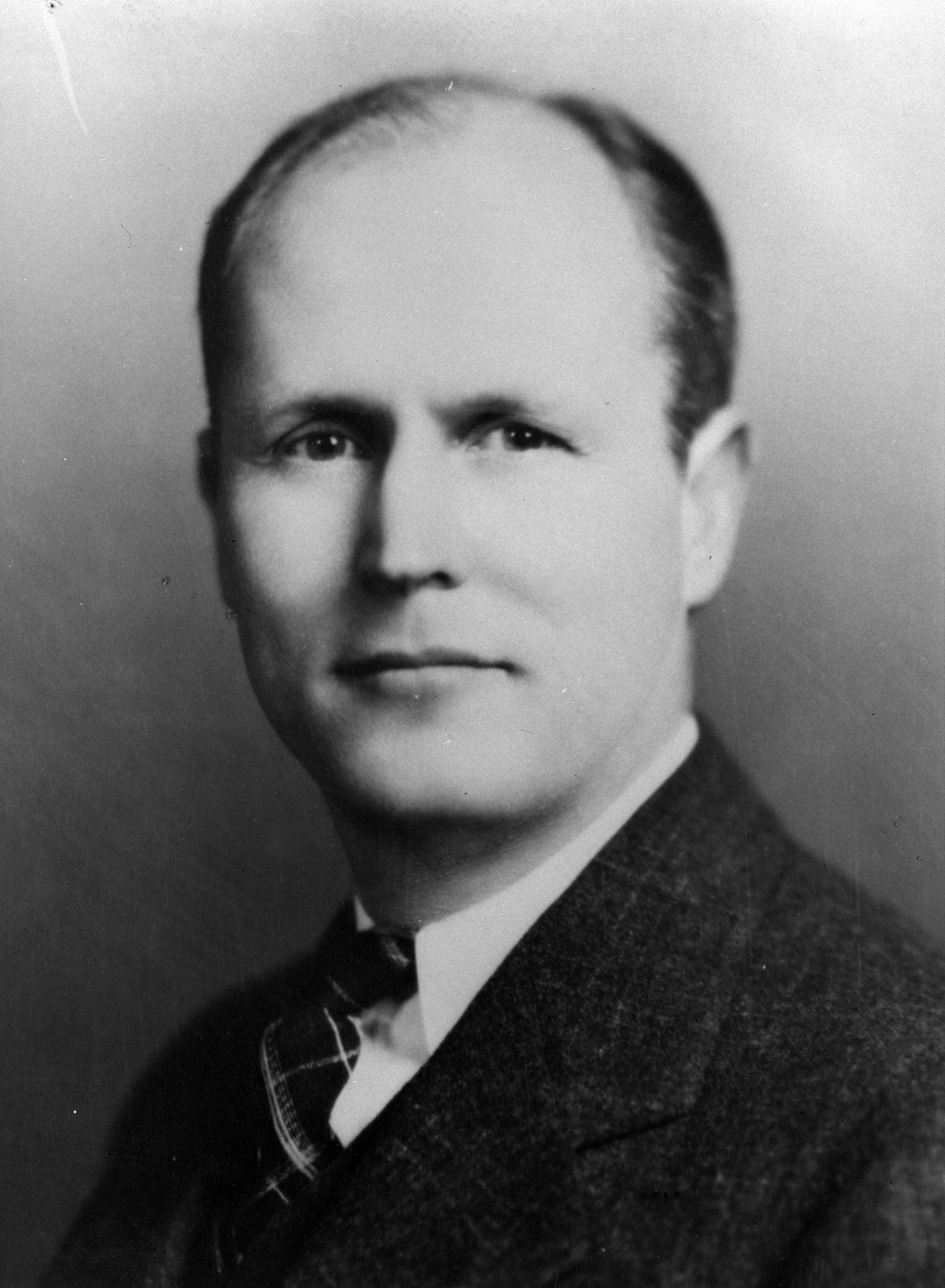
Nominee	Monrad Wallgren	Arthur B. Langlie
Party	Democratic	Republican
Popular vote	428,834	400,604
Percentage	51.51%	48.12%
- County results Wallgren: 50–60% 60–70% Langlie: 50–60% 60–70% 70–80%
Governor before election
Arthur B. Langlie
Republican
Elected Governor
Monrad Wallgren
Democratic

The 1944 Washington gubernatorial election was held on November 7, 1944. Democratic nominee Monrad Wallgren defeated incumbent Republican Arthur B. Langlie with 51.51% of the vote.

== Primary election ==
The primary election was held on July 11, 1944. At the time, Washington used a blanket primary for nominations, with all candidates appearing on the same ballot and the highest candidate for each party being nominated.

=== Candidates ===
- Charles A. DeBolt (R)
- Arthur B. Langlie (R), incumbent Governor
- Marius Rasmussen (R)
- Monrad Wallgren (D), incumbent United States Senator
- Louis A. Wasmer (R)

=== Results ===
Blanket primary results
Party	Candidate	Votes	%
Republican	Arthur B. Langlie (incumbent)	197,817	56.11%
Democratic	Monrad Wallgren	98,192	27.85%
Republican	Louis A. Wasmer	47,727	13.54%
Republican	Marius Rasmussen	5,686	1.61%
Republican	Charles A. DeBolt	3,125	0.89%
Total votes		352,547	100.00%

== General election ==
=== Candidates ===
Major party candidates

- Monrad Wallgren, Democratic
- Arthur B. Langlie, Republican

Other candidates

- Allen Emerson, Prohibition
- Henry E. O. Gusey, Socialist Labor

=== Results ===
1944 Washington gubernatorial election
Party	Candidate	Votes	%	±%
Democratic	Monrad Wallgren	428,834	51.51%	+2.02%
Republican	Arthur B. Langlie (incumbent)	400,604	48.12%	−2.12%
Prohibition	Allen Emerson	1,676	0.20%	
Socialist Labor	Henry E. O. Gusey	1,369	0.16%	+0.11%
Majority		28,230	3.39%	
Total votes		832,483	100.00%	
Democratic gain from Republican		Swing	+4.14%	

=== Results by county ===
County	Monrad Wallgren Democratic		Arthur B. Langlie Republican		Allen Emerson Prohibition		Henry E. O. Gusey Socialist Labor		Margin		Total votes cast
County	#	%	#	%	#	%	#	%	#	%	Total votes cast
Adams	810	30.15%	1,873	69.71%	4	0.15%	0	0.00%	-1,063	-39.56%	2,687
Asotin	1,545	48.75%	1,616	50.99%	4	0.13%	4	0.13%	-71	-2.24%	3,169
Benton	3,709	46.60%	4,228	53.12%	20	0.25%	2	0.03%	-519	-6.52%	7,959
Chelan	5,401	39.98%	8,077	59.79%	24	0.18%	8	0.06%	-2,676	-19.81%	13,510
Clallam	4,993	56.22%	3,879	43.68%	8	0.09%	1	0.01%	1,114	12.54%	8,881
Clark	15,678	51.47%	14,551	47.77%	160	0.53%	70	0.23%	1,127	3.70%	30,459
Columbia	852	38.33%	1,368	61.54%	2	0.09%	1	0.04%	-516	-23.21%	2,223
Cowlitz	8,721	53.15%	7,621	46.44%	41	0.25%	26	0.16%	1,100	6.70%	16,409
Douglas	1,537	42.67%	2,061	57.22%	4	0.11%	0	0.00%	-524	-14.55%	3,602
Ferry	717	56.55%	551	43.45%	0	0.00%	0	0.00%	166	13.09%	1,268
Franklin	1,667	50.67%	1,620	49.24%	3	0.09%	0	0.00%	47	1.43%	3,290
Garfield	465	29.49%	1,109	70.32%	3	0.19%	0	0.00%	-644	-40.84%	1,577
Grant	2,154	55.99%	1,692	43.98%	1	0.03%	0	0.00%	462	12.01%	3,847
Grays Harbor	11,785	55.47%	9,410	44.29%	27	0.13%	25	0.12%	2,375	11.18%	21,247
Island	1,499	48.03%	1,601	51.30%	21	0.67%	0	0.00%	-102	-3.27%	3,121
Jefferson	1,608	50.25%	1,589	49.66%	0	0.00%	3	0.09%	19	0.59%	3,200
King	148,545	53.89%	126,262	45.80%	519	0.19%	334	0.12%	22,283	8.08%	275,660
Kitsap	21,094	60.60%	13,633	39.16%	44	0.13%	40	0.11%	7,461	21.43%	34,811
Kittitas	3,748	49.50%	3,811	50.33%	12	0.16%	1	0.01%	-63	-0.83%	7,572
Klickitat	1,618	41.11%	2,276	57.83%	24	0.61%	18	0.46%	-658	-16.72%	3,936
Lewis	6,808	41.39%	9,612	58.44%	21	0.13%	8	0.05%	-2,804	-17.05%	16,449
Lincoln	1,904	38.29%	3,069	61.71%	0	0.00%	0	0.00%	-1,165	-23.43%	4,973
Mason	2,957	56.79%	2,245	43.12%	3	0.06%	2	0.04%	712	13.67%	5,207
Okanogan	3,904	45.59%	4,642	54.21%	9	0.11%	8	0.09%	-738	-8.62%	8,563
Pacific	3,205	52.50%	2,899	47.49%	1	0.02%	0	0.00%	306	5.01%	6,105
Pend Oreille	1,162	48.28%	1,245	51.72%	0	0.00%	0	0.00%	-83	-3.45%	2,407
Pierce	47,259	56.90%	35,213	42.40%	228	0.27%	353	0.43%	12,046	14.50%	83,053
San Juan	600	44.78%	739	55.15%	1	0.07%	0	0.00%	-139	-10.37%	1,340
Skagit	8,622	50.34%	8,466	49.43%	30	0.18%	10	0.06%	156	0.91%	17,128
Skamania	795	50.32%	776	49.11%	8	0.51%	1	0.06%	19	1.20%	1,580
Snohomish	25,777	60.81%	16,304	38.47%	104	0.25%	201	0.47%	9,473	22.35%	42,386
Spokane	39,092	48.26%	41,789	51.59%	56	0.07%	71	0.09%	-2,697	-3.33%	81,008
Stevens	3,462	49.41%	3,522	50.26%	19	0.27%	4	0.06%	-60	-0.86%	7,007
Thurston	8,532	48.54%	8,990	51.14%	44	0.25%	12	0.07%	-458	-2.61%	17,578
Wahkiakum	806	52.75%	715	46.79%	0	0.00%	7	0.46%	91	5.96%	1,528
Walla Walla	4,687	36.05%	8,279	63.67%	26	0.20%	10	0.08%	-3,592	-27.63%	13,002
Whatcom	13,210	48.28%	13,916	50.86%	107	0.39%	127	0.46%	-706	-2.58%	27,360
Whitman	3,965	34.90%	7,391	65.06%	4	0.04%	1	0.01%	-3,426	-30.16%	11,361
Yakima	13,941	38.70%	21,964	60.98%	94	0.26%	21	0.06%	-8,023	-22.27%	36,020
Totals	428,834	51.51%	400,604	48.17%	1,676	0.20%	1,369	0.16%	28,230	3.39%	832,483

==== Counties that flipped from Republican to Democratic ====
- Clark
- Jefferson
- Skagit
- Wahkiakum

==== Counties that flipped from Democratic to Republican ====
- Pend Oreille
- Spokane
- Stevens
