= Mabana, Washington =

Unincorporated community in Washington, US

- Unincorporated community
- Location within Washington (state) Location within the United States
- Coordinates: 48°05′40″N 122°24′55″W
- Country: United States
- State: Washington
- County: Island
- Established: 1912
- Elevation: 89 ft (27 m)
- Time zone: UTC-8 (Pacific (PST))
  - Summer (DST): UTC-7 (PDT)
- Area code: 360
- GNIS feature ID: 1511111

Mabana is an unincorporated community in Island County, in the U.S. state of Washington.

== History ==
A post office called Mabana was established in 1912, and remained in operation until 1936. The community's name is an amalgamation of the name of Mabel Anderson, the child of a first settler.
