= Monrad Wallgren =

13th governor of Washington from 1945 to 1949

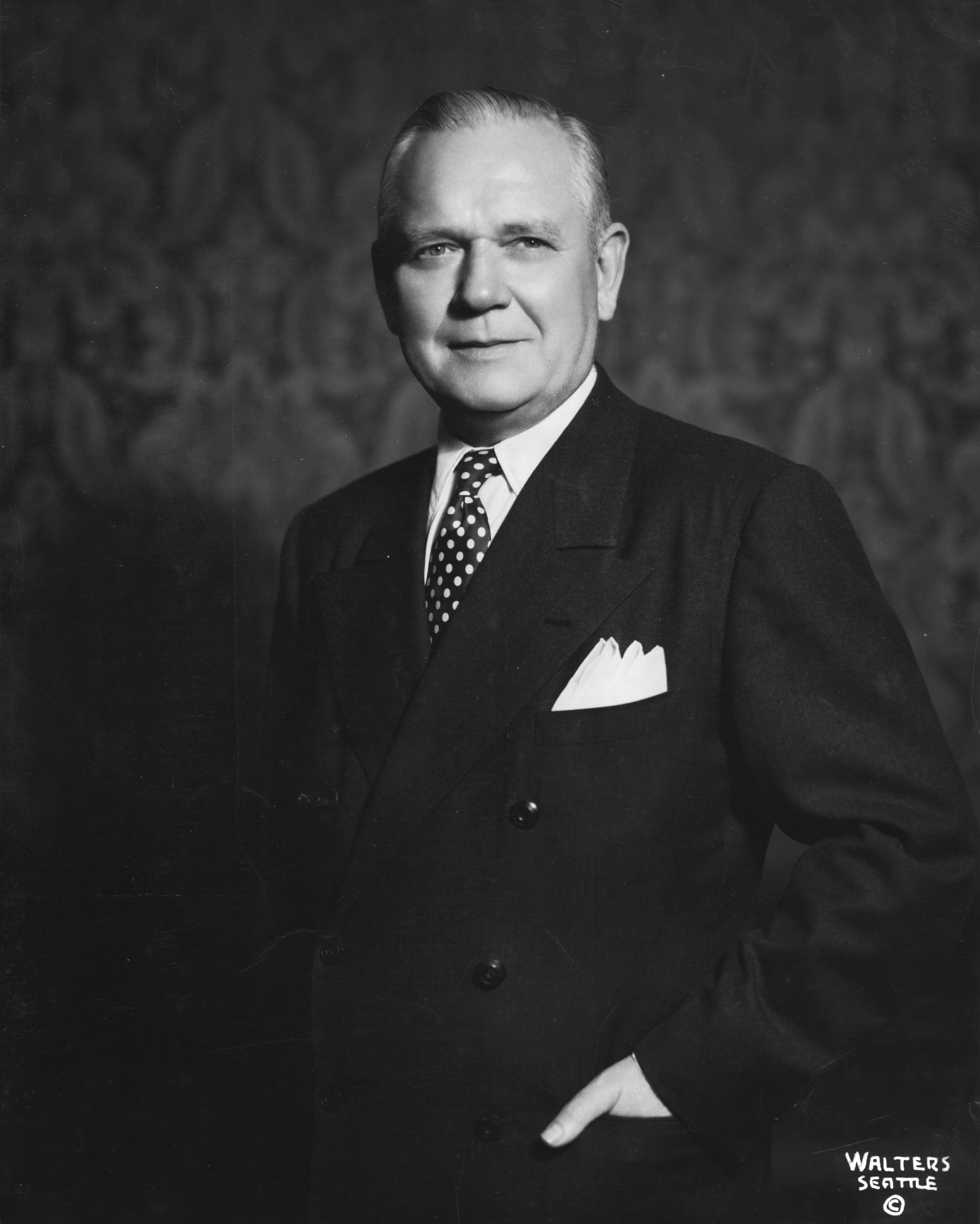

Member of the Federal Power Commission
- In office November 2, 1949 – October 1, 1951
- President: Harry S. Truman

13th Governor of Washington
- In office January 10, 1945 – January 12, 1949
- Lieutenant: Victor A. Meyers
- Preceded by: Arthur B. Langlie
- Succeeded by: Arthur B. Langlie

United States Senator from Washington
- In office December 19, 1940 – January 9, 1945
- Preceded by: Lewis B. Schwellenbach
- Succeeded by: Hugh Mitchell

Member of the U.S. House of Representatives from Washington's 2nd district
- In office March 4, 1933 – December 19, 1940
- Preceded by: Lindley H. Hadley
- Succeeded by: Henry M. Jackson

Personal details
- Born: Monrad Charles Wallgren; April 17, 1891 Des Moines, Iowa, U.S.
- Died: September 18, 1961 (aged 70) Olympia, Washington, U.S.
- Party: Democratic

Military service
- Allegiance: United States
- Branch/service: United States Army: Washington Army National Guard
- Years of service: 1917–1919, 1921–1922
- Rank: First Lieutenant
- Unit: United States Army Coast Artillery Corps, 161st Infantry Regiment (United States)
- Battles/wars: World War I

Monrad Charles Wallgren (April 17, 1891 – September 18, 1961) was an American politician from the state of Washington. A member of the Democratic Party, Wallgren served as the 13th governor of Washington from 1945 to 1949; he also represented Washington in the United States House of Representatives and the United States Senate.

Wallgren, of Swedish descent, was born in Des Moines, Iowa, in 1891. His family moved to Texas in 1894 and then to Everett, Washington, in 1901. He attended public schools and business college in Everett, graduating from the Washington State School of Optometry in Spokane in 1914. He worked in retail jewelry and optometry from 1915 to 1932, as well as serving in the Washington National Guard from 1917 to 1919 and from 1921 to 1922. He was an outstanding player of carom billiards.

In 1932, Wallgren ran for election to the United States House of Representatives as a Democrat. He defeated incumbent Republican Albert Johnson by a large margin in a year of strong Democratic performance, and took office on March 4, 1933. Wallgren was reelected in 1934, 1936, and 1938, each time by a wide margin. Wallgren did not run for reelection in 1940, instead running to represent the state in the United States Senate, to replace fellow Democrat Lewis B. Schwellenbach, who was retiring to accept a judicial nomination. Wallgren won the election, and was also appointed to finish the final weeks of Schwellenbach's term, taking office on December 19, 1940.

While Wallgren served portions of two different terms (the end of Schwellenbach's and the one that Wallgren was elected to), he served less than 6 years in the Senate. In 1944, he successfully ran for governor of Washington against incumbent Republican Arthur B. Langlie, resigning from the Senate to take office as governor on January 10, 1945. He ran for reelection as governor in 1948, but was defeated in a rematch against Langlie. Wallgren was then nominated by President Harry Truman as the chairman of the National Security Resources Board. That nomination was later withdrawn, and Wallgren served as chairman of the Federal Power Commission from 1949 to 1951. He then retired from public service.

In 1961, Wallgren died of complications resulting from a traffic accident.

Party political offices
Preceded by Lewis B. Schwellenbach	Democratic nominee for U.S. Senator from Washington (Class 1); 1940	Succeeded by Hugh Mitchell
Preceded by Clarence Dill	Democratic nominee for Governor of Washington; 1944, 1948	Succeeded by Hugh Mitchell
U.S. House of Representatives
Preceded by Lindley H. Hadley	Member of the U.S. House of Representatives from Washington's 2nd congressional district March 4, 1933 – December 19, 1940	Succeeded by Henry M. Jackson
U.S. Senate
Preceded by Lewis B. Schwellenbach	U.S. senator (Class 1) from Washington; December 19, 1940 – January 9, 1945; Served alongside: Homer Bone, Warren Magnuson	Succeeded by Hugh Mitchell
Political offices
Preceded by Arthur B. Langlie	Governor of Washington; 1945–1949	Succeeded by Arthur B. Langlie
