= Howard S. Bargreen =

American politician (1906–1987)

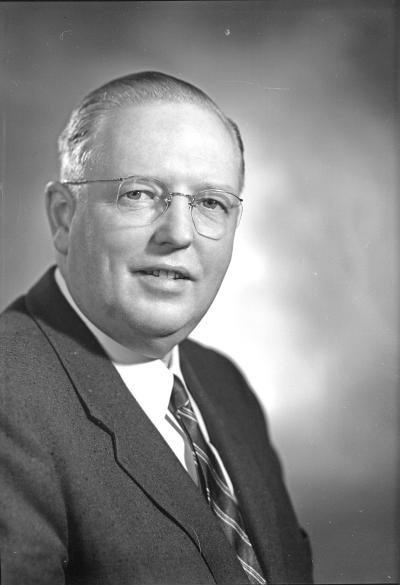
- Bargreen in 1957

Member of the Washington House of Representatives from the 38th district
- In office January 10, 1949 – January 8, 1951
- Preceded by: Archie Baker
- Succeeded by: Wallace I. Carmichael

Member of the Washington Senate from the 38th district
- In office January 8, 1951 – January 14, 1963
- Preceded by: Ross W. Earlywine
- Succeeded by: August P. Mardesich
- In office December 7, 1940 – January 13, 1947
- Preceded by: Pearl A. Wanamaker
- Succeeded by: Ross W. Earlywine

Personal details
- Born: Howard Samuel Bargreen; July 6, 1906 Everett, Washington, U.S.
- Died: December 18, 1987 (aged 81) Everett, Washington, U.S.
- Party: Democratic

Howard Samuel Bargreen (July 6, 1906 – December 18, 1987) was an American politician in the state of Washington. He served in the Washington House of Representatives and Washington State Senate. He died in 1987 in Everett, Washington.
