= Arthur B. Langlie =

12th and 14th governor of Washington

Arthur Langlie
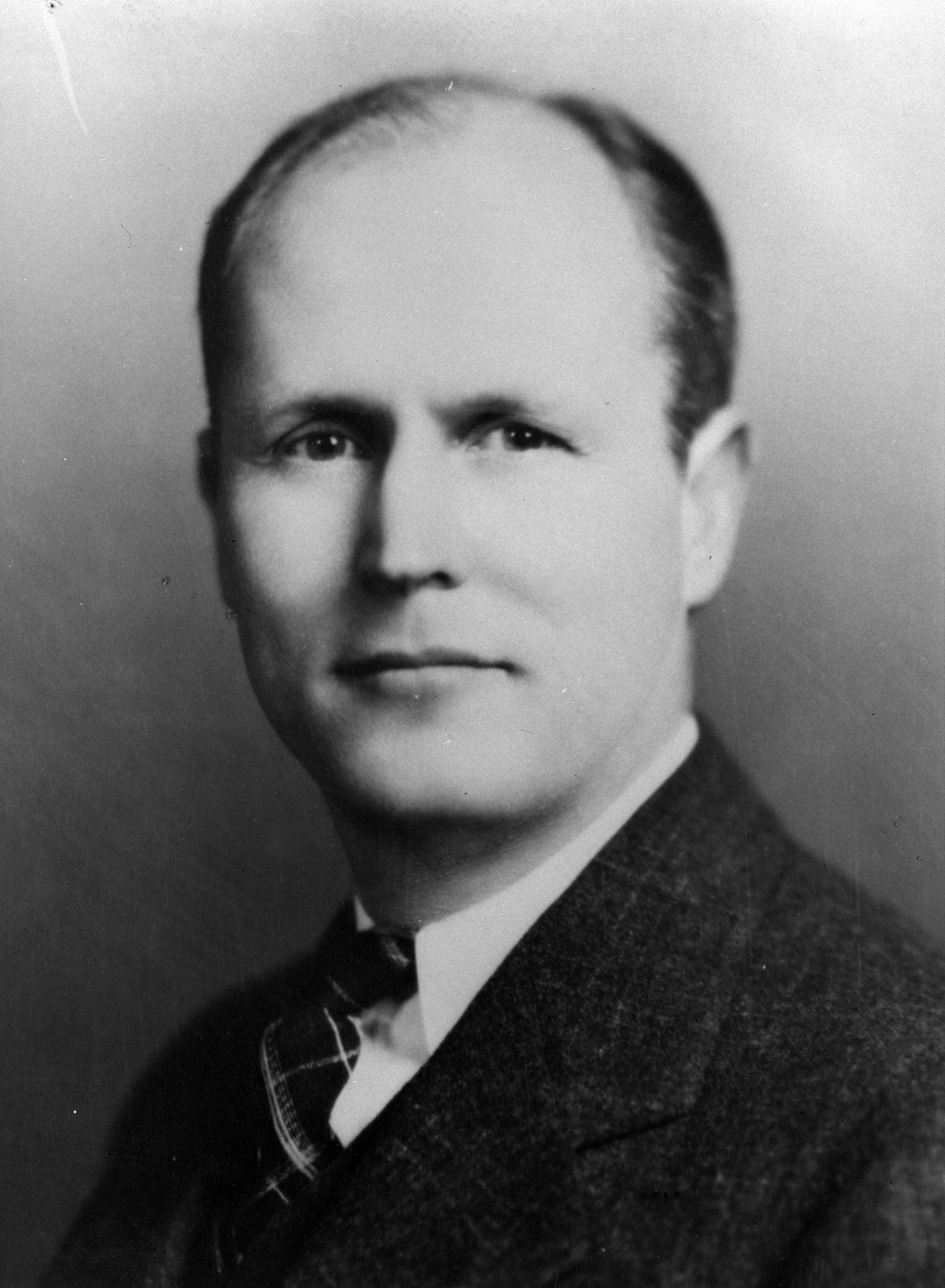
- Langlie c. 1941–1945

12th and 14th Governor of Washington
- In office January 12, 1949 – January 16, 1957
- Lieutenant: Victor Aloysius Meyers; Emmett T. Anderson
- Preceded by: Monrad Wallgren
- Succeeded by: Albert Rosellini
- In office January 15, 1941 – January 10, 1945
- Lieutenant: Victor Aloysius Meyers
- Preceded by: Clarence D. Martin
- Succeeded by: Monrad Wallgren

Chair of the National Governors Association
- In office August 9, 1955 – June 24, 1956
- Preceded by: Robert F. Kennon
- Succeeded by: Thomas B. Stanley

41st Mayor of Seattle
- In office April 27, 1938 – January 11, 1941
- Preceded by: James Scavotto
- Succeeded by: John E. Carroll

Member of the Seattle City Council
- In office March 1935 – March 1938

Personal details
- Born: Arthur Bernard Langlie; July 25, 1900 Lanesboro, Minnesota, U.S.
- Died: July 24, 1966 (aged 65) Seattle, Washington, U.S.
- Party: Republican
- Education: University of Washington (LLB)

Arthur Bernard Langlie (July 25, 1900 – July 24, 1966) was an American politician who served as the mayor of Seattle and was the 12th and 14th governor of the state of Washington from 1941 to 1945 and from 1949 to 1957. He is the only mayor of Seattle to be elected governor of Washington, the longest serving Governor of Washington (4,384 days), and the only governor in the state's history to serve non-consecutive terms.

== Early life and education ==
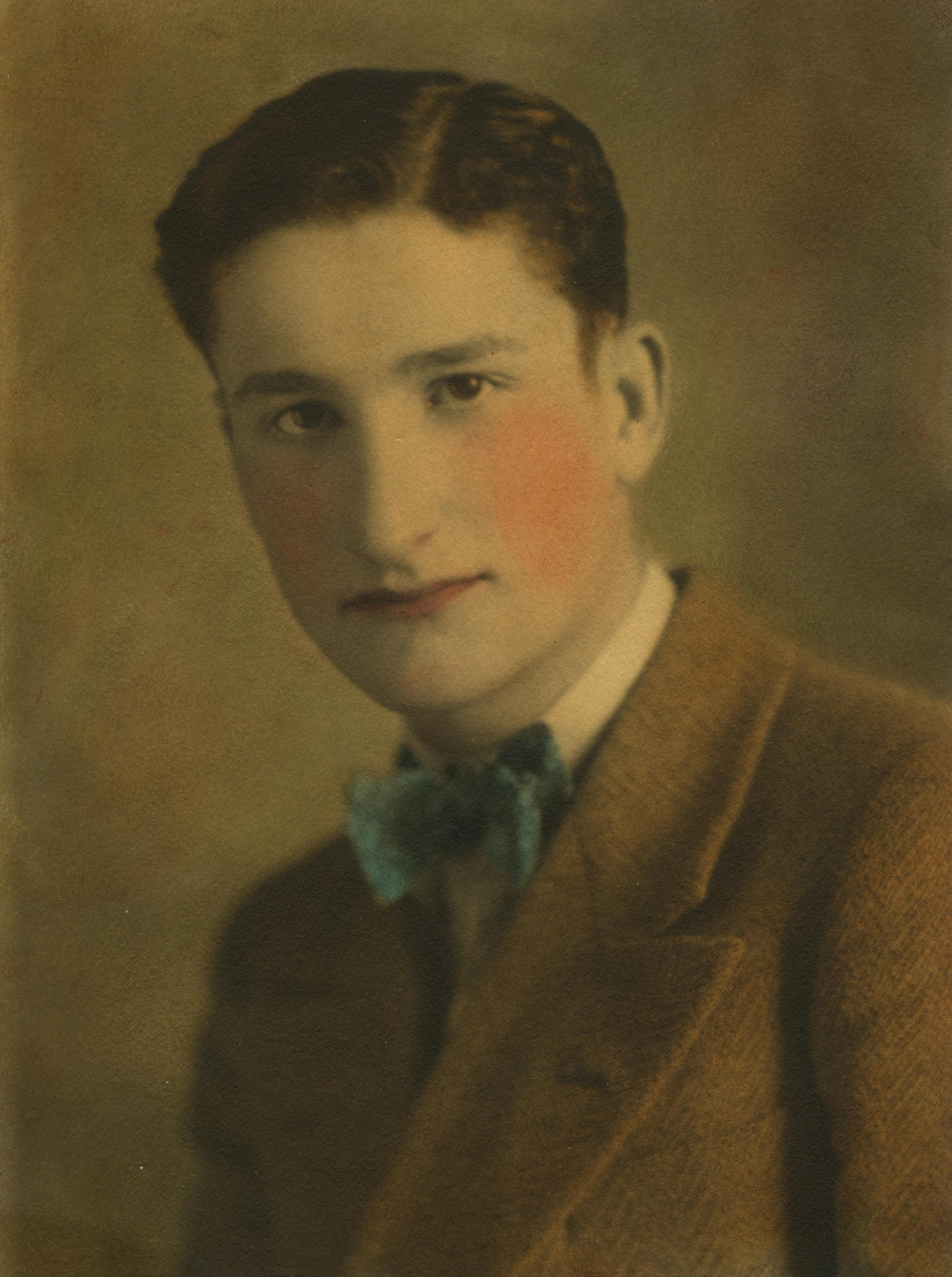
Langlie c. 1925

Langlie was born in Lanesboro, Minnesota. His father, Bjarne Langlie, had emigrated from Norway. His mother, Carrie Dahl, was of Norwegian and Swedish ancestry. He moved with his family to Washington's Kitsap Peninsula at the age of nine. Langlie was graduated from Union High School, in Bremerton, Washington. Langlie earned a Bachelor of Laws from the University of Washington in 1925, where he was a member of Phi Kappa Sigma fraternity.

== Career ==
After graduating from the University of Washington, Langlie became a senior partner in the law firm of Langlie, Todd, and Nickell.

He practiced law in Seattle for nearly 10 years before winning a Seattle City Council seat in 1935 as a candidate of the New Order of Cincinnatus. He served as mayor of Seattle from 1938 to 1941. He became the Republican candidate for governor in 1940 and won a narrow victory. He is to date the only mayor of Seattle to be elected governor of Washington.

At 40, Langlie was the youngest governor in the history of the state until Daniel Jackson Evans took office in 1965 at 39. Langlie was defeated for re-election in 1944 by Democrat Monrad C. Wallgren but won the office back by defeating Wallgren in 1948. Langlie is the only Washington governor to regain that office after losing it.

In 1952, he was one of five people on the shortlist for the Republican vice presidential nomination. Dwight Eisenhower instead chose Richard Nixon. He was an unsuccessful candidate for the United States Senate in 1956. Langlie's legacy as governor included the establishment of the Washington State Ferries system, the completion of road and bridge projects, and some of the first environmental measures adopted in the state of Washington.

Langlie left politics after failing in his 1956 campaign to defeat Democratic U.S. Senator Warren G. Magnuson. Los Angeles financier Norton Simon asked Langlie to take charge of the McCall publishing house that Simon had just acquired. In 1958, Langlie was named as the new president of the McCall Corporation.

== Other sources ==
- George W. Scott Arthur B. Langlie; Republican Governor in a Democratic Age (Ph.D. dissertation, University of Washington. 1971)

Political offices
Preceded by John F. Dore	Mayor of Seattle; 1938–1941	Succeeded by John E. Carroll
Preceded by Clarence D. Martin	Governor of Washington; 1941–1945	Succeeded by Monrad Wallgren
Preceded by Monrad Wallgren	Governor of Washington; 1949–1957	Succeeded by Albert Rosellini
Preceded by Robert F. Kennon	Chair of the National Governors Association; 1955–1956	Succeeded by Thomas B. Stanley
Party political offices
Preceded by Roland H. Hartley	Republican nominee for Governor of Washington; 1940, 1944, 1948, 1952	Succeeded by Emmett T. Anderson
Preceded by Douglas MacArthur	Keynote Speaker of the Republican National Convention; 1956	Succeeded by Walter Judd
Preceded by Walter Williams	Republican nominee for U.S. Senator from Washington (Class 3); 1956	Succeeded by Richard Christensen
