= Canadian Free Trade Agreement =

2017 interprovincial agreement

The Canadian Free Trade Agreement (CFTA) is an agreement that governs trade between the Canadian provinces and territories that took effect on July 1, 2017, replacing its predecessor, the 22-year old Agreement on Internal Trade (AIT).

== History ==
=== Background ===
As one of the most decentralized federations in the world, the question of internal economic and trade barriers in Canada has long been a controversial one. An important consequence of the division of powers between federal and provincial authorities under Canada's constitution (Constitution Act, 1867) was the establishment of separate systems of regulation for each province, resulting in regulatory diversity and non-tariff internal trade barriers between provinces, often cited as a reason for Canada's lagging productivity growth. Section 121 of the Constitution Act stated that "All Articles of the Growth, Produce, or Manufacture of any one of the Provinces shall, from and after the Union, be admitted free into each of the other Provinces". Despite this, provinces could continue with pre-existing customs and excise laws.

==== Original agreement (Agreement on Internal Trade, 1995) ====
The Agreement on Internal Trade (AIT) was an intergovernmental agreement entered into by the federal government and all ten provinces in 1994 with the goal of eliminating internal barriers to economic mobility within Canada.

The AIT came into effect in 1995 and eliminated barriers to free movement of people, goods, services and investments within Canada. Although motivated primarily by economic considerations, the AIT was seen by some as an attempt to renew the Canadian federation, building on previous failed attempts to amend the Constitution (e.g., the Charlottetown Accord), but through non-constitutional means.

In 2010, another interprovincial free trade deal between just four provinces (called the New West Partnership) came into effect between Alberta, British Columbia, Saskatchewan, and Manitoba building on and going further than AIT.

==== Updated agreement (Canadian Free Trade Agreement, 2017) ====
In December 2014, federal, provincial and territorial governments began negotiations to strengthen and modernize the AIT, guided by direction from premiers and the federal government to level the playing field for trade and investment in Canada.

At the annual summer Council of the Federation in July 2016, held in Whitehorse in the Yukon, the 13 premiers announced that they had concluded negotiations and had reached an agreement in principle to replace the AIT with a new, updated free trade agreement that would cover most of the Canadian economy and include a "negative list" approach, where sectors had to be explicitly exempted to avoid being covered.

The new Canadian Free Trade Agreement (CFTA) resulted from these negotiations, entering into force on July 1, 2017, and representing an updated and more comprehensive framework for internal trade within Canada, addressing some of the limitations faced by the earlier agreement.

=== Labour mobility provisions (Chapter 7) ===
The original 1995 the Agreement on Internal Trade (AIT) set out certain provisions related to labour mobility intended to eliminate barriers to the free movement of people across Canada by making it easier for certified workers to practice their regulated occupation in other provinces or territories. Specifically, the labour mobility provisions enable any worker certified to practice a regulated occupation by one Canadian jurisdiction to be recognized as qualified to practice that occupation in any other jurisdiction, wherever opportunities in that occupation exist.

The updated 2017 Canadian Free Trade Agreement (CFTA) reaffirmed and carried forward the Chapter 7 labour mobility provisions and obligations originally established under AIT. According to the Forum of Labour Market Ministers (FLMM) composed of federal and provincial/territorial Ministers responsible for the CFTA, ensuring that qualifications of certified workers are recognized when they move to another province or territory benefits both workers and employers alike, resulting in a wider range of employment opportunities for workers and a broader selection of candidates for employers.

== Reception ==
=== Original agreement (Agreement on Internal Trade, 1995) ===
In 2012, the RCMP led a sting operation against illegal alcohol imports across the Québec-New Brunswick border, arresting and issuing fines to seventeen people. One of those arrested in the operation, Gérard Comeau, then challenged the fine in courts, arguing that the import laws broke Section 121 of the Constitution Act, 1867. Comeau ultimately lost the court case, with the Supreme Court of Canada stating that "the Canadian federation provides space to each province to regulate the economy in a manner that reflects local concerns."

In 2016, the federal Standing Senate Committee on Banking, Trade and Commerce released a report titled Tear Down These Walls: Dismantling Canada’s Internal Trade Barriers, finding that internal trade barriers cost the Canadian economy up to $130 billion yearly and that "far too many unnecessary regulatory and legislative differences exist among Canada’s jurisdictions."

Negotiations of a new agreement were announced in 2016, with federal Minister of Innovation, Science and Industry Navdeep Bains stating that the agreement was more ambitious than the Comprehensive Economic and Trade Agreement between Canada and the European Union, however, alcohol remained excluded from the agreement despite lobbying efforts to include it.

=== Updated agreement (Canadian Free Trade Agreement, 2017) ===
Initial reactions to the agreement were largely positive, with supporters pointing to the increased liberalization in trade and that the agreement opened up the possibility to further decrease remaining barriers in the future.

Indicating the success of the AIT, a 2018 study found that trade barriers between provinces have declined by 15% over the previous 20 years.

The NGO Canadian Constitution Foundation stated that they expect the CFTA will bring slight improvements from the AIT, however, "no one should confuse it with real free trade."

Despite increased liberalization in trade, the agreement has been criticized by some commentators for not going far enough, with significant barriers remaining between the provinces. A 2019 working paper from the International Monetary Fund found that internal trade barriers continued to impact Canadian GDP despite the updated agreement and "significant scope to build on the new Canadian Free Trade Agreement", claiming that removing barriers to internal trade could increase Canada's GDP per capita by as much as 3.8%.

In July 2018, the premiers agreed in principle to significantly increase or remove personal exemption limits to allow Canadians to bring more alcohol with them when crossing provincial boundaries. A 2019 Ipsos poll found that 87% of those polled believed that Canadians should have the right to "bring any legally purchased product from one province to another" and that there should be free trade between the provinces.

In November 2018, the Alberta government launched a complaint under the agreement against Ontario over its regulation of Albertan alcoholic beverage sales in Ontario.

== Exemptions ==
Although the CFTA covers the entire economy instead of the 11 sections covered by the AIT, a large number of exemptions remain in the agreement. With approximately 160 pages of exemptions, over 300 exemptions, columnist Andrew Coyne said that it will only make matters "marginally better than they were."

In a July 2019 Summer Meeting, the provincial and territorial Premiers agreed to revise the CFTA with the goals of an "immediate amendment" to the CFTA to allow all governments to unilaterally remove or narrow interprovincial trade exceptions; and a review of their own CFTA exceptions by the end of 2019.

In July 2019, Premier of Alberta Jason Kenney announced that his government would be eliminating 13 of Alberta's 27 exemptions from the agreement. In September 2019, Jason Kenney announced that his government would be eliminating another eight Alberta-specific exemptions from the agreement. These moves changed Alberta from being the province with the third-highest number of specific exemptions to the one with the fewest.

In October 2019, Manitoba announced the removal of six exemptions, and the narrowing of one additional exemption.

In July 2024, the Government of Canada announced the removal or narrowing of 17 of its CFTA exceptions. In February 2025, the Government of Canada announced the removal of 20 of its remaining 39 CFTA exceptions, representing a removal of 64% of the Government of Canada's exceptions since the launch of the CFTA.
