= CFTA =

CFTA may refer to any of several free-trade agreements or free-trade areas:

- Continental Free Trade Area (see African Union)
- Canadian Free Trade Agreement
- Caribbean Free Trade Agreement (see Caribbean Community)
- UK - EU Comprehensive Free Trade Agreement (CFTA)

CFTA may also refer to:

- Campaign for the Arts, a UK charity
- Chemins de fer et transport automobile
