= National Conference of Governors =

Non-governmental organization in Mexico

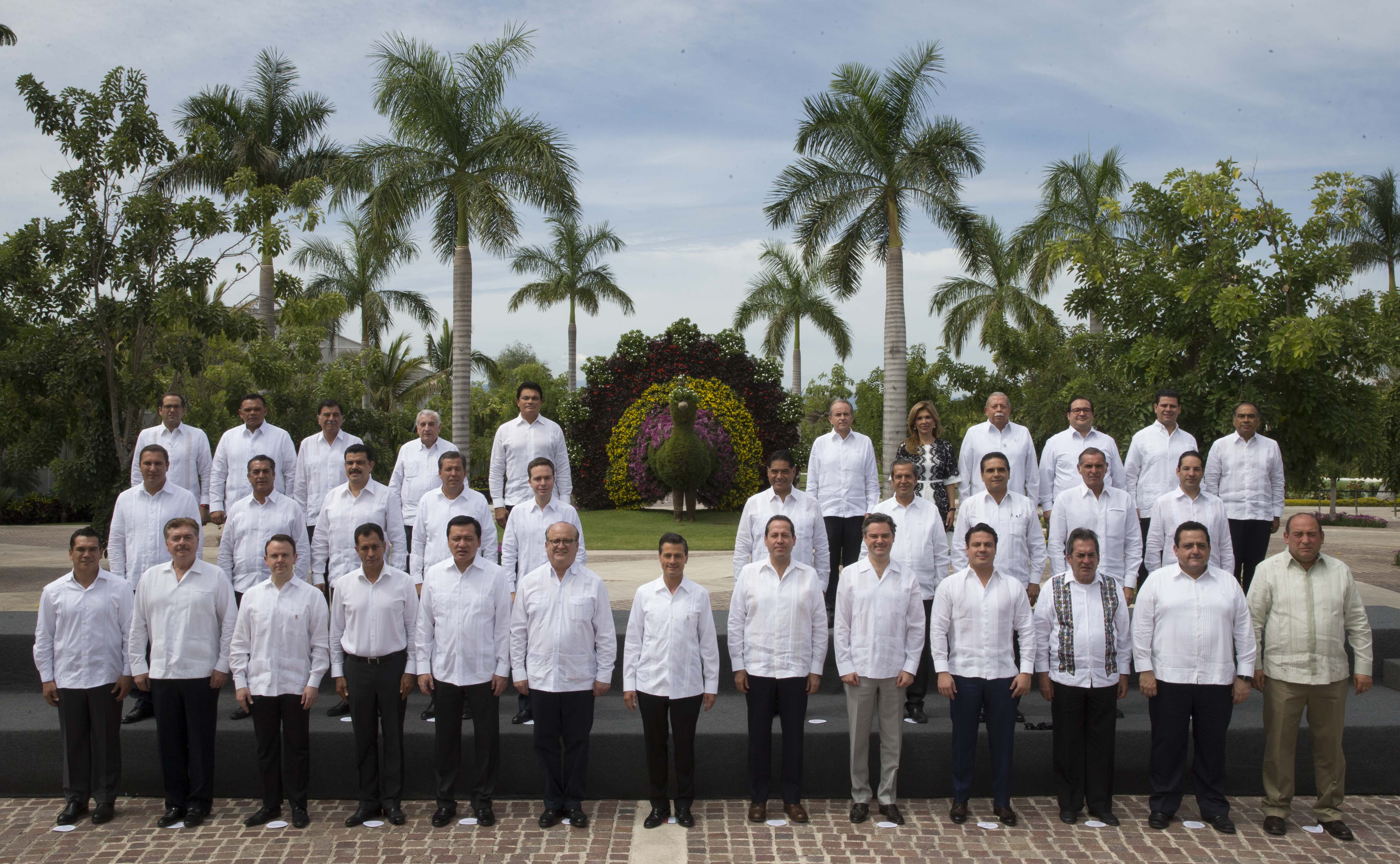
National Conference of Governors, October 2015.

The National Conference of Governors (Spanish: Conferencia Nacional de Gobernadores) is a non-governmental organization in Mexico that consists of the governors of the states of Mexico. The organization, known by the acronym CONAGO, was established in 2001 with a meeting of 20 governors in Mazatlan. The following year, 2002, marked the first meeting of CONAGO at which the governors of all 31 states attended.

Governors of ten states left the CONAGO on September 7, 2020. The governors all belong to the Alianza Federalista (Federalist Alliance) and they have criticized the government's responses to the health and economic responses to the COVID-19 pandemic in Mexico. The governors involved are Javier Corral Jurado (CHH PRI, chairman), José Rosas Aispuro (DUR PAN), Enrique Alfaro Ramírez (JAL, Independent), Silvano Aureoles Conejo (MIC PRD), Francisco Javier García Cabeza de Vaca (TAM, PRD), José Ignacio Peralta (COL MORENA), Miguel Ángel Riquelme Solís (COA MORENA), Jaime Rodríguez Calderón (NLE, Independent), Diego Sinhué Rodríguez Vallejo (GUA PAN, and Martín Orozco Sandoval (AGU PAN).

== See also ==
- List of current state governors in Mexico
- National Governors Association, a similar organization in the United States
- Conference of Minister-Presidents, a similar organization in Germany
