= National Governors Association =

American political organization founded in 1908

- Chair: Wes Moore (D-MD)
- Vice Chair: Mike Braun (R-IN)
- Executive Committee: Spencer Cox (R-UT); Josh Green (D-HI); Maura Healey (D-MA); Jeff Landry (R-LA); Phil Scott (R-VT); Josh Stein (D-NC); Kevin Stitt (R-OK)
- Founded: 1908; 118 years ago
- Headquarters: 444 N Capitol St; Suite 267; Washington, D.C., U.S.
- Affiliated: Bipartisan

Website
- nga.org

The National Governors Association (NGA) is an American political organization founded in 1908. The association's 55 members are the governors of the 50 states, 5 federal territories and commonwealths. Members come from across the political spectrum.

The NGA serves as a public policy liaison between state governments and the federal government. The NGA provides governors and their senior staff members with services that range from representing states on Capitol Hill and at the White House when discussing federal issues to developing policy reports on state programs and hosting networking seminars for state executive branch officials. The NGA Center for Best Practices focuses on state innovations and best practices on issues that range from education and health to technology, welfare reform, and the environment. The NGA also provides management and technical assistance to both new and incumbent governors.

The current NGA chair is Governor Wes Moore of Maryland, a Democrat. The current vice chair is Governor Mike Braun of Indiana, a Republican.

== History ==
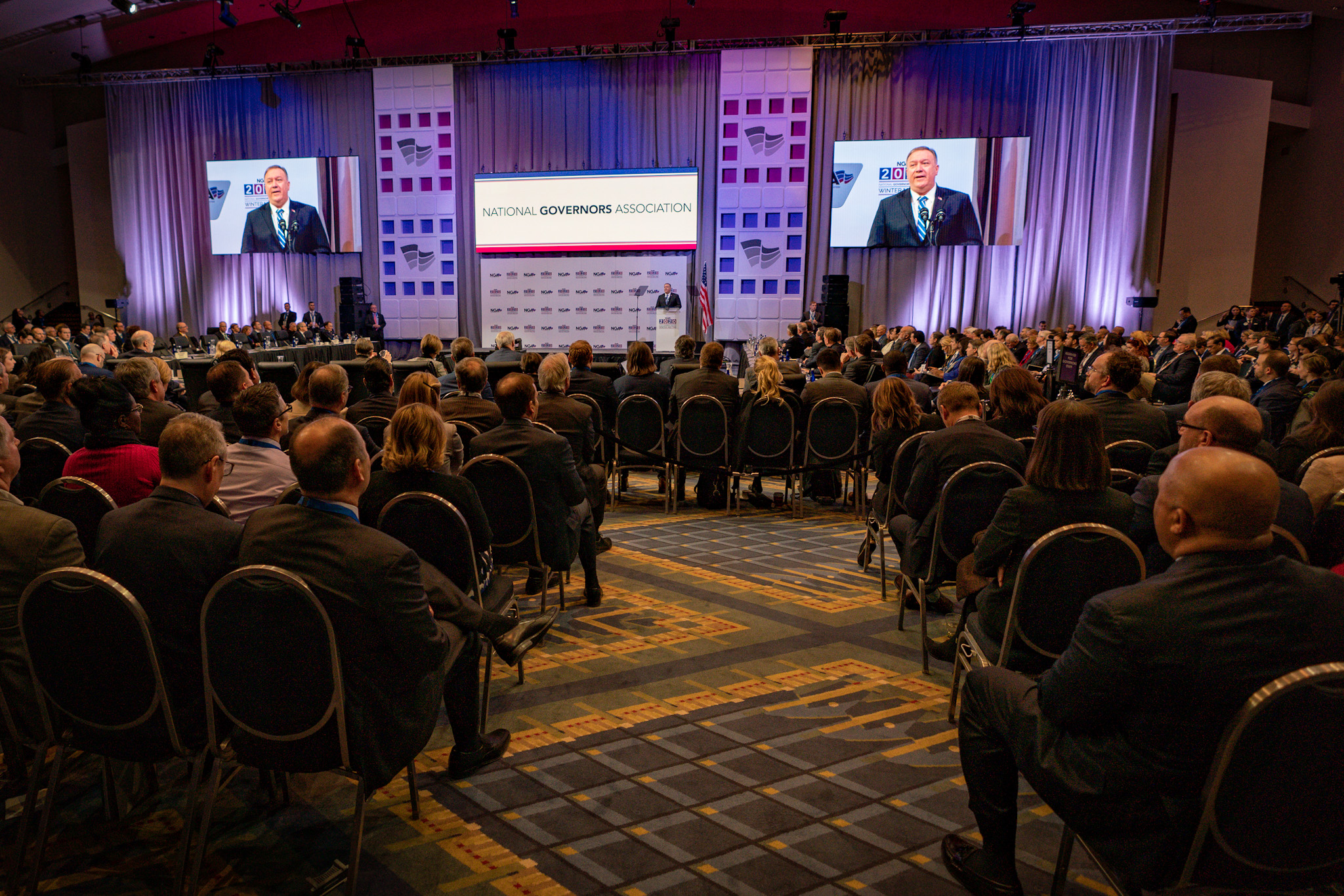
Secretary of State Mike Pompeo speaks at the National Governors Association's 2020 winter meeting.

In 1907, the Inland Waterways Commission thought it necessary to ask the Conference of Governors to provide both state and national views relating to practical questions dealing with natural resources utilization and management in the Progressive Era. The NGA represents the governors of the fifty U.S. states and five U.S. territories (American Samoa, Guam, the Northern Mariana Islands, Puerto Rico, and the U.S. Virgin Islands). It is funded primarily by state dues, federal grants and contracts, and private contributions.

The NGA adopted a policy in 1977 formalizing its standard practice dating back to 1941: The position of NGA chair alternates yearly between Republican and Democratic governors, so that neither party can control the position for two consecutive years. The vice chair is of the opposite party to the chair, and generally assumes the role of NGA chair the following year.

As of January 2025, Bill Clinton is the only former NGA chair to become president of the United States. Janet Napolitano became the first female chair in 2006.

The association's declaration of bipartisanship has been challenged after incidents such as statements made at the White House and on air by Louisiana governor Bobby Jindal during the 2014 annual summer meeting.

In February 2020, then secretary of state Mike Pompeo warned the National Governors Association that the Chinese Communist Party was actively attempting to influence U.S. policy through state governors and local officials. In October 2020, the United States Department of State discontinued U.S. participation in the U.S.-China Governors Forum to Promote Sub-National Cooperation due to alleged attempts by the Chinese People's Association for Friendship with Foreign Countries, a front organization for the CCP's United Front Work Department, to "malignly influence state and local leaders" in the U.S.

In July 2025 Democratic governors Laura Kelly of Kansas and Tim Walz of Minnesota, announced their intent to depart from the association citing a lack of criticism of policies during the second presidency of Donald Trump and criticism of the organization's response to incidents of Trump threatening federal funding and threatening federal interference in operations in Democratic-run states. Similarly, in October 2025, Democratic governors Gavin Newsom of California and JB Pritzker of Illinois issued separate statements threatening to withdraw their states from the association in protest of the organization's lack of any denouncements of the deployments of the National Guard against the wishes of affected state governors.

== Chairs ==
Formally adopted as policy in 1977, chairs preside for a one-year term and alternate party affiliation, so the same party never serves for two terms in a row. Traditionally, governors are first elected and serve as Vice-Chair/Chair-Elect the year before they serve as Chair.

The following states have never produced an NGA chair: Alabama, Alaska, Connecticut, Hawaii, Mississippi, New Mexico, North Carolina, Oregon, and South Dakota; nor have any of the five territories: American Samoa, Guam, the Northern Mariana Islands, Puerto Rico, and the U.S. Virgin Islands.

| Years | Chair | State | Party |
|---|---|---|---|
| 1908–1911 | Augustus Willson | Kentucky | Republican |
| 1911–1914 | Francis McGovern | Wisconsin | Republican |
| 1914–1915 | David Walsh | Massachusetts | Democratic |
| 1915–1916 | William Spry | Utah | Republican |
| 1916–1918 | Arthur Capper | Kansas | Republican |
| 1918–1919 | Emerson Harrington | Maryland | Democratic |
| 1919 | Henry Allen | Kansas | Republican |
| 1919–1922 | William Sproul | Pennsylvania | Republican |
| 1922–1924 | Channing Cox | Massachusetts | Republican |
| 1924–1925 | Lee Trinkle | Virginia | Democratic |
| 1925–1927 | Owen Brewster | Maine | Republican |
| 1927–1928 | Adam McMullen | Nebraska | Republican |
| 1928–1930 | George Dern | Utah | Democratic |
| 1930–1932 | Norman Case | Rhode Island | Republican |
| 1932–1933 | John Pollard | Virginia | Democratic |
| 1933–1934 | Jim Rolph | California | Republican |
| 1934–1936 | Paul McNutt | Indiana | Democratic |
| 1936–1937 | George Peery | Virginia | Democratic |
| 1937–1939 | Robert Cochran | Nebraska | Democratic |
| 1939–1940 | Lloyd Stark | Missouri | Democratic |
| 1940–1941 | William Vanderbilt | Rhode Island | Republican |
| 1941–1942 | Harold Stassen | Minnesota | Republican |
| 1942–1943 | Herbert O'Conor | Maryland | Democratic |
| 1943–1944 | Leverett Saltonstall | Massachusetts | Republican |
| 1944–1945 | Herbert Maw | Utah | Democratic |
| 1945–1946 | Ed Martin | Pennsylvania | Republican |
| 1946–1947 | Millard Caldwell | Florida | Democratic |
| 1947–1948 | Horace Hildreth | Maine | Republican |
| 1948–1949 | Lester Hunt | Wyoming | Democratic |
| 1949 | William Lane | Maryland | Democratic |
| 1949–1950 | Frank Carlson | Kansas | Republican |
| 1950–1951 | Frank Lausche | Ohio | Democratic |
| 1951–1952 | Val Peterson | Nebraska | Republican |
| 1952–1953 | Allan Shivers | Texas | Democratic |
| 1953–1954 | Daniel Thornton | Colorado | Republican |
| 1954–1955 | Bob Kennon | Louisiana | Democratic |
| 1955–1956 | Arthur Langlie | Washington | Republican |
| 1956–1957 | Thomas Stanley | Virginia | Democratic |
| 1957–1958 | William Stratton | Illinois | Republican |
| 1958–1959 | LeRoy Collins | Florida | Democratic |
| 1959–1960 | Cale Boggs | Delaware | Republican |
| 1960–1961 | Stephen McNichols | Colorado | Democratic |
| 1961–1962 | Wesley Powell | New Hampshire | Republican |
| 1962–1963 | Albert Rosellini | Washington | Democratic |
| 1963–1964 | John Anderson | Kansas | Republican |
| 1964–1965 | Grant Sawyer | Nevada | Democratic |
| 1965–1966 | John Reed | Maine | Republican |
| 1966–1967 | William Guy | North Dakota | Democratic |
| 1967–1968 | John Volpe | Massachusetts | Republican |
| 1968–1969 | Buford Ellington | Tennessee | Democratic |
| 1969–1970 | John Love | Colorado | Republican |
| 1970–1971 | Warren Hearnes | Missouri | Democratic |
| 1971–1972 | Arch A. Moore | West Virginia | Republican |
| 1972–1973 | Marvin Mandel | Maryland | Democratic |
| 1973–1974 | Daniel Evans | Washington | Republican |
| 1974–1975 | Cal Rampton | Utah | Democratic |
| 1975–1976 | Robert Ray | Iowa | Republican |
| 1976–1977 | Cecil Andrus | Idaho | Democratic |
| 1977 | Reubin Askew | Florida | Democratic |
| 1977–1978 | William Milliken | Michigan | Republican |
| 1978–1979 | Julian Carroll | Kentucky | Democratic |
| 1979–1980 | Otis Bowen | Indiana | Republican |
| 1980–1981 | George Busbee | Georgia | Democratic |
| 1981–1982 | Richard Snelling | Vermont | Republican |
| 1982–1983 | Scott Matheson | Utah | Democratic |
| 1983–1984 | Jim Thompson | Illinois | Republican |
| 1984–1985 | John Carlin | Kansas | Democratic |
| 1985–1986 | Lamar Alexander | Tennessee | Republican |
| 1986–1987 | Bill Clinton | Arkansas | Democratic |
| 1987–1988 | John Sununu | New Hampshire | Republican |
| 1988–1989 | Gerald Baliles | Virginia | Democratic |
| 1989–1990 | Terry Branstad | Iowa | Republican |
| 1990–1991 | Booth Gardner | Washington | Democratic |
| 1991–1992 | John Ashcroft | Missouri | Republican |
| 1992–1993 | Roy Romer | Colorado | Democratic |
| 1993–1994 | Carroll Campbell | South Carolina | Republican |
| 1994–1995 | Howard Dean | Vermont | Democratic |
| 1995–1996 | Tommy Thompson | Wisconsin | Republican |
| 1996–1997 | Bob Miller | Nevada | Democratic |
| 1997–1998 | George Voinovich | Ohio | Republican |
| 1998–1999 | Tom Carper | Delaware | Democratic |
| 1999–2000 | Mike Leavitt | Utah | Republican |
| 2000–2001 | Parris Glendening | Maryland | Democratic |
| 2001–2002 | John Engler | Michigan | Republican |
| 2002–2003 | Paul Patton | Kentucky | Democratic |
| 2003–2004 | Dirk Kempthorne | Idaho | Republican |
| 2004–2005 | Mark Warner | Virginia | Democratic |
| 2005–2006 | Mike Huckabee | Arkansas | Republican |
| 2006–2007 | Janet Napolitano | Arizona | Democratic |
| 2007–2008 | Tim Pawlenty | Minnesota | Republican |
| 2008–2009 | Ed Rendell | Pennsylvania | Democratic |
| 2009–2010 | Jim Douglas | Vermont | Republican |
| 2010 | Joe Manchin | West Virginia | Democratic |
| 2010–2011 | Christine Gregoire | Washington | Democratic |
| 2011–2012 | Dave Heineman | Nebraska | Republican |
| 2012–2013 | Jack Markell | Delaware | Democratic |
| 2013–2014 | Mary Fallin | Oklahoma | Republican |
| 2014–2015 | John Hickenlooper | Colorado | Democratic |
| 2015–2016 | Gary Herbert | Utah | Republican |
| 2016–2017 | Terry McAuliffe | Virginia | Democratic |
| 2017–2018 | Brian Sandoval | Nevada | Republican |
| 2018–2019 | Steve Bullock | Montana | Democratic |
| 2019–2020 | Larry Hogan | Maryland | Republican |
| 2020–2021 | Andrew Cuomo | New York | Democratic |
| 2021–2022 | Asa Hutchinson | Arkansas | Republican |
| 2022–2023 | Phil Murphy | New Jersey | Democratic |
| 2023–2024 | Spencer Cox | Utah | Republican |
| 2024–2025 | Jared Polis | Colorado | Democratic |
| 2025–2026 | Kevin Stitt | Oklahoma | Republican |
| 2026–present | Wes Moore | Maryland | Democratic |

NOTES
- Cecil Andrus resigned as Governor of Idaho upon being confirmed as Secretary of the Interior in January 1977. Florida's Reubin Askew completed Andrus' unexpired term as chair.
- Joe Manchin resigned as Governor of West Virginia when he was elected to the United States Senate in November 2010. Washington's Christine Gregoire completed Manchin's unexpired term as chair.

== See also ==
- Executive federalism
- National Cabinet (Australia), a similar body in Australia
- Council of the Federation, a similar body in Canada
- Inter-State Council, a similar body in India
- Council of the Nations and Regions, a similar body in the United Kingdom
- National Governors Association of Japan
- National Governors Conference (Mexico), a similar organization in Mexico
- Conference of Ministers-President, a similar body in Germany
- European Council, a similar body in the European Union
- United States Conference of Mayors
- Republican Governors Association
- Democratic Governors Association
- Governors Highway Safety Association
