= List of Austrian state governors =

Australian state governors

Lists of Austrian state governors cover the governors, or Landeshauptleute of the states of Austria. The governor is the head of the state government, with a function that is equivalent to that of a premier.

== Lists of state ==
- List of governors of Burgenland
- List of governors of Carinthia
- List of governors of Lower Austria
- List of governors of Salzburg (state)
- List of governors of Styria
- List of governors of Tyrol
- List of governors of Upper Austria
- List of governors of Vorarlberg

== See also ==
- Conference of State Governors (Austria)
