= Tilma =

Tilma may refer to:

- Tilmàtli (also Tilma), outer garment
  - Tilma of Guadalupe, alternate name of the cloak affiliated with Our Lady of Guadalupe
- Trade, Investment and Labour Mobility Agreement
