= Premiers Conference =

Premiers Conference or Premiers' Conference may refer to:

- Council of Australian Governments
- First Ministers' conference in Canada
