= Conference of State Governors (Austria) =

The Conference of State Governors (German: Landeshauptleutekonferenz) is an informal – not provided for in the Constitution of Austria – meeting of the nine state governors. Alongside the Federal Council, the Austrian upper house, it is the second most important body for co-operation between the states as well as for federalism in the Austrian political system (in the modern Austria). The Council of state governors is considered to be "the most powerful governing institution of the federal states" and a motor for strengthening the federal state", the Federal Council itself is regarded as having little influence in Austria. Its importance is also reflected in the fact that although it has no constitutional basis, numerous legal texts refer to it.

== Functioning ==
At the Conference of State Governors, an attempt is made to establish a common channel for representing the interests federal states in order to be able to take this unified position and to confront the federation in negotiations. They developed in the 1960s and have met regularly from the 1970 onwards.

They are prepared by the state government directors (Vienna: the magistrate director), who then participate in the conferences together with the state governors. Generally also a representative of the federal government - the chancellor or a federal minister - attend the conference. Talks with the president also occur. According to established practice, the presidency between the states changes every six months and in alphabetical order of the states in parallel with the change of the Federal Council. In addition tot the half-yearly meetings, the Conference of State Governors also convenes extraordinary meetings when urgent matters arise. The Liaison Office of the States acts as the secretariat of the conference. There are no written rules of procedure.

The Conference of State Governors only take decisions unanimously. Due to the informal nature of the meetings, decisions will not be published, but will be made available to the participants and the federal government, insofar as it is affected by them. These decisions are not legally binding, but have a significant political impact. Due to their unanimity, they represent a reliable - albeit potentially minimal - common position at the state level.

The conference is particularly important for the fiscal redistribution from the federal government to the states and the "eternal construction" reform of the federal states.

== History ==
In 1968, the then Governor of Salzburg, Hans Lechner (ÖVP) explained the functioning of the Conference of State Governors in the ORF broadcast of Österreich-Bild.

On the 100th anniversary of the foundation of the republic of Austria an extraordinary conference took place in 2018 which also addressed the relationship between the federal states as regions in the European Union.

== See also ==
- Conference of Ministers-President – German equivalent
- European Council
- Region (Europe)
- European Committee of the Regions
- Executive federalism
