= Federal-State Conference (Germany) =

The Federal-State Conference (officially: "Conference of the Federal Chancellor with the Heads of Government of the States") is an unofficial body of the Federal Government and the federal states that was convened for the first time on 12 March 2020 to coordinate measures under the Infection Protection Act (Infektionsschutzgesetz, IfSG) to combat the COVID-19 pandemic in Germany nationwide.

== Constitutional basis ==
The Federal-State Conference is not a constitutional body, is not involved in federal or state legislation, and cannot issue legally binding regulations. There is no legal basis for the body. The existence of the Federal-State Conference is indirectly made possible by the Basic Law. The federal government and the states can coordinate on measures that fall within the responsibility of the states. The Basic Law does not exclude this. The implementation of the Infection Protection Act, on the basis of which many measures against the COVID-19 pandemic are being taken, falls within the scope of state administration. The resolutions and agreements made during the conference are political declarations of intent with no legal effect. They must be implemented by the federal government or the states in the form of ordinances or laws (Section 32 IfSG, Article 80 Paragraph 4 GG).

== Organisation and functioning ==
The federal-state conferences are organized by the German Chancellery. The group of participants will be determined depending on the main topics of the respective meetings. In addition to the Federal Chancellor and the incumbent heads of government of the states, regular participants also include the head of the Federal Chancellery and the heads of the state chancelleries of the states The members of the Federal Government who are responsible for the subject matter and are affected attend the conferences as appropriate. Expert hearings can take place during the meetings, to which expert scientists and representatives of the Robert Koch Institute and the Charité are invited. The draft resolutions are often coordinated with the chair and co-chair states of the Conference of Ministers-President. The decisions of the Federal-State Conferences are made according to the consensus principle. The Federal Chancellery prepares brief minutes of the meetings, which are subject to confidentiality. The decisions are published.

== Conferences ==
The Federal-State Conference met for the first time on 12 March 2020 on the occasion of the COVID-19 pandemic

=== Participants ===
The following members of the federal and state governments of the ministries as well as representatives of the ministries at the federal and state level took part in the meetings. The ministry responsible for the subject matter were or will be invited in individual cases.

Participant (until December 2021)	Participant (since December 2021)	Funktion
Angela Merkel	Olaf Scholz	Bundeskanzler
Helge Braun	Wolfgang Schmidt	Head of the Federal Chancellery
Olaf Scholz	Christian Lindner	Federal Minister of Finance
Peter Altmaier	Robert Habeck	Federal Minister for the Economy and Climate
Jens Spahn	Karl Lauterbach	Federal Minister for Health
Andreas Scheuer	Volker Wissing	Federal Minister for Transport and Digital Infrastructure
Svenja Schulze	Steffi Lemke	Federal Minister for the Environment, Nature Conservation, Nuclear Safety and Consumer Protection
Anja Karliczek	Bettina Stark-Watzinger	Federal Minister of Education and Research
Hendrik Hoppenstedt		Minister of State to the Federal Chancellor
Niels Annen		Minister of State in the Federal Foreign Office
Markus Kerber		Minister of State in the Federal Ministry of the Interior
Margaretha Sudhof		Minister of State in the Federal Ministry of Justice
Beate Kasch		Minister of State in the Federal Ministry of Food and Agriculture
Acting heads of government of the states
Heads of the State Chancelleries
Heyo K. Kroemer		Chairman of the board of Charité
Christian Drosten		Director of the Institute of Virology at Charité
Lothar H. Wieler		President of the Robert Koch Institute

=== Dates ===
The following conferences took place up to and including 22 March 2021:

- 12 March 2020
- 16 March 2020
- 22 March 2020
- 1 April 2020
- 15 April 2020
- 30 April 2020
- 6 May 2020
- 26 May 2020
- 17 June 2020
- 16 July 2020
- 27 August 2020
- 29 September 2020
- 7 October 2020
- 14 October 2020
- 28 October 2020
- 16 November 2020
- 25 November 2020
- 2 December 2020
- 13 December 2020
- 5 January 2021
- 19 January 2021
- 1 February 2021 (Vaccination discussion)
- 10 February 2021
- 3 March 2021
- 19 March 2021 (Vaccination discussion)
- 22 March 2021

The date scheduled for April 12, 2021 did not take place.

With the entry into force of the Fourth Act to Protect the Population in the Event of an Epidemic Situation of National Significance, uniform protective measures to prevent the spread of coronavirus disease 2019 (COVID-19) in the event of a particular infection (so-called federal emergency brake) were in force nationwide from April 23 to June 30, 2021. In addition, the Federal Government is empowered to issue special regulations for vaccinated, tested and comparable persons by means of a legal ordinance. This legal ordinance requires the approval of the Bundestag and the Bundesrat. The draft regulation was discussed at a federal-state conference on 26 April 2021; the regulation came into force on 9 May 2021.

As a result of the vaccination progress, the frequency of federal-state conferences decreased. Further dates from May 2021:

- 27 May 2021
- 10 August 2021
- (20-22 October 2021, Conference of Ministers-Presiden without federal participation)
- 18 November 2021
- 2 December 2021
- 9 December 2021

=== Protocols ===
In its ruling of June 30, 2022, the Berlin Administrative Court ordered the Federal Chancellery to release minutes of meetings from 2020 to the Berlin Der Tagesspiegel newspaper on the basis of the Freedom of Information Act.
