= Conference of Minister-Presidents =

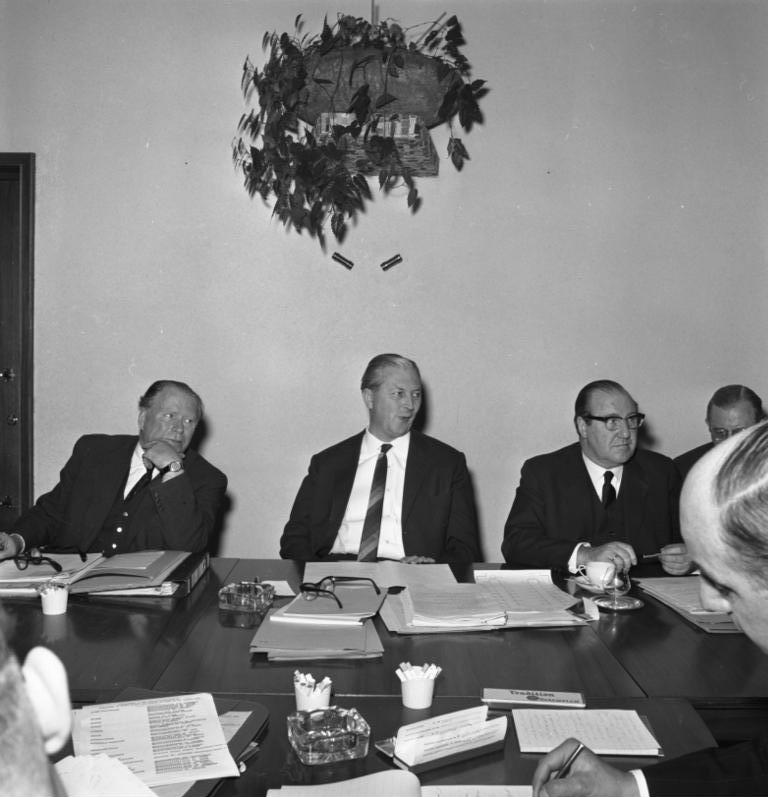
Prime Ministers during the conference in the state representation of Baden-Württemberg; from left: Hans Ehard, Bavaria; Kurt Georg Kiesinger, Baden-Württemberg; Franz Meyers, North Rhine-Westphalia

The Conference of Minister-Presidents (German: Ministerpräsidentenkonferenz, MPK) is a committee formed by the sixteen States of Germany (Bundesländer) to coordinate policy in areas that fall within the sole jurisdiction of the Länder, e.g. broadcasting. The conference is not a constitutional body, therefore formal agreements between the federal states are fixed in a Staatsvertrag (treaty/compact). Since the MPK itself is not an official constitutional body, its meetings are purely informal, coordinating in nature. Similar bodies also exist at the level of the specialist ministers (such as the Conference of Ministers of Education and Cultural Affairs)

The first meeting of the conference took place in 8–10 July 1948, preceding the formation of the Federal Republic of Germany.

The measures against the COVID-19 pandemic in Germany were coordinated by the Federal-State Conference until 2021.

== History ==
=== Formation ===
The first meeting of the minister-presidents of all German states after the Second World War took place in Munich at the beginning of June 1947. However, the representatives of the states of Thuringia, Saxony-Anhalt, Saxony, Mecklenburg-Western Pomerania and the Margraviate of Brandenburg left the conference right at the beginning of the discussions because they were unable to get their demand for the immediate formation of a German central administration accepted. The West German prime ministers then continued the conference alone.

=== Rittersturz Conference ===
The meeting of the heads of government of the states of the three western occupation zones from 8 to 10 July 1948 in Koblenz is considered to be the "actual birth of the Conference of Prime Ministers" (even before the founding of the Federal Republic of Germany). This conference, which went down in history as the Rittersturz Conference (named after the meeting venue, the Hotel Rittersturz), debated the Frankfurt Documents and agreed on a partial concurrence, the Koblenz Decisions. They decided to set up the Parliamentary Council to draft the Basic Law and thus paved the way for the founding of the Federal Republic of Germany.

=== Later Meetings ===
Since 1954 the Conference of Minister-Presidents has been a permanent institution. The first MPK chairman was the then Bavarian Prime Minister Hans Ehard. Since reunification, the five new states have also taken part in the conference. In autumn 1992, an eastern state - Saxony - took over the chairmanship for the first time.

== Constitutional basis ==
Unlike the Bundesrat, the Conference of Prime Ministers is not a constitutional body and is not involved in federal or state legislation. Its decisions are therefore not legally binding and may first have to be implemented through legislative procedures in the individual states. The basis for this is federalism in Germany (Article 20 Paragraph 1 of the Basic Law), according to which the states are independent member states of the Federal Republic of Germany. This allows each state to shape its own areas of competence independently (Articles 30, 70, 83 of the Basic Law) and to cooperate with other states in doing so. In order not to impair the powers of the Bundesrat, the Conference of Prime Ministers decided on December 17, 1992, that a matter may not be discussed in a Conference of Ministers (Presidents) if it is the subject of deliberations in the Bundesrat.

== Organisation and functioning ==
The Conference of Minister-Presidents takes place four times a year. In summer and December, the heads of government of the states meet for a meeting with the Federal Chancellor after the MPK. If there is a particular need, additional special conferences are held. This has been the case for example for the federalism reform and the equalization payments to the states. The Conference of Minister-Presidents is prepared by the heads of the state and senate chancelleries of the states in appropriate conferences (CdS conferences). If the head of government of the presiding state is personally unable to attend an MPK, a member of the state government with ministerial rank, usually the head of the state or senate chancellery, takes over his place.

Topics of the discussions in recent years have been European policy, federalism reform, federal-state financial relations, media and education policy. Special topics are dealt with in confidential rounds of discussions, the so-called fireside chats. Only the heads of government take part in these discussions, without their staff.

Decisions always had to be made unanimously until the end of 2004. This consensus principle was relaxed during the discussions on federalism reform in order to strengthen the ability of the federal states to act. Since the end of 2004, decisions have only required the approval of at least 13 states. Exceptions to this are the rules of procedure, budgetary matters and the creation of community institutions. The principle of unanimity still applies here. The prime ministers of the A states and those of the B states usually hold separate preliminary discussions before the conference in order to determine the negotiating position.

The Conference of Minister-Presidents also proposes a list of 21 of the 24 German members (and the same number of deputies) of the European Committee of the Regions to the federal government, which then proposes the full list of elected representatives to the EU Council of Ministers for appointment for the five-year term of office.

== Change of chairmanship ==
The chairmanship of the Conference of Minister-Presidents changes annually according to an agreed order. The chairman is the Prime Minister of the respective state.

A separate regulation concerns the co-chairmanship as coordinator and spokesperson of the politically competing group of states (A and B states) in the traditionally concluding press conferences of the MPK. If the MPK chairmanship changes and there is a transition from A state to B state (or vice versa), the outgoing Prime Minister remains co-chairman of his group of states until the MPK chairmanship falls back to his own group of states. For example, after the MPK chairmanship passed from Berlin to North Rhine-Westphalia in 2005, MP Klaus Wowereit was co-chairman of the social democratic-led A states for a further 4 years (chairmanship by the B states NW, NI, HE, SN) until he was replaced by MP Kurt Beck (Rhineland-Palatinate) in 2009.

Until reunification in 1990, the presidency rotated between the eleven federal states at the time in the following order:

1. Bavaria
2. Berlin
3. North Rhine-Westphalia
4. Lower Saxony
5. Hesse
6. Rhineland-Palatinate
7. Schleswig-Holstein
8. Baden-Württemberg
9. Bremen
10. Saarland
11. Hamburg

The chair of the meeting is rotated on an annual basis among the federal states according to a fixed rotation:

1. Lower Saxony
2. Hesse
3. Saxony
4. Rhineland-Palatinate
5. Saxony-Anhalt
6. Schleswig-Holstein
7. Thuringia
8. Baden-Württemberg
9. Brandenburg
10. Bremen
11. Mecklenburg-Vorpommern
12. Saarland
13. Hamburg
14. Bavaria
15. Berlin
16. North Rhine-Westphalia

=== List of chairs ===
| Party | Name of chair | State | Party | Name of deputy chair | State | Duration |
|---|---|---|---|---|---|---|
| CSU | Hans Ehard | Bavaria | | | | 1 October 1954 – 30 September 1955 |
| SPD | Otto Suhr | Berlin | | | | 1 October 1955 – 30 September 1956 |
| ... | ... | ... | | | | |
| CSU | Franz Josef Strauß | Bavaria | | | | 1 October 1987 – 30 September 1988 |
| CDU | Eberhard Diepgen | Berlin | | | | 1 October 1987 – 30 September 1988 |
| SPD | Walter Momper | Berlin | | | | 1 October 1988 – 30 September 1989 |
| SPD | Johannes Rau | North Rhine-Westphalia | | | | 1 October 1989 – 30 September 1990 |
| SPD | Gerhard Schröder | Lower Saxony | | | | 1 October 1990 – 30 September 1991 |
| SPD | Hans Eichel | Hesse | | | | 1 October 1991 – 30 September 1992 |
| CDU | Kurt Biedenkopf | Saxony | SPD | Hans Eichel | Hesse | 1 October 1992 – 30 September 1993 |
| SPD | Rudolf Scharping | Rhineland-Palatinate | CDU | Kurt Biedenkopf | Saxony | 1 October 1993 – 30 September 1994 |
| SPD | Reinhard Höppner | Saxony-Anhalt | CDU | Kurt Biedenkopf | Saxony | 1 October 1994 – 30 September 1995 |
| CDU | Henning Schwarz | Schleswig-Holstein | SPD | Reinhard Höppner | Saxony-Anhalt | 1 October 1995 – 30 September 1996 |
| CDU | Bernhard Vogel | Thuringia | SPD | Reinhard Höppner | Saxony-Anhalt | 1 October 1996 – 30 September 1997 |
| CDU | Erwin Teufel | Baden-Württemberg | SPD | Reinhard Höppner | Saxony-Anhalt | 1 October 1997 – 30 September 1998 |
| SPD | Manfred Stolpe | Brandenburg | CDU | Erwin Teufel | Baden-Württemberg | 1 October 1998 – 30 September 1999 |
| SPD | Henning Scherf | Bremen | CDU | Erwin Teufel | Baden-Württemberg | 1 October 1999 – 30 September 2000 |
| SPD | Harald Ringstorff | Mecklenburg-Vorpommern | CDU | Erwin Teufel | Baden-Württemberg | 1 October 2000 – 30 September 2001 |
| CDU | Peter Müller | Saarland | SPD | Harald Ringstorff | Mecklenburg-Vorpommern | 1 October 2001 – 30 September 2002 |
| CDU | Ole von Beust | Bremen | SPD | Harald Ringstorff | Mecklenburg-Vorpommern | 1 October 2002 – 30 September 2003 |
| CSU | Edmund Stoiber | Bavaria | SPD | Harald Ringstorff | Mecklenburg-Vorpommern | 1 October 2003 – 30 September 2004 |
| SPD | Klaus Wowereit | Berlin | CSU | Edmund Stoiber | Bavaria | 1 October 2004 – 30 September 2005 |
| CDU | Jürgen Rüttgers | North Rhine-Westphalia | SPD | Klaus Wowereit | Mecklenburg-Vorpommern | 1 October 2005 – 30 September 2006 |
| CDU | Christian Wulff | Lower Saxony | SPD | Klaus Wowereit | Mecklenburg-Vorpommern | 1 October 2006 – 30 September 2007 |
| CDU | Roland Koch | Hessen | SPD | Klaus Wowereit | Mecklenburg-Vorpommern | 1 October 2007 – 30 September 2008 |
| CDU | Stanislaw Tillich | Saxony | SPD | Klaus Wowereit | Mecklenburg-Vorpommern | 1 October 2008 – 30 September 2009 |
| SPD | Kurt Beck | Rhineland-Palatinate | CDU | Stanislaw Tillich | Saxony | 1 October 2009 – 30 September 2010 |
| CDU | Wolfgang Böhmer | Saxony-Anhalt | SPD | Kurt Beck | Rhineland-Palatinate | 1 October 2010 – 19 April 2011 |
| CDU | Reiner Haseloff | Saxony-Anhalt | SPD | Kurt Beck | Rhineland-Palatinate | 19 April 2011 – 30 September 2011 |
| CDU | Jürgen Rüttgers | Schleswig-Holstein | | | | 1 October 2011 – 12 June 2012 |
| SPD | Torsten Albig | Schleswig-Holstein | | | | 12 June 2012 – 30 September 2012 |
| CDU | Christine Lieberknecht | Thuringia | SPD | Torsten Albig | Schleswig-Holstein | 1 October 2012 – 30 September 2013 |
| Greens | Winfried Kretschmann | Baden-Württemberg | CDU | Christine Lieberknecht | Thuringia | 1 October 2013 – 30 September 2014 |
| SPD | Dietmar Woidke | Brandenburg | CDU | Christine Lieberknecht | Thuringia | 1 October 2014 – 30 September 2015 |
| SPD | Carsten Sieling | Bremen | CDU | Christine Lieberknecht | Thuringia | 1 October 2015 – 30 September 2016 |
| SPD | Erwin Sellering | Mecklenburg-Vorpommern | CDU | Christine Lieberknecht | Thuringia | 1 October 2016 – 1 July 2017 |
| SPD | Manuela Schwesig | Mecklenburg-Vorpommern | CDU | Christine Lieberknecht | Thuringia | 1 July 2017 – 1 October 2017 |
| CDU | Annegret Kramp-Karrenbauer | Saarland | SPD | Manuela Schwesig | Mecklenburg-Vorpommern | 1 October 2017 – 28 February 2018 |
| CDU | Tobias Hans | Saarland | SPD | Manuela Schwesig | Mecklenburg-Vorpommern | 28 February 2018 – 1 March 2018 |
| SPD | Peter Tschentscher | Hamburg | CDU | Tobias Hans | Saarland | 1 October 2018 – 28 February 2019 |
| CSU | Markus Söder | Bavaria | SPD | Peter Tschentscher | Hamburg | 1 October 2019 – 28 February 2020 |
| SPD | Michael Müller | Bavaria | CSU | Markus Söder | Bavaria | 1 October 2020 – 30 September 2021 |
| CDU | Armin Laschet | North Rhine-Westphalia | SPD | Michael Müller | Berlin | 1 October 2021 – 25 October 2021 |
| CDU | Hendrik Wüst | North Rhine-Westphalia | SPD | Michael Müller | Berlin | 25 October 2021 – 21 December 2021 |
| CDU | Hendrik Wüst | North Rhine-Westphalia | SPD | Franziska Giffey | Berlin | 21 December 2021 – 30 September 2022 |
| SPD | Stephan Weil | Lower Saxony | CDU | Hendrik Wüst | North Rhine-Westphalia | 1 October 2022 – 30 September 2023 |
| CDU | Boris Rhein | Hesse | SPD | Stephan Weil | Lower Saxony | 1 October 2023 – 30 September 2024 |

== See also ==
- Executive federalism
- Minister president (Germany)
- Federal-State Conference (Germany)
- Conference of State Governors (Austria)
- Conference of the Cantonal Governments, Switzerland
