= First Ministers' conference =

Meeting between Canadian heads of government and the Prime Minister

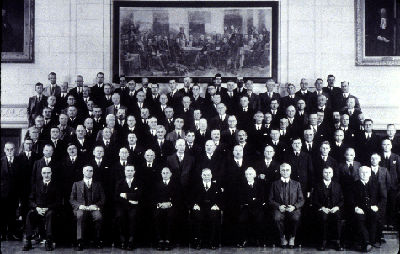
First Minister's conference delegation, 1927

In Canada, a First Ministers' conference (or First Ministers' meeting) is a meeting of the provincial and territorial premiers and the Prime Minister. These events are held at the call of the prime minister. They are usually held in Ottawa.

Though known as "First Ministers' conferences" only since the 1960s, they ultimately trace their origin to the initial constitutional convention held in the mid-1860s at Charlottetown, Prince Edward Island, then-capital of the British Province of Prince Edward Island. After confederation, two conferences of provincial premiers were held, in 1887 and 1902, in which the federal government was not represented.

Altogether, 98 First Ministers' conferences have been held since the first was convened by Prime Minister Sir Wilfrid Laurier in 1906, at the request of the provinces. Some important First Ministers' conferences were those leading up to the Meech Lake and Charlottetown Accords. The failed Charlottetown Accord contained a provision that would have made annual First Ministers' conferences obligatory. Under Prime Minister Mark Carney, these conferences began being routinely held.

The conferences are important for a number of reasons. A sizable portion of provincial funding (referred to as transfer payments) comes from the federal government, the conferences are an opportunity for the premiers to lobby for more money. Today it is common for the Premiers to meet beforehand to present a common front to the federal government. They are also important in that Canada's federal system leaves a fair amount of overlap between federal and provincial jurisdictions and most large initiatives require some provincial support.

The vast majority of the activity at a First Ministers' conference takes place behind closed doors. A public statement is issued after the conference.

Formerly, the government leaders of the territories were only occasionally invited to these conferences, depending on whether issues especially relevant to the north are being discussed. Today, these leaders normally attend the meetings. The national chief of the Assembly of First Nations may also be invited to attend when issues especially relevant to First Nations communities are on the agenda; the group has lobbied for greater inclusion.

== List of First Ministers' conferences to date ==
Number	Prime Minister	Name	Location	Date	Topics
1	Sir Wilfrid Laurier	Conference of the Representatives of the Government of Canada and the Various Provinces	Ottawa	October 8–13, 1906	Financial subsidies to the provinces
2	Sir Robert Borden, but Sir William Thomas White chaired the conference as Acting Prime Minister	Conference between the Members of the Government of Canada and of the Various Provincial Governments Acting	Ottawa	November 19–22, 1918	Soldier and land settlement, transfer of natural resources
3	W.L. Mackenzie King	Dominion–Provincial Conference	Ottawa	November 3–10, 1927	Various subjects listed under "Constitutional", "Financial" and "Social and Economic" titles
4	R.B. Bennett	Dominion–Provincial Conference	Ottawa	April 7–8, 1931	Statute of Westminster
5	R.B. Bennett	Dominion–Provincial Conference	Ottawa	April 8–9, 1932	Unemployment relief
6	R.B. Bennett	Dominion–Provincial Conference	Ottawa	January 17–19, 1933	Various subjects including unemployment, old age pensions, company law and overlapping federal and provincial jurisdictions
7	R.B. Bennett	Dominion–Provincial Conference	Ottawa	January 18–19, 1934	Various subjects including employment, financial position of provinces, company law, taxes on liquor, Pacific Great Eastern Railway Company, B.C. claim for equality of treatment
8	W.L. Mackenzie King	Dominion–Provincial Conference	Ottawa	December 9–13, 1935	Various subjects including constitutional amendment, federal–provincial financial relations, taxation, social services
9	W.L. Mackenzie King	Dominion–Provincial Conference	Ottawa	January 14–15, 1941	Recommendations of Rowell-Sirois Commission (federal–provincial fiscal relations)
10	W.L. Mackenzie King	Dominion–Provincial Conference on Reconstruction	Ottawa	August 6–10, 1945	Postwar reconstruction and federal–provincial financial arrangements
11	W.L. Mackenzie King	Dominion–Provincial Conference on Reconstruction	Ottawa	April 29 – May 3, 1946	Financial arrangements, public investment, health, old age pensions, unemployment
12	Louis St. Laurent	Constitutional Conference of Federal and Provincial Governments	Ottawa	January 10–12, 1950	Constitutional amendment
13	Louis St. Laurent	Constitutional Conference of Federal and Provincial Governments	Quebec City	September 25–28, 1950	Constitutional amendment
14	Louis St. Laurent	Conference of Federal and Provincial Governments	Ottawa	December 4–7, 1950	Tax agreements, old age security, provincial indirect sales tax
15	Louis St. Laurent	Federal–Provincial Conference 1955, Preliminary Meeting	Ottawa	April 26–27, 1955	Federal relief for unemployed persons, and preparation of next Conference
16	Louis St. Laurent	Federal–Provincial Conference	Ottawa	October 3–6, 1955	Fiscal relations, natural resources development, establishment of a federal–provincial Continuing Committee, health and welfare
17	Louis St. Laurent	Dominion–Provincial Conference	Ottawa	March 9, 1956	Federal–provincial fiscal arrangements
18	John Diefenbaker	Dominion–Provincial Conference	Ottawa	November 25–26, 1957	Hospital insurance, costs of assistance to persons in need, assistance to Atlantic provinces, fiscal matters
19	John Diefenbaker	Dominion–Provincial Conference	Ottawa	July 25–27, 1960	Various tax matters including personal and corporate income taxes, equalization, indirect provincial sales tax, taxation of natural resources. Conditional grants and shared cost programs
20	John Diefenbaker	Dominion–Provincial Conference	Ottawa	October 26–28, 1960	Federal–provincial fiscal arrangements
21	John Diefenbaker	Federal–Provincial Conference	Ottawa	February 23–24, 1961	Federal–provincial fiscal arrangements
22	Lester B. Pearson	Federal Provincial Conference	Ottawa	July 26–27, 1963	Municipal loan and development fund, Canada Pension Plan
23	Lester B. Pearson	Federal–Provincial Conference	Ottawa	November 26–29, 1963	Various subjects including state of the Canadian Economy, conditional grants and shared cost programs, fiscal relations, Canadian Pension Plan
24	Lester B. Pearson	Federal–Provincial Conference	Quebec City	March 31 – April 1, 1964	Shared cost programs and fiscal arrangements, Canada Pension Plan, taxation, fiscal relations, loans to university students
25	Lester B. Pearson	Federal–Provincial Conference	Charlottetown	August 31 – September 2, 1964	Constitutional amendment
26	Lester B. Pearson	Federal–Provincial Conference	Ottawa	October 14–15, 1964	Constitutional amendment, Tax Structure Committee, off-shore mineral rights
27	Lester B. Pearson	Federal–Provincial Conference	Ottawa	July 19–22, 1965	Various subjects including Social Security, Economic Development, Tax Structure Committee, Transportation and Inland Water Resources
28	Lester B. Pearson	Federal–Provincial Conference	Ottawa	October 24–28, 1966	Financing of higher education, federal–provincial fiscal arrangements
29	Lester B. Pearson	Federal–Provincial Conference on Housing and Urban Development	Ottawa	December 11–12, 1967	Housing and urban development
30	Lester B. Pearson	Constitutional Conference	Ottawa	February 5–7, 1968	Constitutional review, Recommendations of Royal Commission on Bilingualism & Biculturalism
31	Pierre Elliott Trudeau	Constitutional Conference	Ottawa	February 10–12, 1969	Constitutional review
32	Pierre Elliott Trudeau	Constitutional Conference	Ottawa	June 11–12, 1969	Constitutional review
33	Pierre Elliott Trudeau	Constitutional Conference	Ottawa	December 8–10, 1969	Constitutional review
34	Pierre Elliott Trudeau	Federal–Provincial Conference	Ottawa	February 16–17, 1970	Economy, Western agriculture, pollution, Tax Structure Committee
35	Pierre Elliott Trudeau	Constitutional Conference	Ottawa	September 14–15, 1970	Constitutional review
36	Pierre Elliott Trudeau	Federal–Provincial Conference	Ottawa	September 16, 1970	Various subjects including Tax reform, agricultural, economic stabilization fund
37	Pierre Elliott Trudeau	Constitutional Conference	Ottawa	February 8–9, 1971	Constitutional review, unemployment and northern resources
38	Pierre Elliott Trudeau	Constitutional Conference	Victoria	June 14–16, 1971	Constitutional review ("Victoria Charter")
39	Pierre Elliott Trudeau	Federal–Provincial Conference	Ottawa	November 15–17, 1971	Economy, employment, fiscal arrangements, tri-level consultations
40	Pierre Elliott Trudeau	Federal–Provincial Conference	Ottawa	May 23–25, 1973	Various subjects including social security system, health programs, post-secondary education, regional economic development, economic situation, foreign land ownership
41	Pierre Elliott Trudeau	Federal–Provincial Conference of First Ministers on Energy	Ottawa	January 22–23, 1974	Various subjects including oil and gas policy, national energy policy and federal–provincial mechanisms for continuing consultation on energy
42	Pierre Elliott Trudeau	Federal–Provincial Conference of First Ministers on Energy	Ottawa	April 9–10, 1975	The state of the economy and oil and gas prices and other related items
43	Pierre Elliott Trudeau	Federal–Provincial Conference of First Ministers	Ottawa	June 14–15, 1976	Federal–provincial fiscal arrangements including shared-cost programs, revenue guarantee and equalization
44	Pierre Elliott Trudeau	Federal–Provincial Conference of First Ministers	Ottawa	December 13–14, 1976	Fiscal arrangements and state of the economy
45	Pierre Elliott Trudeau	Federal–Provincial Conference of First Ministers on the Economy	Ottawa	February 13–15, 1978	Various subjects including economic outlook and objectives, general economic policies, regional aspects of economic development, and sectoral policies
46	Pierre Elliott Trudeau	Federal–Provincial Conference of First Ministers on the Constitution	Ottawa	October 30, 31 and November 1, 1978	Charter of rights, distribution of powers, institutions, process of constitutional review (creation of the Continuing Committee of Ministers on the Constitution or "CCMC") and duplication of services
47	Pierre Elliott Trudeau	Federal–Provincial Conference of First Ministers on the Economy	Ottawa	November 27–29, 1978	Various subjects including economic overview, labour market and employment issues, and economic coordination
48	Pierre Elliott Trudeau	Federal–Provincial Conference of First Ministers on the Constitution	Ottawa	February 5–6, 1979	Various subjects including consideration of questions raised at the Constitutional Conference (October 30 – November 1, 1978) and future constitutional work program
49	Joe Clark	Federal–Provincial Conference of First Ministers on Energy	Ottawa	November 12, 1979	Oil supply, pricing and use, energy pricing and development, conservation and self-sufficiency
50	Pierre Elliott Trudeau	Federal–Provincial Conference of First Ministers on the Constitution	Ottawa	September 8–13, 1980	Various subjects including trade, communications, Upper House, Supreme Court, family law, fisheries, offshore resources, equalization, charter of rights, patriation and amending formula and powers over the economy
51	Pierre Elliott Trudeau	Federal–Provincial Conference of First Ministers on the Constitution	Ottawa	November 2–5, 1981	Consensus on patriation, constitutional amendment formula and charter of rights
52	Pierre Elliott Trudeau	Federal–Provincial Conference of First Ministers on the Economy	Ottawa	February 2–5, 1982	Economic management and development
53	Pierre Elliott Trudeau	Federal–Provincial Conference of First Ministers on Aboriginal Constitutional Matters	Ottawa	March 15–16, 1983	Various subjects including charter of rights, amending formula revisions and self-government
54	Pierre Elliott Trudeau	Federal–Provincial Conference of First Ministers on Aboriginal Constitutional Matters	Ottawa	March 8–9, 1984	Equality rights, treaties and treaty rights, land and resources and self-government
55	Brian Mulroney	First Ministers' Conference on the Economy	Regina	February 14–15, 1985	Investment, training and retraining, international trade and regional economic development ("Regina Accord" establishing "Annual Conference of First Ministers")
56	Brian Mulroney	First Ministers' Conference on Aboriginal Constitutional Matters	Ottawa	April 2–3, 1985	Aboriginal constitutional matters including self-government and sexual equality rights
57	Brian Mulroney	Annual Conference of First Ministers	Halifax	November 28–29, 1985	Federal–provincial relations, economic and fiscal situation, trade, agriculture, fisheries and economic and social development
58	Brian Mulroney	Annual Conference of First Ministers	Vancouver	November 20–21, 1986	State of the Federation and the economy, economic development and economic equality for women
59	Brian Mulroney	First Ministers' Conference on Aboriginal Constitutional Matters	Ottawa	March 26–27, 1987	Constitutional amendment on aboriginal self-government and treaties and treaty issues
60	Brian Mulroney	First Ministers' Conference on the Constitution	Ottawa	June 3, 1987	Signing of the 1987 Constitutional Accord
61	Brian Mulroney	Annual Conference of First Ministers	Toronto	November 26–27, 1987	Economic development
62	Brian Mulroney	Annual Conference of First Ministers	Ottawa	November 9–10, 1989	Federal–Provincial priorities, environment/sustainable development and Meech Lake Accord
63	Brian Mulroney	First Ministers' Conference on the Constitution	Ottawa	June 3–10, 1990	1987 Constitutional Accord (Meech Lake)
64	Brian Mulroney	First Ministers' Meeting on the Economy	Ottawa	December 19, 1991	Coordinated approach to economic recovery
65	Brian Mulroney	First Ministers' Meeting on the Economy	Ottawa	February 10, 1992	Pre-budget discussion of common economic recovery
66	Brian Mulroney	First Ministers' Meeting on the Economy	Toronto	March 24–25, 1992	Various subjects including social programs, training, infrastructure, interprovincial trade barriers, international trade, agriculture, fisheries, tax coordination
67	Brian Mulroney	First Ministers' Meeting on the Constitution	Ottawa	August 18, 1992	
68	Brian Mulroney	First Ministers' Meeting on the Constitution	Charlottetown	August 27–28, 1992	Final Consensus Report on the Constitution, Final Political Accords and Draft Legal Text based on the Charlottetown Accord
69	Jean Chrétien	First Ministers' Meeting – Economy	Ottawa	December 21, 1993	Economic renewal and fiscal responsibility, job creation and competitive economy and program coordination
70	Jean Chrétien	First Ministers' Meeting – Trade	Ottawa	July 18, 1994	Internal trade
71	Jean Chrétien	First Ministers' Meeting	Ottawa	June 20–21, 1996	Canadian economy, renewal of the federation, Section 49, Constitution Act 1982, jobs and growth and social dimensions
72	Jean Chrétien	First Ministers' Meeting	Ottawa	December 11–12, 1997	Various subjects including social policy renewal, health and youth employment
73	Jean Chrétien	First Ministers' Meeting	Ottawa	February 4, 1999	Social Union Framework Agreement
74	Jean Chrétien	First Ministers' Meeting	Ottawa	September 10–11, 2000	Health care, childhood development
75	Jean Chrétien	First Ministers' Meeting	Ottawa	February 4–5, 2003	Health care
76	Paul Martin	First Ministers' Meeting	Ottawa	January 30, 2004	Health care, public health, Canada-U.S. relations, emergency management
76–1	Paul Martin	First Ministers' Meeting	Ottawa	September 12–16, 2004	Health care - 10-year agreement on health care funding
76–2	Paul Martin	First Ministers' Meeting	Ottawa	October 26, 2004	Equalization and Territorial Formula Financing
76–3	Paul Martin	First Ministers' Meeting with National Aboriginal Leaders	Ottawa	November 24–25, 2004	Kelowna Accord - Strengthening Relationships and Closing the Gap
77	Stephen Harper	First Ministers' Meeting	Ottawa	November 10, 2008	Economy
78	Stephen Harper	First Ministers' Meeting	Ottawa	January 16, 2009	Economy
79	Justin Trudeau	First Ministers' Meeting	Ottawa	November 23, 2015	Climate change, Syrian Crisis
80	Justin Trudeau	First Ministers' Meeting	Vancouver	March 3, 2016	Climate change
81	Justin Trudeau	First Ministers' Meeting and Meeting with National Indigenous Leaders	Ottawa	December 9, 2016	Climate change framework agreement
82	Justin Trudeau	First Ministers' Meeting and Meeting with National Indigenous Leaders	Ottawa	October 3, 2017	
83	Justin Trudeau	First Ministers' Meeting and Meeting with National Indigenous Leaders	Montreal	December 7, 2018	Discussing the United States–Mexico–Canada Agreement
84	Justin Trudeau	First Ministers' Meeting	Virtual	March 13, 2020	COVID-19 pandemic
85	Justin Trudeau	First Ministers' Meeting	Virtual	December 10, 2020	COVID-19 pandemic response
86	Justin Trudeau	First Ministers' Meeting	Virtual	May 27, 2021	COVID-19 pandemic response and vaccination rollout
87	Justin Trudeau	First Ministers' Meeting	Ottawa	January 15, 2025	Incoming tariffs from the United States
88	Mark Carney	First Ministers' Meeting	Ottawa	March 21, 2025	
89	Mark Carney	First Ministers' Meeting	Virtual	April 3, 2025	Responding to the 2025 United States trade war with Canada
90	Mark Carney	First Ministers' Meeting	Virtual	May 7, 2025	
91	Mark Carney	First Ministers' Meeting	Saskatoon	June 2, 2025	One Canadian Economy Act
92	Mark Carney	First Ministers' Meeting	Virtual	August 6, 2025	
93	Mark Carney	First Ministers' Meeting	Virtual	November 17, 2025	
94	Mark Carney	First Ministers' Meeting	Virtual	December 18, 2025	
95	Mark Carney	First Ministers' Meeting	Virtual	January 29, 2026	
96	Mark Carney	First Ministers' Meeting	Charlottetown	July 23, 2026	
97	Mark Carney	First Ministers' Meeting	Virtual	August 22, 2026	Responding to the 2025 United States trade war with Canada
98	Mark Carney	First Ministers' Meeting	Ottawa	October 26, 2026	With the Assembly of First Nations

- Source Canadian intergovernmental Conference Secretariat

== See also ==
- Council of Australian Governments, Similar body in Australia
- Prime Minister and Heads of Devolved Governments Council, Similar body in the United Kingdom
- National Governors Association, Similar body in the United States of America
- Canadian Constitution
- Council of the Federation
- Politics of Canada
- Political Culture of Canada
