= Equalization payments in Germany =

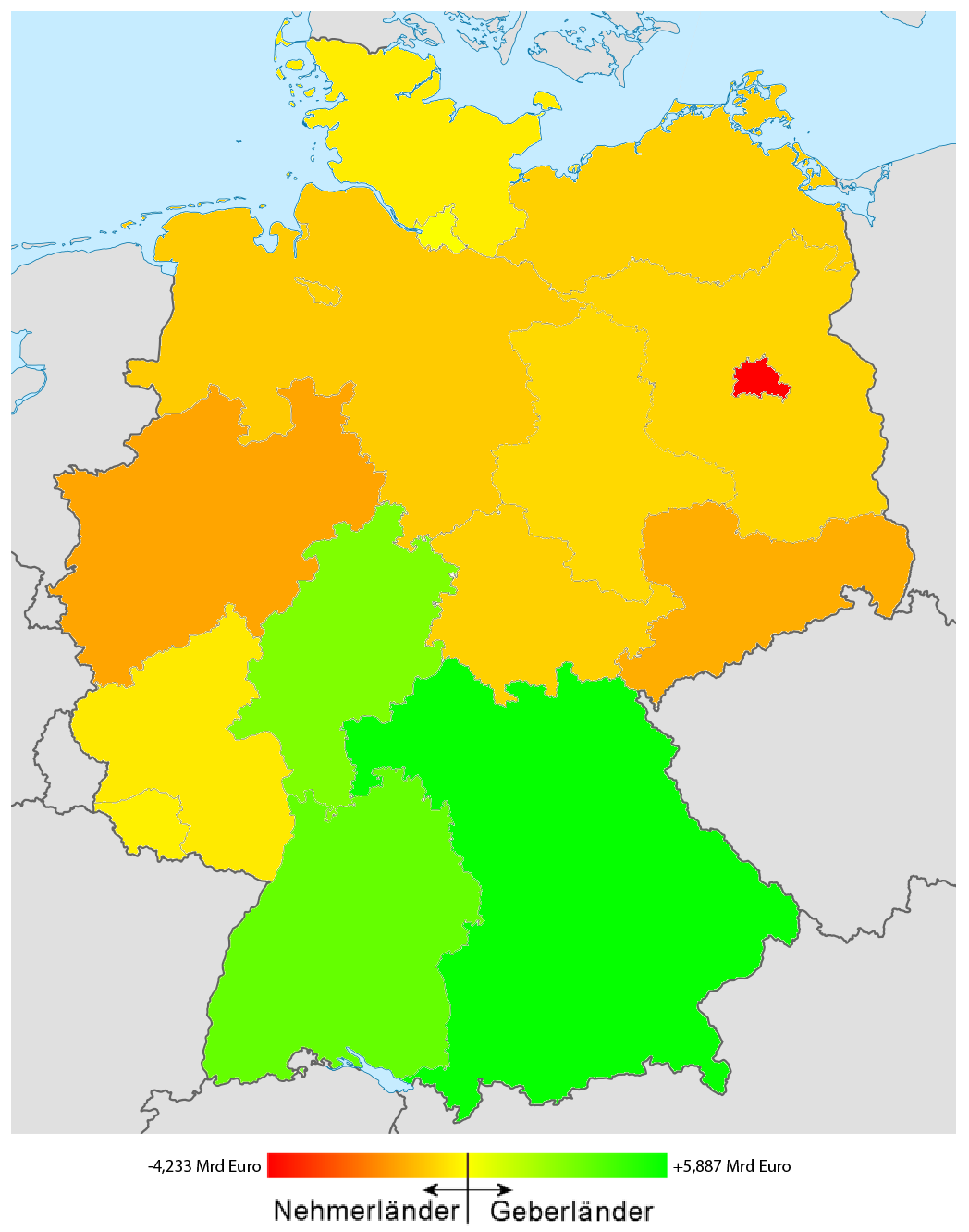
German states marked as donor states (green), recipient states (orange and red) and more or less balanced states (yellow). Data is from 2017.

Equalization payments (German: Länderfinanzausgleich, pronounced [ˈlɛndɐfiˌnant͡sʔaʊ̯sɡlaɪ̯ç], literally financial conciliation of (federal) states) are a mechanism in Germany to redistribute financial resources both between the federation and states, and between the states themselves. They were abolished in 2020 and replaced by new regulations.

== Overview ==
Equalization payments are the most commonly known system for the redistribution of revenue in Germany and are an important tool for the financing of regional development. Levels of awareness are high due to public disagreements between the states; various states have taken legal actions over the allocation of payments in the Federal Constitutional Court on many occasions including 1952, 1986, 1992, 1999 and 2006. A legal action by the states of Bavaria and Baden Würtemberg is pending in 2016. For many years the equalization payments have accounted for 2% to 3% of state income; in 2015 they amounted to €9.6bn compared to state and local tax revenues of €306bn. The aim, as laid out in the German constitution, is to balance the differing financial strengths of the federal states. In this way all states are in the position to be able to comply with the responsibilities assigned to them by the constitution. Through this process the funding requirements of the federation and states are coordinated with the aim of agreeing equalization payments, this ensures that tax payers are not overburdened and maintains consistency in the standard of living across Germany.

In order to ensure that this process guaranteed a unified budgetary policy, and to avoid the free rider problem, the federation and states budgets have been reviewed by a Stabilitätsrat or Stability Council since 2009. This council is a joint committee of the federal government and states, established to monitor budgetary management and adherence to European standards of budgetary discipline. Its establishment originated in the Federalism Reform II, a change to the constitution concerning the relationship between the federation and the states, and is regulated by the constitution. The State and Federal Finance Ministers, as well as the Federal Minister of Economics are all members of the Stability Council.

For many years the equalization payments have opened up a gap between financially strong and financially weak states that was greatly intensified by the incorporation of the new states of Germany after reunification, with their initially especially weak economic and financial power. In 2015 only four states paid into the mechanism; Bavaria €5.5bn, Baden Württemberg €2.3bn, Hesse €1.7bn and Hamburg €112m. The biggest recipient state was the capital Berlin with €3.6bn. The rural east German states between them received €3.2bn with Saxony alone receiving €1bn.

== History of the equalization payments ==
=== German Empire ===
With the establishment of the North German Confederation in 1867, revenue sharing became necessary between the newly formed group of states. In Bismark's Imperial Constitution it was determined that the states would support the empire with Member States Contributions when its own income from tolls and excise duties was not sufficient. This was often the case and the federal government became financially dependent on the states.

=== Weimar Republic ===
In the Weimar constitution the relationship was reversed; according to the Weimar constitution the central government was granted legislative power and control of income and expenditure. The regionally fragmented financial administration was consolidated into a single entity and the states became financially dependent on the federal government. They basically received a proportional allocation of tax receipts divided among the states based on regional income and population. Any remaining differences in financial strength between the states were compensated for through a supplement guarantee made by the central government in accordance with state tax law (1920), which ensured that no state received less than 80% of the average state tax income.

Finances in National Socialist Germany were also managed by a centralized state.

=== Federal Republic of Germany ===
In the consultations of the Parliamentary Council over the future constitution of the Federal Republic of Germany such financial dependency was to be avoided. The federation and the states should have equal rights and be financially independent of one another. With regard to a common economic region there was agreement on standardized taxes governed by federal law, a system of dividing tax income with the exclusive and concurrent legislative power of the federal parliament, financial administration shared between the federation and the states, and a system of equalization payments between the states. In practice a revenue sharing mechanism was introduced which was laid down in the constitution in 1955.

==== Finance Reform 1969 ====
After years of consultation a finance reform was passed in 1969 which forms the basis of the finance element of today's constitution. Article 106 of the constitution regulates the allocation of tax revenue between the federation and the states. A revenue sharing system covering income, corporation and value added tax, the three largest taxes in terms of revenue making up around three quarters of total tax revenues, was set up between the federation and the states, the allocation ratios determined by statute. The states' share of the combined taxes is pre-determined, there is an advance adjustment of value added taxes for especially weak states, and various subsequent supplementary federal grants are also available. At the same time, the whole area of mixed financing which was constitutionally questionable was given a new constitutional basis with the introduction of common responsibilities, and provisions for payment law and federal investment support. Additionally planning elements were introduced into the constitution including middle term financial planning and law relating to budgetary principles.

==== Equalization payments between the states ====
Article 107 of the constitution regulates the horizontal payments between the states. Tax revenues assigned to a state are no longer allocated based on the location in which the tax arises, but instead based on the number of residents; so income tax revenue belongs to the state in which the resident lives and corporation tax revenue belongs to the state in which the taxable economic performance arises. An exception to this rule is a state's share of value added tax revenue; up to a quarter of a state's tax revenue can be assigned to especially weak states in advance. The equalization payments are being stepped up, the states entitled to payment adjustments should now receive 95% of the average of all states' revenue compared to 91% in the past.

In hindsight the split according to place of residence disadvantages city states with their high proportion of commuters because the proportion of income tax grew especially in the first half of the 1970s due to the "cold" progression where the parameters in a progressive tax system are not adjusted for inflation and so the taxpayer pays an ever-greater proportion of income in taxes. During the 1950s income tax made up around a fifth of total tax revenue and value added tax a quarter, by 1973 income tax made up two fifths of revenue and value added tax only a sixth. Today the proportion is around a third and a quarter respectively. The residence basis provides a certain amount of compensation. The clause relating to up front value added tax adjustments, which was introduced into the constitution in 1969, gained in importance after reunification with the introduction of equalization payments for all the states in 1995. As part of the provisions of the first solidarity pact the federation allocated an extra seven percent of value added tax which flowed especially to the weaker former east German states.

Owing to various legal actions individual parts of the financial constitution have been adjusted many times, but the reforms have held true for more than 40 years and have allowed the fiscal integration of the new states after reunification.
