= Council of the Federation =

Organization of Canada's premiers

- Conseil de la fédération
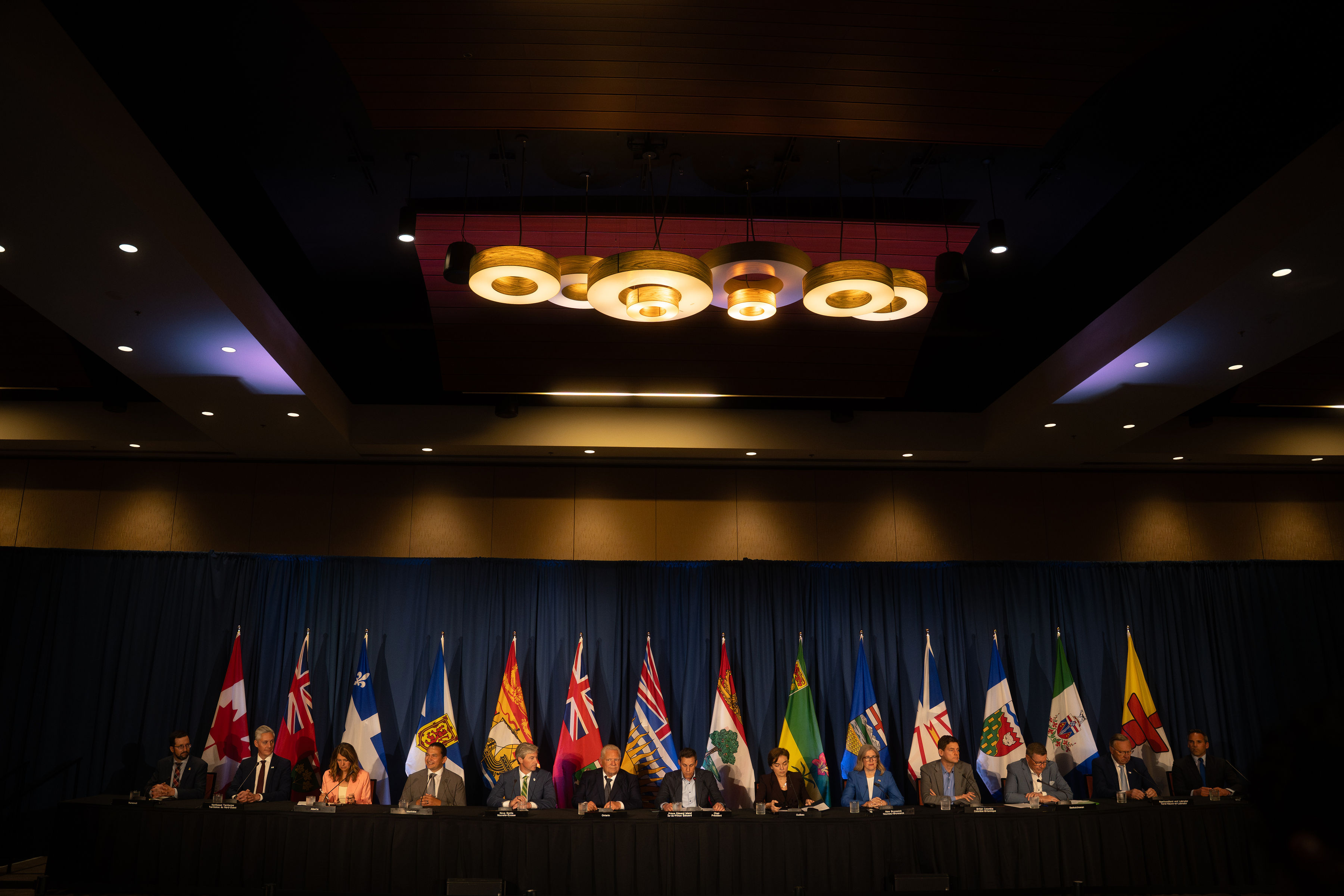
- 2026 Council Members
- Formation: 2003; 23 years ago
- Headquarters: 360 Albert Street; Ottawa, Ontario, K1R 7X7
- Chair: Rob Lantz
- Vice-Chair: R.J. Simpson
- Website: canadaspremiers.ca

The Council of the Federation (COF; French: Conseil de la fédération) is a multilateral congress composed of the premiers of each of Canada's 13 provinces and territories, which meets at least twice annually.

Its main function is to promote interprovincial-territorial cooperation, collaborate on shared governmental priorities, and ultimately provide a united front amongst the provincial and territorial governments when interacting with Canada's federal government. It also promotes "constructive Confederation", working for Canadian unity, and recognizing differences amongst the various provinces and territories within Canada's federal system of government.

The council meets at least twice a year, with an annual summer conference held in the jurisdiction of the Chair, which rotates annually between premiers; and at least one other meeting at a location determined by the Council. The Council also meets via teleconference periodically throughout the year.

== History ==
The idea for a body akin to the Council of the Federation had long been present, but suggestions did not come to fruition until after Quebec premier Jean Charest raised the concept again during preparation for negotiations with the federal government. The idea was for the first time embraced by all the premiers and the council was formed, its foundation being announced on December 5, 2003, in Charlottetown, Prince Edward Island. This location was significant because Charlottetown was, in 1864, the venue for the Charlottetown Conference (the first step towards Canadian Confederation).

The first test of the council's united front occurred between September 13 and 16, 2004, when the premiers met with Prime Minister Paul Martin to discuss reforms to Canada's universal healthcare program. The premiers remained united and in the end won $41 billion of federal funding for healthcare over the next ten years.

The 2008 meetings of the council took place in Quebec City, which was celebrating its 400th anniversary as a settlement. At the meeting all premiers agreed to amendments to the Agreement on Internal Trade to create greater labour mobility between the provinces and territories, which came into force on January 1, 2009.

The 2009 meetings of the council took place in Regina, Saskatchewan. The agenda was dominated by economic matters including trade issues with the United States and formulating a post-recession interprovincial economic strategy.

On February 20, 2010, the council met with their American counterpart, the National Governors Association, in Washington, D.C., for an hour-long session entitled "Common Border, Common Ground" to talk about issues such as environment and trade. Also attending this meeting were Lisa P. Jackson, of the United States Environmental Protection Agency (EPA), and Larry Summers, U.S. president Barack Obama's economic advisor. The Canadian premiers commented on how much more open the Obama administration was to confronting and solving problems, compared to his predecessor, George W. Bush.

=== Chairs of the Council of the Federation ===
Chair	Province/territory	Term start	Term end	Party
Rob Lantz	Prince Edward Island	February 9, 2026		Progressive Conservative
Bloyce Thompson	Prince Edward Island	December 12, 2025	February 9, 2026	Progressive Conservative
Rob Lantz	Prince Edward Island	July 23, 2025	December 12, 2025	Progressive Conservative
Doug Ford	Ontario	August 1, 2024	July 23, 2025	Progressive Conservative
Tim Houston	Nova Scotia	July 12, 2023	August 1, 2024	Progressive Conservative
Heather Stefanson	Manitoba	September 27, 2022	July 12, 2023	Progressive Conservative
John Horgan	British Columbia	September 16, 2021	September 27, 2022	New Democratic

== Issues ==
- Healthcare funding and innovation
- Economic development (especially in the wake of the Bovine spongiform encephalopathy crisis)
- Strengthening Confederation (working for provincial input into the selection of senators and Supreme Court justices)
- Reaching out to young Canadians, getting them involved in the political process
- Helping those affected by emergencies
- Inter-provincial/territorial trade
- Water

== Members ==
First minister	Jurisdiction	Party	Notes
Provinces – Provincial premiers
Doug Ford	Ontario	Progressive Conservative	
Paul St-Pierre Plamondon	Quebec	Parti Québécois	
Tim Houston	Nova Scotia	Progressive Conservative	
Susan Holt	New Brunswick	Liberal	
Wab Kinew	Manitoba	New Democratic	
Lorne Doerkson	British Columbia	Conservative	
Rob Lantz	Prince Edward Island	Progressive Conservative	Current chair
Scott Moe	Saskatchewan	Saskatchewan	
Danielle Smith	Alberta	United Conservative	
Tony Wakeham	Newfoundland and Labrador	Progressive Conservative	
Territories – Territorial premiers
R.J. Simpson	Northwest Territories	N/A (consensus government)	Current vice-chair
Currie Dixon	Yukon	Yukon Party	
John Main	Nunavut	N/A (consensus government)	

== See also ==
- First Ministers' conference
- Politics of Canada
- Political culture of Canada
- National Cabinet, a similar body in Australia
- National Governors Association
