= Section 121 of the Constitution Act, 1867 =

Provision of the Canadian Constitution

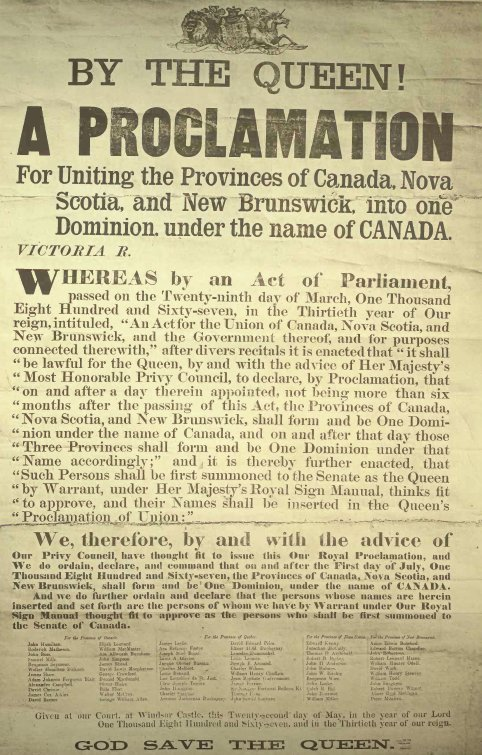
Proclamation bringing the Constitution Act into force, July 1, 1867

Section 121 of the Constitution Act, 1867 (French: article 121 de la Loi constitutionnelle de 1867) is a provision of the Constitution of Canada relating to the entry of goods from one province into another.

The Constitution Act, 1867 is the constitutional statute which established Canada. Originally named the British North America Act, 1867, the Act continues to be the foundational statute for the Constitution of Canada, although it has been amended many times since 1867. It is now recognised as part of the supreme law of Canada.

== Constitution Act, 1867 ==
The Constitution Act, 1867 is part of the Constitution of Canada and thus part of the supreme law of Canada. It was the product of extensive negotiations by the governments of the British North American provinces in the 1860s. The Act sets out the constitutional framework of Canada, including the structure of the federal government and the powers of the federal government and the provinces. Originally enacted in 1867 by the British Parliament under the name the British North America Act, 1867, in 1982 the Act was brought under full Canadian control through the Patriation of the Constitution, and was renamed the Constitution Act, 1867. Since Patriation, the Act can only be amended in Canada, under the amending formula set out in the Constitution Act, 1982.

== Text of section 121 ==
Section 121 of the Constitution Act, 1867 provides that:

Canadian Manufactures, etc.

121. All Articles of the Growth, Produce, or Manufacture of any one of the Provinces shall, from and after the Union, be admitted free into each of the other Provinces.

Section 121 is found in Part VIII of the Constitution Act, 1867, dealing with revenues, debts, assets, and taxation. It has not been amended since the Act was enacted in 1867.

== Background ==
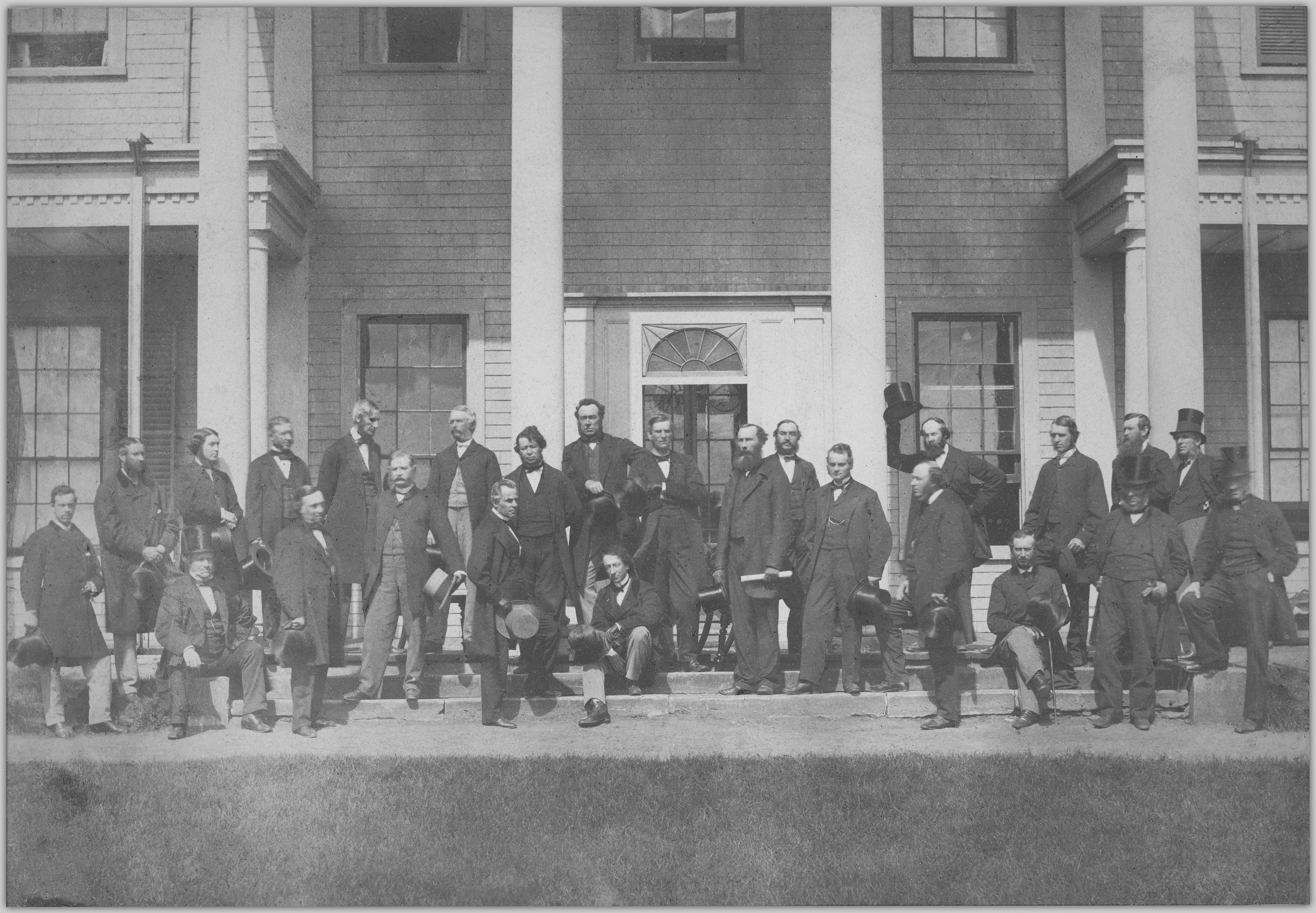
Delegates of the Charlottetown Conference on the steps of Government House, September 1864.

Prior to Canadian Confederation, duty-free status had already been accorded by New Brunswick, Nova Scotia and Canada to one another, each contingent on the other colonies' granting such status. There was also free trade between the colonies of British North America and the United States of America under the 1854 Reciprocity Treaty, but the United States had served notice in December 1864 that it wished to seek changes to the Treaty, including "modify[ing] the rights of transit [of goods] from Canada through the United States." As goods from Canada were previously allowed to pass through the US in bond to ports in New Brunswick and Nova Scotia for transshipment to Britain, this represented a potentially significant non-tariff barrier that was on the minds of participants during the 1865–1867 intercolonial conferences that took place in Charlottetown, Quebec and London that led to the creation of Canada in 1867.

Although the proceedings of the various conferences were not recorded, George Brown said later that union of all Provinces would "break down all trade barriers between us," and throw open all at once "a combined market of four millions of people." Alexander Galt said that the purpose of the Union was "free trade among ourselves." In February 1865, in a debate in the Legislative Assembly of the Province of Canada, John A. Macdonald declared that Canada wanted "to establish a commercial union, with unrestricted free trade, between people of the five provinces."

The actual provision did not appear until the final draft of the British North America bill in February 1867, where it was worded thus:

125. All Articles the Growth or Produce or Manufacture of Ontario, Quebec, Nova Scotia, or New Brunswick, shall be admitted free into all Ports in Canada.

It was subsequently revised in March 1867 into its final form:

121. All Articles of the Growth, Produce, or Manufacture of any one of the Provinces shall, from and after the Union, be admitted free into each of the other Provinces.

As such, it was duly passed as part of the Constitution Act, 1867.

== Canadian jurisprudence ==
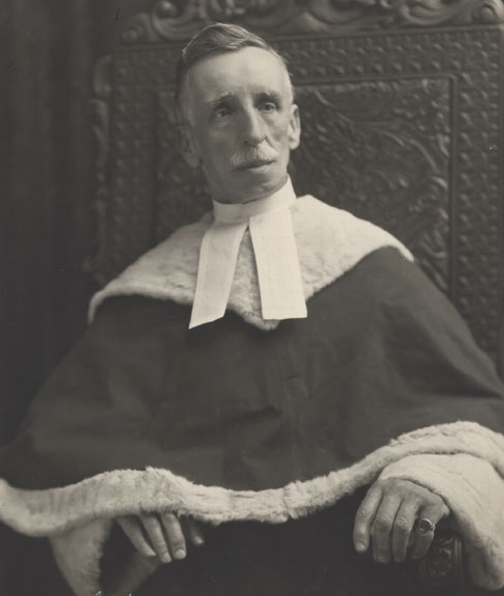
Justice Pierre-Basile Mignault

Although s. 91(2) cases have stated that the provinces cannot enact laws that inhibit the free flow of goods across provincial borders, such laws that have only incidental effects may still be constitutional. There is no general rule that prevents the Parliament of Canada from enacting such legislation.

Since 1921, the governing interpretation of s. 121 has come from Gold Seal Ltd. v. Alberta (Attorney-General), which considers that it only bars the levying of customs duties on goods moving between provinces. This interpretation has been sustained in subsequent cases.

As noted by Mignault J.:

I think that, like the enactment I have just quoted, the object of section 121 was not to decree that all articles of the growth, produce or manufacture of any of the provinces should be admitted into the others, but merely to secure that they should be admitted "free," that is to say without any tax or duty imposed as a condition of their admission. The essential word here is "free" and what is prohibited is the levying of custom duties or other charges of a like nature in matters of interprovincial trade.

In Lawson v. Interior Tree Fruit and Vegetables Committee of Direction, which involved a British Columbia law requiring agricultural producers to pay a levy in order to allow shipment of their produce anywhere in Canada, Cannon J. in his concurring judgment expanded on this, stating:

I, therefore, reach the conclusion that this legislation is an attempt to impose by indirect taxation and regulations an obstacle to one of the main purposes of Confederation, which was, ultimately, to form an economic unit of all the provinces in British North America with absolute freedom of trade between its constituent parts.

In Murphy v. C.P.R., Rand J., in a concurring judgment, attempted to present an alternative interpretation:

I take s. 121, apart from customs duties, to be aimed against trade regulation which is designed to place fetters upon or raise impediments to or otherwise restrict or limit the free flow of commerce across the Dominion as if provincial boundaries did not exist. That it does not create a level of trade activity divested of all regulation I have no doubt; what is preserved is a free flow of trade regulated in subsidiary features which are or have come to be looked upon as incidents of trade. What is forbidden is a trade regulation that in its essence and purpose is related to a provincial boundary.

Rand J.'s comment was referred to, and adopted by, Laskin C.J. in Reference re Agricultural Products Marketing, where he said:

Accepting this view of s. 121, I find nothing in the marketing scheme here that, as a trade regulation, is in its essence and purpose related to a provincial boundary. To hold otherwise would mean that a federal marketing statute, referable to interprovincial trade, could not validly take into account patterns of production in the various Provinces in attempting to establish an equitable basis for the flow of trade. I find here no design of punitive regulation directed against or in favour of any Province.

== Proliferation of internal barriers ==
Because of the above, Gold Seal still governs the question of the movement of goods in Canada, although there is still debate as to whether the original case was rightly decided. Although customs duties and similar charges are prohibited on this activity, non-tariff barriers can still be instituted by both levels of government, such as:

- differing standards for vehicle brakes for adjoining provinces
- requiring that margarine have a specific colour for sale in Quebec (although that has since been repealed)
- requiring that butter sold in Quebec be wrapped in foil
- hay from Alberta cannot be trucked to B.C. unless it is unloaded and repacked to B.C. shipping standards

In addition, federal legislation in the following areas has been held to be valid:

- mandatory sale requirements under the Canadian Wheat Board Act (although that has since been repealed)
- prohibition of interprovincial shipments under the Importation of Intoxicating Liquors Act
- imposition of provincial quotas and price-fixing arrangements under various agricultural marketing schemes

As a result, there are probably greater obstacles to trade between the provinces than there are to trade between Canada and the rest of the world, and it may explain why Canada has lower productivity than the United States.

== Is Gold Seal still good law? ==
There has been debate as to whether Gold Seal would continue to hold under the current Canadian practice for constitutional analysis, most notably in the following areas:

- the Lawson observation that Canada should be viewed as a single economic unit, which has been affirmed in other areas of jurisprudence since Morguard Investments Ltd. v. De Savoye
- since 1930, the living tree doctrine requires that a constitutional provision must receive a "large and liberal interpretation" according to its terms
- since 1982, provisions in the Constitution require a "purposive" or "purposeful" interpretation, showing that one must first consider the wording of the Act, then the legislative history, the scheme of the Act, and the legislative context

It is therefore argued that, under a purposive interpretation such as Rand J. had proposed, s. 121 requires any federal or provincial statute to meet three requirements:

- It may not levy provincial customs duties and charges or impose any trade regulation that places fetters on, raises impediments to or limits the free flow of Canadian goods across Canada as if provincial boundaries did not exist
- It may regulate a free flow of Canadian goods in subsidiary features, in the incidents of trade
- It may not impose a trade regulation on the movement of Canadian goods that in its essence and purpose is related to a provincial boundary

This proposition has not yet been tested, but it has been suggested that the Importation of Intoxicating Liquors Act could be found to be unconstitutional as a result.

=== Current developments ===
In 2015, a test case concerning the validity of certain portions of New Brunswick's Liquor Control Act started trial in Campbellton, New Brunswick. The defence included a constitutional challenge based on s. 121 which was supported by the Canadian Constitution Foundation. In April 2016, the trial judge invalidated the provisions, declaring, "That historical context leads to only one conclusion: The Fathers of Confederation wanted to implement free trade as between the provinces of the newly formed Canada." The Office of the Attorney General sought leave to appeal the decision directly to the New Brunswick Court of Appeal, which dismissed the application in October 2016. Leave to appeal was granted by the Supreme Court of Canada on May 4, 2017, When the application for leave was sought, it was welcomed by some commentators as "put[ting] an overdue issue to rest."

The trial court judge was eventually overturned by the Supreme Court of Canada in R v Comeau, in which it stated that "[w]hile one effect of s. 134(b) is to impede interprovincial trade, this effect is only incidental in light of the objective of the provincial scheme in general. Therefore, while s. 134(b) in essence impedes cross‑border trade, this is not its primary purpose. Section 134(b) does not infringe s. 121 of the Constitution Act, 1867".

== See also ==
- Dormant commerce clause of the United States Constitution
- Section 92 of the Constitution of Australia

== Sources ==
- Blue, Ian (2009). "On the Rocks? Section 121 of the Constitution Act, 1867 and the Constitutionality of the Importation of Intoxicating Liquors Act" (PDF). The Advocates' Quarterly. 35 (3). Canada Law Book Inc: 306–333.
- Blue, Ian A. (2010). "Long Overdue: A Reappraisal of Section 121 of the Constitution Act, 1867". Dalhousie Law Journal. 33 (2). Schulich School of Law, Dalhousie University: 161–191.
- Crowley, Brian Lee; Knox, Robert; Robson, John (2010). "Citizen of One, Citizen of the Whole: How Ottawa can strengthen our nation by eliminating provincial trade barriers with a charter of economic rights" (PDF). Macdonald-Laurier Institute.
- Palda, Filip (1994). "Preface: Why Canada Must Rid Itself of Interprovincial Trade Barriers". In Filip Palda (ed.). Provincial trade wars: Why the blockade must end. Vancouver: Fraser Institute. pp. xi–xxiv. ISBN 0-88975-166-8.
