= Agreement on Internal Trade =

1995 Canadian intergovernmental agreement

- Type: Intergovernmental trade agreement
- Context: Internal trade in Canada
- Location: Winnipeg, Manitoba, Canada
- Effective: 1 July 1995
- Condition: Ratification by federal government, provinces, and territories
- Replaced by: Canadian Free Trade Agreement
- Expiry: 1 July 2017
- Parties: Government of Canada; Governments of the 10 provinces; Governments of Yukon and Northwest Territories (later extended to Nunavut)
- Depositary: Internal Trade Secretariat
- Language: English and French

The Agreement on Internal Trade (AIT) was an intergovernmental agreement among the federal government, the provinces, and the territories that entered into force on 1 July 1995 to reduce barriers to the movement of goods, services, investment, and labour within Canada. It was superseded by the Canadian Free Trade Agreement, which came into force on 1 July 2017.

It was an intergovernmental agreement between the federal government and the provinces and territories to reduce and eliminate barriers to free movement of people, goods, services and investments within Canada. Under the Agreement, these governments have agreed to apply the principles of non-discrimination, transparency, openness and accessibility with respect to their procurement opportunities and those of their municipalities and municipal organizations, school boards and publicly funded academic, health and social services entities. The Agreement covers only those tenders where the procurement value exceeds a specified amount.

== See also ==
- Canadian Free Trade Agreement
- Canada Minister for Internal Trade
- New West Partnership
- Single market
- Internal Market (European Union)
