= R v Comeau =

Canadian legal case

- Supreme Court of Canada

Hearing: 6–7 December 2017 Judgment: 19 April 2018
- Full case name: Her Majesty the Queen v Gerard Comeau
- Citations: 2018 SCC 15
- Docket No.: 37398
- Prior history: APPEAL from R v Comeau, 2016 CanLII 73665 (20 October 2016), dismissing an application for leave to appeal from R v Comeau, 2016 NBPC 3 (29 April 2016). Leave to appeal granted, Her Majesty the Queen v Gerard Comeau, 2017 CanLII 25783 (4 May 2017)
- Ruling: Appeal allowed

Holding
- S. 121 prohibits laws that in essence and purpose impede the passage of goods across provincial borders and it does not prohibit laws that yield only incidental effects on interprovincial trade.

Court membership
- Chief Justice: Beverley McLachlin; Puisne Justices: Rosalie Abella, Michael Moldaver, Andromache Karakatsanis, Richard Wagner, Clément Gascon, Suzanne Côté, Russell Brown, Malcolm Rowe

Reasons given
- Unanimous reasons by: The Court

Laws applied
- Constitution Act, 1867, s. 121

R v Comeau, 2018 SCC 15 (referred to by some commentators as the Free the beer case) is a leading and controversial case of the Supreme Court of Canada concerning the scope of free trade between the provinces of Canada under s. 121 of the Constitution Act, 1867.

== Background ==
While s. 121 of the Constitution Act, 1867 declares that "All Articles of the Growth, Produce, or Manufacture of any one of the Provinces shall... be admitted free into each of the other Provinces," Canadian jurisprudence has rarely been given in the matter and, since the Gold Seal case in 1921 held that it was strictly restricted to the imposition of customs duties, the provision had been effectively been treated as a dead letter law. This has led to both levels of government feeling free to impose a series of non-tariff barriers on trade between the provinces.

There has, however, been subsequent debate as to whether Gold Seal was rightly decided (Note: including an accusation of vote rigging by then Minister of Justice Charles Doherty concerning Anglin J and Migneault J (based on an unsigned letter written in 1924 by Duff J (as he then was) to Lord Haldane, found in Duff's personal papers)) and whether it would pass scrutiny under current Canadian constitutional law jurisprudence.

== Facts of the case ==
In 2012, Gérard Comeau travelled from his home in Tracadie, New Brunswick to Pointe-à-la-Croix, Quebec to buy some beer at a store on the Listuguj Mi'gmaq First Nation priced cheaper than what he could obtain in his home province. He was caught in a sting operation and handed a ticket of almost $300 for possessing liquor not purchased from the New Brunswick Liquor Corporation, in violation of that province's Liquor Control Act.

In 2015, Comeau contested the ticket in a trial in Campbellton, New Brunswick. His defence, supported by the Canadian Constitution Foundation, included a constitutional challenge based on s. 121.

== The courts below ==
In April 2016, the trial judge invalidated the provisions, declaring, "That historical context leads to only one conclusion: The Fathers of Confederation wanted to implement free trade as between the provinces of the newly formed Canada." Upon learning of his victory, Comeau said:

The way I look at it, I'm a Canadian citizen. I don't see any reason why I can't go buy merchandise anywhere in this country and bring it home. You can buy anything else like cars, clothes, everything. Except for beer.

The local Crown Attorney sought leave to appeal the decision directly to the New Brunswick Court of Appeal, (Note: an accelerated procedure available in New Brunswick on a question of law only, under the Provincial Offences Procedure Act, S.N.B. 1987, c. P-22.1, s. 116(3)) which summarily dismissed the application in October 2016. Leave to appeal was granted by the Supreme Court of Canada in May 2017, for which the hearing was held in December 2017. When the application for leave was sought, it was welcomed by some commentators as "put[ting] an overdue issue to rest."

=== Hearing at the Supreme Court ===
“The implications of these competing interpretations of s. 121 of the Constitution Act, 1867 are significant. If Mr. Comeau’s broad interpretation of s. 121 is correct, federal and provincial legislative schemes of many types — environmental, health, commercial, social — may be invalid. If a narrower interpretation is correct, the legal force of s. 121 is circumscribed to tariffs, or their functional equivalents.”

SCC, par. 51

In addition to Comeau and the Attorney General of New Brunswick, 24 interveners were also heard, (Note: Almost all other Attorneys General, many associations of producers of agricultural products and alcoholic beverages, FedEx Canada and others) thus calling for a rare two-day hearing at the Court. In a joint submission, agricultural producers argued that upholding the decision would threaten the Canadian supply management system. While New Brunswick asserted that it sought to maintain its right to generate liquor revenues, other provinces were more equivocal on the issue. There was very little common ground among the parties as to what type of test should be applied with respect to the scope of s. 121:

- New Brunswick argued that Gold Seal should not be discarded, but rather reinterpreted to hold that laws that directly discriminate against interprovincial trade would only be enforceable if they were necessary to meet a "significant, non-protectionist objective."
- Many argued in favour of an "essence and purpose test" similar to what had been proposed by Rand J in 1958, where he believed that s. 121 prohibited any trade barrier (tariff or non-tariff) which restricted or limited "the free flow of commerce across the Dominion."
- The Consumers Council of Canada proposed that any law relying on location, either directly or by proxy, to discriminate against interprovincial trade would be presumptively invalid, but such presumption could be overruled if the law was proportionate and was necessary to achieve a non-protectionist objective.
- The Canadian Chamber of Commerce argued for a "proportionality test", where consideration would be given to whether a legitimate public interest could be achieved by a measure with lesser impact on interprovincial trade.
- Canada's National Brewers argued for a two-step "discrimination test", incorporating elements of the United States Supreme Court's ruling in Granholm v. Heald together with an analysis similar to what the Oakes test employs in Charter jurisprudence.
- Comeau countered these arguments, by asserting that such middle ground positions would only serve to maintain the status quo, and that "any restriction on the free flow of Canadian goods" related to provincial boundaries is prohibited under s. 121.

== The SCC decision ==
“The federalism principle militates against such an interpretation — the aim is balance and capacity, not imbalance and constitutional gaps. The federal government and provincial governments should be able to legislate in ways that impose incidental burdens on the passage of goods between provinces, in light of the scheme of the Constitution Act, 1867 as a whole, and in particular the division of powers... This is illustrated by Gold Seal. If the federal government had not been able to enact its law prohibiting liquor from crossing the borders of the dry provinces, there would have been a legislative hiatus, and the cooperative scheme aimed at allowing these provinces to keep liquor out would not have been possible.”

SCC, par. 99

“Reading s. 121 to require full economic integration would significantly undermine the shape of Canadian federalism, which is built upon regional diversity within a single nation... A key facet of this regional diversity is that the Canadian federation provides space to each province to regulate the economy in a manner that reflects local concerns.”

SCC, par. 85

The appeal was allowed. In a per curiam ruling, the Court held that the judge at first instance erred in departing from previous decisions of the Court. Subject to the extraordinary exceptions noted in Bedford and Carter, stare decisis requires a lower court to apply the decisions of higher courts to the facts before it, and the exceptions did not apply in this case. The historical evidence admitted at trial was also insufficient in this regard.

The Court accepted the invitation to provide guidance as to how to apply s. 121 in future jurisprudence:

- s. 121 does not impose absolute free trade across Canada. It prohibits governments from levying tariffs or tariff-like measures (measures that in essence and purpose burden the passage of goods across a provincial border); but it does not prohibit governments from adopting laws and regulatory schemes directed to other goals that have incidental effects on the passage of goods across provincial borders. The historical evidence, at best, provides only limited support for the view that "admitted free" in s. 121 was meant as an absolute guarantee of trade free of all barriers.
- The legislative context of s. 121 indicates that it was part of a scheme that enabled the shifting of customs, excise, and similar levies from the former colonies to the Dominion; that it should be interpreted as applying to measures that increase the price of goods when they cross a provincial border; and that it should not be read so expansively that it would impinge on legislative powers under ss. 91 and 92 of the Constitution Act, 1867.
- It is not spent in its nature, as its wording shows that it was neither transitional nor time-limited.
- It must be interpreted according to the federalism principle that has been devised in Canadian constitutional jurisprudence. Neither Comeau's submission favouring full economic integration, nor the Crown's submission favouring governments expansive scope to impose barriers on goods crossing their borders, can be accepted in interpreting this principle. In that regard, (1) the purpose of s. 121 is to prohibit laws that in essence and purpose restrict or limit the free flow of goods across the country, and (2) laws that pose only incidental effects on trade as part of broader regulatory schemes not aimed at impeding trade do not have the purpose of restricting interprovincial trade and hence do not violate s. 121.
- A party alleging that a law violates s. 121 must establish that the law in essence and purpose restricts trade across a provincial border. It must be shown that (1) it must impact the interprovincial movement of goods like a tariff, which, in the extreme, could be an outright prohibition, and (2) restriction of cross-border trade must be the primary purpose of the law, thereby excluding laws enacted for other purposes, such as laws that form rational parts of broader legislative schemes with purposes unrelated to impeding interprovincial trade.

In the immediate case, the objective of the New Brunswick scheme was held not to restrict trade across a provincial boundary, but to enable public supervision of the production, movement, sale, and use of alcohol within New Brunswick. Therefore, s. 134(b) of the Liquor Control Act does not violate s. 121.

== Impact and aftermath ==
“The Fathers of Confederation knew this when they drafted a Constitution to unite the formerly-rival colonies within a single, free-trading economy in which the goods of one province would be 'admitted free' into all the others. Apparently their only mistake was not adding the postscript: 'and we mean it.'”

— Howard Anglin, Canadian Constitutional Foundation

“The court is surely right to say the provision could not have been meant to apply to any and all provincial laws that have any impact on trade, no matter how trivial the infringement or how vital the legislation’s purpose. But a common-sense reading of the text would also suggest the bias was intended to be in favour of openness.

So when the court distinguishes between laws whose 'essence and purpose' is to restrict trade between the provinces, and those where that is only the 'incidental effect,' it is not far off. It is everything that comes after that’s the trouble.”

— Andrew Coyne

“Just because you have the power to do something doesn’t mean you should do it. A policy that is short-sighted and counter-productive doesn’t become any wiser just because it’s constitutional.”

— Editorial Board, Toronto Star

=== Legal commentary ===
Legal and constitutional commentary was mixed. Some lawyers welcomed the Court's statements describing the federalism principle as being neutral, the current nature of stare decisis, and the use of an "essence and purpose test" in determining whether a federal or provincial measure impedes interprovincial trade. Bedford, Carter and Comeau can also be read together to suggest that "(1) lower courts must follow higher courts’ decisions, despite evidence that those decisions should have come out differently; and (2) courts should refrain from overruling themselves, even in matters of constitutional interpretation, where overturning long-entrenched precedent would be broadly disruptive."

While not discussed in the ruling, it was suggested that the federal government can exercise its trade and commerce power to lower interprovincial trade barriers. That has been disputed, as Comeau can be construed as restricting the federal power, thus opening a Pandora's box in enabling the provinces to create an "oxymoronic economic union by using some high-sounding, overriding public-policy objective."

Other commentators were more critical in their assessment of Comeau:

- The Court's attempt to distinguish its treatment of stare decisis was viewed as an arbitrary decision, in part to grapple with the genie in the bottle it had released in Bedford and Carter. While the trial judge may have overreached in accepting historical evidence as to the interpretation of s. 121 (and thus breaching the Court's ruling in R v Mohan), "there is no principled basis to allow lower courts to overturn the decisions of higher courts where the trier of fact determines that the 'social and factual landscape' has changed, but not where the impugned decision is demonstrated to be incorrect."
- The approach taken as to statutory interpretation was also viewed to be questionable, as there was no attempt to conduct a detailed textual analysis, there was a failure to interpret what the phrase "admitted free" was intended to mean, and the interpretation eventually employed leads to the absurd conclusion that the Fathers of Confederation "consciously included a provision that they intended to have no substantive meaning."
- The "exhaustiveness doctrine" (devised by the Court in Reference Re Same-Sex Marriage) was misapplied in this case, in holding that "s. 121 must be interpreted in a way that does not deprive Parliament and provincial legislatures of the powers granted to them to deal effectively with problems that arise." Same-Sex Marriage actually held that "there is no topic that cannot be legislated upon, though the particulars of such legislation may be limited by, for instance, the Charter."
- The Court's pro-regulatory bias (noted at par. 3 and 51) affected its analysis of the nature of federalism, and "doing so is all the easier if historical evidence can be treated as less significant and worthy of deference than equivalent social scientific evidence, twisted, or even ignored."
- The approach to identifying and interpreting the issues raised in Comeau was also questioned. While Canadian constitutional jurisprudence can generally be classified as issues of (1) interpreting the heads of power assigned to each of the levels of government; (2) the drawing of boundaries between such powers; and (3) the general implications arising from applying the recently devised doctrine of cooperative federalism, the Court mistakenly analyzed Comeau under the third category, where it should have more properly done so under the first.

=== Popular reaction ===
The decision was immediately attacked as being logically inconsistent and a "basket of contradictions", and upholding "the strange and growth-defying ability of provinces to restrict inter-provincial trade." One editorial stated, "The Supreme Court's decision this week in the 'Free the Beer' case could drive you to drink. Not that you'll have many beverage options to choose from. At least not Canadian ones."

The Court was described as one "that appears far more concerned with what it considers to be good social and economic policy than with the text of the Constitution." In addition, Comeau was considered to be "legally wrong, historically flawed, metaphysically rotten and destructive," and "post-truth jurisprudence." While the case was focused on the crossborder transport of liquor, a professor at the University of Ottawa observed that "The elephant in the room seems to be all the other regulations that are going on in the background," thus pressuring the Court to be cautious. It was also suggested that the language of the ruling relating to s. 121's ability to bar punitive barriers was written with the controversy surrounding the Trans Mountain pipeline expansion on their minds.

A commentator exclaimed, "What is the worst part of the Supreme Court's decision in R v Comeau? Is it the shoddy reasoning, the tendentious reading of simple declarative statements, the selective approach to history, the willful naïveté?" Another said that the Court was being "pathologically timid while somehow simultaneously rendering an unpopular decision," and its assertion that the New Brunswick law had only an incidental effect on interprovincial trade was "like arguing that a rule removing one of the team's nets has only an incidental effect on a hockey game." It was noted that "Comeau countenances even restriction on inter-provincial trade that would previously have been thought flatly unconstitutional. In the process, it tramples over constitutional text and history, as well as logic."

Opinions were also expressed that New Brunswick's liquor monopoly represented "raw trade protectionism", where "there is no provincial trade barrier that cannot be dressed up in the clothes of a broader provincial program," and that "[t]he system is too entrenched, with too many interests in every province hard at work keeping their corner of the country safe from competition." A Fellow of the C.D. Howe Institute noted that the "primary purpose" test devised by the Court essentially reverses the onus of proving that a practice is discriminatory, in contrast to what the World Trade Organization and the General Agreement on Tariffs and Trade use in their proceedings to determine such matters on an international scale.
