= Executive federalism =

President & provincial leader relations

Executive federalism is "the processes of intergovernmental negotiation that are dominated by the executives of the different governments within the federal system." Alternatively, Donald Smiley defined executive federalism as "the relation between elected and appointed officials of the two orders of government."

== Implementation by country ==
=== Australia ===
During the COVID-19 pandemic in Australia, the National Cabinet was formed, consisting of the Prime Minister and the premiers and chief ministers of the Australian states and territories, in order to help guide the country through the crisis. It has been described as akin to Australia's war cabinet during the Second World War. As a special intergovernmental decision-making forum, its power is that which the leaders of all Australian jurisdictions bring to negotiate on behalf of their people, and to implement the decisions reached, a model which public policy expert Jennifer Menzies calls executive federalism. In this model, the citizens of each state or territory are represented by their elected heads, and the smaller states have equal representation

=== Austria ===
The Conference of State Governors (German: Landeshauptleutekonferenz) is an informal – not provided for in the Constitution of Austria – meeting of the nine state governors. Alongside the Federal Council, the Austrian upper house, it is the second most important body for co-operation between the states as well as for federalism in the Austrian political system (in the modern Austria). The Council of state governors is considered to be "the most powerful governing institution of the federal states" and a motor for strengthening the federal state", the Federal Council itself is regarded as having little influence in Austria. Its importance is also reflected in the fact that although it has no constitutional basis, numerous legal texts refer to it.

=== Brazil ===
The National Forum of Governors is the main in which the governors of the various Brazilian states make representations to the federal government.

=== Belgium ===
The Consultative Committee is an organ in which representatives of the various Belgian governments sit to consult and prevent or settle conflicts.

Due to the state reform, Belgium currently has 6 governments. In order to maintain some coherence in policy, it was necessary to create a body in which the various governments can meet regularly and consult. The Consultative Committee was set up for the purpose.

In the composition of this committee, a double parity is used: there are as many Flemish-speaking as French-speaking people and as many members of the federal government as of the governments of the communities and regions of Belgium.

=== Canada ===
In Canada, the most publicized aspect of executive federalism is the First Ministers Conference; however, in the first decade of the 21st century, the Council of the Federation became the important bi-annual meeting between the Premiers of Canada. Notable efforts at the Council of the Federation include the attempt by former Premier of Ontario, Mike Harris, to promote the idea that the provinces should take primary responsibility to set the national standards in social policy and Premier of Alberta, Ralph Klein, calling on other premiers to join him in opposing Ottawa's signing of the Kyoto Protocol.

=== Germany ===
The Conference of Ministers-President is a committee formed by the sixteen States of Germany (Bundesländer) to coordinate policy in areas that fall within the sole jurisdiction of the Länder, e.g. broadcasting. The conference is not a constitutional body, therefore formal agreements between the federal states are fixed in a Staatsvertrag (treaty/compact). Since the MPK itself is not an official constitutional body, its meetings are purely informal, coordinating in nature. Similar bodies also exist at the level of the specialist ministers (such as the Conference of Ministers of Education and Cultural Affairs)

The Federal-State Conference (officially: "Conference of the Federal Chancellor with the Heads of Government of the States") is an unofficial body of the Federal Government and the federal states that was convened for the first time on 12 March 2020 to coordinate measures under the Infection Protection Act (Infektionsschutzgesetz, IfSG) to combat the COVID-19 pandemic in Germany nationwide.

=== Italy ===
The Conference of Regions and Autonomous Provinces, originally named "Conference of Presidents of Regions and Autonomous Provinces", is a political body of coordination between the Regions of Italy and, chiefly, their presidents.

The Conference, established in Pomezia, Lazio on 15–16 January 1981, is composed of 21 members, including the representatives of the autonomous provinces of Trentino and South Tyrol, which form the Region of Trentino-Alto Adige/Südtirol.

=== India ===
The Constitution of India in Article 263, provided that an Inter-State Council (ISC) may be established "if at any time it appears to the President that the public interests would be served by the establishment of a Council". Therefore, the constitution itself did not establish the ISC, because it was not considered necessary at the time the constitution was being framed, but kept the option for its establishment open. This option was exercised in 1990. Therefore, the ISC was established as a non permanent body (According to the ISC secratariate website)on 28 May 1990 by a presidential order on recommendation of Sarkaria Commission.

The Prime Minister of India and the chief ministers have held meetings, each known as a "Conference of Chief Ministers".

=== Mexico ===
The National Governors Conference is a non-governmental organization in Mexico that consists of the governors of the states of Mexico. The organization, known by the acronym CONAGO, was established in 2001 with a meeting of 20 governors in Mazatlan. The following year, 2002, marked the first meeting of CONAGO at which the governors of all 31 states attended.

=== Nigeria ===
The Nigeria Governors' Forum is a non-partisan association that was created to enhance collaboration among the executive governors of Nigeria. As of 2024, the chairman of the association is Governor AbdulRahman AbdulRazaq of Kwara State.

=== Pakistan ===
The Council of Common Interests (CCI) is a constitutional body in the Government of Pakistan. It is appointed by the President on the advice of the Prime Minister. The CCI resolves the disputes of power sharing between the federation and its provinces. The council works under Ministry of Inter Provincial Coordination and is responsible to both houses of Parliament, the Senate of Pakistan and the National Assembly of Pakistan.

=== Russia ===
The President of Russia has held meetings with the elected heads of the regions, but there is no formal structure.

=== South Africa ===
There is no formal structure to facilitate intergovernmental relations between the national and provincial executives. Ministers and MECs do meet informally, however, in what is known as the Ministerial and Member of the Executive Council Meetings (MINMEC). This is a meeting between the Minister and the nine provincial MECs who deal with the same portfolio. In 2017, the President of South Africa met all 9 premiers.

The Constitution of South Africa does not say specifically how the different levels of government will relate. Instead intergovernmental relations are governed by the Intergovernmental Relations Framework Act of 2005.

=== Spain ===
The Conference of Presidents is the highest-level political body for cooperation and the autonomous communities and the Government of Spain. It is at the top of the group of multilateral cooperation bodies. It has no constitutional or statutory basis. It is made up of the Prime Minister of Spain, (known as "president" in Spanish: Presidente), and who presides, the 17 presidents of the autonomous communities and the 2 mayors-president autonomous cities of Ceuta and Melilla. A first meeting under the presidency of Felipe González in 1990 can be considered precedent-setting.

=== Switzerland ===
The Conference of the Cantonal Governments (Konferenz der Kantonsregierung., KdK) is a political platform of the cantonal governments in Switzerland, which serves to form opinions and exchange experiences within the cantons as well as to promote cooperation in the representation of interests vis-à-vis the federal government and abroad. Since the cantons, along with the population, are part of the state power of Switzerland, this conference (as are the regional government conferences and the directors' conferences) is of great importance. The KdK serves as the central contact point for the Federal Council as a whole for the federalist dialogue between the administration and the cantons and holds discussion with the Council of States.

=== United Kingdom ===
The Prime Minister and Heads of Devolved Governments Council brings together the Prime Minister of the United Kingdom, the First Minister of Scotland, the First Minister of Wales and the First Minister and Deputy First Minister of Northern Ireland. The Council of Nations and Regions brings together the prime minister, the first ministers for the three devolved administrations, the Mayor of London and the mayors of England's combined authorities.

=== United States ===
The National Governors Association (NGA) is an American political organization founded in 1908. The association's members are the governors of the 55 states, territories and commonwealths. Members come from across the political spectrum. NGA declares itself as nonpartisan.

The NGA serves as a public policy liaison between state governments and the federal government. NGA provides governors and their senior staff members with services that range from representing states on Capitol Hill and at the White House when discussing federal issues to developing policy reports on state programs and hosting networking seminars for state executive branch officials. The NGA Center for Best Practices focuses on state innovations and best practices on issues that range from education and health to technology, welfare reform, and the environment. NGA also provides management and technical assistance to both new and incumbent governors.
