= New West Partnership =

The New West Partnership is set of agreements that economically integrate the Canadian provinces of Alberta, British Columbia, Saskatchewan and Manitoba. They were created on April 30, 2010.

It is composed of:

- the New West Partnership Trade Agreement (NWPTA)
- the New West Partnership International Cooperation Agreement
- the New West Partnership Innovation Agreement

== Trade Agreement ==
The New West Partnership Trade Agreement (NWPTA) is an internal trade agreement that seeks to integrate the economies of three provinces. It is frequently characterized by supporters, critics, and the media as an extension of the pre-existing Trade, Investment and Labour Mobility Agreement (TILMA) between British Columbia and Alberta which was signed on 28 April 2006, and provides a virtual economic union between the two provinces. However the provincial government of Saskatchewan under the Saskatchewan Party's Brad Wall has said that the NWPTA provides more equitable treatment for Saskatchewan's Crown corporations which was one of the main public complaints that prevented Saskatchewan from joining TILMA in 2007.

The press release describing the NWPTA's creations describes it as

a comprehensive agreement to remove barriers to trade, investment and labour mobility between British Columbia, Alberta and Saskatchewan. The agreement covers all public sector entities, including government ministries and their agencies, boards and commissions, Crown corporations, municipalities, school boards and publicly-funded academic, health and social service organizations.

—

The New West Partnership Trade Agreement came into effect on July 1, 2010. Alberta and British Columbia already complied with the terms of the agreement at the time of its creation. Saskatchewan is supposed to fully implement the agreement by July 1, 2013. Manitoba joined the partnership on November 17, 2016.

== See also ==
- Canadian Agreement on Internal Trade
- Canada Minister for Internal Trade
