= 2024 Washington gubernatorial election =

- November 5, 2024
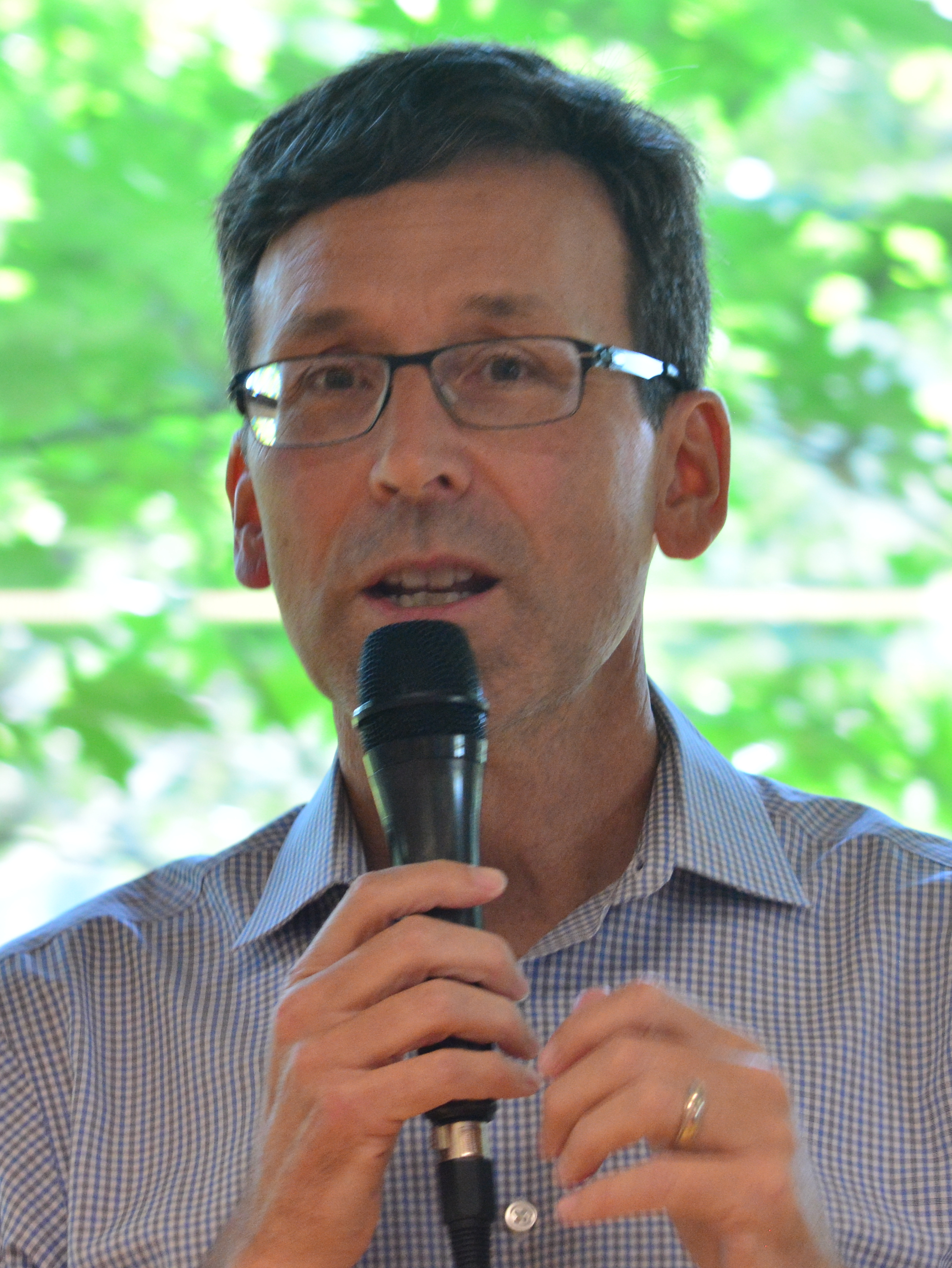

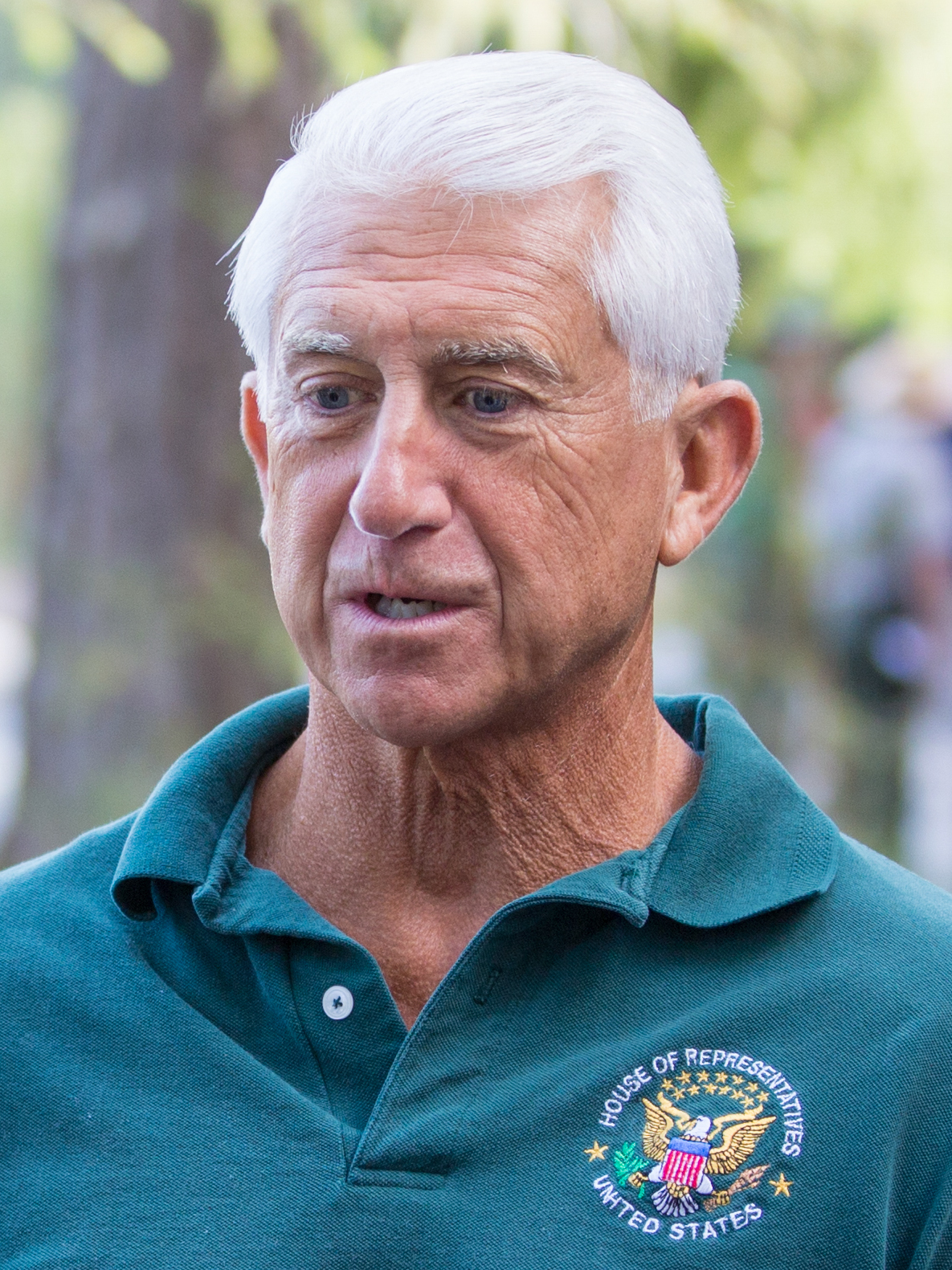
Candidate	Bob Ferguson	Dave Reichert
Party	Democratic	Republican
Popular vote	2,143,368	1,709,818
Percentage	55.51%	44.28%
- Ferguson: 40–50% 50–60% 60–70% 70–80% 80–90% >90% Reichert: 40–50% 50–60% 60–70% 70–80% 80–90% >90% Tie: 40–50% 50% No votes
Governor before election
Jay Inslee
Democratic
Elected Governor
Bob Ferguson
Democratic

The 2024 Washington gubernatorial election was held on November 5, 2024. The top-two primary was held on August 6. Incumbent Democratic Governor Jay Inslee was eligible to seek a fourth term but decided that he would not do so. The Democratic candidate, state Attorney General Bob Ferguson, defeated the Republican candidate, former Congressman Dave Reichert, who conceded defeat on November 19. Ferguson defeated Reichert with 55.51% of the vote in the general election. He also became the first Democrat to win Clallam County since 2000.

This election marked the 11th consecutive victory of the Democratic candidate for governor of Washington. Washington has not had a Republican governor since John Spellman left office in 1985, the longest streak of Democratic leadership of any state in the country and the third-longest streak of one-party leadership after South Dakota (which has not had a Democratic governor since Harvey Wollman left office in 1979) and Utah (which has not had a Democratic governor since Scott Matheson left office nine days prior to Spellman in 1985).

== Primary election ==
Washington is one of two states that holds a top-two primary, meaning that all candidates are listed on the same ballot regardless of party affiliation, and the top two advance to the general election.

The filing deadline was May 10, 2024. On that day, two candidates named Bob Ferguson entered the race at the behest of a conservative activist who sought people with the same surname as Washington Attorney General Bob Ferguson, who was considered the Democratic frontrunner. The two new candidates—a retired state employee and a U.S. Army veteran—resigned from the race on May 13, the deadline to withdraw, after questions about the legality of their campaigns arose. Washington's state statutes prohibit a new candidate with the same surname as an already-filed candidate from running with the intent to confuse or mislead voters.

=== Democratic candidates ===
==== Advanced to general ====
- Bob Ferguson, Washington Attorney General

==== Eliminated in primary ====
- Ricky Anthony, retiree
- Edward Cale IV, postal worker
- Fred Grant, communications professional
- Cassondra Hanson, retail worker
- Chaytan Inman, artificial intelligence engineer
- EL'ona Kearney, forgiveness coach
- Mark Mullet, state senator
- Don Rivers, retired King County Metro worker and perennial candidate

==== Withdrawn ====
- Bob Arthur Ferguson, former state employee
- Bob Benjamin Ferguson, veteran
- Hilary Franz, Washington State Commissioner of Public Lands (ran for U.S. House)

==== Declined ====
- Dow Constantine, King County Executive
- Denny Heck, Lieutenant Governor of Washington and former U.S. representative from Washington's 10th congressional district (ran for re-election)
- Jay Inslee, incumbent governor and candidate for President of the United States in 2020 (endorsed Ferguson)

=== Republican candidates ===
==== Advanced to general ====
- Dave Reichert, former U.S. representative for Washington's 8th congressional district (2005–2019)

==== Eliminated in primary ====
- Semi Bird, former P.C.O. and chair for the Benton County Republican Party (2022–2024) and former Richland school board member (2021–2023)
- A.L. Brown
- Jim Daniel, former Klickitat Hospital Board commissioner
- Bill Hirt, retired aircraft engineer and perennial candidate
- Jennifer Hoover, pastor
- Martin Wheeler, farmer and candidate for governor in 2020

==== Withdrawn ====
- Raul Garcia, physician and candidate for governor in 2020 (endorsed Reichert, ran for U.S. Senate)

==== Declined ====
- Bruce Dammeier, Pierce County Executive (2017–present) and former state senator (2013–2017) (endorsed Reichert)
- Jaime Herrera Beutler, former U.S. representative for Washington's 3rd congressional district (2011–2023) (ran for Public Lands Commissioner)
- Loren Culp, former Republic police chief, runner-up for governor in 2020, and candidate for Washington's 4th congressional district in 2022 (endorsed Bird)
- Drew MacEwen, state senator (ran for U.S. House, endorsed Reichert)
- J.T. Wilcox, state representative and former Minority Leader of the Washington House of Representatives

=== Third-party and independent candidates ===
==== Eliminated in primary ====
- Brian Bogen (Independent), businessman
- Jim Clark (Independent), computer programmer
- William Combs (Independent), U.S. Navy veteran
- Jeff Curry (Independent), school bus driver
- Frank Dare (Independent), retiree
- Michael DePaula (Libertarian), enterprise engineer
- Leon Lawson (Trump Republican (Note: Not an actual political party. In Washington, independent candidates are allowed to choose a ballot label)), used car dealer, proponent of the QAnon conspiracy theory, candidate for governor in 2020, and candidate for U.S. Senate in 2022
- Alan Makayev (Nonsense Busters), property manager
- Rosetta Marshall-Williams (Independence)
- Brad Mjelde (Independent), retired businessman
- Andre Stackhouse (Green), Whole Washington (nonprofit) executive director
- Alex Tsimerman (Standup-America), business consultant and perennial candidate

=== Endorsements ===
Semi Bird (R)

County officials

- 6 County sheriffs

Local officials

- Loren Culp, former Republic police chief and candidate for governor in 2020

Individuals

- Joe Kent, candidate for Washington's 3rd congressional district in 2022 and 2024

Political parties

- Washington State Republican Party

Party chapters

- Benton County Republican Party
- Clark County Republican Party
- Cowlitz County Republican Party
- Skagit County Republican Party
- Spokane County Republican Party
- Snohomish County Republican Party
- Yakima County Republican Party
Bob Ferguson (D)

U.S. senators

- Maria Cantwell, U.S. senator from Washington (2001–present)
- Patty Murray, U.S. senator from Washington (1993–present)

U.S. representatives

- Suzan DelBene (WA-01)
- Pramila Jayapal (WA-07)
- Derek Kilmer (WA-06) (2013-2025)
- Rick Larsen (WA-02)
- Adam Smith (WA-09)

Statewide officials

- Jay Inslee, incumbent governor of Washington
- Terry Bergeson, former Washington Superintendent of Public Instruction
- Peter Goldmark, former Washington State Commissioner of Public Lands
- Christine Gregoire, former governor of Washington
- Mike Pellicciotti, Washington State Treasurer

State legislators

- 25 state senators
- 31 state representatives

County officials

- 7 King County councilors
- Satpal Sidhu, Whatcom County Executive

Local officials

- All 5 Seattle Port Commission members
- Sally Bagshaw, former Seattle city councilor
- David Della, former Seattle city councilor
- Bruce Harrell, mayor of Seattle
- Pete Holmes, former Seattle City Attorney
- Tim Leavitt, former mayor of Vancouver
- Greg Nickels, former mayor of Seattle
- Royce Pollard, former mayor of Vancouver
- Dan Strauss, Seattle city councilor

Tribal officials

- Fawn Sharp, vice chair of the Quinault Indian Nation and president of the National Congress of American Indians
- Tom Wooten, chair of the Samish Indian Nation

Individuals

- Paul Berendt, former chair of the Washington Democratic Party
- Carmen Best, former Chief of the Seattle Police Department

Newspapers

- The Seattle Times
- The Stranger

Organizations

- Brady PAC
- Fuse Washington

Labor unions

- International Brotherhood of Electrical Workers Local 46 and 77
- International Federation of Professional and Technical Engineers
- 5 SEIU locals (Note: Locals 6, 775, 925, Healthcare 1199NW, and Committee of Interns and Residents)
- Teamsters Local 28
- United Auto Workers
- United Farm Workers
- United Food and Commercial Workers Local 3000
- Washington State Labor Council

Tribes

- Confederated Tribes of the Colville Reservation
- Snoqualmie Indian Tribe
Mark Mullet (D)

Statewide officials

- Steve Hobbs, Washington Secretary of State

State legislators

- Annette Cleveland, state senator from the 49th district
- Mia Gregerson, state representative from the 33rd district
- Brian Hatfield, former state senator from the 19th district
- John Lovick, state senator from the 44th district
- Sharon Nelson, former state senator from the 34th district
- Kevin Van De Wege, state senator from the 24th district
- Amy Walen, state representative from the 48th district

Local officials

- Jared Mead, Snohomish County Councilor and former state representative
- Sara Nelson, Seattle city councilor

Organizations

- Building Industry Association of Washington
- International Union of Operating Engineers Local 302
Dave Reichert (R)

Statewide officials

- Rob McKenna, former Washington Attorney General and runner-up for governor in 2012

Local officials

- Nadine Woodward, former mayor of Spokane

County officials

- Bruce Dammeier, Pierce County Executive
- Reagan Dunn, King County councilor

Organizations

- Building Industry Association of Washington
- National Federation of Independent Business

Party chapters

- Grant County Republican Party
- Pierce County Republican Party
Hilary Franz (D) (withdrawn)

Organizations

- National Women's Political Caucus of Washington

=== Polling ===
Poll source	Date(s) administered	Sample size (Note: Key: A – all adults RV – registered voters LV – likely voters V – unclear)	Margin of error	Semi Bird (R)	Bob Ferguson (D)	Mark Mullet (D)	Dave Reichert (R)	Undecided
Public Policy Polling (D) (Note: Poll sponsored by the Northwest Progressive Institute)	July 24–25, 2024	581 (LV)	± 4.0%	10%	39%	5%	28%	18%
SurveyUSA (Note: Poll sponsored by The Seattle Times, KING 5, and the University of Washington Center for an Informed Public)	July 10–13, 2024	564 (LV)	± 5.2%	7%	42%	4%	33%	14%
RMG Research	May 20–23, 2024	800 (RV)	–	4%	33%	5%	31%	21%
Cascade PBS/Elway Research	May 13–16, 2024	403 (RV)	± 5.0%	5%	22%	6%	20%	47%
Public Policy Polling (D)	May 15–16, 2024	615 (LV)	± 4.0%	11%	35%	4%	28%	22%
Echelon Insights (Note: Poll sponsored by Concerned Taxpayers of Washington State PAC)	March 18–21, 2024	600 (RV)	± 4.7%	7%	23%	5%	28%	37%
Public Policy Polling (D)	February 13–14, 2024	789 (LV)	± 3.5%	9%	35%	4%	27%	25%
Echelon Insights (Note: Poll sponsored by Future 42, a conservative group)	December 9–13, 2023	500 (RV)	± 5.5%	5%	27%	3%	28%	37%
Public Policy Polling (D)	November 14–15, 2023	700 (LV)	± 3.7%	10%	31%	5%	31%	22%

Hypothetical polling

with Bird, Ferguson, Franz, Garcia, and Mullet

Poll source	Date(s) administered	Sample size	Margin of error	Semi Bird (R)	Bob Ferguson (D)	Hilary Franz (D)	Raul Garcia (R)	Mark Mullet (D)	Undecided
Public Policy Polling (D)	Jun 7–8, 2023	773 (LV)	± 3.5%	10%	25%	9%	17%	7%	33%

with Constantine, Dammeier, Ferguson, and Franz

Poll source	Date(s) administered	Sample size	Margin of error	Dow Constantine (D)	Bruce Dammeier (R)	Bob Ferguson (D)	Hilary Franz (D)	Other / Undecided
Public Policy Polling (D)	March 7–8, 2023	874 (LV)	± 3.3%	7%	35%	21%	7%	30%

with Inslee, generic Republican, and generic Democrat

Poll source	Date(s) administered	Sample size	Margin of error	Jay Inslee (D)	Generic Republican	Generic Democrat	Undecided
Crosscut/Elway	December 27–29, 2022	403 (RV)	± 5%	34%	35%	17%	14%

=== Results ===
County results Ferguson: 20–30%; 30–40%; 40–50%; 60–70%; Reichert: 20–30%; 30–40%; 40–50%; 50–60%

Congressional district results Ferguson: 30–40%; 40–50%; 50–60%; 70–80%; Reichert: 30–40%

Blanket primary results
Party	Candidate	Votes	%
Democratic	Bob Ferguson	884,268	44.88%
Republican	Dave Reichert	541,533	27.48%
Republican	Semi Bird	212,692	10.79%
Democratic	Mark Mullet	119,048	6.04%
Trump Republican	Leon Lawson	35,971	1.83%
Republican	Jim Daniel	29,907	1.52%
Democratic	Cassondra Hanson	24,512	1.24%
Democratic	EL'ona Kearney	24,374	1.24%
Republican	Jennifer Hoover	15,692	0.80%
Green	Andre Stackhouse	11,962	0.61%
Democratic	Don Rivers	9,453	0.48%
Republican	Martin Wheeler	7,676	0.39%
Democratic	Chaytan Inman	6,427	0.33%
Democratic	Ricky Anthony	6,226	0.32%
Independent	Jeff Curry	6,068	0.31%
Democratic	Fred Grant	5,503	0.28%
Independent	Brian Bogen	4,530	0.23%
Republican	A.L. Brown	4,232	0.21%
Libertarian	Michael DePaula	3,957	0.20%
Independence	Rosetta Marshall-Williams	2,960	0.15%
Independent	Jim Clark	2,355	0.12%
Democratic	Edward Cale	1,975	0.10%
Standup-America	Alex Tsimerman	1,721	0.09%
Republican	Bill Hirt	1,720	0.09%
Write-in		1,347	0.07%
Independent	Frank Dare	1,115	0.06%
Nonsense Busters	Alan Makayev	1,106	0.06%
Independent	William Combs	1,042	0.05%
Independent	Brad Mjelde	991	0.05%
Total votes		1,970,363	100.00%

==== By county ====
Combined partisan vote by county Democratic: 40–50%; 50–60%; 70–80%; Republican: 50–60%; 60–70%; 70–80%; 80–90%

Combined partisan vote by congressional district Democratic: 50–60%; 60–70%; 80–90%; Republican: 50–60%; 60–70%

County results
County	Bob Ferguson Democratic		Dave Reichert Republican		Semi Bird Republican		Mark Mullet Democratic		Other candidates Various parties		Margin		Total votes
County	#	%	#	%	#	%	#	%	#	%	#	%	Total votes
Adams	358	14.34%	1,267	50.74%	398	15.94%	75	3.00%	399	15.98%	-869	-34.80%	2,497
Asotin	1,411	24.70%	2,058	36.03%	715	12.52%	262	4.59%	1,266	22.16%	-647	-11.33%	5,712
Benton	13,110	26.01%	15,175	30.11%	12,869	25.53%	1,991	3.95%	7,255	14.39%	-2,065	-4.10%	50,400
Chelan	7,555	33.31%	10,963	48.34%	1,861	8.21%	629	2.77%	1,672	7.37%	-3,408	-15.03%	22,680
Clallam	13,014	44.42%	7,774	26.53%	3,691	12.60%	1,544	5.27%	3,277	11.18%	5,240	17.88%	29,300
Clark	49,356	36.84%	20,533	15.33%	31,590	23.58%	9,422	7.03%	23,072	17.22%	17,766	13.26%	133,973
Columbia	240	18.24%	459	34.88%	301	22.87%	101	7.67%	215	16.34%	-158	-12.01%	1,316
Cowlitz	7,946	27.33%	8,309	28.57%	4,912	16.89%	1,109	3.81%	6,802	23.39%	-363	-1.25%	29,078
Douglas	2,687	23.91%	5,967	53.09%	1,389	12.36%	250	2.22%	946	8.42%	-3,280	-29.18%	11,239
Ferry	555	22.91%	1,038	42.84%	413	17.04%	55	2.27%	362	14.94%	-483	-19.93%	2,423
Franklin	3,092	21.87%	4,372	30.92%	3,508	24.81%	510	3.61%	2,657	18.79%	-864	-6.11%	14,139
Garfield	97	12.83%	429	56.75%	71	9.39%	13	1.72%	146	19.31%	-332	-43.92%	756
Grant	3,001	17.64%	8,428	49.53%	2,334	13.72%	298	1.75%	2,955	17.37%	-5,427	-31.89%	17,016
Grays Harbor	7,184	36.11%	7,667	38.54%	2,075	10.43%	738	3.71%	2,229	11.20%	-483	-2.43%	19,893
Island	14,757	47.72%	9,562	30.92%	2,586	8.36%	1,120	3.62%	2,897	9.37%	5,195	16.80%	30,922
Jefferson	10,258	64.21%	2,580	16.15%	1,234	7.72%	719	4.50%	1,184	7.41%	7,678	48.06%	15,975
King	340,334	61.30%	109,374	19.70%	19,521	3.52%	45,323	8.16%	40,674	7.33%	230,960	41.60%	555,226
Kitsap	39,798	46.98%	23,858	28.16%	7,527	8.88%	4,744	5.60%	8,789	10.37%	15,940	18.82%	84,716
Kittitas	3,557	28.95%	5,191	42.25%	1,897	15.44%	475	3.87%	1,167	9.50%	-1,634	-13.30%	12,287
Klickitat	2,394	31.66%	1,300	17.19%	2,135	28.24%	373	4.93%	1,359	17.97%	259	3.43%	7,561
Lewis	5,457	22.30%	13,169	53.81%	2,795	11.42%	641	2.62%	2,411	9.85%	-7,712	-31.51%	24,473
Lincoln	591	14.75%	1,667	41.61%	1,062	26.51%	100	2.50%	586	14.63%	-605	-15.10%	4,006
Mason	7,306	36.55%	7,530	37.67%	2,490	12.46%	718	3.59%	1,945	9.73%	-224	-1.12%	19,989
Okanogan	3,598	30.03%	4,192	34.98%	2,023	16.88%	426	3.56%	1,744	14.55%	-594	-4.96%	11,983
Pacific	3,028	36.62%	2,613	31.60%	842	10.18%	259	3.13%	1,527	18.47%	415	5.02%	8,269
Pend Oreille	1,051	23.24%	1,378	30.47%	1,253	27.71%	116	2.57%	724	16.01%	-125	-2.76%	4,522
Pierce	83,810	39.68%	80,480	38.11%	14,720	6.97%	12,594	5.96%	19,599	9.28%	3,330	1.58%	211,203
San Juan	4,995	62.02%	1,544	19.17%	194	2.41%	501	6.22%	820	10.18%	3,451	42.85%	8,054
Skagit	15,852	42.44%	11,750	31.46%	4,053	10.85%	2,053	5.50%	3,640	9.75%	4,102	10.98%	37,348
Skamania	1,188	29.48%	661	16.40%	1,106	27.44%	223	5.53%	852	21.14%	82	2.03%	4,030
Snohomish	88,626	43.74%	62,101	30.65%	16,876	8.33%	13,931	6.88%	21,089	10.41%	26,525	13.09%	202,623
Spokane	50,788	35.43%	37,402	26.09%	31,314	21.85%	5,425	3.78%	18,407	12.84%	13,386	9.34%	143,336
Stevens	2,923	18.46%	5,312	33.54%	4,497	28.40%	493	3.11%	2,612	16.49%	-815	-5.15%	15,837
Thurston	40,935	46.71%	29,218	33.34%	4,493	5.13%	5,572	6.36%	7,414	8.46%	11,717	13.37%	87,632
Wahkiakum	526	29.34%	609	33.97%	258	14.39%	58	3.23%	342	19.07%	-83	-4.63%	1,793
Walla Walla	5,019	34.16%	3,660	24.91%	2,909	19.80%	447	3.04%	2,656	18.08%	1,359	9.25%	14,691
Whatcom	34,120	47.40%	17,267	23.99%	9,872	13.71%	3,523	4.89%	7,203	10.01%	16,853	23.41%	71,985
Whitman	3,215	34.24%	3,243	34.54%	929	9.89%	332	3.54%	1,671	17.80%	-28	-0.30%	9,390
Yakima	10,536	25.03%	11,433	27.16%	9,979	23.71%	1,885	4.48%	8,257	19.62%	-897	-2.13%	42,090
Totals	884,268	44.88%	541,533	27.48%	212,692	10.79%	119,048	6.04%	212,822	10.80%	342,735	17.39%	1,970,363

==== By congressional district ====
District	Ferguson	Reichert	Bird	Mullet	Representative
1st	48%	28%	7%	8%	Suzan DelBene
2nd	48%	27%	10%	6%	Rick Larsen
3rd	33%	24%	20%	6%	Marie Gluesenkamp Perez
4th	25%	33%	22%	4%	Dan Newhouse
5th	32%	28%	22%	4%	Cathy McMorris Rodgers
6th	47%	30%	9%	5%	Derek Kilmer
7th	75%	10%	2%	7%	Pramila Jayapal
8th	37%	38%	9%	8%	Kim Schrier
9th	56%	23%	4%	7%	Adam Smith
10th	44%	35%	5%	6%	Marilyn Strickland

== General election ==
=== Predictions ===
Source	Ranking	As of
The Cook Political Report	Likely D	August 27, 2024
Inside Elections	Likely D	September 1, 2023
Sabato's Crystal Ball	Likely D	June 4, 2024
RCP	Likely D	July 13, 2024
Elections Daily	Safe D	July 12, 2023
CNalysis	Solid D	August 17, 2024

=== Fundraising ===
Campaign finance reports as of November 5, 2024
Candidate	Raised	Spent	Cash on hand
Bob Ferguson (D)	$14,091,789	$13,939,376	$152,413
Dave Reichert (R)	$6,729,173	$6,226,422	$502,751
Source: Washington State Public Disclosure Commission

=== Debates ===
Date	Ferguson	Reichert	Link
September 11, 2024	Participant	Participant	YouTube
September 18, 2024	Participant	Participant	YouTube

=== Polling ===
Aggregate polls

Source of poll aggregation	Dates administered	Dates updated	Bob Ferguson (D)	Dave Reichert (R)	Undecided (Note: Calculated by taking the difference of 100% and all other candidates combined.)	Margin
270ToWin	October 17 – November 4, 2024	November 4, 2024	50.8%	38.0%	11.2%	Ferguson +12.8%

Poll source	Date(s) administered	Sample size	Margin of error	Bob Ferguson (D)	Dave Reichert (R)	Other	Undecided
Research Co.	November 2–3, 2024	450 (LV)	± 4.6%	54%	40%	1%	5%
ActiVote	October 3–29, 2024	400 (LV)	± 4.9%	59%	41%	–	–
ActiVote	September 14 – October 20, 2024	400 (LV)	± 4.9%	58%	42%	–	–
Public Policy Polling (D)	October 16–17, 2024	571 (LV)	± 4.1%	48%	41%	–	10%
Strategies 360	October 11–16, 2024	600 (RV)	± 4.0%	51%	41%	–	8%
SurveyUSA	October 9–14, 2024	703 (LV)	± 4.9%	50%	34%	–	16%
Cascade PBS/Elway Research	October 8–12, 2024	401 (LV)	± 5.0%	51%	37%	1% (Note: "Someone else" with 1%)	11%
RMG Research (R) (Note: Poll sponsored by the Napolitan Institute and Future 42, a conservative group)	September 18–20, 2024	800 (RV)	± 3.5%	48%	40%	3% (Note: "Some other candidate" with 3%)	9%
Cascade PBS/Elway Research	September 3–6, 2024	403 (RV)	± 5.0%	50%	39%	3% (Note: "No answer" with 2%; "I may not vote in this race" with 1%)	9%
Cygnal (R)	August 28–30, 2024	500 (LV)	± 4.4%	48%	45%	–	8%
Public Policy Polling (D)	July 24–25, 2024	581 (LV)	± 4.0%	49%	43%	–	8%
DHM Research	July 12–17, 2024	500 (RV)	± 4.4%	45%	32%	10% (Note: "Someone else" with 10%)	12%
Public Policy Polling (D)	May 15–16, 2024	615 (LV)	± 4.0%	48%	42%	–	10%
Echelon Insights (R)	March 18–21, 2024	600 (RV)	± 4.7%	30%	39%	–	31%
Public Policy Polling (D)	February 13–14, 2024	789 (LV)	± 3.5%	46%	42%	–	11%
Echelon Insights (R)	December 9–13, 2023	500 (LV)	± 5.5%	35%	39%	–	26%
Public Policy Polling (D)	November 14–15, 2023	700 (LV)	± 3.5%	44%	46%	–	9%

Hypothetical polling

Bob Ferguson vs. Semi Bird

Poll source	Date(s) administered	Sample size	Margin of error	Bob Ferguson (D)	Semi Bird (R)	Undecided
Public Policy Polling (D)	July 24–25, 2024	581 (LV)	± 4.0%	52%	38%	10%

=== Results ===
2024 Washington gubernatorial election
Party	Candidate	Votes	%	±%
Democratic	Bob Ferguson	2,143,368	55.51%	−1.05%
Republican	Dave Reichert	1,709,818	44.28%	+1.16%
Write-in		8,202	0.21%	-0.11%
Total votes		3,861,388	100.00%	N/A
Democratic hold				

==== By county ====
County	Bob Ferguson Democratic		Dave Reichert Republican		Write-in Various		Margin		Total
County	#	%	#	%	#	%	#	%	Total
Adams	1,396	26.47%	3,865	73.28%	13	0.25%	-2,469	-46.81%	5,274
Asotin	4,030	35.82%	7,198	63.97%	24	0.21%	-3,168	-28.15%	11,252
Benton	35,632	36.01%	63,118	63.79%	200	0.20%	-27,486	-27.78%	98,950
Chelan	17,205	41.22%	24,465	58.61%	69	0.17%	-7,260	-17.39%	41,739
Clallam	24,709	51.56%	23,100	48.20%	116	0.24%	1,609	3.36%	47,925
Clark	137,977	51.41%	130,045	48.46%	360	0.13%	7,932	2.96%	268,382
Columbia	627	25.75%	1,797	73.80%	11	0.45%	-1,170	-48.05%	2,435
Cowlitz	22,143	38.02%	36,035	61.87%	69	0.12%	-13,892	-23.85%	58,247
Douglas	7,009	33.45%	13,907	66.37%	38	0.18%	-6,898	-32.92%	20,954
Ferry	1,258	30.89%	2,806	68.89%	9	0.22%	-1,548	-38.01%	4,073
Franklin	11,385	36.61%	19,676	63.28%	35	0.11%	-8,291	-26.66%	31,096
Garfield	299	21.94%	1,064	78.06%	0	0.00%	-765	-56.13%	1,363
Grant	10,448	29.28%	25,186	70.57%	54	0.15%	-14,738	-41.30%	35,688
Grays Harbor	16,558	44.27%	20,740	55.45%	106	0.28%	-4,182	-11.18%	37,404
Island	27,931	53.99%	23,677	45.76%	130	0.25%	4,254	8.22%	51,738
Jefferson	17,201	69.99%	7,312	29.75%	62	0.25%	9,889	40.24%	24,575
King	797,248	71.57%	314,226	28.21%	2,523	0.23%	483,022	43.36%	1,113,997
Kitsap	87,731	56.67%	66,682	43.08%	389	0.25%	21,049	13.60%	154,802
Kittitas	9,662	36.99%	16,394	62.76%	67	0.26%	-6,732	-25.77%	26,123
Klickitat	5,691	42.68%	7,625	57.18%	19	0.14%	-1,934	-14.50%	13,335
Lewis	13,751	30.61%	31,084	69.19%	90	0.20%	-17,333	-38.58%	44,925
Lincoln	1,591	22.44%	5,472	77.17%	28	0.39%	-3,881	-54.73%	7,091
Mason	16,173	44.63%	19,942	55.03%	121	0.33%	-3,769	-10.40%	36,236
Okanogan	8,190	40.16%	12,161	59.63%	44	0.22%	-3,971	-19.47%	20,395
Pacific	6,676	47.52%	7,352	52.33%	21	0.15%	-676	-4.81%	14,049
Pend Oreille	2,464	29.17%	5,960	70.57%	22	0.26%	-3,496	-41.39%	8,446
Pierce	220,153	50.79%	212,218	48.96%	1,044	0.24%	7,935	1.83%	433,415
San Juan	9,348	73.14%	3,400	26.60%	33	0.26%	5,948	46.54%	12,781
Skagit	34,821	50.32%	34,231	49.46%	151	0.22%	590	0.85%	69,203
Skamania	3,058	42.60%	4,109	57.24%	11	0.15%	-1,051	-14.64%	7,178
Snohomish	225,276	54.99%	183,458	44.78%	945	0.23%	41,818	10.21%	409,679
Spokane	127,594	45.25%	153,974	54.61%	391	0.14%	-26,380	-9.36%	281,959
Stevens	7,256	25.92%	20,673	73.86%	60	0.21%	-13,417	-47.94%	27,989
Thurston	90,696	55.69%	71,764	44.06%	405	0.25%	18,932	11.62%	162,865
Wahkiakum	1,158	38.48%	1,845	61.32%	6	0.20%	-687	-22.83%	3,009
Walla Walla	12,408	42.55%	16,730	57.37%	25	0.09%	-4,322	-14.82%	29,163
Whatcom	81,435	59.68%	54,769	40.14%	247	0.18%	26,666	19.54%	136,451
Whitman	10,087	51.09%	9,610	48.68%	45	0.23%	477	2.42%	19,742
Yakima	35,093	40.12%	52,148	59.62%	219	0.25%	-17,055	-19.50%	87,460
Totals	2,143,368	55.51%	1,709,818	44.28%	8,202	0.21%	433,550	11.23%	3,861,388

Counties that flipped from Republican to Democratic

- Clallam (largest city: Port Angeles)

==== By congressional district ====
Ferguson won six of ten congressional districts, with the remaining four going to Reichert, including two that elected Democrats.

District	Ferguson	Reichert	Representative
1st	59%	40%	Suzan DelBene
2nd	58%	42%	Rick Larsen
3rd	46%	54%	Marie Gluesenkamp Perez
4th	37%	63%	Dan Newhouse
5th	42%	58%	Cathy McMorris Rodgers (118th Congress)
5th	42%	58%	Michael Baumgartner (119th Congress)
6th	56%	44%	Derek Kilmer (118th Congress)
6th	56%	44%	Emily Randall (119th Congress)
7th	84%	16%	Pramila Jayapal
8th	47%	53%	Kim Schrier
9th	67%	33%	Adam Smith
10th	55%	45%	Marilyn Strickland

== Notes ==
Partisan clients
