= 2024 Washington Public Lands Commissioner election =

- November 5, 2024
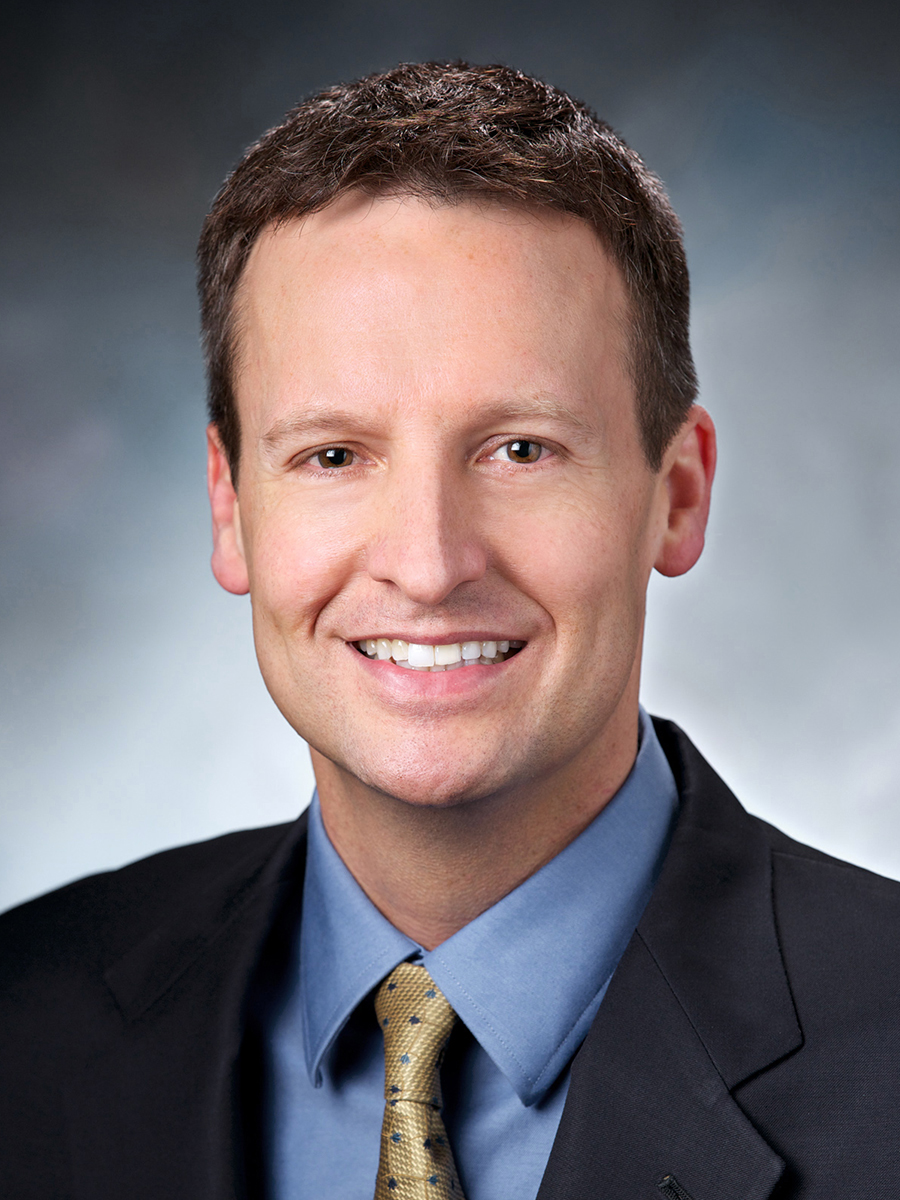

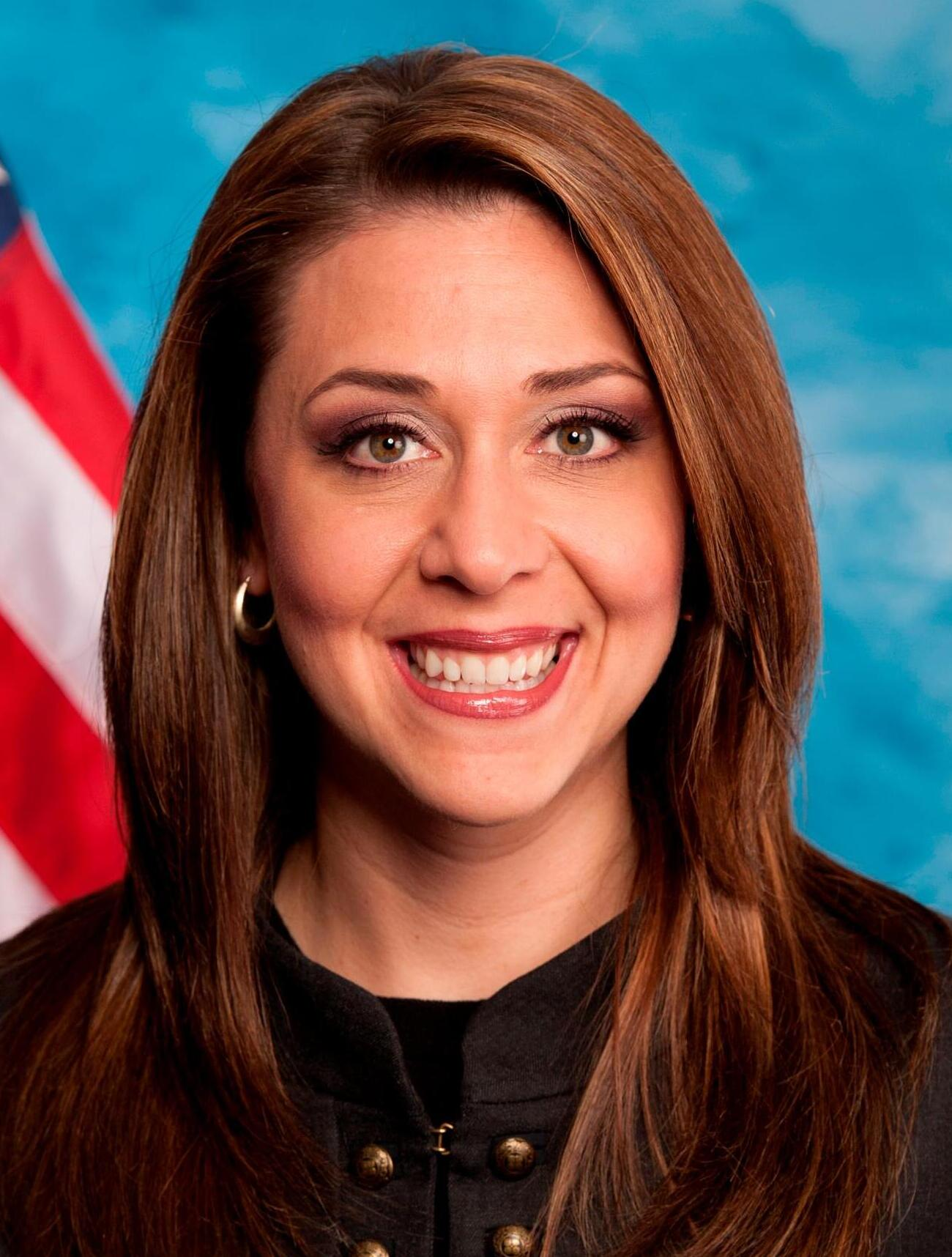
Candidate	Dave Upthegrove	Jaime Herrera Beutler
Party	Democratic	Republican
Popular vote	1,969,936	1,765,121
Percentage	52.62%	47.15%
- Upthegrove: 40–50% 50–60% 60–70% 70–80% 80–90% >90% Herrera Beutler: 40–50% 50–60% 60–70% 70–80% 80–90% >90% Tie: 40–50% 50% No votes
Public Lands Commissioner before election
Hilary Franz
Democratic
Elected Public Lands Commissioner
Dave Upthegrove
Democratic

The 2024 Washington Public Lands Commissioner election was held on November 5, 2024. Democrat Dave Upthegrove, a King County councilmember, defeated Republican Jaime Herrera Beutler, a former U.S. Representative from Washington's 3rd congressional district. The top-two primary was held on August 6. Incumbent Public Lands Commissioner Hilary Franz, elected in 2016 and re-elected in 2020, did not seek a third term, opting to run instead for governor.

The primary saw a close race with the Democratic vote split across five candidates, causing a recount in order to determine the winners and narrowly avoiding a lockout for the Democratic Party.

== Background ==
Current Public Lands Commissioner Hilary Franz, elected in 2016 and re-elected in 2020, did not seek a third term. She initially chose to run for governor, later dropping out of that race to instead run for the U.S. House. During the primary election, the race drew many candidates, including five Democrats and two Republicans. It was suggested that the numerous Democratic candidates might split the vote enough so that the two Republican candidates advance to the general election, locking out Democrats from the office.

The results of the primary election had Republican Jaime Herrera Beutler lead while the second-place position remained tight between Democrat Dave Upthegrove and Republican Sue Kuehl Pederson, with a margin of only 51 votes between the two. This triggered an automatic hand recount per Washington state laws. After a recount and certification of the results showed Upthegrove with a lead of 49 votes, he advanced to the general election thus ensuring that Democrats would not be locked out of the general election.

During their campaigns, both Upthegrove and Beutler focused on the protection and management of forests and public lands albeit with differing views of how such aims would be achieved. Upthegrove emphasized preservation of public lands, especially legacy forests (mature natural forests), and maintaining a balance between conservation and economical value of the forests. Beutler focused on the generation of revenue via logging and other activities to keep lands economically and environmentally sustainable, claiming that excessive preservation of legacy forests can lead to susceptibility to disease, raise wildfire risks, and reduce the stream of revenue on which schools and other public services rely. On tribal issues, Upthegrove supported strengthening the role of co-management with tribes while Beutler supported continuing Franz's creation of a tribal liaison.

== Primary election ==
Washington is one of two states that holds a top-two primary, meaning all candidates are listed on the same ballot regardless of party affiliation, and the top two advance to the general election.

=== Democratic candidates ===
==== Advanced to general ====
- Dave Upthegrove, King County councilmember (2014–2025)

==== Eliminated in primary ====
- Jeralee Anderson, Redmond city councilor (2021–present)
- Patrick DePoe, director of tribal relations for the Washington State Department of Natural Resources
- Allen Lebovitz, wildland fire and forest health liaison for the Washington State Department of Natural Resources
- Kevin Van De Wege, state senator from the 24th district (2017–present)

==== Withdrawn ====
- Mona Das, former state senator from the 47th district (2019–2023)
- Rebecca Saldaña, state senator from the 37th district (2016–present)

==== Declined ====
- Hilary Franz, incumbent Public Lands Commissioner (2017–2025) (ran for U.S. House, endorsed DePoe)

=== Republican candidates ===
==== Advanced to general ====
- Jaime Herrera Beutler, former U.S. Representative from Washington's 3rd congressional district (2011–2023)

==== Eliminated in primary ====
- Sue Kuehl Pederson, retired utility manager and runner-up for public lands commissioner in 2020

=== Endorsements ===
Jaime Herrera Beutler (R)

U.S. Representatives

- Dan Newhouse, U.S. Representative from Washington's 4th congressional district (2015–present)

Statewide officials

- Dan Evans, governor of Washington (1965–1977)

Individuals

- Joe Kent, project manager

Labor unions

- Association of Western Pulp and Paper Workers
- International Union of Painters and Allied Trades District Council 5

Organizations

- Mainstream Republicans of Washington
- Washington Association of Police Organizations
- Washington Farm Bureau

Newspapers

- The Columbian
- The Everett Herald

Tribes

- Yakama Nation
Sue Kuehl Pederson (R)

Political parties

- Washington State Republican Party
Patrick DePoe (D)

Statewide officials

- Hilary Franz, Washington State Commissioner of Public Lands (2017–present)

Labor unions

- Washington Education Association

Tribes

- Confederated Tribes of the Colville Reservation

Newspapers

- The Seattle Times
Dave Upthegrove (D)

Statewide officials

- Peter Goldmark, Washington State Commissioner of Public Lands (2009–2017)

Organizations

- 314 Action
- LGBTQ Victory Fund
- Sierra Club

Newspapers

- The Stranger
Mona Das (D) (withdrawn)

State legislators

- Claudia Kauffman, state senator

Local officials

- Tina Podlodowski, former Seattle city councilor and former chair of the Washington State Democratic Party
Rebecca Saldaña (D) (withdrawn)

Organizations

- Latino Victory Fund

=== Polling ===
Poll source	Date(s) administered	Sample size (Note: Key: A – all adults RV – registered voters LV – likely voters V – unclear)	Margin of error	Patrick DePoe (D)	Jaime Herrera Beutler (R)	Allen Lebovitz (D)	Sue Kuehl Pederson (R)	Dave Upthegrove (D)	Kevin Van De Wege (D)	Other	Undecided
Public Policy Polling (D) (Note: Poll conducted for The Cascadia Advocate)	July 24–25, 2024	581 (LV)	± 4.0%	4%	18%	3%	12%	6%	5%	5% (Note: Jeralee Anderson (D) with 5%)	48%
Public Policy Polling (D)	May 15–16, 2024	615 (LV)	± 4.0%	1%	16%	5%	12%	4%	2%	–	58%
Public Policy Polling (D)	November 14–15, 2023	700 (LV)	± 3.7%	5%	18%	–	14%	3%	2%	11% (Note: Rebecca Saldaña (D) with 6%; Mona Das (D) with 5%)	48%

=== Forum ===
2024 Washington Public Lands Commissioner primary candidate forum
No.	Date	Host	Moderator	Link	Democratic	Democratic	Republican	Republican	Democratic	Democratic	Democratic
Key: P Participant A Absent N Not invited I Invited W Withdrawn											
Key: P Participant A Absent N Not invited I Invited W Withdrawn					Anderson	DePoe	Herrera Beutler	Kuehl Pederson	Lebovitz	Upthegrove	Van De Wege
1	Jul. 18, 2024	League of Women Voters of Washington; The Columbian; The Reflector	Craig Brown	TVW	P	P	P	P	P	P	P

=== Results ===
A top-two primary took place on August 6. All candidates were listed on the same ballot regardless of party affiliation, and the top two advanced to the general election in November. Results were certified by county canvassing boards on August 20, showing Democrat Dave Upthegrove in second place, with a margin of only 51 votes (0.0027% of the total votes) over Republican Sue Kuehl Pederson, enough to trigger an automatic hand recount per Washington state laws.

On September 3, hand recounts returned with Upthegrove holding a 53-vote margin over Pederson. Results were certified on September 4, with Dave Upthegrove holding a final margin of 49 votes over Sue Kuehl Pederson, ensuring that Democrats would not be locked out of the general election.

County results Herrera Beutler: 20–30%; 30–40%; 40–50%; 50–60%; Upthegrove: 20–30%; 30–40%; Pederson: 20–30%; 30–40%; 40–50%; Van De Wege: 20–30%

Congressional district results Herrera Beutler: 20–30%; Upthegrove: 20–30%; 30–40%; 40–50%; Pederson: 20–30%; 30–40%

Blanket primary election results
Party	Candidate	Votes	%
Republican	Jaime Herrera Beutler	419,309	22.033
Democratic	Dave Upthegrove	396,304	20.824
Republican	Sue Kuehl Pederson	396,255	20.821
Democratic	Patrick DePoe	267,944	14.079
Democratic	Allen Lebovitz	194,118	10.200
Democratic	Kevin Van De Wege	143,174	7.523
Democratic	Jeralee Anderson	84,353	4.432
Write-in		1,658	0.087
Total votes		1,903,115	100.000

Combined partisan vote by county Democratic: 50–60%; 60–70%; 70–80%; Republican: 50–60%; 60–70%; 70–80%; 80–90%

Combined partisan vote by congressional district Democratic: 50–60%; 60–70%; 70–80%; 80–90%; Republican: 50–60%; 60–70%

Counties that flipped from Democratic to Republican

- Clark (largest city: Vancouver)

==== By congressional district ====
District	Upthegrove	Herrera Beutler	Pederson	DePoe	Lebovitz	Van De Wege	Representative
1st	21%	20%	17%	17%	11%	9%	Suzan DelBene
2nd	22%	20%	20%	15%	11%	8%	Rick Larsen
3rd	11%	28.8%	29.3%	12%	9%	6%	Marie Gluesenkamp Perez
4th	8%	32%	33%	9%	9%	5%	Dan Newhouse
5th	12%	27%	30%	9%	11%	7%	Cathy McMorris Rodgers
6th	19%	19.8%	20.4%	14%	11%	12%	Derek Kilmer
7th	46%	8%	6%	22%	9%	6%	Pramila Jayapal
8th	18%	27%	23%	12%	10%	6%	Kim Schrier
9th	32%	16%	13%	17%	11%	7%	Adam Smith
10th	19%	24%	19%	15%	11%	8%	Marilyn Strickland

== General election ==
=== Post-primary endorsements ===
Jaime Herrera Beutler (R)

Newspapers

- The Seattle Times

=== Polling ===
Poll source	Date(s) administered	Sample size (Note: Key: A – all adults RV – registered voters LV – likely voters V – unclear)	Margin of error	Dave Upthegrove (D)	Jaime Herrera Beutler (R)	Undecided
Public Policy Polling (D)	October 16–17, 2024	571 (LV)	± 4.1%	46%	38%	16%
Strategies 360	October 11–16, 2024	600 (RV)	± 4.0%	47%	38%	15%
Cascade PBS/Elway Research	October 8–12, 2024	401 (LV)	± 5.0%	41%	35%	24%

=== Debates & forums ===
2024 Washington Public Lands Commissioner debates & candidate forums
No.	Date	Host	Moderator	Link	Democratic	Republican
Key: P Participant A Absent N Not invited I Invited W Withdrawn						
Key: P Participant A Absent N Not invited I Invited W Withdrawn					Dave Upthegrove	Jaime Herrera Beutler
1	Sep. 18, 2024	Association of Washington Business	Bill Lucia	TVW	P	P
2	Sep. 25, 2024	League of Women Voters of Washington and Benton-Franklin Counties; Northwest Public Broadcasting	Matt Loveless	YouTube	P	P
3	Oct. 2, 2024	The Impact	Mike McClanahan	TVW	P	P
4	Oct. 7, 2024	Society of American Foresters	Samantha Chang	TVW	P	P

=== Results ===
2024 Washington Public Lands Commissioner election
Party	Candidate	Votes	%	±%
Democratic	Dave Upthegrove	1,969,936	52.62%	−4.07%
Republican	Jaime Herrera Beutler	1,765,121	47.15%	+3.94%
Write-in		8,394	0.22%	+0.12%
Total votes		3,743,451	100.00%	N/A
Democratic hold				

==== By county ====
County	Dave Upthegrove Democratic		Jaime Herrera Beutler Republican		Write-in Various		Margin		Total
County	#	%	#	%	#	%	#	%	Total
Adams	1,182	22.92%	3,962	76.81%	14	0.27%	-2,780	-53.90%	5,158
Asotin	3,395	31.12%	7,493	68.69%	20	0.18%	-4,098	-37.57%	10,908
Benton	31,896	33.06%	64,393	66.73%	203	0.21%	-32,497	-33.68%	96,492
Chelan	15,304	38.08%	24,828	61.78%	54	0.13%	-9,524	-23.70%	40,186
Clallam	23,010	49.17%	23,699	50.64%	91	0.19%	-689	-1.47%	46,800
Clark	122,529	47.03%	136,098	52.24%	1,916	0.74%	-13,569	-5.21%	260,543
Columbia	535	22.58%	1,827	77.12%	7	0.30%	-1,292	-54.54%	2,369
Cowlitz	19,536	34.38%	36,881	64.90%	409	0.72%	-17,345	-30.52%	56,826
Douglas	6,326	31.18%	13,921	68.62%	41	0.20%	-7,595	-37.44%	20,288
Ferry	1,105	27.78%	2,866	72.05%	7	0.18%	-1,761	-44.27%	3,978
Franklin	10,443	34.11%	20,127	65.74%	46	0.15%	-9,684	-31.63%	30,616
Garfield	243	18.63%	1,060	81.29%	1	0.08%	-817	-62.65%	1,304
Grant	9,190	26.56%	25,336	73.23%	73	0.21%	-16,146	-46.67%	34,599
Grays Harbor	15,110	41.76%	20,997	58.02%	80	0.22%	-5,887	-16.27%	36,187
Island	26,330	52.14%	24,074	47.67%	99	0.20%	2,256	4.47%	50,503
Jefferson	16,360	67.96%	7,687	31.93%	27	0.11%	8,673	36.03%	24,074
King	730,900	67.87%	344,616	32.00%	1,474	0.14%	386,284	35.87%	1,076,990
Kitsap	81,860	54.44%	68,301	45.42%	213	0.14%	13,559	9.02%	150,374
Kittitas	8,943	35.50%	16,206	64.32%	45	0.18%	-7,263	-28.83%	25,194
Klickitat	5,112	39.52%	7,739	59.83%	85	0.66%	-2,627	-20.31%	12,936
Lewis	12,024	27.68%	31,165	71.73%	258	0.59%	-19,141	-44.06%	43,447
Lincoln	1,274	18.39%	5,642	81.45%	11	0.16%	-4,368	-63.06%	6,927
Mason	15,518	44.08%	19,599	55.68%	85	0.24%	-4,081	-11.59%	35,202
Okanogan	7,371	36.93%	12,538	62.83%	48	0.24%	-5,167	-25.89%	19,957
Pacific	5,747	41.93%	7,885	57.53%	74	0.54%	-2,138	-15.60%	13,706
Pend Oreille	2,184	26.47%	6,050	73.32%	18	0.22%	-3,866	-46.85%	8,252
Pierce	209,423	49.75%	210,804	50.08%	732	0.17%	-1,381	-0.33%	420,959
San Juan	8,770	71.22%	3,517	28.56%	27	0.22%	5,253	42.66%	12,314
Skagit	32,131	48.13%	34,495	51.67%	128	0.19%	-2,364	-3.54%	66,754
Skamania	2,690	38.61%	4,209	60.40%	69	0.99%	-1,519	-21.80%	6,968
Snohomish	209,235	53.08%	184,349	46.77%	613	0.16%	24,886	6.31%	394,197
Spokane	113,724	41.47%	159,989	58.34%	500	0.18%	-46,265	-16.87%	274,213
Stevens	6,371	23.15%	21,105	76.68%	46	0.17%	-14,734	-53.54%	27,522
Thurston	84,851	53.69%	72,860	46.10%	330	0.21%	11,991	7.59%	158,041
Wahkiakum	985	33.44%	1,935	65.68%	26	0.88%	-950	-32.25%	2,946
Walla Walla	11,222	39.36%	17,263	60.55%	24	0.08%	-6,041	-21.19%	28,509
Whatcom	76,452	57.73%	55,808	42.14%	175	0.13%	20,644	15.59%	132,435
Whitman	9,122	47.41%	10,080	52.39%	37	0.19%	-958	-4.98%	19,239
Yakima	31,533	36.86%	53,717	62.80%	288	0.34%	-22,184	-25.93%	85,538
Totals	1,969,936	52.62%	1,765,121	47.15%	8,394	0.22%	204,815	5.47%	3,743,451

Counties that flipped from Democratic to Republican

- Pierce (largest city: Tacoma)
- Skagit (largest city: Mount Vernon)
- Whitman (largest city: Pullman)

==== By congressional district ====
Upthegrove won six of ten congressional districts, with the remaining four going to Herrera Beutler, including two that elected Democrats.

District	Upthegrove	Herrera Beutler	Representative
1st	57%	43%	Suzan DelBene
2nd	56%	44%	Rick Larsen
3rd	42%	57%	Marie Gluesenkamp Perez
4th	34%	66%	Dan Newhouse
5th	39%	61%	Cathy McMorris Rodgers (118th Congress)
5th	39%	61%	Michael Baumgartner (119th Congress)
6th	54%	46%	Derek Kilmer (118th Congress)
6th	54%	46%	Emily Randall (119th Congress)
7th	79%	21%	Pramila Jayapal
8th	46%	54%	Kim Schrier
9th	65%	35%	Adam Smith
10th	53%	47%	Marilyn Strickland

== Notes ==
Partisan clients
