= 2020 Washington Public Lands Commissioner election =

- November 3, 2020
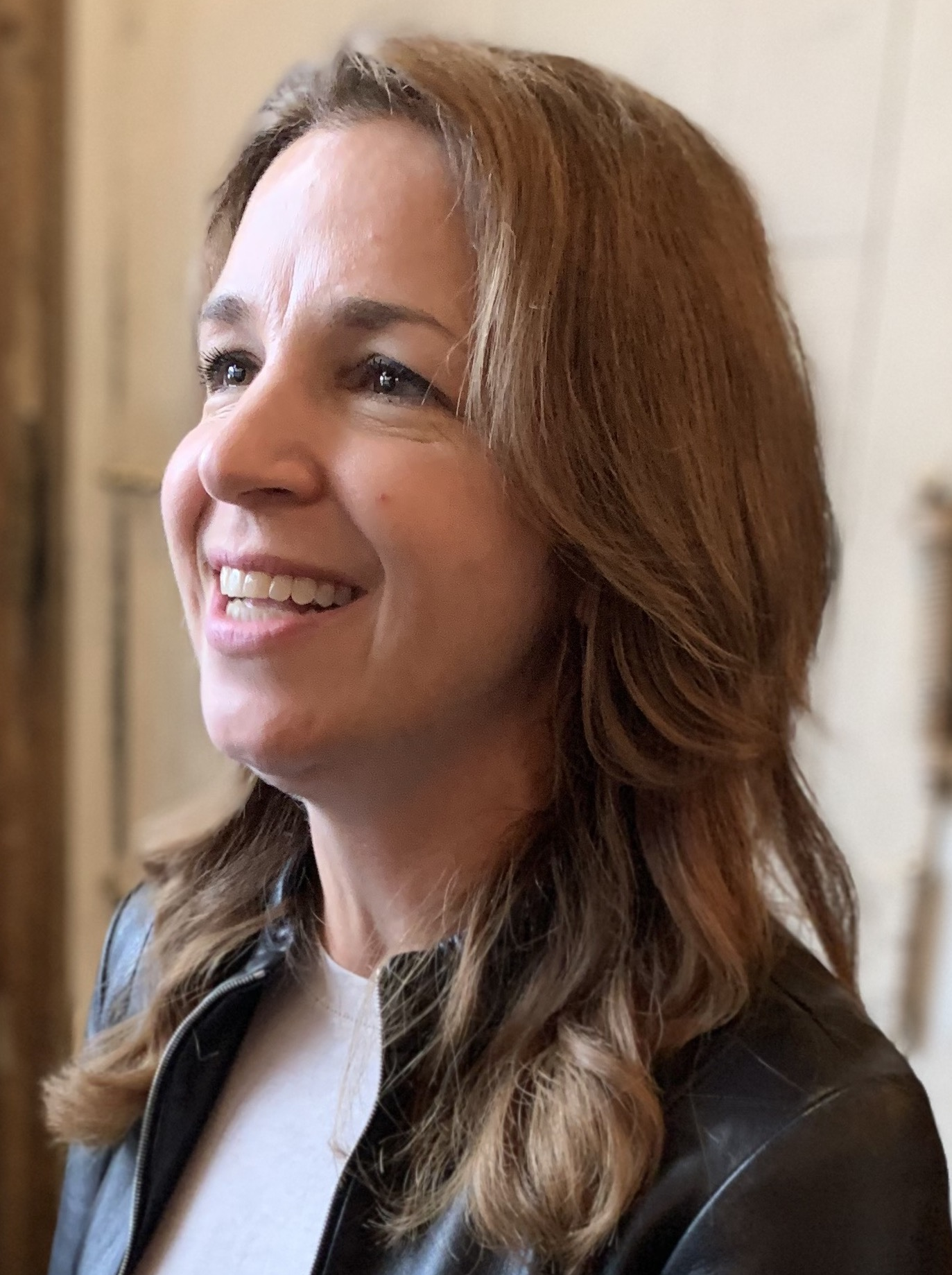

Candidate	Hilary Franz	Sue Kuehl Pederson
Party	Democratic	Republican
Popular vote	2,212,158	1,686,320
Percentage	56.69%	43.21%
- Franz: 40–50% 50–60% 60–70% 70–80% 80–90% Pederson: 50–60% 60–70% 70–80%
Public Lands Commissioner before election
Hilary Franz
Democratic
Elected Public Lands Commissioner
Hilary Franz
Democratic

The 2020 Washington Public Lands Commissioner election was held on November 3, 2020, to elect the Washington Public Lands Commissioner, concurrently with the 2020 U.S. presidential election, as well as elections to the U.S. Senate and various state and local elections, including for U.S. House and governor of Washington. Incumbent Democratic Public Lands Commissioner Hilary Franz was re-elected to a second term in office.

== Background ==
Franz was elected in 2016 against Republican Steve McLaughlin, winning 53% of the vote to succeed fellow Democrat Peter J. Goldmark.

== Candidates ==
Washington is one of two states that holds a top-two primary, meaning that all candidates are listed on the same ballot regardless of party affiliation, and the top two move on to the general election.

=== Democratic Party ===
==== Advanced to general ====
- Hilary Franz, incumbent public lands commissioner (2017–2025)

==== Eliminated in primary ====
- Frank Wallbrown, precinct committee officer

==== Declined ====
- Christine Rolfes, state senator

=== Republican Party ===
==== Advanced to general ====
- Sue Kuehl Pederson, retired utility manager

==== Eliminated in primary ====
- Maryam Abasbarzy
- Steve Sharon, businessman
- Cameron Whitney, planning commissioner of Grand Coulee

=== Libertarian Party ===
==== Eliminated in primary ====
- Kelsey Reyes

== Primary election ==
=== Results ===
County results Franz: 20–30%; 30–40%; 40–50%; 50–60%; 60–70%; Pederson: 20–30%; 30–40%

Congressional district results Franz: 20–30%; 30–40%; 40–50%; 50–60%; 60–70%; 80–90%

Blanket primary results
Party	Candidate	Votes	%
Democratic	Hilary Franz (incumbent)	1,211,310	51.13
Republican	Sue Kuehl Pederson	554,147	23.39
Republican	Cameron Whitney	197,610	8.34
Republican	Steve Sharon	179,714	7.59
Democratic	Frank Wallbrown	122,136	5.16
Libertarian	Kelsey Reyes	77,407	3.27
Republican	Maryam Abasbarzy	24,189	1.02
Write-in		2,504	0.11
Total votes		2,369,017	100.00

Counties that flipped from Democratic to Republican

- Grays Harbor (largest city: Aberdeen)
- Pacific (largest city: Raymond)
- Spokane (largest city: Spokane)

==== By congressional district ====
District	Franz	Pederson	Whitney	Sharon	Wallbrown	Representative
1st	51%	27%	7%	6%	4%	Suzan DelBene
2nd	54%	21%	7%	7%	6%	Rick Larsen
3rd	40%	30%	11%	10%	5%	Jaime Herrera Beutler
4th	29%	28%	18%	15%	5%	Dan Newhouse
5th	36%	26%	15%	12%	5%	Cathy McMorris Rodgers
6th	50%	23%	8%	8%	6%	Derek Kilmer
7th	80%	9%	2%	2%	4%	Pramila Jayapal
8th	44%	30%	9%	8%	4%	Kim Schrier
9th	65%	17%	4%	4%	7%	Adam Smith
10th	48%	27%	7%	7%	6%	Denny Heck

== General election ==
=== Endorsements ===
Hilary Franz (D)

Newspapers

- The Seattle Times

2020 Washington Public Lands Commissioner election debate
No.	Date	Host	Moderator	Link	Democratic	Republican
Key: P Participant A Absent N Not invited I Invited W Withdrawn						
Key: P Participant A Absent N Not invited I Invited W Withdrawn					Hilary Franz	Sue Kuehl Pederson
1	Oct. 2, 2020	The Columbian		YouTube	P	P

=== Polling ===
Poll source	Date(s) administered	Sample size (Note: Key: A – all adults RV – registered voters LV – likely voters V – unclear)	Margin of error	Hilary Franz (D)	Sue Kuehl Pederson (R)	Undecided
Public Policy Polling (D) (Note: Poll sponsored by the Northwest Progressive Institute)	October 14–15, 2020	610 (LV)	± 4%	49%	36%	15%

=== Results ===
2020 Washington Public Lands Commissioner election
Party	Candidate	Votes	%	±%
Democratic	Hilary Franz (incumbent)	2,212,158	56.69%	+3.53%
Republican	Sue Kuehl Pederson	1,686,320	43.21%	–3.63%
Write-in		3,799	0.10%	N/A
Total votes		3,902,277	100.00%	N/A
Democratic hold				

==== By county ====
County results
County	Hilary Franz Democratic		Sue Kuehl Pederson Republican		Write-in Various		Margin		Total votes
County	#	%	#	%	#	%	#	%	Total votes
Adams	1,791	31.81%	3,829	68.00%	11	0.20%	-2,038	-36.19%	5,631
Asotin	4,013	35.32%	7,326	64.48%	22	0.19%	-3,313	-29.16%	11,361
Benton	35,757	36.32%	62,602	63.58%	102	0.10%	-26,845	-27.26%	98,461
Chelan	18,436	44.42%	23,037	55.51%	30	0.07%	-4,601	-11.09%	41,503
Clallam	23,586	49.78%	23,758	50.15%	34	0.07%	-172	-0.36%	47,378
Clark	129,409	49.87%	129,767	50.01%	319	0.12%	-358	-0.14%	259,495
Columbia	652	27.44%	1,720	72.39%	4	0.17%	-1,068	-44.95%	2,376
Cowlitz	22,668	39.38%	34,835	60.52%	52	0.09%	-12,167	-21.14%	57,555
Douglas	7,525	36.75%	12,934	63.16%	19	0.09%	-5,409	-26.41%	20,478
Ferry	1,443	34.30%	2,758	65.56%	6	0.14%	-1,315	-31.26%	4,207
Franklin	12,755	40.69%	18,576	59.25%	19	0.06%	-5,821	-18.57%	31,350
Garfield	359	25.77%	1,032	74.08%	2	0.14%	-673	-48.31%	1,393
Grant	11,288	31.28%	24,766	68.63%	34	0.09%	-13,478	-37.35%	36,088
Grays Harbor	16,612	45.05%	20,232	54.87%	31	0.08%	-3,620	-9.82%	36,875
Island	27,501	53.31%	24,028	46.58%	56	0.11%	3,473	6.73%	51,585
Jefferson	16,608	69.03%	7,437	30.91%	15	0.06%	9,171	38.12%	24,060
King	839,769	72.93%	310,927	27.00%	793	0.07%	528,842	45.93%	1,151,489
Kitsap	84,685	55.64%	67,347	44.25%	175	0.11%	17,338	11.39%	152,207
Kittitas	10,755	42.63%	14,453	57.29%	19	0.08%	-3,698	-14.66%	25,227
Klickitat	5,586	42.97%	7,394	56.88%	19	0.15%	-1,808	-13.91%	12,999
Lewis	13,809	31.64%	29,781	68.24%	53	0.12%	-15,972	-36.60%	43,643
Lincoln	1,606	23.56%	5,203	76.31%	9	0.13%	-3,597	-52.76%	6,818
Mason	16,546	46.36%	19,084	53.47%	59	0.17%	-2,538	-7.11%	35,689
Okanogan	9,312	45.39%	11,179	54.49%	26	0.13%	-1,867	-9.10%	20,517
Pacific	6,474	47.84%	7,033	51.97%	27	0.20%	-559	-4.13%	13,534
Pend Oreille	2,588	31.67%	5,571	68.16%	14	0.17%	-2,983	-36.50%	8,173
Pierce	234,895	52.92%	208,500	46.97%	500	0.11%	26,395	5.95%	443,895
San Juan	9,212	73.12%	3,379	26.82%	8	0.06%	5,833	46.30%	12,599
Skagit	34,832	50.30%	34,317	49.56%	96	0.14%	515	0.74%	69,245
Skamania	2,979	42.27%	4,056	57.56%	12	0.17%	-1,077	-15.28%	7,047
Snohomish	237,530	56.51%	182,461	43.41%	371	0.09%	55,069	13.10%	420,362
Spokane	128,371	45.54%	153,101	54.32%	388	0.14%	-24,730	-8.77%	281,860
Stevens	7,743	28.23%	19,648	71.63%	37	0.13%	-11,905	-43.40%	27,428
Thurston	91,181	56.78%	69,143	43.06%	250	0.16%	22,038	13.72%	160,574
Wahkiakum	1,087	38.25%	1,751	61.61%	4	0.14%	-664	-23.36%	2,842
Walla Walla	12,867	42.77%	17,193	57.15%	25	0.08%	-4,326	-14.38%	30,085
Whatcom	78,948	59.00%	54,775	40.94%	79	0.06%	24,173	18.07%	133,802
Whitman	10,258	50.85%	9,892	49.03%	25	0.12%	366	1.81%	20,175
Yakima	40,722	44.13%	51,495	55.81%	54	0.06%	-10,773	-11.68%	92,271
Totals	2,212,158	56.69%	1,686,320	43.21%	3,799	0.10%	525,838	13.48%	3,902,277

Counties that flipped from Republican to Democratic

- Island (largest city: Oak Harbor)
- Pierce (largest city: Tacoma)
- Skagit (largest city: Mount Vernon)
- Whitman (largest city: Pullman)

==== By congressional district ====
Franz won seven of ten congressional districts.

District	Franz	Kuehl Pederson	Representative
1st	56%	44%	Suzan DelBene
2nd	60%	40%	Rick Larsen
3rd	46%	54%	Jaime Herrera Beutler
4th	39%	61%	Dan Newhouse
5th	43%	57%	Cathy McMorris Rodgers
6th	56%	44%	Derek Kilmer
7th	83%	17%	Pramila Jayapal
8th	50.0%	49.9%	Kim Schrier
9th	71%	28%	Adam Smith
10th	55%	45%	Denny Heck (116th Congress)
10th	55%	45%	Marilyn Strickland (117th Congress)

== Notes ==
Partisan clients
