= Steven Nielson =

Libertarian politician and activist (born 1979)

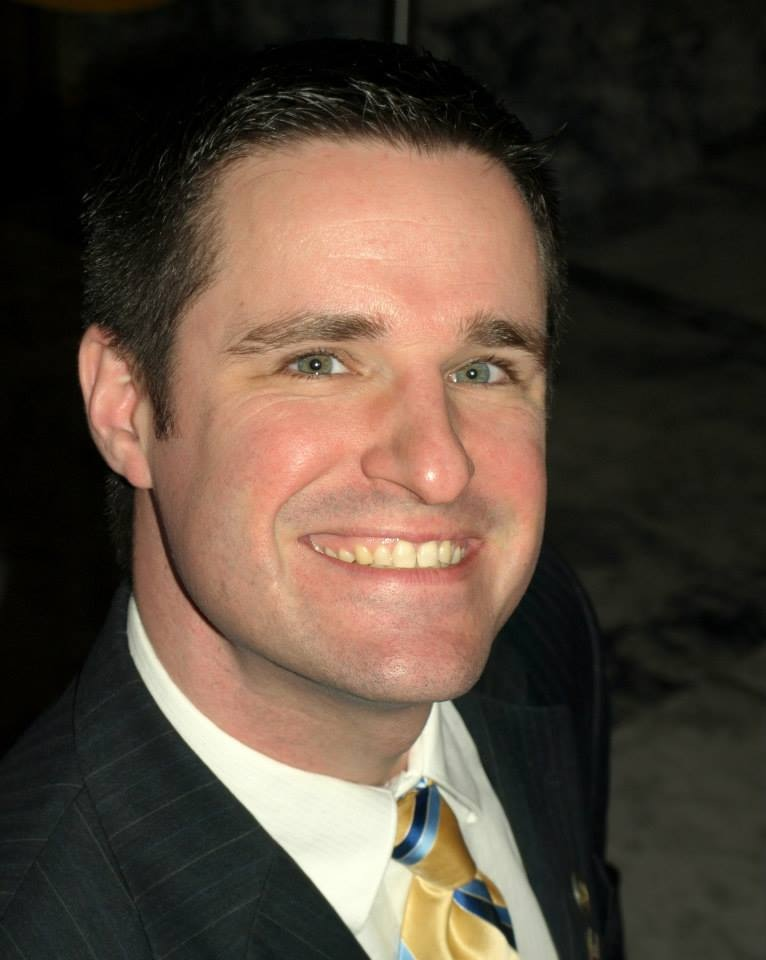
- Steven Nielson – Official Photo

Chairperson of the Washington State Libertarian Party
- In office May 31, 2015 – April 9, 2016

Secretary of the Washington State Libertarian Party
- In office May 31, 2014 – May 29, 2015

Secretary of the Douglas County Republican Party, Colorado
- In office June 1, 2007 – June 30, 2009

Personal details
- Born: Steven Merrill Nielson; September 4, 1979 (age 47) Portland, Oregon, US
- Party: Republican
- Spouse(s): Alicia Kate Nielson (2012–present); Gretchen Dru (2005–2010)
- Children: Sawyer; Isley; Scarlett; Brandt
- Education: University of Washington
- Website: http://www.electnielson.com

Steven Nielson (born September 4, 1979) is an American statesman, small government political activist, a former Libertarian Party officer, astronautical engineer, artist, and children's author.

Nielson was the 2016 Libertarian Candidate for Washington State Public Lands Commissioner, was the 2014 Libertarian candidate for Washington State Representative District 2 Position 2 of the Washington House of Representatives, and the first Libertarian candidate to survive a contested primary challenge since Washington's 2004 adoption of the top-two primary.

== Early life and education ==
Steven Nielson was born on September 4, 1979, to parents Mari Davies and Lloyd Barry Nielson Jr, in Portland, Oregon. Nielson's parents were married only a short period of time and he was subject to several relocations prior to finally settling down with his father in Enumclaw, Washington. He has two brothers and three sisters. Nielson graduated from Enumclaw High School in 1998.

Nielson attended Green River Community College in Auburn, Washington, as an undergraduate, with an emphasis on pre-engineering. In 2000, he was recognized as American Society of Mechanical Engineers (ASME) Student of the Year after leading his college to victory in design innovation competitions.

Nielson attended the University of Washington, where he earned his B.S. in Astronautical Engineering in 2004, with a specific focus in aerospace composite structures. Nielson was heavily involved with education outreach and on-campus politics. He served as advisor for the resident hall student association, vice-president of his residence hall, Hansee Hall, president and founder of the Mars Society at University of Washington, and the president of the American Institute of Aeronautics and Astronautics UW Chapter. He was awarded the Dale and Marjory Myers scholarship for professional potential in the field of aerospace engineering.

== Career ==
Steven Nielson is a professional Quality Assurance Engineer, having worked for Lockheed Martin, Hexcel, and Blue Origin.

While employed with Lockheed, Nielson redefined Foreign Object Debris maturity measures for the corporation and their supply chain. He led quality teams in military satellite assembly, test, and integration. He was selected for his expertise in space composites to assist with early design of the Orion spacecraft within Lockheed Martin where he made significant contributions to the supply chain quality management systems, focusing on development of small/disadvantaged businesses. Nielson ended his career with Lockheed Martin in 2012 after three years of nuclear missile test and fabrication at Naval Submarine Base Bangor.

Nielson joined an advanced composites manufacturing facility in Kent, Washington. Nielson specialized in strategic problem solving and continuous improvement initiatives as a senior member of the Quality Management team.

As a technical member in the Blue Engines business unit, Nielson has been recognized as an innovator in advanced space applications at Blue Origin.

=== Political history ===
Nielson is a noted community leader as early as his high school days, where he used his position as class president to advocate for educational outreach and cross-functional/interdisciplinary education, volunteering throughout his high-school tenure for elementary advisor programs (educational camp), and drug abuse education. Through college, Nielson used his leadership positions to continue educational outreach where he volunteered in elementary settings, teaching science and math to elementary students. Throughout his career Nielson has volunteered for educational outreach programs, such as Advancement Via Individual Determination, and has been a champion for community involvement in the education system. On campus, Nielson was a leader for student's rights, challenging the then University Smoking Ban at the University of Washington.

Nielson began volunteering for the Republican Party in 2004, in Santa Clara county. In 2006, he was appointed and re-elected as the Secretary of the Republican Party in Douglas County, Colorado. During this time Nielson was heavily involved in the presidential campaigns of Tom Tancredo and Mike Huckabee. Nielson graduated from the Leadership Program of the Rockies in 2008 where he was first introduced in-depth to Libertarian philosophies. Nielson's political involvement earned him a coveted question to the presidential candidates in the first YouTube/CNN Republican debates, in Florida.

Upon returning to Washington State, Nielson was sought for chairman of the Kitsap County Republicans, but refused in order to focus on other political activism. In 2010, Nielson was elected as Precinct Committee Officer for the Republican Party in Ridgetop 149 precinct but left the Republican Party shortly after to officially join ranks with the Libertarian Party in early 2011.

In early 2014, Nielson accepted a request from the Libertarian Party of Washington to explore a campaign as a Libertarian for the state legislature. On May 31, 2014, Nielson was unanimously nominated by the state party to represent the party in the race for State Representative in Washington's 2nd Legislative District, challenging Republican Incumbent and House Floor Minority Leader JT Wilcox. A third contender entered the race on the final day of filing from the Democratic Party, Rick Payne. Despite attempting to register as a "Marijuana Party Democrat", Payne's official party preference from the Secretary of State's office indicated "Prefers Marijuana Party." Nielson received 21% of the total vote in the primary, defeating the Democrat for Marijuana candidate and advancing to the general election. Nielson went on to finish the general election with 28.13% of the final vote.

Nielson was the first Libertarian candidate to survive a contested primary election following Washington's adoption of Initiative 872 in 2004.

Nielson became an appointed member of the Civil Service and Parks Commissions in Orting, WA in 2014 where he was unanimously elected as the co-chair of the dual commissions. He has used this position to refurbish and rededicate the town's Veteran's Memorial, designing and executing the city project under all-volunteer labor and private donations. Prior to this activity the memorial lay in disrepair for over a decade.

In 2015, Nielson penned several initiatives to the people, most notably the Make Every Vote Count initiative, aimed at reforming Washington State Electoral College. He was both applauded and criticized for seeking deep multiparty support for the reform.

Libertarians should not be criticised for seeking alternative support for initiatives that better the political representation of all voters in the state of Washington. I, as a Libertarian, am not beholden to traditional party affiliations, and I remind those who seek to criticize that Libertarians and our solutions have a broad based appeal across the entire political spectrum. The success of our initiatives in 2015 will be evidence of the viablity of our leadership and ability to work with all political affiliations.

Nielson became chairman of the Libertarian Party of Washington State in 2015 and pledged to serve one term on a platform of party growth and candidate recruitment. He successfully recruited several local candidates in local 2015 races and added five election victories for the Libertarian Party. Nielson built a team to successfully recruit 35 candidates for office in 2016, aimed at helping the Libertarian Party attain Major Party status. His efforts have been identified as a Libertarian case study for candidate achievement by the Libertarian Leadership Academy, and he has been nominated for recognition for the National Libertarian Party Patrick Henry Award, recognizing achievement in libertarian campaigns.

On March 15, 2016, Nielson announced candidacy for Commissioner of Public Lands for the State of Washington.

=== Libertarian Campaign for Public Lands ===
Nielson ran the campaign for Commissioner of Public Lands in a pro-investment, small government, business innovation manner. His adherence to state portfolio diversification was adopted by all seven candidates in the race. He was the only candidate proposing an agro-industrial investment by the state in industrial hemp futures to 'literally grow' Washington's economy.

I believe 100 percent of DNR lands should be aside for business purposes. Lands set aside as preserves should be traded to state parks. That would leave DNR focused on creating a steady revenue source for schools and reducing the burden to the taxpayer.

Nielson finished the race in 5th place in the blanket primary receiving just over 61,000 votes statewide, amounting to 4.85% of the total votes.

=== The Gary Johnson / Bill Weld Convention Controversy and Ballot Access in Washington State ===
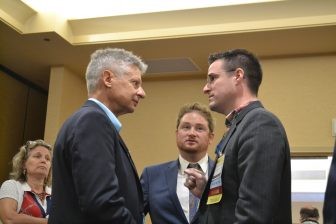
Gary Johnson and Steven Nielson discuss Bill Weld as Johnson's VP pick

At the 2016 Libertarian National Convention Steven Nielson lost confidence in the recommended running mate to presumptive nominee Gary Johnson, William Weld, after a poor debate performance and a mixture of words with the former Massachusetts governor. As a national delegate, Nielson confronted Gary Johnson ahead of balloting to inquire as to the nature of the Johnson/Weld ticket. The meeting, intended to be a private exchange of words, resulted in an intense five-minute dialogue which was captured by documentarians and journalists.

"I know the camera's are on, I didn't want to do this," Nielson said, motioning to me and the news cameras and documentary film crew in the room.

Despite the differences identified at the convention, Nielson was identified as the multi-convention chairman who submitted Johnson and Weld's names to the Secretary of State's election division for ballot access. Volunteers from around the state successfully gathered enough signatures to gain ballot access in Washington State for the Libertarian ticket by the August 5, 2016 deadline.

== Political philosophy ==
=== Pragmatic minarchism ===
Nielson advocates pragmatism in his application of libertarian policy. He recognizes the ultimate direction and acknowledges the ultimate goals of the libertarian movement, however, he identifies as a measure of success the ability to realize the end state through incrementalism.

=== Government accountability ===
In early 2016 Nielson was a key factor in the resignation of a Republican State Legislator who had come under fire for allegedly exaggerating his military service during his campaign. Nielson provided written evidence to news sources detailing exaggerated acts of valor, and publicly called for resignation of elected officials who do not meet high ethical standards.

"We ought to hold our elected representatives to the highest ethical standards and I believe that misrepresenting your military record not only violates the honor of the service, but it dishonors the integrity of the very office he holds," Nielson said in a news release.

=== Education choice ===
Nielson advocates for competitive choice and competitive curriculum in education, including charter schools and homeschooling as alternates to the public school model. He interprets the Washington State Supreme Court McCleary decision as to support a reorganization of the public education system prior to applying a 'fully funded' standard. He justifies the position based on the acknowledgment of the court of the Doran decision in 1980, and suggesting that simply providing funds was an insufficient solution. Nielson recommends a comprehensive restructure of the Washington State school system, including allowances for early apprenticeship graduation after 10th grade with sufficient requirements, competitive curriculum targeting students based on aptitude instead of common core, and competitive compensation for educators based on ability instead of tenure.

=== Taxation ===
In his 2014 campaign for state representative, Nielson led a statewide effort against the proposed gas tax increase included with the state's transportation package. Nielson is generally opposed to taxation on property and income and affirms the libertarian belief that taxation is a form of theft. As such, Nielson has advocated for significant reductions to taxation, opposes state and federal income tax, and supports taxation only where required to provide basic government services. He proposes significant reduction to government expenditures and a heavy reliance on ingenuity of the free market to replace the government oversights and expenditures.

=== Foreign policy ===
Nielson is critical of neoconservatives like former U.S. Senator John McCain and their push for an aggressive, interventionist foreign policy. He is an advocate for nuclear arms reduction and identifies nuclear arms as a relic of human history. He supports closure of all unnecessary foreign bases and advocates for an end to foreign wars.

So long as the American Government continues to conduct arms deals with nations who turn those weapons against us, and so long as the American Government continues a failed policy of perpetual warfare without declaration to do so, I see no justification in providing funding to that segment of the government that makes war. I have more respect for the lives of the men and women who choose a career in defense of this nation," Nielson said in a press release.

=== Technology ===
Nielson has been a long time political advocate favoring the human advancement of technology with the goal of a permanent presence in space.

== Political associations ==
=== Republican Party ===
While in voluntary service with the Republican Party, Nielson assisted organizational efforts of the presidential campaign of Mike Huckabee in the state of Colorado.

- Nielson was actively engaged in local campaign organization, structure, and policy.
- He served as the Secretary of the Douglas County Republican Party, Douglas County Colorado, 2006–2009
- He was elected as the Precinct Committee Officer for Ridgetop 149, Kitsap County Washington, 2010
- He served as Precinct Committee Officer in Gig Harbor precinct 26-324 from 2019 to 2026. Serving as Secretary of the 26th Legislative District in Pierce County Republican Party from 2024 to 2026.

=== Libertarian Party ===
At the May 2014 Washington State Liberty Summit, the LPWA Annual Convention, Steven Nielson was nominated and unanimously elected as the state party secretary. Under revised constitution and bylaws enacted at the same convention, the term of this and all officer posts was limited to one year with no term limits. Nielson was instrumental in the reformation of the Libertarian Party of Washington and was responsible for drafting changes associated with the restructure at the time. Nielson successfully scripted and orchestrated the proceedings of the convention business session, rallying opposition activists in the manner in which to vote to enact the sought after changes.

- Upon election, he served as secretary of the Libertarian Party of Washington State, 2014–2015
- Following his term as secretary, he served as the Chairman of the Libertarian Party of Washington State, 2015–2016
- He was elected as a delegate to the National Libertarian Party Convention, 2016
- He was elected as a presidential elector for the Washington State Libertarian Party, 2016
- He served as the alternate regional representative to the National Libertarian Party on the Libertarian National Committee, 2016–2018

== Personal life ==
Nielson married Gretchen Spindler in 2005 in Pierce County, Washington. They had two daughters together, Sawyer and Isley. Citing irreconcilable differences, they separated and divorced in 2011. Nielson remarried in 2012 to educator Alicia K. Hope in Maui County, Hawaii. They have two children together, Scarlett and Brandt. The family resides in Gig Harbor, Washington.

== See also ==
- Washington State Legislature
- Washington state legislative districts
- Washington House of Representatives
- Washington House of Representatives elections, 2014
