= Dave Upthegrove =

American politician

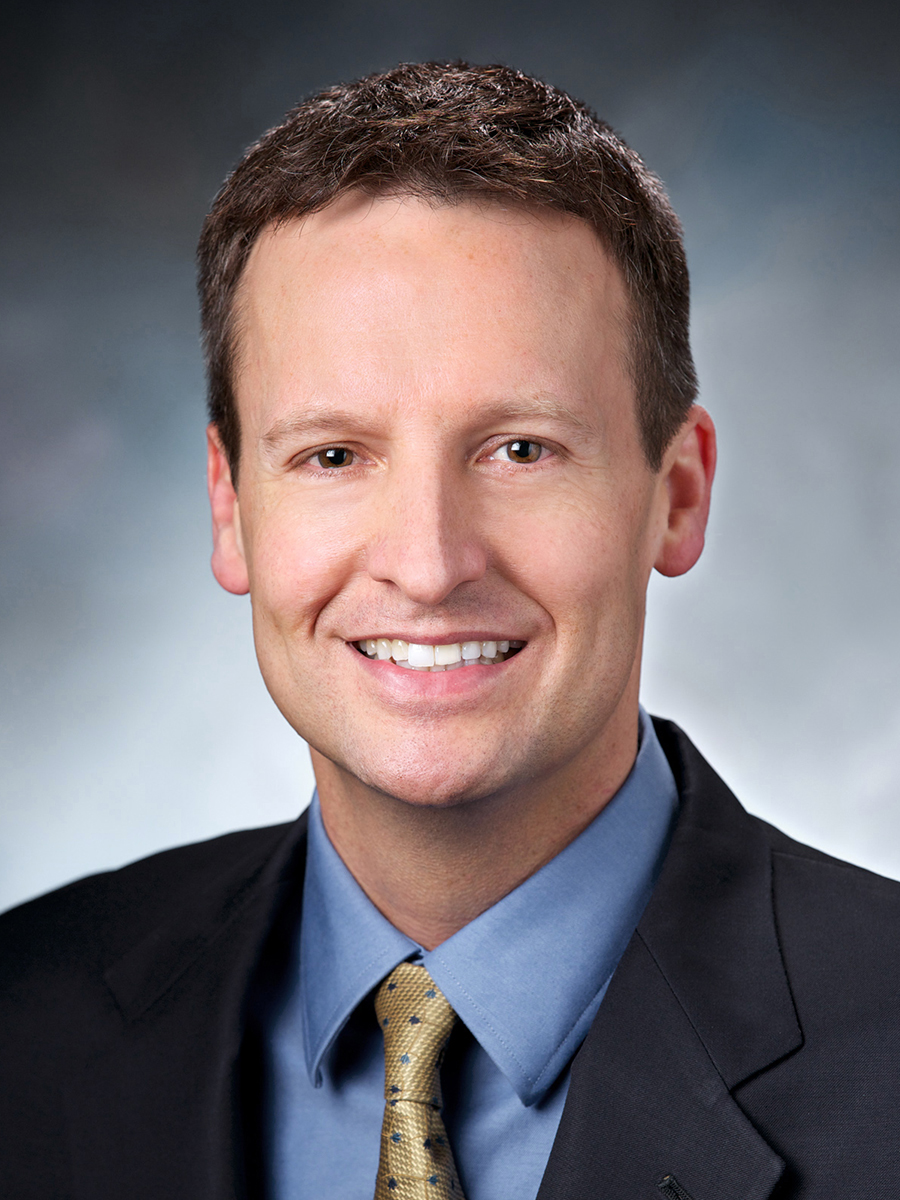
- Upthegrove in 2013

17th Public Lands Commissioner of Washington
- Incumbent
- Assumed office January 15, 2025
- Governor: Bob Ferguson
- Preceded by: Hilary Franz

Member of King County Council from the 5th district
- In office January 1, 2014 – January 15, 2025
- Preceded by: Julia Patterson
- Succeeded by: De'Sean Quinn

Member of the Washington House of Representatives from the 33rd district
- In office January 7, 2002 – December 15, 2013
- Preceded by: Karen Keiser
- Succeeded by: Mia Gregerson

Personal details
- Born: David Paul Upthegrove; May 3, 1971 (age 55) Burien, Washington, U.S.
- Party: Democratic
- Spouse: Chad
- Education: University of Colorado, Boulder (BA); University of Idaho (GrCert)

David Paul Upthegrove (born May 3, 1971) is an American politician who is currently serving as the 17th Washington State Commissioner of Public Lands since 2025. He previously was a member of the King County Council, representing the 5th district from 2014 to 2025. A member of the Democratic Party, he was a member of the Washington House of Representatives, representing the 33rd district from 2002 to 2013.

== Early life and education ==
Dave Upthegrove is a descendant of the German Op den Graeff family of Dutch origin. He is a direct descendant of Herman op den Graeff, Mennonite leader of Krefeld, and his grandson Abraham op den Graeff, one of the founders of Germantown and in 1688, signer of the first protest against slavery in colonial America.

Dave Upthegrove was born and raised in King County, Washington, and attended Lakeside School in Seattle. He earned a Bachelor of Arts degree in environmental conservation from the University of Colorado Boulder and a graduate certificate in energy policy planning from the University of Idaho.

== Career ==
Upthegrove was appointed to the Washington House of Representatives in January 2002 and was elected to a two-year term in November 2002. He was then re-elected at two-year intervals until running for King County Council.

While serving in the Washington House of Representatives, Upthegrove was chair of the Environment Committee and also served on the Local Government and Transportation Committee. He is a former chair of the Select Committee on Puget Sound. He has been involved in education policy, sponsoring and passing legislation to improve the teaching of civics and to better meet the needs of recent immigrant students. The Washington Conservation Voters called Upthegrove "a leader on environmental issues and a rising star in the House." Upthegrove led high-profile environmental initiatives to clean up Puget Sound and to clean up soil at schools and day cares contaminated by a local Asarco copper smelter.

Upthegrove was elected to the King County Council in 2013 from District 5, which encompasses the southern suburbs of Seattle, including SeaTac, Kent, and Des Moines. He replaced Julia Patterson, a three-term incumbent who decided not to run for a fourth term. Upthegrove was appointed to the Sound Transit Board in January 2014.

After unsuccessfully running for Washington State Commissioner of Public Lands with The Seattle Times' endorsement in 2016, Upthegrove was elected to that office in 2024, beating Republican candidate Jaime Herrera Beutler in the closest statewide race of the year.

== Personal life ==
Upthegrove and his husband, Chad, live in Des Moines, Washington.

Political offices
Preceded by Hilary Franz	Public Lands Commissioner of Washington; 2025–present	Incumbent
