= 2020 Washington gubernatorial election =

- November 3, 2020
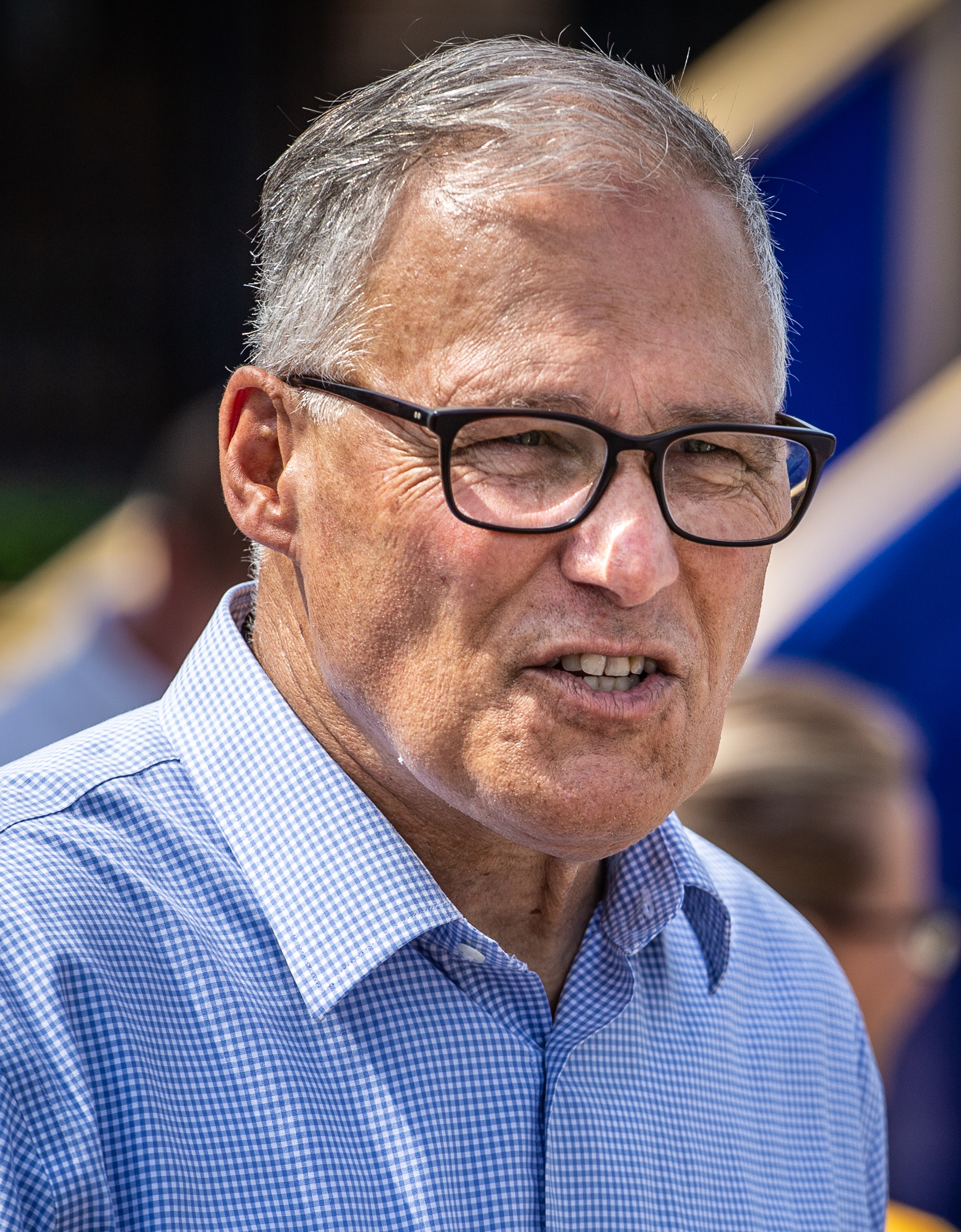

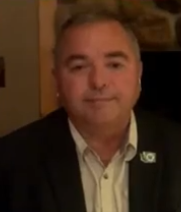
Candidate	Jay Inslee	Loren Culp
Party	Democratic	Republican
Popular vote	2,294,243	1,749,066
Percentage	56.56%	43.12%
- Inslee: 40–50% 50–60% 60–70% 70–80% 80–90% >90% Culp: 40–50% 50–60% 60–70% 70–80% 80–90% >90% Tie: 40–50% 50% No data
Governor before election
Jay Inslee
Democratic
Elected Governor
Jay Inslee
Democratic

The 2020 Washington gubernatorial election was held on November 3, 2020. It followed a top-two primary held on August 4. Incumbent Governor Jay Inslee, the Democratic candidate, defeated Loren Culp, the Republican candidate by a wide margin. Inslee, who was eligible to run for a third term due to the lack of gubernatorial term limits, initially launched a campaign for president of the United States in the 2020 election. When he dropped out of that race in August 2019 due to extremely low polling numbers, he announced he would seek a third term as governor. Several other Democratic political figures considered entering the race if Inslee did not run, including Washington Attorney General Bob Ferguson; no other major Democratic candidates entered the race. Republican Loren Culp, the police chief of Republic, Washington, placed second in the top-two primary and advanced to the general election alongside Inslee.

The election was clear and decisive, with Inslee winning re-election over Culp by over 13 points. This marked the largest margin of victory in a Washington gubernatorial race since Gary Locke won reelection in 2000. Inslee's landslide victory included him winning over 74% of the vote in King County, the highest for a Democratic gubernatorial candidate in the county's history. King County, home to Seattle, has about a third of the state's voters. In addition, Inslee became the first Democratic gubernatorial candidate since the aforementioned Locke in 2000 to win any county in Eastern Washington, namely Whitman County, home to Washington State University. Culp still ran ahead of the top-ticket presidential candidate, Donald Trump, by about four points.

Despite the margin of victory, Culp refused to concede and filed a lawsuit against Republican Washington Secretary of State Kim Wyman five weeks after the election. He did not give a concession speech, while making claims of irregularities which Wyman characterized as "unsubstantiated". Culp's actions drew criticism and were compared to Donald Trump's refusal to concede the 2020 U.S. presidential election.

This election marked the tenth consecutive victory of the Democratic candidate for governor of Washington.

== Background ==
Washington had not had a Republican governor since John Spellman left office in 1985, the longest streak of Democratic leadership of any state in the country and the third longest streak of one-party leadership after South Dakota (which had not had a Democratic governor since Harvey L. Wollman left office in 1979) and Utah (which had not had a Democratic governor since Scott M. Matheson left office nine days prior to Spellman in 1985). Incumbent Governor Jay Inslee, who previously served in the U.S. House, was first elected to the governorship in the 2012 election and won reelection in 2016.

When Inslee announced his candidacy for president, several political figures expressed interest in running for Governor if Inslee won the Democratic primaries. These included Attorney General Bob Ferguson, Commissioner of Public Lands Hilary Franz and King County Executive Dow Constantine. They stated they would only run if Inslee did not, avoiding a primary challenge.

Several Republican politicians announced their own campaigns to challenge Inslee, including businessman Anton Sakharov, Republic police chief Loren Culp, and state senator Phil Fortunato. However, speculated candidates such as former U.S. Representative Dave Reichert, former Seattle Port Commissioner and 2016 gubernatorial candidate Bill Bryant, Pierce County Executive and former state senator Bruce Dammeier, and state House Minority Leader J. T. Wilcox, all declined to be candidates, leaving no prominent Republicans to challenge Inslee, which was seen as a necessary prerequisite to mount a formidable challenge to him.

== Primary election ==
Washington is one of two states that holds a top-two primary, meaning that all candidates are listed on the same ballot regardless of party affiliation, and the top two move on to the general election. Most states have party primaries.

=== Democratic candidates ===
==== Advanced to the general election ====
- Jay Inslee, incumbent governor of Washington and candidate for president of the United States in 2020

==== Declined ====
- Dow Constantine, King County Executive
- Bob Ferguson, Washington Attorney General (ran for reelection, endorsed Inslee)
- Hilary Franz, Washington Commissioner of Public Lands (ran for reelection, endorsed Inslee)

=== Republican candidates ===
==== Advanced to the general election ====
- Loren Culp, police chief of Republic, U.S. Army veteran

==== Eliminated in the primary ====
- Tim Eyman, activist and initiative promoter
- Phil Fortunato, state senator
- Joshua Freed, former mayor of Bothell
- Raul Garcia, emergency room physician
- Nate Herzog, former Lake Forest Park city councilman
- Anton Sakharov, program manager

==== Declined ====
- Bill Bryant, former Seattle Port Commissioner and candidate for governor in 2016
- Bruce Dammeier, Pierce County Executive (ran for reelection)
- Doug Ericksen, state senator
- Drew MacEwen, state representative (running for reelection)
- Dori Monson, radio personality
- Dave Reichert, former U.S. Representative for Washington's 8th congressional district
- Drew Stokesbary, state representative (running for reelection)
- J. T. Wilcox, minority leader of the Washington House of Representatives (running for reelection)

=== Green Party ===
==== Eliminated in the primary ====
- Liz Hallock, attorney

=== Independents ===
==== Eliminated in the primary ====
- Cregan Newhouse, City of Seattle Consumer Protection Division acting manager and former public television director

==== Withdrew ====
- Asa Palagi, U.S. Army officer and businessman

=== Endorsements ===
Jay Inslee (D)

Statewide officials

- Bob Ferguson, Washington Attorney General
- Hilary Franz, Washington State Commissioner of Public Lands

Local officials

- Lorena González, Seattle City Councilor

Newspapers

- The Seattle Times
Raul Garcia (R)

U.S. senators

- Slade Gorton, former U.S. senator from Washington

Statewide officials

- Daniel J. Evans, former governor of Washington
- Rob McKenna, former Washington Attorney General
- Sam Reed, former Washington Secretary of State

=== Polling ===
Poll source	Date(s) administered	Sample size (Note: Key: A – all adults RV – registered voters LV – likely voters V – unclear)	Margin of error	Jay Inslee (D)	Loren Culp (R)	Tim Eyman (R)	Phil Fortunato (R)	Joshua Freed (R)	Raul Garcia (R)	Anton Sakharov (R)	Other / Undecided
SurveyUSA	July 22–27, 2020	513 (LV)	± 5.4%	55%	9%	8%	3%	–	6%	4%	16% (Note: "Some other candidate" with 4%; Undecided with 12%)
Crosscut/Elway	July 11–15, 2020	402 (RV)	± 5.0%	46%	14%	4%	2%	–	5%	6%	25% (Note: "Other" with 1%; Undecided with 24%)
SurveyUSA	May 16–19, 2020	650 (LV)	± 5.6%	50%	4%	8%	6%	6%	2%	1%	23% (Note: Undecided with 23%)
SurveyUSA	January 26–28, 2020	1,103 (RV)	± 3.9%	39%	5%	11%	4%	4%	–	3%	34% (Note: Undecided with 34%)
Crosscut/Elway	December 26–29, 2019	405 (RV)	± 5%	46%	4%	7% (Note: Listed as an independent.)	4%	5%	–	–	34% (Note: Undecided with 34%)

Hypothetical polling

with Bryant, Constantine, Ferguson, and Franz

Poll source	Date(s) administered	Sample size (Note: Key: A – all adults RV – registered voters LV – likely voters V – unclear)	Margin of error	Bill Bryant (R)	Dow Constantine (D)	Bob Ferguson (D)	Hilary Franz (D)	Undecided
Chism Strategies (D)	March 8–10, 2019	400 (LV)	± 4.9%	46%	6%	25%	2%	21%

=== Results ===
County results Inslee: 20–30%; 30–40%; 40–50%; 50–60%; 60–70%; 70–80%; Culp: 20–30%; 30–40%; 40–50%; 50–60%; Garcia: 20–30%; 30–40%

Congressional district results Inslee: 30–40%; 40–50%; 50–60%; 60–70%; 80–90%; Culp: 20–30%

Top-two primary election results
Party	Candidate	Votes	%
Democratic	Jay Inslee (incumbent)	1,247,916	50.14%
Republican	Loren Culp	433,238	17.41%
Republican	Joshua Freed	222,553	8.94%
Republican	Tim Eyman	159,495	6.41%
Republican	Raul Garcia	135,045	5.43%
Republican	Phil Fortunato	99,265	3.99%
Democratic	Don L. Rivers	25,601	1.03%
Trump Republican Party	Leon Lawson	23,073	0.93%
Green	Liz Hallock	21,537	0.87%
Democratic	Cairo D'Almeida	14,657	0.59%
Trump Republican Party	Anton Sakharov	13,935	0.56%
Pre2016 Republican Party	Nate Herzog	11,303	0.45%
Democratic	Gene Hart	10,605	0.43%
Democratic	Omari Tahir Garrett	8,751	0.35%
Unaffiliated Party	Ryan Ryals	6,264	0.25%
Socialist Workers	Henry Clay Dennison	5,970	0.24%
Trump Republican Party	Goodspaceguy	5,646	0.23%
Republican	Richard L. Carpenter	4,962	0.2%
Independent	Elaina J. Gonzales	4,772	0.19%
Republican	Matthew Murray	4,489	0.18%
Independent	Thor Amundson	3,638	0.15%
Republican	Bill Hirt	2,854	0.11%
Republican	Martin L. Wheeler	2,686	0.11%
Republican	Ian Gonzales	2,537	0.1%
New-Liberty Party	Joshua Wolf	2,315	0.09%
No Party Preference	Cregan M. Newhouse	2,291	0.09%
No Party Preference	Brian R. Weed	2,178	0.09%
StandupAmerica Party	Alex Tsimerman	1,721	0.07%
Republican	Tylor Grow	1,509	0.06%
Independent	Dylan B. Nails	1,470	0.06%
Independent	Craig Campbell	1,178	0.05%
American Patriot Party	William Miller	1,148	0.05%
No Party Preference	Cameron M. Vessey	718	0.03%
Propertarianist Party	Winston Wilkes	702	0.03%
Fifth Republic Party	David W. Blomstrom	519	0.02%
Cascadia Labour Party	David Voltz	480	0.02%
Write-in		1,938	0.08%
Total votes		2,488,959	100.00%

==== By congressional district ====
District	Inslee	Culp	Freed	Eyman	Garcia	Representative
1st	49%	17%	14%	6%	4%	Suzan DelBene
2nd	53%	17%	9%	6%	3%	Rick Larsen
3rd	39%	28%	7%	9%	3%	Jaime Herrera Beutler
4th	27%	29%	9%	8%	16%	Dan Newhouse
5th	37%	19%	11%	7%	12%	Cathy McMorris Rodgers
6th	50%	19%	7%	7%	4%	Derek Kilmer
7th	80%	2%	5%	3%	3%	Pramila Jayapal
8th	41%	21%	12%	7%	5%	Kim Schrier
9th	66%	5%	8%	5%	4%	Adam Smith
10th	47%	20%	9%	7%	4%	Denny Heck

== General election ==
=== Debates ===
- Complete video of debate, October 7, 2020 - C-SPAN

=== Predictions ===
Source	Ranking	As of
The Cook Political Report	Safe D	October 23, 2020
Inside Elections	Safe D	October 28, 2020
Sabato's Crystal Ball	Safe D	November 2, 2020
Politico	Safe D	November 2, 2020
Daily Kos	Safe D	October 28, 2020
RCP	Safe D	November 2, 2020
270towin	Safe D	November 2, 2020

=== Post-primary endorsements ===
Jay Inslee (D)

U.S vice presidents

- Joe Biden, 47th Vice President of the United States and 2020 Democratic nominee for President

State legislators

- Chris Vance, former state representative, former King County Councilmember, and former chair of the Washington State Republican Party (Independent, former Republican)

Newspapers

- The Columbian
- The Everett Herald
- The News Tribune
- The Olympian
- The Spokesman-Review
- The Stranger
- Tri-City Herald
- Walla Walla Union-Bulletin
- Yakima Herald-Republic

=== Polling ===
View source data.

Poll source	Date(s) administered	Sample size	Margin of error	Jay Inslee (D)	Loren Culp (R)	Undecided
Swayable	October 23 – November 1, 2020	474 (LV)	± 6%	59%	41%	–
Public Policy Polling (D) (Note: This poll was sponsored by the Northwest Progressive Institute)	October 14–15, 2020	615 (LV)	± 4%	56%	40%	4%
SurveyUSA	October 8–10, 2020	591 (LV)	± 5.2%	54%	40%	6%
Strategies 360	September 8–14, 2020	501 (RV)	± 4.4%	53%	37%	9% (Note: Includes "Refused")
SurveyUSA	July 22–27, 2020	534 (LV)	± 5.2%	61%	32%	7%
SurveyUSA	May 16–19, 2020	530 (LV)	± 5.4%	56%	31%	13%

Hypothetical polling

Jay Inslee vs. Tim Eyman

Poll source	Date(s) administered	Sample size	Margin of error	Jay Inslee (D)	Tim Eyman (R)	Undecided
SurveyUSA	July 22–27, 2020	534 (LV)	± 5.2%	62%	31%	7%
SurveyUSA	May 16–19, 2020	530 (LV)	± 5.4%	60%	31%	9%

Jay Inslee vs. Phil Fortunato

Poll source	Date(s) administered	Sample size	Margin of error	Jay Inslee (D)	Phil Fortunato (R)	Undecided
SurveyUSA	July 22–27, 2020	534 (LV)	± 5.2%	61%	32%	8%
SurveyUSA	May 16–19, 2020	530 (LV)	± 5.4%	56%	34%	10%

Jay Inslee vs. Joshua Freed

Poll source	Date(s) administered	Sample size	Margin of error	Jay Inslee (D)	Joshua Freed (R)	Undecided
SurveyUSA	July 22–27, 2020	534 (LV)	± 5.2%	60%	31%	9%
SurveyUSA	May 16–19, 2020	530 (LV)	± 5.4%	57%	30%	13%

Jay Inslee vs. Raul Garcia

Poll source	Date(s) administered	Sample size	Margin of error	Jay Inslee (D)	Raul Garcia (R)	Undecided
SurveyUSA	July 22–27, 2020	534 (LV)	± 5.2%	60%	32%	8%

=== Results ===
2020 Washington gubernatorial election
Party	Candidate	Votes	%	±%
Democratic	Jay Inslee (incumbent)	2,294,243	56.56%	+2.31%
Republican	Loren Culp	1,749,066	43.12%	−2.37%
Write-in		13,145	0.32%	+0.06%
Total votes		4,056,454	100.00%	N/A
Democratic hold				

==== By county ====
County results
County	Jay Inslee Democratic		Loren Culp Republican		Write-in Various		Margin		Total votes
County	#	%	#	%	#	%	#	%	Total votes
Adams	1,655	28.34%	4,170	71.40%	15	0.26%	-2,515	-43.07%	5,840
Asotin	4,212	35.49%	7,627	64.26%	30	0.25%	-3,415	-28.77%	11,869
Benton	36,939	36.03%	65,170	63.57%	410	0.40%	-28,231	-27.54%	102,519
Chelan	17,922	41.63%	24,936	57.93%	188	0.44%	-7,014	-16.29%	43,046
Clallam	24,366	49.64%	24,640	50.20%	82	0.17%	-274	-0.56%	49,088
Clark	138,196	50.83%	132,984	48.91%	715	0.26%	5,212	1.92%	271,895
Columbia	652	26.34%	1,819	73.49%	4	0.16%	-1,167	-47.15%	2,475
Cowlitz	22,213	37.11%	37,453	62.57%	193	0.32%	-15,240	-25.46%	59,859
Douglas	7,176	33.81%	13,958	65.77%	90	0.42%	-6,782	-31.95%	21,224
Ferry	1,345	30.79%	3,000	68.68%	23	0.53%	-1,655	-37.89%	4,368
Franklin	12,803	39.53%	19,488	60.17%	96	0.30%	-6,685	-20.64%	32,387
Garfield	349	23.61%	1,118	75.64%	11	0.74%	-769	-52.03%	1,478
Grant	10,772	28.71%	26,645	71.00%	109	0.29%	-15,873	-42.30%	37,526
Grays Harbor	16,502	43.08%	21,686	56.61%	119	0.31%	-5,184	-13.53%	38,307
Island	28,239	52.75%	25,145	46.97%	153	0.29%	3,094	5.78%	53,537
Jefferson	16,992	68.79%	7,651	30.97%	59	0.24%	9,341	37.81%	24,702
King	887,374	74.07%	307,022	25.63%	3,653	0.30%	580,352	48.44%	1,198,049
Kitsap	87,766	55.69%	69,288	43.97%	530	0.34%	18,478	11.73%	157,584
Kittitas	10,529	40.21%	15,567	59.45%	87	0.33%	-5,038	-19.24%	26,183
Klickitat	5,693	42.31%	7,735	57.49%	27	0.20%	-2,042	-15.18%	13,455
Lewis	13,821	30.54%	31,306	69.19%	122	0.27%	-17,485	-38.64%	45,249
Lincoln	1,526	21.79%	5,450	77.83%	26	0.37%	-3,924	-56.04%	7,002
Mason	16,502	44.40%	20,562	55.32%	104	0.28%	-4,060	-10.92%	37,168
Okanogan	8,298	39.15%	12,843	60.59%	54	0.25%	-4,545	-21.44%	21,195
Pacific	6,514	46.47%	7,463	53.24%	41	0.29%	-949	-6.77%	14,018
Pend Oreille	2,513	29.55%	5,959	70.08%	31	0.36%	-3,446	-40.53%	8,503
Pierce	238,097	51.68%	220,904	47.95%	1,730	0.38%	17,193	3.73%	460,731
San Juan	9,621	73.39%	3,465	26.43%	23	0.18%	6,156	46.96%	13,109
Skagit	36,444	49.87%	36,404	49.81%	231	0.32%	40	0.05%	73,079
Skamania	3,129	43.10%	4,116	56.69%	15	0.21%	-987	-13.60%	7,260
Snohomish	244,876	56.13%	189,797	43.50%	1,607	0.37%	55,079	12.62%	436,280
Spokane	131,734	44.82%	161,138	54.82%	1,053	0.36%	-29,404	-10.00%	293,925
Stevens	7,393	26.06%	20,902	73.67%	76	0.27%	-13,509	-47.62%	28,371
Thurston	93,723	56.19%	72,506	43.47%	571	0.34%	21,217	12.72%	166,800
Wahkiakum	1,102	37.10%	1,862	62.69%	6	0.20%	-760	-25.59%	2,970
Walla Walla	13,305	42.93%	17,590	56.76%	94	0.30%	-4,285	-13.83%	30,989
Whatcom	81,992	59.44%	55,544	40.27%	399	0.29%	26,448	19.17%	137,935
Whitman	10,806	51.62%	10,056	48.04%	72	0.34%	750	3.58%	20,934
Yakima	41,152	43.07%	54,097	56.62%	296	0.31%	-12,945	-13.55%	95,545
Totals	2,294,243	56.56%	1,749,066	43.12%	13,145	0.32%	545,177	13.44%	4,056,454

Counties that flipped from Republican to Democratic

- Clark (largest city: Vancouver)
- Skagit (largest city: Mount Vernon)
- Whitman (largest city: Pullman)

==== By congressional district ====
Inslee won six of ten congressional districts, with the remaining four going to Culp, including one that elected a Democrat.

District	Inslee	Culp	Representative
1st	56.43%	43.2%	Suzan DelBene
2nd	60.12%	39.55%	Rick Larsen
3rd	45.75%	53.98%	Jaime Herrera Beutler
4th	37.48%	62.18%	Dan Newhouse
5th	42.54%	57.11%	Cathy McMorris Rodgers
6th	55.66%	44.02%	Derek Kilmer
7th	84.56%	15.16%	Pramila Jayapal
8th	49.11%	50.55%	Kim Schrier
9th	72.73%	26.97%	Adam Smith
10th	54.25%	45.38%	Denny Heck (116th Congress)
10th	54.25%	45.38%	Marilyn Strickland (117th Congress)
