= Building Industry Association of Washington =

Trade association

Logo of the Building Industry Association of Washington

The Building Industry Association of Washington or BIAW is a Washington State section 501(c)(6) non-profit organization formed in 1966 to represent the housing industry in the state of Washington. The largest trade organization in Washington State, BIAW's membership comprises about 8,000 member companies, home builders, trade contractors, suppliers and industry professionals.

== Programs ==
BIAW maintains a for profit arm, BIAW Member Services Corporation (BIAW-MSC) is a wholly owned for-profit subsidiary of BIAW formed in 1993. Their largest program, ROII Select, a Department of Labor and Industries' Retrospective Rating Program, known as Return on Industrial Insurance Program or Retro. Through Retro, participating employers can recover a portion of their workers' compensation premiums if they are able to reduce injury rates and lower associated claim costs. Of the 40-some Retro programs in the state, BIAW has the largest.

Additional program offerings from BIAW and BIAW MSC include education, health insurance, legal assistance, and the Building Industry Insurance Program.

== Campaign financing ==
The BIAW uses PACs to fund various campaigns. BIAW has several PACs including the Washington Affordable Housing Council, "It's Time for a Change" and "Walking for Washington". The same legal contact information appears for all BIAW PACs.

The BIAW has given funds to its local affiliates including the Master Builders Association of King and Snohomish Counties, and the Home Builders Association of Kitsap County.
