= Hilary Franz =

American politician (born 1970)

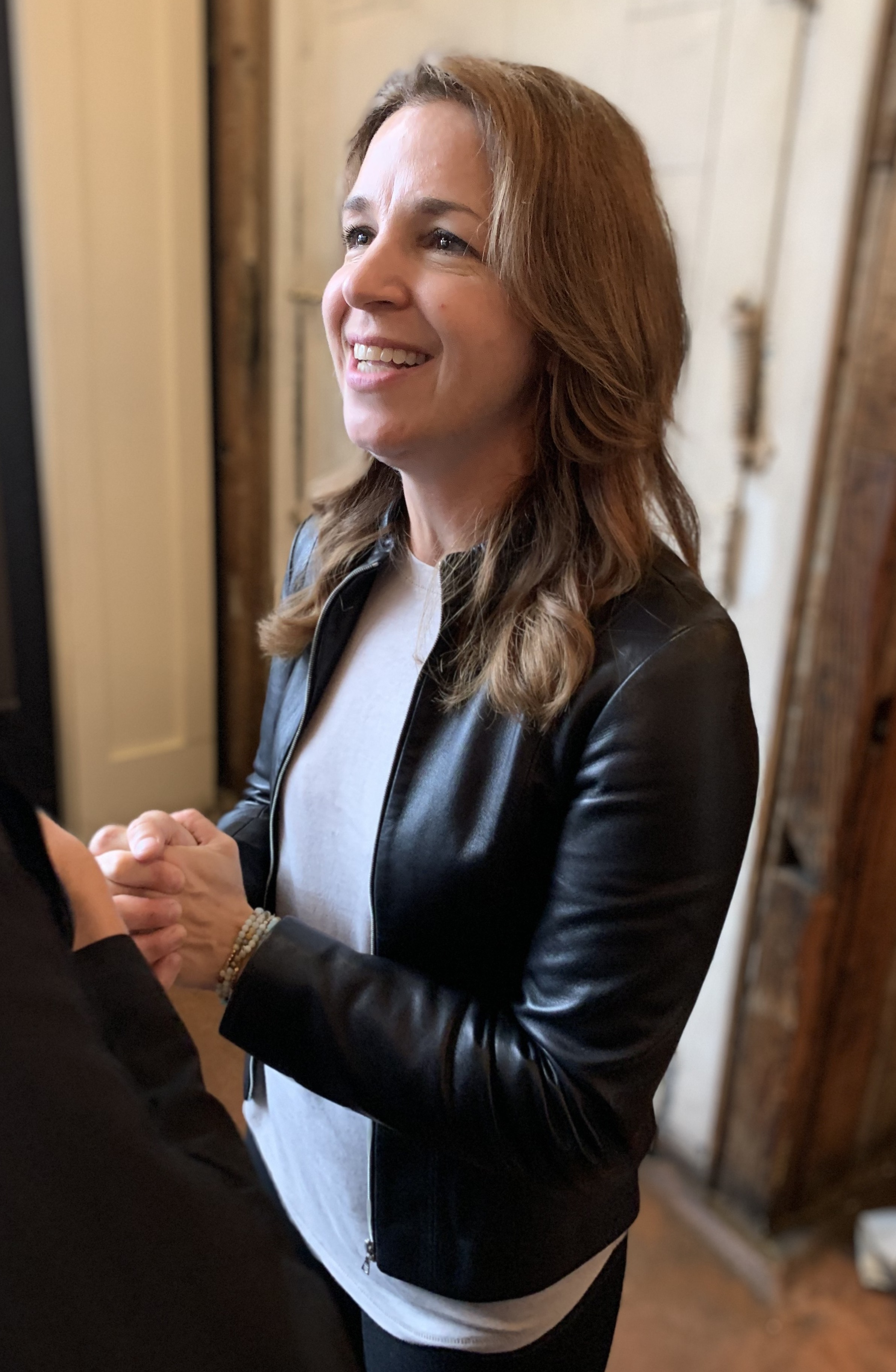

16th Public Lands Commissioner of Washington
- In office January 11, 2017 – January 15, 2025
- Governor: Jay Inslee
- Preceded by: Peter J. Goldmark
- Succeeded by: Dave Upthegrove

Personal details
- Born: July 3, 1970 (age 56)
- Party: Democratic
- Children: 3
- Education: Smith College (BA); Northeastern University (JD)

Hilary S. Franz (born July 3, 1970) is an American politician and conservation attorney who previously served as the 16th Washington State Commissioner of Public Lands from 2017 to 2025. She is a member of the Democratic Party who was previously a member of the Bainbridge Island City Council and was elected as commissioner in 2016. She currently serves as President and CEO of American Forests.

== Early life and education ==
Franz was born in the Pacific Northwest and raised in the area, graduating from St. Mary's Academy in Portland, Oregon, in 1988. She was a competitive ice skater for twelve years as a child and teenager, frequenting the same ice rinks as future Olympian Tonya Harding. Franz graduated from Smith College with a bachelor's degree in English language and government in 1992 and the Northeastern University School of Law with a juris doctor. She practiced as an attorney in the Seattle area from 1997 to 2011, specializing in environmental law and conservation.

== Political career ==
Franz was elected to the Bainbridge Island city council in 2008 and served one term, during which she lobbied the state government for the establishment of the area's first open water marina at Eagle Harbor. After briefly considering a run for the Washington State House of Representatives, Franz joined Seattle-based conservation organization Futurewise as its director. She served on several regional conservation and land management boards, including committees of the Puget Sound Regional Council.

Franz announced her intention to run for State Commissioner of Public Lands in April 2016, looking to fill the seat of retiring commissioner Peter J. Goldmark. She received the early endorsement of Goldmark, as well as former King County Executive Ron Sims and the Bullitt Center. Franz finished second overall during the primary election, advancing to the general election alongside Republican candidate Steve McLaughlin and ahead of seven other Democrats. With the further endorsements of two former governors, U.S. Senator Patty Murray, and a coalition of environmental groups and unions, Franz won 53 percent of the vote in the general election but failed to win any counties in Eastern Washington.

Franz was sworn in as Commissioner of Public Lands on January 11, 2017. During the first year of her term, the Department of Natural Resources faced a minor wildfire season caused by prolonged heat similar to those of previous years. The state government prepared a new forest management plan to reduce the effectiveness of future wildfires by introducing new restoration measures and prescribed burns in Eastern Washington to thin out overgrown forests.

On August 19, 2017, a fish farm near Cypress Island in Skagit County accidentally released hundreds of thousands of Atlantic salmon. Franz ordered an investigation into the farm and announced that the farm would be removed for various violations of its state license and lease agreement. Franz was also part of the state government's effort to halt federal plans for offshore drilling in the Pacific Ocean near the Olympic Peninsula.

The 2018 wildfire season was more severe than the previous year and prompted the state government to declare a state of emergency after the Department of Natural Resources had been overwhelmed in its response to 891 fires by late July. The season had 1,850 recorded fires, setting a new state record, and Franz issued a request to the state legislature for a $55 million budget to expand the department's fire-fighting resources. Franz proposed the hiring of 30 full-time wildland firefighters, the purchase of two helicopters, and the creation of a fire-training academy specifically for wildfires.

Under Franz, logging on DNR lands was allowed to increase in order to raise revenue for local government needs, which drew criticism from conservationists. A proposed sale of timber from Capitol State Forest in 2020 was reduced by the DNR after the discovery of old growth trees included in the sale.

Franz was re-elected Commissioner of Public Lands in 2020, defeating Sue Kuehl Pederson in the general election with 57% of the vote.

=== 2024 U.S. House campaign ===
On May 10, 2023, Franz announced her campaign for Washington governor in the upcoming 2024 election. She had previously expressed interest in running in the 2020 election, but incumbent governor Jay Inslee had decided to run for a third term. Franz withdrew from the race on November 10 to run for the United States House of Representatives in the 6th district, a day after incumbent Derek Kilmer announced he was not seeking re-election in the 2024 election. Kilmer immediately endorsed her. Franz finished third in the primary election and did not advance to the general election; she conceded on August 8. Franz attributed her loss to heavy spending from out-of-state donors and political action committees that supported her Democratic opponent, state Senator Emily Randall.

== Personal life ==
Franz has three sons and lived on a farm in Bainbridge Island prior to being elected as commissioner. She lives in Grays Harbor County.

Political offices
Preceded by Peter J. Goldmark	Public Lands Commissioner of Washington; 2017–2025	Succeeded by Dave Upthegrove
