= 2016 Washington Public Lands Commissioner election =

- November 8, 2016
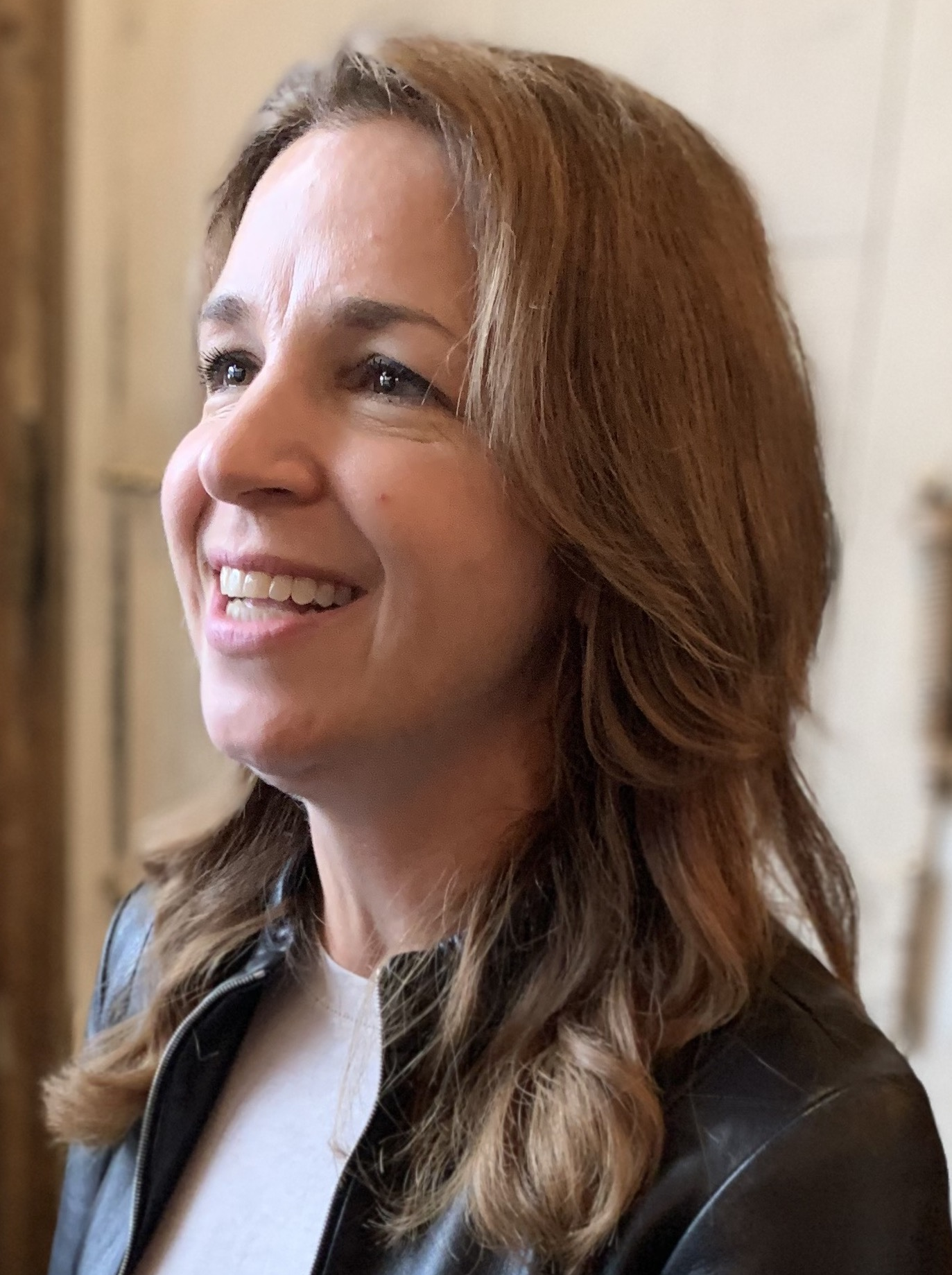

Candidate	Hilary Franz	Steve McLaughlin
Party	Democratic	Republican
Popular vote	1,630,369	1,436,817
Percentage	53.16%	46.84%
- Franz: 50–60% 60–70% 80–90% McLaughlin: 50–60% 60–70% 70–80%
Public Lands Commissioner before election
Peter J. Goldmark
Democratic
Elected Public Lands Commissioner
Hilary Franz
Democratic

The 2016 Washington Public Lands Commissioner election was held on November 8, 2016, to elect the Washington Public Lands Commissioner, concurrently with the 2016 U.S. presidential election, as well as elections to the U.S. Senate and various state and local elections, including for U.S. House and governor of Washington.

Incumbent Democratic Public Lands Commissioner Peter J. Goldmark retired. Democratic conservation attorney Hilary Franz defeated Republican Steve McLaughlin to succeed Goldmark.

== Background ==
Golmark was first elected in 2008, defeating then-incumbent public lands commissioner Doug Sutherland. He retired after serving two terms.

== Candidates ==
Washington is one of two states that holds a top-two primary, meaning that all candidates are listed on the same ballot regardless of party affiliation, and the top two move on to the general election.

=== Democratic Party ===
==== Advanced to general ====
- Hilary Franz, conservation attorney and former Bainbridge Island city councilor

==== Eliminated in primary ====
- Karen Porterfield, nominee of Washington's 8th congressional district in 2012
- John Stillings, former competitive rower
- Dave Upthegrove, King County Councilor
- Mary Verner, former mayor of Spokane

==== Declined ====
- Peter J. Goldmark, incumbent public lands commissioner (2009–2017)

=== Republican Party ===
==== Advanced to general ====
- Steve McLaughlin, retired United States Navy Commander

=== Libertarian Party ===
==== Eliminated in primary ====
- Steven Nielson, former chairman of the Libertarian Party of Washington

== Primary election ==
=== Endorsements ===
Dave Upthegrove (D)

Newspapers

- The Seattle Times

=== Results ===
Five Democrats, one Republican, and one Libertarian competed in the primary. Steve McLaughlin (R) and Hilary Franz (D) finished as the top two and advanced to the general election.

County results McLaughlin: 30–40%; 40–50%; 50–60%; 60–70%; Franz: 20–30%; 30–40%

Congressional district results McLaughlin: 30–40%; 40–50%; 60–70%; Franz: 30–40%; 40–50%

Blanket primary results
Party	Candidate	Votes	%
Republican	Steve McLaughlin	494,416	37.95
Democratic	Hilary Franz	297,074	22.80
Democratic	Dave Upthegrove	183,976	14.12
Democratic	Mary Verner	159,564	12.25
Libertarian	Steven Nielson	63,056	4.84
Democratic	Karen Porterfield	61,710	4.74
Democratic	John Stillings	43,129	3.31
Total votes		1,302,925	100.00

Combined partisan vote by county Democratic: 40–50%; 50–60%; 60–70%; 70–80%; Republican: 40–50%; 50–60%; 60–70%

Combined partisan vote by congressional district Democratic: 40–50%; 50–60%; 70–80%; 80–90%; Republican: 40–50%; 60–70%

Counties that flipped from Democratic to Republican

- Cowlitz (largest city: Longview)
- Mason (largest city: Shelton)

Counties that flipped from Republican to Democratic

- Clallam (largest city: Port Angeles)
- Clark (largest city: Vancouver)
- Skagit (largest city: Mount Vernon)
- Spokane (largest city: Spokane)

==== By congressional district ====
District	Franz	McLaughlin	Upthegrove	Verner	Representative
1st	22%	40%	15%	11%	Suzan DelBene
2nd	23%	36%	14%	13%	Rick Larsen
3rd	16%	49%	8%	10%	Jaime Herrera Beutler
4th	11%	61%	5%	9%	Dan Newhouse
5th	9%	50%	5%	25%	Cathy McMorris Rodgers
6th	22%	38%	13%	12%	Derek Kilmer
7th	46%	13%	24%	9%	Jim McDermott
8th	17%	46%	14%	10%	Dave Reichert
9th	31%	25%	23%	11%	Adam Smith
10th	19%	38%	17%	12%	Denny Heck

== General election ==
=== Post-primary endorsements ===
Hilary Franz (D)

Newspapers

- The Seattle Times

=== Polling ===
Poll source	Date(s) administered	Sample size	Margin of error	Hilary Franz (D)	Steve McLaughlin (R)	Undecided
Elway Poll	October 20–22, 2016	502 (RV)	± 4.5%	36%	31%	33%
Elway Poll	August 9–13, 2016	500 (RV)	± 4.5%	33%	32%	35%

=== Results ===
2016 Washington Public Lands Commissioner election
Party	Candidate	Votes	%	±%
Democratic	Hilary Franz	1,630,369	53.16%	–5.58%
Republican	Steve McLaughlin	1,436,817	46.84%	+5.58%
Total votes		3,067,186	100.00%	N/A
Democratic hold				

==== By county ====
County results
County	Hilary Franz Democratic		Steve McLaughlin Republican		Margin		Total votes
County	#	%	#	%	#	%	Total votes
Adams	1,234	27.64%	3,230	72.36%	-1,996	-44.71%	4,464
Asotin	3,170	34.08%	6,131	65.92%	-2,961	-31.84%	9,301
Benton	24,734	31.85%	52,916	68.15%	-28,182	-36.29%	77,650
Chelan	11,780	36.93%	20,118	63.07%	-8,338	-26.14%	31,898
Clallam	17,198	45.64%	20,480	54.36%	-3,282	-8.71%	37,678
Clark	91,651	47.90%	99,706	52.10%	-8,055	-4.21%	191,357
Columbia	496	24.00%	1,571	76.00%	-1,075	-52.01%	2,067
Cowlitz	18,012	41.47%	25,418	58.53%	-7,406	-17.05%	43,430
Douglas	4,467	29.90%	10,471	70.10%	-6,004	-40.19%	14,938
Ferry	1,084	31.44%	2,364	68.56%	-1,280	-37.12%	3,448
Franklin	8,196	35.31%	15,015	64.69%	-6,819	-29.38%	23,211
Garfield	250	21.28%	925	78.72%	-675	-57.45%	1,175
Grant	7,536	27.56%	19,808	72.44%	-12,272	-44.88%	27,344
Grays Harbor	12,215	44.47%	15,255	55.53%	-3,040	-11.07%	27,470
Island	20,223	48.89%	21,145	51.11%	-922	-2.23%	41,368
Jefferson	12,680	64.38%	7,015	35.62%	5,665	28.76%	19,695
King	648,376	69.25%	287,877	30.75%	360,499	38.50%	936,253
Kitsap	61,344	50.94%	59,070	49.06%	2,274	1.89%	120,414
Kittitas	6,822	37.58%	11,333	62.42%	-4,511	-24.85%	18,155
Klickitat	4,126	39.97%	6,196	60.03%	-2,070	-20.05%	10,322
Lewis	9,564	28.89%	23,545	71.11%	-13,981	-42.23%	33,109
Lincoln	1,117	20.18%	4,417	79.82%	-3,300	-59.63%	5,534
Mason	12,015	44.48%	15,000	55.52%	-2,985	-11.05%	27,015
Okanogan	6,064	36.65%	10,481	63.35%	-4,417	-26.70%	16,545
Pacific	4,576	45.02%	5,589	54.98%	-1,013	-9.97%	10,165
Pend Oreille	1,958	29.59%	4,659	70.41%	-2,701	-40.82%	6,617
Pierce	164,672	49.35%	169,007	50.65%	-4,335	-1.30%	333,679
San Juan	7,075	68.49%	3,255	31.51%	3,820	36.98%	10,330
Skagit	25,529	47.10%	28,667	52.90%	-3,138	-5.79%	54,196
Skamania	2,248	41.92%	3,115	58.08%	-867	-16.17%	5,363
Snohomish	172,034	51.90%	159,412	48.10%	12,622	3.81%	331,446
Spokane	89,715	40.64%	131,038	59.36%	-41,323	-18.72%	220,753
Stevens	5,815	26.25%	16,334	73.75%	-10,519	-47.49%	22,149
Thurston	67,195	53.84%	57,619	46.16%	9,576	7.67%	124,814
Wahkiakum	826	37.75%	1,362	62.25%	-536	-24.50%	2,188
Walla Walla	8,995	37.03%	15,299	62.97%	-6,304	-25.95%	24,294
Whatcom	58,346	55.16%	47,436	44.84%	10,910	10.31%	105,782
Whitman	7,565	45.46%	9,075	54.54%	-1,510	-9.07%	16,640
Yakima	29,466	39.33%	45,463	60.67%	-15,997	-21.35%	74,929
Totals	1,630,369	53.16%	1,436,817	46.84%	193,552	6.31%	3,067,186

Counties that flipped from Democratic to Republican

- Clallam (largest city: Port Angeles)
- Clark (largest city: Vancouver)
- Cowlitz (largest city: Longview)
- Grays Harbor (largest city: Aberdeen)
- Island (largest city: Oak Harbor)
- Mason (largest city: Shelton)
- Pacific (largest city: Raymond)
- Pierce (largest city: Tacoma)
- Skagit (largest city: Mount Vernon)
- Skamania (largest city: Carson)
- Spokane (largest city: Spokane)
- Wahkiakum (largest city: Puget Island)
- Whitman (largest city: Pullman)

==== By congressional district ====
Franz won six of ten congressional districts.

District	Franz	McLaughlin	Representative
1st	51%	49%	Suzan DelBene
2nd	56%	44%	Rick Larsen
3rd	44%	56%	Jaime Herrera Beutler
4th	34%	66%	Dan Newhouse
5th	39%	61%	Cathy McMorris Rodgers
6th	52%	48%	Derek Kilmer
7th	80%	20%	Jim McDermott
7th	80%	20%	Pramila Jayapal
8th	46%	54%	Dave Reichert
9th	68%	32%	Adam Smith
10th	52%	48%	Denny Heck
