= Master Builders Association of King and Snohomish Counties =

The Master Builders Association of King and Snohomish Counties (MBAKS) is a trade association of homebuilders, remodelers and associated businesses in the state of Washington. The association is the oldest and largest of the National Association of Home Builders more than 800 local home builders associations.

MBAKS was founded in 1909 by a group of Seattle builders who saw the need to promote and protect the viability of the housing industry.

MBAKS lobbies for environmental policies. MBAKS worked with King and Snohomish counties to create the Built Green program, a residential building program that emphasizes environmentalism.

MBAKS promotes continuing education to keep its membership current with the latest building innovations and safety procedures. The association also provides scholarships and training for students interested in pursuing a career in the industry.

MBAKS has two charitable foundations: Master Builders Care Foundation, which supports community projects and groups offering transitional housing and shelters; and Master Builders Career Connection, which provides scholarships and training for the residential construction trades.

MBAKS is a sponsor of the annual Seattle Home Show and Seattle Home Show 2. The home show was started in 1939 as a way to showcase the housing industry and promote home sales during the Great Depression.
