= Paul Berendt =

American politician

Paul Berendt served as chairman of the Washington State Democratic Party from January 1995 to January 2006. He was the longest serving state Democratic Party chairman in the nation at the time he stepped down from his post.

Active in the Democratic National Committee, Berendt served as Vice Chair for the West of the Association of State Democratic Chairs and as a member of the DNC's Credentials Committee.

During Berendt's tenure as chairman, Democrat Christine Gregoire became governor after a heavily fought election. She won the election by 129 votes after three counts and multiple lawsuits.

Additionally, the state Democratic Party, along with the Republicans and Libertarians, sued and overturned the state's former blanket primary election system after the United States Supreme Court found California's similar system unconstitutional in California Democratic Party v. Jones. They also successfully fought the implementation of a Louisiana-style "top two" primary, in which the top two vote-getters, regardless of party, would advance to the general election.

During Berendt's tenure, Washington State Democrats had the best record of any state party in the nation of getting Democratic candidates elected, including US Senator Maria Cantwell. Democrats also won four Congressional seats plus majorities in both houses of the Washington State Legislature.

Under Berendt's leadership, Washington became the only state in US history to elect two women senators and a woman governor. During his tenure, Washington had the most women serving in the state legislature of any state.

The party has developed a larger, more complex staff organization which includes professional database, Web design, fundraising, field, and compliance professionals, as well as a one-of-a-kind voter file database. It is the only state voter file that can be accessed by grassroots precinct workers.

The grassroots of the party has been rebuilt resulting in the addition of thousands of precinct committee workers to its membership in the past decade.

Paul Berendt is now Senior Vice President at Strategies 360, a Seattle-based strategic communications firm.
