= Washington State Department of Natural Resources =

State agency managing state trust lands

Department overview
- Formed: 1957; 69 years ago
- Preceding agencies: Washington State Division of Forestry; Washington State Department of Conservation and Development; Washington State Land Department
- Type: Environmental agency
- Jurisdiction: State of Washington
- Headquarters: Natural Resources Building 1111 Washington Street SE Olympia, Washington; 47.0373103°N 122.8977029°W
- Employees: 1,900 permanent (2024); 900 seasonal (2024)
- Annual budget: $557 million (2024)
- Department executive: Dave Upthegrove, Commissioner of Public Lands
- Website: dnr.wa.gov

The Washington State Department of Natural Resources (DNR) manages over 3,000,000 acres (12,000 km^{2}) of forest, range, agricultural, and commercial lands in the U.S. state of Washington. The DNR also manages 2,600,000 acres (11,000 km^{2}) of aquatic areas, which include shorelines, tidelands, lands under Puget Sound and the coast, and navigable lakes and rivers. Its regions of jurisdiction include eight Upland Regions and three Aquatic Districts. Part of the DNR's management responsibility includes monitoring of mining cleanup, environmental restoration, providing scientific information about earthquakes, landslides, and ecologically sensitive areas. DNR also works towards conservation, in the form of Aquatic Reserves such as Maury Island and in the form of Natural Area Preserves like Mima Mounds or Natural Resource Conservation Areas like Woodard Bay Natural Resource Conservation Area.

The department was created in 1957 to manage around 2.5 million acres of state trust lands for the people of Washington. DNR management of state-owned forests, farms, rangeland, aquatic, and commercial lands generates more than $200 million in annual revenue for public schools, state government institutions, and county services. It does so by harvesting timber on trust lands and later selling it through public auctions. The currently largest trust managed is for K-12 schools, with around 1.7 million acres of land assigned to it. DNR is also Washington's largest firefighting force, with more than 1,500 firefighters who control wildland fires for more than 13 million acres of private and state-owned forest lands. Other sources of funds for the department's activities are forestry, federal grants designated for specific purposes – many of which are wildfire combating measures – and leasing or auctioning off aquatic land for geoduck harvesting.

== Commissioner of Public Lands ==
The head of DNR is an elected constitutional officer known as the "Commissioner of Public Lands", and is paid an annual salary of $171,765.

Fifteen individuals have served the State of Washington as Commissioner of Public Lands, two of whom (Taylor and Case) served non-consecutive terms. Otto A. Case also served as Washington State Treasurer from 1933–1937 and 1941–1945. The Commissioner of Public Lands is seventh in the line of succession to the office of Governor of Washington, immediately after the Superintendent of Public Instruction. The current Commissioner of Public Lands is Dave Upthegrove, who was elected on November 5, 2024.

The longest-serving Commissioner of Public Lands is Bert Cole, who served 24 years from 1957 to 1981 and the second longest-serving Commissioner of Public Lands is Bryan Boyle, who served 12 years from 1981 to 1993.

	Name	Party	Dates Served
1	William T. Forrest	Republican	1889–1897
2	Robert Bridges	Populist	1897–1901
3	S.A. Callvert	Republican	1901–1905
4	E.W. Ross	Republican	1905–1913
5	Clark V. Savidge	Republican	1913–1933
6	A.C. Martin	Democratic	1933–1941
7, 9	Jack Taylor	Democratic	1941–1945; 1949–1953
8, 10	Otto A. Case	Democratic	1945–1949; 1953–1957
11	Bert Cole	Democratic	1957–1981
12	Brian Boyle	Republican	1981–1993
13	Jennifer Belcher	Democratic	1993–2001
14	Doug Sutherland	Republican	2001–2009
15	Peter J. Goldmark	Democratic	2009–2017
16	Hilary Franz	Democratic	2017–2025
17	Dave Upthegrove	Democratic	2025–present

== Divisions ==
- Aquatic Resources
- Conservation, Recreation, and Transactions
- Engineering and General Services
- Financial Management
- Forest Practices
- Forest Resources
- Geology and Earth Resources (often abbreviated as "DGER")
- Human Resources
- Information Technology
- Product Sales and Leasing
- Wildland Fire Management

== Management of public lands ==
=== Aquatic reserves ===
The Department of Natural Resources has established aquatic reserves throughout the state to protect important native ecosystems on state-owned aquatic lands. Through its aquatic reserves, DNR promotes the preservation, restoration, and enhancement of state-owned aquatic lands that are of special educational, scientific, or environmental interest. Managing aquatic reserves does not affect private or other adjacent land ownership.

== Law enforcement ==
The DNR employs approximately 15 law enforcement officers, who are stationed throughout the state. These officers patrol lands owned or managed by the DNR. DNR officers are full-authority law enforcement officers while they are on DNR lands. Under state law, DNR officers are considered to be limited authority law enforcement officers, as their state law enforcement authority is only applicable on lands owned by or under the jurisdiction of the DNR. The majority of county sheriffs in Washington have commissioned all of their local DNR officers as county deputies, allowing them to exercise full authority as law enforcement officers throughout the county, not only on DNR lands. DNR officers are dispatched by the Washington State Patrol.

== Tribal relations ==
The DNR established government-to-government relations with the federally recognized tribal governments in Washington state in the late 20th century. The Centennial Accord of 1989, the Millennium Agreement of 1999, and the Commissioner's Order on Tribal Relations in 2010 all outline the agency's policies for consultation with tribal governments. Annual summits between the DNR and tribal governments are held to resolve conflicts of interests between tribes and the agency.

== Natural hazards ==
The DNR maintains a portal with natural hazard information for the public including tsunamis; landslides and earthquakes; volcanoes and lahars; and "mineral hazards" (asbestos, heavy metals and naturally occurring uranium, and radon gas) in the State of Washington.

Its responsibilities of land management and protection also include planning and funding response to wildfires within Washington. Since 2016 specifically, measures were passed to develop the DNR's involvement in wildfire combating. HB 2376 in 2017 would fund the DNR with $215,000 to create a 20-Year Forest Health Strategic Plan for forestland treatment, to expand the department's system of assessing and treating lands, among other things. Following legislation in the coming years, the DNR put forth the so-called 10-Year Plan in 2019, which created distinct goals, such as improving wildfire preparedness and recovery systems or strengthening land, and was set to receive $500 million across 8 years as decided by House Bill 1168, passed in 2021. In more recent endeavours, Dave Upthegrove appealed to the state Legislature for an additional $104.8 million in wildfire response funding, considering both decreasing subsidies from WA state itself and federal funding cuts for organisations like the US Forest Service under the Trump administration.

In 2025, the agency partnered with Pano AI to enable access to 21 live, panoramic cameras throughout the state in wildfire-prone areas; the video streams are available for public view online.
