= 2012 United States House of Representatives elections in Washington =

- November 6, 2012

All 10 Washington seats in the United States House of Representatives
| | Majority party | Minority party |
|---|---|---|
| Party | Democratic | Republican |
| Last election | 5 | 4 |
| Seats won | 6 | 4 |
| Seat change | ▲1 | Steady |
| Popular vote | 1,636,726 | 1,369,540 |
| Percentage | 54.44% | 45.56% |
| Swing | ▲2.15% | ▼0.22% |

Democratic hold Democratic gain
Republican hold
Democratic
50–60%
60–70%
70–80%
Republican
50–60%
60–70%
70–80%

The 2012 United States House of Representatives elections in Washington were held on Tuesday, November 6, 2012, to elect the ten U.S. representatives from the state, one from each of the state's ten congressional districts, a gain of one seat following the 2010 United States census. The elections coincided with the elections of other federal and state offices, including a federal quadrennial presidential election, concurrent statewide gubernatorial election, quadrennial statewide lieutenant gubernatorial election, and an election to the U.S. Senate. The state certified the returns on December 6, 2012. Primary elections were held August 7, 2012.

== Overview ==
=== District ===
| District | Democratic | | Republican | | Total | | Result |
| District | Votes | % | Votes | % | Votes | Votes | % |
|---|---|---|---|---|---|---|---|
| District 1 | 177,025 | 53.94% | 151,187 | 46.06% | 328,212 | 100.00% | Democratic hold |
| District 2 | 184,826 | 61.14% | 117,465 | 38.86% | 302,291 | 100.00% | Democratic hold |
| District 3 | 116,438 | 39.62% | 177,446 | 60.38% | 293,884 | 100.00% | Republican hold |
| District 4 | 78,940 | 33.78% | 154,749 | 66.22% | 233,689 | 100.00% | Republican hold |
| District 5 | 117,512 | 38.08% | 191,066 | 61.92% | 308,578 | 100.00% | Republican hold |
| District 6 | 186,661 | 59.00% | 129,725 | 41.00% | 316,386 | 100.00% | Democratic hold |
| District 7 | 298,368 | 79.65% | 76,212 | 20.35% | 374,580 | 100.00% | Democratic hold |
| District 8 | 121,886 | 40.35% | 180,204 | 59.65% | 302,090 | 100.00% | Republican hold |
| District 9 | 192,034 | 71.62% | 76,105 | 28.38% | 268,139 | 100.00% | Democratic hold |
| District 10 | 163,036 | 58.56% | 115,381 | 41.44% | 278,417 | 100.00% | Democratic gain |
| Total | 1,636,726 | 54.44% | 1,369,540 | 45.56% | 3,006,266 | 100.00% | |

Popular vote
| Democratic | 54.44% |
| Republican | 45.56% |

House seats
| Democratic | 60.00% |
| Republican | 40.00% |

== District 1 ==
2012 Washington's 1st congressional district election
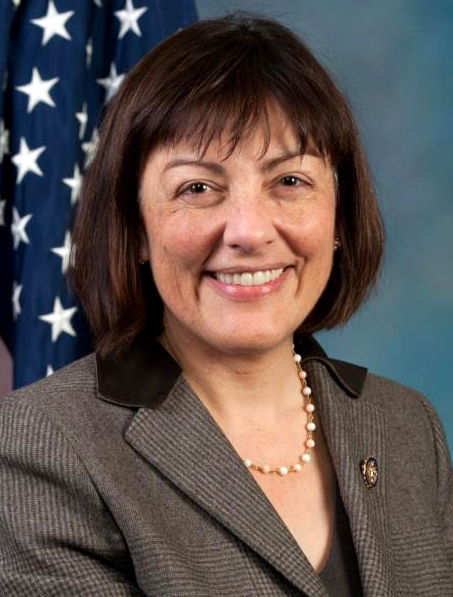

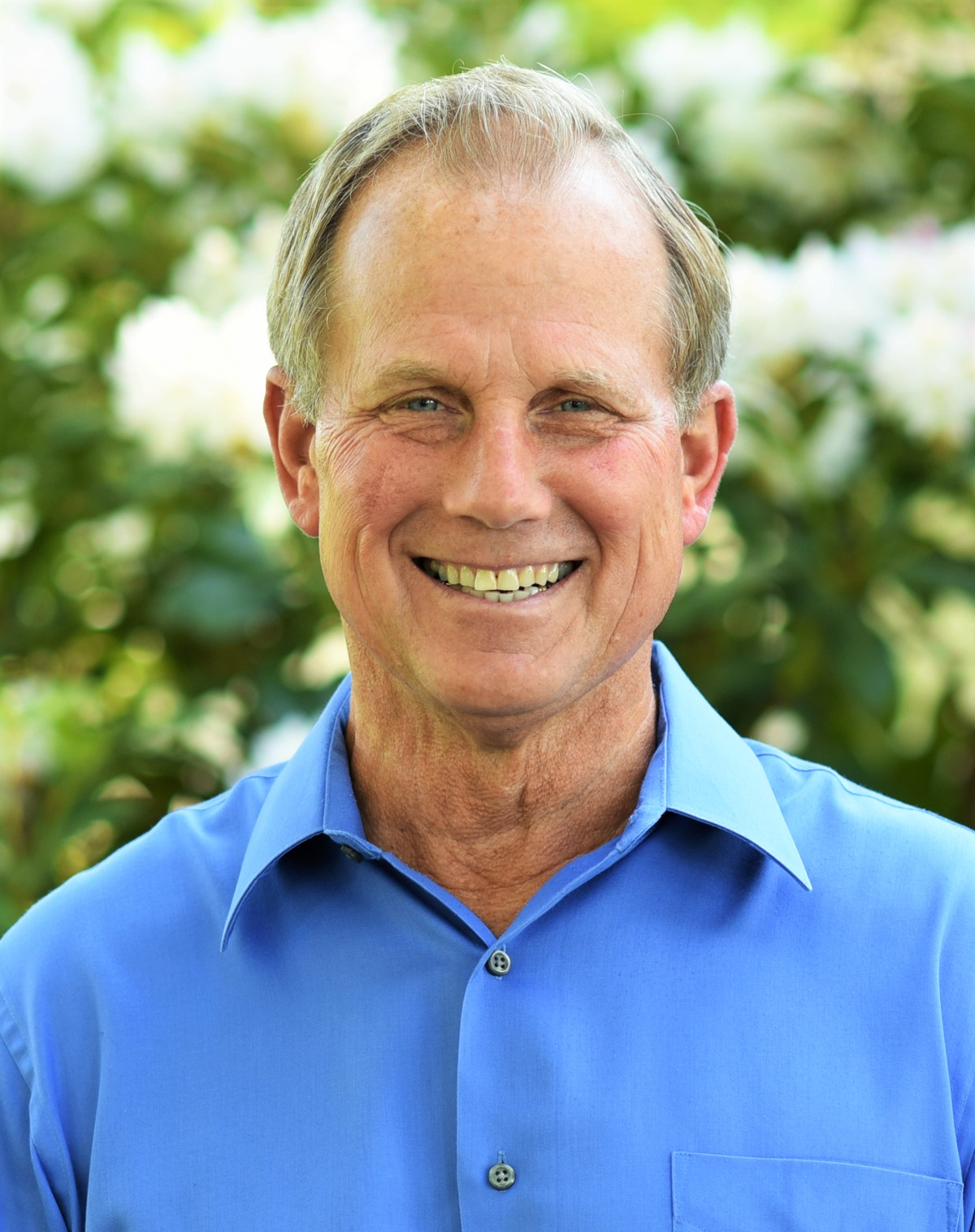
| Nominee | Suzan DelBene | John Koster |
| Party | Democratic | Republican |
| Popular vote | 177,025 | 151,187 |
| Percentage | 53.9% | 46.1% |
- DelBene: 50–60% Koster: 50–60%
U.S. Representative before election
Jay Inslee
Democratic
Elected U.S. Representative
Suzan DelBene
Democratic

Democrat Jay Inslee, who represented the 1st district starting in 1999, resigned on March 20, 2012, to focus on his run for governor of Washington.

=== Primary election ===
==== Democratic candidates ====
===== Advanced to general =====
- Suzan DelBene, former director at the Washington State Department of Revenue, general election candidate for the 8th district in 2010

===== Eliminated in primary =====
- Darcy Burner, former manager at Microsoft and general election candidate for the 8th district in 2006 & 2008
- Steve Hobbs, state senator
- Darshan Rauniyar, businessman and political activist
- Laura Ruderman, former state representative

===== Withdrawn =====
- Roger Goodman, state representative

===== Declined =====
- Brian Baird, former U.S. representative
- Andrew Hughes, tax attorney
- Dennis Kucinich, incumbent U.S. representative for Ohio's 10th congressional district
- Marko Liias, state representative

==== Republican candidates ====
===== Advanced to general =====
- John Koster, former state representative, member of the Snohomish County Council and general election candidate for the 2nd district in 2010

===== Withdrawn =====
- Greg Anders, executive director of the Bellingham Heritage Flight Museum
- James Watkins, unsuccessfully ran in the 1st district in 2010

==== Independent candidates ====
===== Eliminated in primary =====
- Larry Ishmael, former member of the Issaquah School Board and Republican general election candidate for this seat in 2006 & 2008, ran as an independent candidate

==== Results ====
Results by county Koster: 30–40% 40–50% 50–60%

Republican John Koster and Democrat Suzan DelBene received the most votes in the nonpartisan blanket primary on August 7 for both the brief period of office remaining in the old 1st district and the redistricted 1st district, and faced each other in two separate ballot positions, with different boundaries, in the special election on November 6.

Nonpartisan blanket primary results
| Party | Candidate | Votes | % |
|---|---|---|---|
| Republican | John Koster | 67,185 | 44.9 |
| Democratic | Suzan DelBene | 33,670 | 22.5 |
| Democratic | Darcy Burner | 20,844 | 13.9 |
| Democratic | Laura Ruderman | 10,582 | 7.1 |
| Democratic | Steve Hobbs | 10,279 | 6.9 |
| Democratic | Darshan Rauniyar | 4,134 | 2.8 |
| Independent | Larry Ishmael | 3,062 | 2.0 |
| Total votes | | 149,756 | 100.0 |

=== Special election ===
On March 20, 2012, then representative Jay Inslee resigned his seat in the House of Representatives to run for governor. A special election was held at the same time as the general election for a representative to serve out the remainder of Inslee's term in the 112th Congress. The winner of the special glection, Suzan DelBene, assumed the seat on November 13, 2012.

==== Results ====
2012 Washington's 1st congressional district special election
| Party | Candidate | Votes | % |
|---|---|---|---|
| Democratic | Suzan DelBene | 216,144 | 60.4 |
| Republican | John Koster | 141,591 | 39.6 |
| Total votes | | 357,735 | 100.0 |
| Democratic hold | | | |

==== By county ====
County results
| County | Suzan DelBene Democratic | | John Koster Republican | | Margin | | Total votes |
| County | # | % | # | % | # | % | Total votes |
|---|---|---|---|---|---|---|---|
| King (part) | 82,711 | 64.07% | 46,374 | 35.93% | 36,337 | 28.15% | 129,085 |
| Kitsap (part) | 35,761 | 57.61% | 26,318 | 42.39% | 9,443 | 15.21% | 62,079 |
| Snohomish (part) | 97,672 | 58.64% | 68,899 | 41.36% | 28,773 | 17.27% | 166,571 |
| Totals | 216,144 | 60.42% | 141,591 | 39.58% | 74,553 | 20.84% | 357,735 |

=== General Election ===
==== Endorsements ====
Suzan DelBene (D)

Organizations

- Democratic Congressional Campaign Committee "Red to Blue" Program
- EMILY's List

==== Polling ====
| Poll source | Date(s) administered | Sample size | Margin of error | Suzan DelBene (D) | John Koster (R) | Undecided |
|---|---|---|---|---|---|---|
| SurveyUSA | October 19–21, 2012 | 610 | ± 4% | 47% | 44% | 9% |
| SurveyUSA | September 13–15, 2012 | 592 | ± 4.1% | 42% | 46% | 12% |
| SurveyUSA | May 29–30, 2012 | 661 | ± 3.9% | 32% | 49% | 19% |

==== Predictions ====
| Source | Ranking | As of |
|---|---|---|
| The Cook Political Report | Lean D | November 5, 2012 |
| Rothenberg | Lean D | November 2, 2012 |
| Roll Call | Likely D | November 4, 2012 |
| Sabato's Crystal Ball | Likely D | November 5, 2012 |
| NY Times | Lean D | November 4, 2012 |
| RCP | Lean D | November 4, 2012 |
| The Hill | Lean D | November 4, 2012 |

==== Results ====
DelBene won and was sworn in to serve the remainder of Inslee's term on November 13, 2012.

2012 Washington's 1st congressional district election
| Party | Candidate | Votes | % |
|---|---|---|---|
| Democratic | Suzan DelBene | 177,025 | 53.9 |
| Republican | John Koster | 151,187 | 46.1 |
| Total votes | | 328,212 | 100.0 |
| Democratic hold | | | |

==== By county ====
County results
| County | Suzan DelBene Democratic | | John Koster Republican | | Margin | | Total votes |
| County | # | % | # | % | # | % | Total votes |
|---|---|---|---|---|---|---|---|
| King (part) | 80,054 | 59.73% | 53,969 | 40.27% | 26,085 | 19.46% | 134,023 |
| Skagit (part) | 10,873 | 54.17% | 9,199 | 45.83% | 1,674 | 8.34% | 20,072 |
| Snohomish (part) | 63,418 | 51.72% | 59,201 | 48.28% | 4,217 | 3.44% | 122,619 |
| Whatcom (part) | 22,680 | 44.04% | 28,818 | 55.96% | -6,138 | -11.92% | 51,498 |
| Totals | 177,025 | 53.94% | 151,187 | 46.06% | 25,838 | 7.87% | 328,212 |

== District 2 ==
2012 Washington's 2nd congressional district election
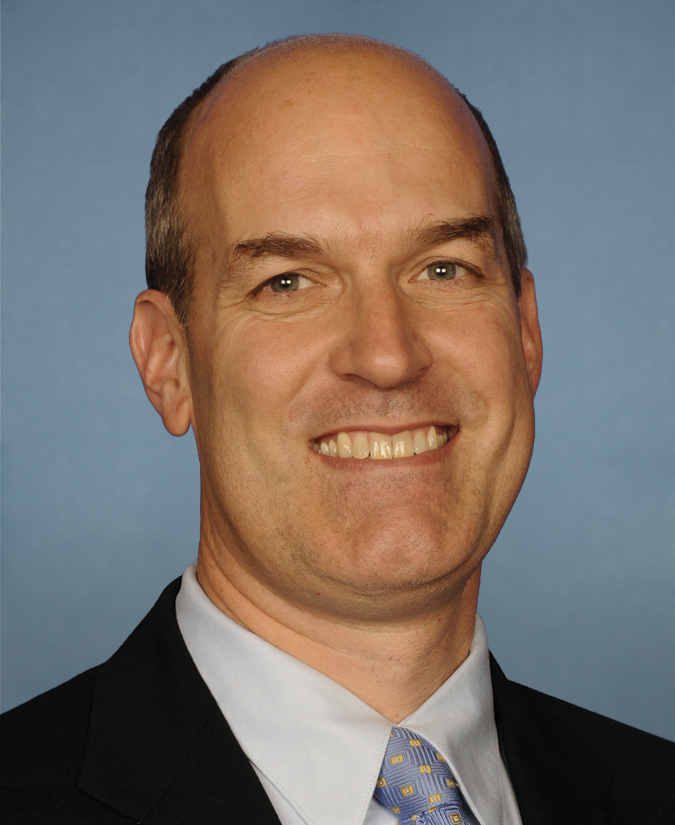

| Nominee | Rick Larsen | Dan Matthews |
| Party | Democratic | Republican |
| Popular vote | 184,826 | 117,465 |
| Percentage | 61.1% | 38.9% |
- Larsen: 50–60% 60–70% 70–80%
U.S. Representative before election
Rick Larsen
Democratic
Elected U.S. Representative
Rick Larsen
Democratic

Democrat Rick Larsen, who represented the 2nd district since 2001, ran for re-election.

In the December 2011 redistricting proposal, the 2nd district was made more favorable to Democrats.

=== Primary election ===
==== Democratic candidates ====
===== Advanced to general =====
- Rick Larsen, incumbent U.S. representative

==== Republican candidates ====
===== Advanced to general =====
- Dan Matthews, Air Force veteran and pilot

===== Eliminated in primary =====
- Eli Olson, electrical distribution company manager and political director for the Snohomish County Young Republicans
- John C. W. Shoop, United States Marine, combat veteran and survival instructor

===== Declined =====
- Greg Anders, director of the Bellingham Heritage Flight Museum
- John Koster, former state representative, member of the Snohomish County Council and general election candidate for this seat in 2010

==== Other parties' candidates ====
===== Eliminated in primary =====
- Mike Lapointe (99% Party)

==== Independent candidates ====
===== Eliminated in primary =====
- Glen S. Johnson

==== Results ====
Results by county Larsen: 50–60% 60–70%

Nonpartisan blanket primary results
| Party | Candidate | Votes | % |
|---|---|---|---|
| Democratic | Rick Larsen (incumbent) | 79,632 | 57.2 |
| Republican | Dan Matthews | 39,956 | 28.7 |
| Republican | John C. W. Shoop | 8,130 | 5.8 |
| 99% Party | Mike Lapointe | 5,806 | 4.2 |
| Republican | Eli Olson | 3,373 | 2.4 |
| No party preference | Glen S. Johnson | 2,289 | 1.6 |
| Total votes | | 139,186 | 100.0 |

=== General election ===
==== Predictions ====
| Source | Ranking | As of |
|---|---|---|
| The Cook Political Report | Safe D | November 5, 2012 |
| Rothenberg | Safe D | November 2, 2012 |
| Roll Call | Safe D | November 4, 2012 |
| Sabato's Crystal Ball | Safe D | November 5, 2012 |
| NY Times | Safe D | November 4, 2012 |
| RCP | Safe D | November 4, 2012 |
| The Hill | Safe D | November 4, 2012 |

==== Results ====
2012 Washington's 2nd congressional district election
| Party | Candidate | Votes | % |
|---|---|---|---|
| Democratic | Rick Larsen (incumbent) | 184,826 | 61.1 |
| Republican | Dan Matthews | 117,465 | 38.9 |
| Total votes | | 302,291 | 100.0 |
| Democratic hold | | | |

==== By county ====
County results
| County | Rick Larsen Democratic | | Dan Matthews Republican | | Margin | | Total votes |
| County | # | % | # | % | # | % | Total votes |
|---|---|---|---|---|---|---|---|
| Island | 22,353 | 54.46% | 18,691 | 45.54% | 3,662 | 8.92% | 41,044 |
| San Juan | 7,164 | 69.30% | 3,173 | 30.70% | 3,991 | 38.61% | 10,337 |
| Skagit (part) | 18,669 | 55.13% | 15,196 | 44.87% | 3,473 | 10.26% | 33,865 |
| Snohomish (part) | 102,490 | 60.60% | 66,641 | 39.40% | 35,849 | 21.20% | 169,131 |
| Whatcom (part) | 34,150 | 71.27% | 13,764 | 28.73% | 20,386 | 42.55% | 47,914 |
| Totals | 184,826 | 61.14% | 117,465 | 38.86% | 67,361 | 22.28% | 302,291 |

== District 3 ==
2012 Washington's 3rd congressional district election
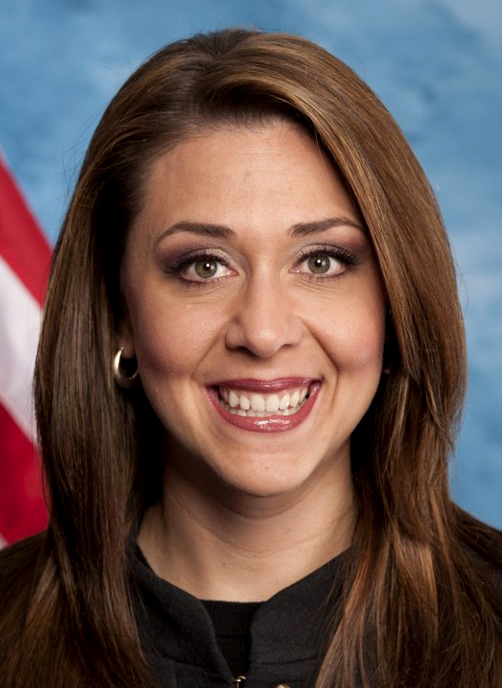

| Nominee | Jaime Herrera Beutler | Jon Haugen |
| Party | Republican | Democratic |
| Popular vote | 177,446 | 116,438 |
| Percentage | 60.4% | 39.6% |
- County results Beutler: 50–60% 60–70% 70–80%
U.S. Representative before election
Jaime Herrera Beutler
Republican
Elected U.S. Representative
Jaime Herrera Beutler
Republican

Republican Jaime Herrera Beutler, who represented the 3rd district since January 2011, ran for re-election.

=== Primary election ===
==== Republican candidates ====
===== Advanced to general =====
- Jaime Herrera Beutler, incumbent U.S. representative

==== Democratic candidates ====
===== Advanced to general =====
- Jon Haugen, commercial pilot for Delta Air Lines

===== Withdrawn =====
- Elizabeth Uelmen, middle school associate principal

===== Declined =====
- Tim Leavitt, mayor of Vancouver
- Steve Stuart, Clark County commissioner

==== Results ====
Results by county Herrera Beutler: 40–50% 50–60% 70–80%

Nonpartisan blanket primary results
| Party | Candidate | Votes | % |
|---|---|---|---|
| Republican | Jaime Herrera Beutler (incumbent) | 68,603 | 56.5 |
| Democratic | Jon Haugen | 45,693 | 37.6 |
| No party preference | Norma Jean Stevens | 7,108 | 5.9 |
| Total votes | | 121,404 | 100.0 |

=== General election ===
==== Predictions ====
| Source | Ranking | As of |
|---|---|---|
| The Cook Political Report | Safe R | November 5, 2012 |
| Rothenberg | Safe R | November 2, 2012 |
| Roll Call | Safe R | November 4, 2012 |
| Sabato's Crystal Ball | Safe R | November 5, 2012 |
| NY Times | Safe R | November 4, 2012 |
| RCP | Safe R | November 4, 2012 |
| The Hill | Likely R | November 4, 2012 |

==== Results ====
2012 Washington's 3rd congressional district election
| Party | Candidate | Votes | % |
|---|---|---|---|
| Republican | Jaime Herrera Beutler (incumbent) | 177,446 | 60.4 |
| Democratic | Jon Haugen | 116,438 | 39.6 |
| Total votes | | 293,884 | 100.0 |
| Republican hold | | | |

==== By county ====
County results
| County | Jaime Herrera Beutler Republican | | Jon Haugen Democratic | | Margin | | Total votes |
| County | # | % | # | % | # | % | Total votes |
|---|---|---|---|---|---|---|---|
| Clark | 109,652 | 59.45% | 74,799 | 40.55% | 34,853 | 18.90% | 184,451 |
| Cowlitz | 25,187 | 57.75% | 18,424 | 42.25% | 6,763 | 15.51% | 43,611 |
| Klickitat | 5,858 | 59.21% | 4,035 | 40.79% | 1,823 | 18.43% | 9,893 |
| Lewis | 23,811 | 72.12% | 9,206 | 27.88% | 14,605 | 44.23% | 33,017 |
| Pacific | 5,549 | 54.63% | 4,609 | 45.37% | 940 | 9.25% | 10,158 |
| Skamania | 3,096 | 58.76% | 2,173 | 41.24% | 923 | 17.52% | 5,269 |
| Thurston (part) | 2,914 | 55.56% | 2,331 | 44.44% | 583 | 11.12% | 5,245 |
| Wahkiakum | 1,379 | 61.56% | 861 | 38.44% | 518 | 23.13% | 2,240 |
| Totals | 177,446 | 60.38% | 116,438 | 39.62% | 61,008 | 20.76% | 293,884 |

== District 4 ==
2012 Washington's 4th congressional district election
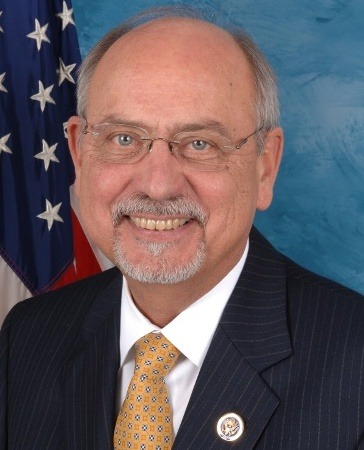

| Nominee | Doc Hastings | Mary Beachler |
| Party | Republican | Democratic |
| Popular vote | 154,749 | 78,940 |
| Percentage | 66.2% | 33.8% |
- County results Hastings: 50–60% 60–70% 70–80%
U.S. Representative before election
Doc Hastings
Republican
Elected U.S. Representative
Doc Hastings
Republican

Republican Doc Hastings, who represented the 4th district since 1995, successfully ran for re-election.

=== Primary election ===
==== Republican candidates ====
===== Advanced to general =====
- Doc Hastings, incumbent U.S. representative

===== Eliminated in primary =====
- Jamie Wheeler, state director for FairTax.org and member of the Tri-Cities Tea Party

==== Democratic candidates ====
===== Advanced to general =====
- Mary Baechler, businesswoman

===== Eliminated in primary =====
- Mohammad H. Said, doctor

===== Withdrawn =====
- Jay Clough, radiological control technician and nominee for this seat in 2010

==== Results ====
Results by county Hastings: 50–60% 60–70% 70–80%

Nonpartisan blanket primary results
| Party | Candidate | Votes | % |
|---|---|---|---|
| Republican | Doc Hastings (incumbent) | 60,774 | 59.3 |
| Democratic | Mary Baechler | 27,130 | 26.5 |
| Republican | Jamie Wheeler | 11,581 | 11.3 |
| Democratic | Mohammad H. Said | 2,958 | 2.9 |
| Total votes | | 102,443 | 100.0 |

=== General election ===
==== Predictions ====
| Source | Ranking | As of |
|---|---|---|
| The Cook Political Report | Safe R | November 5, 2012 |
| Rothenberg | Safe R | November 2, 2012 |
| Roll Call | Safe R | November 4, 2012 |
| Sabato's Crystal Ball | Safe R | November 5, 2012 |
| NY Times | Safe R | November 4, 2012 |
| RCP | Safe R | November 4, 2012 |
| The Hill | Safe R | November 4, 2012 |

==== Results ====
2012 Washington's 4th congressional district election
| Party | Candidate | Votes | % |
|---|---|---|---|
| Republican | Doc Hastings (incumbent) | 154,749 | 66.2 |
| Democratic | Mary Baechler | 78,940 | 33.8 |
| Total votes | | 233,689 | 100.0 |
| Republican hold | | | |

==== By county ====
County results
| County | Doc Hastings Republican | | Mary Baechler Democratic | | Margin | | Total votes |
| County | # | % | # | % | # | % | Total votes |
|---|---|---|---|---|---|---|---|
| Adams | 3,473 | 75.70% | 1,115 | 24.30% | 2,358 | 51.39% | 4,588 |
| Benton | 54,409 | 70.19% | 23,105 | 29.81% | 31,304 | 40.38% | 77,514 |
| Douglas (part) | 5,846 | 71.43% | 2,338 | 28.57% | 3,508 | 42.86% | 8,184 |
| Franklin | 15,197 | 68.21% | 7,082 | 31.79% | 8,115 | 36.42% | 22,279 |
| Grant | 19,622 | 72.40% | 7,481 | 27.60% | 12,141 | 44.80% | 27,103 |
| Okanogan | 10,335 | 63.04% | 6,060 | 36.96% | 4,275 | 26.08% | 16,395 |
| Walla Walla (part) | 1,697 | 77.42% | 495 | 22.58% | 1,202 | 54.84% | 2,192 |
| Yakima | 44,170 | 58.55% | 31,264 | 41.45% | 12,906 | 17.11% | 75,434 |
| Totals | 154,749 | 66.22% | 78,940 | 33.78% | 75,809 | 32.44% | 233,689 |

== District 5 ==
2012 Washington's 5th congressional district election
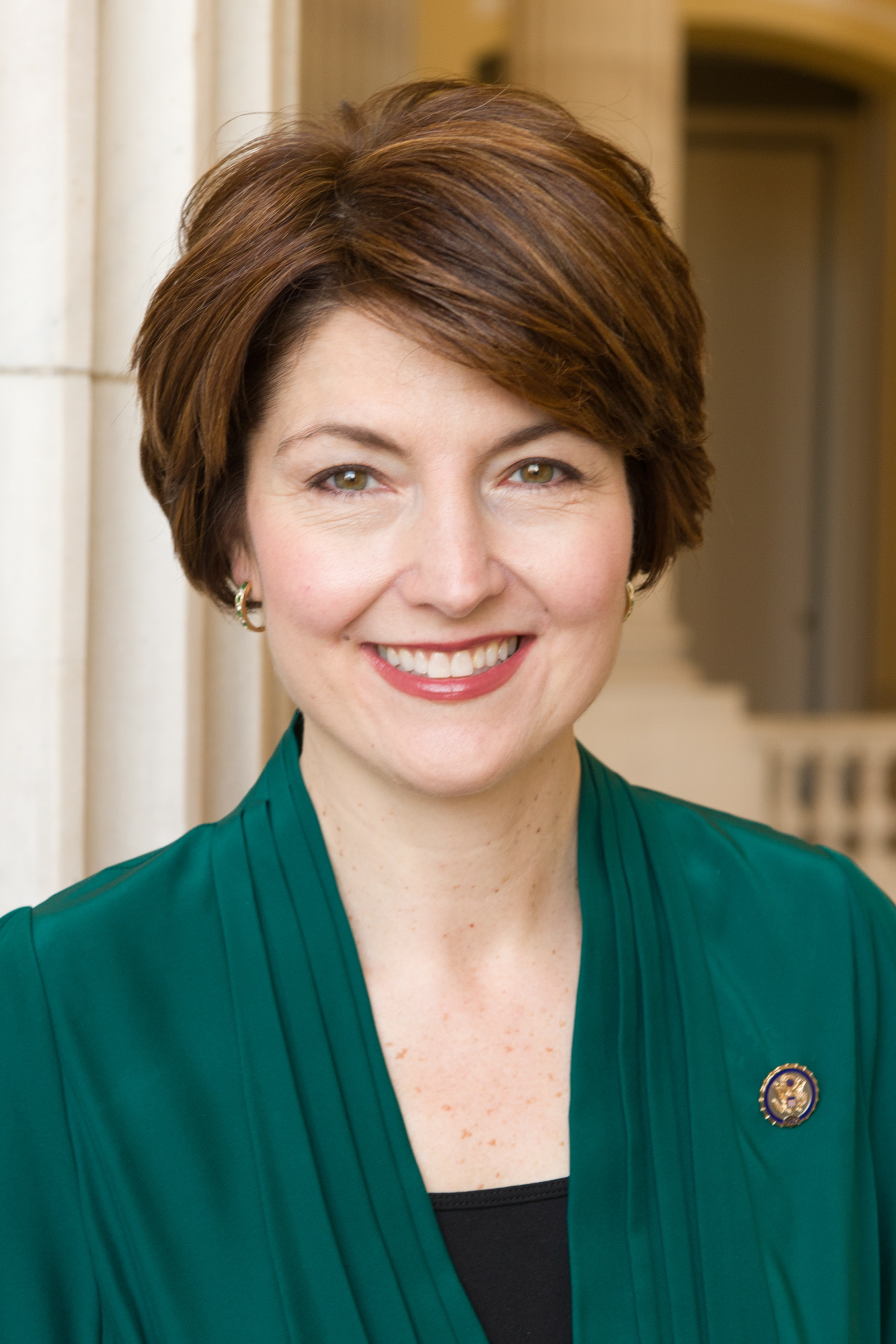

| Nominee | Cathy McMorris Rodgers | Rich Cowan |
| Party | Republican | Democratic |
| Popular vote | 191,066 | 117,512 |
| Percentage | 61.9% | 38.1% |
- Rodgers: 50–60% 60–70% 70–80%
U.S. Representative before election
Cathy McMorris Rodgers
Republican
Elected U.S. Representative
Cathy McMorris Rodgers
Republican

Republican Cathy McMorris Rodgers, who represented the 5th district since 2005, ran successfully for re-election in 2012.

=== Primary election ===
==== Republican candidates ====
===== Advanced to general =====
- Cathy McMorris Rodgers, incumbent U.S. representative

===== Eliminated in primary =====
- Randall Yearout, crane operator

==== Democratic candidates ====
===== Advanced to general =====
- Rich Cowan, president and CEO of a film production company

===== Declined =====
- Dan Morrissey, professor at Gonzaga University School of Law
- Mary Verner, former mayor of Spokane

==== Results ====
Results by county McMorris Rodgers: 50–60% 60–70% 70–80%

Nonpartisan blanket primary results
| Party | Candidate | Votes | % |
|---|---|---|---|
| Republican | Cathy McMorris Rodgers (incumbent) | 83,186 | 55.8 |
| Democratic | Rich Cowan | 49,406 | 33.1 |
| Republican | Randall Yearout | 11,894 | 8.0 |
| No party preference | Ian Moody | 4,693 | 3.1 |
| Total votes | | 149,179 | 100.0 |

=== General election ===
==== Predictions ====
| Source | Ranking | As of |
|---|---|---|
| The Cook Political Report | Safe R | November 5, 2012 |
| Rothenberg | Safe R | November 2, 2012 |
| Roll Call | Safe R | November 4, 2012 |
| Sabato's Crystal Ball | Safe R | November 5, 2012 |
| NY Times | Safe R | November 4, 2012 |
| RCP | Safe R | November 4, 2012 |
| The Hill | Safe R | November 4, 2012 |

==== Results ====
2012 Washington's 5th congressional district election
| Party | Candidate | Votes | % |
|---|---|---|---|
| Republican | Cathy McMorris Rodgers (incumbent) | 191,066 | 61.9 |
| Democratic | Rich Cowan | 117,512 | 38.1 |
| Total votes | | 308,578 | 100.0 |
| Republican hold | | | |

==== By county ====
County results
| County | Cathy McMorris Rodgers Republican | | Rich Cowan Democratic | | Margin | | Total votes |
| County | # | % | # | % | # | % | Total votes |
|---|---|---|---|---|---|---|---|
| Asotin | 6,091 | 62.96% | 3,583 | 37.04% | 2,508 | 25.93% | 9,674 |
| Columbia | 1,627 | 72.70% | 611 | 27.30% | 1,016 | 45.40% | 2,238 |
| Ferry | 2,256 | 66.08% | 1,158 | 33.92% | 1,098 | 32.16% | 3,414 |
| Garfield | 947 | 75.82% | 302 | 24.18% | 645 | 51.64% | 1,249 |
| Lincoln | 4,452 | 76.48% | 1,369 | 23.52% | 3,083 | 52.96% | 5,821 |
| Pend Oreille | 4,255 | 64.42% | 2,350 | 35.58% | 1,905 | 28.84% | 6,605 |
| Spokane | 132,859 | 60.67% | 86,120 | 39.33% | 46,739 | 21.34% | 218,979 |
| Stevens | 15,388 | 69.90% | 6,625 | 30.10% | 8,763 | 39.81% | 22,013 |
| Walla Walla (part) | 13,660 | 61.53% | 8,542 | 38.47% | 5,118 | 23.05% | 22,202 |
| Whitman | 9,531 | 58.18% | 6,852 | 41.82% | 2,679 | 16.35% | 16,383 |
| Totals | 191,066 | 61.92% | 117,512 | 38.08% | 73,554 | 23.84% | 308,578 |

== District 6 ==
2012 Washington's 6th congressional district election
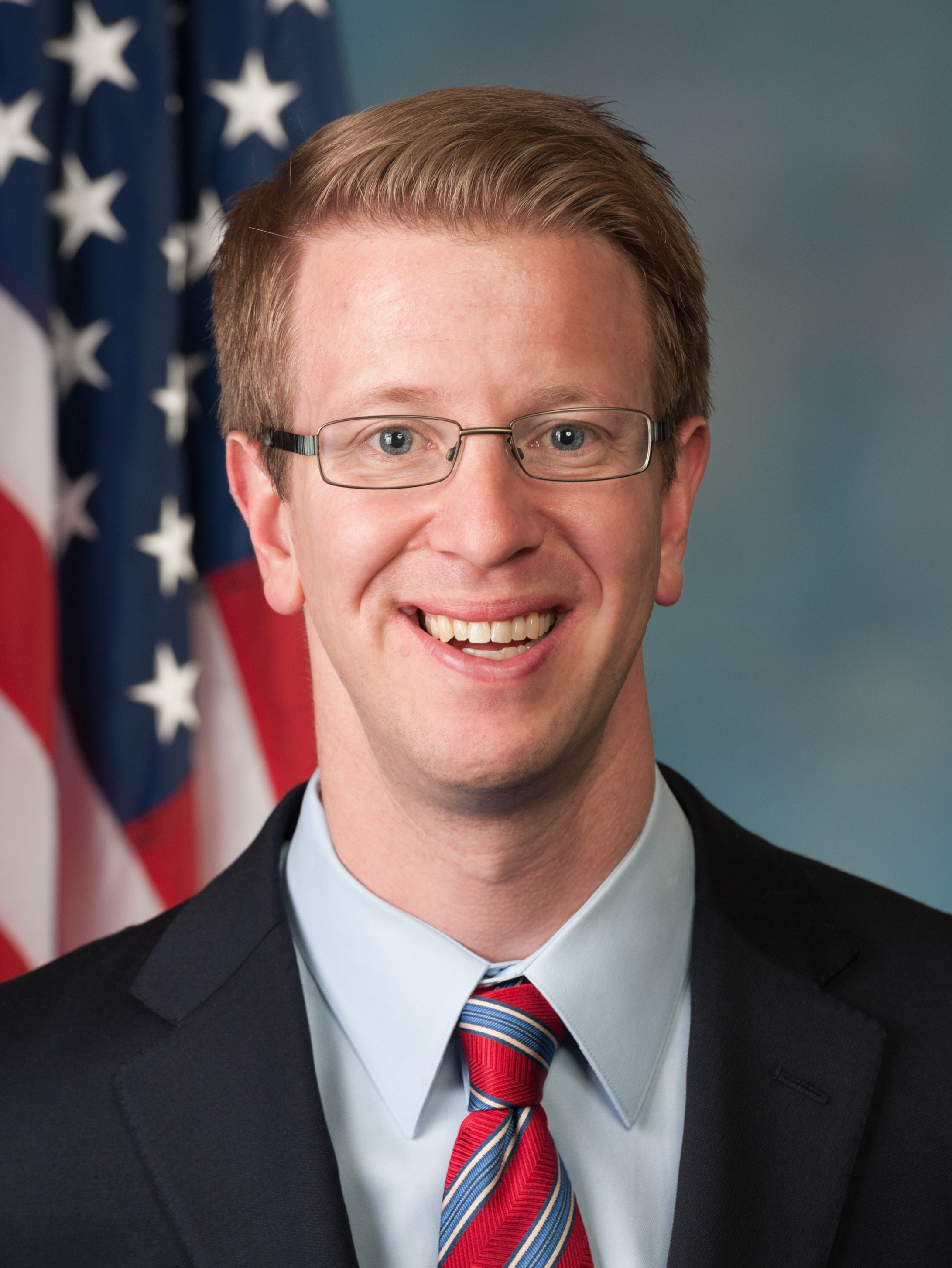

| Nominee | Derek Kilmer | Bill Driscoll |
| Party | Democratic | Republican |
| Popular vote | 186,661 | 129,725 |
| Percentage | 59.0% | 41.0% |
- County results Kilmer: 50–60% 60–70%
U.S. Representative before election
Norm Dicks
Democratic
Elected U.S. Representative
Derek Kilmer
Democratic

Democrat Norm Dicks, who represented the 6th district since 1977, decided to retire rather than seeking re-election.

=== Primary election ===
==== Democratic candidates ====
===== Advanced to general =====
- Derek Kilmer, state senator

===== Declined =====
- Steve Boyer, Kitsap County sheriff
- Josh Brown, Kitsap County commissioner
- Norman D. Dicks, incumbent U.S. representative
- James Hargrove, state senator
- Mark Lindquist, Pierce County prosecutor
- Pat McCarthy, Pierce County executive
- Christine Rolfes, state senator
- Tim Sheldon, state senator and Mason County commissioner
- Brian Sonntag, state auditor
- Marilyn Strickland, mayor of Tacoma
- Kevin Van De Wege, state representative

==== Republican candidates ====
===== Advanced to general =====
- Bill Driscoll, businessman

===== Eliminated in primary =====
- Stephan Brodhead, small business owner
- Doug Cloud, attorney and general election candidate for this seat in 2004 and 2006, 2008 & 2010
- David "Ike" Eichner, accountant
- Jesse Young, technology consultant and candidate for this seat in 2010

===== Withdrawn =====
- Bob Sauerwein, insurance agent

===== Declined =====
- Jan Angel, state representative

==== Results ====
Results by county Kilmer: 40–50% 50–60% 60–70%

Nonpartisan blanket primary results
| Party | Candidate | Votes | % |
|---|---|---|---|
| Democratic | Derek Kilmer | 86,436 | 53.4 |
| Republican | Bill Driscoll | 29,602 | 18.3 |
| Republican | Jesse Young | 18,075 | 11.2 |
| Republican | Doug Cloud | 14,267 | 8.8 |
| Republican | David Eichner | 7,966 | 4.9 |
| Independent | Eric G. Arentz Jr. | 4,101 | 2.5 |
| Republican | Stephan Brodhead | 1,387 | 0.9 |
| Total votes | | 161,834 | 100.0 |

=== General election ===
==== Polling ====
| Poll source | Date(s) administered | Sample size | Margin of error | Derek Kilmer (D) | Bill Driscoll (R) | Undecided |
|---|---|---|---|---|---|---|
| SurveyUSA | September 21–23, 2012 | 628 | ± 4% | 52% | 37% | 11% |

==== Predictions ====
| Source | Ranking | As of |
|---|---|---|
| The Cook Political Report | Safe D | November 5, 2012 |
| Rothenberg | Safe D | November 2, 2012 |
| Roll Call | Safe D | November 4, 2012 |
| Sabato's Crystal Ball | Safe D | November 5, 2012 |
| NY Times | Safe D | November 4, 2012 |
| RCP | Safe D | November 4, 2012 |
| The Hill | Safe D | November 4, 2012 |

==== Results ====
2012 Washington's 6th congressional district election
| Party | Candidate | Votes | % |
|---|---|---|---|
| Democratic | Derek Kilmer | 186,661 | 59.0 |
| Republican | Bill Driscoll | 129,725 | 41.0 |
| Total votes | | 316,386 | 100.0 |
| Democratic hold | | | |

==== By county ====
County results
| County | Derek Kilmer Democratic | | Bill Driscoll Republican | | Margin | | Total votes |
| County | # | % | # | % | # | % | Total votes |
|---|---|---|---|---|---|---|---|
| Clallam | 19,689 | 53.21% | 17,316 | 46.79% | 2,373 | 6.41% | 37,005 |
| Grays Harbor | 15,256 | 55.13% | 12,416 | 44.87% | 2,840 | 10.26% | 27,672 |
| Jefferson | 12,608 | 66.33% | 6,399 | 33.67% | 6,209 | 32.67% | 19,007 |
| Kitsap | 69,004 | 57.80% | 50,374 | 42.20% | 18,630 | 15.61% | 119,378 |
| Mason (part) | 11,007 | 52.85% | 9,818 | 47.15% | 1,189 | 5.71% | 20,825 |
| Pierce (part) | 59,097 | 63.89% | 33,402 | 36.11% | 25,695 | 27.78% | 92,499 |
| Totals | 186,661 | 59.00% | 129,725 | 41.00% | 56,936 | 18.00% | 316,386 |

== District 7 ==
2012 Washington's 7th congressional district election
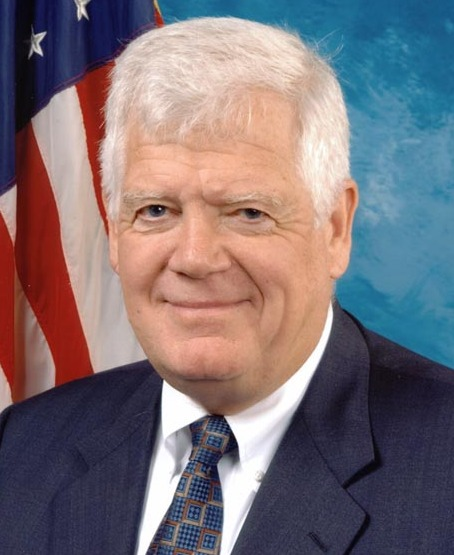

| Nominee | Jim McDermott | Ron Bemis |
| Party | Democratic | Republican |
| Popular vote | 298,368 | 76,212 |
| Percentage | 79.7% | 20.3% |
- County results McDermott: 60–70% 80–90%
U.S. Representative before election
Jim McDermott
Democratic
Elected U.S. Representative
Jim McDermott
Democratic

Democrat Jim McDermott, who represented the 7th district since 1989, ran for re-election.

=== Primary election ===
==== Democratic candidates ====
===== Advanced to general =====
- Jim McDermott, incumbent U.S. representative

===== Eliminated in primary =====
- Charles Allen, Amazon product manager
- Andrew Hughes, tax attorney
- Don Rivers, human rights activist

==== Republican candidates ====
===== Advanced to general =====
- Ron Bemis, lawyer

===== Eliminated in primary =====
- Scott Sutherland

==== Results ====
Results by county McDermott: 50–60% 70–80%

Nonpartisan blanket primary results
| Party | Candidate | Votes | % |
|---|---|---|---|
| Democratic | Jim McDermott | 124,692 | 70.9 |
| Republican | Ron Bemis | 26,791 | 15.2 |
| Democratic | Andrew Hughes | 10,340 | 5.9 |
| Republican | Scott Sutherland | 5,573 | 3.2 |
| Democratic | Charles Allen | 4,367 | 2.5 |
| Democratic | Don Rivers | 2,688 | 1.5 |
| Employmentwealth | Goodspaceguy | 1,387 | 0.8 |
| Total votes | | 175,838 | 100.0 |

=== General election ===
==== Predictions ====
| Source | Ranking | As of |
|---|---|---|
| The Cook Political Report | Safe D | November 5, 2012 |
| Rothenberg | Safe D | November 2, 2012 |
| Roll Call | Safe D | November 4, 2012 |
| Sabato's Crystal Ball | Safe D | November 5, 2012 |
| NY Times | Safe D | November 4, 2012 |
| RCP | Safe D | November 4, 2012 |
| The Hill | Safe D | November 4, 2012 |

==== Results ====
2012 Washington's 7th congressional district election
| Party | Candidate | Votes | % |
|---|---|---|---|
| Democratic | Jim McDermott (incumbent) | 298,368 | 79.7 |
| Republican | Ron Bemis | 76,212 | 20.3 |
| Total votes | | 374,580 | 100.0 |
| Democratic hold | | | |

==== By county ====
County results
| County | Jim McDermott Democratic | | Ron Bemis Republican | | Margin | | Total votes |
| County | # | % | # | % | # | % | Total votes |
|---|---|---|---|---|---|---|---|
| King (part) | 281,770 | 80.93% | 66,398 | 19.07% | 215,372 | 61.86% | 348,168 |
| Snohomish (part) | 16,598 | 62.84% | 9,814 | 37.16% | 6,784 | 25.69% | 26,412 |
| Totals | 298,368 | 79.65% | 76,212 | 20.35% | 222,156 | 59.31% | 374,580 |

== District 8 ==
2012 Washington's 8th congressional district election
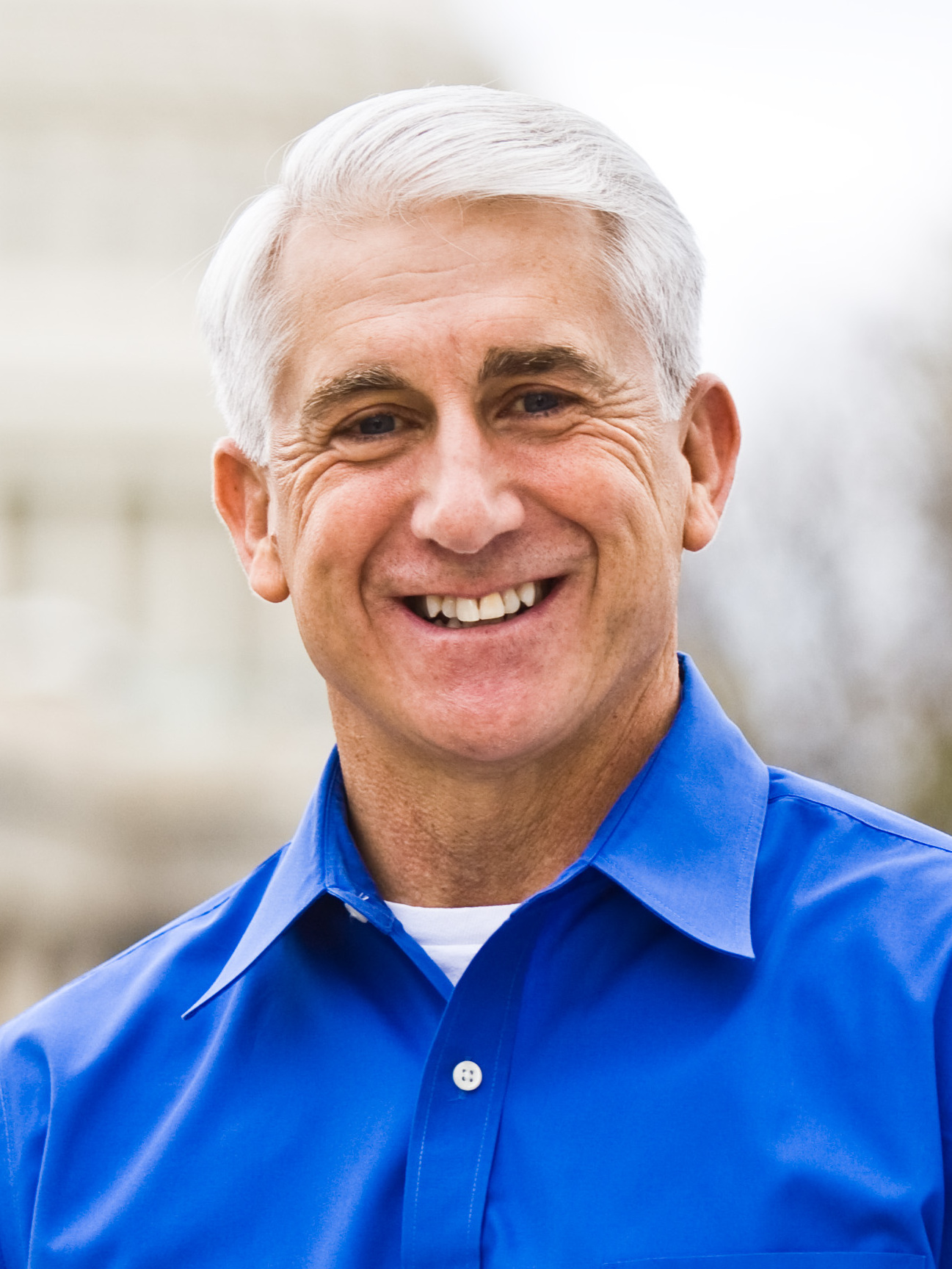

| Nominee | Dave Reichert | Karen Porterfield |
| Party | Republican | Democratic |
| Popular vote | 180,204 | 121,886 |
| Percentage | 59.7% | 40.3% |
- Reichert: 50–60% 60–70%
U.S. Representative before election
Dave Reichert
Republican
Elected U.S. Representative
Dave Reichert
Republican

Republican Dave Reichert, who represented the 8th district since 2005, ran for re-election.

=== Primary election ===
==== Republican candidates ====
===== Advanced to general =====
- Dave Reichert, incumbent U.S. representative

===== Eliminated in primary =====
- Ernest Huber, retired military commander
- Keith Swank, former police officer

==== Democratic candidates ====
===== Advanced to general =====
- Karen Porterfield, associate dean and public administration lecturer at Seattle University

===== Eliminated in primary =====
- Keith Arnold, accounting technician

==== Independent candidates ====
===== Withdrawn =====
- James Windle, associate dean and instructor at the Department of Defense's National Defense University

==== Results ====
Results by county Reichert: 40–50% 50–60% 60–70%

Nonpartisan blanket primary results
| Party | Candidate | Votes | % |
|---|---|---|---|
| Republican | Dave Reichert | 66,220 | 50.6 |
| Democratic | Karen Porterfield | 37,083 | 28.3 |
| Republican | Keith Swank | 10,942 | 8.4 |
| Democratic | Keith Arnold | 7,144 | 5.5 |
| No party preference | James Windle | 5,269 | 4.0 |
| Republican | Ernest Huber | 4,165 | 3.2 |
| Total votes | | 130,823 | 100.0 |

=== General election ===
==== Predictions ====
| Source | Ranking | As of |
|---|---|---|
| The Cook Political Report | Safe R | November 5, 2012 |
| Rothenberg | Safe R | November 2, 2012 |
| Roll Call | Safe R | November 4, 2012 |
| Sabato's Crystal Ball | Safe R | November 5, 2012 |
| NY Times | Safe R | November 4, 2012 |
| RCP | Safe R | November 4, 2012 |
| The Hill | Safe R | November 4, 2012 |

==== Results ====
2012 Washington's 8th congressional district election
| Party | Candidate | Votes | % |
|---|---|---|---|
| Republican | Dave Reichert (incumbent) | 180,204 | 59.7 |
| Democratic | Karen Porterfield | 121,886 | 40.3 |
| Total votes | | 302,090 | 100.0 |
| Republican hold | | | |

==== By county ====
County results
| County | Dave Reichert Republican | | Karen Porterfield Democratic | | Margin | | Total votes |
| County | # | % | # | % | # | % | Total votes |
|---|---|---|---|---|---|---|---|
| Chelan | 20,614 | 66.09% | 10,579 | 33.91% | 10,035 | 32.17% | 31,193 |
| Douglas (part) | 4,381 | 68.23% | 2,040 | 31.77% | 2,341 | 36.46% | 6,421 |
| King (part) | 101,354 | 56.56% | 77,854 | 43.44% | 23,500 | 13.11% | 179,208 |
| Kittitas | 10,674 | 61.89% | 6,574 | 38.11% | 4,100 | 23.77% | 17,248 |
| Pierce (part) | 43,181 | 63.48% | 24,839 | 36.52% | 18,342 | 26.97% | 68,020 |
| Totals | 180,204 | 59.65% | 121,886 | 40.35% | 58,318 | 19.30% | 302,090 |

== District 9 ==
2012 Washington's 9th congressional district election
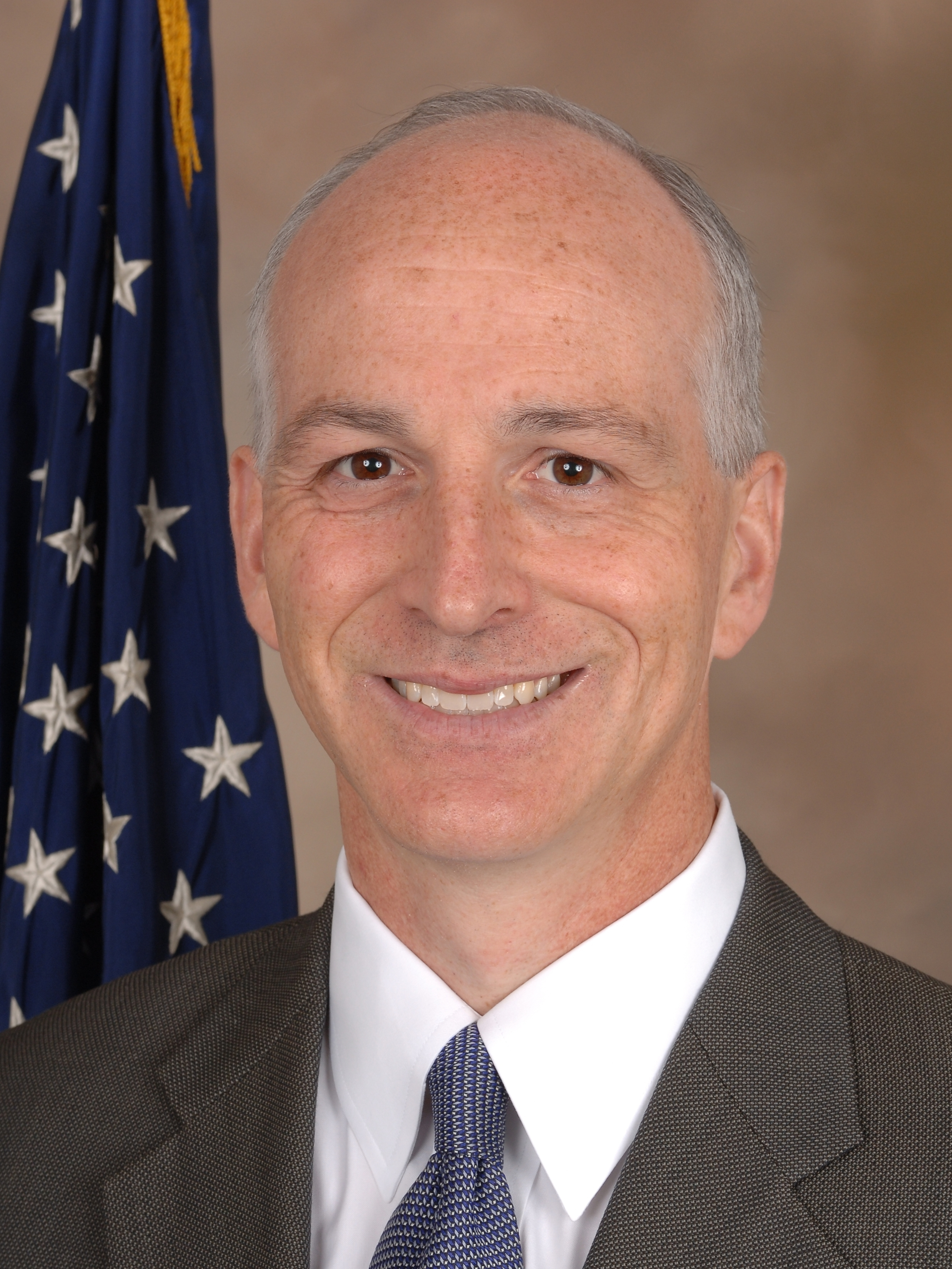

| Nominee | Adam Smith | Jim Postma |
| Party | Democratic | Republican |
| Popular vote | 192,034 | 76,105 |
| Percentage | 71.6% | 28.4% |
- County results Smith: 60–70% 70–80%
U.S. Representative before election
Adam Smith
Democratic
Elected U.S. Representative
Adam Smith
Democratic

Democrat Adam Smith, who represented the 9th district since 1997, was re-elected.

=== Primary election ===
==== Democratic candidates ====
===== Advanced to general =====
- Adam Smith, incumbent U.S. representative

===== Eliminated in primary =====
- Dave Christie
- Tom Cramer

==== Republican candidates ====
===== Advanced to general =====
- Jim Postma, businessman and candidate for this seat in 2008 and 2010

===== Eliminated in primary =====
- John Orlinski, social worker

==== Results ====
Results by county Smith: 50–60% 60–70%

Nonpartisan blanket primary results
| Party | Candidate | Votes | % |
|---|---|---|---|
| Democratic | Adam Smith | 72,868 | 61.2 |
| Republican | Jim Postma | 27,616 | 23.2 |
| Democratic | Tom Cramer | 8,376 | 7.0 |
| Republican | John Orlinski | 6,624 | 5.6 |
| Democratic | Dave Christie | 3,659 | 3.1 |
| Total votes | | 119,143 | 100.0 |

=== General election ===
==== Predictions ====
| Source | Ranking | As of |
|---|---|---|
| The Cook Political Report | Safe D | November 5, 2012 |
| Rothenberg | Safe D | November 2, 2012 |
| Roll Call | Safe D | November 4, 2012 |
| Sabato's Crystal Ball | Safe D | November 5, 2012 |
| NY Times | Safe D | November 4, 2012 |
| RCP | Safe D | November 4, 2012 |
| The Hill | Safe D | November 4, 2012 |

==== Results ====
2012 Washington's 9th congressional district election
| Party | Candidate | Votes | % |
|---|---|---|---|
| Democratic | Adam Smith (incumbent) | 192,034 | 71.6 |
| Republican | Jim Postma | 76,105 | 28.4 |
| Total votes | | 268,139 | 100.0 |
| Democratic hold | | | |

==== By county ====
County results
| County | Adam Smith Democratic | | Jim Postma Republican | | Margin | | Total votes |
| County | # | % | # | % | # | % | Total votes |
|---|---|---|---|---|---|---|---|
| King (part) | 185,846 | 72.00% | 72,282 | 28.00% | 113,564 | 44.00% | 258,128 |
| Pierce (part) | 6,188 | 61.81% | 3,823 | 38.19% | 2,365 | 23.62% | 10,011 |
| Totals | 192,034 | 71.62% | 76,105 | 28.38% | 115,929 | 43.23% | 268,139 |

== District 10 ==
2012 Washington's 10th congressional district election
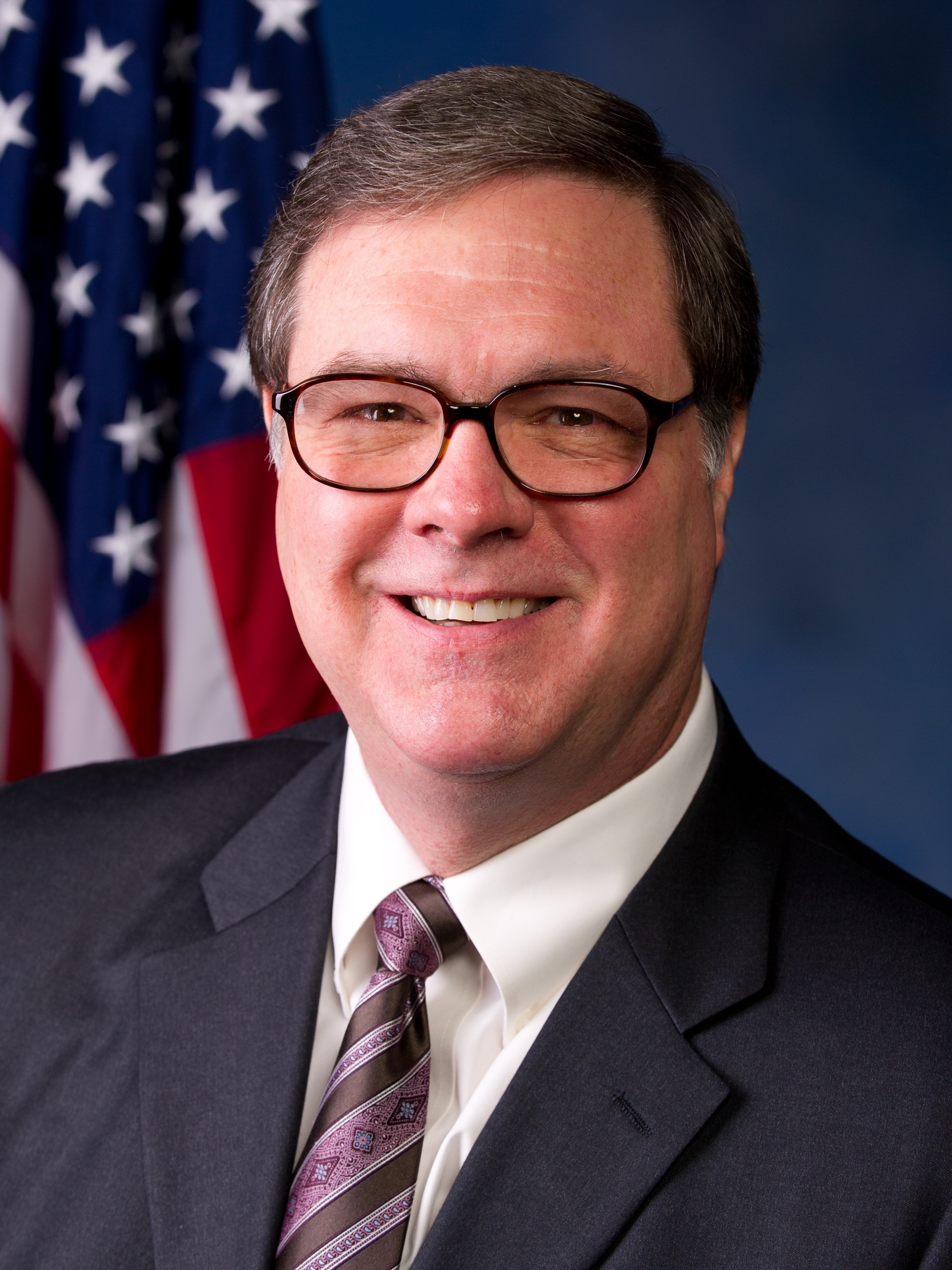

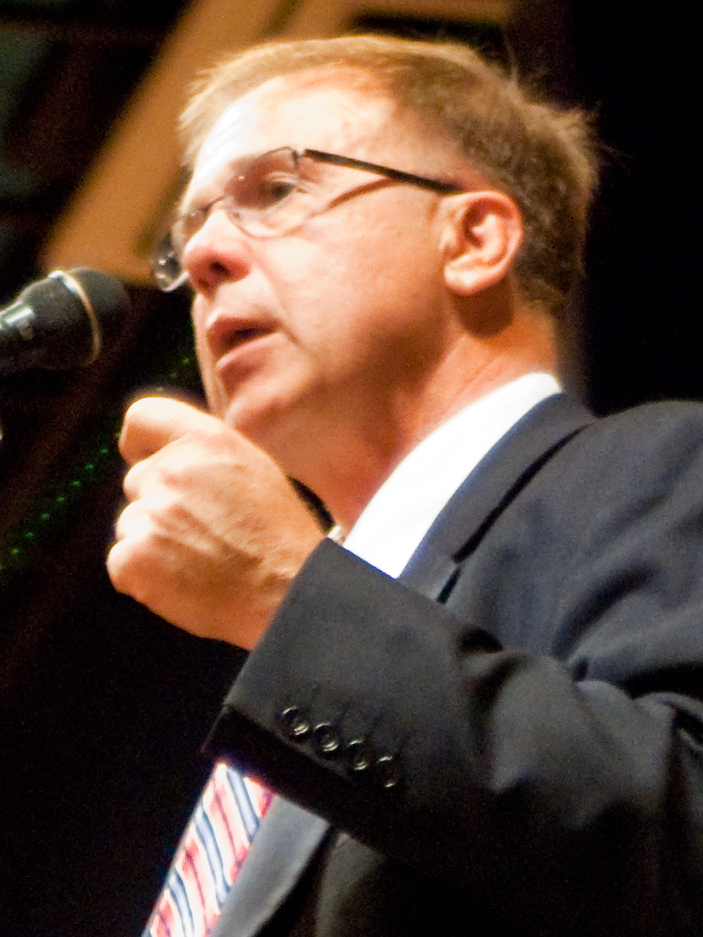
| Nominee | Denny Heck | Dick Muri |
| Party | Democratic | Republican |
| Popular vote | 163,036 | 115,381 |
| Percentage | 58.6% | 41.4% |
- Heck: 50–60% 60–70%
U.S. Representative before election
Denny Heck
Democratic
Elected U.S. Representative
Denny Heck
Democratic

The newly created 10th district is centered on the state capital, Olympia, and includes portions of Thurston, Pierce, and Mason counties.

=== Primary election ===
==== Democratic candidates ====
===== Advanced to general =====
- Denny Heck, former majority leader of the Washington House of Representatives and general election candidate for the 3rd district in 2010

===== Eliminated in primary =====
- Jennifer Ferguson, nonprofit founder and small business owner

==== Republican candidates ====
===== Advanced to general =====
- Dick Muri, Pierce County councilmember and general election candidate for the 9th district in 2010

===== Eliminated in primary =====
- Stan Flemming, Pierce County councilmember

===== Declined =====
- Dennis Kucinich, incumbent U.S. representative from Ohio's 10th congressional district

==== Results ====
Results by county Heck: 30–40% 40–50%

Nonpartisan blanket primary results
| Party | Candidate | Votes | % |
|---|---|---|---|
| Democratic | Denny Heck | 51,047 | 39.7 |
| Republican | Richard Muri | 36,173 | 28.2 |
| Republican | Stan Flemming | 19,934 | 15.5 |
| Democratic | Jennifer Ferguson | 14,026 | 10.9 |
| Progressive Independent | Sue Gunn | 4,292 | 3.3 |
| No party preference | Steve Hannon | 3,025 | 2.4 |
| Total votes | | 128,497 | 100.0 |

=== General election ===
==== Endorsements ====
Denny Heck (D)

Organizations

- Democratic Congressional Campaign Committee "Red to Blue" Program
Dick Muri (R)

Organizations

- National Republican Congressional Committee "On the Radar" Program

==== Predictions ====
| Source | Ranking | As of |
|---|---|---|
| The Cook Political Report | Safe D (flip) | November 5, 2012 |
| Rothenberg | Safe D (flip) | November 2, 2012 |
| Roll Call | Safe D (flip) | November 4, 2012 |
| Sabato's Crystal Ball | Safe D (flip) | November 5, 2012 |
| NY Times | Lean D (flip) | November 4, 2012 |
| RCP | Safe D (flip) | November 4, 2012 |
| The Hill | Likely D (flip) | November 4, 2012 |

==== Results ====
Heck defeated Muri 58.6% to 41.4%.

2012 Washington's 10th congressional district election
| Party | Candidate | Votes | % |
|---|---|---|---|
| Democratic | Denny Heck | 163,036 | 58.6 |
| Republican | Dick Muri | 115,381 | 41.4 |
| Total votes | | 278,417 | 100.0 |
| Democratic win (new seat) | | | |

==== By county ====
County results
| County | Denny Heck Democratic | | Dick Muri Republican | | Margin | | Total votes |
| County | # | % | # | % | # | % | Total votes |
|---|---|---|---|---|---|---|---|
| Mason (part) | 3,899 | 61.70% | 2,420 | 38.30% | 1,479 | 23.41% | 6,319 |
| Pierce (part) | 85,345 | 55.29% | 69,009 | 44.71% | 16,336 | 10.58% | 154,354 |
| Thurston (part) | 73,792 | 62.67% | 43,952 | 37.33% | 29,840 | 25.34% | 117,744 |
| Totals | 163,036 | 58.56% | 115,381 | 41.44% | 47,655 | 17.12% | 278,417 |

Official campaign websites
- District 1
  - Darcy Burner campaign website
  - Suzan DelBene campaign website
  - Steve Hobbs campaign website
  - Larry Ishmael campaign website
  - John Koster campaign website
  - Darshan Rauniyar campaign website
  - Laura Ruderman campaign website
- District 2
  - Mike LaPointe campaign website
  - Rick Larsen campaign website
  - Dan Matthews campaign website
  - John C.W. Shoop campaign website
  - Eli Olson campaign website
- District 3
  - Jaime Herrera Beutler campaign website
  - Jon Haugen campaign website
- District 4
  - Mary Baechler campaign website
  - Doc Hastings campaign website
  - Jamie Wheeler campaign website
- District 5
  - Rich Cowan campaign website
  - Cathy McMorris Rodgers campaign website
- District 6
  - Stephan Brodhead campaign website
  - Doug Cloud campaign website
  - Bill Driscoll campaign website
  - David Eichner campaign website
  - Derek Kilmer campaign website
  - Jesse Young campaign website
- District 7
  - Jim McDermott campaign website
- District 8
  - Dave Reichert campaign website
  - Karen Porterfield campaign website
  - James Windle campaign website
- District 9
  - Jim Postma campaign website
  - Adam Smith campaign website
- District 10
  - Stan Flemming campaign website
  - Denny Heck campaign website
  - Dick Muri campaign website
