= Mark Harmsworth =

American politician from Washington

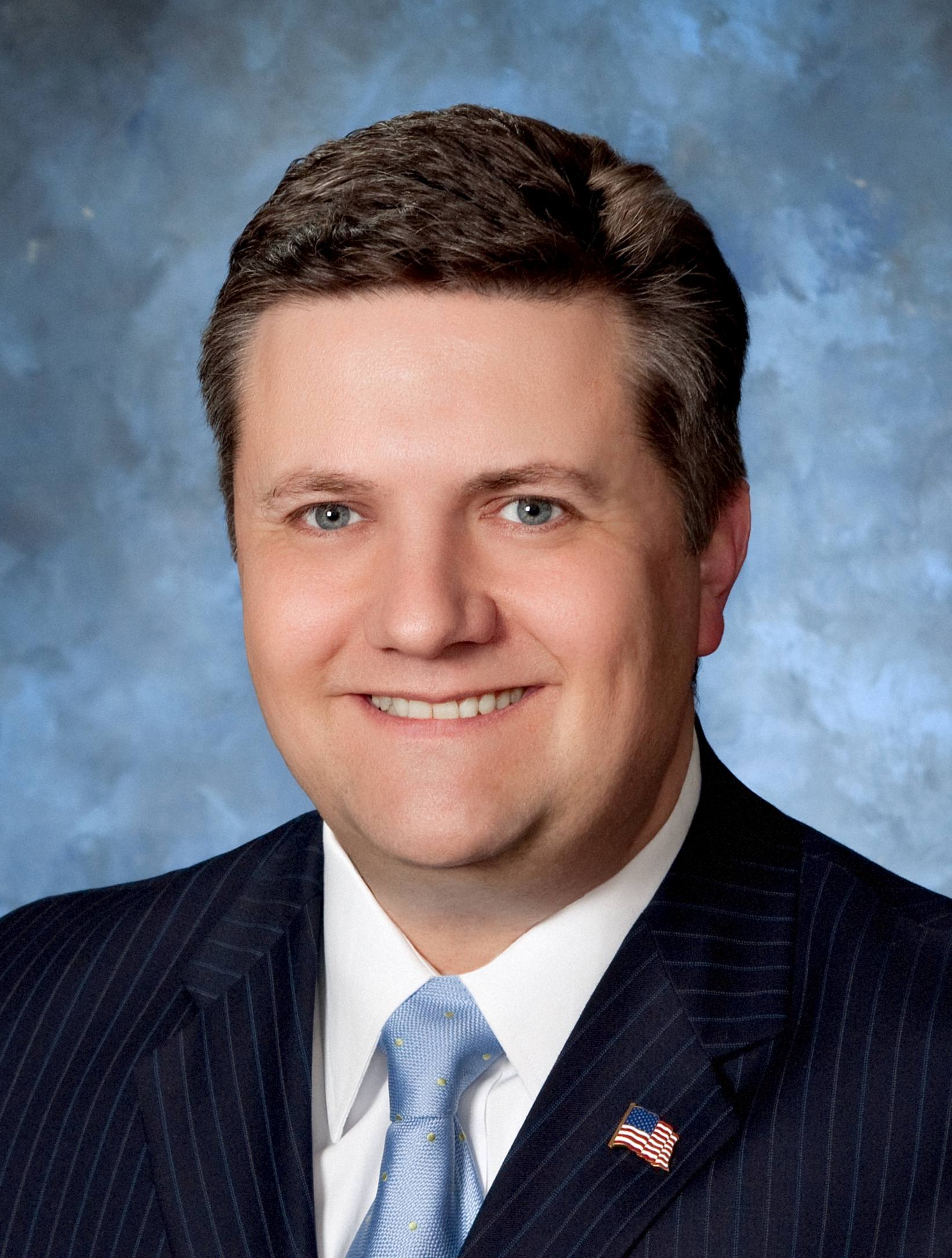

Member of the Washington House of Representatives from the 44th district
- In office November 25, 2014 – January 14, 2019
- Preceded by: Doug Roulstone
- Succeeded by: Jared Mead

Personal details
- Born: 1968 or 1969 (age 56–57) England
- Party: Republican
- Spouse: Sarah
- Children: 3
- Education: City College Plymouth (attended); Hele's School (attended)

Mark J. Harmsworth (born 1968 or 1969) is an American politician. A Republican, he served in the Washington House of Representatives from 2014 to 2019.

== Early life and education ==
Harmsworth is from England. He studied mathematics and computer science at City College Plymouth before relocating to the Seattle metropolitan area.

== Career ==
Harmsworth is a consultant with a background in the high-tech sector. He has worked for Amazon, Microsoft, Blueprint Technologies, LLC, Methodworks Consulting Inc., and others.

Harmsworth was elected to the Washington House of Representatives, succeeding Mike Hope, who resigned in summer 2014. He was local Republican leaders' first choice for appointment to Hope's seat in 2014, but Governor Jay Inslee appointed Doug Roulstone.

He has been a staunch opponent of tolling in Washington State opposing the I-405 tolls and proposed US2 trestle tolls.

Harmsworth has proposed car tab reductions and accountability to Sound Transit by directly electing the board members.

Harmsworth previously served as a city councilor in Mill Creek, Washington. He was first elected in 2007 and resigned effective December 31, 2014, after being sworn in as a state legislator. Harmsworth served as mayor pro-tem from January 2014 until he resigned from the Mill Creek City Council.

== Personal life ==
Harmsworth resides in Mill Creek, Washington.
