= Jared Mead =

American politician from Washington state

Member of the Snohomish County Council from the 4th district
- Incumbent
- Assumed office April 8, 2020
- Preceded by: Terry Ryan

Member of the Washington House of Representatives from the 44th district
- In office January 14, 2019 – January 11, 2021
- Preceded by: Mark Harmsworth
- Succeeded by: April Berg

Personal details
- Born: Jared Michel Mead; June 23, 1991 (age 35) Kirkland, Washington, U.S.
- Party: Democratic
- Spouse: Krystal Mead
- Children: 4
- Education: University of Washington Bothell (BA)

Jared Michel Mead (born June 23, 1991) is an American politician serving as a member of the Snohomish County Council, representing the 4th district since 2020. A member of the Democratic Party, he previously served as a member of the Washington House of Representatives from 2019 to 2021. He was also a member of the Mill Creek City Council.

== Career ==
Mead won the election on November 6, 2018 as a Democrat with fifty-two percent of the vote over Republican Mark Harmsworth with forty-eight percent.

He was appointed to the District 4 seat on the Snohomish County Council on April 8, 2020, filling a vacancy left by Terry Ryan, who resigned to become director of Aerospace Economic Development. Mead did not run for re-election and instead ran for election in the county council in 2020.
