= Liz Loomis =

Washington State politician

Member of the Washington House of Representatives from the 44th district
- In office January 7, 2008 – January 9, 2009 Serving with Hans Dunshee
- Preceded by: John Lovick
- Succeeded by: Mike Hope

Personal details
- Party: Democratic

Liz Loomis is an American politician who served in the Washington House of Representatives for the 44th district from January 7, 2008, to January 9, 2009. She was appointed to the seat after John Lovick vacated the seat to become Snohomish County sheriff. Loomis narrowly lost the seat to Seattle police officer Mike Hope by 118 votes in the November 2008 general election.

Prior to serving in the House, Loomis served eight years on the Snohomish City Council and two years as mayor.
