= Rick Larsen =

American politician (born 1965)

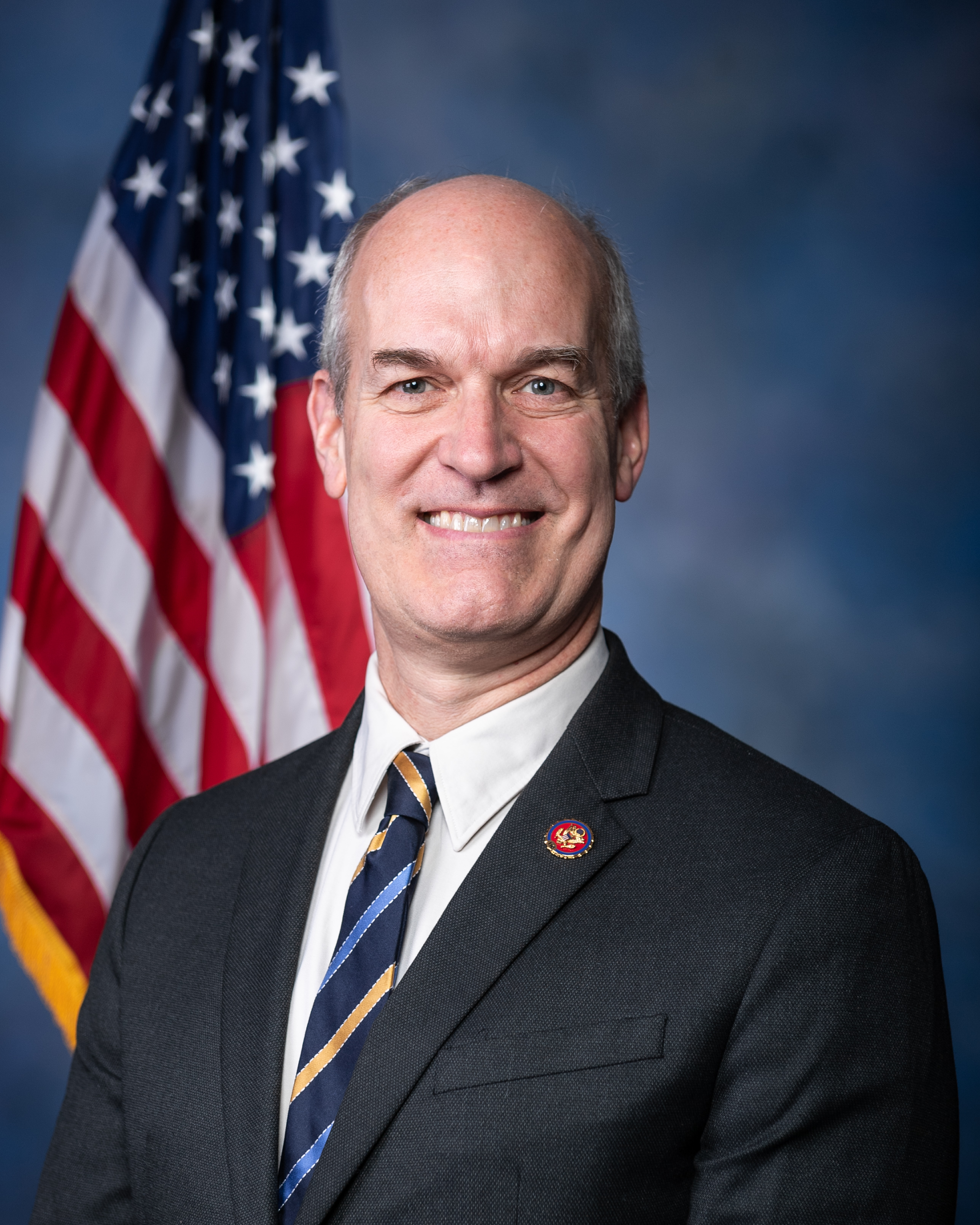
- Official portrait, 2019

Ranking Member of the House Transportation Committee
- Incumbent
- Assumed office January 3, 2023
- Preceded by: Sam Graves

Member of the U.S. House of Representatives from Washington's 2nd district
- Incumbent
- Assumed office January 3, 2001
- Preceded by: Jack Metcalf

Member of the Snohomish County Council from the 1st district
- In office January 1, 1998 – January 3, 2001
- Preceded by: John Garner
- Succeeded by: Mike Ashley

Personal details
- Born: Richard Ray Larsen; June 15, 1965 (age 61) Arlington, Washington, U.S.
- Party: Democratic
- Spouse: Tiia Karlén (m. 1994)
- Children: 2
- Education: Pacific Lutheran University (BA); University of Minnesota (MPA)
- Website: House website Campaign website
- Larsen's voice Larsen supporting the Federal Disaster Assistance Coordination Act. Recorded January 25, 2023

Richard Ray Larsen (born June 15, 1965) is an American politician serving as the United States representative for Washington's 2nd congressional district since 2001. A member of the Democratic Party, Larsen is the ranking member of the House Transportation and Infrastructure Committee.

== Early life, education, and career ==
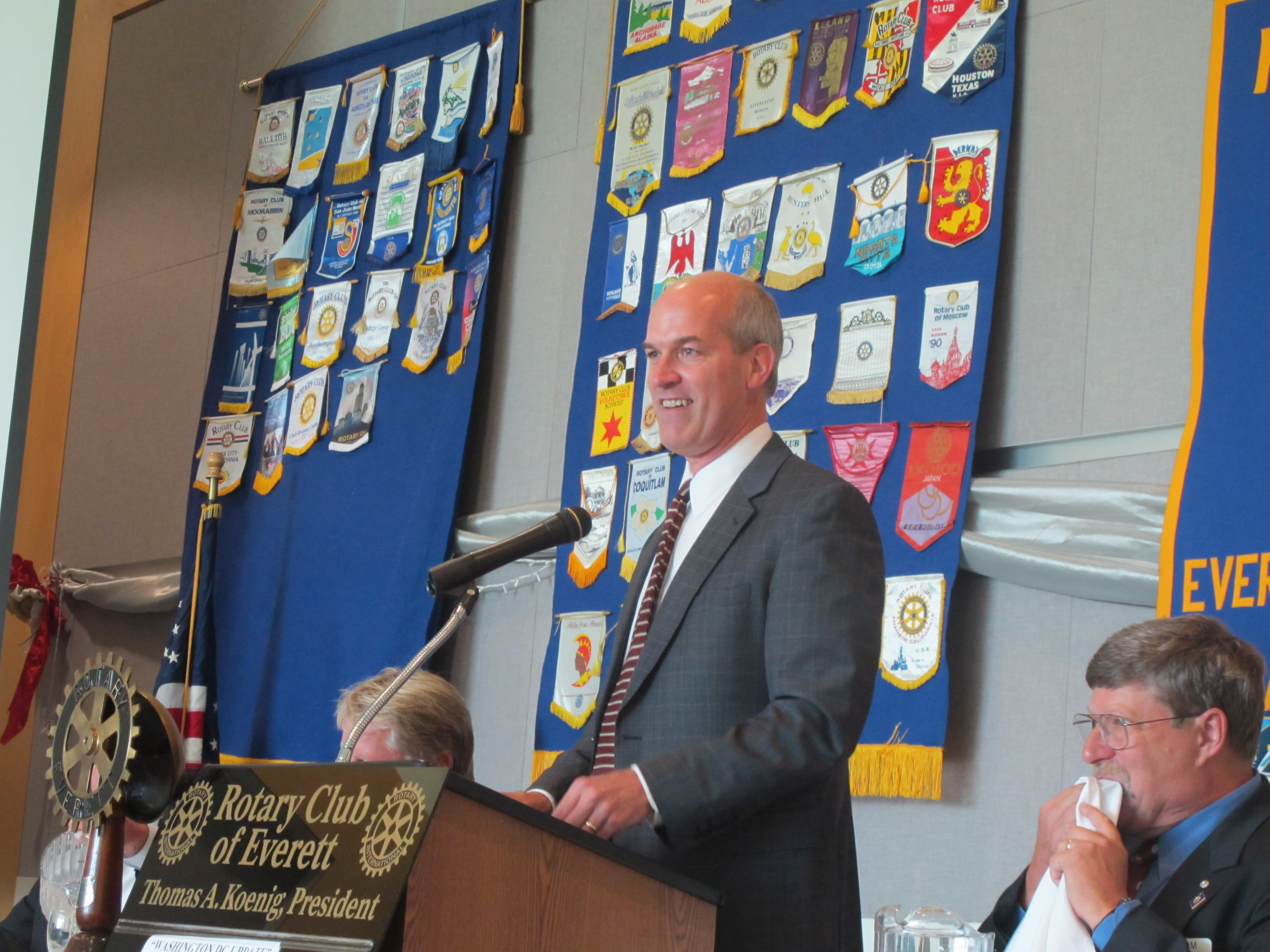
Larsen addressing a Rotary club meeting in Everett, Washington

Larsen was born and raised in Arlington, Washington, and graduated from Arlington High School. He played youth soccer and was later a ball boy for the original Seattle Sounders. Larsen attended Pacific Lutheran University and the University of Minnesota, earning a master's degree in public affairs. He formerly worked as director of public affairs for the Washington State Dental Association and as a lobbyist for the dental profession.

== U.S. House of Representatives ==
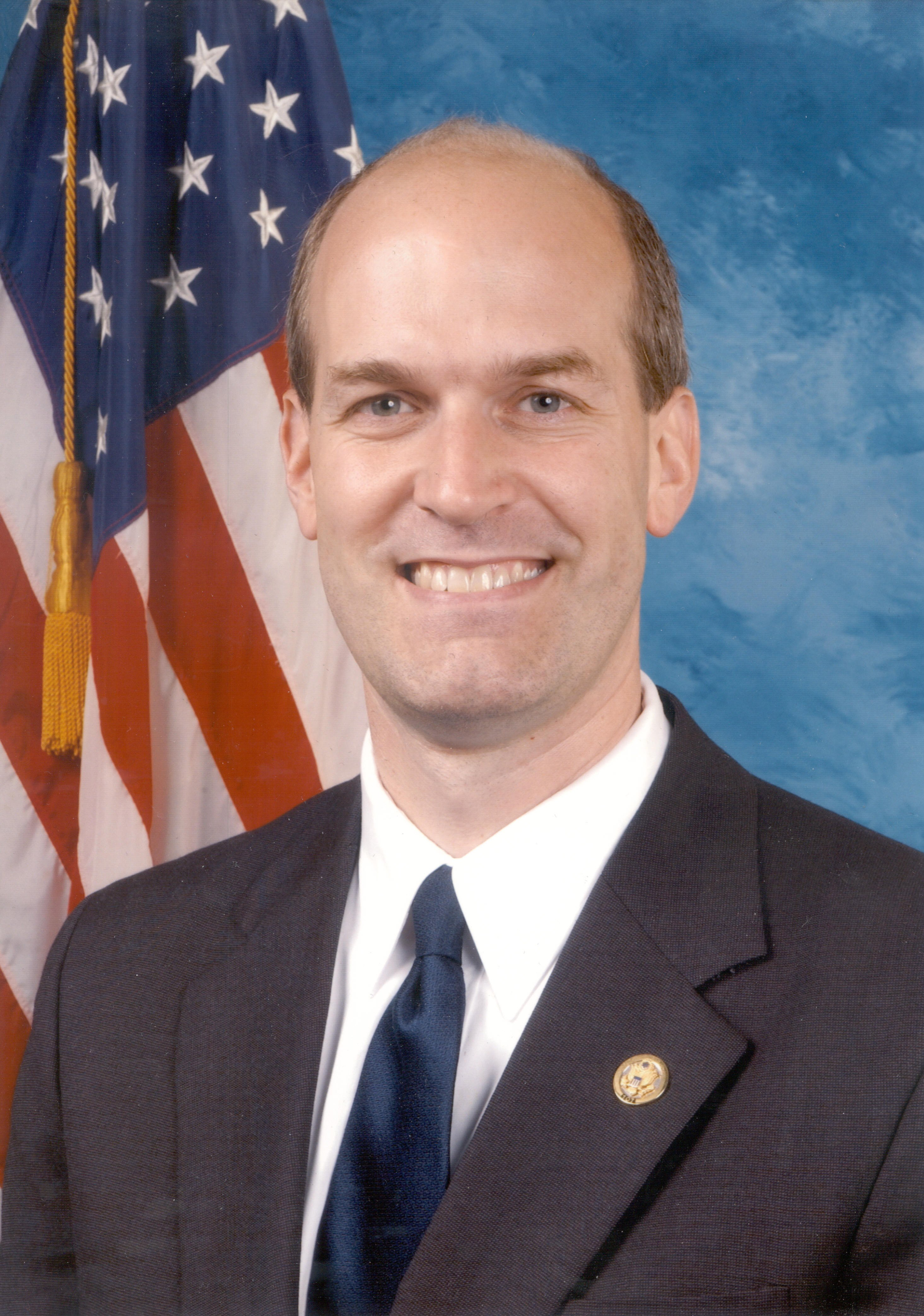
Larsen's freshman portrait

=== Committee assignments ===
For the 119th Congress:

- Committee on Transportation and Infrastructure (Ranking Member)

=== Caucus memberships ===
- Congressional Equality Caucus
- Black Maternal Health Caucus
- U.S.-China Working Group
- School Safety Caucus
- Caucus to Fight and Control Methamphetamine
- Congressional Arts Caucus
- Congressional Puget Sound Recovery Caucus
- Congressional NextGen 9-1-1 Caucus
- U.S.-Japan Caucus
- Congressional Solar Caucus
- New Democrat Coalition
- Congressional Wildlife Refuge Caucus
- APEC Caucus (Co-chair)
- Congressional Arctic Working Group (Co-chair)
- Soccer Caucus (Co-chair)

== Political positions ==
In 2006, CQPolitics wrote:

Larsen, a member of the centrist New Democrat Coalition in the House, has carved an image as a moderate that appeals to crucial swing voters in the politically competitive coastal district in the northwestern corner of Washington State. He still maintains support from centers surrounding the port cities of Everett and Bellingham.

In 2005, The American Prospect characterized Washington's 2nd congressional district as "traditionally Democratic" and contrasted that with Larsen's voting record at the time:

Larsen won this traditionally Democratic district last year almost 2 to 1. Yet Larsen's voting record doesn't reflect these numbers: He voted in favor of the bankruptcy bill crafted by the credit-card industry, the Bush administration's estate-tax repeal, and the tort "reform" bill supported by the U.S. Chamber of Commerce limiting the right to sue.

Larsen sits on the Transportation and Infrastructure Committee and formerly sat on the Armed Services Committee. He has raised $1.26 million from political action committees affiliated with the transportation industry and $560,000 from political action committees affiliated with the defense industry.

Larsen voted with President Joe Biden's stated position 100% of the time in the 117th Congress, according to a FiveThirtyEight analysis.

=== Abortion ===
Planned Parenthood, National Family Planning & Reproductive Health Association and NARAL Pro-Choice America have all highly rated Larsen's position on abortion. He has voted against several bills that would restrict abortion rights. In 2022, Larsen reaffirmed his support for abortion rights and their protections under Roe v. Wade, saying he would "continue to stand with women and advocates in Washington state and across the country to ensure a woman’s right to access safe reproductive health care."

=== Environment ===
Larsen voted for the 2009 American Clean Energy and Security Act known as "cap and trade". He has cosponsored legislation that would create the Wild Sky Wilderness area in his home district and is a member of the Congressional Wildlife Refuge Caucus.

On February 8, 2019, Larsen came out in opposition to the Green New Deal, saying:

I am not ready to support the Green New Deal resolution. It is difficult to support the resolution right now when one of the lead sponsors says one of the intentions is to make air travel unnecessary.

In 2020, Fuse Washington in its Progressive Voters Guide noted that Larsen does not support the Green New Deal and accepted political contributions from corporations including ExxonMobil "as recently as last year".

=== Healthcare reform ===
Larsen has supported the House Democratic proposal for the Affordable Care Act. He voted for the reform bill in November 2009. Larsen does not support single-payer health insurance. He has said he "thought it was more appropriate to stick with defending Obamacare, not to change in the middle of the controversy".

Larsen opposes Medicare for All and has said he supports the Public Option Deficit Reduction Act as an alternative. This proposal adds a public option to the Affordable Care Act using the same market-based exchanges while lowering premiums by only five to seven percent.

=== Impeachment ===
In 2007, Larsen opposed impeaching President George W. Bush, saying, "I believe the American people elected a Democratic majority to make positive changes in their lives. If we took up impeachment, we would do nothing else for the next 2 years. I don't think that's what we were elected to do". Larsen supported impeaching President Donald J. Trump on July 18, 2019.

=== War ===
Although Larsen initially voted against a bill authorizing military force in Iraq in October 2002, he also voted against an amendment that sought to have the United States work through the United Nations to resolve tensions instead of invading Iraq. In 2006, Larsen voted against requiring Congressional authorization for use of force in Iran, and in 2011 he voted for use of force in Libya.

Since 2002, Larsen has voted for nearly every bill put forth in the House concerning the wars in Iraq and Afghanistan. In 2006, the Seattle Post-Intelligencer described Larsen as a "strong advocate for providing money to support the [Iraq War]".

In 2006, Larsen voted to endorse the War in Iraq and against a mandated withdrawal plan. In 2008, he said that troops would be in Iraq "well into the next administration" and likely remain "for another 10 years". Larsen supported President Obama's proposed exit strategy, which promised to remove combat troops by summer of 2010.

=== Labor ===
Larsen voted for the S-Miner Act and Extending Federal Emergency Unemployment Benefits and Providing Business and Homebuyer Tax Credits bill. He showed support for the interests of the Utility Workers Union of America, Service Employees International Union, American Federation of State, County & Municipal Employees, and AFL–CIO. He claims to support Washington State's economy by investing in small- to medium-size businesses to help them succeed in the global economy.

In January 2014, Larsen faced criticism from the International Association of Machinists and Aerospace Workers for supporting Boeing's proposal to replace pensions with a 401(k)-style retirement plan.

=== Transportation ===
As a member of the House Transportation and Infrastructure Committee, Larsen has voted for every transportation bill since being reelected in 2008. He believes that "sound investments in transportation keep our economy moving" and improve conditions in other areas. Larsen was one of 79 cosponsors of the SAFETEA-LU bill to improve highways, increase funding for ferry systems, and expedite the flow of traffic and goods through border crossings.

== Political campaigns ==
=== 2006 ===
Larsen defeated Republican Doug Roulstone, a retired Navy officer from Snohomish, with 65% of the vote to Roulstone's 34%.

=== 2008 ===
Larsen was challenged in the Democratic primary during his 2008 reelection campaign by perennial candidate Glen Johnson. His Republican opponent for the House race was recently retired Snohomish County Sheriff Rick Bart.

For the 2008 election cycle, Larsen's campaign's total income was $1,336,438. His campaign spent $1,155,691. The companies that contributed the most money were Boeing Co., Microsoft Corp., American Dental Assn., McBee Strategic Consulting, and Puget Energy. The labor, finance/insurance/real estate, transportation, misc. business, and health sectors were the largest contributing sectors. The major industry donations came from health professionals, transportation unions, building trade unions, retired, and sea transport.

=== 2010 ===
Larsen narrowly defeated Republican nominee John Koster to win a sixth term.

Larsen was endorsed by the Seattle Post-Intelligencer on October 13, 2010.

=== 2012 ===
In 2012, Larsen won reelection with 61% of the vote to Republican nominee Dan Matthews's 39%.

=== 2016 ===
Larsen was challenged by Republican Marc Hennemann. Hennemann decided to challenge Larsen after receiving an answer he disliked to a question at a town hall meeting in Coupeville. Larsen defeated Hennemann, 64% to 36%.

== Electoral history ==
Washington's 2nd congressional district: Results 2000–2024
Year	Democrat	Votes	Pct	Republican	Votes	Pct	3rd Party	Party	Votes	Pct	3rd Party	Party	Votes	Pct
2000	Rick Larsen	146,617	50%	John Koster	134,660	46%	Stuart Andrews	Libertarian	7,672	3%	Glen S. Johnson	Natural Law	4,231	1%
2002	Rick Larsen	101,219	50%	Norma Smith	92,528	46%	Bruce Guthrie	Libertarian	4,326	2%	Bernard P. Haggerty	Green	4,077	2%
2004	Rick Larsen	202,383	64%	Suzanne Sinclair	106,333	34%	Bruce Guthrie	Libertarian	7,966	2%				
2006	Rick Larsen	157,064	64%	Doug Roulstone	87,730	36%								
2008	Rick Larsen	217,416	62%	Rick Bart	131,051	38%								
2010	Rick Larsen	155,241	51%	John Koster	148,722	49%								
2012	Rick Larsen	184,826	61%	Dan Matthews	117,465	39%								
2014	Rick Larsen	67,812	62%	B.J. Guillot	41,889	38%								
2016	Rick Larsen	208,314	64%	Marc Hennemann	117,094	36%								
2018	Rick Larsen	210,187	71%				Brian Luke	Libertarian	84,646	29%				
2020	Rick Larsen	255,252	63%	Timothy S. Hazelo	148,384	37%								
2022	Rick Larsen	202,980	60%	Dan Matthews	134,335	40%								
2024	Rick Larsen	263,750	64%	Cody Hart	148,167	36%								

== Personal life ==
Larsen married Tiia Ingrid Karlen in 1994. They have two children. He shares a birthday with fellow Washington State representative Adam Smith.

U.S. House of Representatives
Preceded by Jack Metcalf	Member of the U.S. House of Representatives from Washington's 2nd congressional district 2001–present	Incumbent
U.S. order of precedence (ceremonial)
Preceded by Sam Graves	United States representatives by seniority 33rd	Succeeded by Betty McCollum
Preceded by Betty McCollum	Order of precedence of the United States	Succeeded by Stephen Lynch
