= Doug Roulstone =

American politician from Washington

Member of the Washington House of Representatives from the 44th district
- In office September 26, 2014 – November 25, 2014
- Preceded by: Mike Hope
- Succeeded by: Mark Harmsworth

Personal details
- Born: January 11, 1950 (age 76) Portsmouth, Virginia, U.S.
- Party: Republican
- Spouse: Bonnie Roulstone
- Children: 2
- Education: United States Naval Academy (BS)

Military service
- Allegiance: United States
- Branch/service: United States Navy
- Rank: Captain

Douglas R. Roulstone (born January 11, 1950) is a former United States Navy officer. He served for two months in the Washington House of Representatives. A Republican, he was appointed on September 26, 2014, by Governor Jay Inslee to serve out the unexpired term of Mike Hope, who resigned in July. He was local Republican leaders' third choice for appointment to Hope's seat. He served until the certification of Mark Harmsworth as the winner of the November 4, 2014, general election, on November 25.

Roulstone is a retired Navy captain. He lives in Snohomish. He previously ran for the United States House of Representatives in 2006, losing to incumbent Democrat Rick Larsen. He was a candidate in the 44th Legislative District state senate race for 2018, garnering 44% of the vote against incumbent Democrat Steve Hobbs.
