= Mike Hope =

American politician

Member of the Washington House of Representatives from the 44th district
- In office January 12, 2009 – July 24, 2014
- Preceded by: Liz Loomis
- Succeeded by: Doug Roulstone

Personal details
- Born: Cleveland, Ohio
- Party: Republican

Michael S. Hope is an American politician and member of the Republican Party from the state of Washington. He served as a member of the Washington House of Representatives, representing the 44th district.

Hope was born in Cleveland Ohio and graduated with a B.A. in Sociology from John Carroll University and an M.A in Policy Studies at the University of Washington. He served in the United States Marine Corps Reserve from 1994 to 2001.

A former Seattle police officer, he was first elected to the State House in 2008, narrowly defeating Democratic incumbent Liz Loomis. A moderate Republican, he was easily re-elected in 2010 and 2012. In 2013, he was the lone House Republican to support a bill expanding background checks on most sales of private handguns.

In 2011, he ran for Snohomish County Executive but was defeated by Democratic incumbent Aaron Reardon. Hope, who was not running for re-election in 2014, resigned on July 24 after the revelation that he has been registered to vote in both Washington and Ohio since 2013.

Hope has also worked as a personal trainer.

== Awards and honors ==
- 2012 Legislator of the Year, Association of Public Safety Communication Officials
- 4 Time Winner (2009, 2010, 2011, 2012) Cornerstone Award from the Association of Washington Business
- 3 Time Winner (2009, 2011, 2011) Guardian of Small Business, National Federation of Small Business (NFIB)
- 2011 Legislator of the Year Award, Council of Metropolitan Police and Sheriffs
- 2010 Legislator of the Year Award, Washington Association of Police and Sheriffs
- 2010 Lake Stevens School District Service Award
- 2009 Lake Stevens Journal Most Inspiring People of the Year
- 2009 Distinguished Alumni Award, University of Washington- Bothell
- 2009 Business Champion Award, Joint Government Affairs Committee (Everett, South Snohomish County and Monroe Chambers of Commerce)
