= 2006 United States House of Representatives elections in Washington =

- November 7, 2006

All 9 Washington seats to the United States House of Representatives
	Majority party	Minority party
Party	Democratic	Republican
Last election	6	3
Seats won	6	3
Seat change	Steady	Steady
Popular vote	1,320,238	721,862
Percentage	64.27%	35.14%
Swing	▲5.34%	▼4.99%

Democratic
50–60%
60–70%
70–80%
Republican
50–60%
60–70%

Elections were held in Washington state in 2006 for seats in the United States House of Representatives. Of the nine congressional districts, six were won by Democrats and three by Republicans, with the Democrats taking 64% of the vote.

== Overview ==
United States House of Representatives elections in Washington, 2006
Party	Votes	Percentage	Seats	+/–
Democratic	1,320,238	64.27%	6	—
Republican	721,862	35.14%	3	—
Independents	11,956	0.58%	0	—
Totals	2,054,056	100.00%	2	—

== District 1 ==
2006 Washington's 1st congressional district election
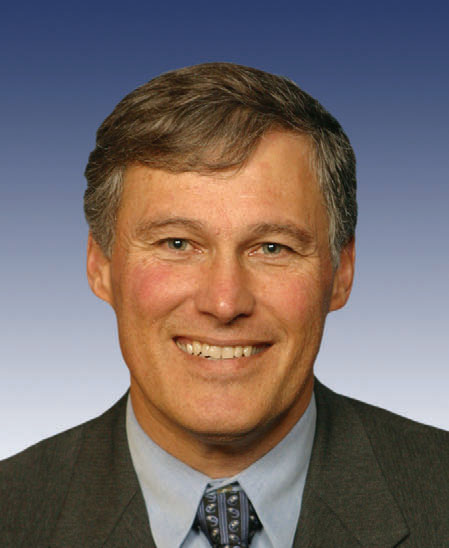

Nominee	Jay Inslee	Larry Ishmael
Party	Democratic	Republican
Popular vote	163,832	78,105
Percentage	67.7%	32.3%
- County results Inslee: 60–70%
U.S. Representative before election
Jay Inslee (inc.)
Democratic
Elected U.S. Representative
Jay Inslee
Democratic

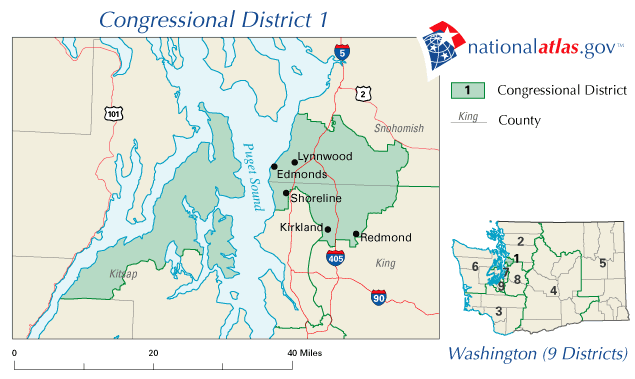

Incumbent Democratic Congressman Jay Inslee easily dispatched Republican challenger Larry Ishmael to win a sixth term.

=== Endorsements ===
Jay Inslee (D)

Organizations

- Sierra Club Washington

==== Predictions ====
Source	Ranking	As of
The Cook Political Report	Safe D	November 6, 2006
Rothenberg	Safe D	November 6, 2006
Sabato's Crystal Ball	Safe D	November 6, 2006
Real Clear Politics	Safe D	November 7, 2006
CQ Politics	Safe D	November 7, 2006

==== Results ====
2006 Washington's 1st congressional district election
Party	Candidate	Votes	%
Democratic	Jay Inslee (inc.)	163,832	67.72
Republican	Larry Ishmael	78,105	32.28
Total votes		241,937	100.00
Democratic hold			

==== By county ====
County results
County	Jay Inslee Democratic		Larry Ishmael Republican		Margin		Total votes
County	#	%	#	%	#	%	Total votes
King (part)	61,315	69.59%	26,789	30.41%	34,526	39.19%	88,104
Kitsap (part)	31,935	67.32%	15,506	32.68%	16,429	34.63%	47,441
Snohomish (part)	70,582	66.34%	35,810	33.66%	34,772	32.68%	106,392
Totals	163,832	67.72%	78,105	32.28%	85,727	35.43%	241,937

== District 2 ==
2006 Washington's 2nd congressional district election

Nominee	Rick Larsen	Doug Roulstone
Party	Democratic	Republican
Popular vote	157,064	87,730
Percentage	64.2%	35.8%
- County results Larsen: 60–70% 70–80%
U.S. Representative before election
Rick Larsen (inc.)
Democratic
Elected U.S. Representative
Rick Larsen
Democratic

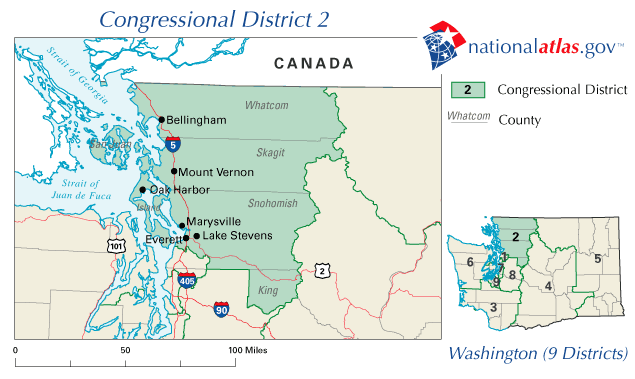

Democratic incumbent Congressman Rick Larsen defeated his Republican opponent, U.S. Navy veteran Doug Roulstone by a solid margin.

=== Endorsements ===
Rick Larsen (D)

Organizations

- Sierra Club Washington

==== Predictions ====
Source	Ranking	As of
The Cook Political Report	Likely D	November 6, 2006
Rothenberg	Safe D	November 6, 2006
Sabato's Crystal Ball	Safe D	November 6, 2006
Real Clear Politics	Safe D	November 7, 2006
CQ Politics	Likely D	November 7, 2006

==== Results ====
2006 Washington's 2nd congressional district election
Party	Candidate	Votes	%
Democratic	Rick Larsen (inc.)	157,064	64.16
Republican	Doug Roulstone	87,730	35.84
Total votes		244,794	100.00
Democratic hold			

==== By county ====
County	Rick Larsen Democratic		Doug Roulstone Republican		Margin		Total votes cast
County	#	%	#	%	#	%	Total votes cast
Island	18,838	63.33%	10,906	36.67%	7,932	26.67%	29,744
King (part)	150	71.09%	61	28.91%	89	42.18%	211
San Juan	5,908	72.90%	2,196	27.10%	3,712	45.80%	8,104
Skagit	26,150	64.36%	14,483	35.64%	11,667	28.71%	40,633
Snohomish (part)	61,433	62.87%	36,275	37.13%	25,158	25.75%	97,708
Whatcom	44,585	65.09%	23,809	34.91%	20,677	30.19%	68,493
Totals	157,064	64.16%	87,730	35.84%	69,334	28.32%	244,794

== District 3 ==
2006 Washington's 3rd congressional district election
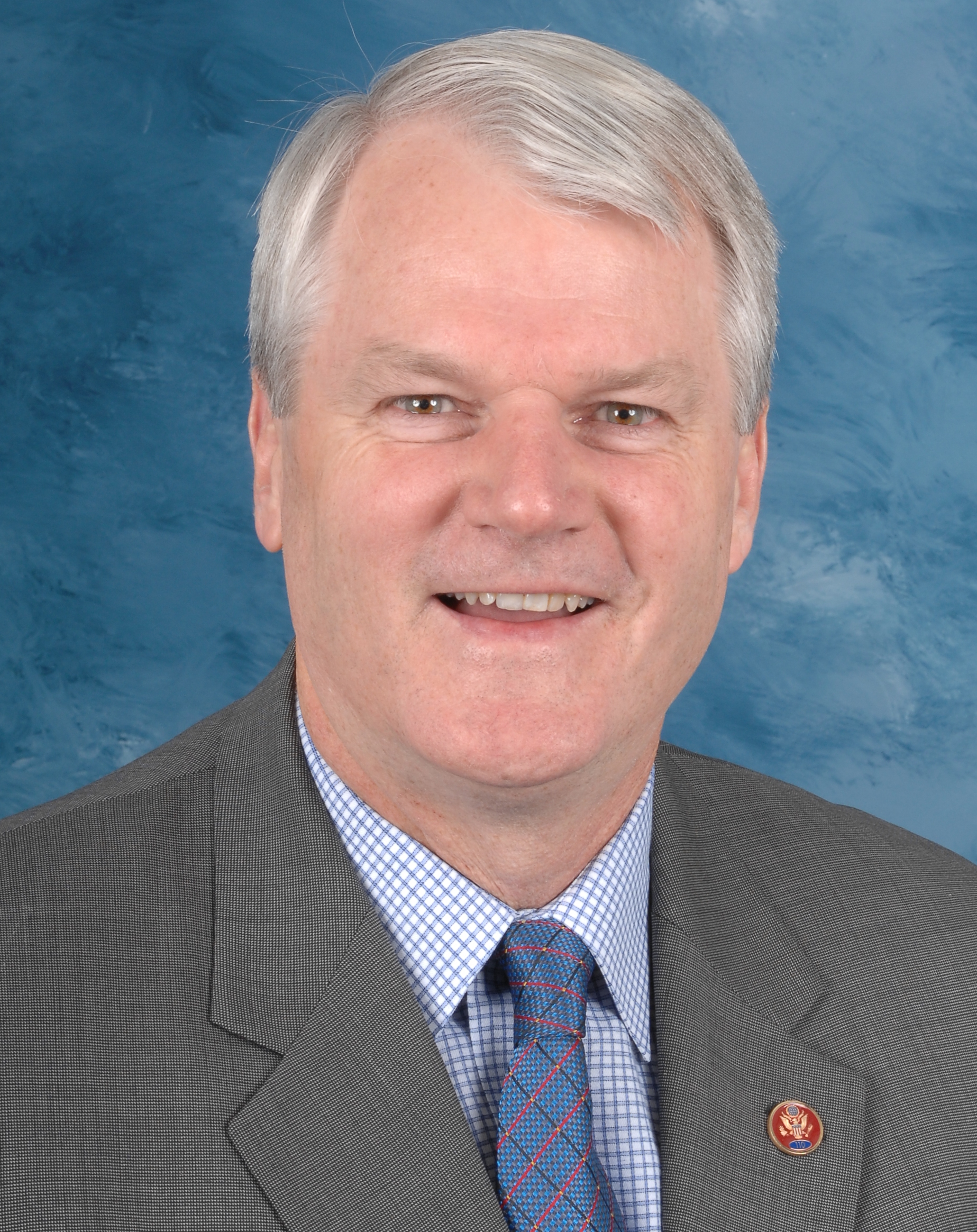

Nominee	Brian Baird	Michael Messmore
Party	Democratic	Republican
Popular vote	147,065	85,915
Percentage	63.1%	36.9%
- County results Baird: 50–60% 60–70% 70–80%
U.S. Representative before election
Brian Baird
Democratic
Elected U.S. Representative
Brian Baird
Democratic

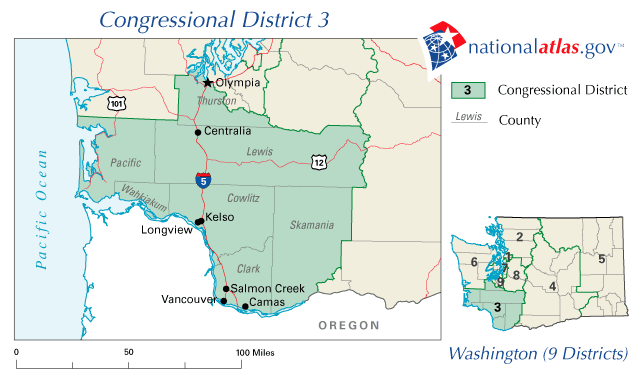

In a slight improvement over his 2004 performance, incumbent Democratic Congressman Brian Baird easily won a fifth term over Republican challenger Michael Messmore.

=== Endorsements ===
Brian Baird (D)

Organizations

- Sierra Club Washington

==== Predictions ====
Source	Ranking	As of
The Cook Political Report	Safe D	November 6, 2006
Rothenberg	Safe D	November 6, 2006
Sabato's Crystal Ball	Safe D	November 6, 2006
Real Clear Politics	Safe D	November 7, 2006
CQ Politics	Safe D	November 7, 2006

==== Results ====
2006 Washington's 3rd congressional district election
Party	Candidate	Votes	%
Democratic	Brian Baird (inc.)	147,065	63.12
Republican	Michael Messmore	85,915	36.88
Total votes		232,980	100.00
Democratic hold			

==== By county ====
County results
County	Brian Baird Democratic		Michael Messmore Republican		Margin		Total votes
County	#	%	#	%	#	%	Total votes
Clark	68,879	60.21%	45,515	39.79%	23,364	20.42%	114,394
Cowlitz	20,710	66.77%	10,309	33.23%	10,401	33.53%	31,019
Lewis	13,888	55.64%	11,071	44.36%	2,817	11.29%	24,959
Pacific	6,305	73.05%	2,326	26.95%	3,979	46.10%	8,631
Skamania (part)	1,743	61.14%	1,108	38.86%	635	22.27%	2,851
Thurston (part)	34,310	69.57%	15,008	30.43%	19,302	39.14%	49,318
Wahkiakum	1,230	68.03%	578	31.97%	652	36.06%	1,808
Totals	147,065	63.12%	85,915	36.88%	61,150	26.25%	232,980

== District 4 ==
2006 Washington's 4th congressional district election
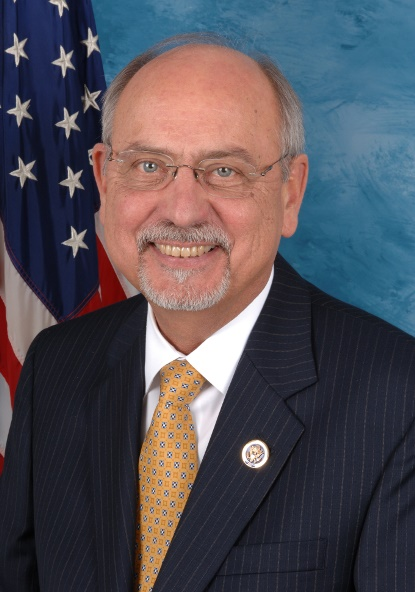

Nominee	Doc Hastings	Richard Wright
Party	Republican	Democratic
Popular vote	115,246	77,054
Percentage	59.9%	40.1%
- County results Hastings: 50–60% 60–70% Wright: 50–60%
U.S. Representative before election
Doc Hastings (inc.)
Republican
Elected U.S. Representative
Doc Hastings
Republican

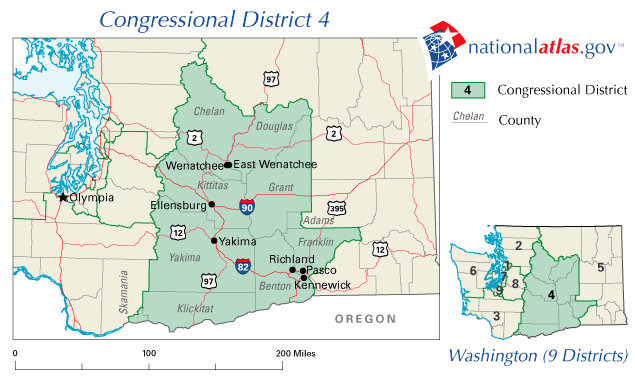

In his bid for a seventh term, Republican incumbent Congressman Doc Hastings beat back a spirited challenge from Democratic nominee Richard Wright. Though Hastings eventually beat Wright by a fairly solid margin, it was not the kind of landslide that Hastings usually experienced in this strongly conservative district based in Central Washington.

=== Predictions ===
Source	Ranking	As of
The Cook Political Report	Safe R	November 6, 2006
Rothenberg	Safe R	November 6, 2006
Sabato's Crystal Ball	Safe R	November 6, 2006
Real Clear Politics	Safe R	November 7, 2006
CQ Politics	Safe R	November 7, 2006

=== Results ===
2006 Washington's 4th congressional district election
Party	Candidate	Votes	%
Republican	Doc Hastings (inc.)	115,246	59.93
Democratic	Richard Wright	77,054	40.07
Total votes		192,300	100.00
Republican hold			

==== By county ====
County results
County	Doc Hastings Republican		Richard Wright Democratic		Margin		Total votes
County	#	%	#	%	#	%	Total votes
Adams (part)	1,066	63.19%	621	36.81%	445	26.38%	1,687
Benton	29,915	60.88%	19,225	39.12%	10,690	21.75%	49,140
Chelan	14,086	61.67%	8,755	38.33%	5,331	23.34%	22,841
Douglas	7,056	64.22%	3,931	35.78%	3,125	28.44%	10,987
Franklin	7,950	62.10%	4,851	37.90%	3,099	24.21%	12,801
Grant	13,152	66.92%	6,501	33.08%	6,651	33.84%	19,653
Kittitas	6,725	55.36%	5,423	44.64%	1,302	10.72%	12,148
Klickitat	4,158	56.80%	3,162	43.20%	996	13.61%	7,320
Skamania (part)	530	47.11%	595	52.89%	-65	-5.78%	1,125
Yakima	30,608	56.06%	23,990	43.94%	6,618	12.12%	54,598
Totals	115,246	59.93%	77,054	40.07%	38,192	19.86%	192,300

== District 5 ==
2006 Washington's 5th congressional district election
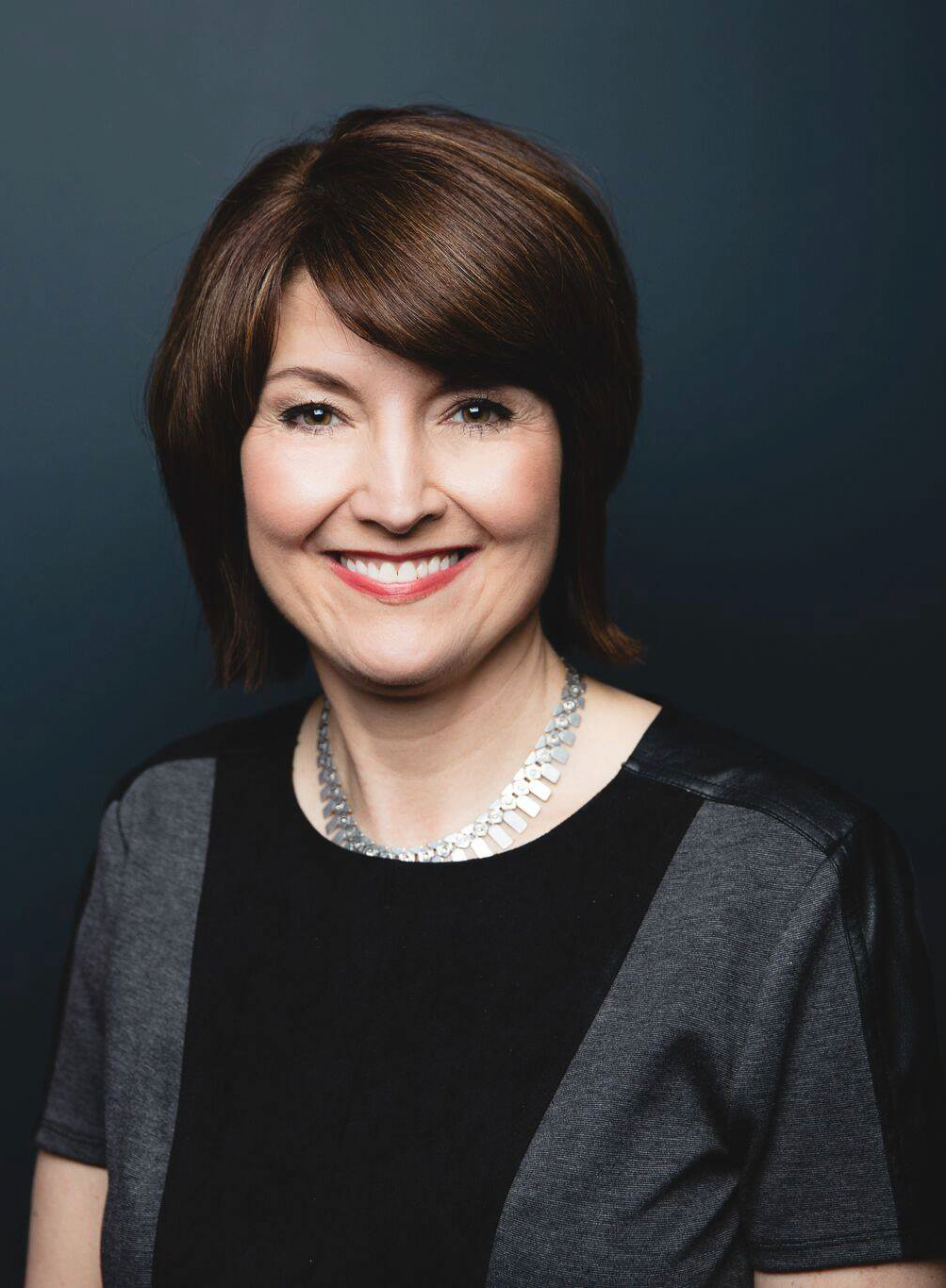

Nominee	Cathy McMorris Rodgers	Peter J. Goldmark
Party	Republican	Democratic
Popular vote	134,967	104,357
Percentage	56.4%	43.6%
- County results McMorris: 50–60% 60–70% 70–80%
U.S. Representative before election
Cathy McMorris Rodgers (inc.)
Republican
Elected U.S. Representative
Cathy McMorris Rodgers
Republican

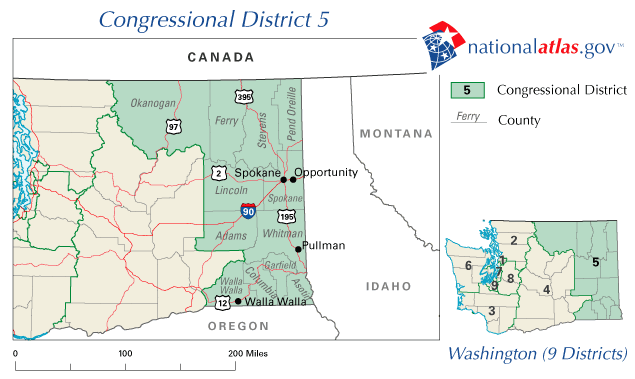

Like neighboring Congressman Hastings, incumbent Republican Congresswoman Cathy McMorris Rodgers faced a surprisingly strong challenge from Democratic nominee Peter J. Goldmark in her conservative, Eastern Washington district. Though Rodgers ultimately edged Goldmark out by a comfortable margin, the race got close enough for CQ Politics to change its rating on the race to Republican Favored from Safe Republican.

=== Predictions ===
Source	Ranking	As of
The Cook Political Report	Likely R	November 6, 2006
Rothenberg	Safe R	November 6, 2006
Sabato's Crystal Ball	Lean R	November 6, 2006
Real Clear Politics	Safe R	November 7, 2006
CQ Politics	Likely R	November 7, 2006

=== Results ===
2006 Washington's 5th congressional district election
Party	Candidate	Votes	%
Republican	Cathy McMorris Rodgers (inc.)	134,967	56.40
Democratic	Peter J. Goldmark	104,357	43.60
Total votes		239,324	100.00
Republican hold			

==== By county ====
County results
County	Cathy McMorris Rodgers Republican		Peter J. Goldmark Democratic		Margin		Total votes
County	#	%	#	%	#	%	Total votes
Adams (part)	1,372	70.90%	563	29.10%	809	41.81%	1,935
Asotin	4,089	56.24%	3,181	43.76%	908	12.49%	7,270
Columbia	1,302	67.88%	616	32.12%	686	35.77%	1,918
Ferry	1,777	63.53%	1,020	36.47%	757	27.06%	2,797
Garfield	816	69.51%	358	30.49%	458	39.01%	1,174
Lincoln	2,988	62.60%	1,785	37.40%	1,203	25.20%	4,773
Okanogan	7,033	54.55%	5,859	45.45%	1,174	9.11%	12,892
Pend Oreille	3,002	58.40%	2,138	41.60%	864	16.81%	5,140
Spokane	84,041	54.62%	69,821	45.38%	14,220	9.24%	153,862
Stevens	10,641	62.72%	6,325	37.28%	4,316	25.44%	16,966
Walla Walla	11,134	62.88%	6,574	37.12%	4,560	25.75%	17,708
Whitman	6,772	52.54%	6,117	47.46%	655	5.08%	12,889
Totals	134,967	56.40%	104,357	43.60%	30,610	12.79%	239,324

== District 6 ==
2006 Washington's 6th congressional district election
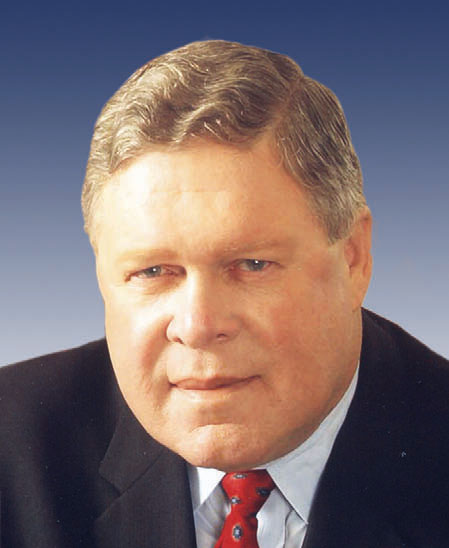

Nominee	Norm Dicks	Doug Cloud
Party	Democratic	Republican
Popular vote	158,202	65,883
Percentage	70.6%	29.4%
- County results Dicks: 60–70% 70–80%
U.S. Representative before election
Norm Dicks (inc.)
Democratic
Elected U.S. Representative
Norm Dicks
Democratic

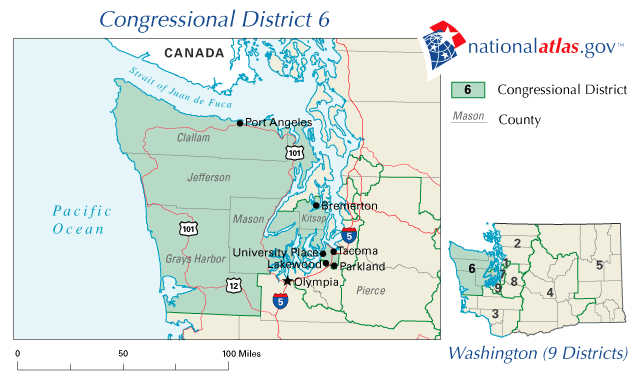

Long-serving Democratic incumbent Norm Dicks, a high-ranking member on the Appropriations Committee did not face a credible challenge to his bid for a sixteenth term from conservative activist Doug Cloud in this liberal, Kitsap Peninsula-based district.

=== Endorsements ===
Norm Dicks (D)

Organizations

- Sierra Club Washington

==== Predictions ====
Source	Ranking	As of
The Cook Political Report	Safe D	November 6, 2006
Rothenberg	Safe D	November 6, 2006
Sabato's Crystal Ball	Safe D	November 6, 2006
Real Clear Politics	Safe D	November 7, 2006
CQ Politics	Safe D	November 7, 2006

==== Results ====
2006 Washington's 6th congressional district election
Party	Candidate	Votes	%
Democratic	Norm Dicks (inc.)	158,202	70.60
Republican	Doug Cloud	65,883	29.40
Total votes		224,085	100.00
Democratic hold			

==== By county ====
County results
County	Norm Dicks Democratic		Doug Cloud Republican		Margin		Total votes
County	#	%	#	%	#	%	Total votes
Clallam	18,223	61.09%	11,609	38.91%	6,614	22.17%	29,832
Grays Harbor	15,774	73.13%	5,796	26.87%	9,978	46.26%	21,570
Jefferson	11,813	75.06%	3,926	24.94%	7,887	50.11%	15,739
Kitsap (part)	30,041	72.40%	11,451	27.60%	18,590	44.80%	41,492
Mason	14,591	69.75%	6,329	30.25%	8,262	39.49%	20,920
Pierce (part)	67,760	71.68%	26,772	28.32%	40,988	43.36%	94,532
Totals	158,202	70.60%	65,883	29.40%	92,319	41.20%	224,085

== District 7 ==
2006 Washington's 7th congressional district election
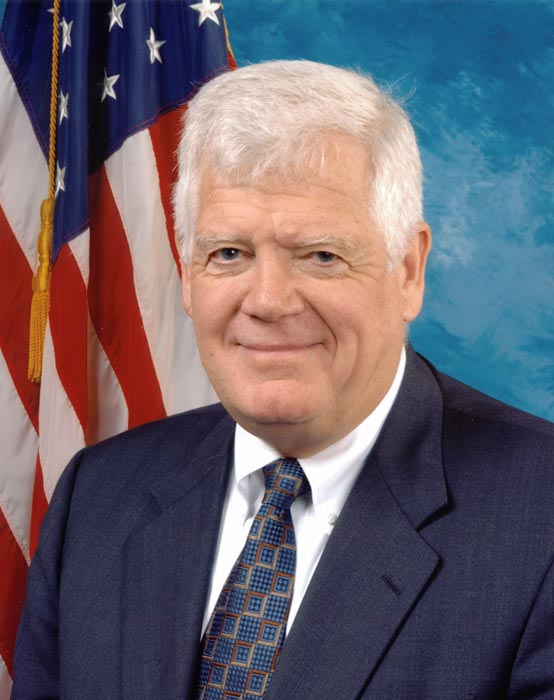

Nominee	Jim McDermott	Steve Beren
Party	Democratic	Republican
Popular vote	195,462	38,715
Percentage	79.4%	15.7%
- County results McDermott: 70–80%
U.S. Representative before election
Jim McDermott (inc.)
Democratic
Elected U.S. Representative
Jim McDermott
Democratic

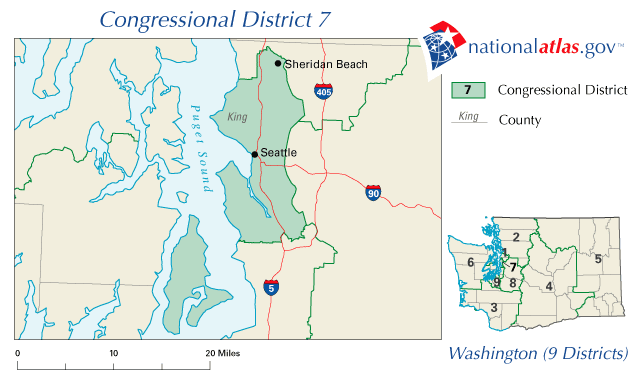

In his bid for a ninth term, incumbent Democratic Congressman Jim McDermott easily beat out Republican nominee Steve Beren and independent Linnea S. Noreen in this very liberal, Seattle-based district.

=== Endorsements ===
Jim McDermott (D)

Organizations

- Sierra Club Washington

==== Predictions ====
Source	Ranking	As of
The Cook Political Report	Safe D	November 6, 2006
Rothenberg	Safe D	November 6, 2006
Sabato's Crystal Ball	Safe D	November 6, 2006
Real Clear Politics	Safe D	November 7, 2006
CQ Politics	Safe D	November 7, 2006

==== Results ====
2006 Washington's 7th congressional district election
Party	Candidate	Votes	%
Democratic	Jim McDermott (inc.)	195,462	79.41
Republican	Steve Beren	38,715	15.73
Independent	Linnea S. Noreen	11,956	4.86
Total votes		246,133	100.00
Democratic hold			

==== By county ====
County results
County	Jim McDermott Democratic		Steve Beren Republican		Linnea S. Noreen Independent		Margin		Total votes
County	#	%	#	%	#	%	#	%	Total votes
King (part)	195,462	79.41%	38,715	15.73%	11,956	4.86%	156,747	63.68%	246,133
Totals	195,462	79.41%	38,715	15.73%	11,956	4.86%	156,747	63.68%	246,133

== District 8 ==
2006 Washington's 8th congressional district election
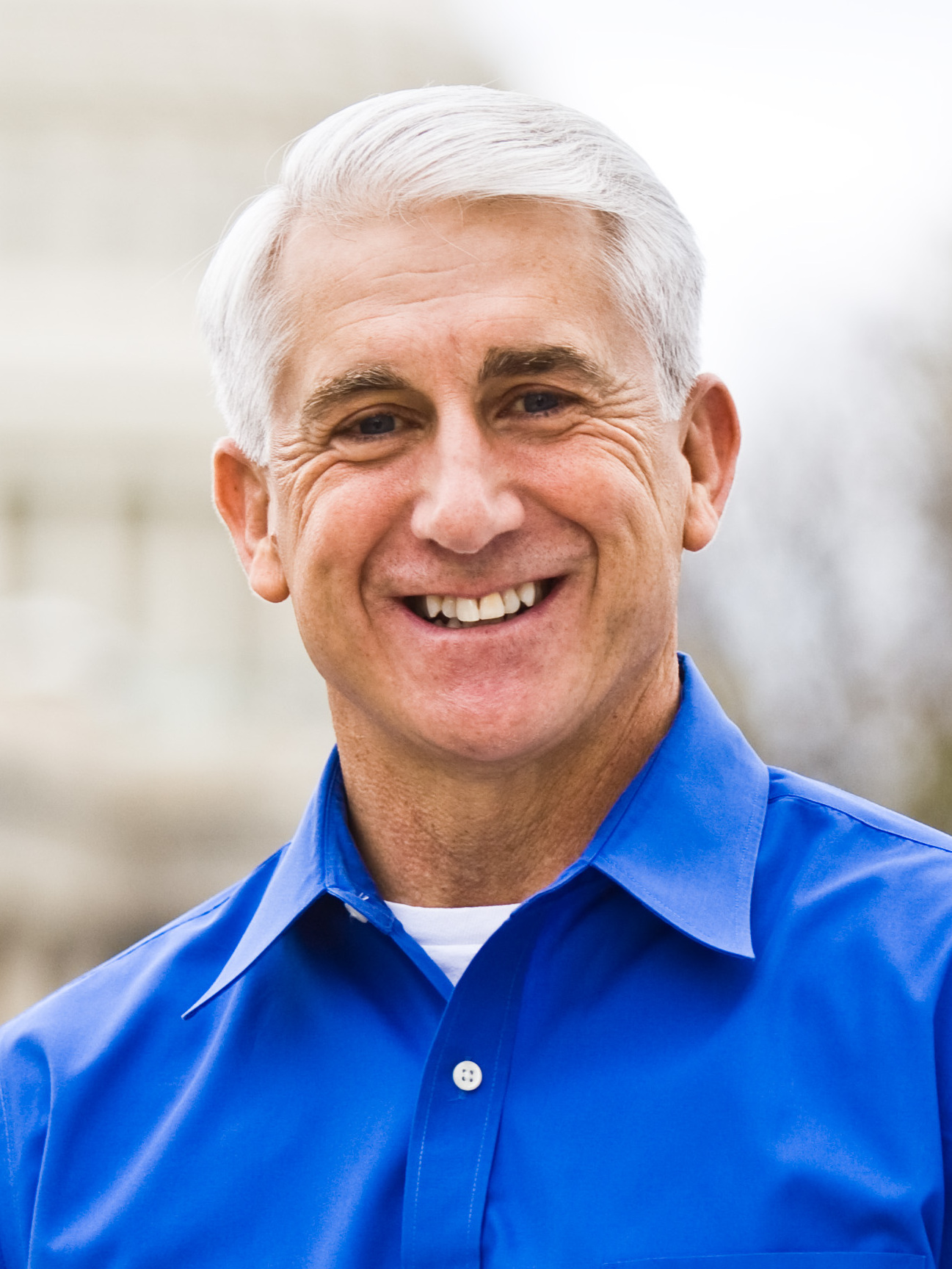

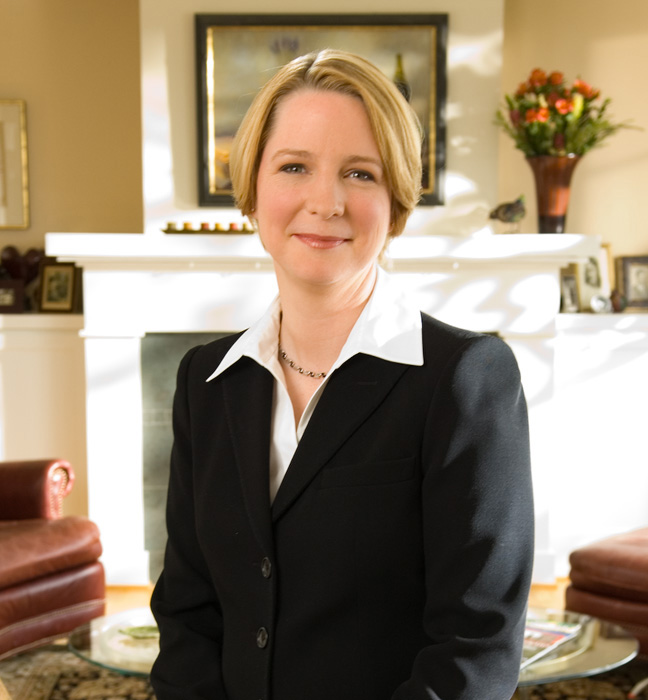
Nominee	Dave Reichert	Darcy Burner
Party	Republican	Democratic
Popular vote	129,362	122,021
Percentage	51.5%	48.5%
- County results Reichert: 50–60%
U.S. Representative before election
Dave Reichert (inc.)
Republican
Elected U.S. Representative
Dave Reichert
Republican

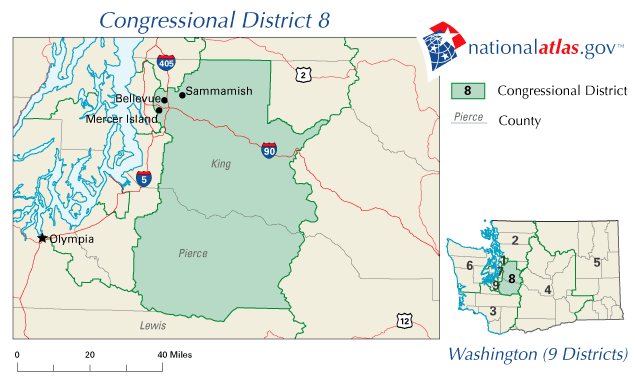

In 2004, then-King County Sheriff Dave Reichert won his first campaign for the United States House of Representatives by a five-point margin. 2006 proved to be just as tough of a year for Reichert. Facing former Microsoft executive Darcy Burner for the first time, Reichert faced a grueling battle for re-election. Polls taken in October showed the two candidates to be about even and the two major newspapers in the area—the Seattle Post-Intelligencer and the Seattle Times—split their endorsements: The Post-Intelligencer endorsed Burner while the Times supported Reichert. Ultimately, though, a few weeks after election day, it became evident that Reichert had beaten out Burner and had won a second term.

=== Endorsements ===
Darcy Burner (D)

Organizations

- Sierra Club Washington

Individuals

- Wesley Clark, General, 2004 democratic presidential candidate

==== Predictions ====
Source	Ranking	As of
The Cook Political Report	Lean R	November 6, 2006
Rothenberg	Tilt R	November 6, 2006
Sabato's Crystal Ball	Tilt R	November 6, 2006
Real Clear Politics	Lean R	November 7, 2006
CQ Politics	Tossup	November 7, 2006

==== Results ====
2006 Washington's 8th congressional district election
Party	Candidate	Votes	%
Republican	Dave Reichert (inc.)	129,362	51.46
Democratic	Darcy Burner	122,021	48.54
Total votes		251,383	100.00
Republican hold			

==== By county ====
County results
County	Dave Reichert Republican		Darcy Burner Democratic		Margin		Total votes
County	#	%	#	%	#	%	Total votes
King (part)	102,116	50.07%	101,812	49.93%	304	0.15%	203,928
Pierce (part)	27,246	57.41%	20,209	42.59%	7,037	14.83%	47,455
Totals	129,362	51.46%	122,021	48.54%	7,341	2.92%	251,383

== District 9 ==
2006 Washington's 9th congressional district election
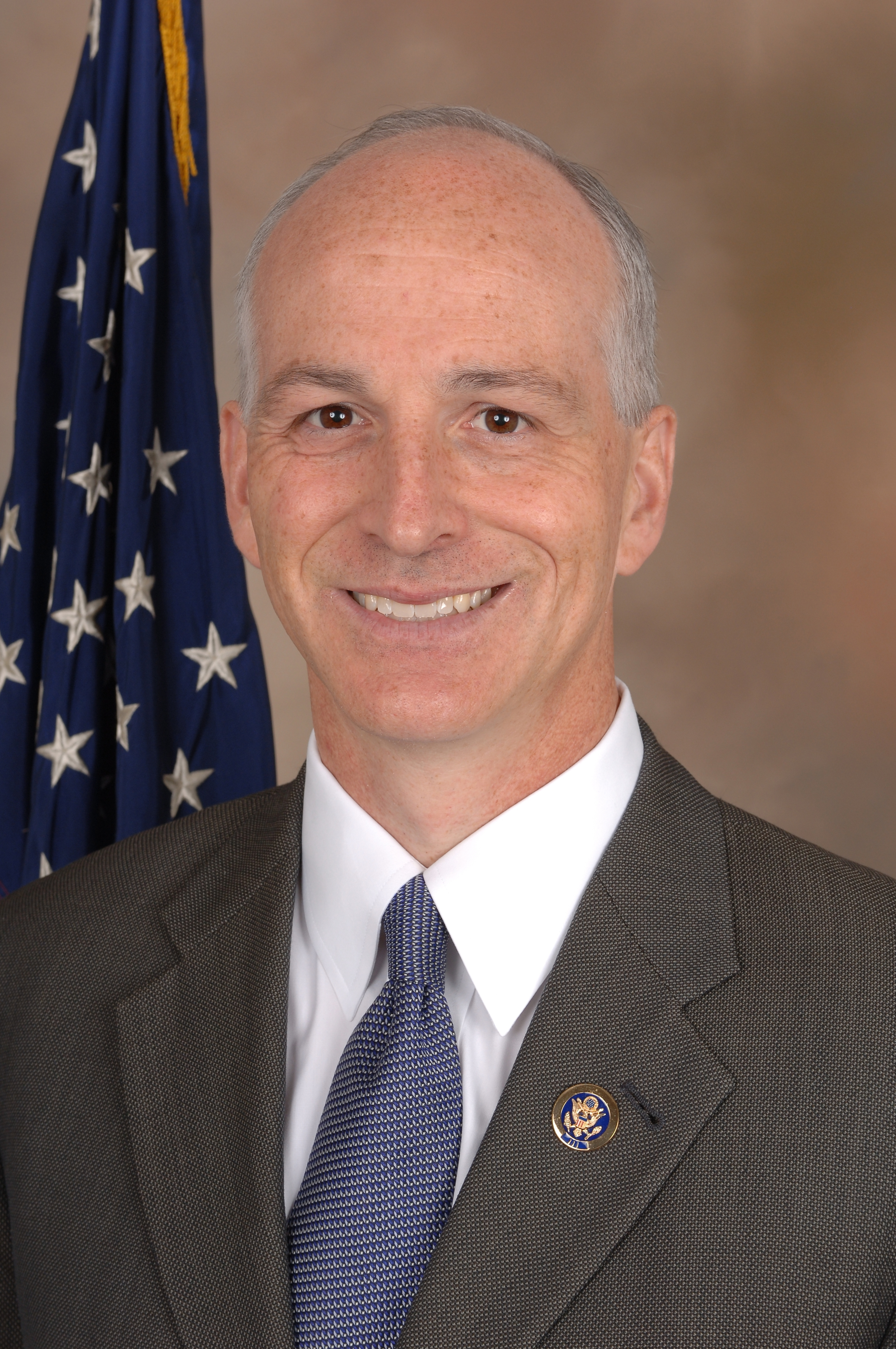

Nominee	Adam Smith	Steven C. Cofchin
Party	Democratic	Republican
Popular vote	119,038	62,082
Percentage	65.7%	34.3%
- County results Smith: 60–70%
U.S. Representative before election
Adam Smith (inc.)
Democratic
Elected U.S. Representative
Adam Smith
Democratic

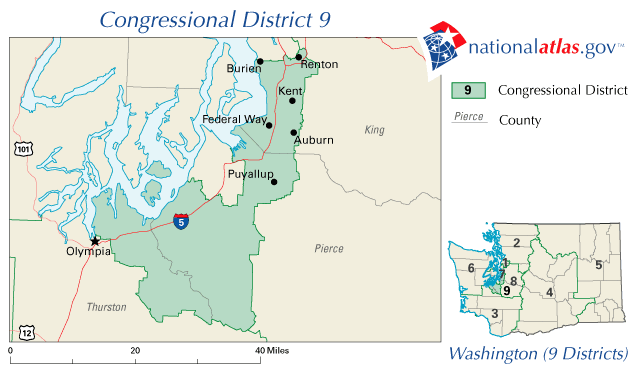

Incumbent Democratic Congressman Adam Smith easily beat out Republican candidate Steven Cofchin for a sixth term in this Western Washington district based in the Puget Sound.

=== Endorsements ===
Adam Smith (D)

Organizations

- Sierra Club Washington

==== Predictions ====
Source	Ranking	As of
The Cook Political Report	Safe D	November 6, 2006
Rothenberg	Safe D	November 6, 2006
Sabato's Crystal Ball	Safe D	November 6, 2006
Real Clear Politics	Safe D	November 7, 2006
CQ Politics	Safe D	November 7, 2006

==== Results ====
2006 Washington's 9th congressional district election
Party	Candidate	Votes	%
Democratic	Adam Smith (inc.)	119,038	65.72
Republican	Steven C. Cofchin	62,082	34.28
Total votes		181,120	100.00
Democratic hold			

==== By county ====
County results
County	Adam Smith Democratic		Steven C. Cofchin Republican		Margin		Total votes
County	#	%	#	%	#	%	Total votes
King (part)	54,838	68.93%	24,714	31.07%	30,124	37.87%	79,552
Pierce (part)	42,860	62.11%	26,147	37.89%	16,713	24.22%	69,007
Thurston (part)	21,340	65.54%	11,221	34.46%	10,119	31.08%	32,561
Totals	119,038	65.72%	62,082	34.28%	56,956	31.45%	181,120
