= A Responsible Plan to End the War in Iraq =

Proposed plan regarding the Iraq War

The cover of the Responsible Plan document

A Responsible Plan to End the War in Iraq is a 36-page plan that was created by a group of United States Democratic congressional candidates, retired military officers and national security professionals that outlined policy measures (consisting of bills that were before the United States Congress at the time of its writing) that the candidates pledged to support in the 2008 elections.

The plan's stated proposals with respect to Iraq were: drawing down U.S. military involvement in Iraq, development of a permanent nation-building capability in the Department of State, a large infusion of foreign aid into Iraq, a transfer of responsibility to the international community through dialogue, addressing refugee issues, creation of an independent war crimes commission, and funding of education to improve the status of women.

With respect to American domestic politics, the proposals were to ban Presidential signing statements, require treatment in accordance with the Geneva Conventions and habeas corpus rights for all prisoners, allow potential surveillance targets to sue the government pre-emptively for injunctive relief, prohibit rendition, increase benefits for veterans, reduce defense contracting, and address energy issues.

== Background ==
On March 20, 2003, the United States invaded Iraq leading a multinational coalition that included British troops as well as smaller contingents from Australia, Denmark, Poland, and other nations.

Since the beginning of the war there had been great debate about how it should end. The plan cited a number of facts and events as the foundation for its existence, including the following:

- In November 2006, voters elected a new Democratic Party majority in both the Senate and the House of Representatives in the 110th Congress, largely with the expectation that they would work to reduce or end American military involvement in Iraq.
- In December 2006 the Iraq Study Group (ISG), a ten-person bipartisan panel appointed on March 15, 2006, by Congress, released their final report. Also known as the Baker-Hamilton Commission, the ISG was charged with assessing the situation in Iraq and the US-led Iraq War and making policy recommendations. While President George W. Bush praised the ISG's efforts, he rejected many of its recommendations.
- In March 2007, General David Petraeus, Commanding General of the Multi-National Force in Iraq, claimed that there was "no military solution" in Iraq, and that political negotiations were crucial to forging any lasting peace.
- By March 2008, the number of U.S. military personnel killed in Iraq had reached 4,000, with many thousands more wounded, and an estimated hundreds of thousands of Iraqi casualties.
- Also by March 2008, the financial cost of the Iraq War to the United States had surpassed the half trillion dollar mark.

== Germination ==
On August 27, 2007, President Bush made a fundraising visit to Bellevue, Washington in support of Washington's 8th congressional district Republican Representative Dave Reichert. In response, Reichert's main opponent, Democratic candidate Darcy Burner, organized a "virtual town hall" meeting to discuss the situation in Iraq. The town hall meeting was streamed live online and included testimonials from Ambassador Joe Wilson and retired Major General Paul Eaton, former Security Transition Commanding General in Iraq, and the participation of Jon Soltz, chairman of VoteVets.org, and retired Navy Captain Larry Seaquist, among others. In a statement following the event, Darcy Burner wrote:

On Monday morning before the town hall, I asked retired Major General Paul Eaton, who was in charge of rebuilding the Iraqi Army and security forces in Iraq from 2003-2004, if he would chair a group to create a responsible exit plan for Iraq, and he agreed.

Let me repeat: we will be creating a plan to end the war and bring our troops home. It's long past time.

== Unveiling ==
On March 17, 2008, at the Take Back America conference in Washington, D.C., Darcy Burner (WA-08) was joined by five other congressional candidates Donna Edwards (MD-04), Chellie Pingree (ME-01), Tom Perriello (VA-05), Sam Bennett (PA-15) and Jared Polis (CO-02) for the unveiling of A Responsible Plan to End the War in Iraq, a 36-page document that was the culmination of the six-month effort.

== Endorsers ==
In addition to the six candidates at the March 2008 unveiling and Eaton, the plan was also initially endorsed by candidates Eric Massa (NY-29), George Fearing (WA-04), Larry Byrnes (FL-14), and Steve Harrison (NY-13), as well as Dr. Lawrence Korb, former Assistant Secretary of Defense in the Reagan Administration, Capt. Larry Seaquist, former commander of the USS Iowa and former Acting Deputy Assistant Secretary of Defense for Policy Planning, and Brigadier General John Johns, specialist in counterinsurgency and nation-building. Two days after the initial unveiling, Rand Beers, a counterterrorism expert who served on the National Security Council under Presidents Ronald Reagan, George H. W. Bush and Bill Clinton added his endorsement. Within one week, the plan had received the endorsement of an additional 24 Democratic challengers, and as of July 2008 it had 58 House and Senate candidate endorsements, and over 50,000 individual endorsers.

== Contents ==
=== Outline ===
The two main strategic questions the plan sought to answer were:

- How to bring American military engagement in Iraq to a responsible end?
- How to prevent a repeat of mistakes that have been made?

The plan attempted to present a combined military, diplomatic, and economic strategy to end the war in Iraq. It cited various ISG recommendations and listed a number of existing, but stalled bills in Congress that addressed multiple areas of focus.

=== Objectives ===
The plan broke down the areas of focus into several categories:

- Ending U.S. military action in Iraq.
  (per ISG recommendations 22, 40, 41 and 42)
- Increasing the use of U.S. diplomatic power and refocusing anti-terrorism measures.
  (per ISG recommendations 1 and 2)
- Addressing Iraqi economic reconstruction and regional humanitarian concerns.
- Restoring governmental transparency and accountability, and constitutional rights.
- Restoring the U.S. military and supporting veterans.
- Restoring independence to the media.
- Creating a new, U.S.-centered energy policy.
  (per ISG recommendation 23).

=== Iraq Study Group recommendations ===
In support of the stated objectives, the plan referenced seven recommendations from the final report of the Iraq Study Group.

RECOMMENDATION 1: The United States, working with the Iraqi government, should launch the comprehensive New Diplomatic Offensive to deal with the problems of Iraq and of the region.

RECOMMENDATION 2: The goals of the diplomatic offensive as it relates to regional players should be to:

1. Support the unity and territorial integrity of Iraq.
2. Stop destabilizing interventions and actions by Iraq's neighbors.
3. Secure Iraq's borders, including the use of joint patrols with neighboring countries.
4. Prevent the expansion of the instability and conflict beyond Iraq's borders.
5. Promote economic assistance, commerce, trade, political support, and, if possible, military assistance for the Iraqi government from non-neighboring Muslim nations.
6. Energize countries to support national political reconciliation in Iraq.
7. Validate Iraq's legitimacy by resuming diplomatic relations, where appropriate, and reestablishing embassies in Baghdad.
8. Assist Iraq in establishing active working embassies in key capitals in the region (for example, in Riyadh, Saudi Arabia).
9. Help Iraq reach a mutually acceptable agreement on Kirkuk.
10. Assist the Iraqi government in achieving certain security, political, and economic milestones, including better performance on issues such as national reconciliation, equitable distribution of oil revenues, and the dismantling of militias.

RECOMMENDATION 22: The President should state that the United States does not seek permanent military bases in Iraq. If the Iraqi government were to request a temporary base or bases, then the U.S. government could consider that request as it would in the case of any other government.

RECOMMENDATION 23: The President should restate that the United States does not seek to control Iraq's oil.

RECOMMENDATION 40: The United States should not make an open-ended commitment to keep large numbers of American troops deployed in Iraq.

RECOMMENDATION 41: The United States must make it clear to the Iraqi government that the United States could carry out its plans, including planned redeployments, even if Iraq does not implement its planned changes. America’s other security needs and the future of our military cannot be made hostage to the actions or inactions of the Iraqi government.

RECOMMENDATION 42: We should seek to complete the training and equipping mission by the first quarter of 2008, as stated by General George Casey on October 24, 2006.

=== Legislation ===
The plan categorized fifteen bills that had been introduced in both the House or Senate during the 110th Congress that addressed the various objectives of the plan. By February 2009, most of them had been referred to subcommittees, only three had been voted on in the House, and none had yet been enacted into law.

| Objective Category | Bill / Bill Title | Current Status | Date Introduced | House Vote | Senate Vote | Date Enacted Into Law |
|---|---|---|---|---|---|---|
| Diplomacy / State Department Reform | H.R. 3797 New Diplomatic Offensive for Iraq Act | Referred to the House Committee on Foreign Affairs on October 10, 2007 | October 10, 2007 | -- | -- | -- |
| Human Rights / Iraqi Refugees | H.R. 2265 Responsibility to Iraqi Refugees Act of 2007 | Referred to the Subcommittee on Immigration, Citizenship, Refugees, Border Security, and International Law on June 25, 2007 | May 10, 2007 | -- | -- | -- |
| Human Rights / Iraqi Refugees | H.R. 3674 Iraqi Refugee and Internally Displaced Persons Humanitarian Assistance, Resettlement, and Security Act of 2007 | Referred to the Subcommittee on Immigration, Citizenship, Refugees, Border Security, and International Law on November 2, 2007 | September 26, 2007 | -- | -- | -- |
| Restoring The Constitution | H.R. 3045 Presidential Signing Statements Act of 2007 | Referred to the Subcommittee on the Constitution, Civil Rights, and Civil Liberties on August 10, 2007 | July 16, 2007 | -- | -- | -- |
| Restoring The Constitution | H.R. 1416 Habeas Corpus Restoration Act of 2007 | Referred to the Subcommittee on the Constitution, Civil Rights, and Civil Liberties on March 19, 2007 | March 8, 2007 | -- | -- | -- |
| Restoring The Constitution | S. 139 Foreign Surveillance Expedited Review Act | Referred to the Committee on the Judiciary on January 4, 2007 | January 4, 2007 | -- | -- | -- |
| Military Integrity | H.R. 4102 Stop Outsourcing Security Act | Referred to the Committee on Foreign Affairs, and in addition to the Committees on Armed Services, and Intelligence (Permanent Select), for a period to be subsequently determined by the Speaker, in each case for consideration of such provisions as fall within the jurisdiction of the committee concerned, on November 7, 2007 | November 7, 2007 | -- | -- | -- |
| Military Integrity | H.R. 400 War Profiteering Prevention Act of 2007 | Placed on Senate Legislative Calendar under General Orders. Calendar No. 423 on October 17, 2007 | January 11, 2007 | Passed October 9, 2007: 375-3 | -- | -- |
| Military Integrity | H.R. 1352 Torture Outsourcing Prevention Act | Referred to the House Committee on Foreign Affairs on March 6, 2007 | March 6, 2007 | -- | -- | -- |
| Military Integrity | H.R. 2740 MEJA Expansion and Enforcement Act of 2007 | Placed on Senate Legislative Calendar under General Orders. Calendar No. 413 on October 5, 2007 | June 15, 2007 | Passed October 4, 2007: 389-30 | -- | -- |
| Veterans | H.R. 2247 Montgomery GI Bill for Life Act of 2007 | Referred to the Subcommittee on Military Personnel on June 28, 2007 | May 9, 2007 | -- | -- | -- |
| Veterans | H.R. 2874 Veterans' Health Care Improvement Act of 2007 | Referred by Senate to the Committee on Veterans' Affairs on August 3, 2007 | June 27, 2007 | Passed July 30, 2007 on voice vote | -- | -- |
| Veterans | H.R. 2702 Post-9/11 Veterans Educational Assistance Act of 2007 | Referred to the Subcommittee on Economic Opportunity, and the Subcommittee on Disability Assistance and Memorial Affairs on June 20, 2007 | June 13, 2007 | -- | -- | -- |
| Media | S. 2332 Media Ownership Act of 2007 | Committee on Commerce, Science, and Transportation. Reported by Senator Inouye with amendments on September 15, 2008 | November 8, 2007 | -- | -- | -- |
| Energy | H.R. 2809 New Apollo Energy Act of 2007 | Referred to the Subcommittee on Conservation, Credit, Energy, and Research on April 25, 2008 | June 21, 2007 | -- | -- | -- |

== Views about the plan ==
The plan received national press and attention following its unveiling. Ilan Goldenberg, Policy Director at the National Security Network, writing in The New Republic, called it "thoughtful", "a good first step" and "welcome progress". Arianna Huffington at Huffington Post referred to it as "A Contract to Restore America". The plan was also mentioned on ABC's This Week with George Stephanopoulos. Katrina vanden Heuvel, publisher of The Nation magazine, called the plan "responsible", saying "there are no military solutions". However, Political commentator Cokie Roberts stated that withdrawal from Iraq, one of the goals of the plan, would be "an irresponsible thing to do", claiming "Americans would prefer to win". There were also indications that, within the Democratic Party, the plan had some influence in the debate, with the plan cited on the House floor in 2008. and "helped focus" actions in the House according to Speaker Nancy Pelosi speaking about the plan and Burner's efforts in a June 2008 interview.

While the plan received support from the liberal blogosphere and grassroots organizations, such as OpenLeft and Daily Kos, it was panned and received criticism from Republicans in Congress and other conservative commentators. Dave Reichert, Congressman for Washington's 8th district said, through his spokesman, that he believed "military leaders on the ground – not candidates for political office – should make decisions about when and how to end the war". Reichert's spokesman also suggested that "it would be irresponsible to withdraw troops and then send U.S. money 'into a black hole.'"
