= 2008 United States House of Representatives elections in Washington =

- November 4, 2008

All 9 Washington seats to the United States House of Representatives
	Majority party	Minority party
Party	Democratic	Republican
Last election	6	3
Seats won	6	3
Seat change	Steady	Steady
Popular vote	1,725,316	1,189,147
Percentage	59.20%	40.80%
Swing	▼5.07%	▲5.66%

Democratic
50–60%
60–70%
70–80%
80–90%
Republican
50–60%
60–70%
70–80%
80–90%

The 2008 congressional elections in Washington was held on November 4, 2008, to determine who will represent the state of Washington in the United States House of Representatives. Representatives are elected for two-year terms; those elected will serve in the 111th Congress from January 4, 2009, until January 3, 2011. The election coincided with the 2008 U.S. presidential election. Nonpartisan blanket primary elections were held on August 19, 2008.

Washington has nine seats in the House, apportioned according to the 2000 United States census. Its 2007-2008 congressional delegation consisted of six Democrats and three Republicans. All of the incumbents were re-elected, with only the 8th district race being considered competitive.

== Overview ==
=== District ===
District	Democratic		Republican		Total		Result
District	Votes	%	Votes	%	Votes	Votes	%
District 1	233,780	67.76%	111,240	32.24%	345,020	100.00%	Democratic hold
District 2	217,416	62.39%	131,051	37.61%	348,467	100.00%	Democratic hold
District 3	216,701	64.01%	121,828	35.99%	338,529	100.00%	Democratic hold
District 4	99,430	36.91%	169,940	63.09%	269,370	100.00%	Republican hold
District 5	112,382	34.72%	211,305	65.28%	323,687	100.00%	Republican hold
District 6	205,991	66.86%	102,081	33.14%	308,072	100.00%	Democratic hold
District 7	291,963	83.65%	57,054	16.35%	349,017	100.00%	Democratic hold
District 8	171,358	47.22%	191,568	52.78%	362,926	100.00%	Republican hold
District 9	176,295	65.45%	93,080	34.55%	269,375	100.00%	Democratic hold
Total	1,725,316	59.20%	1,189,147	40.80%	2,914,463	100.00%	

Popular vote
Democratic	59.20%
Republican	40.80%

House seats
Democratic	66.67%
Republican	33.33%

== District 1 ==
2008 Washington's 1st congressional district election
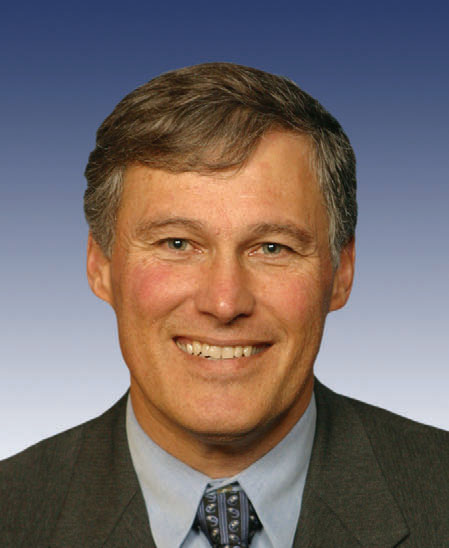

Nominee	Jay Inslee	Larry Ishmael
Party	Democratic	Republican
Popular vote	233,780	111,240
Percentage	67.8%	32.2%
- County results Inslee: 60–70%
U.S. Representative before election
Jay Inslee
Democratic
Elected U.S. Representative
Jay Inslee
Democratic

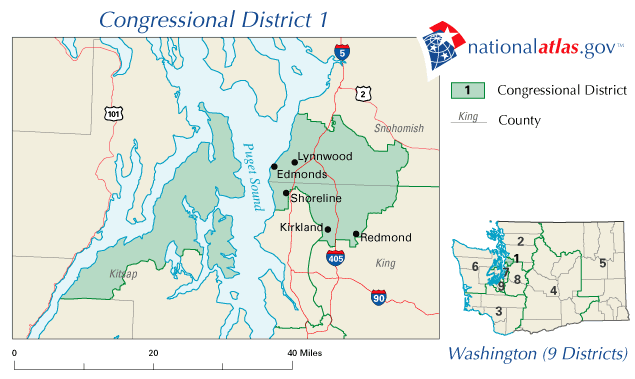

Incumbent Democrat Jay Inslee has represented the 1st district in Congress since 1999. Inslee won in the 2006 election with 68% of the vote. He was opposed by Republican candidate Larry Ishmael.

=== Primary results ===
Washington's 1st congressional district primary election, August 19, 2008
Party	Candidate	Votes	%
Democratic	Jay Inslee	104,342	66.44%
Republican	Larry Ishmael	52,700	33.56%
Total votes		157,042	100.00%

=== General election ===
==== Predictions ====
Source	Ranking	As of
The Cook Political Report	Safe D	November 6, 2008
Rothenberg	Safe D	November 2, 2008
Sabato's Crystal Ball	Safe D	November 6, 2008
Real Clear Politics	Safe D	November 7, 2008
CQ Politics	Safe D	November 6, 2008

==== Results ====
2008 Washington's 1st congressional district election
Party	Candidate	Votes	%
Democratic	Jay Inslee	233,780	67.76%
Republican	Larry Ishmael	111,240	32.24%
Total votes		345,020	100.00%

==== By county ====
County results
County	Jay Inslee Democratic		Larry Ishmael Republican		Margin		Total votes
County	#	%	#	%	#	%	Total votes
King (part)	85,283	69.71%	37,062	30.29%	48,221	39.41%	122,345
Kitsap (part)	41,602	66.15%	21,284	33.85%	20,318	32.31%	62,886
Snohomish (part)	106,895	66.90%	52,894	33.10%	54,001	33.80%	159,789
Totals	233,780	67.76%	111,240	32.24%	122,540	35.52%	345,020

== District 2 ==
2008 Washington's 2nd congressional district election
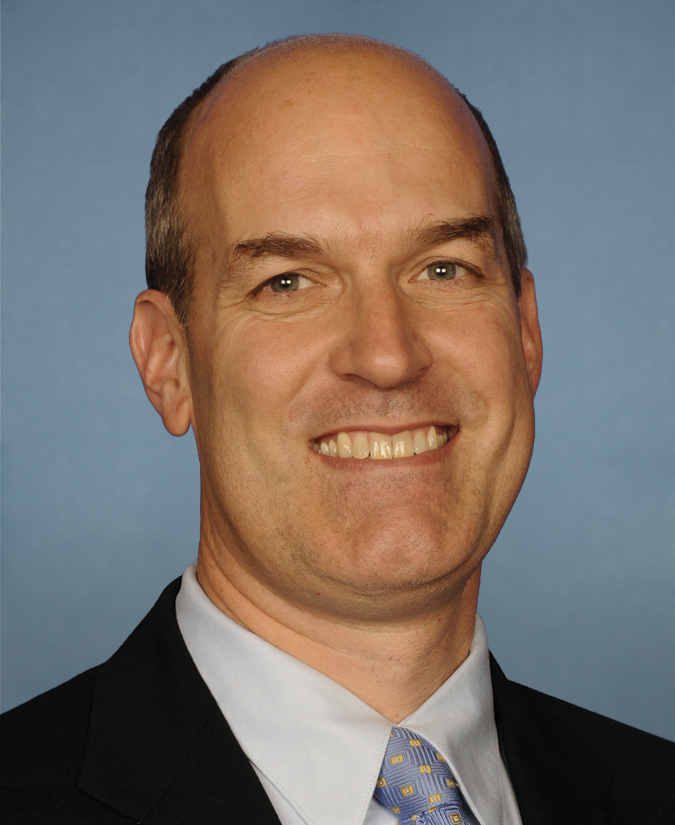

Nominee	Rick Larsen	Rick Bart
Party	Democratic	Republican
Popular vote	217,416	131,051
Percentage	62.4%	37.6%
- County results Larsen: 50–60% 60–70% 70–80%
U.S. Representative before election
Rick Larsen
Democratic
Elected U.S. Representative
Rick Larsen
Democratic

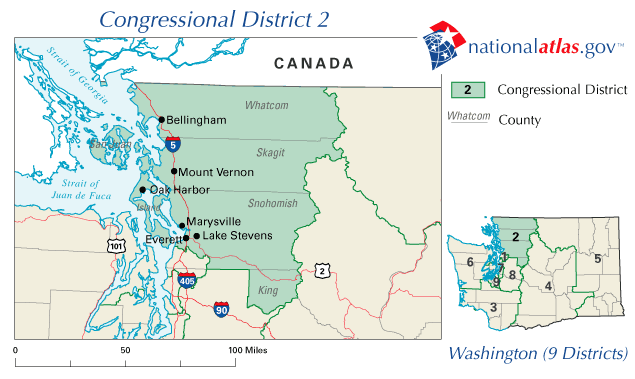

Incumbent Democrat Rick Larsen has represented the 2nd district in Congress since 2001. Larsen won in the 2006 election with 64% of the vote. He was opposed by Republican candidate Rick Bart. Two other Democrats challenged the two in the primary election, Doug Schaffer and Glen Johnson.

=== Primary results ===
Washington's 2nd congressional district primary election, August 19, 2008
Party	Candidate	Votes	%
Democratic	Rick Larsen	98,304	54.33%
Republican	Rick Bart	68,189	37.69%
Democratic	Doug Schaffer	8,857	4.89%
Democratic	Glen Johnson	5,590	3.09%
Total votes		180,940	100.00%

=== General election ===
==== Predictions ====
Source	Ranking	As of
The Cook Political Report	Safe D	November 6, 2008
Rothenberg	Safe D	November 2, 2008
Sabato's Crystal Ball	Safe D	November 6, 2008
Real Clear Politics	Safe D	November 7, 2008
CQ Politics	Safe D	November 6, 2008

==== Results ====
2008 Washington's 2nd congressional district election
Party	Candidate	Votes	%
Democratic	Rick Larsen	217,416	62.39%
Republican	Rick Bart	131,051	37.61%
Total votes		348,467	100.00%

==== By county ====
County	Rick Larsen Democratic		Rick Bart Republican		Margin		Total votes cast
County	#	%	#	%	#	%	Total votes cast
Island	24,948	61.70%	15,489	38.30%	9,459	23.39%	40,437
King (part)	198	66.89%	98	33.11%	100	33.78%	296
San Juan	7,308	72.44%	2,781	27.56%	4,527	44.87%	10,089
Skagit	34,641	64.52%	19,051	35.48%	15,590	29.04%	53,692
Snohomish (part)	87,457	59.00%	60,784	41.00%	26,673	17.99%	148,241
Whatcom	62,864	65.68%	32,848	34.32%	30,016	31.36%	95,712
Totals	217,416	62.39%	131,051	37.61%	86,365	24.78%	348,467

== District 3 ==
2008 Washington's 3rd congressional district election
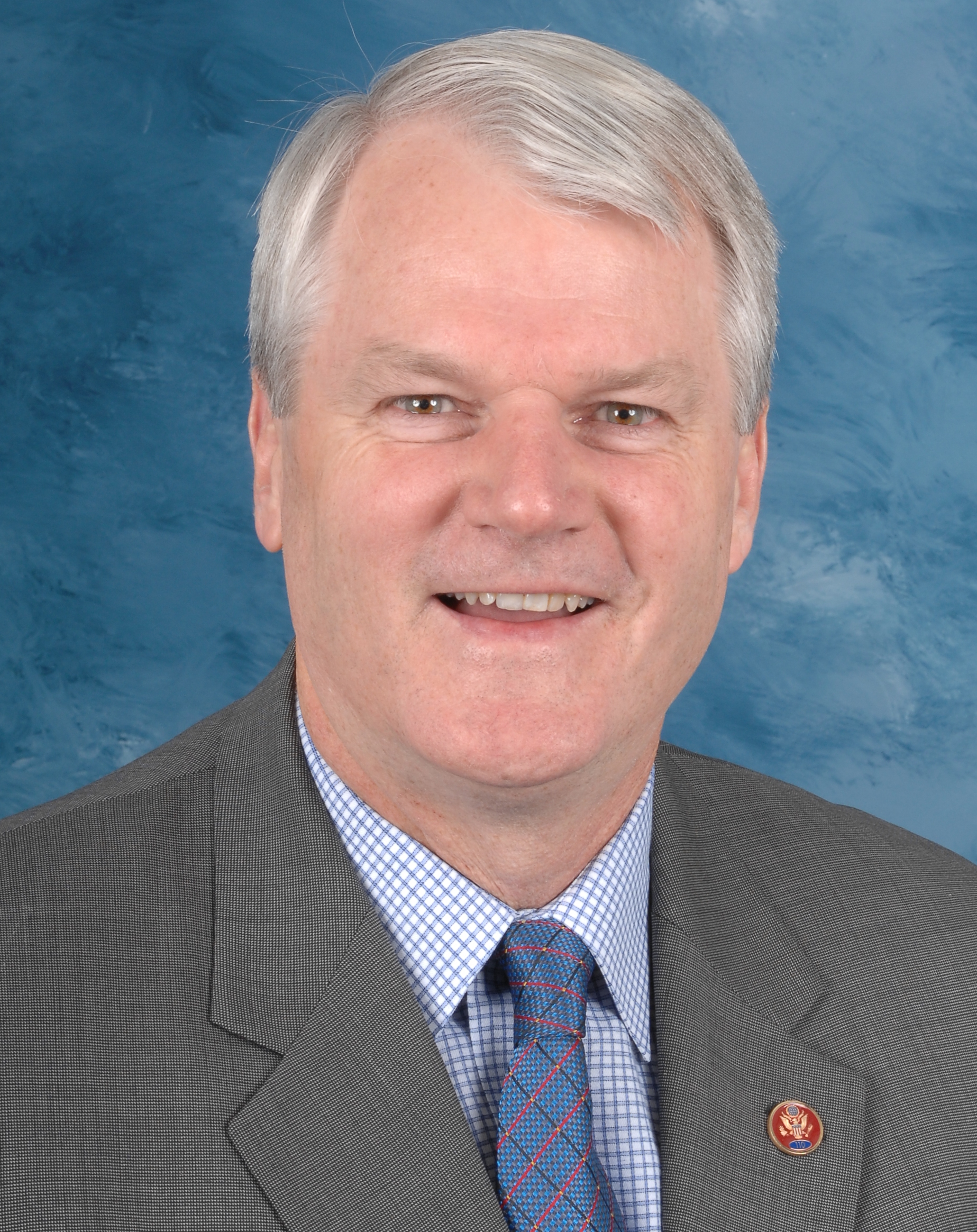

Nominee	Brian Baird	Michael Delavar
Party	Democratic	Republican
Popular vote	216,701	121,828
Percentage	64.0%	36.0%
- County results Baird: 50–60% 60–70% 70–80%
U.S. Representative before election
Brian Baird
Democratic
Elected U.S. Representative
Brian Baird
Democratic

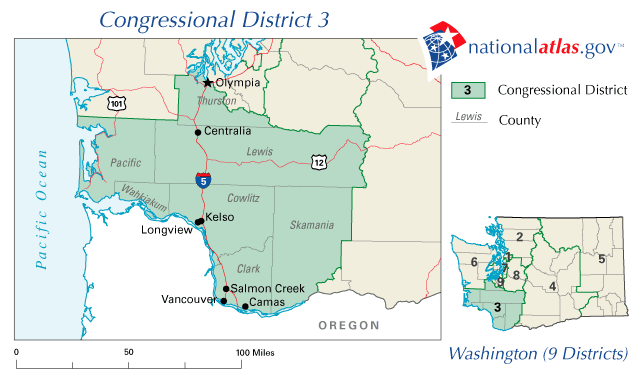

Incumbent Democrat Brian Baird has represented the 3rd district in Congress since 1999. Baird won in the 2006 election with 63% of the vote. He was opposed by Republican candidate Michael Delavar. Democrat Cheryl Crist and Republican Christine Webb also entered the primary.

=== Primary results ===
Results by county Baird: 40–50% 50–60% 60–70%

Washington's 3rd congressional district primary election, August 19, 2008
Party	Candidate	Votes	%
Democratic	Brian Baird	83,409	50.59%
Republican	Michael Delavar	32,372	19.63%
Republican	Christine Webb	27,738	16.82%
Democratic	Cheryl Crist	21,356	12.95%
Total votes		164,875	100.00%

=== General election ===
==== Predictions ====
Source	Ranking	As of
The Cook Political Report	Safe D	November 6, 2008
Rothenberg	Safe D	November 2, 2008
Sabato's Crystal Ball	Safe D	November 6, 2008
Real Clear Politics	Safe D	November 7, 2008
CQ Politics	Safe D	November 6, 2008

==== Results ====
2008 Washington's 3rd congressional district election
Party	Candidate	Votes	%
Democratic	Brian Baird	216,701	64.01%
Republican	Michael Delavar	121,828	35.99%
Total votes		338,529	100.00%

==== By county ====
County results
County	Brian Baird Democratic		Michael Delavar Republican		Margin		Total votes
County	#	%	#	%	#	%	Total votes
Clark	106,878	61.21%	67,733	38.79%	39,145	22.42%	174,611
Cowlitz	29,102	66.71%	14,523	33.29%	14,579	33.42%	43,625
Lewis	19,745	59.03%	13,705	40.97%	6,040	18.06%	33,450
Pacific	7,706	72.57%	2,913	27.43%	4,793	45.14%	10,619
Skamania (part)	2,309	60.19%	1,527	39.81%	782	20.39%	3,836
Thurston (part)	49,456	70.50%	20,699	29.50%	28,757	40.99%	70,155
Wahkiakum	1,505	67.40%	728	32.60%	777	34.80%	2,233
Totals	216,701	64.01%	121,828	35.99%	94,873	28.03%	338,529

== District 4 ==
2008 Washington's 4th congressional district election
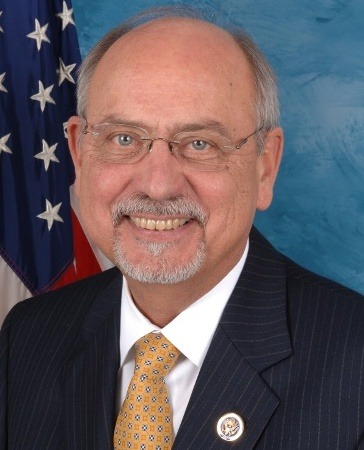

Nominee	Doc Hastings	George Fearing
Party	Republican	Democratic
Popular vote	169,940	99,430
Percentage	63.1%	36.9%
- County results Hastings: 50–60% 60–70%
U.S. Representative before election
Doc Hastings
Republican
Elected U.S. Representative
Doc Hastings
Republican

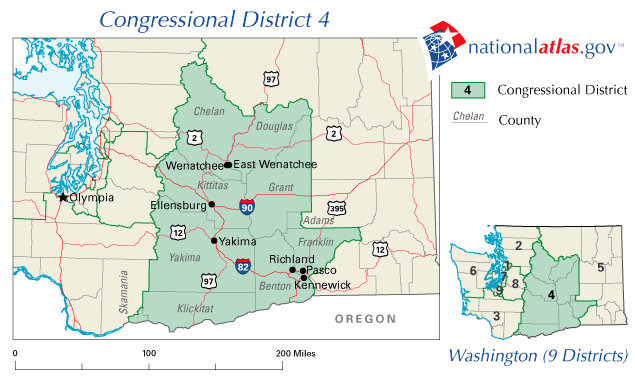

Incumbent Republican Doc Hastings has represented the 4th district in Congress since 1995. Hastings won in the 2006 election with 60% of the vote. He was opposed by Democratic candidate George Fearing. Republican Gordon Allen Pross was eliminated in the primary.

=== Primary results ===
Washington's 4th congressional district primary election, August 19, 2008
Party	Candidate	Votes	%
Republican	Doc Hastings	93,241	62.19%
Democratic	George Fearing	49,841	33.24%
Republican	Gordon Allen Pross	6,842	4.56%
Total votes		149,924	100.00%

=== General election ===
==== Predictions ====
Source	Ranking	As of
The Cook Political Report	Safe R	November 6, 2008
Rothenberg	Safe R	November 2, 2008
Sabato's Crystal Ball	Safe R	November 6, 2008
Real Clear Politics	Safe R	November 7, 2008
CQ Politics	Safe R	November 6, 2008

==== Results ====
2008 Washington's 4th congressional district election
Party	Candidate	Votes	%
Republican	Doc Hastings	169,940	63.09%
Democratic	George Fearing	99,430	36.91%
Total votes		269,370	100.00%

==== By county ====
County results
County	Doc Hastings Republican		George Fearing Democratic		Margin		Total votes
County	#	%	#	%	#	%	Total votes
Adams (part)	1,522	67.08%	747	32.92%	775	34.16%	2,269
Benton	46,603	65.23%	24,838	34.77%	21,765	30.47%	71,441
Chelan	20,270	65.49%	10,681	34.51%	9,589	30.98%	30,951
Douglas	10,108	68.52%	4,644	31.48%	5,464	37.04%	14,752
Franklin	12,408	64.06%	6,960	35.94%	5,448	28.13%	19,368
Grant	18,460	69.17%	8,227	30.83%	10,233	38.34%	26,687
Kittitas	10,095	58.57%	7,142	41.43%	2,953	17.13%	17,237
Klickitat	5,603	57.25%	4,184	42.75%	1,419	14.50%	9,787
Skamania (part)	717	52.11%	659	47.89%	58	4.22%	1,376
Yakima	44,154	58.48%	31,348	41.52%	12,806	16.96%	75,502
Totals	169,940	63.09%	99,430	36.91%	70,510	26.18%	269,370

== District 5 ==
2008 Washington's 5th congressional district election
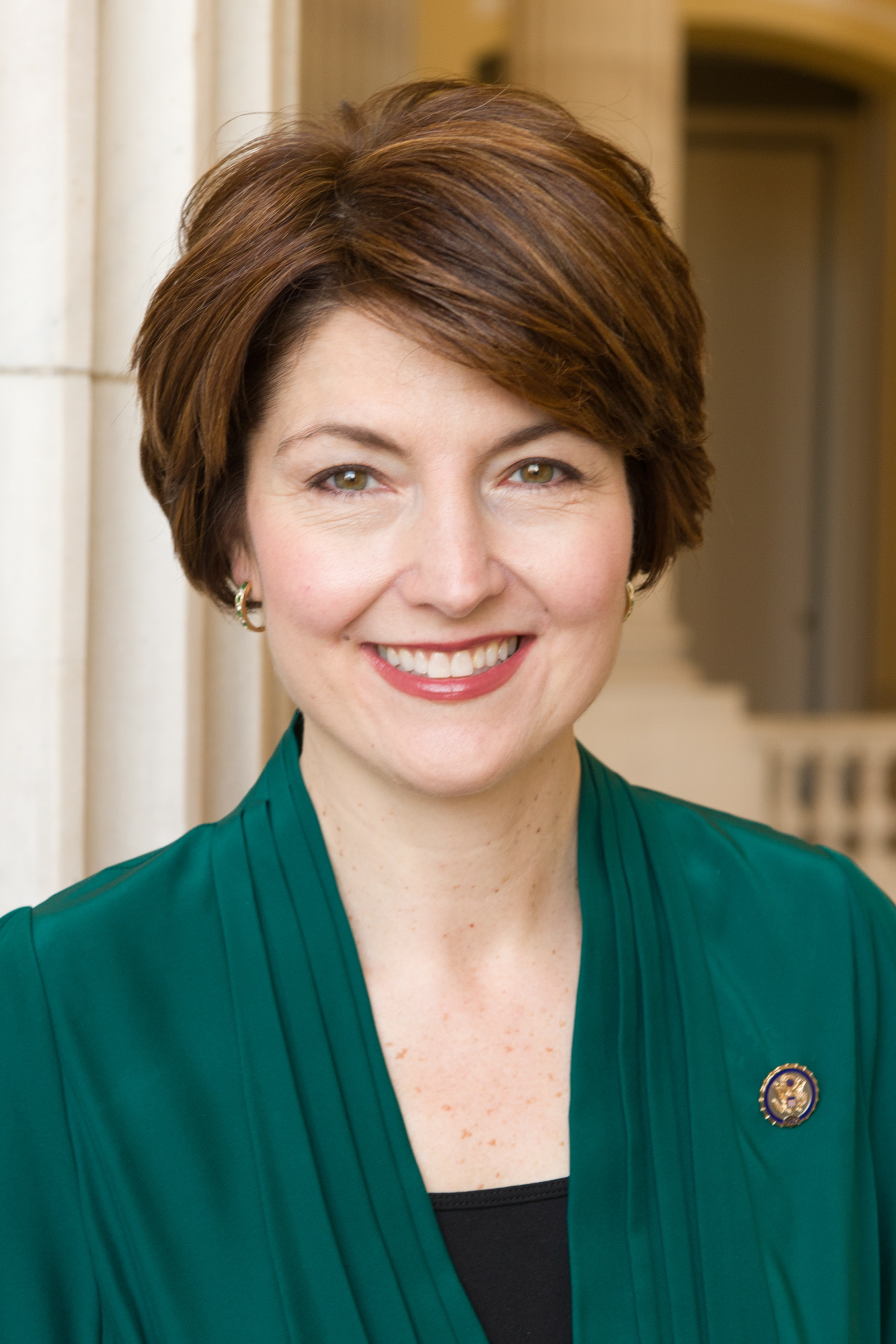

Nominee	Cathy McMorris Rodgers	Mark Mays
Party	Republican	Democratic
Popular vote	211,305	112,382
Percentage	65.3%	34.7%
- County results Rodgers: 60–70% 70–80% 80–90%
U.S. Representative before election
Cathy McMorris Rodgers
Republican
Elected U.S. Representative
Cathy McMorris Rodgers
Republican

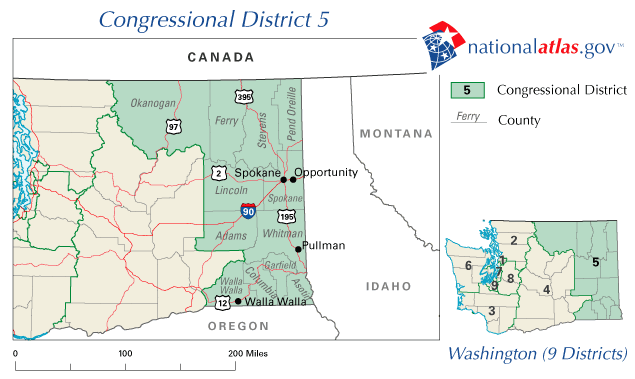

Incumbent Republican Cathy McMorris Rodgers has represented the 2nd district in Congress since 2005. Rodgers was elected in 2006 with 56% of the vote. She was opposed by Democratic candidate Mark Mays. Barbara Lampert of the Democratic party, Republican Kurt Erickson, Libertarian John Beck and Constitution candidate Randall Yearout were eliminated in the primary.

=== Primary results ===
Washington's 5th congressional district primary election, August 19, 2008
Party	Candidate	Votes	%
Republican	Cathy McMorris Rodgers	96,584	56.29%
Democratic	Mark Mays	34,251	19.96%
Democratic	Barbara Lampert	19,645	11.45%
Republican	Kurt Erickson	12,155	7.08%
Constitution	Randall Yearout	5,268	3.07%
Libertarian	John H. Beck	3,673	2.14%
Total votes		171,576	100.00%

=== General election ===
==== Predictions ====
Source	Ranking	As of
The Cook Political Report	Safe R	November 6, 2008
Rothenberg	Safe R	November 2, 2008
Sabato's Crystal Ball	Safe R	November 6, 2008
Real Clear Politics	Safe R	November 7, 2008
CQ Politics	Safe R	November 6, 2008

==== Results ====
2008 Washington's 5th congressional district election
Party	Candidate	Votes	%
Republican	Cathy McMorris Rodgers	211,305	65.28%
Democratic	Mark Mays	112,382	34.72%
Total votes		323,687	100.00%

==== By county ====
County results
County	Cathy McMorris Rodgers Republican		Mark Mays Democratic		Margin		Total votes
County	#	%	#	%	#	%	Total votes
Adams (part)	1,964	82.45%	418	17.55%	1,546	64.90%	2,382
Asotin	6,422	67.96%	3,028	32.04%	3,394	35.92%	9,450
Columbia	1,795	81.78%	400	18.22%	1,395	63.55%	2,195
Ferry	2,448	71.60%	971	28.40%	1,477	43.20%	3,419
Garfield	1,081	80.91%	255	19.09%	826	61.83%	1,336
Lincoln	4,586	78.10%	1,286	21.90%	3,300	56.20%	5,872
Okanogan	11,082	67.37%	5,367	32.63%	5,715	34.74%	16,449
Pend Oreille	4,426	69.62%	1,931	30.38%	2,495	39.25%	6,357
Spokane	134,228	62.79%	79,531	37.21%	54,697	25.59%	213,759
Stevens	16,068	73.14%	5,902	26.86%	10,166	46.27%	21,970
Walla Walla	16,713	70.62%	6,954	29.38%	9,759	41.23%	23,667
Whitman	10,492	62.34%	6,339	37.66%	4,153	24.67%	16,831
Totals	211,305	65.28%	112,382	34.72%	98,923	30.56%	323,687

== District 6 ==
2008 Washington's 6th congressional district election
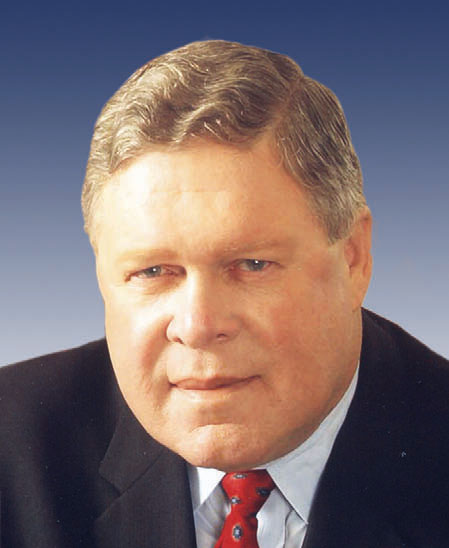
Nominee	Norm Dicks	Doug Cloud
Party	Democratic	Republican
Popular vote	205,991	102,081
Percentage	66.9%	33.1%
- County results Dicks: 50–60% 60–70% 70–80%
U.S. Representative before election
Norm Dicks
Democratic
Elected U.S. Representative
Norm Dicks
Democratic

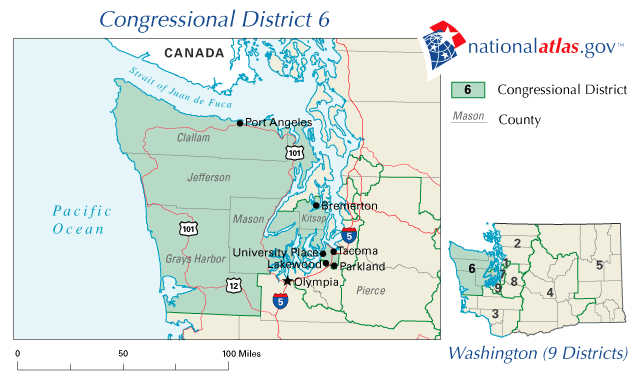

Incumbent Democrat Norm Dicks has represented the 6th district in Congress since 1977. Dicks won in the 2006 election with 71% of the vote. He was opposed by Republican candidate Doug Cloud. Green candidate Gary Murrell and Democrat Paul Richmond also entered the primary.

=== Primary results ===
Washington's 6th congressional district primary election, August 19, 2008
Party	Candidate	Votes	%
Democratic	Norm Dicks	96,862	57.26%
Republican	Doug Cloud	51,300	30.33%
Democratic	Paul Richmond	14,983	8.86%
Green	Glen Johnson	6,014	3.56%
Total votes		169,159	100.00%

=== General election ===
==== Predictions ====
Source	Ranking	As of
The Cook Political Report	Safe D	November 6, 2008
Rothenberg	Safe D	November 2, 2008
Sabato's Crystal Ball	Safe D	November 6, 2008
Real Clear Politics	Safe D	November 7, 2008
CQ Politics	Safe D	November 6, 2008

==== Results ====
2008 Washington's 6th congressional district election
Party	Candidate	Votes	%
Democratic	Norm Dicks	205,991	66.86%
Republican	Doug Cloud	102,081	33.14%
Total votes		308,072	100.00%

==== By county ====
County results
County	Norm Dicks Democratic		Doug Cloud Republican		Margin		Total votes
County	#	%	#	%	#	%	Total votes
Clallam	20,745	55.72%	16,489	44.28%	4,256	11.43%	37,234
Grays Harbor	18,783	66.64%	9,403	33.36%	9,380	33.28%	28,186
Jefferson	13,462	70.23%	5,706	29.77%	7,756	40.46%	19,168
Kitsap (part)	39,404	67.77%	18,736	32.23%	20,668	35.55%	58,140
Mason	17,710	64.11%	9,915	35.89%	7,795	28.22%	27,625
Pierce (part)	95,887	69.63%	41,832	30.37%	54,055	39.25%	137,719
Totals	205,991	66.86%	102,081	33.14%	103,910	33.73%	308,072

== District 7 ==
2008 Washington's 7th congressional district election
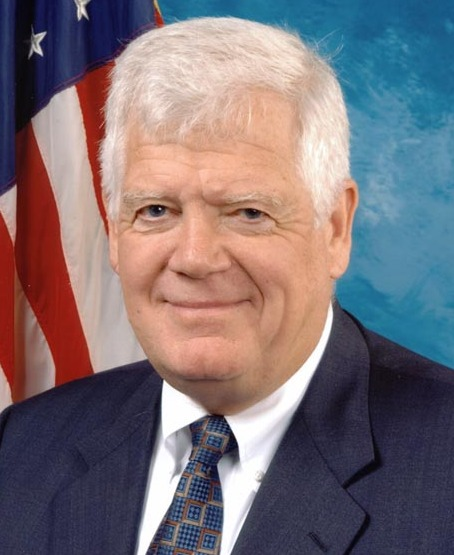

Nominee	Jim McDermott	Steve Beren
Party	Democratic	Republican
Popular vote	291,963	57,054
Percentage	83.7%	16.4%
- County results Mcdermott: 80–90%
U.S. Representative before election
Jim McDermott
Democratic
Elected U.S. Representative
Jim McDermott
Democratic

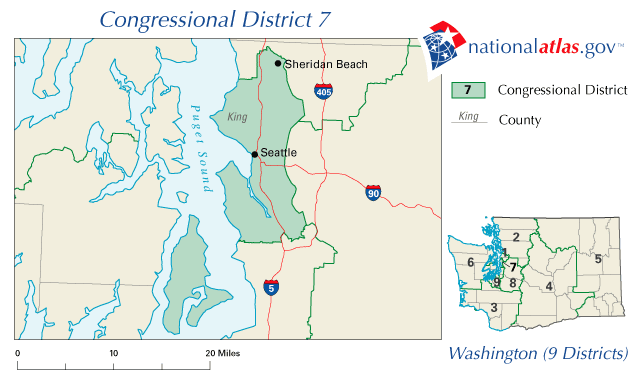

Incumbent Democrat Jim McDermott has represented the 7th district in Congress since 1989. McDermott won in the 2006 election with 79% of the vote in the most Democratic district in the state. He was opposed by Republican candidate Steve Beren. Democrats Donovan Rivers and Goodspaceguy entered the primary, as well as independents Mark Goldman and Al Schaefer.

=== Primary results ===
Washington's 7th congressional district primary election, August 19, 2008
Party	Candidate	Votes	%
Democratic	Jim McDermott	95,344	73.82%
Republican	Steve Beren	19,307	14.95%
Democratic	Donovan Rivers	6,685	5.18%
Independent	Mark A. Goldman	3,410	2.64%
Democratic	Goodspaceguy Nelson	3,199	2.48%
Independent	Al Schaefer	1,216	0.94%
Total votes		129,161	100.00%

=== General election ===
==== Predictions ====
Source	Ranking	As of
The Cook Political Report	Safe D	November 6, 2008
Rothenberg	Safe D	November 2, 2008
Sabato's Crystal Ball	Safe D	November 6, 2008
Real Clear Politics	Safe D	November 7, 2008
CQ Politics	Safe D	November 6, 2008

==== Results ====
2008 Washington's 7th congressional district election
Party	Candidate	Votes	%
Democratic	Jim McDermott	291,963	83.65%
Republican	Steve Beren	57,054	16.35%
Total votes		349,017	100.00%

==== By county ====
County results
County	Jim McDermott Democratic		Steve Beren Republican		Margin		Total votes
County	#	%	#	%	#	%	Total votes
King (part)	291,963	83.65%	57,054	16.35%	234,909	67.31%	349,017
Totals	291,963	83.65%	57,054	16.35%	234,909	67.31%	349,017

== District 8 ==
2008 Washington's 8th congressional district election
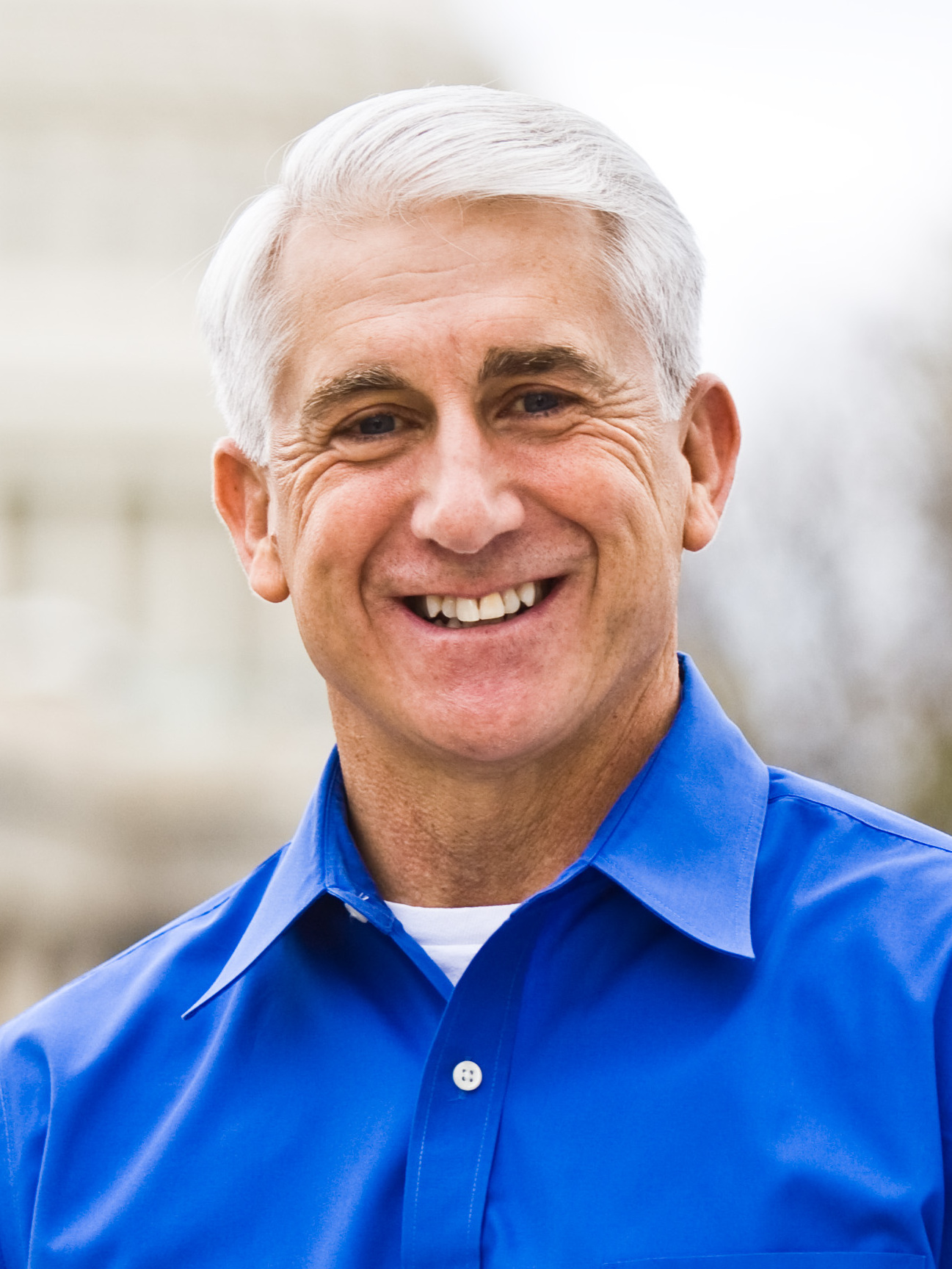

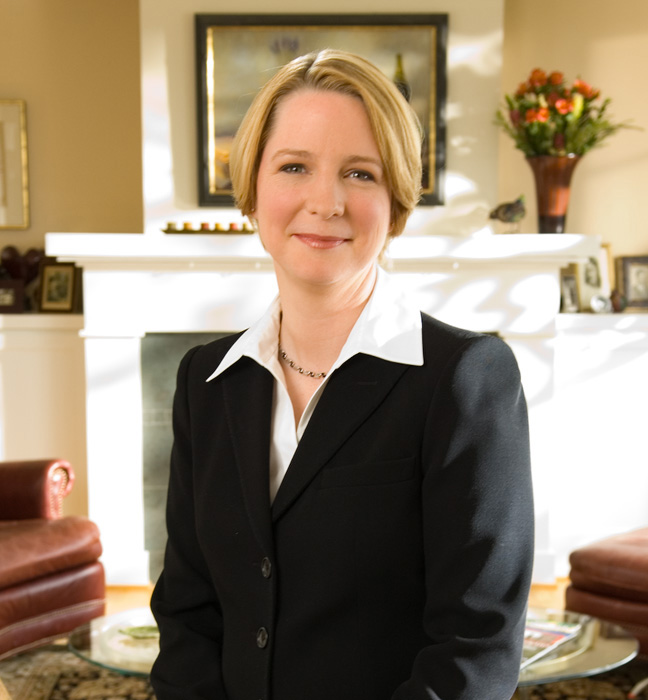
Nominee	Dave Reichert	Darcy Burner
Party	Republican	Democratic
Popular vote	191,568	171,358
Percentage	52.8%	47.2%
- County results Reichert: 50–60%
U.S. Representative before election
Dave Reichert
Republican
Elected U.S. Representative
Dave Reichert
Republican

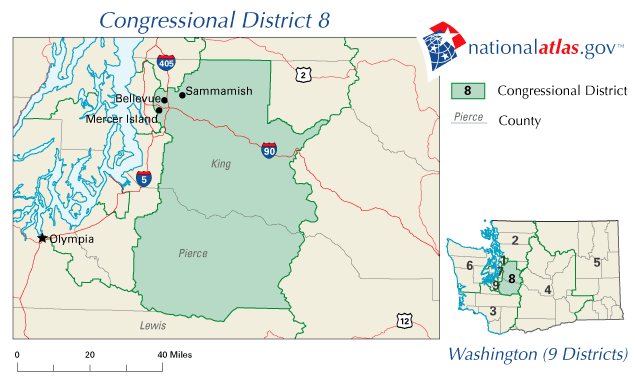

Incumbent Republican Dave Reichert has represented the 8th district in Congress since 2005. Reichert won in the 2006 election with 51.5% of the vote. He was opposed by Democratic candidate Darcy Burner. The primary also included Democrats James Vaughn and Keith Arnold, and Independents Richard Todd and Boleslaw Orlinski.

The District 8 race was considered competitive: it voted for Obama by a large margin and had a Cook PVI of D+2. It was rated "toss up" by Cook, "no clear favorite" by CQ Politics and "toss up/tilt Republican" by Rothenberg.

=== Primary results ===
Washington's 8th congressional district primary election, August 19, 2008
Party	Candidate	Votes	%
Republican	Dave Reichert	74,140	48.54%
Democratic	Darcy Burner	68,010	44.53%
Democratic	James E. Vaughn	5,051	3.31%
Independent	Richard Todd	2,116	1.39%
Democratic	Keith Arnold	1,886	1.23%
Independent	Boleslaw Orlinski	1,523	1.00%
Total votes		152,726	100.00%

=== General election ===
==== Predictions ====
Source	Ranking	As of
The Cook Political Report	Tossup	November 6, 2008
Rothenberg	Tossup	November 2, 2008
Sabato's Crystal Ball	Lean D (flip)	November 6, 2008
Real Clear Politics	Tossup	November 7, 2008
CQ Politics	Tossup	November 6, 2008

==== Results ====
2008 Washington's 8th congressional district election
Party	Candidate	Votes	%
Republican	Dave Reichert	191,568	52.78%
Democratic	Darcy Burner	171,358	47.22%
Total votes		362,926	100.00%

==== By county ====
County results
County	Dave Reichert Republican		Darcy Burner Democratic		Margin		Total votes
County	#	%	#	%	#	%	Total votes
King (part)	147,170	51.22%	140,165	48.78%	7,005	2.44%	287,335
Pierce (part)	44,398	58.73%	31,193	41.27%	13,205	17.47%	75,591
Totals	191,568	52.78%	171,358	47.22%	20,210	5.57%	362,926

== District 9 ==
2008 Washington's 9th congressional district election
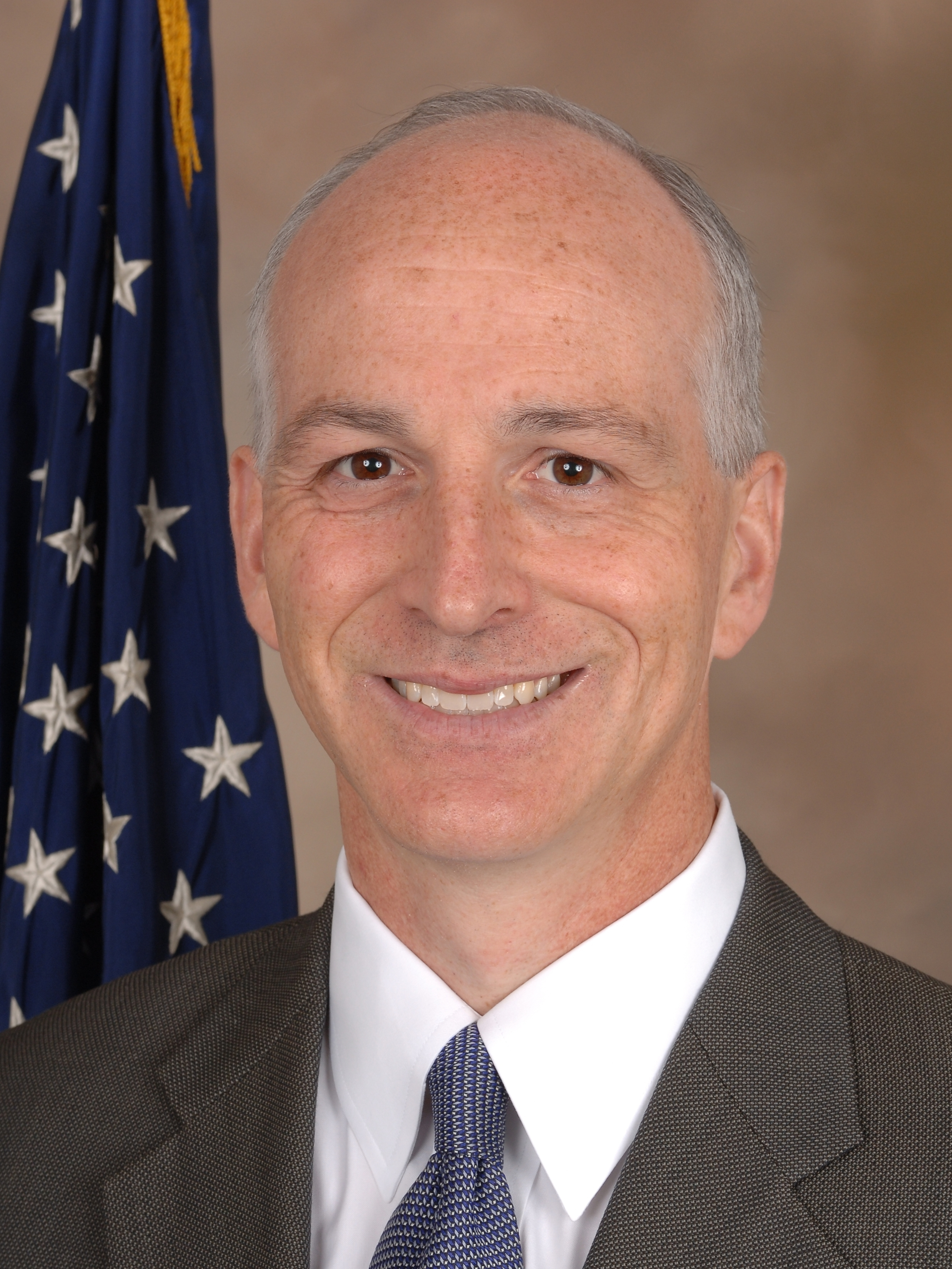

Nominee	Adam Smith	James Postma
Party	Democratic	Republican
Popular vote	176,295	93,080
Percentage	65.5%	34.5%
- County results Smith: 60–70%
U.S. Representative before election
Adam Smith
Democratic
Elected U.S. Representative
Adam Smith
Democratic

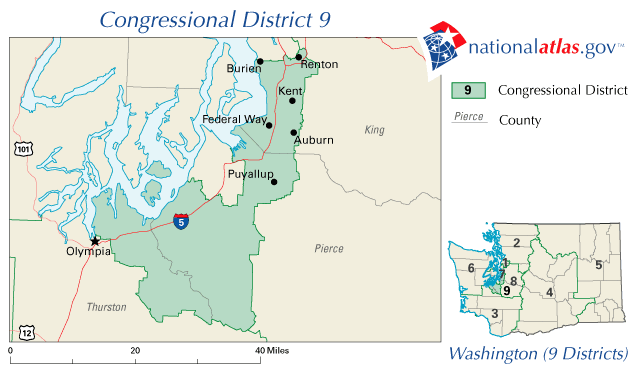

Incumbent Democrat Adam Smith has represented the 9th district in Congress since 1997. Smith won in the 2006 election with 66% of the vote. He was opposed by Republican candidate James Postma.

=== Primary results ===
Washington's 9th congressional district primary election, August 19, 2008
Party	Candidate	Votes	%
Democratic	Adam Smith	81,503	64.70%
Republican	James Postma	44,472	35.30%
Total votes		125,975	100.00%

=== General election ===
==== Predictions ====
Source	Ranking	As of
The Cook Political Report	Safe D	November 6, 2008
Rothenberg	Safe D	November 2, 2008
Sabato's Crystal Ball	Safe D	November 6, 2008
Real Clear Politics	Safe D	November 7, 2008
CQ Politics	Safe D	November 6, 2008

==== Results ====
2008 Washington's 9th congressional district election
Party	Candidate	Votes	%
Democratic	Adam Smith	176,295	65.45%
Republican	James Postma	93,080	34.55%
Total votes		269,375	100.00%

==== By county ====
County results
County	Adam Smith Democratic		James Postma Republican		Margin		Total votes
County	#	%	#	%	#	%	Total votes
King (part)	82,368	69.66%	35,877	30.34%	46,491	39.32%	118,245
Pierce (part)	62,448	60.81%	40,254	39.19%	22,194	21.61%	102,702
Thurston (part)	31,479	65.00%	16,949	35.00%	14,530	30.00%	48,428
Totals	176,295	65.45%	93,080	34.55%	83,215	30.89%	269,375
