= 2004 United States House of Representatives elections in Washington =

- November 2, 2004

All 9 Washington seats to the United States House of Representatives
	Majority party	Minority party
Party	Democratic	Republican
Last election	6	3
Seats won	6	3
Seat change	Steady	Steady
Popular vote	1,725,316	1,189,147
Percentage	58.93%	40.13%
Swing	▲6.75%	▼4.66%

Democratic
50–60%
60–70%
70–80%
80–90%
Republican
50–60%
60–70%
70–80%

The United States House of Representatives elections in Washington were held on November 2, 2004. Washington has nine members in the House of Representatives, as apportioned during the 2000 census, and all nine seats were up for re-election. There were two open seats in the 5th and 8th districts when Republicans George Nethercutt and Jennifer Dunn, respectively, retired. No seats changed party this year.

== Overview ==
United States House of Representatives elections in Washington, 2004
Party	Votes	Percentage	Seats	+/–
Democratic	1,608,751	58.93%	6	—
Republican	1,095,493	40.13%	3	—
Independents	25,751	0.94%	0	—
Totals	2,729,995	100.00%	9	—

== District 1 ==
2004 Washington's 1st congressional district election
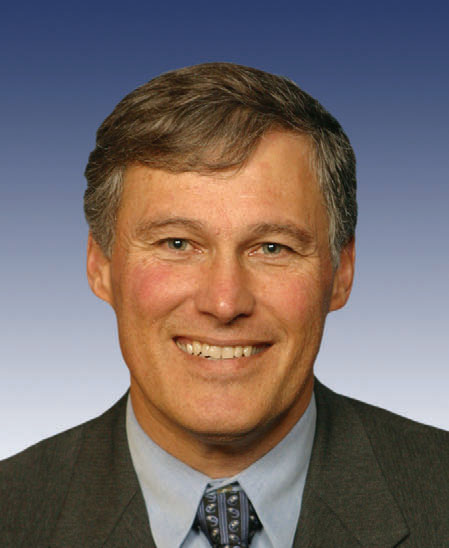

Nominee	Jay Inslee	Randy Eastwood
Party	Democratic	Republican
Popular vote	204,121	117,850
Percentage	62.3%	36.0%
- County results Inslee: 60–70%
U.S. Representative before election
Jay Inslee (inc.)
Democratic
Elected U.S. Representative
Jay Inslee
Democratic

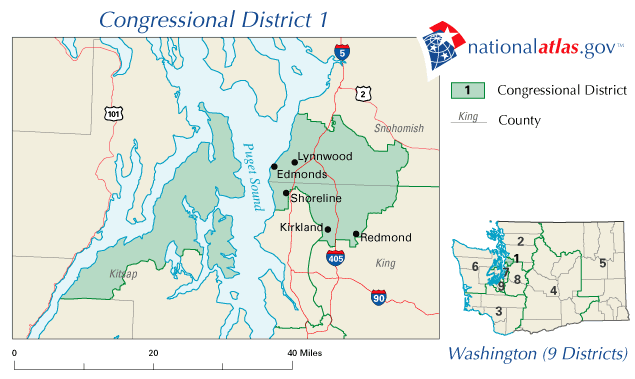

In this liberal-leaning district based in the northern suburbs of Seattle and parts of the Kitsap Peninsula, incumbent Democratic Congressman Jay Inslee did not face a serious challenge from Republican candidate Randy Eastwood and Libertarian Charles Moore. Congressman Inslee was able to crush both candidates in the general election to win his fifth nonconsecutive term in Congress.

=== Predictions ===
Source	Ranking	As of
The Cook Political Report	Safe D	October 29, 2004
Sabato's Crystal Ball	Safe D	November 1, 2004

=== Results ===
2004 Washington's 1st congressional district election
Party	Candidate	Votes	%
Democratic	Jay Inslee (inc.)	204,121	62.28
Republican	Randy Eastwood	117,850	35.96
Libertarian	Charles Moore	5,798	1.77
Total votes		327,769	100.00
Democratic hold			

==== By county ====
County results
County	Jay Inslee Democratic		Randy Eastwood Republican		Charles Moore Libertarian		Margin		Total votes
County	#	%	#	%	#	%	#	%	Total votes
King (part)	76,289	63.94%	41,004	34.37%	2,014	1.69%	35,285	29.57%	119,307
Kitsap (part)	36,766	61.49%	22,004	36.80%	1,017	1.70%	14,762	24.69%	59,787
Snohomish (part)	91,066	61.25%	54,842	36.89%	2,767	1.86%	36,224	24.36%	148,675
Totals	204,121	62.28%	117,850	35.96%	5,798	1.77%	86,271	26.32%	327,769

== District 2 ==
2004 Washington's 2nd congressional district election

Nominee	Rick Larsen	Suzanne Sinclair
Party	Democratic	Republican
Popular vote	202,383	106,333
Percentage	63.9%	33.6%
- County results Larsen: 50–60% 60–70% 70–80%
U.S. Representative before election
Rick Larsen (inc.)
Democratic
Elected U.S. Representative
Rick Larsen
Democratic

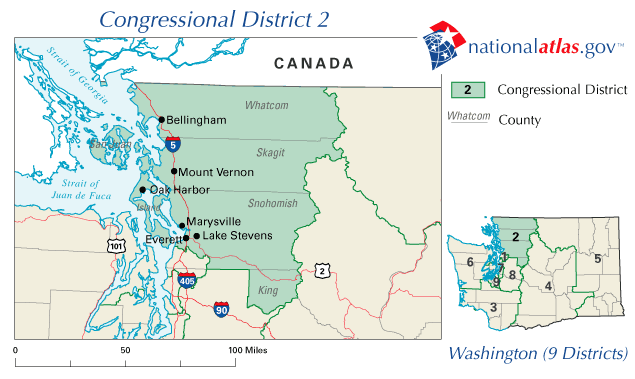

Incumbent Congressman Rick Larsen has represented this Western Washington district, which extends from the northern and western suburbs of Seattle to the Canada–US border in the north since he was first elected in 2000. This year, he was challenged by Republican Suzanne Sinclair and Libertarian Bruce Guthrie, but he was easily able to win a third term due to the liberal nature of his constituency.

=== Predictions ===
Source	Ranking	As of
The Cook Political Report	Safe D	October 29, 2004
Sabato's Crystal Ball	Safe D	November 1, 2004

=== Results ===
2004 Washington's 2nd congressional district election
Party	Candidate	Votes	%
Democratic	Rick Larsen (inc.)	202,383	63.91
Republican	Suzanne Sinclair	106,333	33.58
Libertarian	Bruce Guthrie	7,966	2.52
Total votes		316,682	100.00
Democratic hold			

==== By county ====
County	Rick Larsen Democratic		Suzanne Sinclair Republican		Bruce Guthrie Libertarian		Margin		Total votes cast
County	#	%	#	%	#	%	#	%	Total votes cast
Island	21,649	58.84%	14,432	39.22%	715	1.94%	7,217	19.61%	36,796
King (part)	207	67.21%	86	27.92%	15	4.87%	121	39.29%	308
San Juan	6,762	70.50%	2,471	25.76%	359	3.74%	4,291	44.74%	9,592
Skagit	31,844	62.91%	17,604	34.78%	1,170	2.31%	14,240	28.13%	50,618
Snohomish (part)	86,400	63.61%	46,282	34.07%	3,149	2.32%	40,118	29.54%	135,831
Whatcom	55,521	66.46%	25,458	30.48%	2,558	3.06%	30,063	35.99%	83,537
Totals	202,383	63.91%	106,333	33.58%	7,966	2.52%	96,050	30.33%	316,682

== District 3 ==
2004 Washington's 3rd congressional district election
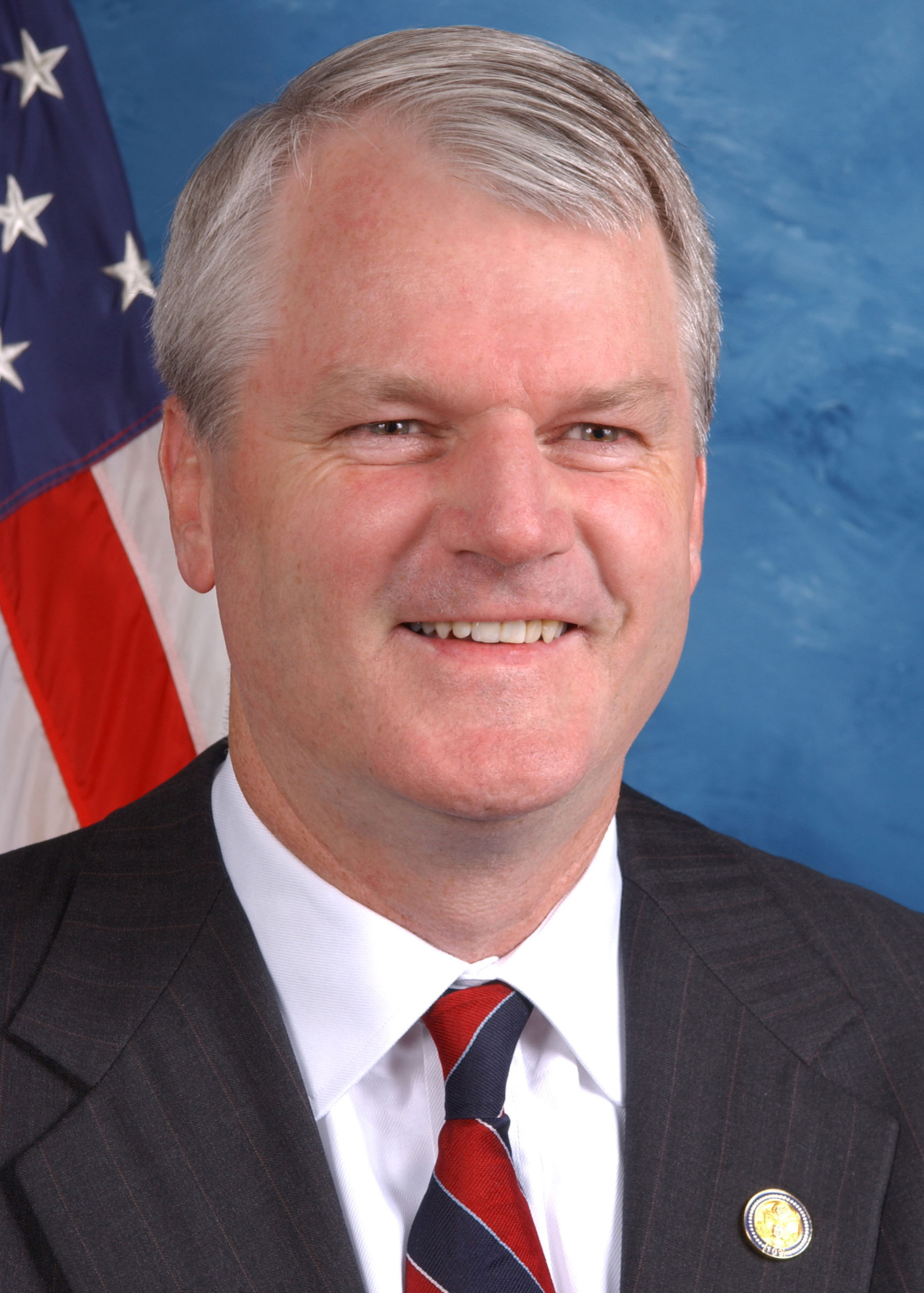

Nominee	Brian Baird	Thomas E. Crowson
Party	Democratic	Republican
Popular vote	193,626	119,027
Percentage	61.93%	38.07%
- County results Baird: 50–60% 60–70% 70–80%
U.S. Representative before election
Brian Baird
Democratic
Elected U.S. Representative
Brian Baird
Democratic

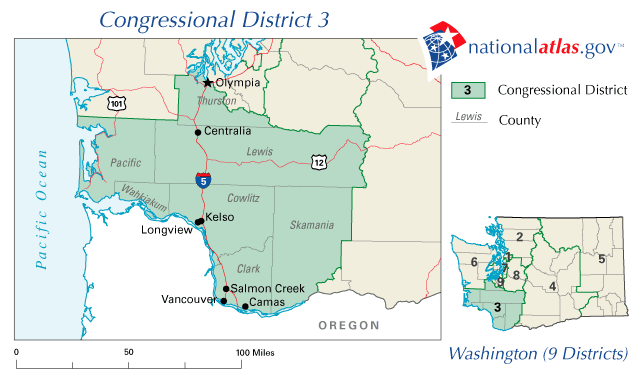

This Western Washington district, which spans from Olympia to the Washington-Oregon border, has a moderate profile and has been represented by Democratic Congressman Brian Baird since 1999. Seeking a fourth term, Baird was opposed by Republican Thomas Crowson, but the Congressman's popularity allowed him to crush his opponent in a landslide.

=== Predictions ===
Source	Ranking	As of
The Cook Political Report	Safe D	October 29, 2004
Sabato's Crystal Ball	Safe D	November 1, 2004

=== Results ===
2004 Washington's 3rd congressional district election
Party	Candidate	Votes	%
Democratic	Brian Baird (inc.)	193,626	61.93
Republican	Thomas A. Crowson	119,027	38.07
Total votes		312,653	100.00
Democratic hold			

==== By county ====
County results
County	Brian Baird Democratic		Thomas A. Crowson Republican		Margin		Total votes
County	#	%	#	%	#	%	Total votes
Clark	95,853	58.90%	66,899	41.10%	28,954	17.79%	162,752
Cowlitz	27,708	67.26%	13,488	32.74%	14,220	34.52%	41,196
Lewis	17,024	54.79%	14,047	45.21%	2,977	9.58%	31,071
Pacific	7,073	71.63%	2,801	28.37%	4,272	43.27%	9,874
Skamania (part)	2,114	59.94%	1,413	40.06%	701	19.88%	3,527
Thurston (part)	42,335	68.20%	19,739	31.80%	22,596	36.40%	62,074
Wahkiakum	1,519	70.36%	640	29.64%	879	40.71%	2,159
Totals	193,626	61.93%	119,027	38.07%	74,599	23.86%	312,653

== District 4 ==
2004 Washington's 4th congressional district election
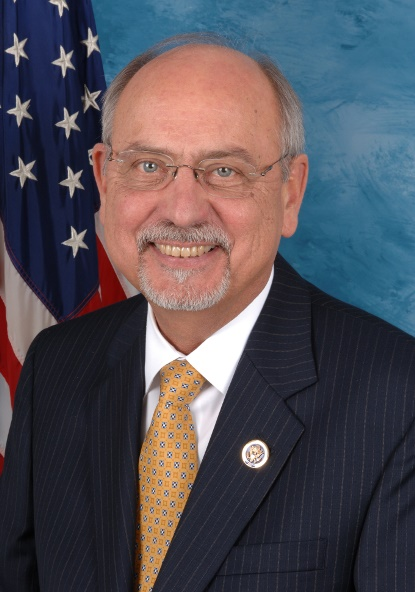

Nominee	Doc Hastings	Sandy Matheson
Party	Republican	Democratic
Popular vote	154,627	92,486
Percentage	62.6%	37.4%
- County results Hastings: 50–60% 60–70% 70–80%
U.S. Representative before election
Doc Hastings (inc.)
Republican
Elected U.S. Representative
Doc Hastings
Republican

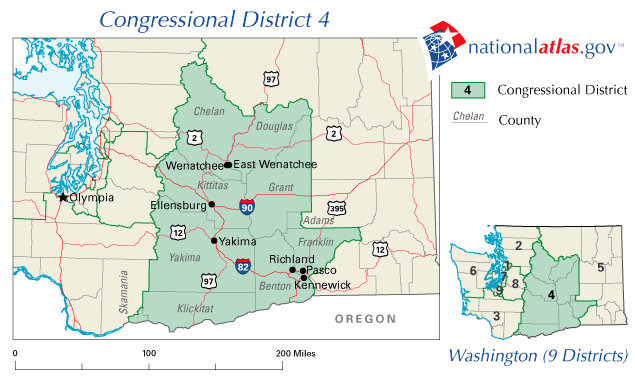

Incumbent Republican Congressman Doc Hastings, who won his first term in 1994 by defeating fellow Congressman Jay Inslee, ran for a sixth term in this conservative, central Washington-based district. Hastings faced Democratic nominee Sandy Matheson in the general election, whom he was able to defeat convincingly.

=== Predictions ===
Source	Ranking	As of
The Cook Political Report	Safe R	October 29, 2004
Sabato's Crystal Ball	Safe R	November 1, 2004

=== Results ===
2004 Washington's 4th congressional district election
Party	Candidate	Votes	%
Republican	Doc Hastings (inc.)	154,627	62.57
Democratic	Sandy Matheson	92,486	37.43
Total votes		247,113	100.00
Republican hold			

==== By county ====
County results
County	Doc Hastings Republican		Sandy Matheson Democratic		Margin		Total votes
County	#	%	#	%	#	%	Total votes
Adams (part)	1,749	68.70%	797	31.30%	952	37.39%	2,546
Benton	40,822	62.76%	24,224	37.24%	16,598	25.52%	65,046
Chelan	18,978	67.15%	9,282	32.85%	9,696	34.31%	28,260
Douglas	9,136	70.29%	3,862	29.71%	5,274	40.58%	12,998
Franklin	10,123	64.58%	5,552	35.42%	4,571	29.16%	15,675
Grant	17,989	71.27%	7,251	28.73%	10,738	42.54%	25,240
Kittitas	8,905	57.57%	6,562	42.43%	2,343	15.15%	15,467
Klickitat	5,127	57.74%	3,752	42.26%	1,375	15.49%	8,879
Skamania (part)	704	51.99%	650	48.01%	54	3.99%	1,354
Yakima	41,094	57.36%	30,554	42.64%	10,540	14.71%	71,648
Totals	154,627	62.57%	92,486	37.43%	62,141	25.15%	247,113

== District 5 ==
2004 Washington's 5th congressional district election
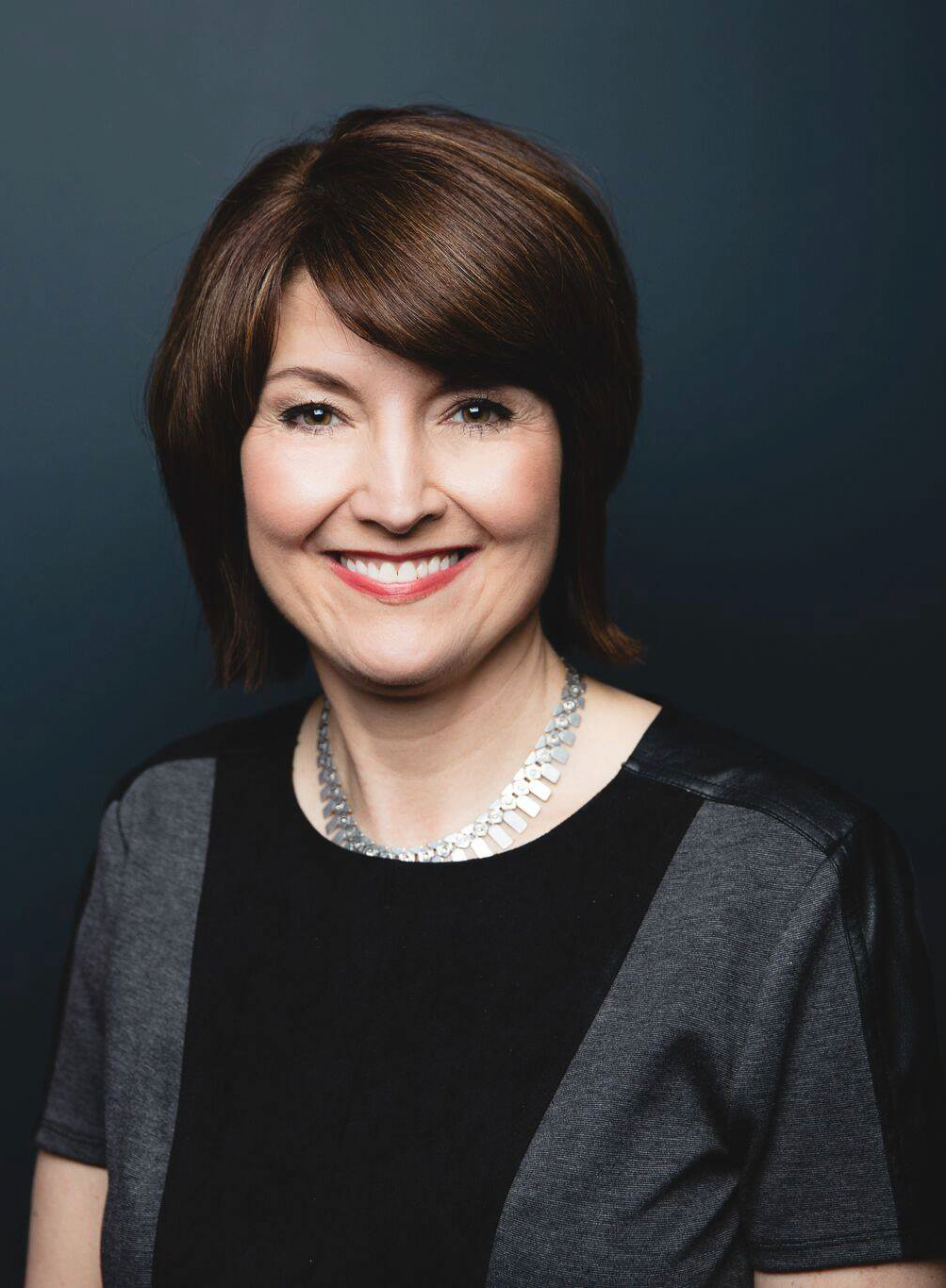

Nominee	Cathy McMorris Rodgers	Don Barbieri
Party	Republican	Democratic
Popular vote	179,600	121,333
Percentage	59.7%	40.3%
- County results McMorris: 50–60% 60–70% 70–80%
U.S. Representative before election
George Nethercutt
Republican
Elected U.S. Representative
Cathy McMorris Rodgers
Republican

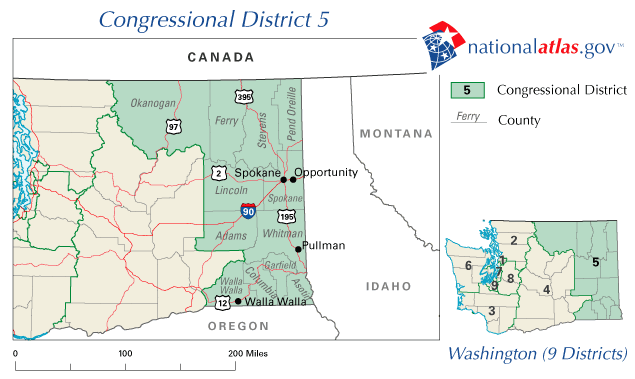

When incumbent Republican Congressman George Nethercutt opted to run for Senate instead of seeking a sixth term, an open seat was created. The Minority Leader of the Washington House of Representatives, Cathy McMorris, emerged as the Republican nominee, while Don Barbieri, a well-known developer based in Spokane became the Democratic nominee. McMorris was able to defeat Barbieri by a wide margin to win her first term in Congress.

=== Predictions ===
Source	Ranking	As of
The Cook Political Report	Lean R	October 29, 2004
Sabato's Crystal Ball	Lean R	November 1, 2004

=== Results ===
2004 Washington's 5th congressional district election
Party	Candidate	Votes	%
Republican	Cathy McMorris Rodgers	179,600	59.68
Democratic	Don Barbieri	121,333	40.32
Total votes		300,933	100.00
Republican hold			

==== By county ====
County results
County	Cathy McMorris Rodgers Republican		Don Barbieri Democratic		Margin		Total votes
County	#	%	#	%	#	%	Total votes
Adams (part)	1,875	76.62%	572	23.38%	1,303	53.25%	2,447
Asotin	5,033	59.60%	3,412	40.40%	1,621	19.19%	8,445
Columbia	1,449	70.14%	617	29.86%	832	40.27%	2,066
Ferry	2,272	69.29%	1,007	30.71%	1,265	38.58%	3,279
Garfield	932	73.33%	339	26.67%	593	46.66%	1,271
Lincoln	4,234	74.37%	1,459	25.63%	2,775	48.74%	5,693
Okanogan	10,055	64.73%	5,478	35.27%	4,577	29.47%	15,533
Pend Oreille	4,098	68.02%	1,927	31.98%	2,171	36.03%	6,025
Spokane	113,171	57.23%	84,565	42.77%	28,606	14.47%	197,736
Stevens	13,377	69.95%	5,747	30.05%	7,630	39.90%	19,124
Walla Walla	13,512	61.49%	8,461	38.51%	5,051	22.99%	21,973
Whitman	9,592	55.31%	7,749	44.69%	1,843	10.63%	17,341
Totals	179,600	59.68%	121,333	40.32%	58,267	19.36%	300,933

== District 6 ==
2004 Washington's 6th congressional district election
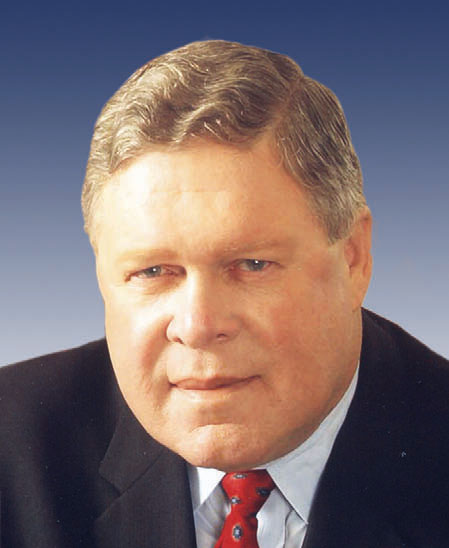

Nominee	Norm Dicks	Doug Cloud
Party	Democratic	Republican
Popular vote	202,919	91,228
Percentage	69.0%	31.0%
- County results Dicks: 50–60% 60–70% 70–80%
U.S. Representative before election
Norm Dicks (inc.)
Democratic
Elected U.S. Representative
Norm Dicks
Democratic

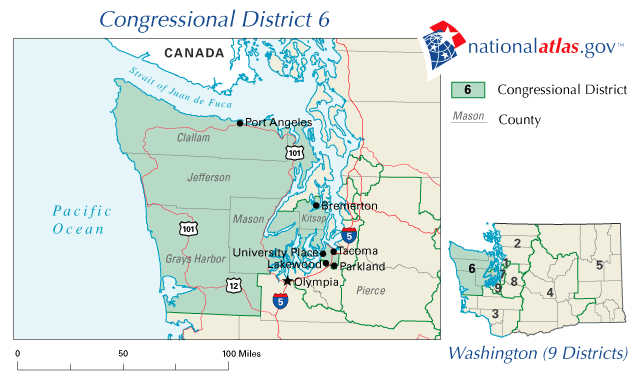

Congressman Norm Dicks, the dean of the Washington congressional delegation, sought a fifteenth term in this liberal-leaning district based on the Kitsap Peninsula. Dicks faced perennial candidate and conservative activist Doug Cloud in the general election, but he was able to trump Cloud to seal another term in Congress.

=== Predictions ===
Source	Ranking	As of
The Cook Political Report	Safe D	October 29, 2004
Sabato's Crystal Ball	Safe D	November 1, 2004

=== Results ===
2004 Washington's 6th congressional district election
Party	Candidate	Votes	%
Democratic	Norm Dicks (inc.)	202,919	68.99
Republican	Doug Cloud	91,228	31.01
Total votes		294,147	100.00
Democratic hold			

==== By county ====
County results
County	Norm Dicks Democratic		Doug Cloud Republican		Margin		Total votes
County	#	%	#	%	#	%	Total votes
Clallam	20,710	59.35%	14,184	40.65%	6,526	18.70%	34,894
Grays Harbor	18,879	70.53%	7,888	29.47%	10,991	41.06%	26,767
Jefferson	13,077	72.82%	4,882	27.18%	8,195	45.63%	17,959
Kitsap (part)	39,300	70.42%	16,506	29.58%	22,794	40.85%	55,806
Mason	16,200	67.09%	7,946	32.91%	8,254	34.18%	24,146
Pierce (part)	94,753	70.41%	39,822	29.59%	54,931	40.82%	134,575
Totals	202,919	68.99%	91,228	31.01%	111,691	37.97%	294,147

== District 7 ==
2004 Washington's 7th congressional district election
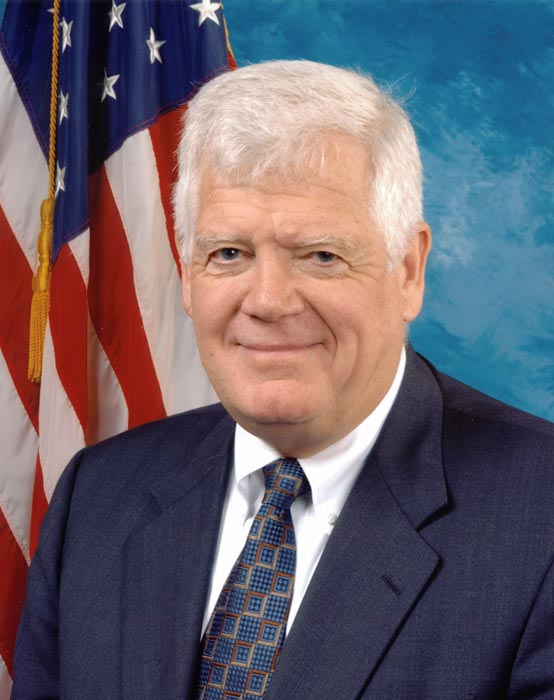

Nominee	Jim McDermott	Carol Cassady
Party	Democratic	Republican
Popular vote	272,302	65,226
Percentage	80.7%	19.3%
- County results McDermott: 80–90%
U.S. Representative before election
Jim McDermott (inc.)
Democratic
Elected U.S. Representative
Jim McDermott
Democratic

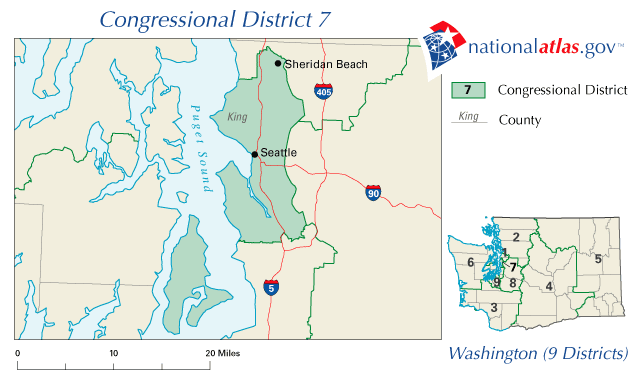

Incumbent Democratic Congressman Jim McDermott, who has represented this solidly liberal district based in Seattle since he was first elected in 1988, ran for an eighth term in 2004. Facing Republican candidate Carol Cassady, McDermott was able to easily take victory, winning by the largest margin out of any Congressman that year in his state.

=== Predictions ===
Source	Ranking	As of
The Cook Political Report	Safe D	October 29, 2004
Sabato's Crystal Ball	Safe D	November 1, 2004

=== Results ===
2004 Washington's 7th congressional district election
Party	Candidate	Votes	%
Democratic	Jim McDermott (inc.)	272,302	80.68
Republican	Carol Cassady	65,226	19.32
Total votes		337,528	100.00
Democratic hold			

==== By county ====
County results
County	Jim McDermott Democratic		Carol Cassady Republican		Margin		Total votes
County	#	%	#	%	#	%	Total votes
King (part)	272,302	80.68%	65,226	19.32%	207,076	61.35%	337,528
Totals	272,302	80.68%	65,226	19.32%	207,076	61.35%	337,528

== District 8 ==
2004 Washington's 8th congressional district election
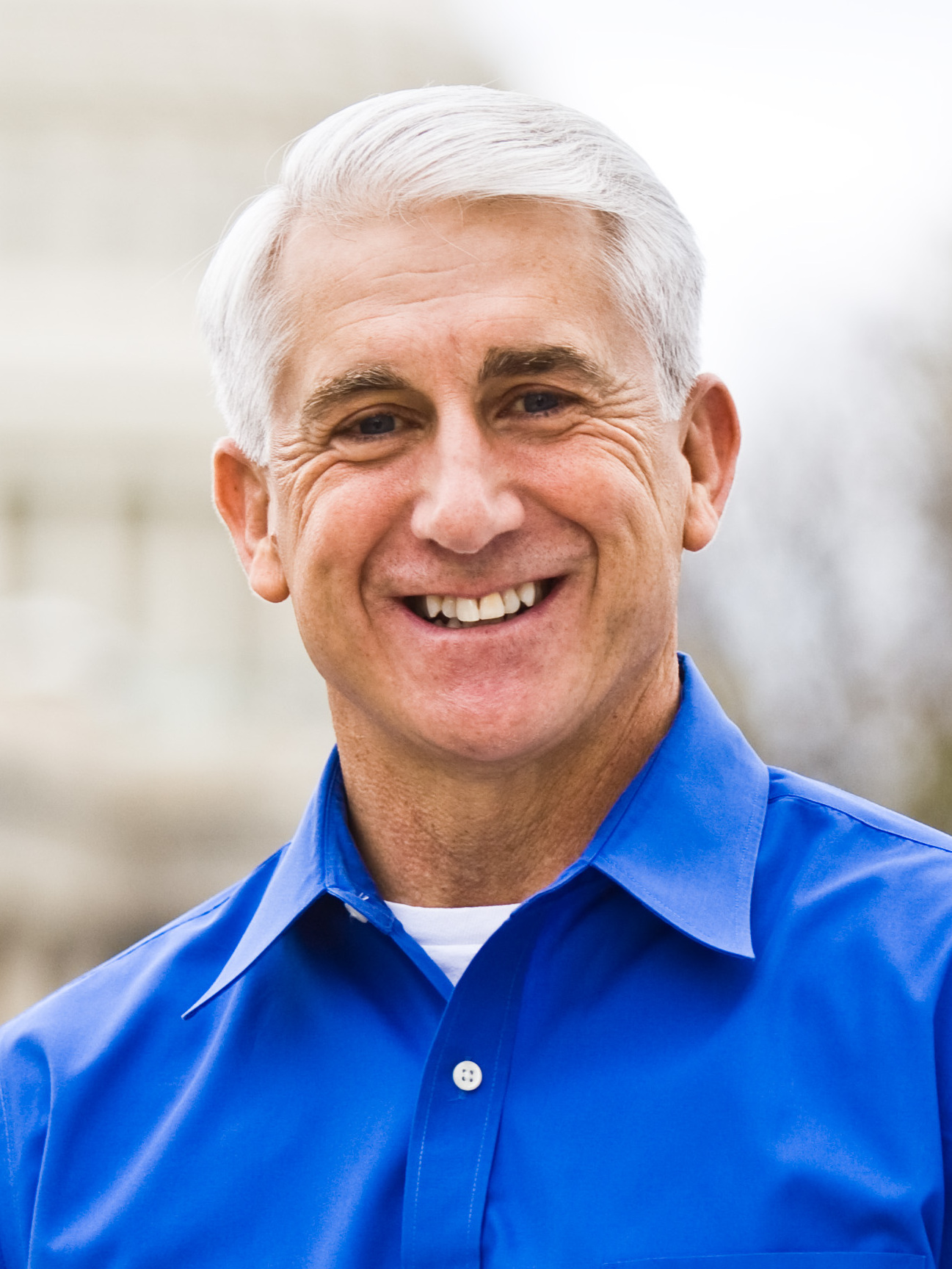

Nominee	Dave Reichert	Dave Ross
Party	Republican	Democratic
Popular vote	173,298	157,148
Percentage	51.5%	46.7%
- County results Reichert: 40–50% 50–60%
U.S. Representative before election
Jennifer Dunn
Republican
Elected U.S. Representative
Dave Reichert
Republican

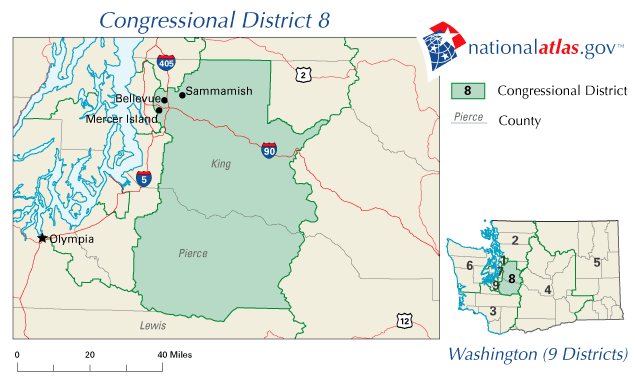

Incumbent Republican Congresswoman Jennifer Dunn declined to seek a seventh term in this increasingly liberal district based in the eastern suburbs of Seattle and encompassing much of King County. King County Sheriff Dave Reichert became the Republican nominee. The Democratic primary attracted national attention with three major candidates: Heidi Behrens-Benedict, the Democratic nominee for the congressional seat in 1998, 2000, and 2002; former RealNetworks attorney Alex Alben; and KIRO radio host Dave Ross. Ross won the primary and ran as the Democratic nominee. Despite a grueling battle and the fact that the Democratic nominee for president, John Kerry, won the district that year, Reichert managed to pull out a thin victory and went to Congress for his first term.

=== Predictions ===
Source	Ranking	As of
The Cook Political Report	Tossup	October 29, 2004
Sabato's Crystal Ball	Tilt R	November 1, 2004

=== Results ===
2004 Washington's 8th congressional district election
Party	Candidate	Votes	%
Republican	Dave Reichert	173,298	51.50
Democratic	Dave Ross	157,148	46.70
Libertarian	Spencer Garrett	6,053	1.80
Total votes		336,499	100.00
Republican hold			

==== By county ====
County results
County	Dave Reichert Republican		Dave Ross Democratic		Spencer Garrett Libertarian		Margin		Total votes
County	#	%	#	%	#	%	#	%	Total votes
King (part)	135,475	49.95%	131,085	48.33%	4,645	1.71%	4,390	1.62%	271,205
Pierce (part)	37,823	57.93%	26,063	39.92%	1,408	2.16%	11,760	18.01%	65,294
Totals	173,298	51.50%	157,148	46.70%	6,053	1.80%	16,150	4.80%	336,499

== District 9 ==
2004 Washington's 9th congressional district election
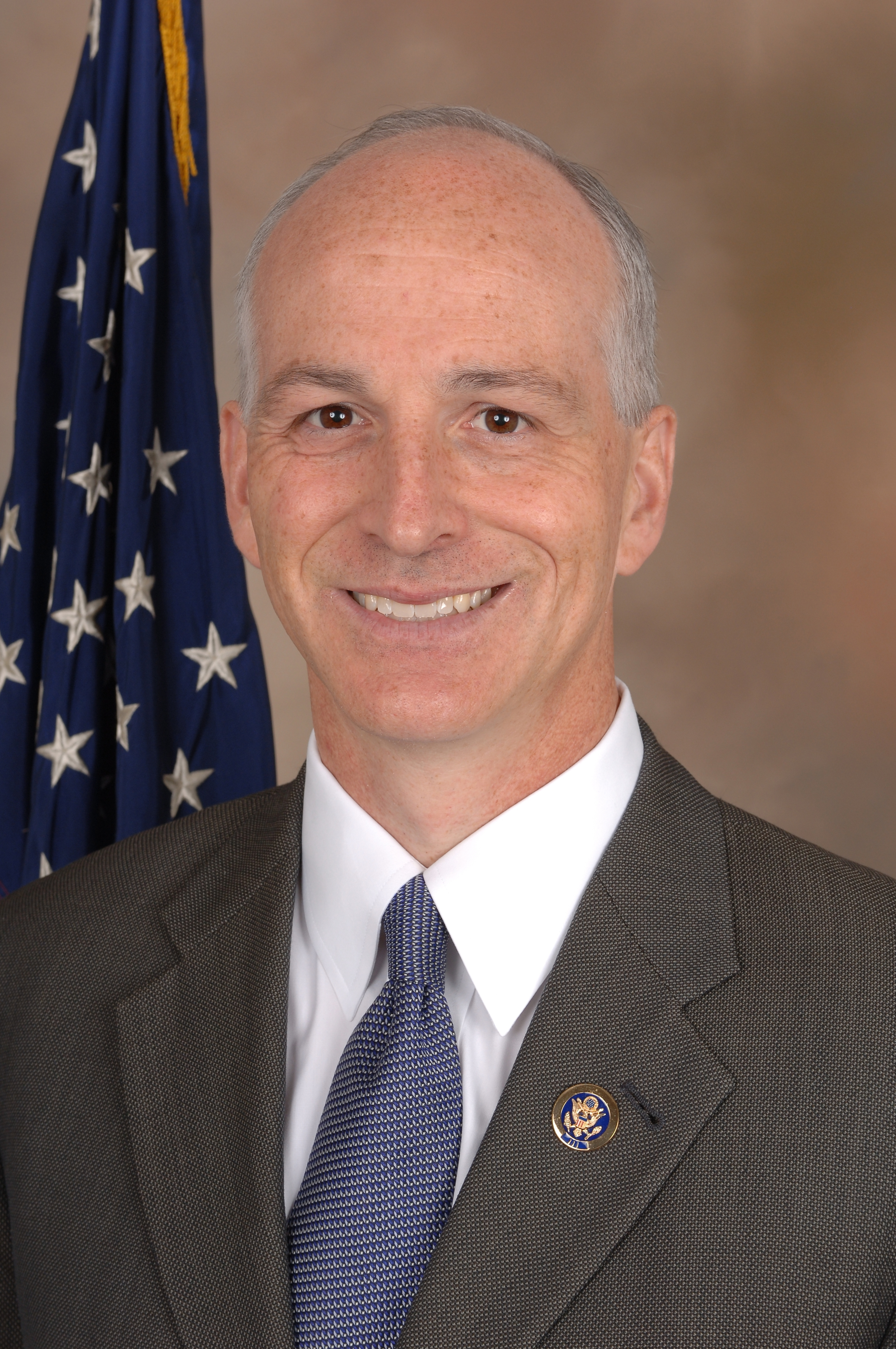

Nominee	Adam Smith	Paul J. Lord
Party	Democratic	Republican
Popular vote	162,433	88,304
Percentage	63.3%	34.4%
- County results Smith: 50–60% 60–70%
U.S. Representative before election
Adam Smith (inc.)
Democratic
Elected U.S. Representative
Adam Smith
Democratic

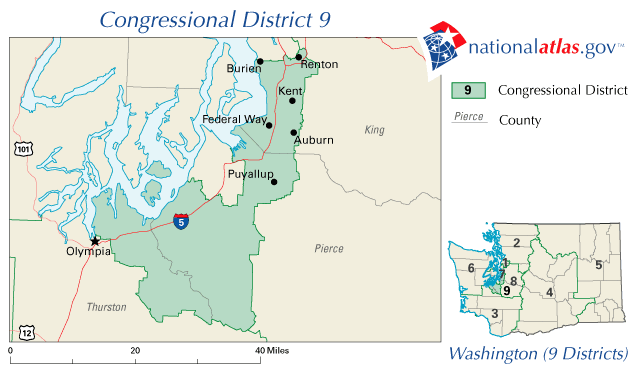

This district has been represented by Democratic Congressman Adam Smith since he was first elected in 1996. Covering the densely populated area from the suburbs of Seattle to the northern portion of Olympia, the district has a moderately liberal population with a tendency to support Democratic candidates. Congressman Smith did not face a serious challenge from Republican Paul Lord and Green Party candidate Robert Posey and was re-elected to a fifth term with ease.

=== Predictions ===
Source	Ranking	As of
The Cook Political Report	Safe D	October 29, 2004
Sabato's Crystal Ball	Safe D	November 1, 2004

=== Results ===
2004 Washington's 9th congressional district election
Party	Candidate	Votes	%
Democratic	Adam Smith (inc.)	162,433	63.28
Republican	Paul J. Lord	88,304	34.40
Green	Robert F. Losey	5,934	2.31
Total votes		256,671	100.00
Democratic hold			

==== By county ====
County results
County	Adam Smith Democratic		Paul J. Lord Republican		Robert F. Losey Green		Margin		Total votes
County	#	%	#	%	#	%	#	%	Total votes
King (part)	78,126	67.01%	35,659	30.59%	2,800	2.40%	42,467	36.43%	116,585
Pierce (part)	58,621	59.95%	37,345	38.19%	1,815	1.86%	21,276	21.76%	97,781
Thurston (part)	25,686	60.72%	15,300	36.17%	1,319	3.12%	10,386	24.55%	42,305
Totals	162,433	63.28%	88,304	34.40%	5,934	2.31%	74,129	28.88%	256,671
