= Preserving Welfare for Needs Not Weed Act =

Proposed American bill

- Long title: To prohibit assistance provided under the program of block grants to States for temporary assistance for needy families from being accessed through the use of an electronic benefit transfer card at any store that offers marijuana for sale.
- Announced in: the 113th United States Congress
- Sponsored by: Rep. David G. Reichert (R, WA-8)
- Number of co-sponsors: 11

Codification
- U.S.C. sections affected: 42 U.S.C. § 608

Legislative history
- Introduced in the House as H.R. 4137 by Rep. David G. Reichert (R, WA-8) on March 4, 2014; Committee consideration by United States House Committee on Ways and Means; Passed the House on September 16, 2014 (voice vote)

The Preserving Welfare for Needs Not Weed Act (H.R. 4137) is a bill that would prevent the use of electronic benefit transfer cards in businesses that sell marijuana.

The bill was introduced into the United States House of Representatives during the 113th United States Congress.

== Background ==
Colorado and Washington both allow residents to buy marijuana legally.

Existing law bans the use of welfare funds at strip clubs, liquor stores, and casinos.

== Provisions of the bill ==
This summary is based largely on the summary provided by the Congressional Research Service, a public domain source.

The Preserving Welfare for Needs Not Weed Act would amend part A (Temporary Assistance for Needy Families) (TANF) of title IV of the Social Security Act (SSA) to require a state receiving a TANF grant to maintain policies and practices necessary to prevent assistance under the TANF program from being used in any electronic benefit transfer (via a card) at any establishment that offers marijuana for sale.

== Procedural history ==
The Preserving Welfare for Needs Not Weed Act was introduced into the United States House of Representatives on March 4, 2014, by Rep. David G. Reichert (R, WA-8). The bill was referred to the United States House Committee on Ways and Means. On September 16, 2014, the House voted in a voice vote to pass the bill.

The 2018 JOBS bill included a “Preserving Welfare for Needs not Weed” provision.

== Debate and discussion ==
An article on the passage of the bill that was published by ThinkProgress accused the bill of "stigmatizing welfare recipients as druggies." The article described several studies into the drug usage of people on welfare, all of them finding that people on welfare use illegal drugs at a lower rate than the general population.

== See also ==
- List of bills in the 113th United States Congress
