= Darcy Burner =

American businesswoman and politician

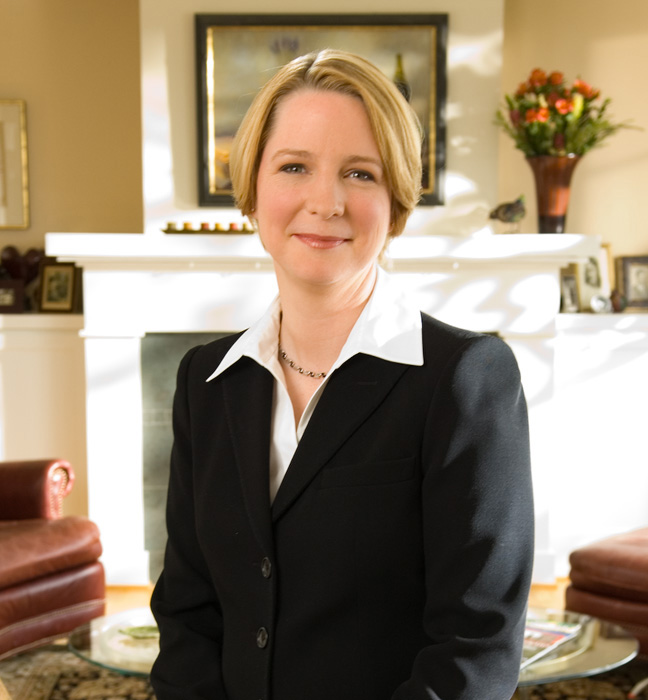
- Burner in 2009

Personal details
- Born: November 12, 1970 (age 55)
- Party: Democratic
- Spouses: Jonathan S. Shapiro (m. 2015; div. 2025); Mike Burner (m. 1993; div. 2015)
- Children: 1
- Education: Harvard
- Website: darcyburner.com

Darcy Gibbons Burner (born November 12, 1970) is an American businesswoman and politician and a member of the Democratic Party from Carnation, Washington.

== Early life, education, and family ==
Burner was adopted at birth in Alaska and grew up in a Republican household in Nebraska farm country. Her father, Ralph Gibbons, spent 20 years in the Air Force, settling after his military retirement with his wife and five kids in Fremont, Nebraska. Burner was the Civil Air Patrol National Cadet of the Year in 1989.

In high school, Burner was a National Merit Scholar. She worked multiple jobs, both part-time and full-time, to earn her way through Harvard University, graduating in 1996 with a B.A. in computer science with a special field of economics. She also briefly attended law school at the University of Washington in 2004. Her jobs included working for Lotus Development, Asymetrix, and, starting in 2000, as a lead product manager for Microsoft .NET.

Burner married in 1993. She and her former husband Michael have a son, Henry, born in 2003. After a 2015 divorce, she married Jonathan S. Shapiro.

== Career ==
Burner worked for twelve years in high technology, including five years at Microsoft as a Marketing Manager, working on .NET. Burner left Microsoft to attend law school at the University of Washington in 2004. She left her law studies in 2005 to enter her first political race against Reichert.

She served on the boards of a number of local and national organizations, including ActBlue, NARAL Pro-Choice America, the Netroots Foundation, the Center for International Policy, the Progressive Ideas Network, and Council for a Livable World's PeacePAC.

From 2009 to 2011 she was the president and executive director of ProgressiveCongress.org and the Progressive Congress Action Fund, non-profits associated with the Congressional Progressive Caucus. She was also a principal in the Afghanistan Study Group, whose report on ending the war in Afghanistan was endorsed by both Republicans and Democrats.

== Electoral history ==
Burner was the Democratic nominee for Washington's 8th congressional district in 2006 and 2008, losing to Republican incumbent Dave Reichert in both elections. She was then a candidate in the open primary for the newly redrawn Washington's 1st congressional district in 2012 finishing third behind Republican John Koster and Democrat Suzan DelBene. On February 22, 2016, she launched a campaign for the Washington state legislature in the 5th legislative district.

=== 2006 election ===
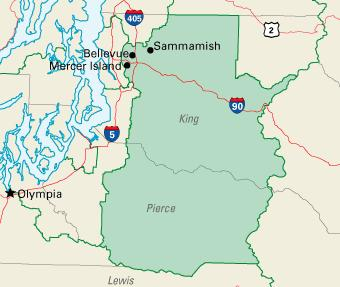
Eighth Congressional District of Washington

Burner had been a volunteer in the unsuccessful 2004 campaign of Dave Ross for Washington's 8th congressional district, an open seat, and was a local Democratic activist. In 2006, she became a first-time candidate running for the same seat against freshman Republican U.S. Representative Dave Reichert. She was supported via small dollar donors using the Democratic online fundraising website ActBlue, and both national parties spent heavily on the race.

Between August and October 2006, political commentary indicated growing support for the Democratic candidate, and multiple polls showed Burner in a virtual tie with Reichert with just weeks left before the election. In late October the two major Seattle newspapers split in their endorsements: The Seattle Post-Intelligencer endorsed Burner while the Seattle Times, which had endorsed Democrat Dave Ross in 2004, endorsed Reichert.

Burner conceded at a press conference on November 14, 2006. Dave Reichert's final margin of victory was 7,341, just over 2.9% of the votes.

=== 2008 election ===
Burner ran for the 8th district seat again in the 2008 election.

According to FEC reports, Burner outraised Dave Reichert in her campaign. One of her issues during the election cycle was an end to the war in Iraq. She wrote A Responsible Plan to End the War in Iraq, which was endorsed by more than 50 candidates for the U.S. House and U.S. Senate as well as Major General Paul Eaton, former Security Transition Commanding General in Iraq; Dr. Lawrence Korb, former Assistant Secretary of Defense in the Reagan Administration; Capt. Larry Seaquist, former commander of the U.S.S. Iowa and former Acting Deputy Secretary of Defense for Policy Planning; and Brigadier General John Johns, specialist in counterinsurgency and nationbuilding. The plan was cited on the floor of the U.S. House. Burner was briefly challenged in the 2008 Democratic primary by State Senator Rodney Tom, who endorsed her in September 2007.

Burner's home on Ames Lake, near Carnation, Washington, was completely destroyed by a fire during the 2008 campaign for Congress.

She conceded November 7, 2008, after The Associated Press determined that Reichert's lead for the 8th District seat was insurmountable. When all the ballots were tallied, Reichert had won with 53% of the vote compared to Burner's 47%.

=== 2012 election ===
Burner lost in the August primary election for the open seat in Washington's 1st congressional district, being vacated by Jay Inslee.

At the 2012 Netroots Nation conference in early June 2012, Burner was a keynote speaker who asked the women in attendance if they had had an abortion and were willing to let it be known. She is quoted as having said, "If you are a woman in this room who has had an abortion and is willing to come out about it, please stand up." Later she explained, "The people who don’t want them to be able to stand up, who don’t want people to stand with them, are the people who are trying to shame them into silence and it’s long past time we stopped giving into them." She further said during the Keynote "People think they don't know women who've had abortions, when in fact their mothers or their sisters or their co-workers or their friends often have. Women being able to come out of the closet and being able to say 'I've had an abortion' would change people's view of what it meant."

=== 2016 election ===
In February 2016, Darcy Burner began running for the Washington House of Representatives, seeking to represent 5th Legislative District. On February 17, she received the endorsement of the 5th Legislative District Democrats. This nomination was also sought by Matt Larson (D), the Mayor of Snoqualmie. In the August 2016 primary, Burner finished in the top two with Republican Paul Graves, a Seattle attorney whose practice focuses on toxic torts. Graves and Burner moved on to face each other in the November general election. Graves defeated Burner.

== Views ==
Burner describes herself as a "practical progressive". Her positions include pro-choice on abortion, repeal of the Defense of Marriage Act, support for stem cell research, and extending military health coverage to families of Reservists and National Guardsmen.
