= Preventing Sex Trafficking and Improving Opportunities for Youth in Foster Care Act =

Bill introduced in the 113th Congress

- Long title: To prevent and address sex trafficking of youth in foster care.
- Announced in: the 113th United States Congress
- Sponsored by: Rep. David G. Reichert (R, WA-8)
- Number of co-sponsors: 16

Codification
- U.S.C. sections affected: 42 U.S.C. § 675, 42 U.S.C. § 671, 22 U.S.C. § 7102, 42 U.S.C. § 622, 12 U.S.C. § 1813, and others.
- Agencies affected: Social Security Administration, United States Congress, Federal Bureau of Investigation, Department of Health and Human Services

Legislative history
- Introduced in the House as H.R. 4058 by David Reichert (R–WA) and Lloyd Doggett (D-TX) on February 14, 2014; Committee consideration by United States House Committee on Ways and Means

The Preventing Sex Trafficking and Improving Opportunities for Youth in Foster Care Act (H.R. 4058) is a bill introduced in the 113th Congress in 2014. The bill would require states to take action to address the problem of sex trafficking of foster care children.

== Major provisions ==
If enacted, the bill would (1) Require states to identify and report child sex trafficking victims; (2) Improve data collection; (3) Require states to create standards to give foster parents more flexibility in raising foster children; (4) Prohibit states from designating long-term foster care as the ultimate goal for children in foster care, instead attempting to place the children in permanent homes; (5) Give foster children more input in their own case plans.

The bill also would require states to make sure that foster children over aged 14 have a Social Security card, birth certificate and medical records.

== Legislative history ==
The bill was originally introduced by Republican Congressman Dave Reichert of Washington and Democratic Congressman Lloyd Doggett of Texas. Fifteen additional Members of Congress signed onto the bill as original cosponsors including Congressmen Vern Buchanan, Tim Griffin and Jim Renacci.

On October 23, 2013, the House Human Resources Subcommittee held a hearing on sex trafficking of youth in foster care. Witnesses who testified at the hearing included members of Congress, activists for the issue, and a victim of trafficking. On December 20, 2013, the subcommittee wrote and publicized a draft bill.

The American Bar Association, American Public Human Services Association, and National Indian Child Welfare Association responded to the subcommittee's request for public comments with suggestions to improve the bill.

Similar bills were introduced in Congress in 2013:

- S. 1118: Child Sex Trafficking Data and Response Act of 2013 introduced by Senators Ron Wyden and Rob Portman.
- S. 1870: Supporting At-Risk Children Act introduced by Senator Max Baucus
- S. 1518: Improving Outcomes for Youth At Risk for Sex Trafficking Act of 2013 introduced by Senator Orrin Hatch, parts of which were included in the Supporting At-Risk Children Act

== Prostitution link ==
Some media coverage of the bill highlighted the link between sex trafficking victims and prostitution. For example, in its coverage of the bill, the Sky Valley Chronicle, an online newspaper covering East Snohomish County, Washington, said that sex trafficking has reached "epidemic levels" in certain areas of the world, and that anyone engaged in prostitution under age 18 in the U.S. is considered a victim of sex trafficking.

In a blog post, the Seattle Post-Intelligencer wrote, "The legislation is an implicit admission that a lot of the prostitution enforcement that [Congressman] Reichert used to do with the King County Sheriffs Office was misguided."

Seattle's local CBS TV station, KIRO, noted in an article on its website that Reichert was a detective during the murder spree of "Green River killer" Gary Ridgway, and that many of the victims were prostitutes and runaways.

== See also ==
- List of bills in the 113th United States Congress
