= Permanent S Corporation Built-in Gains Recognition Period Act of 2014 =

- Long title: To amend the Internal Revenue Code of 1986 to make permanent the reduced recognition period for built-in gains of S corporations.
- Announced in: the 113th United States Congress
- Sponsored by: Rep. David G. Reichert (R, WA-8)
- Number of co-sponsors: 1

Legislative history
- Introduced in the House as H.R. 4453 by Rep. David G. Reichert (R, WA-8) on April 10, 2014; Committee consideration by United States House Committee on Ways and Means

The Permanent S Corporation Built-in Gains Recognition Period Act of 2014 (H.R. 4453) is a bill that would amend the Internal Revenue Code of 1986 to reduce from 10 to 5 years the period during which the built-in gains of an S corporation are subject to tax and to make such reduction permanent. An S corporation is a closely held corporation that makes a valid election to be taxed under Subchapter S of Chapter 1 of the Internal Revenue Code so that the corporation does not pay federal taxes, instead passing on all income, losses, and credits to the shareholders who pay the taxes.

The bill was introduced into the United States House of Representatives during the 113th United States Congress.

== Background ==
The S corporation tax credit expired at the end of 2013.

== Provisions of the bill ==
This summary is based largely on the summary provided by the Congressional Research Service, a public domain source.

The Permanent S Corporation Built-in Gains Recognition Period Act of 2014 would amend the Internal Revenue Code of 1986 to reduce from 10 to 5 years the period during which the built-in gains of an S corporation are subject to tax and to make such reduction permanent.

== Congressional Budget Office report ==
This summary is based largely on the summary provided by the Congressional Budget Office, as ordered reported by the House Committee on Ways and Means on April 29, 2014. This is a public domain source.

H.R. 4453 would amend the Internal Revenue Code to make permanent a five-year recognition period for built-in gains of S corporations, retroactive to January 1, 2014. Under current law, a corporation that meets certain requirements may elect to be taxed as an S corporation, which generally pays no corporate-level tax, unlike a C corporation. For corporations that convert from C corporations to S corporations, or S corporations that receive assets under certain conditions from C corporations, there is a corporate-level tax on certain built-in gains of certain assets, with a 10-year recognition period under current law. This legislation makes permanent the five-year recognition period for S corporation built-in gains that was generally in effect for taxable years from 2011 through 2013. The legislation also applies to regulated investment companies and real estate investment trusts.

The staff of the Joint Committee on Taxation (JCT) estimates that enacting H.R. 4453 would reduce revenues, thus increasing federal deficits, by $1.5 billion over the 2014-2024 period.

The Statutory Pay-As-You-Go Act of 2010 establishes budget-reporting and enforcement procedures for legislation affecting direct spending and revenues. Enacting H.R. 4453 would result in revenue losses in each year beginning in 2015.

JCT has determined that the bill contains no intergovernmental or private-sector mandates as defined in the Unfunded Mandates Reform Act.

== Procedural history ==
The Permanent S Corporation Built-in Gains Recognition Period Act of 2014 was introduced into the United States House of Representatives on April 10, 2014 by Rep. David G. Reichert (R, WA-8). It was referred to the United States House Committee on Ways and Means. It was reported (amended) by the committee on May 2, 2014 alongside House Report 113-429. The bill was scheduled to be considered on the House floor on June 10, 2014.

== Debate and discussion ==
The Subchapter S Bank Association supported the bill because the organization "supports making the five-year recognition period for built in gains permanent." Jim Redpath argued that a shorter period would be better because "ten years is a long time and certainly not cognizant of current business-planning cycles. Many times I have experienced changes in the business environment or the economy which prompted S corporations to need access to their own capital, that if taken would trigger this prohibitive tax. This results in business owners not making the appropriate decision for the business and its stakeholders simply because of the BIG tax."

== See also ==
- List of bills in the 113th United States Congress
