= Dave Ross =

American journalist

- Born: 1952 (age 73–74); Yorktown, New York
- Education: Cornell University
- Occupation: Radio broadcaster
- Known for: The Dave Ross Show
- Board member of: Seattle Transportation Choices Coalition; Economic Opportunity Institute
- Spouse: Patti Ross
- Children: Caitlin Ross; Emilie Ross
- Awards: 2001 RTNDA Edward R. Murrow Award for Best Commentary; 2005 RTNDA Edward R. Murrow Award for Best Commentary

Dave Ross (born April 10, 1952) is an American retired broadcast journalist who was a long-time talk show host on Seattle's KIRO-FM radio station. He joined KIRO as a news anchor in 1978 and was given his own talk show in 1987. He has sometimes broadcast his show while on assignment in other locations, including overseas, such as Baghdad, Iraq in April 2004. Ross was also heard on the CBS Radio Network, where he provided daily political commentary. He retired in 2024.

Ross was the 2004 Democratic Party candidate for the U.S. House of Representatives for Washington's 8th congressional district. For more than three decades in his spare time he has been performing with the Seattle Gilbert and Sullivan Society.

== Broadcast career ==
Born into a Catholic family in Yorktown Heights, New York, Ross is the son of a commercial artist and has a brother and two sisters. He started his broadcast career at the age of 15 at WVIP in Mt. Kisco, New York. After graduating from Cornell University in 1973, where he was a member of the Cornell University Glee Club, The Hangovers, and the Quill and Dagger society, Ross worked as a reporter at WSB in Atlanta, Georgia from 1973 to 1978.

The same year he joined radio station KIRO (AM) in Seattle as a news anchor. In addition to his talk show, Ross broadcast a national daily commentary on the CBS Radio Network. From 1983 to 2004 he hosted and produced the first syndicated daily radio report on computers, for the Associated Press, called Chip Talk. He was also part of the 1995 Launch Team for CNET, where he contributed segments called The Last Word to c|net central. Since 1992, Ross has also filled in for CBS Radio colleague Charles Osgood on his "Osgood File" commentaries. Ross has broadcast from overseas or outside Seattle to cover various historic events. For example, on the eve of the 2003 invasion of Iraq, Ross traveled to the Persian Gulf to broadcast his radio show from Qatar. Other field trips included forays to cover the Pope's visit to Britain in 1982, trips to China in 1984 and the Soviet Union in 1987, the toppling of the Berlin Wall and the revolution in Czechoslovakia in 1989, the 1992 Rodney King riots Los Angeles, a 2002 trip to Jerusalem after a series of suicide bombings, a trip to Baghdad in April 2004 and many others.

Ross has generally been portrayed as liberal (although he has also been called a moderate), but is also known for bringing those with opposing conservative views on his radio program to interview and debate. According to the Seattle Times: "Ross listens, circles around guests with Socratic questions, then makes sharp observations but never goes for the jugular.... [He] remains gracious." In addition to his editorials, Ross is also known for his "flitch" songs (songs using existing melodies, but with new lyrics, usually based on current events) and often sings one as part of his radio show and CBS segments. The Seattle Times wrote that "the best of [these] could stand alongside those of the legendary Tom Lehrer."

Ross received the 2001 and 2005 RTNDA Edward R. Murrow Award for Best Commentary. He was unable to accept the 2001 award personally, however, because the ceremony was scheduled for September 12, 2001. He was booked on a flight to Nashville on September 11, 2001, but instead ended up on assignment in New York City covering the terrorist attacks. Ross has also received a Marconi Award nomination and Clarion and Gabriel Awards. He was voted "Best Talk Show Host" by the Seattle Weekly.

In 2013, Ross began to host the Seattle Morning News. He retired from radio broadcasting on December 19, 2024, with his last show on SMN. Seattle Mayor Bruce Harrell appeared on Ross's final episode to read a proclamation that declared that day "Dave Ross Day", and Governor Jay Inslee called in to the show.

== Personal life ==
Ross has served as President of the St. Monica's school commission, a member of the Eastside Board of Catholic Community Services, and he was on the steering committee of the Campaign 5000 African-American community development bank. As of 2007, he served on the boards of the Seattle Transportation Choices Coalition and Economic Opportunity Institute.

He met his wife Patti at Cornell, and they married in 1973. They have two daughters, Caitlin and Emilie.

== 2004 US House election ==
In May 2004, Ross announced his candidacy for the United States House of Representatives for Washington's 8th congressional district as a Democrat. He began a leave of absence from KIRO at noon on July 23, 2004, to coincide with the beginning of his active candidacy. The seat was held by Republican Jennifer Dunn, who retired in 2004.

In the primary election held on September 14, 2004, Ross decisively defeated fellow Democrats Alex Alben and Heidi Behrens-Benedict. In the general election against King County Sheriff Dave Reichert in the general election on November 2, 2004, anti-Ross advertisements paid for by the National Republican Congressional Committee said that Ross "empowered terrorists" and that he would "wave a white flag" against them. The commercials said that Ross supported cuts to defense spending by $100 billion, but in fact Ross' statement was that he opposed the $100 billion missile-defense system sought by the Bush administration.

CQPolitics described the race this way: "Reichert's record as sheriff – which included capture of the notorious "Green River" serial killer – enabled him to defeat Democrat Dave Ross, a well-known Seattle-based radio talk show host, in 2004 with 51.5 percent and a 5 percentage-point margin." Ross returned to his talk show the following day.

== Seattle Gilbert and Sullivan Society performances ==
Ross is a member of the Seattle Gilbert and Sullivan Society, and has regularly appeared in their summer performances at Seattle Center, playing over 30 roles with the company. A 2006 review commented that "Ross, in his 27th season with the company, underplays the Major-General masterfully—snappy, energetic, not too mannered. ... [His] grand and hilarious [entrance] scene, especially at the insouciantly zippy tempo Ross takes, provided a lift and exhilaration I haven't felt in a while from any musical performance." Ross has received many warm reviews for his portrayal of the famous Gilbert & Sullivan "patter" roles and other baritone roles in the Savoy operas. At the International Gilbert and Sullivan Festival in Buxton, England, he played the role of Rudolph in the company's The Grand Duke in 1999 and also appeared at the festival in 1996.
