= Dave Reichert =

American politician (born 1950)

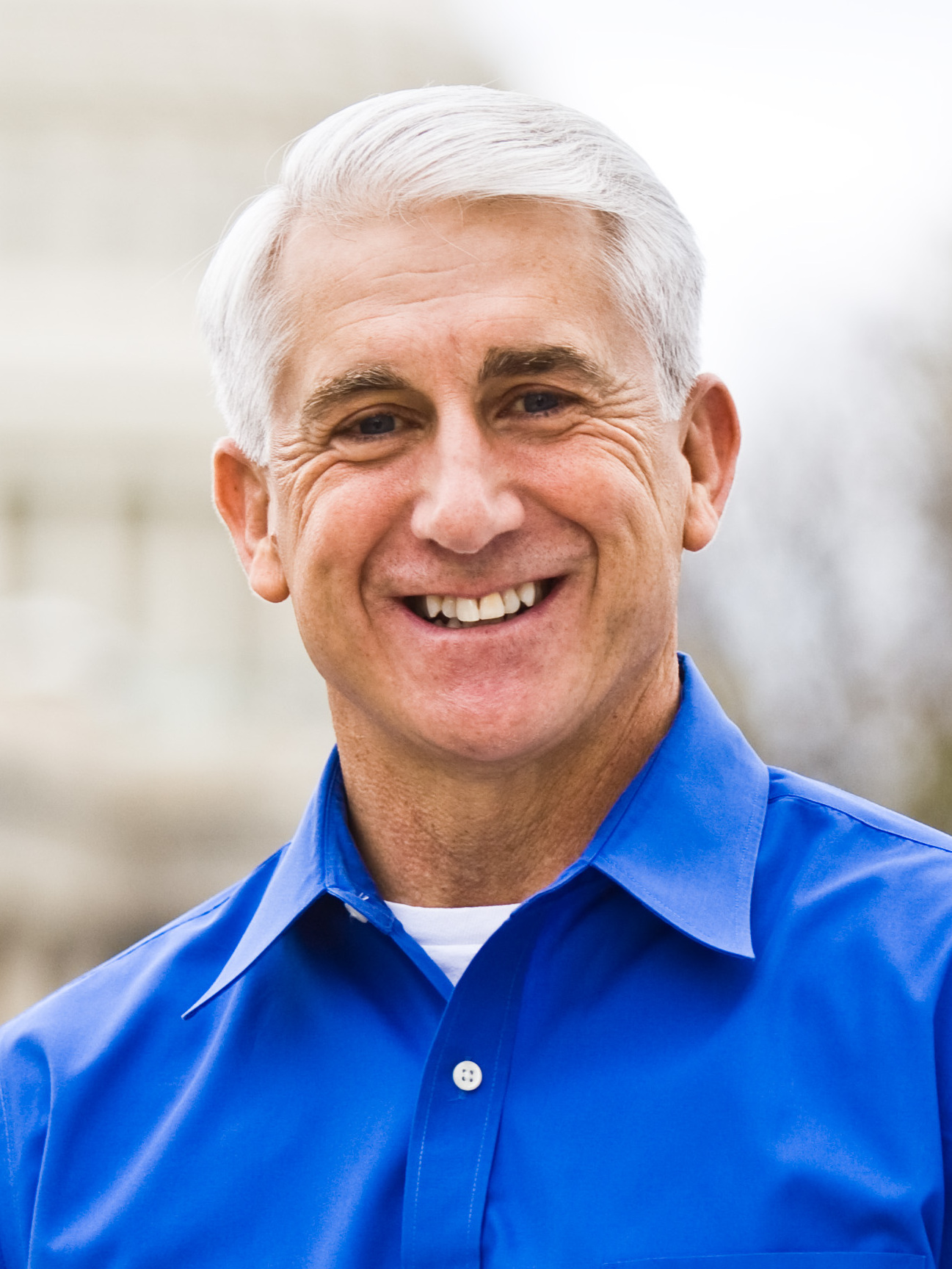
- Official portrait, 2007

Member of the U.S. House of Representatives from Washington's 8th district
- In office January 3, 2005 – January 3, 2019
- Preceded by: Jennifer Dunn
- Succeeded by: Kim Schrier

30th Sheriff of King County
- In office March 5, 1997 – January 3, 2005
- Preceded by: James Montgomery
- Succeeded by: Sue Rahr

Personal details
- Born: David George Reichert; August 29, 1950 (age 76) Detroit Lakes, Minnesota, U.S.
- Party: Republican
- Spouse: Julie Reichert
- Children: 3
- Education: Concordia University, Oregon (AA)

Military service
- Branch/service: United States Air Force
- Years of service: 1971–1976
- Unit: U.S. Air Force Reserve

David George Reichert (/ˈraɪkərt/ RY-kərt; born August 29, 1950) is an American retired police officer and politician who served as the U.S. representative for Washington's 8th congressional district from 2005 to 2019. A moderate member of the Republican Party, he served as the sheriff of King County, Washington from 1997 to 2005.

In September 2017, Reichert announced he would retire from Congress after his seventh term.

Reichert unsuccessfully ran for governor in 2024, losing to Democrat Bob Ferguson.

== Early life, education, and military career ==
Reichert was born in Detroit Lakes, Minnesota, the son of Marlys Ann (née Troeger) and George F. Reichert. He is the eldest of seven children and a grandson of the town marshal. His family moved to Washington in 1951, living first in Renton, then later moving to Kent, where he attended Kent Meridian High School. In 1968, he graduated and went to Concordia Lutheran College in Portland, Oregon on a partial football scholarship. He earned an Associate of Arts degree in social work in 1970.

In 1971 he joined the Air Force Reserves' 939th Military Airlift Group. He saw active duty for six months and served until 1976.

== Law enforcement career ==
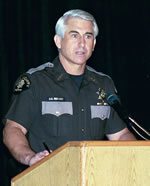
Reichert talks about crime prevention

Reichert began serving with the King County Sheriff's Office (KCSO) in 1972. He was a member of the Green River Task Force, formed to track down the "Green River killer". In 1984, he and fellow King County homicide detective Robert Keppel met with incarcerated serial killer Ted Bundy to form a psychological profile of the Green River killer. In 2001, DNA evidence identified Gary Leon Ridgway as the Green River killer. In 2004, Reichert published the memoir Chasing the Devil: My Twenty-Year Quest to Capture the Green River Killer.

In 1971, during his second year in law enforcement, Reichert responded to a domestic violence call in which a knife-wielding man was attempting to kill his wife. The man attacked Reichert and slit his throat, which required stitches and surgery. In an interview, Reichert said of the incident, "I was able to save [the wife], and we got into a scuffle and fell over a coffee table in the living room, and he slit my throat with a butcher knife, ending up with forty-five stitches in my neck." He was awarded with one of his two Medals of Valor for his bravery.

In 1997, he was appointed sheriff of King County, Washington, by King County Executive Ron Sims. In 2001, he ran unopposed for a second four-year term.

Reichert served as president of the Washington State Sheriffs Association. He was an executive board member of the Washington Association of Sheriffs and Police Chiefs.

In 2004 Reichert won the 2004 National Sheriffs' Association's Sheriff of the Year award, two valor awards, and the Washington State attorney general's award for courageous action.

== U.S. House of Representatives ==
=== Elections ===
==== 2004 ====
In 2004, Reichert ran for Congress. He bowed out of the Republican primary debate, however, because two other candidates had run ads critical of him.

He defeated his Democratic opponent, KIRO talk show host Dave Ross, in the 2004 election, 52% to 47%. He succeeded retiring Republican Congresswoman Jennifer Dunn.

At the same time, the Democratic presidential nominee, Senator John Kerry won, 51% to 48%, against President George W. Bush in the 8th district. That made Reichert one of just 17 House Republicans elected in a district that also voted for the Democratic candidate for the presidency.

ARMPAC, a political action committee of former House Majority Leader Tom DeLay, donated $20,000 to his election campaign.

==== 2006 ====
He faced Democratic candidate Darcy Burner in November 2006; he was re-elected with 51% of the vote.

==== 2008 ====
In a repeat of the 2006 election matchup, he faced Democratic candidate Darcy Burner. He won the general election with 53% of the vote to Burner's 47%.

==== 2010 ====
He was challenged by Democratic candidate Suzan DelBene.

==== 2012 ====
He was challenged by Democratic candidate Karen Porterfield, and won with almost 60% of the vote.

==== 2014 ====
He was challenged by Democratic candidate Jason Ritchie, and won with 63% of the vote.

==== 2016 ====
He was challenged by Democratic candidate Tony Ventrella, and won with 60% of the vote.

=== Committee assignments ===
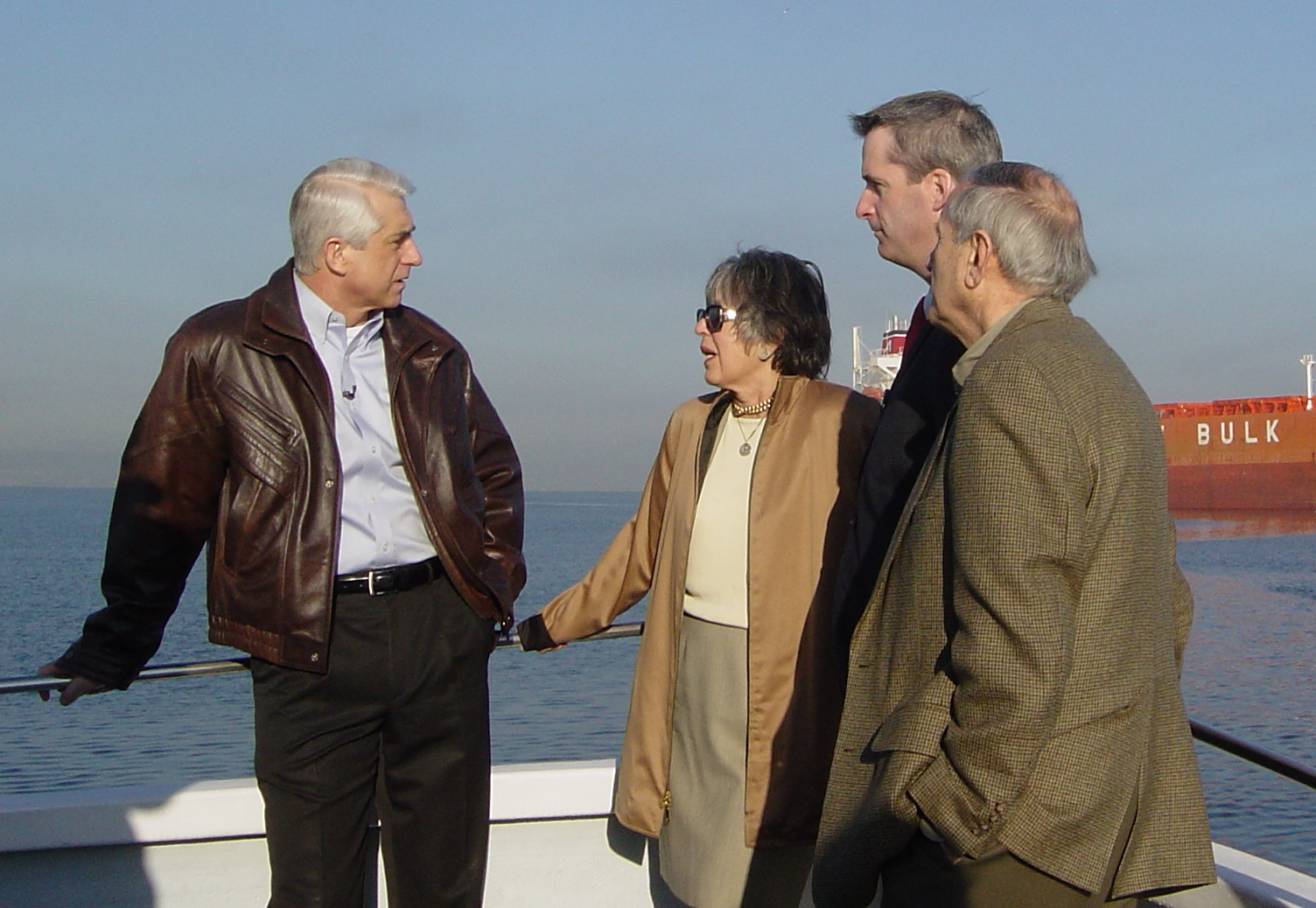
Dave Reichert (left) discusses port security, 2005

- Committee on Ways and Means
  - Subcommittee on Trade
  - Subcommittee on Select Revenue Measures (Chair)

=== Caucus memberships ===
- House Baltic Caucus
- Congressional Arts Caucus
- Congressional NextGen 9-1-1 Caucus
- Climate Solutions Caucus
- U.S.-Japan Caucus

=== Political positions ===
Reichert was a member of the Republican Main Street Partnership. He was ranked as the 21st most bipartisan member of the U.S. House of Representatives during the 114th congress by The Lugar Center and the McCourt School of Public Policy.

==== Abortion ====
Reichert has opposed abortion during his congressional career. He voted repeatedly for bills to restrict abortions after 20 weeks. During the 2024 gubernatorial campaign, Reichert has attempted to soften his prior views on abortion and has said he will uphold current abortion laws if elected.

==== Budget, debt, and spending ====
Reichert was not present for the vote on then-House Budget Committee Chair Paul Ryan's 2012 budget, which Ryan dubbed "The Path to Prosperity"; Reichert had intended to vote in favor of it, but was called away to Washington state following the death of his mother. However, he did vote for the Cut, Cap, and Balance Act and the Budget Control Act of 2011. Both acts required Congress to pass a balanced budget amendment prior to raising the United States debt ceiling. This was supported primarily by Republicans and opposed by Democrats. In the final vote to lift the debt ceiling, until 2013, he voted with the Republican majority in favor.

==== Civil rights ====
Reichert was one of 15 Republican House members to vote in favor of repealing "Don't Ask, Don't Tell", the ban on openly gay military service personnel.

In 2017, Reichert declared his support for Executive Order 13769, which imposed a temporary ban on citizens of seven Muslim-majority countries entering the U.S. He stated that "My first and most important job is protecting families in our region and the American people ... We must be absolutely certain we have systems in place capable of thoroughly vetting anyone applying for refugee status on American soil."

==== Crime ====
Reichert supported reauthorization of the Violence Against Women Act.

He was the main sponsor of the Preventing Sex Trafficking and Improving Opportunities for Youth in Foster Care Act, a bill which would require states to take action to address the problem of sex trafficking of children in the foster care system.

==== Drug reform ====
On March 4, 2014, Reichert introduced the Preserving Welfare for Needs Not Weed Act (H.R. 4137; 113th Congress), a bill that would prevent the use of electronic benefit transfer cards in businesses that sell marijuana.

==== Health care ====
Reichert favored repealing the Affordable Care Act (Obamacare). Reichert was one of only 20 Republicans to vote against the American Health Care Act of 2017 (also known as Trumpcare).

==== LGBT rights ====
Reichert has voiced personal opposition to same-sex marriage, saying in 2024 that "marriage is between a man and a woman". He stated that he doesn't intend to restrict same-sex marriage if elected governor during the 2024 gubernatorial election.

He has also made critical remarks towards transgender people, once responding to a question that asked what defines "a woman" saying that "There’s only man and woman. I was raised with that as a Christian. And marriage is between a man and a woman." Reichert has also said that "I don’t believe that transgender men should be competing against girls and women in sports."

==== Presidential tax returns ====
In February 2017, while serving on the Ways and Means Committee, he voted against a measure that would have led to a request of the Treasury Department for President Donald Trump's tax returns.

==== Taxation ====
Reichert had signed the Taxpayer Protection Pledge by the Americans for Tax Reform, a group run by Grover Norquist. The pledge commits the signer to oppose any legislation that raises taxes or eliminates tax deductions.

On April 10, 2014, Reichert introduced the Permanent S Corporation Built-in Gains Recognition Period Act of 2014 (H.R. 4453; 113th Congress), a bill that would amend the Internal Revenue Code of 1986 to reduce from 10 to 5 years the period during which the built-in gains of an S corporation are subject to tax and to make such reduction permanent.

== Personal life ==
He is married to Julie, whom he met in college. They live in Kent and have three grown children: Angela, Tabitha, and Daniel, and six grandchildren. He is a member of the Lutheran Church–Missouri Synod. He is of German descent.

In 2010, following an injury he sustained from being hit in the head by a tree branch while chopping firewood in his backyard, he developed a subdural hematoma requiring emergency surgery.

== Electoral history ==
Date	Position	Status	Opponent	Result	Vote share	Top-opponent vote share
1997	County sheriff			Appointed		
2001	County sheriff	Incumbent	Ran unopposed	Elected	100%	N/A
2004	U.S. Representative	Open-seat primary	Diane Tebelius (R), Luke Esser (R), Conrad Lee (R)	Nominated	45%	22% (Tebelius)
2004	U.S. Representative	Open-seat	Dave Ross (D)	Elected	52%	47%
2006	U.S. Representative	Incumbent	Darcy Burner (D)	Re-elected	51%	49%
2008	U.S. Representative	Incumbent	Darcy Burner (D)	Re-elected	53%	47%
2010	U.S. Representative	Incumbent	Suzan DelBene (D)	Re-elected	52%	48%
2012	U.S. Representative	Incumbent	Karen Porterfield (D)	Re-elected	60%	40%
2014	U.S. Representative	Incumbent	Jason Ritchie (D)	Re-elected	63%	37%
2016	U.S. Representative	Incumbent	Tony Ventrella (D)	Re-elected	60%	40%
2024	Governor of Washington	Open-seat top-two primary	Bob Ferguson (D), Semi Bird (R), Mark Mullet (D) (Note: This list only includes candidates who received at least 5% of the vote.)	Advanced to the general election	27.48%	44.88% (Ferguson)
2024	Governor of Washington	Open-seat	Bob Ferguson (D)	Lost	44.3%	55.5%

U.S. House of Representatives
Preceded by Jennifer Dunn	Member of the U.S. House of Representatives from Washington's 8th congressional district 2005–2019	Succeeded by Kim Schrier
Party political offices
Preceded by Loren Culp	Republican nominee for Governor of Washington; 2024	Most recent
U.S. order of precedence (ceremonial)
Preceded by Shelley Berkley as Former U.S. Representative	Order of precedence of the United States as Former U.S. Representative	Succeeded by Barbara Cubin as Former U.S. Representative
