= 2016 United States House of Representatives elections in Washington =

- November 8, 2016

All ten Washington seats to the United States House of Representatives
	Majority party	Minority party
Party	Democratic	Republican
Last election	6	4
Seats won	6	4
Seat change	Steady	Steady
Popular vote	1,736,145	1,404,890
Percentage	55.27%	44.73%
Swing	▲3.65%	▼3.65%

Democratic
50–60%
60–70%
70–80%
90–100%
Republican
50–60%
60–70%
70–80%
80–90%
90–100%

The 2016 United States House of Representatives elections in Washington were held on November 8, 2016, to elect the 10 U.S. representatives from the state of Washington, one from each of the state's 10 congressional districts. The elections coincided with the 2016 U.S. presidential election, as well as other elections to the House of Representatives, elections to the United States Senate, and various state and local elections. The primaries were held on August 2.

== District 1 ==
2016 Washington's 1st congressional district election
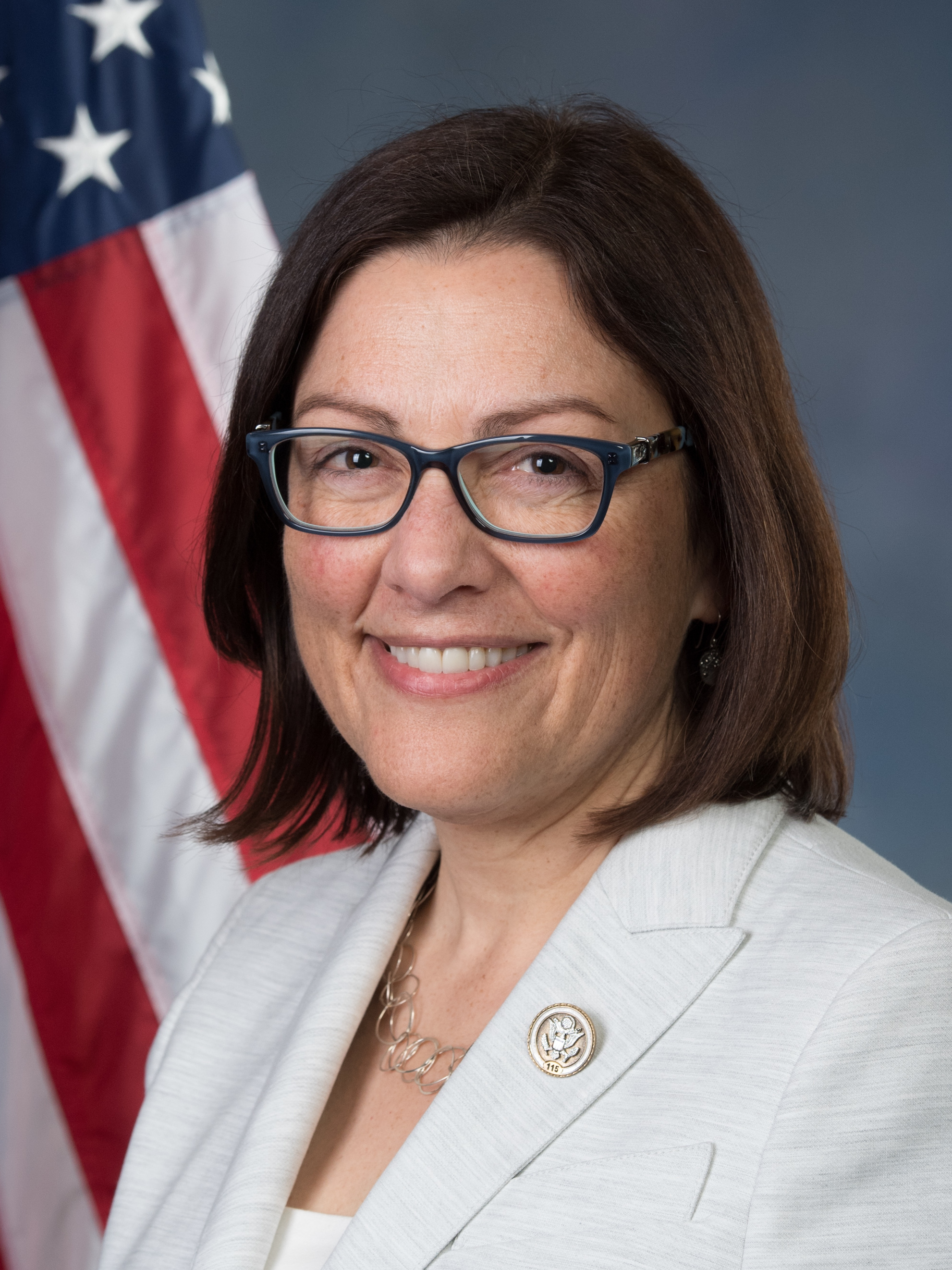

Nominee	Suzan DelBene	Robert Sutherland
Party	Democratic	Republican
Popular vote	193,619	155,779
Percentage	55.4%	44.6%
- DelBene: 50–60% 60–70% 70–80% 80–90% >90% Sutherland: 50–60% 60–70% 70–80% 80–90% >90% Tie: 50% No data
U.S. Representative before election
Suzan DelBene
Democratic
Elected U.S. Representative
Suzan DelBene
Democratic

Incumbent Democrat Suzan DelBene, who had represented the district since 2012, ran for re-election. She was re-elected with 55% of the vote in 2014. The district had a PVI of D+4. The district stretches along the Puget Sound from the Canada–US border to King County.

=== Primary election ===
Elizabeth Scott began a campaign as a Republican, but she later suspended her campaign for health reasons.

==== Democratic candidates ====
===== Advanced to general =====
- Suzan DelBene, incumbent U.S. representative

==== Republican candidates ====
===== Advanced to general =====
- Robert Sutherland, biochemist and candidate for this seat in 2014

===== Eliminated in primary =====
- John Orlinski, social worker, candidate for the 9th District in 2012 and candidate for this seat in 2014

===== Withdrawn =====
- Elizabeth Scott, state representative

==== Libertarian candidates ====
===== Eliminated in primary =====
- Scott Stafne, attorney

==== Independent candidates ====
===== Eliminated in primary =====
- Alex Storms

==== Results ====
Results by county DelBene: 40–50% 50–60% 60–70%; Sutherland: 40–50%

Nonpartisan blanket primary results
Party	Candidate	Votes	%
Democratic	Suzan DelBene (incumbent)	77,756	53.5
Republican	Robert J. Sutherland	44,970	31.0
Republican	John Orlinski	13,694	9.4
Libertarian	Scott Stafne	4,601	3.2
Independent	Alex Storms	4,194	2.9
Total votes		145,215	100.0

=== General election ===
==== Predictions ====
Source	Ranking	As of
The Cook Political Report	Safe D	November 7, 2016
Daily Kos Elections	Safe D	November 7, 2016
Rothenberg	Safe D	November 3, 2016
Sabato's Crystal Ball	Safe D	November 7, 2016
RCP	Safe D	October 31, 2016

==== Results ====
Washington's 1st congressional district, 2016
Party	Candidate	Votes	%
Democratic	Suzan DelBene (incumbent)	193,619	55.4
Republican	Robert J. Sutherland	155,779	44.6
Total votes		349,398	100.0
Democratic hold			

==== By county ====
County results
County	Suzan DelBene Democratic		Robert J. Sutherland Republican		Margin		Total votes
County	#	%	#	%	#	%	Total votes
King (part)	90,514	64.37%	50,098	35.63%	40,416	28.74%	140,612
Skagit (part)	11,119	52.62%	10,011	47.38%	1,108	5.24%	21,130
Snohomish (part)	67,546	51.24%	64,275	48.76%	3,271	2.48%	131,821
Whatcom (part)	24,440	43.77%	31,395	56.23%	-6,955	-12.46%	55,835
Totals	193,619	55.42%	155,779	44.58%	37,840	10.83%	349,398

== District 2 ==
2016 Washington's 2nd congressional district election
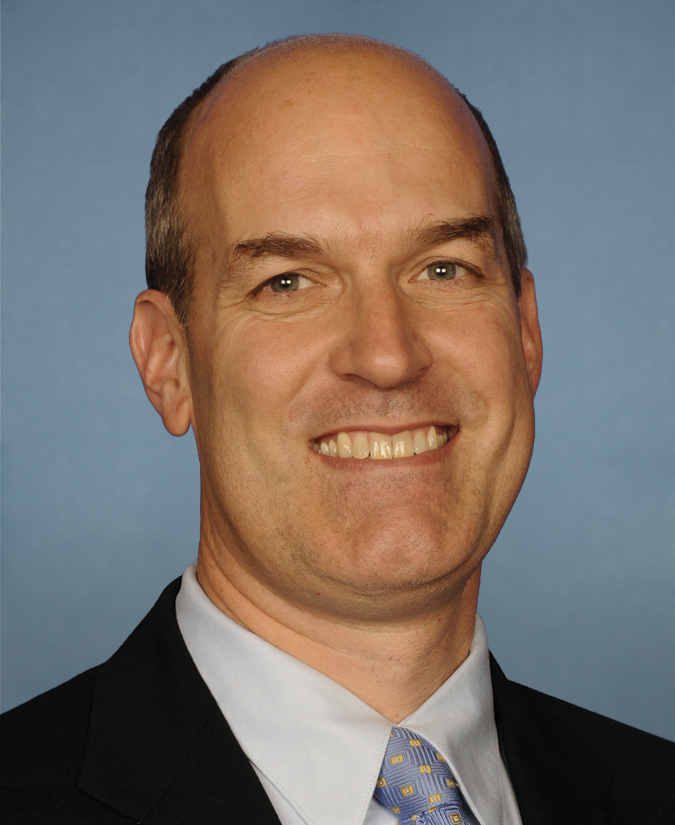

Nominee	Rick Larsen	Marc Hennemann
Party	Democratic	Republican
Popular vote	208,314	117,094
Percentage	64.0%	36.0%
- Larsen: 50–60% 60–70% 70–80% 80–90% >90% Hennemann: 50–60% 60–70% >90% Tie: 50% No data
U.S. Representative before election
Rick Larsen
Democratic
Elected U.S. Representative
Rick Larsen
Democratic

Incumbent Democrat Rick Larsen, who had represented the district since 2001, ran for re-election. He was re-elected with 61% of the vote in 2014. The district had a PVI of D+8.

=== Primary election ===
==== Democratic candidates ====
===== Advanced to general =====
- Rick Larsen, incumbent U.S. representative

===== Eliminated in primary =====
- Mike Lapointe, former labor union organizer and Independent candidate for this seat in 2012 & 2014

==== Republican candidates ====
===== Advanced to general =====
- Marc Hennemann, Air Force veteran and high school social studies teacher

==== Libertarian candidates ====
===== Eliminated in primary =====
- Brian Luke

==== Independent candidates ====
===== Eliminated in primary =====
- Kari Ilonummi

==== Results ====
Results by county Larsen: 40–50% 50–60%

Nonpartisan blanket primary results
Party	Candidate	Votes	%
Democratic	Rick Larsen (incumbent)	71,955	51.8
Republican	Marc Hennemann	44,822	32.3
Democratic	Mike Lapointe	14,697	10.6
Libertarian	Brian Luke	4,771	3.4
No party preference	Kari Ilonummi	2,628	1.9
Total votes		138,873	100.0

=== General election ===
==== Endorsements ====
Marc Hennemann (R)

Statewide officials

- Sam Reed, former secretary of state of Washington

State legislators

- Mark Harmsworth, state representative
- Dave Hayes, state representative
- John Koster, former state representative
- Norma Smith, state representative

Local officials

- Bill Bryant, member of the Seattle Port Commission and general election candidate for governor in 2016

==== Predictions ====
Source	Ranking	As of
The Cook Political Report	Safe D	November 7, 2016
Daily Kos Elections	Safe D	November 7, 2016
Rothenberg	Safe D	November 3, 2016
Sabato's Crystal Ball	Safe D	November 7, 2016
RCP	Safe D	October 31, 2016

==== Results ====
Washington's 2nd congressional district, 2016
Party	Candidate	Votes	%
Democratic	Rick Larsen (incumbent)	208,314	64.0
Republican	Marc Hennemann	117,094	36.0
Total votes		325,408	100.0
Democratic hold			

==== By county ====
County results
County	Rick Larsen Democratic		Marc Hennemann Republican		Margin		Total votes
County	#	%	#	%	#	%	Total votes
Island	24,864	58.14%	17,901	41.86%	6,963	16.28%	42,765
San Juan	7,769	72.51%	2,946	27.49%	4,823	45.01%	10,715
Skagit (part)	19,743	56.69%	15,084	43.31%	4,659	13.38%	34,827
Snohomish (part)	114,975	62.66%	68,508	37.34%	46,467	25.32%	183,483
Whatcom (part)	40,963	76.40%	12,655	23.60%	28,308	52.80%	53,618
Totals	208,314	64.02%	117,094	35.98%	91,220	28.03%	325,408

== District 3 ==
2016 Washington's 3rd congressional district election
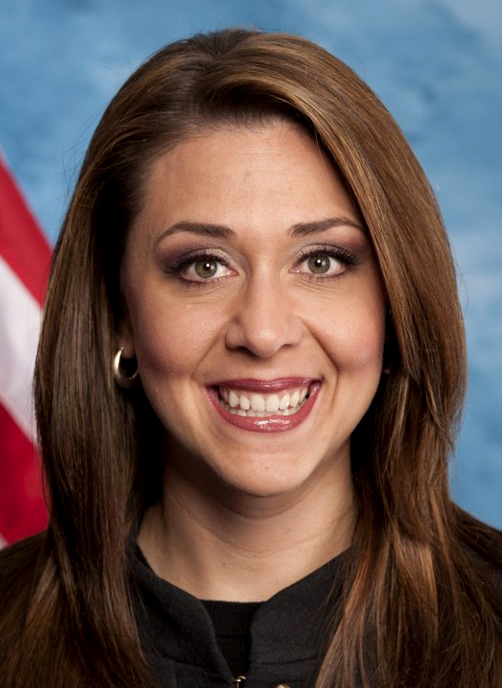

Nominee	Jaime Herrera Beutler	Jim Moeller
Party	Republican	Democratic
Popular vote	193,457	119,820
Percentage	61.7%	38.3%
- Beutler: 50–60% 60–70% 70–80% 80–90% >90% Moeller: 50–60% 60–70% 70–80% 80–90% >90% Tie: 50% No data
U.S. Representative before election
Jaime Herrera Beutler
Republican
Elected U.S. Representative
Jaime Herrera Beutler
Republican

Incumbent Republican Jaime Herrera Beutler, who had represented the district since 2011, ran for re-election. She was re-elected with 62% of the vote in 2014. The district had a PVI of R+2. The district encompasses the southwestern portion of the state.

=== Primary election ===
==== Republican candidates ====
===== Advanced to general =====
- Jaime Herrera Beutler, incumbent U.S. representative

==== Democratic candidates ====
===== Advanced to general =====
- Jim Moeller, state representative

===== Eliminated in primary =====
- Kathleen Arthur, nurse
- Angela Marx
- David McDevitt, attorney

==== Independent candidates ====
===== Eliminated in primary =====
- L.A. Worthington

==== Results ====
Results by county Herrera Beutler: 50–60% 60–70% 70–80%

Nonpartisan blanket primary results
Party	Candidate	Votes	%
Republican	Jaime Herrera Beutler (incumbent)	70,142	55.5
Democratic	Jim Moeller	30,848	24.4
Democratic	David McDevitt	12,896	10.2
Democratic	Angela Marx	4,851	3.8
Democratic	Kathleen Arthur	4,296	3.4
No party preference	L.A. Worthington	3,402	2.7
Total votes		126,435	100.0

=== General election ===
==== Predictions ====
Source	Ranking	As of
The Cook Political Report	Safe R	November 7, 2016
Daily Kos Elections	Safe R	November 7, 2016
Rothenberg	Safe R	November 3, 2016
Sabato's Crystal Ball	Safe R	November 7, 2016
RCP	Likely R	October 31, 2016

==== Results ====
Washington's 3rd congressional district, 2016
Party	Candidate	Votes	%
Republican	Jaime Herrera Beutler (incumbent)	193,457	61.7
Democratic	Jim Moeller	119,820	38.3
Total votes		313,277	100.0
Republican hold			

==== By county ====
County results
County	Jaime Herrera Beutler Republican		Jim Moeller Democratic		Margin		Total votes
County	#	%	#	%	#	%	Total votes
Clark	117,923	59.17%	81,385	40.83%	36,538	18.33%	199,308
Cowlitz	28,932	63.59%	16,568	36.41%	12,364	27.17%	45,500
Klickitat	6,678	63.18%	3,891	36.82%	2,787	26.37%	10,569
Lewis	25,095	73.99%	8,824	26.01%	16,271	47.97%	33,919
Pacific	6,280	59.30%	4,310	40.70%	1,970	18.60%	10,590
Skamania	3,507	62.89%	2,069	37.11%	1,438	25.79%	5,576
Thurston (part)	3,520	64.20%	1,963	35.80%	1,557	28.40%	5,483
Wahkiakum	1,522	65.27%	810	34.73%	712	30.53%	2,332
Totals	193,457	61.75%	119,820	38.25%	73,637	23.51%	313,277

== District 4 ==
2016 Washington's 4th congressional district election
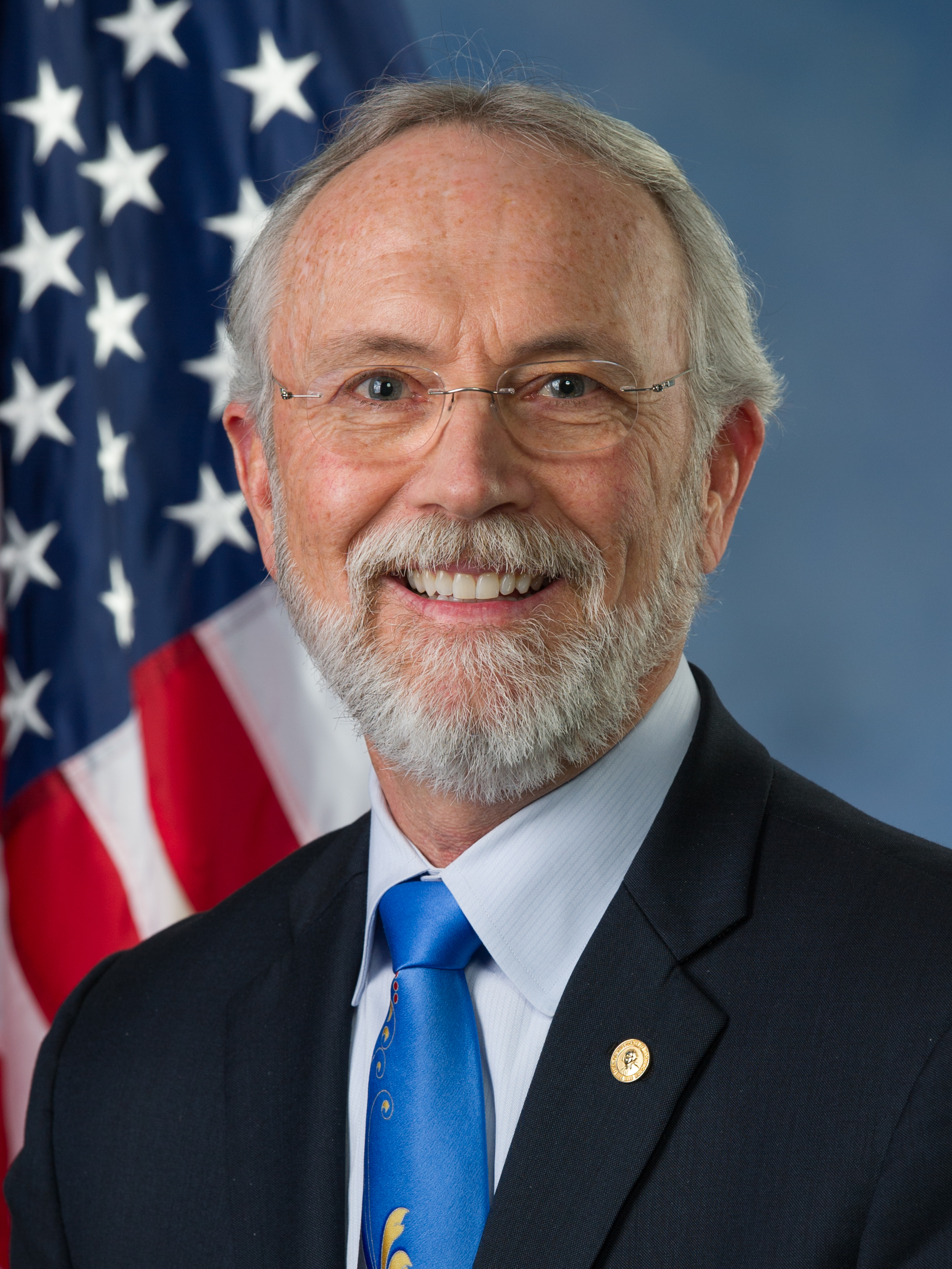

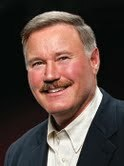
Nominee	Dan Newhouse	Clint Didier
Party	Republican	Republican
Popular vote	132,517	97,402
Percentage	57.6%	42.4%
- Newhouse: 50–60% 60–70% 70–80% 80–90% >90% Didier: 50–60% 60–70% 70–80% 80–90% >90% Tie: 50% No data
U.S. Representative before election
Dan Newhouse
Republican
Elected U.S. Representative
Dan Newhouse
Republican

Incumbent Republican Dan Newhouse, who had represented the district since 2015, ran for re-election. He was elected with 51% of the vote in 2014. The district had a PVI of R+13.

=== Primary election ===
==== Republican candidates ====
===== Advanced to general =====
- Clint Didier, former NFL player, candidate for the U.S. Senate in 2010 and nominee for Washington commissioner of public lands in 2012 and general election candidate for this seat in 2014
- Dan Newhouse, incumbent U.S. representative

===== Eliminated in primary =====
- Glenn Jakeman

==== Democratic candidates ====
===== Eliminated in primary =====
- John Malan
- Doug McKinley

==== Results ====
Results by county Newhouse: 30–40% 40–50% 50–60%

Nonpartisan blanket primary results
Party	Candidate	Votes	%
Republican	Dan Newhouse (incumbent)	44,720	45.8
Republican	Clint Didier	26,892	27.5
Democratic	Doug McKinley	21,678	22.2
Democratic	John Malan	2,320	2.4
Republican	Glenn M. Jakeman	2,090	2.1
Total votes		97,700	100.0

=== General election ===
==== Predictions ====
Source	Ranking	As of
The Cook Political Report	Safe R	November 7, 2016
Daily Kos Elections	Safe R	November 7, 2016
Rothenberg	Safe R	November 3, 2016
Sabato's Crystal Ball	Safe R	November 7, 2016
RCP	Safe R	October 31, 2016

==== Results ====
Washington's 4th congressional district, 2016
Party	Candidate	Votes	%
Republican	Dan Newhouse (incumbent)	132,517	57.6
Republican	Clint Didier	97,402	42.4
Total votes		229,919	100.0
Republican hold			

==== By county ====
County results
County	Dan Newhouse Republican		Clint Didier Republican		Margin		Total votes
County	#	%	#	%	#	%	Total votes
Adams	2,402	55.45%	1,930	44.55%	472	10.90%	4,332
Benton	41,782	53.67%	36,064	46.33%	5,718	7.35%	77,846
Douglas (part)	5,105	63.80%	2,896	36.20%	2,209	27.61%	8,001
Franklin	11,147	49.58%	11,337	50.42%	-190	-0.85%	22,484
Grant	15,645	58.39%	11,148	41.61%	4,497	16.78%	26,793
Okanogan	10,567	68.67%	4,822	31.33%	5,745	37.33%	15,389
Walla Walla (part)	989	43.98%	1,260	56.02%	-271	-12.05%	2,249
Yakima	44,880	61.63%	27,945	38.37%	16,935	23.25%	72,825
Totals	132,517	57.64%	97,402	42.36%	35,115	15.27%	229,919

== District 5 ==
2016 Washington's 5th congressional district election
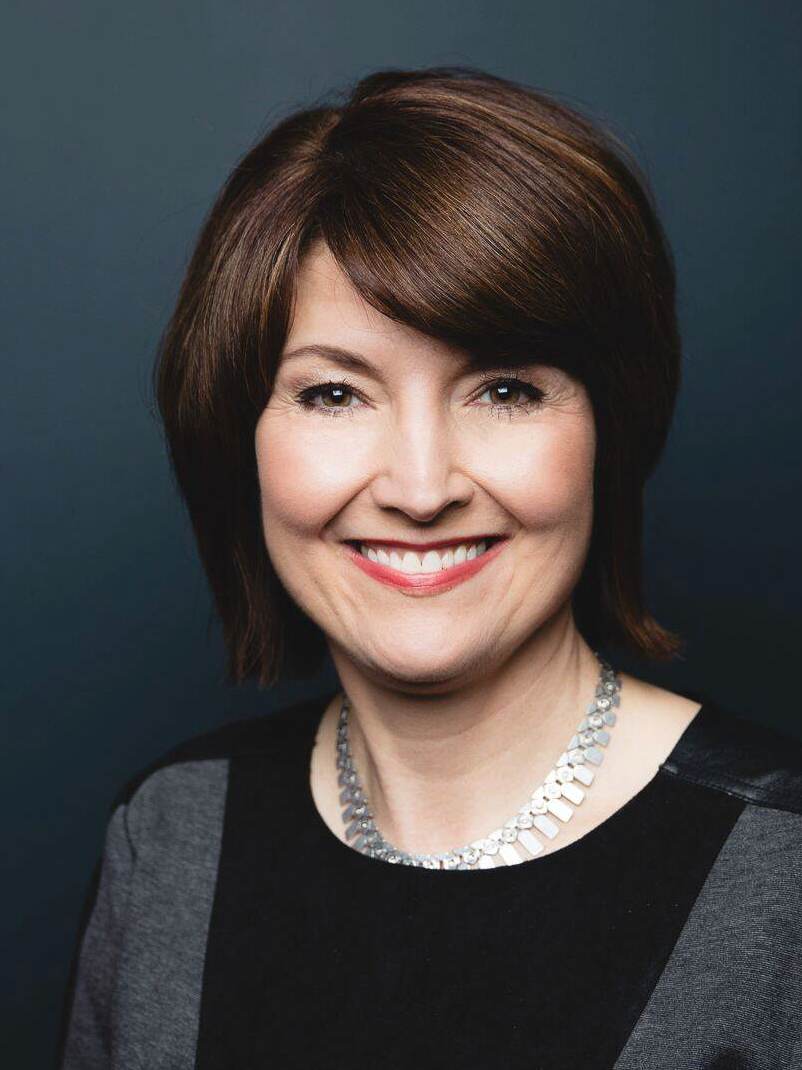

Nominee	Cathy McMorris Rodgers	Joe Pakootas
Party	Republican	Democratic
Popular vote	192,959	130,575
Percentage	59.6%	40.4%
- Rodgers: 50–60% 60–70% 70–80% 80–90% >90% Pakootas: 50–60% 60–70% 70–80% >90% Tie: 50% No data
U.S. Representative before election
Cathy McMorris Rodgers
Republican
Elected U.S. Representative
Cathy McMorris Rodgers
Republican

Incumbent Republican Cathy McMorris Rodgers, who had represented the district since 2005, ran for re-election. She was re-elected with 61% of the vote in 2014. The district had a PVI of R+7, and encompasses the eastern portion of the state.

=== Primary election ===
==== Republican candidates ====
===== Advanced to general =====
- Cathy McMorris Rodgers, incumbent U.S. representative

===== Eliminated in primary =====
- Tom Horne, candidate for this seat in 2014

==== Democratic candidates ====
===== Advanced to general =====
- Joe Pakootas, chief executive officer of the Colville Tribal Federal Corporation and general election candidate for this seat in 2014

===== Withdrawn =====
- David Kay

==== Libertarian candidates ====
===== Eliminated in primary =====
- Krystol McGee

==== Independent candidates ====
===== Eliminated in primary =====
- Dave Wilson

==== Results ====
Results by county McMorris Rodgers: 40–50% 50–60% 60–70%

Nonpartisan blanket primary results
Party	Candidate	Votes	%
Republican	Cathy McMorris Rodgers (incumbent)	60,184	42.2
Democratic	Joe Pakootas	44,999	31.5
Independent	Dave Wilson	18,993	13.3
Republican	Tom Horne	15,830	11.1
Libertarian	Krystol McGee	2,678	1.9
Total votes		142,684	100.0

=== General election ===
==== Debate ====
2016 Washington's 5th congressional district debate
No.	Date	Host	Moderator	Link	Republican	Democratic
Key: P Participant A Absent N Not invited I Invited W Withdrawn						
Key: P Participant A Absent N Not invited I Invited W Withdrawn					Cathy McMorris Rodgers	Joe Pakootas
1	Oct. 6, 2016	KSPS-TV	Kristi Gorenson		P	P

==== Predictions ====
Source	Ranking	As of
The Cook Political Report	Safe R	November 7, 2016
Daily Kos Elections	Safe R	November 7, 2016
Rothenberg	Safe R	November 3, 2016
Sabato's Crystal Ball	Safe R	November 7, 2016
RCP	Safe R	October 31, 2016

==== Results ====
Washington's 5th congressional district, 2016
Party	Candidate	Votes	%
Republican	Cathy McMorris Rodgers (incumbent)	192,959	59.6
Democratic	Joe Pakootas	130,575	40.4
Total votes		323,534	100.0
Republican hold			

==== By county ====
County results
County	Cathy McMorris Rodgers Republican		Joe Pakootas Democratic		Margin		Total votes
County	#	%	#	%	#	%	Total votes
Asotin	6,303	64.66%	3,445	35.34%	2,858	29.32%	9,748
Columbia	1,638	74.66%	556	25.34%	1,082	49.32%	2,194
Ferry	2,217	61.02%	1,416	38.98%	801	22.05%	3,633
Garfield	973	76.74%	295	23.26%	678	53.47%	1,268
Lincoln	4,261	74.01%	1,496	25.99%	2,765	48.03%	5,757
Pend Oreille	4,405	64.27%	2,449	35.73%	1,956	28.54%	6,854
Spokane	133,752	58.04%	96,695	41.96%	37,057	16.08%	230,447
Stevens	15,562	67.75%	7,409	32.25%	8,153	35.49%	22,971
Walla Walla (part)	14,536	62.74%	8,633	37.26%	5,903	25.48%	23,169
Whitman	9,312	53.23%	8,181	46.77%	1,131	6.47%	17,493
Totals	192,959	59.64%	130,575	40.36%	62,384	19.28%	323,534

== District 6 ==
2016 Washington's 6th congressional district election
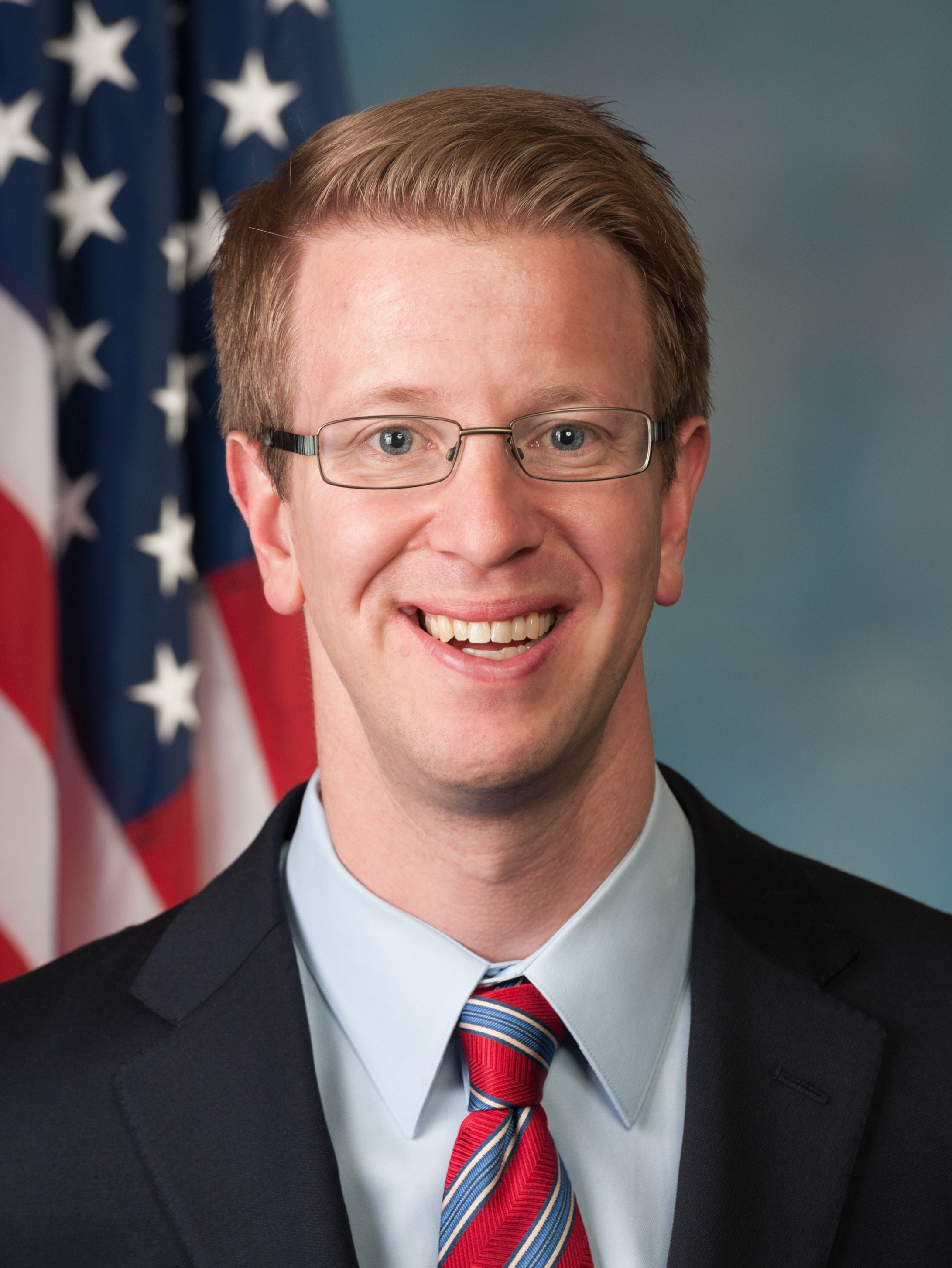

Nominee	Derek Kilmer	Todd Bloom
Party	Democratic	Republican
Popular vote	201,718	126,116
Percentage	61.5%	38.5%
- Kilmer: 50–60% 60–70% 70–80% 80–90% >90% Bloom: 50–60% 60–70% Tie: 50% No data
U.S. Representative before election
Derek Kilmer
Democratic
Elected U.S. Representative
Derek Kilmer
Democratic

Incumbent Democrat Derek Kilmer, who had represented the district since 2013, ran for re-election. He was re-elected with 63% of the vote in 2014. The district had a PVI of D+5, and encompasses the Olympic Peninsula and surrounding areas, as well as most of Tacoma.

=== Primary election ===
==== Democratic candidates ====
===== Advanced to general =====
- Derek Kilmer, incumbent U.S. representative

===== Eliminated in primary =====
- Paul Nuchims

==== Republican candidates ====
===== Advanced to general =====
- Todd Bloom, certified public accountant and attorney

===== Eliminated in primary =====
- Stephan Andrew Brodhead, small business owner and candidate for this seat in 2012

==== Green candidates ====
===== Eliminated in primary =====
- Tyler Myles Vega

==== Independent candidates ====
===== Eliminated in primary =====
- Mike Coverdale

==== Results ====
Results by county Kilmer: 40–50% 50–60% 60–70%

Nonpartisan blanket primary results
Party	Candidate	Votes	%
Democratic	Derek Kilmer (incumbent)	87,311	58.4
Republican	Todd A. Bloom	36,659	24.5
Republican	Stephan Andrew Brodhead	12,269	8.2
Independent	Mike Coverdale	7,223	4.8
Democratic	Paul L. Nuchims	3,318	2.2
Green	Tyler Myles Vega	2,803	1.9
Total votes		149,583	100.0

=== General election ===
==== Predictions ====
Source	Ranking	As of
The Cook Political Report	Safe D	November 7, 2016
Daily Kos Elections	Safe D	November 7, 2016
Rothenberg	Safe D	November 3, 2016
Sabato's Crystal Ball	Safe D	November 7, 2016
RCP	Safe D	October 31, 2016

==== Results ====
Washington's 6th congressional district, 2016
Party	Candidate	Votes	%
Democratic	Derek Kilmer (incumbent)	201,718	61.5
Republican	Todd A. Bloom	126,116	38.5
Total votes		327,834	100.0
Democratic hold			

==== By county ====
County results
County	Derek Kilmer Democratic		Todd A. Bloom Republican		Margin		Total votes
County	#	%	#	%	#	%	Total votes
Clallam	21,557	55.57%	17,236	44.43%	4,321	11.14%	38,793
Grays Harbor	16,025	56.55%	12,315	43.45%	3,710	13.09%	28,340
Jefferson	14,110	70.26%	5,972	29.74%	8,138	40.52%	20,082
Kitsap	74,099	60.94%	47,489	39.06%	26,610	21.89%	121,588
Mason (part)	11,189	52.25%	10,224	47.75%	965	4.51%	21,413
Pierce (part)	64,738	66.32%	32,880	33.68%	31,858	32.64%	97,618
Totals	201,718	61.53%	126,116	38.47%	75,602	23.06%	327,834

== District 7 ==
2016 Washington's 7th congressional district election
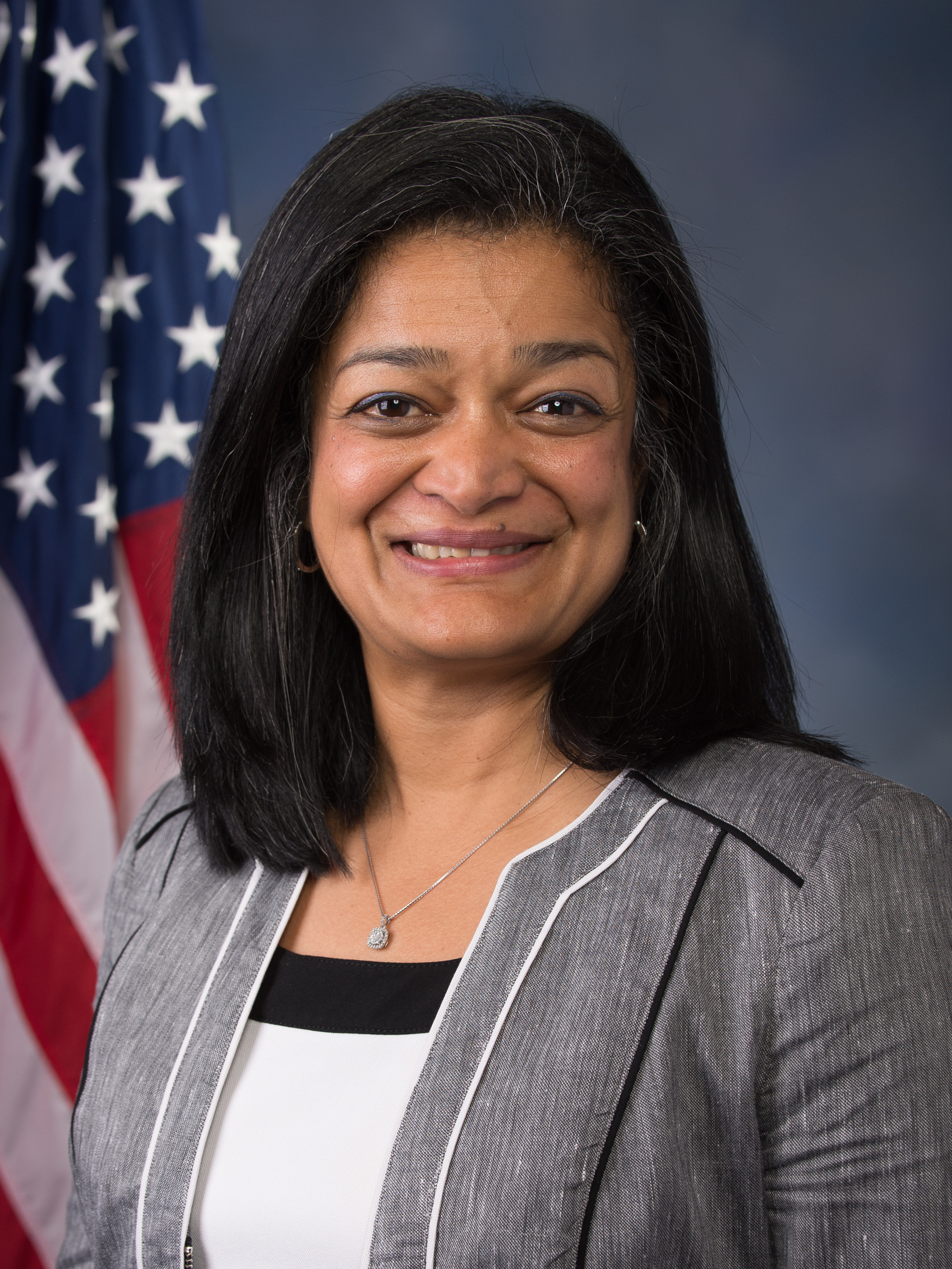

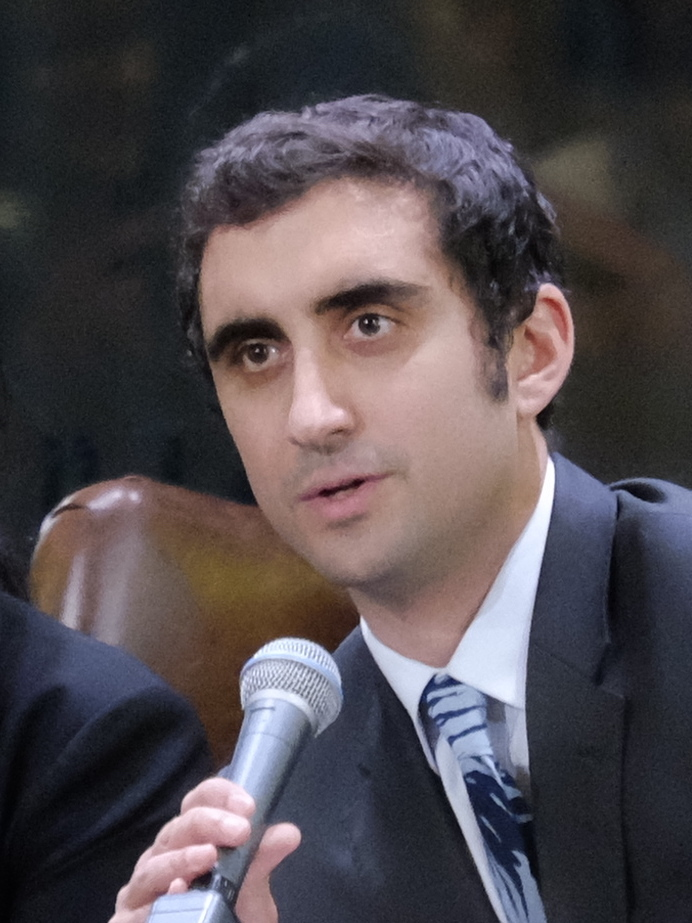
Nominee	Pramila Jayapal	Brady Walkinshaw
Party	Democratic	Democratic
Popular vote	212,010	166,744
Percentage	56.0%	44.0%
- Jayapal: 50–60% 60–70% 70–80% Walkinshaw: 50–60% 60–70% 70–80% Tie: 50% No data
U.S. Representative before election
Jim McDermott
Democratic
Elected U.S. Representative
Pramila Jayapal
Democratic

Incumbent Democrat Jim McDermott, who had represented the district since 1989, announced on January 4, 2016, that he would not seek re-election. He was re-elected with 81% of the vote in 2014. The district had a PVI of D+29.

=== Primary election ===
An anonymous post to Reddit in October 2015 claimed that McDermott was planning on retiring and endorsing current Seattle Mayor Ed Murray to succeed him. Murray and McDermott both denied the rumor.

==== Democratic candidates ====
===== Advanced to general =====
- Pramila Jayapal, state senator
- Brady Walkinshaw, state representative

===== Eliminated in primary =====
- Arun Jhaveri, former mayor of Burien, Washington
- Joe McDermott, King County Council chair
- Don Rivers

===== Declined =====
- Ed Murray, mayor of Seattle

==== Republican candidates ====
===== Eliminated in primary =====
- Craig Keller
- Scott Sutherland

==== Independent candidates ====
===== Eliminated in primary =====
- Carl Cooper
- Leslie Regier

==== Endorsements ====
Pramila Jayapal

U.S. executive branch officials

- Gary Locke, U.S. ambassador to China, former United States secretary of commerce and former governor of Washington

U.S. senators

- Bernie Sanders, U.S. senator (I-VT)

U.S. representatives

- Donna Edwards, U.S. representative from Maryland's 4th congressional district (2008–present)
- Keith Ellison, U.S. representative from Minnesota's 5th congressional district (2007–present)
- Raul Grijalva, U.S. representative from Arizona's 3rd congressional district (2003–present)
- Luis Gutiérrez, U.S. representative from Illinois's 4th congressional district (1993–present)

State legislators

- Wendy Davis, former Texas state senator and candidate in the 2014 Texas gubernatorial election

Local officials

- Lisa Herbold, Seattle City Council member
- Greg Nickels, former mayor of Seattle

Organizations

- Democracy for America
- EMILY's List
- NARAL Pro-Choice America

Individuals

- Gloria Steinem, feminist, journalist, and social and political activist
Joe McDermott

Local officials

- Amy Walen, mayor of Kirkland
- Rob Johnson, Seattle City Council member
- Dave Kaplan, mayor of Des Moines
- John Marchione, mayor of Redmond
Brady Walkinshaw

U.S. representatives

- Barney Frank, U.S. representative from Massachusetts's 4th congressional district (1981–2013)
- Jared Polis, U.S. representative from Colorado's 2nd congressional district (2009–present)

Statewide officials

- James McIntire, State Treasurer

State legislators

- Jessyn Farrell, state representative

Organizations

- Latino Victory Fund
- LGBTQ Victory Fund

Local officials

- Sally Bagshaw, Seattle City Council member
- Tim Burgess, Seattle City Council member
- Lorena González, Seattle City Council member
- Debora Juarez, Seattle City Council member

==== Results ====
Results by county Jayapal: 20–30% 40–50%

Nonpartisan blanket primary results
Party	Candidate	Votes	%
Democratic	Pramila Jayapal	82,753	42.1
Democratic	Brady Walkinshaw	41,773	21.3
Democratic	Joe McDermott	37,495	19.1
Republican	Craig Keller	16,058	8.2
Republican	Scott Sutherland	9,008	4.6
Democratic	Arun Jhaveri	3,389	1.7
No party preference	Leslie Regier	2,592	1.3
Democratic	Don Rivers	2,379	1.2
No party preference	Carl Cooper	1,056	0.5
Total votes		196,503	100.0

=== General election ===
==== Debates ====
2016 Washington's 7th congressional district debate
No.	Date	Host	Moderator	Link	Democratic	Democratic
Key: P Participant A Absent N Not invited I Invited W Withdrawn						
Key: P Participant A Absent N Not invited I Invited W Withdrawn					Pramila Jayapal	Brady Walkinshaw
1	Sep. 16, 2016	City Inside/Out	Brian Callahan		P	P

==== Polling ====
Poll source	Date(s) administered	Sample size	Margin of error	Pramila Jayapal (D)	Brady Walkinshaw (D)	Undecided
Gerstein Bocian Agne Strategies (Note: Poll sponsored by Jayapal's campaign)	August 28, 2016	500 (LV)	–	43%	29%	28%

==== Predictions ====
Source	Ranking	As of
The Cook Political Report	Safe D	November 7, 2016
Daily Kos Elections	Safe D	November 7, 2016
Rothenberg	Safe D	November 3, 2016
Sabato's Crystal Ball	Safe D	November 7, 2016
RCP	Safe D	October 31, 2016

==== Results ====
Washington's 7th congressional district, 2016
Party	Candidate	Votes	%
Democratic	Pramila Jayapal	212,010	56.0
Democratic	Brady Walkinshaw	166,744	44.0
Total votes		378,754	100.0
Democratic hold			

==== By county ====
County results
County	Pramila Jayapal Democratic		Brady Walkinshaw Democratic		Margin		Total votes
County	#	%	#	%	#	%	Total votes
King (part)	200,272	56.52%	154,095	43.48%	46,177	13.03%	354,367
Snohomish (part)	11,738	48.13%	12,649	51.87%	-911	-3.74%	24,387
Totals	212,010	55.98%	166,744	44.02%	45,266	11.95%	378,754

== District 8 ==
2016 Washington's 8th congressional district election
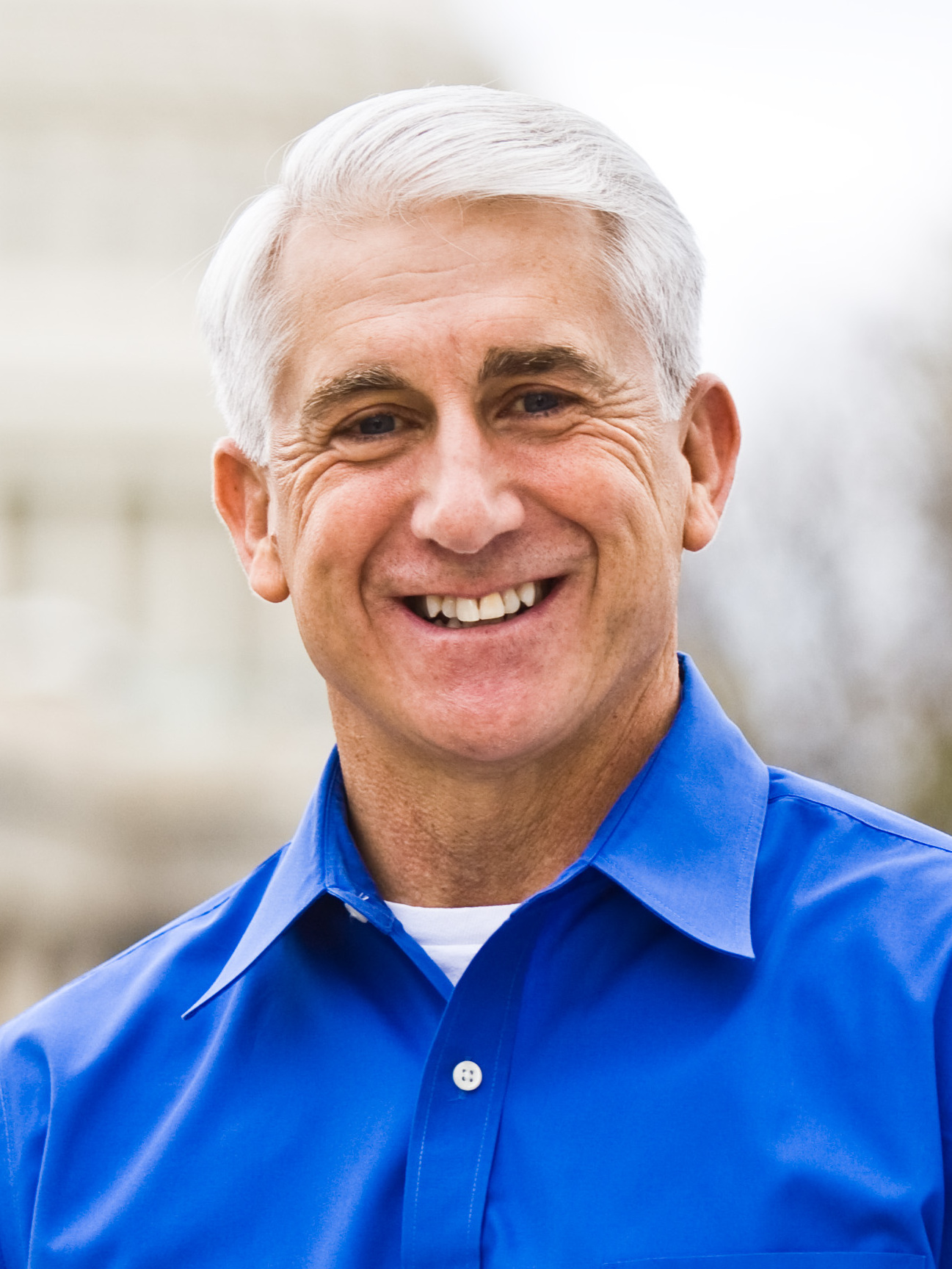

Nominee	Dave Reichert	Tony Ventrella
Party	Republican	Democratic
Popular vote	193,145	127,720
Percentage	60.2%	39.8%
- Reichert: 50–60% 60–70% 70–80% 80–90% >90% Ventrella: 50–60% 60–70% 70–80% Tie: 50% No data
U.S. Representative before election
Dave Reichert
Republican
Elected U.S. Representative
Dave Reichert
Republican

Incumbent Republican Dave Reichert, who had represented the district since 2005, ran for re-election. He was re-elected with 63% of the vote in 2014. The district had a PVI of R+1, and includes the Eastside suburbs of Seattle and portions of the center of the state.

Reichert considered running for governor, but decided instead to run for re-election.

=== Primary election ===
==== Republican candidates ====
===== Advanced to general =====
- Dave Reichert, incumbent U.S. representative

==== Democratic candidates ====
===== Advanced to general =====
- Tony Ventrella, former sportscaster

===== Eliminated in primary =====
- Santiago Ramos, businessman
- Alida Skold, president of a business-consulting firm

===== Declined =====
- Jason Ritchie, businessman and general election candidate for this seat in 2014 (running for state representative)

==== Results ====
Results by county Reichert: 50–60% 60–70% 70–80%

Nonpartisan blanket primary results
Party	Candidate	Votes	%
Republican	Dave Reichert (incumbent)	73,600	56.8
Democratic	Tony Ventrella	22,035	17.0
Democratic	Santiago Ramos	17,900	13.8
Democratic	Alida Skold	10,825	8.4
Independent	Keith Arnold	3,153	2.4
Independent	Margaret M. Walsh	2,024	1.6
Total votes		129,537	100.0

=== General election ===
==== Predictions ====
Source	Ranking	As of
The Cook Political Report	Safe R	November 7, 2016
Daily Kos Elections	Safe R	November 7, 2016
Rothenberg	Safe R	November 3, 2016
Sabato's Crystal Ball	Safe R	November 7, 2016
RCP	Likely R	October 31, 2016

==== Results ====
Washington's 8th congressional district, 2016
Party	Candidate	Votes	%
Republican	Dave Reichert (incumbent)	193,145	60.2
Democratic	Tony Ventrella	127,720	39.8
Total votes		320,865	100.0
Republican hold			

==== By county ====
County results
County	Dave Reichert Republican		Tony Ventrella Democratic		Margin		Total votes
County	#	%	#	%	#	%	Total votes
Chelan	22,411	67.54%	10,771	32.46%	11,640	35.08%	33,182
Douglas (part)	4,732	70.88%	1,944	29.12%	2,788	41.76%	6,676
King (part)	105,885	56.18%	82,602	43.82%	23,283	12.35%	188,487
Kittitas	12,048	64.41%	6,657	35.59%	5,391	28.82%	18,705
Pierce (part)	48,069	65.12%	25,746	34.88%	22,323	30.24%	73,815
Totals	193,145	60.20%	127,720	39.80%	65,425	20.39%	320,865

== District 9 ==
2016 Washington's 9th congressional district election
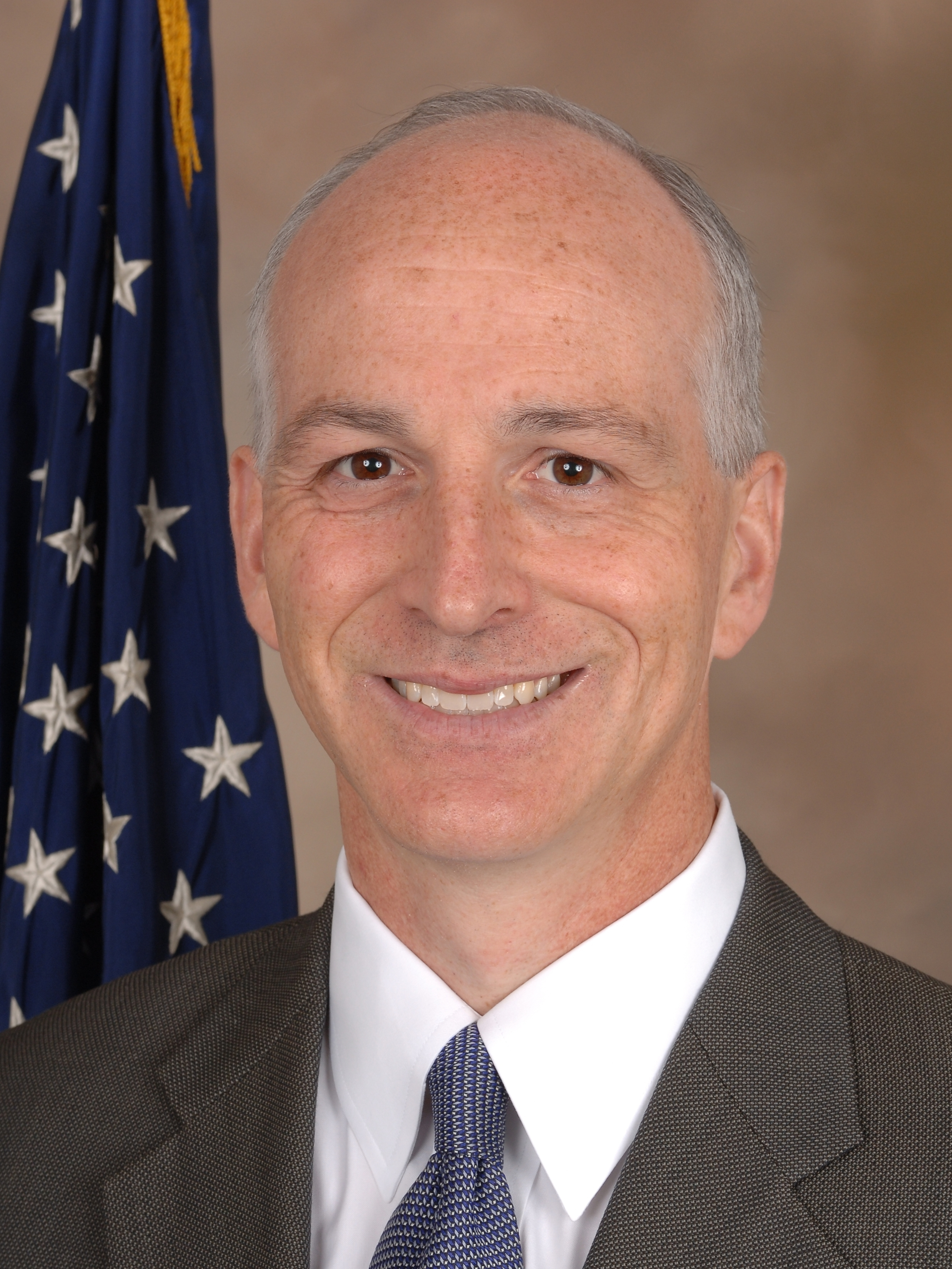

Nominee	Adam Smith	Doug Basler
Party	Democratic	Republican
Popular vote	205,165	76,317
Percentage	72.9%	27.1%
- Smith: 50–60% 60–70% 70–80% 80–90% >90% Basler: 50–60% 60–70% Tie: 50% No data
U.S. Representative before election
Adam Smith
Democratic
Elected U.S. Representative
Adam Smith
Democratic

Incumbent Democrat Adam Smith, who had represented the district since 1997, ran for re-election. He was re-elected with 71% of the vote in 2014. The district had a PVI of D+17.

=== Primary election ===
==== Democratic candidates ====
===== Advanced to general =====
- Adam Smith, incumbent U.S. representative

===== Eliminated in primary =====
- Daniel Smith
- Jesse Wineberry

==== Republican candidates ====
===== Advanced to general =====
- Doug Basler, volunteer youth pastor, corporate trainer and musician

==== Results ====
Results by county Smith: 50–60%

Nonpartisan blanket primary results
Party	Candidate	Votes	%
Democratic	Adam Smith (incumbent)	67,100	56.3
Republican	Doug Basler	27,848	23.4
Democratic	Jesse Wineberry	17,613	14.8
Democratic	Daniel Smith	3,935	3.3
Independent	Jeary Flener	2,733	2.3
Total votes		119,229	100.0

=== General election ===
==== Predictions ====
Source	Ranking	As of
The Cook Political Report	Safe D	November 7, 2016
Daily Kos Elections	Safe D	November 7, 2016
Rothenberg	Safe D	November 3, 2016
Sabato's Crystal Ball	Safe D	November 7, 2016
RCP	Safe D	October 31, 2016

==== Results ====
Washington's 9th congressional district, 2016
Party	Candidate	Votes	%
Democratic	Adam Smith (incumbent)	205,165	72.9
Republican	Doug Basler	76,317	27.1
Total votes		281,482	100.0
Democratic hold			

==== By county ====
County results
County	Adam Smith Democratic		Doug Basler Republican		Margin		Total votes
County	#	%	#	%	#	%	Total votes
King (part)	198,883	73.35%	72,263	26.65%	126,620	46.70%	271,146
Pierce (part)	6,282	60.78%	4,054	39.22%	2,228	21.56%	10,336
Totals	205,165	72.89%	76,317	27.11%	128,848	45.77%	281,482

== District 10 ==
2016 Washington's 10th congressional district election
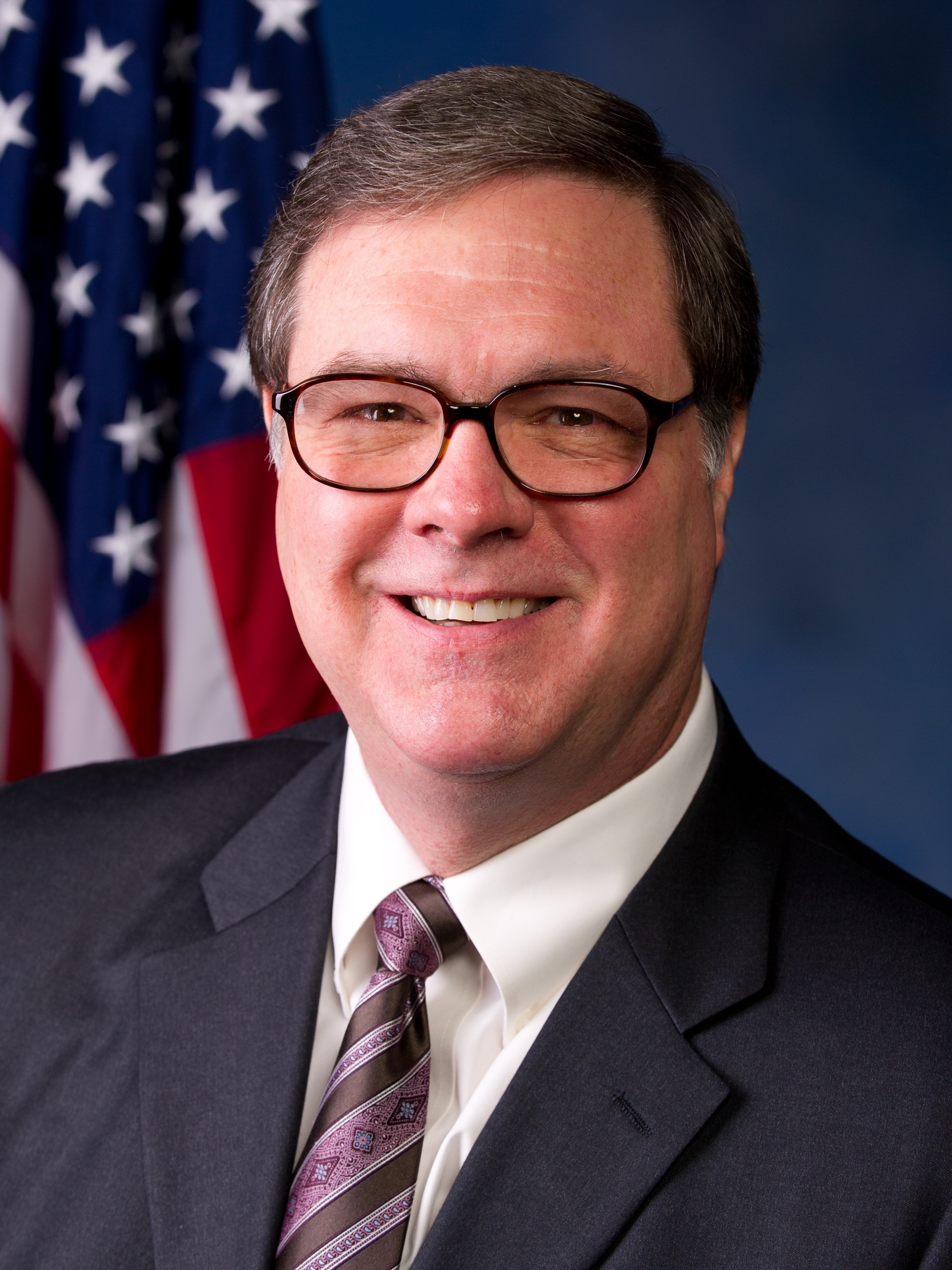

Nominee	Denny Heck	Jim Postma
Party	Democratic	Republican
Popular vote	170,460	120,104
Percentage	58.7%	41.3%
- Heck: 50–60% 60–70% 70–80% 80–90% >90% Postma: 50–60% 60–70% 70–80% >90% Tie: 50% No data
U.S. Representative before election
Denny Heck
Democratic
Elected U.S. Representative
Denny Heck
Democratic

Incumbent Democrat Dennis Heck, who had represented the district since 2013, ran for re-election. He was re-elected with 55% of the vote in 2014. The district had a PVI of D+5, and encompasses the state capital of Olympia and surrounding areas.

=== Primary election ===
==== Democratic candidates ====
===== Advanced to general =====
- Dennis Heck, incumbent U.S. representative

===== Eliminated in primary =====
- Jennifer Ferguson

==== Republican candidates ====
===== Advanced to general =====
- Jim Postma, businessman, general election candidate for 9th district in 2012 and candidate for the 9th district in 2008 and 2010

==== Results ====
Results by county Heck: 40–50% 50–60%; Postma: 40–50%

Nonpartisan blanket primary results
Party	Candidate	Votes	%
Democratic	Dennis Heck (incumbent)	58,865	46.5
Republican	Jim Postma	46,473	36.7
Democratic	Jennifer Gigi Ferguson	16,750	13.2
No party preference	Richard Boyce	4,411	3.5
Total votes		126,499	100.0

=== General election ===
==== Predictions ====
Source	Ranking	As of
The Cook Political Report	Safe D	November 7, 2016
Daily Kos Elections	Safe D	November 7, 2016
Rothenberg	Safe D	November 3, 2016
Sabato's Crystal Ball	Safe D	November 7, 2016
RCP	Safe D	October 31, 2016

==== Results ====
Washington's 10th congressional district, 2016
Party	Candidate	Votes	%
Democratic	Dennis Heck (incumbent)	170,460	58.7
Republican	Jim Postma	120,104	41.3
Total votes		290,564	100.0
Democratic hold			

==== By county ====
County results
County	Denny Heck Democratic		Jim Postma Republican		Margin		Total votes
County	#	%	#	%	#	%	Total votes
Mason (part)	3,749	58.34%	2,677	41.66%	1,072	16.68%	6,426
Pierce (part)	90,107	55.64%	71,828	44.36%	18,279	11.29%	161,935
Thurston (part)	76,604	62.69%	45,599	37.31%	31,005	25.37%	122,203
Totals	170,460	58.67%	120,104	41.33%	50,356	17.33%	290,564

Official campaign websites
- District 1
  - Suzan DelBene for Congress
  - Robert J. Sutherland for Congress
- District 2
  - Rick Larsen for Congress
  - Marc Hennemann for Congress
- District 3
  - Jaime Herrera Beutler for Congress Archived 2021-01-14 at the Wayback Machine
  - Jim Moeller for Congress
- District 4
  - Dan Newhouse for Congress
- District 5
  - Cathy McMorris Rodgers for Congress
  - Joe Pakootas for Congress
- District 6
  - Derek Kilmer for Congress
  - Todd Bloom for Congress
- District 7
  - Pramila Jayapal for Congress
  - Brady Walkinshaw for Congress
- District 8
  - Dave Reichert for Congress Archived 2016-08-26 at the Wayback Machine
  - Tony Ventrella for Congress
- District 9
  - Adam Smith for Congress
  - Doug Basler for Congress
- District 10
  - Dennis Heck for Congress
  - Jim Postma for Congress
