= Peter J. Goldmark =

American rancher, wheat farmer, geneticist, firefighter and politician

15th Washington State Commissioner of Public Lands
- In office January 14, 2009 – January 11, 2017
- Governor: Christine Gregoire; Jay Inslee
- Preceded by: Doug Sutherland
- Succeeded by: Hilary Franz

Personal details
- Born: Peter James Goldmark; August 4, 1946 (age 80) Okanogan, Washington, U.S.
- Party: Democratic
- Spouse(s): Georgia (deceased), remarried to Wendy
- Children: 5
- Parent: John Goldmark
- Education: Haverford College (BA); University of California, Berkeley (PhD)
- Occupation: Rancher and Wheat farmer
- Profession: Molecular Biology
- Website: www.petergoldmark.com

Peter James Goldmark (born August 4, 1946) was the 15th Commissioner of Public Lands of Washington, head of the Washington Department of Natural Resources, from 2009 to 2017. He is a Democrat from a rural part of Okanogan County, Washington, outside of the town of Okanogan.

Goldmark has placed a lifelong emphasis on agriculture, science, education, and public service. His primary career experience includes ranching in Eastern Washington; over thirty years of volunteering to fighting wildland fires; and a PhD in molecular biology. He has published papers in national and international scientific journals on plant molecular genetics and currently runs a wheat breeding program for crop improvement.

In 2008, Goldmark won the election for Commissioner of Public Lands against incumbent Doug Sutherland in a tightly contested race. The major focus points of his campaign for Public Land Commissioner include preventing forest from being converted into strip malls or development; encouraging sustainable timber practices to maintain steady income and areas of recreation for the state; cleaning up Puget Sound; promoting the use of biofuels; effective wildland fire management; and maintaining clean water for drinking, salmon habitat, and shellfish harvesting. He was succeeded by Hilary Franz after the 2016 election, where he did not run.

== Early life ==
Goldmark was born in Okanogan, Washington, the son of Irma "Sally" (née Ringe) and John E. Goldmark, who bought the family property, Double J Ranch, in 1946. His father was of half Austrian Jewish and half British Isles descent, and his mother was from a Protestant family of German ancestry. Peter began his education in a one-room school house at Duley Lake near Okanogan, Washington. He graduated from Okanogan High School in Okanogan in 1963 and Haverford College in 1967. He completed an advanced degree in molecular biology before returning to Double J Ranch.

Goldmark's father, John, had been a Washington State legislator. After a local newspaper, the Tonasket Tribune, smeared him as a Communist and possibly cost him re-election in 1962, John and his wife Sally sued for libel and won, in a landmark case. Goldmark's brother Charles, along with his immediate family, was murdered in Seattle in 1985 by David Lewis Rice, who falsely believed them to be Jewish Communists.

== Education ==
- 1967: Bachelor's degree from Haverford College in Haverford, Pennsylvania
- 1971: Doctor of Philosophy (Ph.D.) in molecular biology from the University of California at Berkeley

== Career ==
Goldmark is the owner of Double J. Ranch, which covers 7,000-acre (28 km^{2}) in Okanogan County. He also is the founder and chief scientist of a biotechnology research laboratory, DJR Research, Inc., in Okanogan. Most recently he served on the Washington State University Board of Regents.

Career awards include being named Washington State Conservation Farmer of the Year (1983). Additional career notes include thirty years as a volunteer wildland firefighter in Washington State. He was also former Director of the Washington Department of Agriculture, resigning in under six months (reports of exact time differs) saying "It is not possible for me to fulfill the requirements of this important and demanding job in state government and still meet the needs of my family." He was recently noted as saying he is ready for a full-time government post as Commissioner of Public Lands, and addressed concerns over the short period of time with the Department of Agriculture, citing that his children are now grown and he has hired additional staff to help manage the ranch.

- 1971–1972: Research associate at Harvard University Medical School
- 1976–1986: Member and chair of the Okanogan County Planning Commission
- 1993: Director of the Washington State Department of Agriculture, appointed by Governor Mike Lowry
- 1994–1996: Chair of the Governor's Council on Agriculture and the Environment
- 1996–2005: Board of Regents of the Washington State University.
- 1996–1998: Vice President of Quality Northwest
- 1997–2005: Served on the board of directors of the Okanogan School District
- 1999–2000: President of the Board and chairman of the presidential search committee
- 1999–present: Co-founded Farming and the Environment, a non-profit to bridge farmers and environmentalists
- 2002–2003: Served on the Governor's Council for a Sustainable Washington
- 2003–2008: Served on the advisory board of the Washington State University – University of Washington Policy Consensus Center
- 2004–2005: Served on the Governor's Council on Biodiversity
- Ongoing: Over 30 years as a wildland firefighter with Okanogan County Fire District No. 8

== 2006 campaign ==
In 2006, Goldmark ran for Congress in Washington's 5th congressional district against Cathy McMorris, who was hailed as a rising star and a heavy favorite for re-election. The increasing visibility and fundraising ability of Goldmark's campaign prompted CQPolitics.com to change its race rating to Republican Favored from Safe Republican in late August, 2006—stating that McMorris was still likely to win re-election, but that Goldmark was providing her with serious competition. McMorris ended up defeating Goldmark (56.4% to 43.6%) by 13% even after the DCCC designed the race as one of their "Red To Blue" races, targeting it for donations and support.

== 2008 campaign ==
Goldmark's 2008 campaign focus was to "restore the integrity of the management of 15 million acres (61,000 km^{2}) of forest, rangeland, and water resources." He brought ranching and science experience, as well as a conservation ethic, to Washington Department of Natural Resources. He hoped to maximize the productivity and sustainability of jobs, recreation, and wildlife. He beat incumbent commissioner Doug Sutherland by 31,000 votes.

== Political positions ==
=== Energy policy ===
Goldmark is campaigning for a reduction in dependence on foreign oil by supporting the use of fuels derived from biomass, like biodiesel and raising the mileage requirements for new cars and trucks. He also supports decentralized renewable energy initiatives to promote energy self-reliance in rural areas and supports investing in wind energy.

=== Puget Sound and the environment ===
Goldmark places a strong emphasis on the conservation of the Puget Sound, and the various rivers comprising its basin, for the restoration of salmon and other aquatic species. Clean water is important to the Washington Department of Natural Resources because a portion of their budget is based on the harvesting of wild geoduck.

Goldmark is a board member of the Washington State Biodiversity Council. Former Governor Gary Locke created the Council in 2004 to develop and promote more effective ways of conserving Washington's biodiversity.

=== Farming ===
Goldmark ranches with a strong conservation philosophy. He adheres to methods that would conserve the soil while growing crops and managing the whole ranch with a philosophy of care instead of one of exploitation. In 1999, Goldmark co-founded a nonprofit called Farming and the Environment comprising a coalition of environmentalists and farmers. The group is dedicated to ensuring the ecological and economic health of agricultural lands and rural communities. The hope is to build a bridge between farmers and environmentalists. The group has worked together to meet the needs of a healthy environment and maintain economically viable agricultural opportunities at the same time. Goldmark says that farmers and ranchers fulfill a mandate to provide food for people and at the same time, they seek to be good stewards of the land and have to be very much concerned with the environment.

=== Forest management ===
Goldmark is concerned over the loss of working forests to sprawl and unsustainable logging practices. He wants to "end sweetheart deals that give away public resources" and is working to limit clearcutting on dangerous slopes.

=== Campaign finance and government ethics ===
Peter Goldmark takes a very strong stance against lobbyist gifts and meals given to elected officials. He has vowed to refuse all such gifts and has challenged his opponent to take the same position. Goldmark did accept $202,855 in PAC money during the 2006 election cycle.

== Electoral history ==
=== 2006 ===
Washington 5th Congressional District Election, 2006
Party	Candidate	Votes	%
Republican	Cathy McMorris (inc.)	134,967	56.40
Democratic	Peter Goldmark	104,357	43.60

=== 2008 ===
Washington Commissioner of Public Lands Election, 2008
Party	Candidate	Votes	%
Democratic	Peter Goldmark	1,416,904	50.55
Republican	Doug Sutherland	1,385,903	49.45

=== 2012 ===
==== Primary ====
Washington Commissioner of Public Lands Primary Election, 2012
Party	Candidate	Votes	%
Democratic	Peter Goldmark (inc.)	683,448	51.88
Republican	Clint Didier	540,907	41.06
Independent	Stephen Sharon	92,993	7.06

==== General ====
Washington Commissioner of Public Lands Election, 2012
Party	Candidate	Votes	%
Democratic	Peter Goldmark (inc.)	1,692,083	58.74
Republican	Clint Didier	1,188,411	41.26

== See also ==
- Washington Department of Natural Resources
- Geoduck
- Washington State Executive elections, 2008
- Washington United States House elections, 2006
