= 2012 Washington Public Lands Commissioner election =

- November 6, 2012

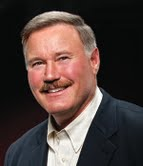
Candidate	Peter J. Goldmark	Clint Didier
Party	Democratic	Republican
Popular vote	1,692,083	1,188,411
Percentage	58.74%	41.26%
- Goldmark: 50–60% 60–70% 70–80% 80–90% Didier: 50–60% 60–70%
Public Lands Commissioner before election
Peter J. Goldmark
Democratic
Elected Public Lands Commissioner
Peter J. Goldmark
Democratic

The 2012 Washington Public Lands Commissioner election was held on November 6, 2012, to elect the Washington Public Lands Commissioner, concurrently with the 2012 U.S. presidential election, as well as elections to the U.S. Senate and various state and local elections, including for U.S. House and governor of Washington.

Incumbent Democratic Public Lands Commissioner Peter J. Goldmark was re-elected to a second term, defeating Republican Clint Didier in a landslide.

== Background ==
Golmark was elected in 2008, defeating then-incumbent public lands commissioner Doug Sutherland. He ran for re-election to a second term in office.

== Candidates ==
Washington is one of two states that holds a top-two primary, meaning that all candidates are listed on the same ballot regardless of party affiliation, and the top two move on to the general election.

=== Democratic Party ===
==== Advanced to general ====
- Peter J. Goldmark, incumbent public lands commissioner (2009–2017)

=== Republican Party ===
==== Advanced to general ====
- Clint Didier, former NFL player and candidate for U.S. Senate in 2010

=== Third-party and independent candidates ===
==== Eliminated in primary ====
- Stephen A. Sharon (Independent)

== Primary election ==
=== Results ===
County results Goldmark: 40–50%; 50–60%; 60–70%; Didier: 40–50%; 50–60%; 60–70%; 70–80%

Congressional district results Goldmark: 40–50%; 50–60%; 60–70%; 70–80%; Didier: 40–50%; 50–60%; 60–70%

Blanket primary election results
Party	Candidate	Votes	%
Democratic	Peter J. Goldmark (incumbent)	683,448	51.88
Republican	Clint Didier	540,907	41.06
Independent	Stephen A. Sharon	92,993	7.06
Total votes		1,317,348	100.00

==== By county ====
County	Peter J. Goldmark Democratic		Clint Didier Republican		Stephen A. Sharon Independent		Margin		Total
County	#	%	#	%	#	%	#	%	Total
Adams	587	22.78%	1,824	70.78%	166	6.44%	-1,237	-48.00%	2,577
Asotin	1,837	39.06%	2,363	50.24%	503	10.70%	-526	-11.18%	4,703
Benton	8,539	27.36%	20,672	66.22%	2,004	6.42%	-12,133	-38.87%	31,215
Chelan	5,759	34.71%	9,425	56.81%	1,406	8.47%	-3,666	-22.10%	16,590
Clallam	8,356	43.96%	9,098	47.87%	1,553	8.17%	-742	-3.90%	19,007
Clark	28,465	43.07%	32,452	49.10%	5,176	7.83%	-3,987	-6.03%	66,093
Columbia	308	27.62%	702	62.96%	105	9.42%	-394	-35.34%	1,115
Cowlitz	8,090	45.07%	7,882	43.91%	1,977	11.01%	208	1.16%	17,949
Douglas	2,423	33.04%	4,362	59.48%	548	7.47%	-1,939	-26.44%	7,333
Ferry	604	34.93%	991	57.32%	134	7.75%	-387	-22.38%	1,729
Franklin	2,387	25.92%	6,285	68.26%	536	5.82%	-3,898	-42.33%	9,208
Garfield	154	26.69%	381	66.03%	42	7.28%	-227	-39.34%	577
Grant	3,413	28.45%	7,609	63.42%	976	8.13%	-4,196	-34.97%	11,998
Grays Harbor	6,652	48.53%	5,342	38.97%	1,714	12.50%	1,310	9.56%	13,708
Island	10,486	46.83%	10,082	45.03%	1,823	8.14%	404	1.80%	22,391
Jefferson	6,786	60.29%	3,560	31.63%	910	8.08%	3,226	28.66%	11,256
King	265,502	66.94%	110,587	27.88%	20,510	5.17%	154,915	39.06%	396,599
Kitsap	29,474	51.66%	22,920	40.17%	4,659	8.17%	6,554	11.49%	57,053
Kittitas	2,888	35.35%	4,597	56.27%	684	8.37%	-1,709	-20.92%	8,169
Klickitat	1,534	38.87%	2,051	51.98%	361	9.15%	-517	-13.10%	3,946
Lewis	4,658	30.56%	8,774	57.56%	1,811	11.88%	-4,116	-27.00%	15,243
Lincoln	892	29.04%	2,001	65.14%	179	5.83%	-1,109	-36.10%	3,072
Mason	6,517	44.73%	6,243	42.85%	1,809	12.42%	274	1.88%	14,569
Okanogan	3,401	39.38%	4,584	53.07%	652	7.55%	-1,183	-13.70%	8,637
Pacific	2,838	47.95%	2,412	40.75%	669	11.30%	426	7.20%	5,919
Pend Oreille	1,239	36.49%	1,793	52.81%	363	10.69%	-554	-16.32%	3,395
Pierce	72,225	51.85%	57,484	41.27%	9,580	6.88%	14,741	10.58%	139,289
San Juan	3,178	60.53%	1,723	32.82%	349	6.65%	1,455	27.71%	5,250
Skagit	11,973	45.40%	12,163	46.12%	2,236	8.48%	-190	-0.72%	26,372
Skamania	922	41.97%	1,077	49.02%	198	9.01%	-155	-7.06%	2,197
Snohomish	67,181	50.48%	55,656	41.82%	10,260	7.71%	11,525	8.66%	133,097
Spokane	42,452	43.56%	48,093	49.35%	6,904	7.08%	-5,641	-5.79%	97,449
Stevens	3,342	31.23%	6,496	60.70%	863	8.06%	-3,154	-29.47%	10,701
Thurston	29,524	53.75%	21,196	38.59%	4,210	7.66%	8,328	15.16%	54,930
Wahkiakum	521	43.45%	561	46.79%	117	9.76%	-40	-3.34%	1,199
Walla Walla	4,090	32.90%	7,314	58.84%	1,026	8.25%	-3,224	-25.94%	12,430
Whatcom	21,504	49.63%	19,352	44.66%	2,473	5.71%	2,152	4.97%	43,329
Whitman	2,963	42.10%	3,540	50.30%	535	7.60%	-577	-8.20%	7,038
Yakima	9,784	32.60%	17,260	57.50%	2,972	9.90%	-7,476	-24.91%	30,016
Totals	683,448	51.88%	540,907	41.06%	92,993	7.06%	142,541	10.82%	1,317,348

Counties that flipped from Republican to Democratic

- Grays Harbor (largest city: Aberdeen)
- Island (largest city: Oak Harbor)
- Kitsap (largest city: Bremerton)
- Mason (largest city: Shelton)
- Pacific (largest city: Raymond)
- Pierce (largest city: Tacoma)
- Thurston (largest city: Lacey)

==== By congressional district ====
District	Goldmark	Didier	Sharon	Representative
1st	49%	45%	6%	Suzan DelBene
2nd	53%	40%	8%	Rick Larsen
3rd	42%	49%	9%	Jaime Herrera Beutler
4th	30%	62%	8%	Doc Hastings
5th	41%	52%	7%	Cathy McMorris Rodgers
6th	52%	39%	8%	Norm Dicks
7th	78%	18%	4%	Jim McDermott
8th	45%	48%	7%	Dave Reichert
9th	65%	29%	6%	Adam Smith
10th	52%	40%	7%	Denny Heck

== General election ==
=== Results ===
2012 Washington Public Lands Commissioner election
Party	Candidate	Votes	%	±%
Democratic	Peter J. Goldmark (incumbent)	1,692,083	58.74%	+8.19%
Republican	Clint Didier	1,188,411	41.26%	–8.19%
Total votes		2,880,494	100.00%	N/A
Democratic hold				

==== By county ====
County results
County	Peter J. Goldmark Democratic		Clint Didier Republican		Margin		Total votes
County	#	%	#	%	#	%	Total votes
Adams	1,552	34.02%	3,010	65.98%	-1,458	-31.96%	4,562
Asotin	4,246	46.07%	4,970	53.93%	-724	-7.86%	9,216
Benton	25,868	34.48%	49,148	65.52%	-23,280	-31.03%	75,016
Chelan	12,946	43.08%	17,107	56.92%	-4,161	-13.85%	30,053
Clallam	18,328	51.63%	17,171	48.37%	1,157	3.26%	35,499
Clark	92,716	52.67%	83,301	47.33%	9,415	5.35%	176,017
Columbia	728	34.10%	1,407	65.90%	-679	-31.80%	2,135
Cowlitz	22,326	54.06%	18,973	45.94%	3,353	8.12%	41,299
Douglas	5,445	38.57%	8,671	61.43%	-3,226	-22.85%	14,116
Ferry	1,424	43.36%	1,860	56.64%	-436	-13.28%	3,284
Franklin	7,753	35.36%	14,172	64.64%	-6,419	-29.28%	21,925
Garfield	433	36.66%	748	63.34%	-315	-26.67%	1,181
Grant	9,241	35.25%	16,974	64.75%	-7,733	-29.50%	26,215
Grays Harbor	15,024	56.12%	11,745	43.88%	3,279	12.25%	26,769
Island	21,006	53.70%	18,110	46.30%	2,896	7.40%	39,116
Jefferson	12,455	67.42%	6,020	32.58%	6,435	34.83%	18,475
King	626,897	71.86%	245,435	28.14%	381,462	43.73%	872,332
Kitsap	66,262	57.73%	48,521	42.27%	17,741	15.46%	114,783
Kittitas	7,200	43.36%	9,404	56.64%	-2,204	-13.27%	16,604
Klickitat	4,467	46.36%	5,169	53.64%	-702	-7.29%	9,636
Lewis	12,883	40.60%	18,846	59.40%	-5,963	-18.79%	31,729
Lincoln	2,024	36.00%	3,598	64.00%	-1,574	-28.00%	5,622
Mason	14,327	54.30%	12,056	45.70%	2,271	8.61%	26,383
Okanogan	7,500	46.05%	8,788	53.95%	-1,288	-7.91%	16,288
Pacific	5,461	55.63%	4,356	44.37%	1,105	11.26%	9,817
Pend Oreille	2,772	43.58%	3,588	56.42%	-816	-12.83%	6,360
Pierce	181,272	57.24%	135,415	42.76%	45,857	14.48%	316,687
San Juan	6,923	69.89%	2,983	30.11%	3,940	39.77%	9,906
Skagit	27,501	53.91%	23,510	46.09%	3,991	7.82%	51,011
Skamania	2,570	50.95%	2,474	49.05%	96	1.90%	5,044
Snohomish	178,169	58.16%	128,173	41.84%	49,996	16.32%	306,342
Spokane	108,255	51.67%	101,241	48.33%	7,014	3.35%	209,496
Stevens	8,459	39.80%	12,793	60.20%	-4,334	-20.39%	21,252
Thurston	71,180	60.98%	45,548	39.02%	25,632	21.96%	116,728
Wahkiakum	1,072	51.17%	1,023	48.83%	49	2.34%	2,095
Walla Walla	9,697	41.36%	13,747	58.64%	-4,050	-17.28%	23,444
Whatcom	54,723	57.29%	40,801	42.71%	13,922	14.57%	95,524
Whitman	8,291	52.82%	7,407	47.18%	884	5.63%	15,698
Yakima	32,687	44.88%	40,148	55.12%	-7,461	-10.24%	72,835
Totals	1,692,083	58.74%	1,188,411	41.26%	503,672	17.49%	2,880,494

Counties that flipped from Democratic to Republican

- Okanogan (largest city: Omak)

Counties that flipped from Republican to Democratic

- Clallam (largest city: Port Angeles)
- Clark (largest city: Vancouver)
- Cowlitz (largest city: Longview)
- Grays Harbor (largest city: Aberdeen)
- Island (largest city: Oak Harbor)
- Kitsap (largest city: Bremerton)
- Mason (largest city: Shelton)
- Pacific (largest city: Raymond)
- Pierce (largest city: Tacoma)
- Skagit (largest city: Mount Vernon)
- Skamania (largest city: Carson)
- Spokane (largest city: Spokane)
- Thurston (largest city: Lacey)
- Wahkiakum (largest city: Puget Island)
- Whitman (largest city: Pullman)

==== By congressional district ====
Goldmark won eight of ten congressional districts, including two that elected Republicans.

District	Goldmark	Didier	Representative
1st	56%	44%	Suzan DelBene
2nd	61%	39%	Rick Larsen
3rd	51%	49%	Jaime Herrera Beutler
4th	39%	61%	Doc Hastings
5th	49%	51%	Cathy McMorris Rodgers
6th	59%	41%	Derek Kilmer
7th	82%	18%	Jim McDermott
8th	52%	48%	Dave Reichert
9th	71%	29%	Adam Smith
10th	59%	41%	Denny Heck
