= 2008 Washington Public Lands Commissioner election =

- November 4, 2008
Candidate	Peter J. Goldmark	Doug Sutherland
Party	Democratic	Republican
Popular vote	1,416,904	1,385,903
Percentage	50.55%	49.45%
- Goldmark: 50–60% 60–70% 70–80% Sutherland: 50–60% 60–70% 70–80%
Public Lands Commissioner before election
Doug Sutherland
Republican
Elected Public Lands Commissioner
Peter J. Goldmark
Democratic

The 2008 Washington Public Lands Commissioner election was held on November 4, 2008, to elect the Washington Public Lands Commissioner, concurrently with the 2008 U.S. presidential election, as well as elections to the U.S. Senate and various state and local elections, including for U.S. House and governor of Washington.

Democrat Peter J. Goldmark narrowly defeated incumbent Republican Public Lands Commissioner Doug Sutherland.

== Candidates ==
Washington is one of two states that holds a top-two primary, meaning that all candidates are listed on the same ballot regardless of party affiliation, and the top two move on to the general election.

=== Republican Party ===
==== Advanced to general ====
- Doug Sutherland, incumbent public lands commissioner (2001–2009)

=== Democratic Party ===
==== Advanced to general ====
- Peter J. Goldmark, rancher and candidate for Washington's 5th congressional district in 2006

== Primary election ==
=== Results ===
County results Sutherland: 50–60%; 60–70%; Goldmark: 50–60%; 60–70%

Congressional district results Sutherland: 50–60%; 60–70%; Goldmark: 50–60%; 70–80%

Blanket primary results
Party	Candidate	Votes	%
Republican	Doug Sutherland (incumbent)	691,145	51.13
Democratic	Peter J. Goldmark	660,714	48.87
Total votes		1,351,859	100.00

==== By county ====
County results
County	Doug Sutherland Republican		Peter J. Goldmark Democratic		Margin		Total votes
County	#	%	#	%	#	%	Total votes
Adams	1,709	68.33%	792	31.67%	917	36.67%	2,501
Asotin	2,906	55.38%	2,341	44.62%	565	10.77%	5,247
Benton	24,980	66.40%	12,638	33.60%	12,342	32.81%	37,618
Chelan	10,240	61.22%	6,487	38.78%	3,753	22.44%	16,727
Clallam	11,969	55.33%	9,662	44.67%	2,307	10.67%	21,631
Clark	38,475	53.58%	33,327	46.42%	5,148	7.17%	71,802
Columbia	1,012	68.84%	458	31.16%	554	37.69%	1,470
Cowlitz	10,541	49.29%	10,845	50.71%	-304	-1.42%	21,386
Douglas	5,159	62.18%	3,138	37.82%	2,021	24.36%	8,297
Ferry	1,180	58.27%	845	41.73%	335	16.54%	2,025
Franklin	7,104	65.77%	3,698	34.23%	3,406	31.53%	10,802
Garfield	507	67.78%	241	32.22%	266	35.56%	748
Grant	9,284	63.38%	5,364	36.62%	3,920	26.76%	14,648
Grays Harbor	9,242	54.44%	7,733	45.56%	1,509	8.89%	16,975
Island	12,351	52.10%	11,356	47.90%	995	4.20%	23,707
Jefferson	5,079	40.58%	7,436	59.42%	-2,357	-18.83%	12,515
King	137,487	41.23%	196,000	58.77%	-58,513	-17.55%	333,487
Kitsap	32,373	51.03%	31,060	48.97%	1,313	2.07%	63,433
Kittitas	5,828	60.96%	3,733	39.04%	2,095	21.91%	9,561
Klickitat	2,878	55.81%	2,279	44.19%	599	11.62%	5,157
Lewis	12,539	66.10%	6,430	33.90%	6,109	32.21%	18,969
Lincoln	2,291	60.59%	1,490	39.41%	801	21.18%	3,781
Mason	9,289	55.86%	7,340	44.14%	1,949	11.72%	16,629
Okanogan	4,584	51.29%	4,353	48.71%	231	2.58%	8,937
Pacific	3,367	50.61%	3,286	49.39%	81	1.22%	6,653
Pend Oreille	2,158	57.69%	1,583	42.31%	575	15.37%	3,741
Pierce	80,609	55.61%	64,349	44.39%	16,260	11.22%	144,958
San Juan	2,538	38.75%	4,011	61.25%	-1,473	-22.49%	6,549
Skagit	15,698	53.30%	13,752	46.70%	1,946	6.61%	29,450
Skamania	1,264	52.67%	1,136	47.33%	128	5.33%	2,400
Snohomish	69,230	49.77%	69,864	50.23%	-634	-0.46%	139,094
Spokane	54,445	51.39%	51,495	48.61%	2,950	2.78%	105,940
Stevens	7,737	62.31%	4,679	37.69%	3,058	24.63%	12,416
Thurston	33,195	52.29%	30,286	47.71%	2,909	4.58%	63,481
Wahkiakum	787	58.08%	568	41.92%	219	16.16%	1,355
Walla Walla	8,196	62.07%	5,009	37.93%	3,187	24.13%	13,205
Whatcom	23,305	49.95%	23,349	50.05%	-44	-0.09%	46,654
Whitman	4,231	52.62%	3,810	47.38%	421	5.24%	8,041
Yakima	25,378	63.65%	14,491	36.35%	10,887	27.31%	39,869
Totals	691,145	51.13%	660,714	48.87%	30,431	2.25%	1,351,859

==== By congressional district ====
District	Sutherland	Goldmark	Representative
1st	48%	52%	Jay Inslee
2nd	51%	49%	Rick Larsen
3rd	54%	46%	Brian Baird
4th	64%	36%	Doc Hastings
5th	54%	46%	Cathy McMorris Rodgers
6th	53%	47%	Norm Dicks
7th	25%	75%	Jim McDermott
8th	55%	45%	Dave Reichert
9th	53%	47%	Adam Smith

== General election ==
=== Endorsements ===
Peter J. Goldmark (D)

Newspapers

- The Seattle Times

=== Polling ===
Poll source	Date(s) administered	Sample size	Margin of error	Doug Sutherland (R)	Peter Goldmark (D)	Undecided
SurveyUSA	October 30 – November 2, 2008	663 (LV)	± 3.9%	48%	42%	10%
SurveyUSA	October 26–27, 2008	630 (LV)	± 4.0%	45%	43%	12%
SurveyUSA	October 12–13, 2008	544 (LV)	± 4.3%	47%	38%	15%

=== Results ===
2008 Washington Public Lands Commissioner election
Party	Candidate	Votes	%	±%
Democratic	Peter J. Goldmark	1,416,904	50.55	+3.88
Republican	Doug Sutherland (incumbent)	1,385,903	49.45	–0.51
Total votes		2,802,807	100.00	N/A
Democratic gain from Republican				

==== By county ====
County results
County	Doug Sutherland Republican		Peter J. Goldmark Democratic		Margin		Total votes
County	#	%	#	%	#	%	Total votes
Adams	3,077	68.50%	1,415	31.50%	-1,662	-37.00%	4,492
Asotin	5,180	56.78%	3,943	43.22%	-1,237	-13.56%	9,123
Benton	45,384	66.96%	22,392	33.04%	-22,992	-33.92%	67,776
Chelan	18,318	61.24%	11,596	38.76%	-6,722	-22.47%	29,914
Clallam	20,349	56.12%	15,913	43.88%	-4,436	-12.23%	36,262
Clark	88,956	52.92%	79,143	47.08%	-9,813	-5.84%	168,099
Columbia	1,423	68.71%	648	31.29%	-775	-37.42%	2,071
Cowlitz	21,964	52.36%	19,988	47.64%	-1,976	-4.71%	41,952
Douglas	8,942	62.95%	5,262	37.05%	-3,680	-25.91%	14,204
Ferry	1,908	57.78%	1,394	42.22%	-514	-15.57%	3,302
Franklin	12,157	65.12%	6,513	34.88%	-5,644	-30.23%	18,670
Garfield	913	72.46%	347	27.54%	-566	-44.92%	1,260
Grant	16,502	64.28%	9,170	35.72%	-7,332	-28.56%	25,672
Grays Harbor	16,852	60.53%	10,988	39.47%	-5,864	-21.06%	27,840
Island	20,547	52.61%	18,511	47.39%	-2,036	-5.21%	39,058
Jefferson	7,700	41.18%	10,997	58.82%	3,297	17.63%	18,697
King	314,993	38.12%	511,295	61.88%	196,302	23.76%	826,288
Kitsap	59,942	51.46%	56,552	48.54%	-3,390	-2.91%	116,494
Kittitas	9,874	59.71%	6,663	40.29%	-3,211	-19.42%	16,537
Klickitat	5,208	55.18%	4,231	44.82%	-977	-10.35%	9,439
Lewis	22,365	67.84%	10,602	32.16%	-11,763	-35.68%	32,967
Lincoln	3,489	62.36%	2,106	37.64%	-1,383	-24.72%	5,595
Mason	15,407	56.97%	11,635	43.03%	-3,772	-13.95%	27,042
Okanogan	8,028	49.74%	8,112	50.26%	84	0.52%	16,140
Pacific	5,685	55.04%	4,643	44.96%	-1,042	-10.09%	10,328
Pend Oreille	3,666	59.14%	2,533	40.86%	-1,133	-18.28%	6,199
Pierce	170,256	54.79%	140,483	45.21%	-29,773	-9.58%	310,739
San Juan	3,633	37.29%	6,110	62.71%	2,477	25.42%	9,743
Skagit	28,222	54.01%	24,032	45.99%	-4,190	-8.02%	52,254
Skamania	2,738	54.13%	2,320	45.87%	-418	-8.26%	5,058
Snohomish	147,375	49.32%	151,459	50.68%	4,084	1.37%	298,834
Spokane	106,492	51.93%	98,569	48.07%	-7,923	-3.86%	205,061
Stevens	13,064	61.66%	8,123	38.34%	-4,941	-23.32%	21,187
Thurston	63,028	53.40%	55,008	46.60%	-8,020	-6.79%	118,036
Wahkiakum	1,242	58.78%	871	41.22%	-371	-17.56%	2,113
Walla Walla	14,152	62.72%	8,412	37.28%	-5,740	-25.44%	22,564
Whatcom	45,234	48.53%	47,978	51.47%	2,744	2.94%	93,212
Whitman	8,377	52.01%	7,731	47.99%	-646	-4.01%	16,108
Yakima	43,261	59.69%	29,216	40.31%	-14,045	-19.38%	72,477
Totals	1,385,903	49.45%	1,416,904	50.55%	31,001	1.11%	2,802,807

Counties that flipped from Republican to Democratic

- Okanogan (largest city: Omak)

==== By congressional district ====
Despite losing the state, Sutherland won seven of nine congressional districts, including four that elected Democrats.

District	Sutherland	Goldmark	Representative
1st	47%	53%	Jay Inslee
2nd	51%	49%	Rick Larsen
3rd	54%	46%	Brian Baird
4th	63%	37%	Doc Hastings
5th	54%	46%	Cathy McMorris Rodgers
6th	53%	47%	Norm Dicks
7th	23%	77%	Jim McDermott
8th	53%	47%	Dave Reichert
9th	52%	48%	Adam Smith
