= Clint Didier =

American football player and politician (born 1959)

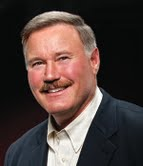
- Didier in 2010

Member of Franklin County Commission from the 3rd district
- Incumbent
- Assumed office January 2, 2019
- Preceded by: Rick Miller

Personal details
- Born: April 4, 1959 (age 67) Connell, Washington, U.S.
- Party: Republican
- Education: Portland State University (BS)
- Football career

No. 86, 80
- Position: Tight end

Personal information
- Listed height: 6 ft 5 in (1.96 m)
- Listed weight: 240 lb (109 kg)

Career information
- High school: Connell
- College: Portland State
- NFL draft: 1981: 12th round, 314th overall pick

Career history
- Washington Redskins (1981–1987); Green Bay Packers (1988–1989)

Awards and highlights
- 2× Super Bowl champion (XVII, XXII)

Career NFL statistics
- Receptions: 141
- Receiving yards: 1,923
- Receiving touchdowns: 21
- Stats at Pro Football Reference

Clinton Bradley Didier (born April 4, 1959) is an American politician and former professional football player who was a tight end for the Washington Redskins and Green Bay Packers of the National Football League (NFL). He won two Super Bowls with Washington. A perennial candidate, he later sought elected office on four occasions. Didier was eventually elected to political office in 2018, as a Franklin County Commissioner.

== Early life and education ==
Didier was born to Donald and Alice Didier in Connell, Washington. Very little information about his early life is recorded, but he is mentioned in an interview given by his mother to Robert Franklin in 2016 for the Hanford Oral History Project at Washington State University Tri-Cities. Didier earned a Bachelor of Science degree from Portland State University.

== Career ==
=== Football ===
A wide receiver in college, Didier was converted to a tight end in the National Football League (NFL), playing for the Washington Redskins from 1982 to 1987 and for the Green Bay Packers from 1988 to 1989. Didier won two Super Bowl rings as a member of the Redskins, in Super Bowl XVII and Super Bowl XXII. He was also the Redskins' second leading receiver in Super Bowl XVIII, catching five passes for 65 yards in their 38–9 loss. He scored a touchdown in Super Bowl XXII. He finished his NFL career with 141 receptions for 1,923 yards and 21 touchdowns in 105 games.

He was inducted into the Portland State Football Hall of Fame in 2000, and into the Central Washington Football Hall of Fame in 2002.

Didier coached high school football at Connell High School from 1999 to 2009. Didier was the team's offensive coordinator and also briefly coached the freshmen team and defensive ends. During his tenure as offensive coordinator Connell won six league titles and two State championships in 2002, and 2009 respectively. The team also finished 2nd twice in 2006 and 2007 losing to Meridian and Royal City during those seasons. Didier's teams typically ranked near the top in scoring in the SCAC. Didier stepped down from his position as offensive coordinator in 2009 after helping lead Connell to 14–0 season and a state championship.

== Politics ==
Didier was a perennial candidate, having unsuccessfully run for office on four occasions over a six-year period: for United States Senate in 2010, for Washington Commissioner of Public Lands in 2012, and for United States House of Representatives in 2014 and 2016.

=== Franklin County Commission ===
In 2018, Didier announced a run for the Franklin County Commission, District 3. He made it through the primary and faced Democrat Zahra Roach in the November election He was elected to his first office with 56% of the vote, was sworn in on January 2, 2019, and participated in his first meeting the same day.

== Personal life ==
Didier owns various real estate property businesses including farmland in Franklin County, Washington.
