= Cathy McMorris Rodgers =

American politician (born 1969)

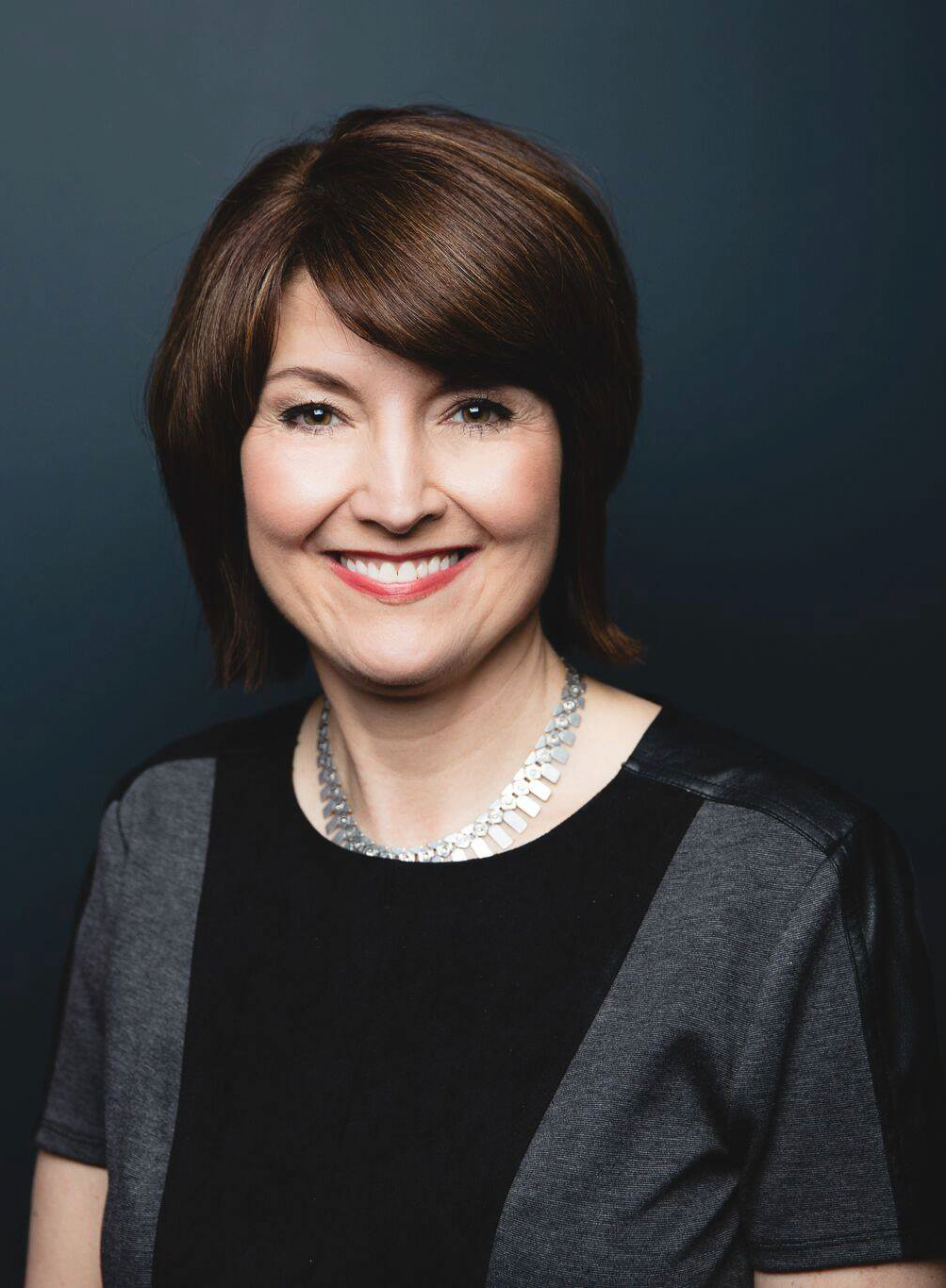
- Official portrait, 2016

Member of the U.S. House of Representatives from Washington's 5th district
- In office January 3, 2005 – January 3, 2025
- Preceded by: George Nethercutt
- Succeeded by: Michael Baumgartner
House positions
Chair of the House Energy and Commerce Committee
In office January 3, 2023 – January 3, 2025
| Preceded by | Frank Pallone |
| Succeeded by | Brett Guthrie |
Ranking Member of the House Energy and Commerce Committee
In office January 3, 2021 – January 3, 2023
| Preceded by | Greg Walden |
| Succeeded by | Frank Pallone |
Chair of the House Republican Conference
In office January 3, 2013 – January 3, 2019
| Deputy | Lynn Jenkins; Doug Collins |
| Leader | John Boehner; Paul Ryan |
| Preceded by | Jeb Hensarling |
| Succeeded by | Liz Cheney |
Vice Chair of the House Republican Conference
In office January 3, 2009 – January 3, 2013
| Leader | John Boehner |
| Preceded by | Kay Granger |
| Succeeded by | Lynn Jenkins |

Minority Leader of the Washington House of Representatives
- In office January 13, 2003 – January 10, 2004
- Preceded by: Clyde Ballard
- Succeeded by: Richard DeBolt

Member of the Washington House of Representatives from the 7th district
- In office January 7, 1994 – January 3, 2005
- Preceded by: Bob Morton
- Succeeded by: Joel Kretz

Personal details
- Born: Cathy Anne McMorris; May 22, 1969 (age 57) Salem, Oregon, U.S.
- Party: Republican
- Spouse: Brian Rodgers (m. 2006)
- Children: 3
- Education: Pensacola Christian College (BA); University of Washington (MBA)
- McMorris Rodgers's voice McMorris Rodgers on delisting the gray wolf as an endangered species. Recorded November 16, 2018

Cathy Anne McMorris Rodgers (born May 22, 1969) is an American politician who served from 2005 to 2025 as the United States representative for Washington's 5th congressional district, which encompasses the eastern third of the state and includes Spokane, the state's second-largest city. A Republican, McMorris Rodgers previously served in the Washington House of Representatives. From 2013 to 2019, she chaired the House Republican Conference.

McMorris Rodgers was appointed to the Washington House of Representatives in 1994. She became the minority leader in 2001. In 2004, she was elected to the U.S. House of Representatives. She eventually became the highest-ranking Republican woman in Congress in 2009, when she ascended to leadership as vice chair of the House Republican Conference, and later, chair of the House Republican Conference. She gained national attention in 2014, when she delivered the Republican response to President Barack Obama's 2014 State of the Union Address.

In February 2024, she announced she would not seek reelection for the 2024 elections. Republican Michael Baumgartner was elected to her seat and succeeded her in the 119th Congress.

== Early life and education ==
Cathy McMorris was born May 22, 1969, in Salem, Oregon, the daughter of Corrine (née Robinson) and Wayne McMorris. Her family had come to the American West in the mid-19th century as pioneers along the Oregon Trail. In 1974, when McMorris was five years old, her family moved to Hazelton, British Columbia, Canada. The family lived in a cabin while they built a log home on their farm. In 1984, the McMorrises settled in Kettle Falls, Washington, and established the Peachcrest Fruit Basket Orchard and Fruit Stand. McMorris worked there for 13 years.

In 1990, McMorris earned a bachelor's degree in pre-law from Pensacola Christian College, a then-unaccredited Independent Baptist liberal arts college. She earned an Executive MBA from the University of Washington in 2002.

== Career ==
=== Washington House of Representatives, 1994–2005 ===
After completing her undergraduate education, McMorris was hired by state representative Bob Morton in 1991 as his campaign manager, and later as his legislative assistant. She became a member of the state legislature when she was appointed to the Washington House of Representatives in 1994. Her appointment filled the vacancy caused by Morton's appointment to the Washington State Senate. After being sworn into office on January 11, 1994, she represented the 7th Legislative District (parts or all of Ferry, Lincoln, Okanogan, Pend Oreille, Spokane, and Stevens Counties). She retained the seat in a 1994 special election.

In 1997, she co-sponsored legislation to ban same-sex marriage in Washington State.

In 2001, she blocked legislation "to replace all references to 'Oriental' in state documents with 'Asian'", explaining, "I'm very reluctant to continue to focus on setting up different definitions in statute related to the various minority groups. I'd really like to see us get beyond that."

She voted against a 2004 bill to add sexual orientation to the state's anti-discrimination law, and was a vocal opponent of same-sex marriage. She is credited for sponsoring legislation to require the state reimburse rural hospitals for the cost of serving Medicaid patients, and for her work overcoming opposition in her own caucus to pass a controversial gas tax used to fund transportation improvements.

From 2002 to 2003, she served as House minority leader, the top House Republican leadership post. She chaired the House Commerce and Labor Committee, the Joint Legislative Audit and Review Committee, and the State Government Committee. She stepped down as minority leader in 2003 after announcing her candidacy for Congress. During her tenure in the legislature, she lived in Colville; she has since moved to Spokane.

== U.S. House of Representatives ==
=== Elections ===
In 2004, McMorris ran for the United States House of Representatives in the 5th District; she already represented much of the district's northern portion. She received 59.7% of the vote for an open seat, defeating the Democratic nominee, hotel magnate Don Barbieri. The seat had become vacant when five-term incumbent George Nethercutt retired to run for the U.S. Senate.

=== Tenure ===
McMorris Rodgers is a member of the Republican Main Street Partnership, the Congressional Constitution Caucus, and the Congressional Western Caucus.

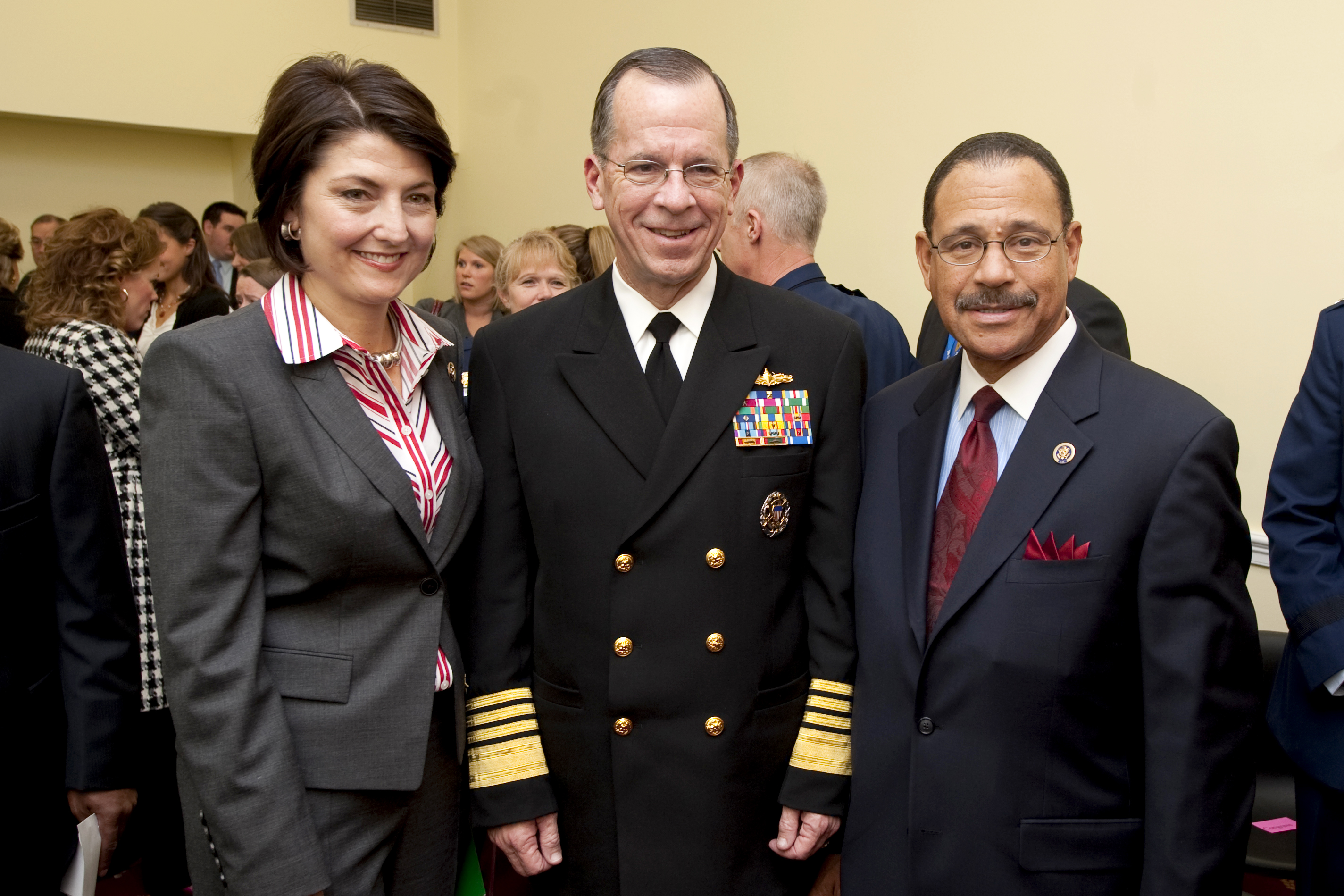
McMorris Rodgers, Michael Mullen and Sanford Bishop, 2009

In November 2006, McMorris Rodgers was reelected with 56.4% of the vote, to Democratic nominee Peter J. Goldmark's 43.6%. In 2007, she became the Republican co-chair of the Congressional Caucus for Women's Issues, which pushed for pay equity, tougher child support enforcement, women's health programs, and laws protecting victims of domestic violence and sexual assault.

In 2008, McMorris Rodgers received 211,305 votes (65.28%), to Democratic nominee Mark Mays's 112,382 votes (34.72%). On November 19, 2008, she was elected to serve as vice chair of the House Republican Conference for the 111th United States Congress, making her the fourth-highest-ranking Republican in her caucus leadership (after John Boehner, Minority Whip Eric Cantor, and conference chair Mike Pence) and the highest-ranking Republican woman. In 2009, she became vice chair of the House Republican Conference, and served until 2012, when she was succeeded by Lynn Jenkins.

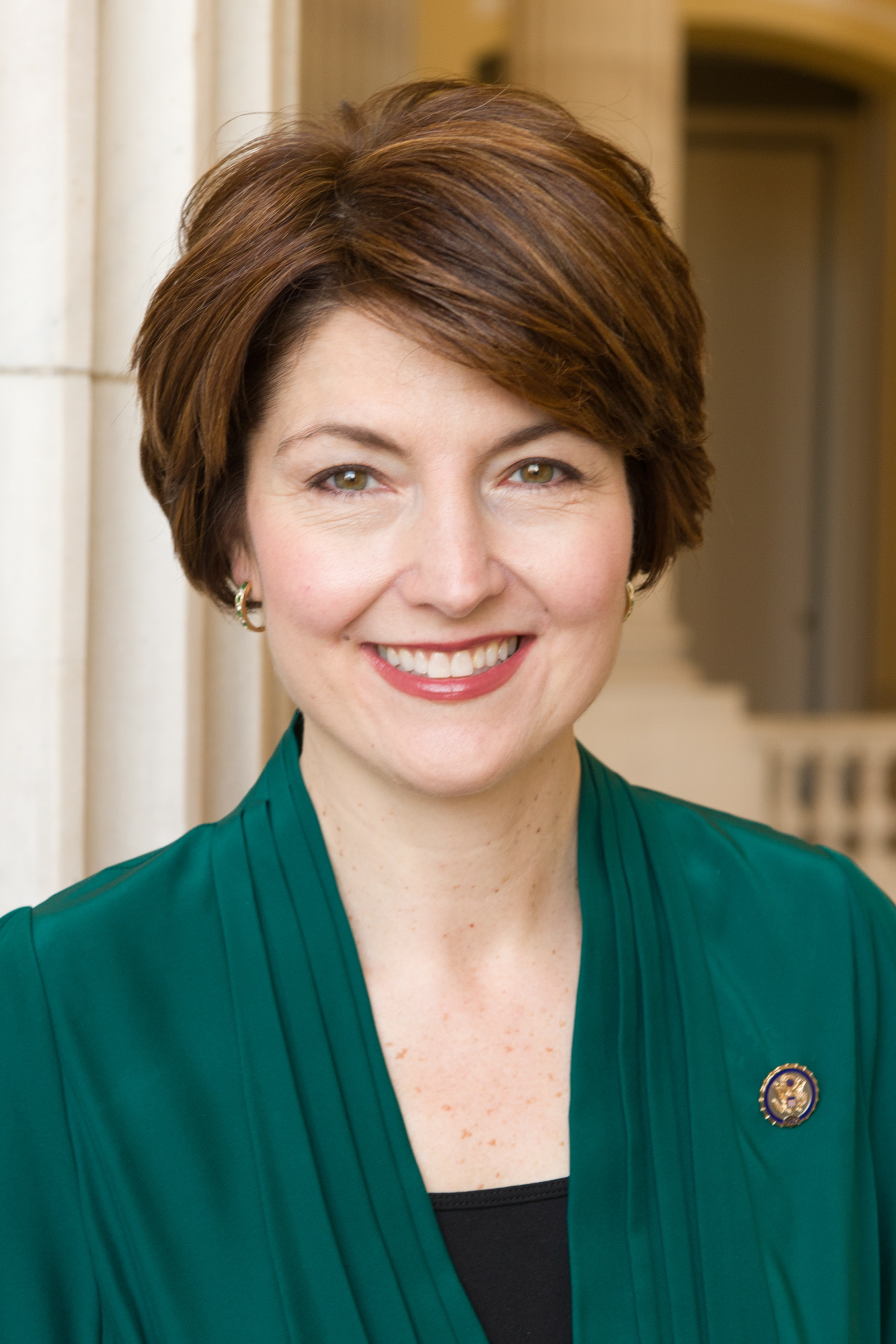
112th Congress portrait, 2011

McMorris Rodgers won the 2010 general election with 150,681 votes (64%), to Democratic nominee Daryl Romeyn's 85,686 (36%). Romeyn spent only $2,320, against McMorris Rodgers's $1,453,240. On November 14, 2012, she defeated Representative Tom Price to become chair of the House Republican Conference.

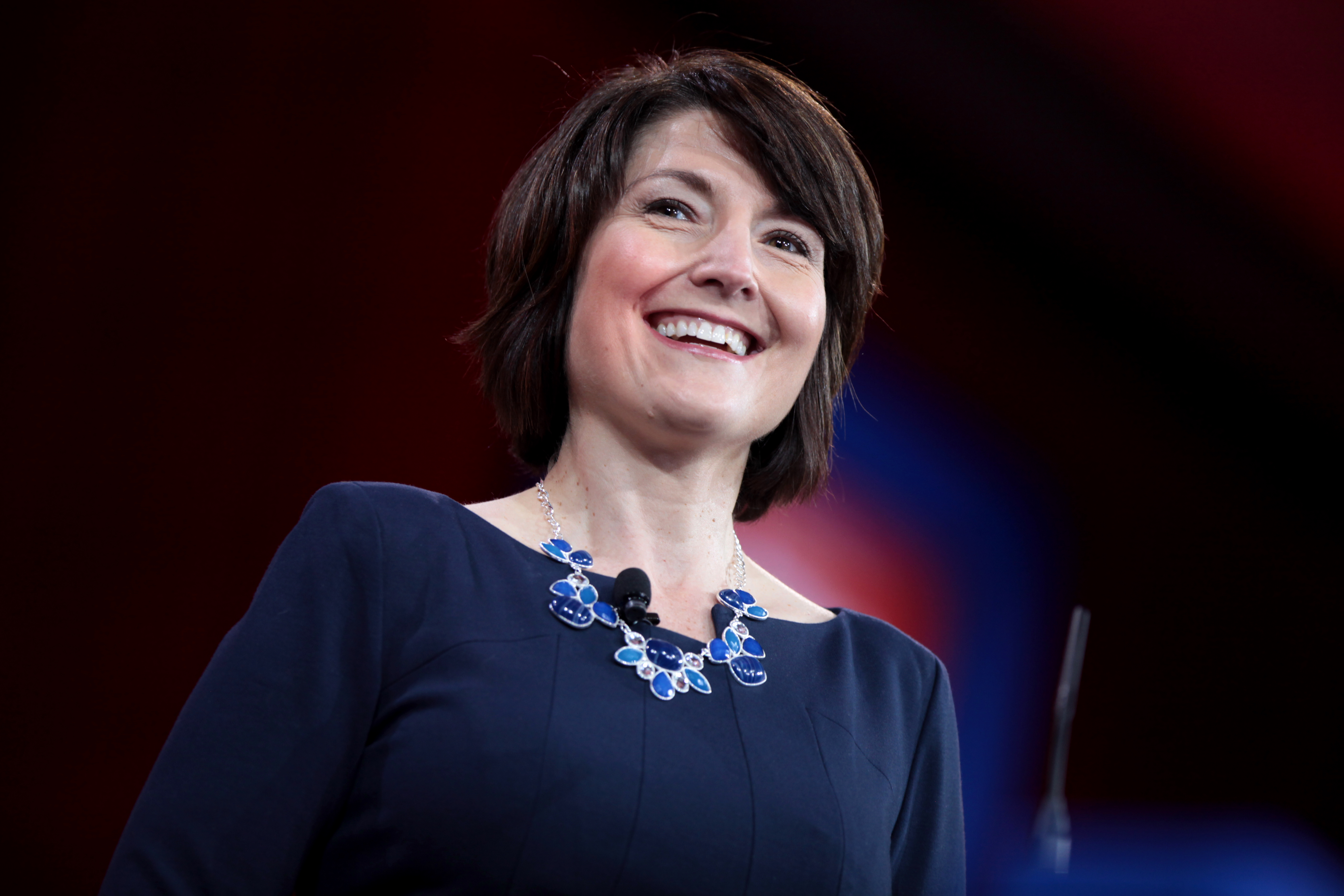
McMorris Rodgers speaking at the 2015 Conservative Political Action Conference

In the 2012 general election, McMorris Rodgers defeated Democratic nominee Rich Cowan, 191,066 votes (61.9%) to 117,512 (38.9%).

McMorris Rodgers sponsored legislation that would speed the licensing process for dams and promote energy production. According to a Department of Energy study, retrofitting the largest 100 dams in the country could produce enough power for an additional 3.2 million homes. The legislation reached President Obama's desk without a single dissenter on Capitol Hill.

In January 2014, it was announced that McMorris Rodgers would give the Republican response to President Barack Obama's 2014 State of the Union Address. House speaker John Boehner and Republican Senate leader Mitch McConnell made the decision. McMorris Rodgers is the 12th woman to give the response, and the fifth female Republican, but only the third Republican to do so alone, after New Jersey governor Christine Todd Whitman in 1995 and the Spanish response by Florida representative Ileana Ros-Lehtinen, the most senior female Republican in the U.S. House of Representatives, in 2011. Ros-Lehtinen also gave the Spanish response that year, which was largely a translation of McMorris Rogers' remarks.

In 2014, the Office of Congressional Ethics recommended that the United States House Committee on Ethics initiate a probe into allegations by a former McMorris Rodgers staff member that McMorris Rodgers had improperly mixed campaign money and official funds to help win the 2012 GOP leadership race against Price. McMorris Rodgers denied the allegations. In September 2015, Brett O'Donnell, who worked for McMorris Rodgers, pleaded guilty to lying to House ethics investigators about how much campaign work he did while being paid by lawmakers' office accounts, becoming the first person to be convicted of lying to the House Office of Congressional Ethics. The OCE found that McMorris Rodgers improperly used campaign funds to pay O'Donnell for help in her congressional office, and improperly held a debate prep session in her congressional office. A lawyer for McMorris Rodgers denied that campaign and official resources had ever been improperly mixed. The House Ethics Committee did not take any action on the matter.

In 2014, McMorris Rodgers faced Democratic nominee Joe Pakootas, the first Native American candidate to run for Congress in Washington state. McMorris Rodgers defeated Pakootas, 135,470 votes (60.68%) to 87,772 (39.32%).

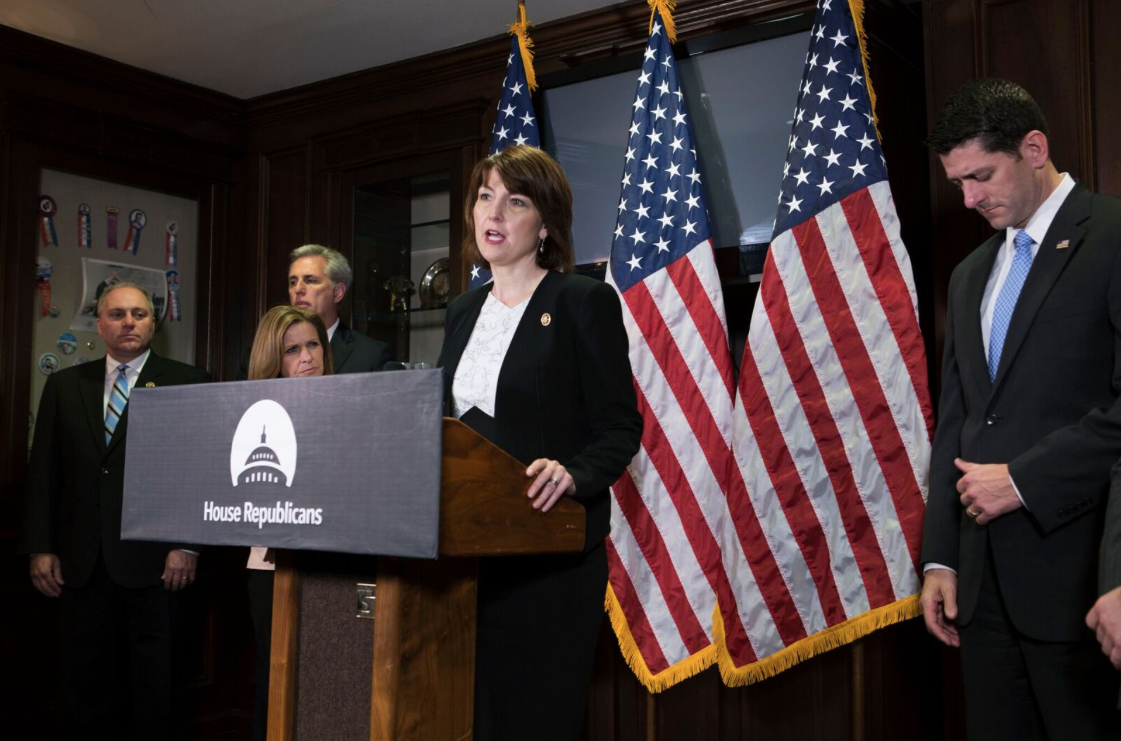
McMorris Rodgers speaking at a press conference with House leadership, in Washington, 2016

In 2016, McMorris Rodgers defeated Pakootas again, 192,959 votes (59.64%) to 130,575 (40.36%).

In 2018, McMorris Rodgers faced Democratic nominee Lisa Brown, a former majority leader of the state senate and former chancellor of WSU Spokane. In the August blanket primary, McMorris Rodgers received 49.29% of the vote to Brown's 45.36%. As of early August, McMorris Rodgers had raised about $3.8 million, and Brown about $2.4 million. McMorris Rodgers and Brown participated in a September 2018 debate. Both said they would oppose any cuts to Medicare or Social Security. Both said they supported the Second Amendment to the United States Constitution. An audience member asked how old the candidates believed the earth is; Rodgers said she believed the account in the Bible, and "Brown said she believed in science, but didn't provide a specific age". McMorris defeated Brown with 55% of the vote. Shortly after the election, McMorris Rodgers announced she would stand down from her position as conference chair. Liz Cheney of Wyoming was elected in January 2019 to succeed her.

On February 8, 2024, McMorris Rodgers announced her intent to not run for reelection.

=== Committee assignments ===
- Committee on Energy and Commerce, Chair

=== Caucus memberships ===
- Congressional Ukraine Caucus
- Republican Main Street Partnership
- Republican Study Committee
- Republican Governance Group
- Rare Disease Caucus
- United States–China Working Group

==== Interest group ratings ====
| 2015 | 2014 | 2013 | 2012 | 2011 | 2010 | 2009 | Selected interest group ratings |
|---|---|---|---|---|---|---|---|
| 75 | 72 | 72 | 84 | 80 | 96 | 96 | American Conservative Union |
| 0 | 0 | 5 | 0 | 0 | 0 | 0 | Americans for Democratic Action |
| 58 | 62 | 59 | 70 | 61 | 94 | 82 | Club for Growth |
| — | — | — | – | 0 | 0 | 22 | American Federation of State, County and Municipal Employees |
| 92 | 92 | 75 | 83 | 90 | 100 | – | Family Research Council |
| — | — | 70 | 76 | 72 | 89 | 84 | National Taxpayers Union |
| 100 | 93 | 83 | 100 | 100 | 100 | 80 | Chamber of Commerce of the United States |
| 0 | 5 | 4 | 9 | 7 | 3 | 10 | League of Conservation Voters |

== Political positions ==
=== Health care ===
McMorris Rodgers opposed the Affordable Care Act (Obamacare) and voted repeatedly to repeal it. In late 2013, she wrote a letter accusing Democrats of being "openly hostile to American values and the Constitution", and citing the Affordable Care Act and immigration as evidence that Obama "rule[s] by decree". She blamed the ACA for causing unemployment, and when FactCheck.org reported studies that proved the opposite and asked her office for evidence to support her claims, "McMorris Rodgers's office got back to us not with an answer, but with a question".

McMorris Rodgers responded in 2014 to reports that Obama's program had provided coverage to over 600,000 Washington residents by acknowledging that the law's framework would probably remain, and that she favored reforms within its structure. In May 2017, she voted in favor of the American Health Care Act, a Republican health-care plan designed to repeal and replace large portions of the ACA. McMorris Rodgers was the only member of Washington's congressional delegation to vote for the bill, which passed the House by a 217–213 vote. The bill would have eliminated the individual mandate, made large cuts to Medicaid, and allowed insurers to charge higher rates to people with preexisting conditions.

In her 2018 reelection campaign, McMorris Rodgers did not mention the Affordable Care Act.

In 2023, McMorris Rodgers led on a health care bill that aimed to increase transparency in health care pricing and ultimately reduce medical costs. The bipartisan piece of legislation passed the House of Representatives by a vote of 320-71.

=== LGBT rights ===
McMorris Rodgers opposes same-sex marriage, and co-sponsored legislation in 1997 that would ban same-sex marriage in Washington state. She co-sponsored the "Marriage Protection Amendment", an amendment to the Constitution to prohibit same-sex marriage that failed to pass the House in 2006.

When a bill was introduced in the state legislature in 2004 that would ban discrimination based on sexual orientation, she voted against it; another bill was introduced in 2006, one year after she entered the House of Representatives. This bill was subsequently passed and signed into law by Governor Christine Gregoire.

During an interview with Nick Gillespie in 2014, McMorris Rodgers stated her belief that marriage should be between a man and a woman and her belief that marriage is a state, not federal, issue.

In 2015, McMorris Rodgers voted against upholding Obama's 2014 executive order banning federal contractors from making hiring decisions that discriminate based on sexual orientation or gender identity.

In 2016, McMorris Rodgers voted against the Maloney Amendment to H.R. 5055 which would prohibit the use of funds for government contractors who discriminate against LGBT employees.

In 2019 and 2021, McMorris Rodgers voted against the Equality Act. The bill would prohibit "discrimination based on sex, sexual orientation, and gender identity in areas including public accommodations and facilities, education, federal funding, employment, housing, credit, and the jury system." She issued a statement claiming that the bill "did not do enough to protect religious liberty."

In 2022, McMorris Rodgers voted against the Respect for Marriage Act, which would establish federal protections for same-sex and interracial marriages.

=== Foreign policy ===
In 2019, McMorris Rodgers was appointed as the Republican Representative to the United Nations General Assembly

In 2020, McMorris Rodgers voted against the National Defense Authorization Act of 2021, which would prevent the president from withdrawing soldiers from Afghanistan without congressional approval.

In 2022 during the prelude to the Russian invasion of Ukraine, McMorris Rodgers stated that she opposed sending American soldiers into Ukraine as a means to deter Russia. McMorris Rodgers was also the only Washington representative to vote against providing $14 billion in humanitarian aid to the government of Ukraine. McMorris Rodgers voted in support of sending aid to Ukraine, Israel and Taiwan, a bipartisan effort bill aimed at helping U.S. allies

In 2022, McMorris Rodgers helped establish the bipartisan, bicameral Abraham Accords Caucus to support peace in the Middle East.

=== Marijuana legalization ===
McMorris Rodgers has expressed support for the enforcement of federal law in states that have legalized marijuana, saying in 2017: "I think about access to marijuana and the other drugs that I believe it leads to. Right now, it's against the law at the federal level, and until it's changed at the federal level, I would support [Jeff Sessions's] efforts." She later walked back her position, saying that she "lean[s] against" Sessions's move to rescind the 2013 Cole Memorandum. McMorris Rodgers also repeatedly voted against the Rohrabacher–Farr amendment, legislation that limits the enforcement of federal law in states that have legalized medical cannabis.

=== School safety ===
In 2018, McMorris Rodgers co-sponsored the STOP (Students, Teachers, and Officers Preventing) School Violence Act, which established a federal grant program to "provide $50 million a year for a new federal grant program to train students, teachers, and law enforcement on how to spot and report signs of gun violence", and authorize $25 million for new physical security measures in schools, such as "new locks, lights, metal detectors, and panic buttons". A separate spending bill would be required to provide money for the grant program. The House voted 407–10 to approve the bill.

=== Donald Trump ===
After Donald Trump was elected president in 2016, McMorris Rodgers became the vice-chair of his transition team. She was widely considered a top choice for Secretary of the Interior. Several papers went so far as to announce she had been chosen. Instead, Montana congressman Ryan Zinke was nominated.

McMorris Rodgers supported Trump's 2017 executive order to block entry to the United States to citizens of seven predominantly Muslim nations, calling the order necessary "to protect the American people".

In December 2020, McMorris Rodgers was one of 126 Republican members of the House of Representatives to sign an amicus brief in support of Texas v. Pennsylvania, a lawsuit filed at the United States Supreme Court contesting the results of the 2020 presidential election, in which Joe Biden defeated Trump. The Supreme Court declined to hear the case on the basis that Texas lacked standing under Article III of the Constitution to challenge the results of an election held by another state.

In January 2021, McMorris Rodgers announced her intention to object to the certification of the Electoral College results in Congress, citing allegations of fraud. She reversed her position after pro-Trump rioters stormed the United States Capitol, and said she would vote to certify Biden's win (as indeed she did).

She was the only member of Washington's congressional delegation to vote against the impeachment of Donald Trump for his actions stoking the January 6, 2021 assault on the Capitol.

=== Creationism ===
McMorris Rodgers rejects the theory of evolution, saying, "the account that I believe is the one in the Bible, that God created the world in seven days."

=== Women's rights ===
In March 2013, McMorris Rodgers did not support the continuation of the 1994 Violence Against Women Act, but sponsored a clean reauthorization of the bill. Ultimately, her bill failed, and the House adopted the Senate version of the bill.

=== Broadband ===
In 2021, McMorris Rodgers introduced legislation to prohibit municipalities from building their own broadband networks.

=== Immigration ===
McMorris Rodgers voted against the Further Consolidated Appropriations Act of 2020 which authorizes DHS to nearly double the available H-2B visas for the remainder of FY 2020.

McMorris Rodgers voted against Consolidated Appropriations Act (H.R. 1158) which effectively prohibits ICE from cooperating with Health and Human Services to detain or remove illegal alien sponsors of unaccompanied alien children (UACs).

=== Big tech ===
In July 2021, McMorris Rodgers introduced draft legislation that would allow users of Big Tech platforms to sue companies if they think the companies censored speech protected by the First Amendment.

In 2024, McMorris Rodgers voted in favor of banning TikTok for their ties to the Communist China Party and posing as a national security threat. McMorris Rodgers would lead the Energy and Commerce Committee in a hearing with the TikTok CEO Shou Chew, who testified on TikTok's consumer privacy and data security practices, the platforms' impact on kids, and its relationship with the Chinese Communist Party.

== Electoral history ==
Electoral history is not available for her time as a state representative prior to 2005.

| Year | Office | District | Democratic | | Republican | |
|---|---|---|---|---|---|---|
| 2004 | U.S. House of Representatives | Washington 5th District | Don Barbieri | 40% (121,333) | Cathy McMorris | 60% (179,600) |
| 2006 | U.S. House of Representatives | Washington 5th District | Peter J. Goldmark | 44% (104,357) | Cathy McMorris | 56% (134,967) |
| 2008 | U.S. House of Representatives | Washington 5th District | Mark Mays | 35% (112,382) | Cathy McMorris Rodgers | 65% (211,305) |
| 2010 | U.S. House of Representatives | Washington 5th District | Daryl Romeyn | 36% (101,146) | Cathy McMorris Rodgers | 64% (177,235) |
| 2012 | U.S. House of Representatives | Washington 5th District | Rich Cowan | 38% (117,512) | Cathy McMorris Rodgers | 62% (191,066) |
| 2014 | U.S. House of Representatives | Washington 5th District | Joseph (Joe) Pakootas | 39% (87,772) | Cathy McMorris Rodgers | 61% (135,470) |
| 2016 | U.S. House of Representatives | Washington 5th District | Joe Pakootas | 40% (130,575) | Cathy McMorris Rodgers | 60% (192,959) |
| 2018 | U.S. House of Representatives | Washington 5th District | Lisa Brown | 45% (144,925) | Cathy McMorris Rodgers | 55% (175,422) |
| 2020 | U.S. House of Representatives | Washington 5th District | Dave Wilson | 39% (155,737) | Cathy McMorris Rodgers | 61% (247,815) |
| 2022 | U.S. House of Representatives | Washington 5th District | Natasha Hill | 40% (127,585) | Cathy McMorris Rodgers | 60% (188,648) |

== Personal life ==
Cathy McMorris married Brian Rodgers on August 5, 2006, in San Diego. Brian Rodgers is a retired Navy commander and a Spokane native. He is a U.S. Naval Academy graduate, and the son of David H. Rodgers, the mayor of Spokane from 1967 to 1977. In February 2007, she changed her name to Cathy McMorris Rodgers. Having long resided in Stevens County—first Colville, then Deer Park—she now lives in Spokane.

In April 2007, McMorris Rodgers became the first member of Congress in more than a decade to give birth while in office, with the birth of a son. The couple later announced that their child had been diagnosed with Down syndrome. A second child, a daughter, was born in December 2010, and a second daughter in November 2013.

According to the Official Congressional Directory, she is a member of Grace Evangelical Free Church in Colville.

== See also ==
- Women in the United States House of Representatives

Washington House of Representatives
| Preceded by Clyde Ballard | Minority Leader of the Washington House of Representatives; 2003–2004 | Succeeded by Richard DeBolt |
U.S. House of Representatives
| Preceded by George Nethercutt | Member of the U.S. House of Representatives from Washington's 5th congressional district 2005–2025 | Succeeded by Michael Baumgartner |
| Preceded by Frank Pallone | Chair of the House Energy Committee; 2023–2025 | Succeeded by Brett Guthrie |
Party political offices
| Preceded by Kay Granger | Vice Chair of the House Republican Conference; 2009–2013 | Succeeded by Lynn Jenkins |
| Preceded by Jeb Hensarling | Chair of the House Republican Conference; 2013–2019 | Succeeded by Liz Cheney |
| Preceded by Marco Rubio | Response to the State of the Union address 2014 | Succeeded by Joni Ernst |
U.S. order of precedence (ceremonial)
| Preceded by Doc Hastings as Former U.S. Representative | Order of precedence of the United States as Former U.S. Representative | Succeeded by Dick Schulze as Former U.S. Representative |
