= 2024 Washington State Treasurer election =

- November 5, 2024
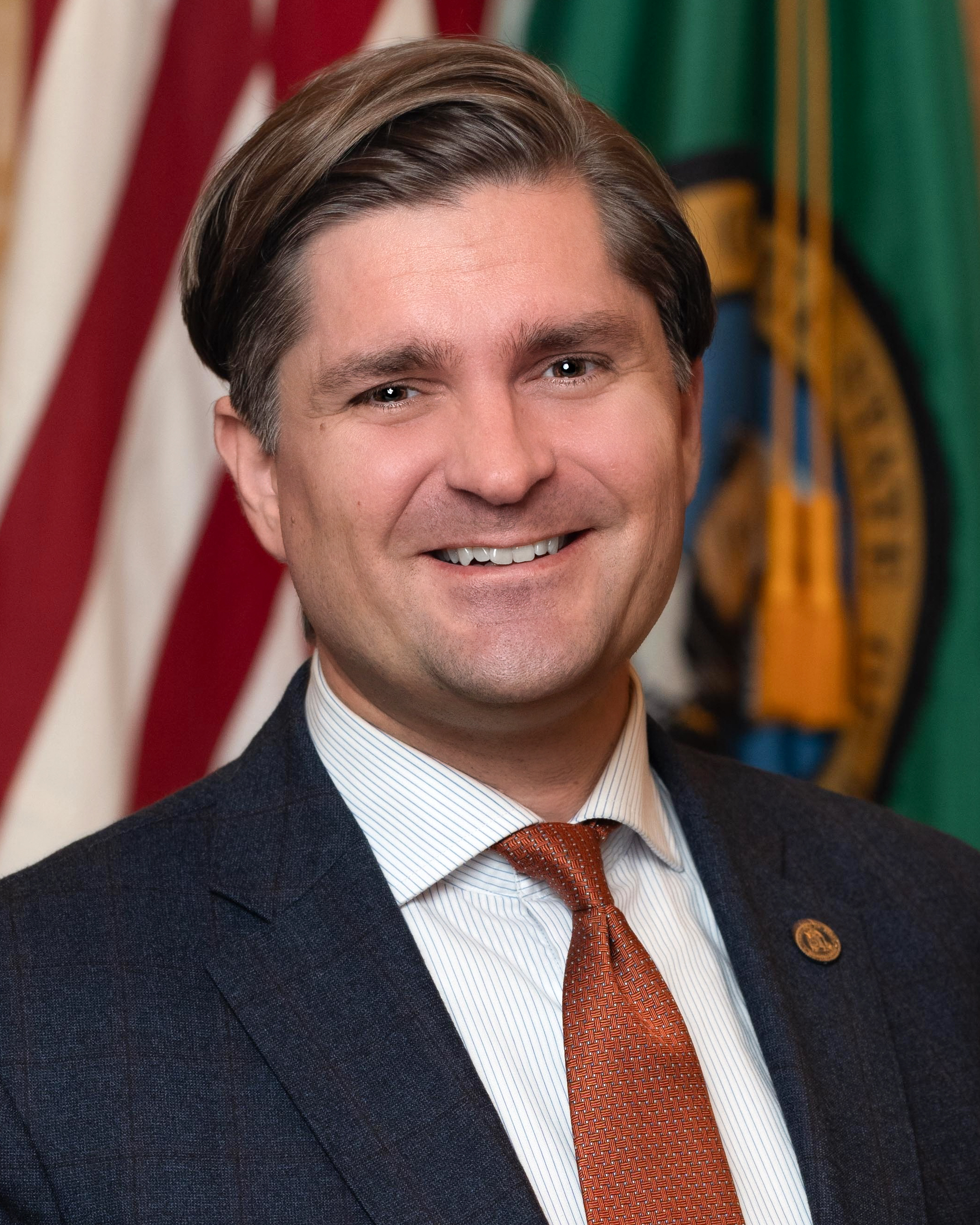

Nominee	Mike Pellicciotti	Sharon Hanek
Party	Democratic	Republican
Popular vote	2,148,764	1,600,370
Percentage	57.26%	42.65%
- Pellicciotti: 50–60% 60–70% 70–80% 80–90% >90% Hanek: 50–60% 60–70% 70–80% 80–90% >90% Tie: 40–50% 50% No votes
State Treasurer before election
Mike Pellicciotti
Democratic
Elected State Treasurer
Mike Pellicciotti
Democratic

The 2024 Washington State Treasurer election was held on November 5, 2024, to elect the Washington State Treasurer, concurrently with the 2024 U.S. presidential election, as well as elections to the U.S. Senate and various state and local elections, including for U.S. House and governor of Washington. Washington is one of two states that holds a top-two primary, meaning that all candidates are listed on the same ballot regardless of party affiliation, and the top two move on to the general election.

Incumbent Democratic State Treasurer Mike Pellicciotti was first elected back in 2020 defeating then-incumbent state treasurer Duane Davidson. He was re-elected to a second term, defeating Republican challenger Sharon Hanek.

The top-two primary was held on August 6.

== Primary election ==
=== Democratic Party ===
==== Advanced to general ====
- Mike Pellicciotti, incumbent state treasurer (2021–present)

=== Republican Party ===
==== Advanced to general ====
- Sharon Hanek, candidate for state treasurer in 2012

=== Results ===
County results Pellicciotti: 50–60%; 60–70%; 70–80%; Hanek: 50–60%; 60–70%; 70–80%

Congressional district results Pellicciotti: 50–60%; 60–70%; 70–80%; 80–90%; Hanek: 50–60%; 60–70%

Blanket primary results
Party	Candidate	Votes	%
Democratic	Mike Pellicciotti (incumbent)	1,118,500	58.32%
Republican	Sharon Hanek	797,824	41.60%
Write-in		1,684	0.09%
Total votes		1,918,008	100.00%

==== By county ====
County	Mike Pellicciotti Democratic		Sharon Hanek Republican		Write-in Various		Margin		Total
County	#	%	#	%	#	%	#	%	Total
Adams	565	23.23%	1,863	76.60%	4	0.16%	-1,298	-53.37%	2,432
Asotin	2,150	38.20%	3,469	61.64%	9	0.16%	-1,319	-23.44%	5,628
Benton	18,499	37.49%	30,802	62.42%	47	0.10%	-12,303	-24.93%	49,348
Chelan	8,787	40.65%	12,811	59.26%	19	0.09%	-4,024	-18.61%	21,617
Clallam	16,221	56.66%	12,390	43.28%	19	0.07%	3,831	13.38%	28,630
Clark	70,291	52.95%	62,343	46.96%	123	0.09%	7,948	5.99%	132,757
Columbia	336	26.62%	923	73.14%	3	0.24%	-587	-46.51%	1,262
Cowlitz	11,503	39.98%	17,239	59.92%	29	0.10%	-5,736	-19.94%	28,771
Douglas	3,350	31.03%	7,434	68.86%	12	0.11%	-4,084	-37.83%	10,796
Ferry	709	30.21%	1,637	69.75%	1	0.04%	-928	-39.54%	2,347
Franklin	4,782	34.22%	9,183	65.71%	9	0.06%	-4,401	-31.49%	13,974
Garfield	148	20.33%	579	79.53%	1	0.14%	-431	-59.20%	728
Grant	4,159	25.30%	12,268	74.63%	12	0.07%	-8,109	-49.33%	16,439
Grays Harbor	8,914	46.46%	10,256	53.46%	15	0.08%	-1,342	-7.00%	19,185
Island	16,778	56.41%	12,942	43.51%	24	0.08%	3,836	12.90%	29,744
Jefferson	11,687	74.96%	3,896	24.99%	8	0.05%	7,791	49.97%	15,591
King	405,306	75.58%	130,564	24.35%	371	0.07%	274,742	51.23%	536,241
Kitsap	50,295	60.74%	32,442	39.18%	66	0.08%	17,853	21.56%	82,803
Kittitas	4,558	38.92%	7,145	61.01%	9	0.08%	-2,587	-22.09%	11,712
Klickitat	3,260	44.26%	4,099	55.65%	7	0.10%	-839	-11.39%	7,366
Lewis	6,986	29.71%	16,485	70.11%	43	0.18%	-9,499	-40.40%	23,514
Lincoln	896	23.02%	2,995	76.95%	1	0.03%	-2,099	-53.93%	3,892
Mason	8,979	46.74%	10,197	53.08%	35	0.18%	-1,218	-6.34%	19,211
Okanogan	4,795	41.07%	6,861	58.77%	18	0.15%	-2,066	-17.70%	11,674
Pacific	3,867	48.13%	4,156	51.73%	11	0.14%	-289	-3.60%	8,034
Pend Oreille	1,459	33.11%	2,938	66.67%	10	0.23%	-1,479	-33.56%	4,407
Pierce	112,021	54.19%	94,540	45.73%	172	0.08%	17,481	8.46%	206,733
San Juan	5,858	75.68%	1,879	24.28%	3	0.04%	3,979	51.41%	7,740
Skagit	20,064	55.54%	16,049	44.43%	12	0.03%	4,015	11.11%	36,125
Skamania	1,771	44.45%	2,208	55.42%	5	0.13%	-437	-10.97%	3,984
Snohomish	116,273	59.04%	80,493	40.87%	159	0.08%	35,780	18.17%	196,925
Spokane	67,094	47.77%	73,166	52.10%	181	0.13%	-6,072	-4.32%	140,441
Stevens	4,317	28.01%	11,073	71.85%	21	0.14%	-6,756	-43.84%	15,411
Thurston	52,102	61.29%	32,817	38.61%	87	0.10%	19,285	22.69%	85,006
Wahkiakum	731	42.01%	1,007	57.87%	2	0.11%	-276	-15.86%	1,740
Walla Walla	6,254	43.26%	8,195	56.69%	7	0.05%	-1,941	-13.43%	14,456
Whatcom	42,706	60.71%	27,582	39.21%	55	0.08%	15,124	21.50%	70,343
Whitman	4,216	46.32%	4,875	53.56%	11	0.12%	-659	-7.24%	9,102
Yakima	15,813	37.74%	26,023	62.11%	63	0.15%	-10,210	-24.37%	41,899
Totals	1,118,500	58.32%	797,824	41.60%	1,684	0.09%	320,676	16.72%	1,918,008

Counties that flipped from Republican to Democratic

- Clallam (largest city: Port Angeles)
- Clark (largest city: Vancouver)
- Pierce (largest city: Tacoma)
- Skagit (largest city: Mount Vernon)

==== By congressional district ====
District	Pellicciotti	Hanek	Representative
1st	64%	36%	Suzan DelBene
2nd	61%	39%	Rick Larsen
3rd	47%	53%	Marie Gluesenkamp Perez
4th	36%	64%	Dan Newhouse
5th	44%	56%	Cathy McMorris Rodgers
6th	60%	40%	Derek Kilmer
7th	87%	13%	Pramila Jayapal
8th	51%	49%	Kim Schrier
9th	71%	29%	Adam Smith
10th	59%	41%	Marilyn Strickland

== General election ==
=== Endorsements ===
Mike Pellicciotti (D)

Newspapers

- The Seattle Times

=== Polling ===
Poll source	Date(s) administered	Sample size (Note: Key: A – all adults RV – registered voters LV – likely voters V – unclear)	Margin of error	Mike Pellicciotti (D)	Sharon Hanek (R)	Undecided
ActiVote	October 3–29, 2024	400 (LV)	± 4.9%	59%	41%	–
Public Policy Polling (D) (Note: Poll sponsored by the Northwest Progressive Institute)	July 24–25, 2024	581 (LV)	± 4.0%	43%	33%	24%

=== Results ===
2024 Washington State Treasurer election
Party	Candidate	Votes	%	±%
Democratic	Mike Pellicciotti (incumbent)	2,148,764	57.26%	+3.85%
Republican	Sharon Hanek	1,600,370	42.65%	–3.85%
Write-in		3,261	0.09%	–
Total votes		3,752,395	100.00%	N/A
Democratic hold				

==== By county ====
County	Mike Pellicciotti Democratic		Sharon Hanek Republican		Write-in Various		Margin		Total
County	#	%	#	%	#	%	#	%	Total
Adams	1,350	26.22%	3,788	73.57%	11	0.21%	-2,438	-47.35%	5,149
Asotin	3,990	36.41%	6,954	63.45%	15	0.14%	-2,964	-27.05%	10,959
Benton	36,950	38.16%	59,791	61.75%	84	0.09%	-22,841	-23.59%	96,825
Chelan	17,312	43.07%	22,850	56.85%	34	0.08%	-5,538	-13.78%	40,196
Clallam	24,732	52.88%	22,004	47.05%	33	0.07%	2,728	5.83%	46,769
Clark	138,595	52.73%	123,954	47.16%	298	0.11%	14,641	5.57%	262,847
Columbia	622	26.31%	1,738	73.52%	4	0.17%	-1,116	-47.21%	2,364
Cowlitz	22,598	39.58%	34,442	60.33%	48	0.08%	-11,844	-20.75%	57,088
Douglas	7,195	35.38%	13,121	64.51%	22	0.11%	-5,926	-29.14%	20,338
Ferry	1,250	31.41%	2,725	68.48%	4	0.10%	-1,475	-37.07%	3,979
Franklin	11,885	38.58%	18,911	61.38%	14	0.05%	-7,026	-22.80%	30,810
Garfield	313	23.89%	996	76.03%	1	0.08%	-683	-52.14%	1,310
Grant	10,473	30.09%	24,307	69.85%	21	0.06%	-13,834	-39.75%	34,801
Grays Harbor	16,689	46.05%	19,517	53.85%	35	0.10%	-2,828	-7.80%	36,241
Island	27,988	55.67%	22,230	44.22%	57	0.11%	5,758	11.45%	50,275
Jefferson	17,232	71.56%	6,838	28.40%	11	0.05%	10,394	43.16%	24,081
King	792,063	73.44%	285,635	26.48%	796	0.07%	506,428	46.96%	1,078,494
Kitsap	87,690	58.14%	63,013	41.78%	118	0.08%	24,677	16.36%	150,821
Kittitas	10,210	40.44%	15,013	59.46%	24	0.10%	-4,803	-19.02%	25,247
Klickitat	5,765	44.23%	7,260	55.70%	9	0.07%	-1,495	-11.47%	13,034
Lewis	13,918	31.97%	29,587	67.96%	32	0.07%	-15,669	-35.99%	43,537
Lincoln	1,600	23.10%	5,320	76.82%	5	0.07%	-3,720	-53.72%	6,925
Mason	16,464	46.68%	18,764	53.20%	44	0.12%	-2,300	-6.52%	35,272
Okanogan	8,410	42.19%	11,508	57.73%	15	0.08%	-3,098	-15.54%	19,933
Pacific	6,588	48.11%	7,089	51.76%	18	0.13%	-501	-3.66%	13,695
Pend Oreille	2,487	30.11%	5,761	69.74%	13	0.16%	-3,274	-39.63%	8,261
Pierce	223,588	53.11%	197,079	46.81%	333	0.08%	26,509	6.30%	421,000
San Juan	9,112	73.92%	3,198	25.94%	17	0.14%	5,914	47.98%	12,327
Skagit	35,132	52.61%	31,605	47.33%	36	0.05%	3,527	5.28%	66,773
Skamania	3,074	43.86%	3,928	56.05%	6	0.09%	-854	-12.19%	7,008
Snohomish	225,861	57.05%	169,691	42.86%	330	0.08%	56,170	14.19%	395,882
Spokane	126,880	46.05%	148,335	53.84%	310	0.11%	-21,455	-7.79%	275,525
Stevens	7,354	26.79%	20,053	73.06%	39	0.14%	-12,699	-46.27%	27,446
Thurston	92,761	58.63%	65,323	41.29%	136	0.09%	27,438	17.34%	158,220
Wahkiakum	1,184	40.53%	1,735	59.40%	2	0.07%	-551	-18.86%	2,921
Walla Walla	12,569	43.98%	16,003	55.99%	9	0.03%	-3,434	-12.01%	28,581
Whatcom	80,545	60.78%	51,900	39.16%	75	0.06%	28,645	21.62%	132,520
Whitman	10,001	51.89%	9,261	48.05%	12	0.06%	740	3.84%	19,274
Yakima	36,334	42.41%	49,143	57.37%	190	0.22%	-12,809	-14.95%	85,667
Totals	2,148,764	57.26%	1,600,370	42.65%	3,261	0.09%	548,394	14.61%	3,752,395

Counties that flipped from Republican to Democratic

- Clallam (largest city: Port Angeles)
- Clark (largest city: Vancouver)
- Skagit (largest city: Mount Vernon)
- Whitman (largest city: Pullman)

==== By congressional district ====
Pellicciotti won seven of ten congressional districts, with the remaining three going to Hanek, including one that elected a Democrat.

District	Pellicciotti	Hanek	Representative
1st	61%	39%	Suzan DelBene
2nd	60%	40%	Rick Larsen
3rd	47%	52%	Marie Gluesenkamp Perez
4th	39%	61%	Dan Newhouse
5th	43%	57%	Cathy McMorris Rodgers (118th Congress)
5th	43%	57%	Michael Baumgartner (119th Congress)
6th	58%	42%	Derek Kilmer (118th Congress)
6th	58%	42%	Emily Randall (119th Congress)
7th	85%	14%	Pramila Jayapal
8th	50.1%	49.8%	Kim Schrier
9th	69%	31%	Adam Smith
10th	57%	43%	Marilyn Strickland

== Notes ==
Partisan clients
