= 2020 Washington State Treasurer election =

- November 3, 2020
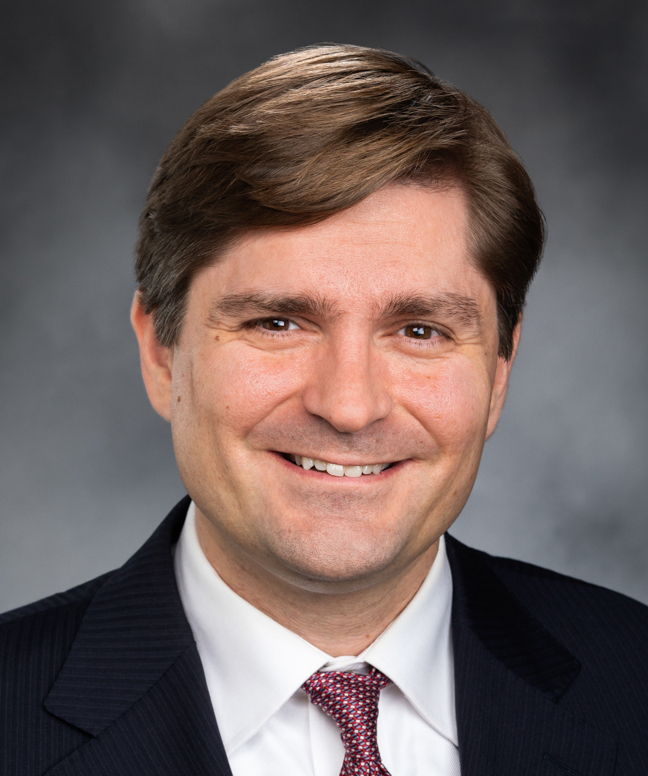

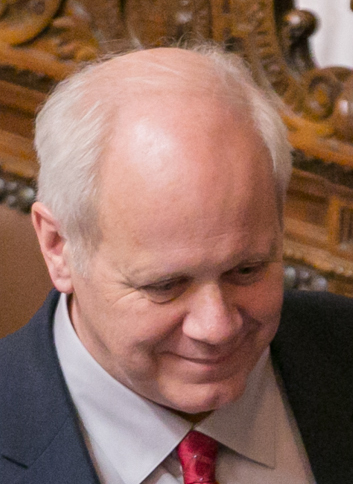
| Nominee | Mike Pellicciotti | Duane Davidson |
| Party | Democratic | Republican |
| Popular vote | 2,089,159 | 1,818,895 |
| Percentage | 53.41% | 46.50% |
- Pellicciotti: 50–60% 60–70% 70–80% Davidson: 50–60% 60–70% 70–80%
State Treasurer before election
Duane Davidson
Republican
Elected State Treasurer
Mike Pellicciotti
Democratic

The 2020 Washington State Treasurer election was held on November 3, 2020, to elect the Washington State Treasurer, concurrently with the 2020 U.S. presidential election, as well as elections to the U.S. Senate and various state and local elections, including for U.S. House and governor of Washington. Washington is one of two states that holds a top-two primary, meaning that all candidates are listed on the same ballot regardless of party affiliation, and the top two move on to the general election.

Incumbent Republican State Treasurer Duane Davidson was first elected back in 2016 defeating fellow Republican Michael Waite. Davidson lost his bid for re-election to Democratic state Representative Mike Pellicciotti.

The top-two primary was held on August 4.

== Primary election ==
=== Republican Party ===
==== Advanced to general ====
- Duane Davidson, incumbent state treasurer (2017–2021)

=== Democratic Party ===
==== Advanced to general ====
- Mike Pellicciotti, state representative (2017–2021)

=== Results ===
County results Pellicciotti: 50–60%; 60–70%; 70–80%; Davidson: 50–60%; 60–70%; 70–80%; 80–90%

Congressional district results Pellicciotti: 50–60%; 60–70%; 80–90%; Davidson: 50–60%; 60–70%

Blanket primary results
| Party | Candidate | Votes | % |
|---|---|---|---|
| Democratic | Mike Pellicciotti | 1,279,452 | 53.22% |
| Republican | Duane Davidson (incumbent) | 1,121,885 | 46.67% |
| Write-in | | 2,604 | 0.11% |
| Total votes | | 2,403,941 | 100.00% |

==== By county ====
County results
| County | Duane Davidson Republican | | Mike Pellicciotti Democratic | | Write-in Various | | Margin | | Total votes |
| County | # | % | # | % | # | % | # | % | Total votes |
|---|---|---|---|---|---|---|---|---|---|
| Adams | 2,643 | 78.52% | 719 | 21.36% | 4 | 0.12% | -1,924 | -57.16% | 3,366 |
| Asotin | 4,458 | 66.16% | 2,264 | 33.60% | 16 | 0.24% | -2,194 | -32.56% | 6,738 |
| Benton | 42,771 | 70.12% | 18,148 | 29.75% | 74 | 0.12% | -24,623 | -40.37% | 60,993 |
| Chelan | 17,279 | 63.66% | 9,834 | 36.23% | 28 | 0.10% | -7,445 | -27.43% | 27,141 |
| Clallam | 16,208 | 51.37% | 15,306 | 48.52% | 35 | 0.11% | -902 | -2.86% | 31,549 |
| Clark | 77,289 | 52.13% | 70,766 | 47.73% | 203 | 0.14% | -6,523 | -4.40% | 148,258 |
| Columbia | 1,254 | 76.51% | 383 | 23.37% | 2 | 0.12% | -871 | -53.14% | 1,639 |
| Cowlitz | 22,402 | 62.43% | 13,432 | 37.43% | 47 | 0.13% | -8,970 | -25.00% | 35,881 |
| Douglas | 9,433 | 71.68% | 3,701 | 28.12% | 26 | 0.20% | -5,732 | -43.56% | 13,160 |
| Ferry | 2,149 | 69.28% | 952 | 30.69% | 1 | 0.03% | -1,197 | -38.59% | 3,102 |
| Franklin | 12,458 | 68.37% | 5,749 | 31.55% | 14 | 0.08% | -6,709 | -36.82% | 18,221 |
| Garfield | 774 | 79.55% | 197 | 20.25% | 2 | 0.21% | -577 | -59.30% | 973 |
| Grant | 16,579 | 76.24% | 5,148 | 23.67% | 19 | 0.09% | -11,431 | -52.57% | 21,746 |
| Grays Harbor | 13,236 | 56.73% | 10,074 | 43.17% | 23 | 0.10% | -3,162 | -13.55% | 23,333 |
| Island | 17,092 | 48.55% | 18,060 | 51.30% | 55 | 0.16% | 968 | 2.75% | 35,207 |
| Jefferson | 5,448 | 32.12% | 11,464 | 67.59% | 49 | 0.29% | 6,016 | 35.47% | 16,961 |
| King | 216,417 | 30.07% | 502,607 | 69.83% | 700 | 0.10% | 286,190 | 39.76% | 719,724 |
| Kitsap | 43,836 | 46.25% | 50,867 | 53.67% | 80 | 0.08% | 7,031 | 7.42% | 94,783 |
| Kittitas | 9,916 | 63.32% | 5,734 | 36.62% | 10 | 0.06% | -4,182 | -26.70% | 15,660 |
| Klickitat | 4,903 | 60.34% | 3,215 | 39.57% | 7 | 0.09% | -1,688 | -20.78% | 8,125 |
| Lewis | 21,529 | 72.71% | 8,044 | 27.17% | 36 | 0.12% | -13,485 | -45.54% | 29,609 |
| Lincoln | 3,810 | 81.34% | 872 | 18.62% | 2 | 0.04% | -2,938 | -62.72% | 4,684 |
| Mason | 13,325 | 57.22% | 9,932 | 42.65% | 29 | 0.12% | -3,393 | -14.57% | 23,286 |
| Okanogan | 8,424 | 62.92% | 4,946 | 36.94% | 18 | 0.13% | -3,478 | -25.98% | 13,388 |
| Pacific | 4,793 | 53.06% | 4,224 | 46.76% | 17 | 0.19% | -569 | -6.30% | 9,034 |
| Pend Oreille | 3,695 | 70.46% | 1,542 | 29.41% | 7 | 0.13% | -2,153 | -41.06% | 5,244 |
| Pierce | 133,487 | 50.34% | 131,376 | 49.54% | 307 | 0.12% | -2,111 | -0.80% | 265,170 |
| San Juan | 2,381 | 27.13% | 6,390 | 72.80% | 6 | 0.07% | 4,009 | 45.68% | 8,777 |
| Skagit | 23,881 | 52.47% | 21,594 | 47.45% | 38 | 0.08% | -2,287 | -5.02% | 45,513 |
| Skamania | 2,415 | 58.21% | 1,729 | 41.67% | 5 | 0.12% | -686 | -16.53% | 4,149 |
| Snohomish | 120,252 | 47.58% | 132,267 | 52.33% | 214 | 0.08% | 12,015 | 4.75% | 252,733 |
| Spokane | 93,550 | 58.09% | 67,294 | 41.78% | 205 | 0.13% | -26,256 | -16.30% | 161,049 |
| Stevens | 13,820 | 75.98% | 4,342 | 23.87% | 28 | 0.15% | -9,478 | -52.11% | 18,190 |
| Thurston | 47,931 | 46.23% | 55,600 | 53.63% | 138 | 0.13% | 7,669 | 7.40% | 103,669 |
| Wahkiakum | 1,200 | 60.94% | 767 | 38.95% | 2 | 0.10% | -433 | -21.99% | 1,969 |
| Walla Walla | 11,851 | 61.30% | 7,463 | 38.60% | 18 | 0.09% | -4,388 | -22.70% | 19,332 |
| Whatcom | 39,495 | 43.84% | 50,535 | 56.09% | 60 | 0.07% | 11,040 | 12.25% | 90,090 |
| Whitman | 6,067 | 55.56% | 4,833 | 44.26% | 19 | 0.17% | -1,234 | -11.30% | 10,919 |
| Yakima | 33,434 | 66.11% | 17,082 | 33.77% | 60 | 0.12% | -16,352 | -32.33% | 50,576 |
| Totals | 1,121,885 | 46.67% | 1,279,452 | 53.22% | 2,604 | 0.11% | 157,567 | 6.55% | 2,403,941 |

Counties that flipped from Republican to Democratic

- Island (largest city: Oak Harbor)

==== By congressional district ====
| District | Davidson | Pellicciotti | Representative |
|---|---|---|---|
| 1st | 48% | 52% | Suzan DelBene |
| 2nd | 42% | 58% | Rick Larsen |
| 3rd | 57% | 43% | Jaime Herrera Beutler |
| 4th | 69% | 30% | Dan Newhouse |
| 5th | 61% | 39% | Cathy McMorris Rodgers |
| 6th | 46% | 54% | Derek Kilmer |
| 7th | 20% | 80% | Pramila Jayapal |
| 8th | 55% | 45% | Kim Schrier |
| 9th | 32% | 68% | Adam Smith |
| 10th | 48% | 52% | Denny Heck |

== General election ==
=== Endorsements ===
Duane Davidson (R)

Newspapers

- The Seattle Times
Mike Pellicciotti (D)

U.S. representatives

- Kim Schrier, WA-8 (2019–present)

Statewide officials

- Bob Ferguson, attorney general of Washington (2013–2025)
- Cyrus Habib, lieutenant governor of Washington (2017–2021)
- James McIntire, former state treasurer of Washington (2009–2017)

State representatives

- Debra Lekanoff, LD-40 (2019–present)

2020 Washington State Treasurer election debate
| No. | Date | Host | Moderator | Link | Republican | Republican |
| Key: P Participant A Absent N Not invited I Invited W Withdrawn | | | | | | |
| Key: P Participant A Absent N Not invited I Invited W Withdrawn | | | | | Duane Davidson | Mike Pellicciotti |
|---|---|---|---|---|---|---|
| 1 | Sep. 17, 2020 | League of Women Voters of Washington; League of Women Voters of Benton & Franklin counties The Spokesman-Review; TVW | Matt Loveless | YouTube | P | P |

=== Polling ===
| Poll source | Date(s) administered | Sample size (Note: Key: A – all adults RV – registered voters LV – likely voters V – unclear) | Margin of error | Duane Davidson (R) | Mike Pellicciotti (D) | Undecided |
|---|---|---|---|---|---|---|
| Public Policy Polling (D) (Note: Poll sponsored by the Northwest Progressive Institute) | October 14–15, 2020 | 610 (LV) | ± 4.0% | 36% | 46% | 18% |

=== Results ===
2020 Washington State Treasurer election
| Party | Candidate | Votes | % | ±% |
|---|---|---|---|---|
| Democratic | Mike Pellicciotti | 2,089,159 | 53.41% | –5.30% |
| Republican | Duane Davidson (incumbent) | 1,818,895 | 46.50% | +5.21% |
| Write-in | | 3,339 | 0.09% | N/A |
| Total votes | | 3,911,393 | 100.00% | N/A |
| Democratic gain from Republican | | | | |

==== By county ====
County results
| County | Duane Davidson Republican | | Mike Pellicciotti Democratic | | Write-in Various | | Margin | | Total votes |
| County | # | % | # | % | # | % | # | % | Total votes |
|---|---|---|---|---|---|---|---|---|---|
| Adams | 4,007 | 71.36% | 1,601 | 28.51% | 7 | 0.12% | -2,406 | -42.85% | 5,615 |
| Asotin | 7,517 | 65.38% | 3,956 | 34.41% | 25 | 0.22% | -3,561 | -30.97% | 11,498 |
| Benton | 66,762 | 67.45% | 32,144 | 32.47% | 80 | 0.08% | -34,618 | -34.97% | 98,986 |
| Chelan | 24,613 | 59.41% | 16,792 | 40.53% | 24 | 0.06% | -7,821 | -18.88% | 41,429 |
| Clallam | 24,545 | 51.70% | 22,898 | 48.23% | 33 | 0.07% | -1,647 | -3.47% | 47,476 |
| Clark | 137,152 | 52.55% | 123,559 | 47.34% | 270 | 0.10% | -13,593 | -5.21% | 260,981 |
| Columbia | 1,790 | 75.08% | 590 | 24.75% | 4 | 0.17% | -1,200 | -50.34% | 2,384 |
| Cowlitz | 35,014 | 60.66% | 22,660 | 39.26% | 44 | 0.08% | -12,354 | -21.40% | 57,718 |
| Douglas | 13,542 | 66.17% | 6,903 | 33.73% | 21 | 0.10% | -6,639 | -32.44% | 20,466 |
| Ferry | 2,810 | 67.18% | 1,368 | 32.70% | 5 | 0.12% | -1,442 | -34.47% | 4,183 |
| Franklin | 19,414 | 61.57% | 12,096 | 38.36% | 23 | 0.07% | -7,318 | -23.21% | 31,533 |
| Garfield | 1,076 | 76.91% | 318 | 22.73% | 5 | 0.36% | -758 | -54.18% | 1,399 |
| Grant | 25,666 | 70.50% | 10,703 | 29.40% | 39 | 0.11% | -14,963 | -41.10% | 36,408 |
| Grays Harbor | 20,290 | 54.80% | 16,691 | 45.08% | 45 | 0.12% | -3,599 | -9.72% | 37,026 |
| Island | 25,623 | 49.56% | 26,033 | 50.35% | 44 | 0.09% | 410 | 0.79% | 51,700 |
| Jefferson | 8,166 | 33.95% | 15,876 | 66.01% | 9 | 0.04% | 7,710 | 32.06% | 24,051 |
| King | 374,032 | 32.40% | 779,581 | 67.53% | 732 | 0.06% | 405,549 | 35.13% | 1,154,345 |
| Kitsap | 71,180 | 46.73% | 80,988 | 53.17% | 162 | 0.11% | 9,808 | 6.44% | 152,330 |
| Kittitas | 15,198 | 60.32% | 9,981 | 39.62% | 16 | 0.06% | -5,217 | -20.71% | 25,195 |
| Klickitat | 7,650 | 58.78% | 5,346 | 41.08% | 19 | 0.15% | -2,304 | -17.70% | 13,015 |
| Lewis | 30,233 | 69.23% | 13,389 | 30.66% | 47 | 0.11% | -16,844 | -38.57% | 43,669 |
| Lincoln | 5,289 | 77.97% | 1,486 | 21.91% | 8 | 0.12% | -3,803 | -56.07% | 6,783 |
| Mason | 19,863 | 55.53% | 15,853 | 44.32% | 55 | 0.15% | -4,010 | -11.21% | 35,771 |
| Okanogan | 12,182 | 59.64% | 8,225 | 40.27% | 20 | 0.10% | -3,957 | -19.37% | 20,427 |
| Pacific | 7,150 | 52.94% | 6,327 | 46.84% | 30 | 0.22% | -823 | -6.09% | 13,507 |
| Pend Oreille | 5,716 | 69.63% | 2,486 | 30.28% | 7 | 0.09% | -3,230 | -39.35% | 8,209 |
| Pierce | 219,578 | 49.32% | 225,169 | 50.58% | 422 | 0.09% | 5,591 | 1.26% | 445,169 |
| San Juan | 3,751 | 29.72% | 8,861 | 70.21% | 8 | 0.06% | 5,110 | 40.49% | 12,620 |
| Skagit | 35,562 | 51.20% | 33,812 | 48.68% | 78 | 0.11% | -1,750 | -2.52% | 69,452 |
| Skamania | 4,025 | 57.21% | 3,004 | 42.69% | 7 | 0.10% | -1,021 | -14.51% | 7,036 |
| Snohomish | 194,057 | 46.08% | 226,765 | 53.85% | 322 | 0.08% | 32,708 | 7.77% | 421,144 |
| Spokane | 159,231 | 56.48% | 122,338 | 43.39% | 353 | 0.13% | -36,893 | -13.09% | 281,922 |
| Stevens | 20,150 | 73.40% | 7,285 | 26.54% | 17 | 0.06% | -12,865 | -46.86% | 27,452 |
| Thurston | 75,332 | 46.79% | 85,506 | 53.11% | 167 | 0.10% | 10,174 | 6.32% | 161,005 |
| Wahkiakum | 1,763 | 62.21% | 1,069 | 37.72% | 2 | 0.07% | -694 | -24.49% | 2,834 |
| Walla Walla | 18,119 | 60.32% | 11,890 | 39.58% | 31 | 0.10% | -6,229 | -20.74% | 30,040 |
| Whatcom | 56,794 | 42.38% | 77,149 | 57.57% | 71 | 0.05% | 20,355 | 15.19% | 134,014 |
| Whitman | 10,384 | 51.52% | 9,743 | 48.34% | 28 | 0.14% | -641 | -3.18% | 20,155 |
| Yakima | 53,669 | 58.05% | 38,718 | 41.88% | 59 | 0.06% | -14,951 | -16.17% | 92,446 |
| Totals | 1,818,895 | 46.50% | 2,089,159 | 53.41% | 3,339 | 0.09% | 270,264 | 6.91% | 3,911,393 |

Counties that flipped from Democratic to Republican

- Clallam (largest city: Port Angeles)
- Clark (largest city: Vancouver)
- Cowlitz (largest city: Longview)
- Grays Harbor (largest city: Aberdeen)
- Mason (largest city: Shelton)
- Pacific (largest city: Raymond)
- Skagit (largest city: Mount Vernon)
- Skamania (largest city: Carson)
- Wahkiakum (largest city: Puget Island)
- Whitman (largest city: Pullman)

==== By congressional district ====
Pellicciotti won six of ten congressional districts, with the remaining four going to Davidson, including one that elected a Democrat.

| District | Davidson | Pellicciotti | Representative |
|---|---|---|---|
| 1st | 48% | 52% | Suzan DelBene |
| 2nd | 42% | 58% | Rick Larsen |
| 3rd | 56% | 44% | Jaime Herrera Beutler |
| 4th | 64% | 36% | Dan Newhouse |
| 5th | 59% | 41% | Cathy McMorris Rodgers |
| 6th | 46% | 54% | Derek Kilmer |
| 7th | 23% | 77% | Pramila Jayapal |
| 8th | 53% | 47% | Kim Schrier |
| 9th | 33% | 67% | Adam Smith |
| 10th | 48% | 52% | Denny Heck (116th Congress) |
| 10th | 48% | 52% | Marilyn Strickland (117th Congress) |

== Notes ==
Partisan clients
