= 2012 Washington gubernatorial election =

- November 6, 2012
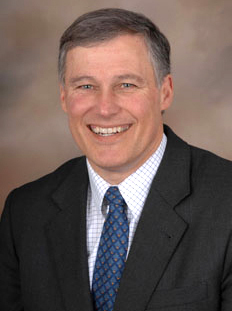

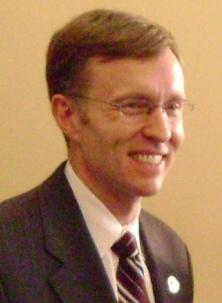
Candidate	Jay Inslee	Rob McKenna
Party	Democratic	Republican
Popular vote	1,582,802	1,488,245
Percentage	51.54%	48.46%
- Inslee: 50–60% 60–70% 70–80% 80–90% >90% McKenna: 50–60% 60–70% 70–80% 80–90% >90% Tie: 50% No votes
Governor before election
Christine Gregoire
Democratic
Elected Governor
Jay Inslee
Democratic

The 2012 Washington gubernatorial election took place on November 6, 2012. Candidates in the election were chosen in an August 7, 2012 primary election, under the state's nonpartisan blanket primary system, which allows voters to vote for any candidate running in the race, regardless of party affiliation. The two candidates who received the most votes in the primary election qualified for the general election.

Incumbent Governor Christine Gregoire decided to retire rather than seek a third term. She endorsed fellow Democrat Jay Inslee, a U.S. Congressman, as her successor. On March 20, 2012, Inslee resigned from Congress in order to focus on his gubernatorial campaign.

Inslee and Republican Rob McKenna, the Attorney General of Washington, advanced to the general election. Inslee narrowly won the election, and McKenna conceded three days later.

== Primary election ==
=== Democratic candidates ===
- Rob Hill
- Jay Inslee, U.S. Representative for WA-01 (1999–2012) and WA-04 (1993–1995)

==== Declined ====
- Lisa Brown, State Senate Majority Leader
- Dow Constantine, King County Executive
- Christine Gregoire, incumbent Governor
- Jim McIntire, State Treasurer (ran for reelection)
- Aaron Reardon, Snohomish County Executive
- Ron Sims, former King County Executive and Deputy Secretary of Housing and Urban Development
- Brian Sonntag, State Auditor

=== Republican candidates ===
- Shahram Hadian, pastor and small business owner
- Javier O. Lopez
- Rob McKenna, Attorney General of Washington
- Max Sampson

==== Declined ====
- Dave Reichert, U.S. Representative (ran for reelection)

=== Independent candidates ===
- Christian Joubert
- L. Dale Sorgen, computer programmer and former pastor
- James White

=== Endorsements ===
Rob McKenna (R)

Newspapers

- The Seattle Times

=== Polling ===
Hypothetical polling

Poll source	Date(s) administered	Sample size (Note: Key: A – all adults RV – registered voters LV – likely voters V – unclear)	Margin of error	Rob McKenna (R)	Jay Inslee (D)	Lisa Brown (D)	Dow Constantine (D)	Clint Didier (R)	Bill Bryant (R)	Brian Sonntag (D)	Aaron Reardon (D)	Undecided
Chism Strategies	June 28–30, 2011	408 (LV)	± 5.0%	20%	17%	3%	3%	3%	2%	2%	1%	49%

=== Results ===
County results Inslee: 40–50%; 50–60%; McKenna: 40–50%; 50–60%; 60–70%

Congressional district results Inslee: 40–50%; 50–60%; 70–80%; McKenna: 40–50%; 50–60%

Blanket primary results
Party	Candidate	Votes	%
Democratic	Jay Inslee	664,534	47.13%
Republican	Rob McKenna	604,872	42.90%
Republican	Shahram Hadian	46,169	3.27%
Democratic	Rob Hill	45,453	3.22%
Independent	James White	13,764	0.98%
Independent	Christian Joubert	10,457	0.74%
Independent	L. Dale Sorgen	9,734	0.69%
Republican	Max Sampson	8,753	0.62%
Republican	Javier O. Lopez	6,131	0.43%
Total votes		1,409,867	100.00%

==== By congressional district ====
District	Inslee	McKenna	Representative
1st	45%	46%	Suzan DelBene
2nd	50%	40%	Rick Larsen
3rd	33%	47%	Jaime Herrera Beutler
4th	32%	56%	Doc Hastings
5th	35%	51%	Cathy McMorris Rodgers
6th	49%	42%	Norm Dicks
7th	72%	23%	Jim McDermott
8th	40%	53%	Dave Reichert
9th	56%	37%	Adam Smith
10th	48%	43%	Denny Heck

== General election ==
=== Candidates ===
- Jay Inslee (Democratic), former U.S. Representative
- Rob McKenna (Republican), Attorney General of Washington

=== Debates ===
- Complete video of debate, October 2, 2012 - C-SPAN

=== Predictions ===
Source	Ranking	As of
The Cook Political Report	Tossup	November 1, 2012
Sabato's Crystal Ball	Lean D	November 5, 2012
Rothenberg Political Report	Tilt D	November 2, 2012
Real Clear Politics	Tossup	November 5, 2012

=== Post-primary endorsements ===
Jay Inslee (D)

U.S Presidents

- Barack Obama, 44th President of the United States

Newspapers

- The Olympian
- The Stranger
Rob McKenna (R)

U.S. Representatives

- Dave Reichert, U.S. Representative from Washington's 8th congressional district

Statewide officials

- Brian Sonntag, 9th Washington State Auditor (Democrat)

State legislators

- Mark Doumit, former state senator (Democrat)
- Tim Sheldon, state senator (Democrat)

Newspapers

- The Columbian
- The Daily News
- The Daily World
- The Everett Herald
- Kitsap Sun
- The News Tribune
- The Spokesman-Review
- Tri-City Herald
- Walla Walla Union-Bulletin
- The Wenatchee World
- Yakima Herald-Republic

=== Polling ===
Aggregate polls

Source of poll aggregation	Dates administered	Dates updated	Jay Inslee (D)	Rob McKenna (R)	Other/Undecided (Note: Calculated by taking the difference of 100% and all other candidates combined.)	Margin
Real Clear Politics	October 14 – November 3, 2012	November 3, 2012	47.3%	46.3%	6.4%	Inslee +1.0%

View source data.

Poll source	Date(s) administered	Sample size	Margin of error	Jay Inslee (D)	Rob McKenna (R)	Undecided
Public Policy Polling	November 1–3, 2012	932	± 3.2%	50%	48%	2%
KING5/SurveyUSA	October 28–31, 2012	555	± 4.2%	47%	46%	7%
KCTS 9/Washington Poll	October 18–31, 2012	632	± 3.9%	49%	46%	6%
Elway Poll	October 18–21, 2012	451	± 4.5%	45%	47%	10%
Strategies360	October 17–20, 2012	500	± 4.4%	45%	45%	10%
Public Policy Polling/WCV	October 15–16, 2012	574	± n/a%	48%	42%	10%
KCTS 9/Washington Poll	October 1–16, 2012	782	± 3.5%	48%	45%	8%
Rasmussen Reports	October 14, 2012	500	± 4.5%	47%	45%	9%
SurveyUSA	October 12–14, 2012	543	± 4.3%	47%	44%	9%
SurveyUSA	September 28–30, 2012	540	± 4.3%	48%	42%	10%
Rasmussen Reports	September 26, 2012	500	± 4.5%	46%	45%	9%
Public Elway Poll	September 9–12, 2012	405	± 5%	44%	41%	15%
Public Policy Polling	September 7–9, 2012	563	± 4.2%	48%	42%	10%
Survey USA	September 7–9, 2012	524	± 4.4%	49%	44%	7%
Survey USA	August 2–3, 2012	524	± 4.4%	48%	45%	7%
Elway Poll	July 18–22, 2012	405	± 5.0%	43%	36%	21%
Survey USA	July 16–17, 2012	630	± 4.0%	41%	42%	16%
Public Policy Polling	June 14–17, 2012	1,073	± 3.0%	40%	43%	17%
Elway Poll	June 13–16, 2012	408	± 5.0%	40%	42%	18%
Strategies360	May 22–24, 2012	500	± 4.4%	39%	43%	18%
Survey USA	May 8–9, 2012	557	± 4.2%	38%	40%	22%
Grove Insights (D) (Note: Poll sponsored by the Service Employees International Union, which supports Inslee)	March 26–28, 2012	500	± 4.4%	38%	34%	28%
Grove Insights (D)	February 21–23, 2012	500	± 4.4%	38%	38%	24%
Public Policy Polling	February 16–19, 2012	1,264	± 2.8%	42%	42%	16%
Survey USA	February 13–15, 2012	572	± 4.2%	39%	49%	12%
Elway Poll	February 7–9, 2012	405	± 5.0%	36%	45%	19%
Survey USA	January 12–16, 2012	617	± 4.0%	43%	46%	11%
Survey USA	November 21–23, 2011	549	± 4.3%	38%	44%	17%
Washington Poll	October 10–30, 2011	938	± 3.2%	38%	44%	18%
Survey USA	September 21–22, 2011	529	± 4.3%	38%	44%	18%
Survey USA	June 24–26, 2011	600	± 4.4%	47%	44%	9%
Public Policy Polling	May 12–15, 2011	1,098	± 3.0%	38%	40%	22%
Survey USA	April 27–28, 2011	610	± 4.0%	41%	48%	11%

Hypothetical polling

Christine Gregoire vs. Rob McKenna

Poll source	Date(s) administered	Sample size	Margin of error	Christine Gregoire (D)	Rob McKenna (R)	Undecided
Public Policy Polling	May 12–15, 2011	1,098	± 3.0%	40%	49%	11%
Survey USA	April 27–28, 2011	610	± 4.0%	40%	52%	7%

Christine Gregoire vs. Dave Reichert

Poll source	Date(s) administered	Sample size	Margin of error	Christine Gregoire (D)	Dave Reichert (R)	Undecided
Public Policy Polling	May 12–15, 2011	1,098	± 3.0%	45%	41%	14%
Survey USA	April 27–28, 2011	610	± 4.0%	44%	48%	8%

Jay Inslee vs. Dave Reichert

Poll source	Date(s) administered	Sample size	Margin of error	Jay Inslee (D)	Dave Reichert (R)	Undecided
Public Policy Polling	May 12–15, 2011	1,098	± 3.0%	42%	36%	22%
Survey USA	April 27–28, 2011	610	± 4.0%	44%	46%	10%

Lisa Brown vs. Rob McKenna

Poll source	Date(s) administered	Sample size	Margin of error	Lisa Brown (D)	Rob McKenna (R)	Undecided
Public Policy Polling	July 27-August 1, 2010	1,204	± 2.8%	29%	47%	24%

=== Results ===
The race was close throughout the night, with results too close to call after 60 percent of ballots were counted. Inslee was declared the winner early in the morning three days later; McKenna conceded later in the evening.

Inslee won only eight of the state's 39 counties, relying on heavy margins in the Seattle metropolitan area to push him to victory.

2012 Washington gubernatorial election
Party	Candidate	Votes	%	±%
Democratic	Jay Inslee	1,582,802	51.54%	−1.70%
Republican	Rob McKenna	1,488,245	48.46%	+1.70%
Total votes		3,071,047	100.00%	N/A
Democratic hold				

==== By county ====
County	Jay Inslee Democratic		Rob McKenna Republican		Margin		Total votes cast
County	#	%	#	%	#	%	Total votes cast
Adams	1,408	29.78%	3,320	70.22%	-1,912	-40.44%	4,728
Asotin	4,027	41.50%	5,677	58.50%	-1,650	-17.00%	9,704
Benton	27,291	34.97%	50,757	65.03%	-23,466	-30.07%	78,048
Chelan	11,616	36.41%	20,291	63.59%	-8,675	-27.19%	31,907
Clallam	17,516	46.66%	20,021	53.34%	-2,505	-6.67%	37,537
Clark	86,732	46.92%	98,131	53.08%	-11,399	-6.17%	184,863
Columbia	656	29.54%	1,565	70.46%	-909	-40.93%	2,221
Cowlitz	21,051	48.21%	22,612	51.79%	-1,561	-3.58%	43,663
Douglas	4,746	31.88%	10,139	68.12%	-5,393	-36.23%	14,885
Ferry	1,299	37.98%	2,121	62.02%	-822	-24.04%	3,420
Franklin	8,181	36.50%	14,232	63.50%	-6,051	-27.00%	22,413
Garfield	333	26.58%	920	73.42%	-587	-46.85%	1,253
Grant	8,654	31.59%	18,742	68.41%	-10,088	-36.82%	27,396
Grays Harbor	14,491	50.90%	13,978	49.10%	513	1.80%	28,469
Island	19,324	46.67%	22,082	53.33%	-2,758	-6.66%	41,406
Jefferson	12,176	62.29%	7,370	37.71%	4,806	24.59%	19,546
King	590,879	62.36%	356,713	37.64%	234,166	24.71%	947,592
Kitsap	60,578	49.72%	61,261	50.28%	-683	-0.56%	121,839
Kittitas	7,137	39.90%	10,752	60.10%	-3,615	-20.21%	17,889
Klickitat	4,442	44.07%	5,638	55.93%	-1,196	-11.87%	10,080
Lewis	11,865	35.03%	22,002	64.97%	-10,137	-29.93%	33,867
Lincoln	1,716	29.57%	4,088	70.43%	-2,372	-40.87%	5,804
Mason	13,175	47.25%	14,708	52.75%	-1,533	-5.50%	27,883
Okanogan	6,759	40.55%	9,909	59.45%	-3,150	-18.90%	16,668
Pacific	5,379	51.73%	5,020	48.27%	359	3.45%	10,399
Pend Oreille	2,442	37.06%	4,148	62.94%	-1,706	-25.89%	6,590
Pierce	164,211	48.54%	174,078	51.46%	-9,867	-2.92%	338,289
San Juan	6,763	64.82%	3,671	35.18%	3,092	29.63%	10,434
Skagit	25,878	47.33%	28,803	52.67%	-2,925	-5.35%	54,681
Skamania	2,434	45.92%	2,867	54.08%	-433	-8.17%	5,301
Snohomish	166,452	51.23%	158,440	48.77%	8,012	2.47%	324,892
Spokane	95,354	43.49%	123,894	56.51%	-28,540	-13.02%	219,248
Stevens	7,426	33.79%	14,554	66.21%	-7,128	-32.43%	21,980
Thurston	67,353	53.75%	57,948	46.25%	9,405	7.51%	125,301
Wahkiakum	964	42.83%	1,287	57.17%	-323	-14.35%	2,251
Walla Walla	9,353	38.03%	15,238	61.97%	-5,885	-23.93%	24,591
Whatcom	53,599	53.10%	47,340	46.90%	6,259	6.20%	100,939
Whitman	7,351	43.83%	9,421	56.17%	-2,070	-12.34%	16,772
Yakima	31,791	41.67%	44,507	58.33%	-12,716	-16.67%	76,298
Totals	1,582,802	51.54%	1,488,245	48.46%	94,557	3.08%	3,071,047

Counties that flipped from Democratic to Republican

- Island (largest city: Oak Harbor)
- Kitsap (largest city: Bremerton)
- Pierce (largest city: Tacoma)
- Skagit (largest city: Mount Vernon)

==== By congressional district ====
Inslee won five of ten congressional districts, with the remaining five going to McKenna, including one that elected a Democrat.

District	Inslee	McKenna	Representative
1st	48%	52%	Suzan DelBene
2nd	54%	46%	Rick Larsen
3rd	46%	54%	Jaime Herrera Beutler
4th	37%	63%	Doc Hastings
5th	42%	58%	Cathy McMorris Rodgers
6th	51%	49%	Norm Dicks
6th	51%	49%	Derek Kilmer
7th	74%	26%	Jim McDermott
8th	43%	57%	Dave Reichert
9th	61%	39%	Adam Smith
10th	51%	49%	Denny Heck

== See also ==
- 2016 Washington gubernatorial election

== Notes ==
Partisan clients
