= 2012 Washington State Treasurer election =

- November 6, 2012
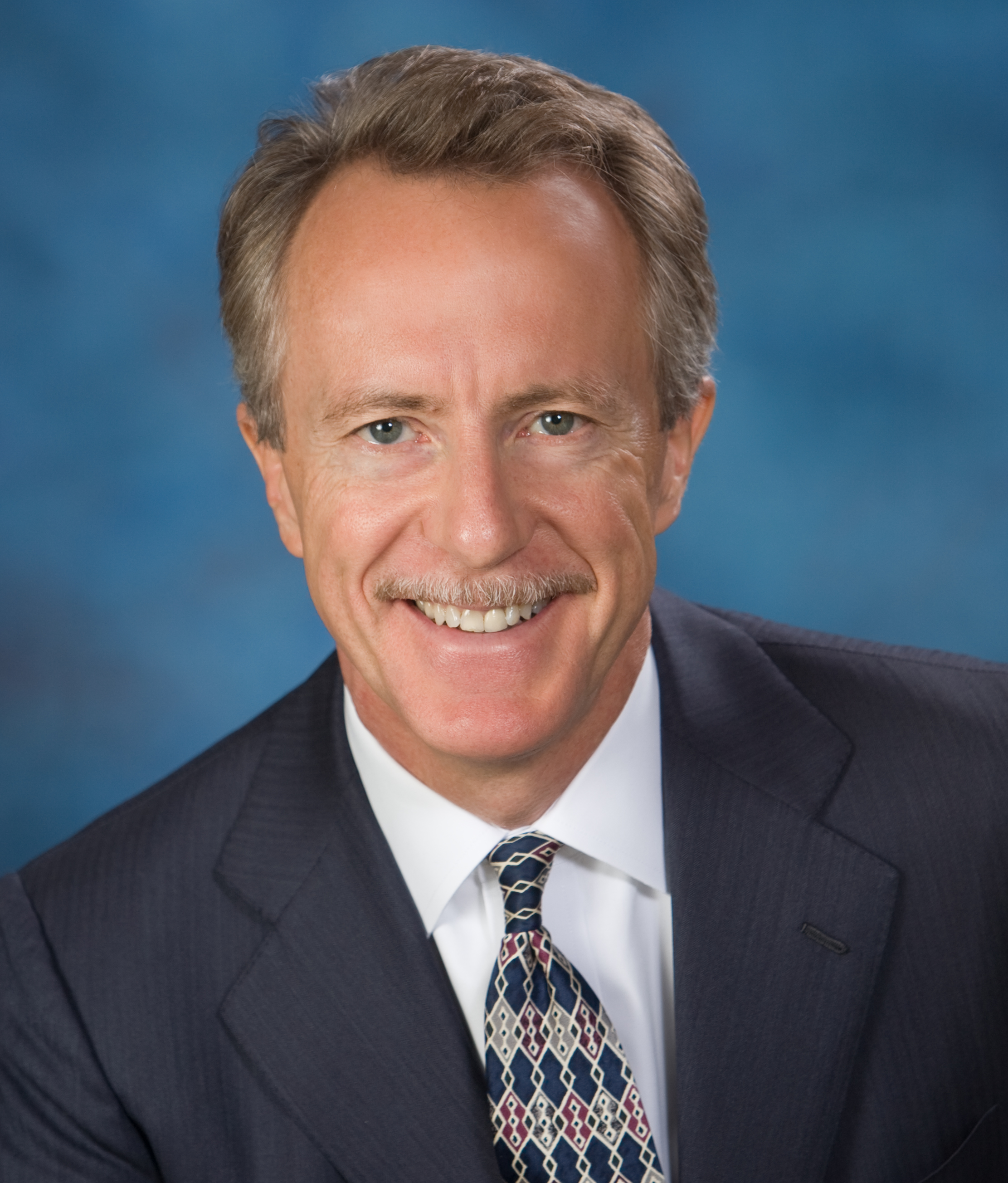

Nominee	James McIntire	Sharon Hanek
Party	Democratic	Republican
Popular vote	1,695,401	1,192,150
Percentage	58.71%	41.29%
- McIntire: 50–60% 60–70% 70–80% 80–90% Hanek: 50–60% 60–70%
State Treasurer before election
James McIntire
Democratic
Elected State Treasurer
James McIntire
Democratic

The 2012 Washington State Treasurer election was held on November 6, 2012, to elect the Washington State Treasurer, concurrently with the 2012 U.S. presidential election, as well as elections to the U.S. Senate and various state and local elections, including for U.S. House and governor of Washington. Washington is one of two states that holds a top-two primary, meaning that all candidates are listed on the same ballot regardless of party affiliation, and the top two move on to the general election.

Incumbent Democratic State Treasurer James McIntire was first elected back in 2008 defeating then-assistant state treasurer Allan Martin. He was re-elected to a second term in office, defeating Republican challenger Sharon Hanek in a landslide.

The top-two primary was held on August 7.

== Primary election ==
=== Democratic Party ===
==== Advanced to general ====
- James McIntire, incumbent state treasurer (2009–2017)

=== Republican Party ===
==== Advanced to general ====
- Sharon Hanek, CPA (write-in candidate)

=== Results ===
Results by county McIntire: 90–100%

Blanket primary results
Party	Candidate	Votes	%
Democratic	James McIntire (incumbent)	925,850	96.62
Republican	Sharon Hanek (write-in)	32,339	3.38
Total votes		958,189	100.00

==== By county ====
County results
County	James McIntire Democratic		Sharon Hanek Republican (write-in)		Margin		Total votes
County	#	%	#	%	#	%	Total votes
Adams	1,525	98.64%	21	1.36%	1,504	97.28%	1,546
Asotin	3,214	98.74%	41	1.26%	3,173	97.48%	3,255
Benton	18,507	96.09%	753	3.91%	17,754	92.18%	19,260
Chelan	10,622	97.71%	249	2.29%	10,373	95.42%	10,871
Clallam	12,639	92.19%	1,070	7.81%	11,569	84.39%	13,709
Clark	44,406	93.22%	3,228	6.78%	41,178	86.45%	47,634
Columbia	714	98.35%	12	1.65%	702	96.69%	726
Cowlitz	11,767	97.10%	351	2.90%	11,416	94.21%	12,118
Douglas	4,372	97.63%	106	2.37%	4,266	95.27%	4,478
Ferry	1,019	97.23%	29	2.77%	990	94.47%	1,048
Franklin	5,561	95.86%	240	4.14%	5,321	91.73%	5,801
Garfield	370	94.15%	23	5.85%	347	88.30%	393
Grant	7,265	95.62%	333	4.38%	6,932	91.23%	7,598
Grays Harbor	9,643	98.52%	145	1.48%	9,498	97.04%	9,788
Island	15,526	95.91%	662	4.09%	14,864	91.82%	16,188
Jefferson	8,181	98.86%	94	1.14%	8,087	97.73%	8,275
King	299,446	98.00%	6,096	2.00%	293,350	96.01%	305,542
Kitsap	40,907	97.73%	949	2.27%	39,958	95.47%	41,856
Kittitas	5,394	96.68%	185	3.32%	5,209	93.37%	5,579
Klickitat	2,574	97.61%	63	2.39%	2,511	95.22%	2,637
Lewis	9,465	94.49%	552	5.51%	8,913	88.98%	10,017
Lincoln	1,849	94.58%	106	5.42%	1,743	89.16%	1,955
Mason	10,075	94.95%	536	5.05%	9,539	89.90%	10,611
Okanogan	4,812	97.84%	106	2.16%	4,706	95.69%	4,918
Pacific	4,409	98.68%	59	1.32%	4,350	97.36%	4,468
Pend Oreille	2,130	96.51%	77	3.49%	2,053	93.02%	2,207
Pierce	101,697	97.76%	2,333	2.24%	99,364	95.51%	104,030
San Juan	3,680	92.12%	315	7.88%	3,365	84.23%	3,995
Skagit	18,569	96.16%	741	3.84%	17,828	92.33%	19,310
Skamania	1,446	96.72%	49	3.28%	1,397	93.44%	1,495
Snohomish	96,339	96.43%	3,571	3.57%	92,768	92.85%	99,910
Spokane	60,457	93.85%	3,963	6.15%	56,494	87.70%	64,420
Stevens	6,315	92.64%	502	7.36%	5,813	85.27%	6,817
Thurston	39,325	97.05%	1,194	2.95%	38,131	94.11%	40,519
Wahkiakum	784	97.76%	18	2.24%	766	95.51%	802
Walla Walla	8,241	97.86%	180	2.14%	8,061	95.72%	8,421
Whatcom	27,778	92.29%	2,322	7.71%	25,456	84.57%	30,100
Whitman	4,794	96.65%	166	3.35%	4,628	93.31%	4,960
Yakima	20,033	95.71%	899	4.29%	19,134	91.41%	20,932
Totals	925,850	96.62%	32,339	3.38%	893,511	93.25%	958,189

== General election ==
=== Endorsements ===
Jim McIntire (D)

Newspapers

- The Seattle Times

=== Results ===
2012 Washington State Treasurer election
Party	Candidate	Votes	%	±%
Democratic	James McIntire (incumbent)	1,695,401	58.71	+7.63
Republican	Sharon Hanek	1,192,150	41.29	–7.63
Total votes		2,887,551	100.00	N/A
Democratic hold				

==== By county ====
County results
County	James McIntire Democratic		Sharon Hanek Republican		Margin		Total votes
County	#	%	#	%	#	%	Total votes
Adams	1,598	35.73%	2,875	64.27%	-1,277	-28.55%	4,473
Asotin	4,104	44.64%	5,090	55.36%	-986	-10.72%	9,194
Benton	30,583	41.58%	42,972	58.42%	-12,389	-16.84%	73,555
Chelan	13,228	44.41%	16,556	55.59%	-3,328	-11.17%	29,784
Clallam	19,529	54.62%	16,226	45.38%	3,303	9.24%	35,755
Clark	93,410	52.60%	84,180	47.40%	9,230	5.20%	177,590
Columbia	749	36.43%	1,307	63.57%	-558	-27.14%	2,056
Cowlitz	22,732	54.76%	18,782	45.24%	3,950	9.51%	41,514
Douglas	5,514	39.55%	8,429	60.45%	-2,915	-20.91%	13,943
Ferry	1,368	42.64%	1,840	57.36%	-472	-14.71%	3,208
Franklin	9,119	42.34%	12,420	57.66%	-3,301	-15.33%	21,539
Garfield	410	35.25%	753	64.75%	-343	-29.49%	1,163
Grant	9,594	37.06%	16,295	62.94%	-6,701	-25.88%	25,889
Grays Harbor	16,054	59.59%	10,888	40.41%	5,166	19.17%	26,942
Island	20,902	53.49%	18,173	46.51%	2,729	6.98%	39,075
Jefferson	12,607	67.65%	6,030	32.35%	6,577	35.29%	18,637
King	619,970	70.64%	257,737	29.36%	362,233	41.27%	877,707
Kitsap	65,873	57.01%	49,674	42.99%	16,199	14.02%	115,547
Kittitas	7,851	47.49%	8,682	52.51%	-831	-5.03%	16,533
Klickitat	4,715	49.10%	4,888	50.90%	-173	-1.80%	9,603
Lewis	13,134	41.43%	18,565	58.57%	-5,431	-17.13%	31,699
Lincoln	1,995	36.35%	3,494	63.65%	-1,499	-27.31%	5,489
Mason	14,584	54.87%	11,997	45.13%	2,587	9.73%	26,581
Okanogan	7,324	46.53%	8,418	53.47%	-1,094	-6.95%	15,742
Pacific	5,696	57.70%	4,176	42.30%	1,520	15.40%	9,872
Pend Oreille	2,670	42.72%	3,580	57.28%	-910	-14.56%	6,250
Pierce	181,663	56.93%	137,436	43.07%	44,227	13.86%	319,099
San Juan	6,726	68.13%	3,147	31.87%	3,579	36.25%	9,873
Skagit	27,890	54.36%	23,413	45.64%	4,477	8.73%	51,303
Skamania	2,625	51.67%	2,455	48.33%	170	3.35%	5,080
Snohomish	178,494	58.17%	128,333	41.83%	50,161	16.35%	306,827
Spokane	102,991	49.55%	104,864	50.45%	-1,873	-0.90%	207,855
Stevens	7,989	38.11%	12,974	61.89%	-4,985	-23.78%	20,963
Thurston	72,586	61.76%	44,940	38.24%	27,646	23.52%	117,526
Wahkiakum	1,117	53.60%	967	46.40%	150	7.20%	2,084
Walla Walla	10,532	45.33%	12,701	54.67%	-2,169	-9.34%	23,233
Whatcom	54,251	56.71%	41,414	43.29%	12,837	13.42%	95,665
Whitman	7,999	50.56%	7,823	49.44%	176	1.11%	15,822
Yakima	35,225	48.33%	37,656	51.67%	-2,431	-3.34%	72,881
Totals	1,695,401	58.71%	1,192,150	41.29%	503,251	17.43%	2,887,551

Counties that flipped from Republican to Democratic

- Clallam (largest city: Port Angeles)
- Clark (largest city: Vancouver)
- Island (largest city: Oak Harbor)
- Kitsap (largest city: Bremerton)
- Mason (largest city: Shelton)
- Pierce (largest city: Tacoma)
- Skagit (largest city: Mount Vernon)
- Skamania (largest city: Carson)
- Whitman (largest city: Pullman)

==== By congressional district ====
McIntire won eight of ten congressional districts, including two that elected Republicans.

District	McIntire	Hanek	Representative
1st	55%	45%	Suzan DelBene
2nd	60%	40%	Rick Larsen
3rd	52%	48%	Jaime Herrera Beutler
4th	43%	57%	Doc Hastings
5th	48%	52%	Cathy McMorris Rodgers
6th	59%	41%	Derek Kilmer
7th	81%	19%	Jim McDermott
8th	52%	48%	Dave Reichert
9th	70%	30%	Adam Smith
10th	59%	41%	Denny Heck
