= 2016 Washington State Treasurer election =

- November 8, 2016
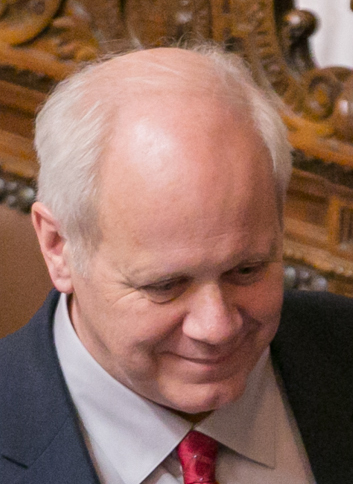

Nominee	Duane Davidson	Michael Waite
Party	Republican	Republican
Popular vote	1,576,580	1,134,843
Percentage	58.15%	41.85%
- Davidson: 50–60% 60–70% 70–80%
State Treasurer before election
James McIntire
Democratic
Elected State Treasurer
Duane Davidson
Republican

The 2016 Washington State Treasurer election was held on November 8, 2016, to elect the Washington State Treasurer, concurrently with the 2016 U.S. presidential election, as well as elections to the U.S. Senate and various state and local elections, including for U.S. House and governor of Washington. Washington is one of two states that holds a top-two primary, meaning that all candidates are listed on the same ballot regardless of party affiliation, and the top two move on to the general election.

Incumbent Democratic State Treasurer James McIntire announced on December 16, 2015, that he would not seek a third term. Republican Benton County Treasurer Duane Davidson won the election, defeating fellow Republican Michael Waite. This was the first time a Republican had been elected to the office of Treasurer of Washington since 1952.

The top-two primary was held on August 2. Since neither of the top 2 primary winners were Democrats, this is the last time King County voted Republican in a statewide election. (Note: Both the 2008 Washington Attorney General election and the 2008 Washington Secretary of State election had Republicans defeating Democratic opponents in King County.)

== Primary election ==
=== Democratic Party ===
==== Eliminated in primary ====
- John Paul Comerford, pension consultant
- Alec Fisken, former Port of Seattle commissioner
- Marko Liias, state senator (2014–present)

==== Declined ====
- James McIntire, incumbent state treasurer (2009–2017)

=== Republican Party ===
==== Advanced to general ====
- Duane Davidson, Benton County treasurer (2003–2017)
- Michael Waite, investment firm executive

=== Endorsements ===
Duane Davidson (R)

Newspapers

- The Seattle Times

=== Results ===
Five candidates ran in the primary: state senator Marko Liias, former Port of Seattle commissioner Alec Fisken, pension consultant John Paul Comerford, Benton County treasurer Duane Davidson, and investment firm executive Michael Waite. Liias, Fisken, and Comerford ran as Democrats; Davidson and Waite, as Republicans. Davidson and Waite, both Republicans, finished as the top two candidates in the primary election and advanced to the general election, marking the first time since the top-two system had been instituted that both of the primary slots in any statewide race had been won by Republicans.

County results Davidson: 20–30%; 30–40%; 40–50%; 50–60%; Waite: 20–30%; 30–40%; Liias: 20–30%; 30–40%; Comerford: 20–30%

Congressional district results Davidson: 20–30%; 30–40%; 40–50%; Waite: 20–30%; Liias: 20–30%; 30–40%

Blanket primary results
Party	Candidate	Votes	%
Republican	Duane Davidson	322,374	25.09
Republican	Michael Waite	299,766	23.33
Democratic	Marko Liias	261,633	20.36
Democratic	John Paul Comerford	230,904	17.97
Democratic	Alec Fisken	170,117	13.24
Total votes		1,284,794	100.00

==== By county ====
Combined partisan vote by county Democratic: 50–60%; 60–70%; Republican: 50–60%; 60–70%; 70–80%

Combined partisan vote by congressional district Democratic: 50–60%; 60–70%; 70–80%; Republican: 50–60%; 60–70%

County results
County	Duane Davidson Republican		Michael Waite Republican		Marko Liias Democratic		John Paul Comerford Democratic		Alec Fisken Democratic		Margin		Total votes
County	#	%	#	%	#	%	#	%	#	%	#	%	Total votes
Adams	769	43.62%	593	33.64%	93	5.28%	181	10.27%	127	7.20%	176	9.98%	1,763
Asotin	1,329	33.02%	1,131	28.10%	329	8.17%	711	17.66%	525	13.04%	198	4.92%	4,025
Benton	17,183	55.81%	5,154	16.74%	2,195	7.13%	3,633	11.80%	2,622	8.52%	12,029	39.07%	30,787
Chelan	4,672	34.79%	4,252	31.66%	1,426	10.62%	1,666	12.40%	1,415	10.54%	420	3.13%	13,431
Clallam	4,325	25.83%	4,748	28.35%	2,390	14.27%	3,106	18.55%	2,176	12.99%	-423	-2.53%	16,745
Clark	17,878	25.88%	19,042	27.57%	10,310	14.93%	12,201	17.66%	9,643	13.96%	-1,164	-1.69%	69,074
Columbia	350	37.67%	330	35.52%	79	8.50%	77	8.29%	93	10.01%	20	2.15%	929
Cowlitz	4,438	25.96%	5,239	30.65%	1,936	11.32%	3,058	17.89%	2,424	14.18%	-801	-4.69%	17,095
Douglas	2,431	38.12%	2,175	34.11%	480	7.53%	699	10.96%	592	9.28%	256	4.01%	6,377
Ferry	580	34.38%	568	33.67%	173	10.25%	189	11.20%	177	10.49%	12	0.71%	1,687
Franklin	3,665	45.29%	2,109	26.06%	620	7.66%	1,034	12.78%	665	8.22%	1,556	19.23%	8,093
Garfield	215	40.95%	175	33.33%	33	6.29%	61	11.62%	41	7.81%	40	7.62%	525
Grant	3,858	37.40%	3,681	35.68%	697	6.76%	1,220	11.83%	860	8.34%	177	1.72%	10,316
Grays Harbor	2,941	24.64%	3,292	27.58%	1,630	13.66%	2,466	20.66%	1,606	13.46%	-351	-2.94%	11,935
Island	5,066	25.46%	5,353	26.91%	2,948	14.82%	3,947	19.84%	2,580	12.97%	-287	-1.44%	19,894
Jefferson	1,772	18.58%	1,794	18.81%	2,002	20.99%	2,482	26.02%	1,487	15.59%	-480	-5.03%	9,537
King	75,630	18.48%	69,431	16.96%	123,457	30.16%	80,891	19.76%	59,928	14.64%	-42,566	-10.40%	409,337
Kitsap	12,538	24.53%	12,953	25.34%	8,580	16.79%	9,320	18.23%	7,725	15.11%	-415	-0.81%	51,116
Kittitas	2,244	31.81%	2,191	31.06%	724	10.26%	1,251	17.73%	645	9.14%	53	0.75%	7,055
Klickitat	1,469	35.30%	1,079	25.93%	424	10.19%	668	16.05%	522	12.54%	390	9.37%	4,162
Lewis	4,616	33.69%	5,053	36.88%	1,150	8.39%	1,689	12.33%	1,193	8.71%	-437	-3.19%	13,701
Lincoln	974	38.96%	936	37.44%	116	4.64%	270	10.80%	204	8.16%	38	1.52%	2,500
Mason	3,393	26.81%	3,658	28.90%	1,504	11.88%	2,307	18.23%	1,794	14.18%	-265	-2.09%	12,656
Okanogan	2,818	36.48%	1,942	25.14%	959	12.41%	1,039	13.45%	967	12.52%	876	11.34%	7,725
Pacific	1,227	24.81%	1,358	27.46%	723	14.62%	925	18.71%	712	14.40%	-131	-2.65%	4,945
Pend Oreille	985	31.86%	978	31.63%	276	8.93%	465	15.04%	388	12.55%	7	0.23%	3,092
Pierce	34,562	25.42%	36,358	26.74%	23,137	17.02%	25,469	18.73%	16,453	12.10%	-1,796	-1.32%	135,979
San Juan	777	15.99%	1,001	20.61%	1,127	23.20%	1,012	20.83%	941	19.37%	-115	-2.37%	4,858
Skagit	6,012	26.44%	6,158	27.08%	3,270	14.38%	4,170	18.34%	3,128	13.76%	-146	-0.64%	22,738
Skamania	611	29.83%	572	27.93%	238	11.62%	346	16.89%	281	13.72%	39	1.90%	2,048
Snohomish	34,000	25.07%	31,751	23.41%	32,555	24.00%	24,063	17.74%	13,269	9.78%	1,445	1.07%	135,638
Spokane	25,951	29.06%	24,338	27.25%	10,944	12.25%	14,198	15.90%	13,883	15.54%	1,613	1.81%	89,314
Stevens	3,657	36.80%	3,437	34.58%	700	7.04%	1,146	11.53%	998	10.04%	220	2.21%	9,938
Thurston	14,012	24.61%	12,712	22.32%	11,339	19.91%	9,265	16.27%	9,617	16.89%	1,300	2.28%	56,945
Wahkiakum	242	24.47%	328	33.16%	95	9.61%	171	17.29%	153	15.47%	-86	-8.70%	989
Walla Walla	3,002	28.98%	3,618	34.93%	1,156	11.16%	1,244	12.01%	1,339	12.93%	-616	-5.95%	10,359
Whatcom	10,654	23.98%	10,630	23.92%	8,596	19.35%	8,941	20.12%	5,614	12.63%	24	0.05%	44,435
Whitman	1,710	27.80%	1,841	29.93%	796	12.94%	955	15.53%	848	13.79%	-131	-2.13%	6,150
Yakima	9,818	36.50%	7,807	29.02%	2,426	9.02%	4,368	16.24%	2,482	9.23%	2,010	7.47%	26,901
Totals	322,374	25.09%	299,766	23.33%	261,633	20.36%	230,904	17.97%	170,117	13.24%	22,608	1.76%	1,284,794

Counties that flipped from Democratic to Republican

- Clallam (largest city: Port Angeles)
- Clark (largest city: Vancouver)
- Cowlitz (largest city: Longview)
- Grays Harbor (largest city: Aberdeen)
- Island (largest city: Oak Harbor)
- Mason (largest city: Shelton)
- Pacific (largest city: Raymond)
- Pierce (largest city: Tacoma)
- Skagit (largest city: Mount Vernon)
- Skamania (largest city: Carson)
- Wahkiakum (largest city: Puget Island)

==== By congressional district ====
District	Davidson	Waite	Liias	Comerford	Fisken	Representative
1st	27%	26%	18%	19%	10%	Suzan DelBene
2nd	22.6%	22%	23.0%	20%	12%	Rick Larsen
3rd	27%	29%	13%	17%	13%	Jaime Herrera Beutler
4th	44%	25%	8%	13%	9%	Dan Newhouse
5th	30%	29%	11%	15%	14%	Cathy McMorris Rodgers
6th	24%	25%	17%	20%	14%	Derek Kilmer
7th	14%	11%	39%	19%	17%	Jim McDermott
8th	29.21%	29.18%	15%	16%	11%	Dave Reichert
9th	19%	18%	28%	21%	14%	Adam Smith
10th	24.8%	25.0%	18%	18%	14%	Denny Heck

== General election ==
=== Post-primary endorsements ===
Davidson received the endorsements of every county treasurer in Washington state, both Democratic and Republican.

Duane Davidson (R)

Statewide officials

- Daniel J. Evans, former governor of Washington
- Mike Murphy, former Washington State Treasurer (1997–2009) (Democratic)
- Sam Reed, former Washington Secretary of State
- Kim Wyman, Washington Secretary of State
Michael Waite (R)

Statewide officials

- Rob McKenna, former Washington Attorney General
- Brian Sonntag, former Washington State Auditor (Democratic)

Newspapers

- The Olympian

=== Polling ===
Poll source	Date(s) administered	Sample size	Margin of error	Duane Davidson (R)	Michael Waite (R)	Undecided
Elway Poll	October 20–22, 2016	502 (RV)	± 4.5%	17%	16%	67%
Elway Poll	August 9–13, 2016	500 (RV)	± 4.5%	16%	16%	68%

=== Results ===
2016 Washington State Treasurer election
Party	Candidate	Votes	%
Republican	Duane Davidson	1,576,580	58.15
Republican	Michael Waite	1,134,843	41.85
Total votes		2,711,423	100.00
Republican gain from Democratic			

==== By county ====
County results
County	Duane Davidson Republican		Michael Waite Republican		Margin		Total votes
County	#	%	#	%	#	%	Total votes
Adams	2,466	61.02%	1,575	38.98%	891	22.05%	4,041
Asotin	4,964	58.62%	3,504	41.38%	1,460	17.24%	8,468
Benton	50,910	70.06%	21,754	29.94%	29,156	40.12%	72,664
Chelan	14,996	54.04%	12,755	45.96%	2,241	8.08%	27,751
Clallam	17,688	53.67%	15,268	46.33%	2,420	7.34%	32,956
Clark	99,385	57.60%	73,173	42.40%	26,212	15.19%	172,558
Columbia	1,251	65.50%	659	34.50%	592	30.99%	1,910
Cowlitz	20,082	51.48%	18,931	48.52%	1,151	2.95%	39,013
Douglas	7,468	56.33%	5,790	43.67%	1,678	12.66%	13,258
Ferry	1,709	55.89%	1,349	44.11%	360	11.77%	3,058
Franklin	13,253	63.75%	7,535	36.25%	5,718	27.51%	20,788
Garfield	618	56.85%	469	43.15%	149	13.71%	1,087
Grant	13,285	54.53%	11,078	45.47%	2,207	9.06%	24,363
Grays Harbor	12,566	51.75%	11,714	48.25%	852	3.51%	24,280
Island	20,594	56.16%	16,079	43.84%	4,515	12.31%	36,673
Jefferson	10,305	61.34%	6,496	38.66%	3,809	22.67%	16,801
King	490,359	60.70%	317,475	39.30%	172,884	21.40%	807,834
Kitsap	56,508	53.30%	49,511	46.70%	6,997	6.60%	106,019
Kittitas	9,635	60.77%	6,219	39.23%	3,416	21.55%	15,854
Klickitat	5,443	60.00%	3,629	40.00%	1,814	20.00%	9,072
Lewis	16,200	54.72%	13,404	45.28%	2,796	9.44%	29,604
Lincoln	3,021	59.55%	2,052	40.45%	969	19.10%	5,073
Mason	12,058	50.79%	11,684	49.21%	374	1.58%	23,742
Okanogan	7,874	55.21%	6,389	44.79%	1,485	10.41%	14,263
Pacific	4,744	54.06%	4,032	45.94%	712	8.11%	8,776
Pend Oreille	3,413	58.19%	2,452	41.81%	961	16.39%	5,865
Pierce	168,096	56.28%	130,576	43.72%	37,520	12.56%	298,672
San Juan	4,583	56.66%	3,506	43.34%	1,077	13.31%	8,089
Skagit	24,920	52.82%	22,262	47.18%	2,658	5.63%	47,182
Skamania	2,753	58.71%	1,936	41.29%	817	17.42%	4,689
Snohomish	165,574	55.24%	134,147	44.76%	31,427	10.49%	299,721
Spokane	116,043	58.39%	82,693	41.61%	33,350	16.78%	198,736
Stevens	11,514	58.05%	8,320	41.95%	3,194	16.10%	19,834
Thurston	61,579	55.89%	48,591	44.11%	12,988	11.79%	110,170
Wahkiakum	1,001	53.88%	857	46.12%	144	7.75%	1,858
Walla Walla	13,379	61.08%	8,526	38.92%	4,853	22.15%	21,905
Whatcom	60,564	64.72%	33,011	35.28%	27,553	29.44%	93,575
Whitman	8,317	57.90%	6,047	42.10%	2,270	15.80%	14,364
Yakima	37,462	56.03%	29,395	43.97%	8,067	12.07%	66,857
Totals	1,576,580	58.15%	1,134,843	41.85%	441,737	16.29%	2,711,423
