= 2008 Washington State Treasurer election =

- November 4, 2008
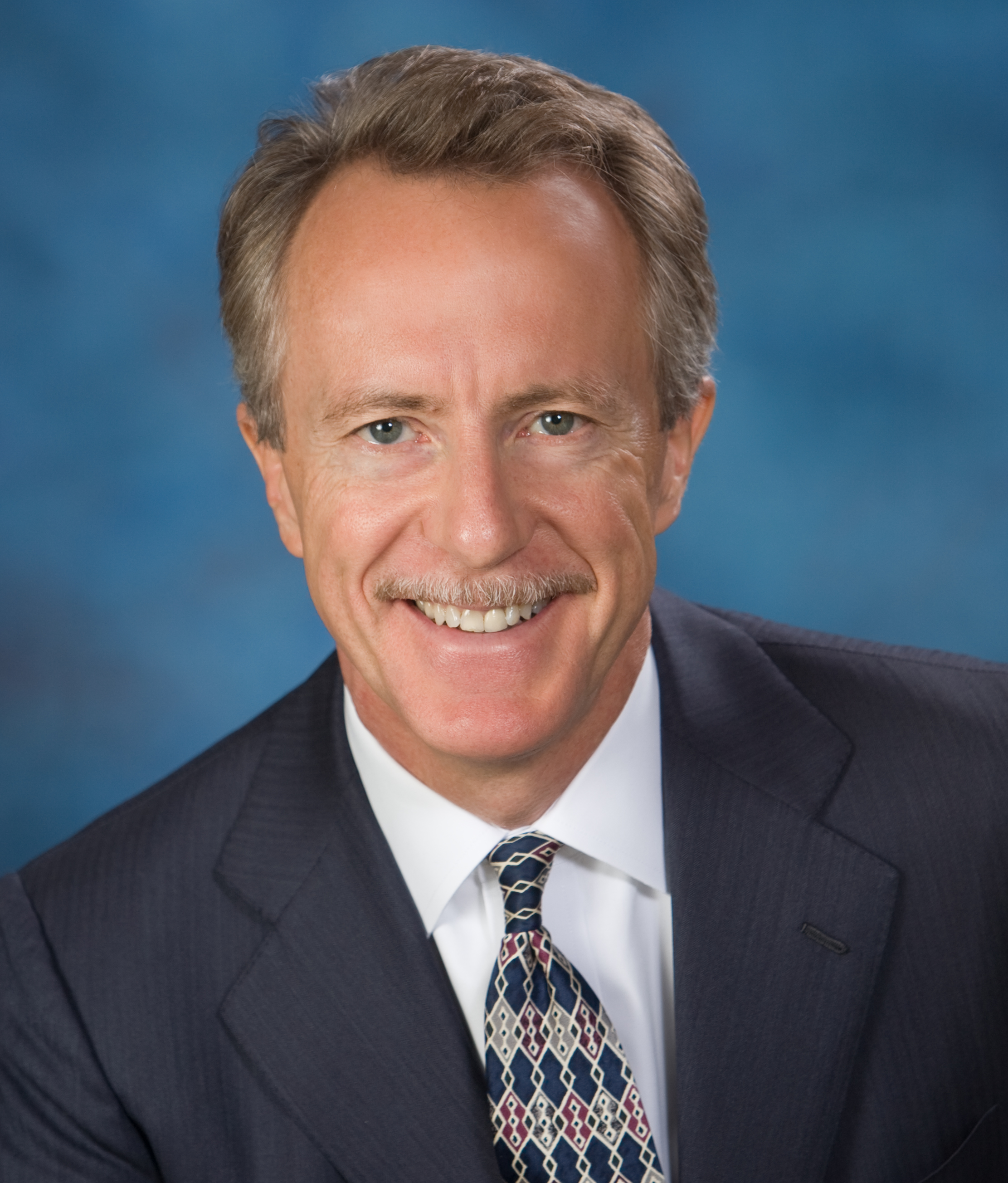

Nominee	James McIntire	Allan Martin
Party	Democratic	Republican
Popular vote	1,420,022	1,360,063
Percentage	51.08%	48.92%
- McIntire: 50–60% 60–70% 70–80% Martin: 50–60% 60–70%
State Treasurer before election
Mike Murphy
Democratic
Elected State Treasurer
James McIntire
Democratic

The 2008 Washington State Treasurer election was held on November 4, 2008, to elect the Washington State Treasurer, concurrently with the 2008 U.S. presidential election, as well as elections to the U.S. Senate and various state and local elections, including for U.S. House and governor of Washington. Washington is one of two states that holds a top-two primary, meaning that all candidates are listed on the same ballot regardless of party affiliation, and the top two move on to the general election.

Incumbent Democratic State Treasurer Mike Murphy, first elected back in 1996, retired. Democratic state representative James McIntire narrowly defeated Republican Assistant State Treasurer Allan Martin to succeed Murphy.

The top-two primary was held on August 19.

== Primary election ==
=== Democratic Party ===
==== Advanced to general ====
- James McIntire, state representative (1998–2009)

==== Eliminated in primary ====
- ChangMook Sohn, former director of the state Revenue Forecast Council

==== Declined ====
- Mike Murphy, incumbent state treasurer (1997–2009)

=== Republican Party ===
==== Advanced to general ====
- Allan Martin, assistant state treasurer

=== Endorsements ===
Allan Martin (R)

Statewide officials

- Mike Murphy, state treasurer of Washington (1997–2009) (Democratic)

Newspapers

- The Seattle Times

=== Results ===
County results Martin: 30–40%; 40–50%; 50–60%; 60–70%; McIntire: 40–50%

Congressional district results Martin: 40–50%; 50–60%; 60–70%; McIntire: 50–60%

Blanket primary results
Party	Candidate	Votes	%
Republican	Allan Martin	613,595	45.33
Democratic	James McIntire	533,443	39.41
Democratic	ChangMook Sohn	206,457	15.25
Total votes		1,353,495	100.00

==== By county ====
Combined partisan vote by county Democratic: 50–60%; 60–70%; Republican: 50–60%; 60–70%

Combined partisan vote by congressional district Democratic: 50–60%; 70–80%; Republican: 50–60%; 60–70%

County results
County	James McIntire Democratic		Allan Martin Republican		ChangMook Sohn Democratic		Margin		Total votes
County	#	%	#	%	#	%	#	%	Total votes
Adams	674	26.96%	1,656	66.24%	170	6.80%	982	39.28%	2,500
Asotin	1,944	36.99%	2,680	50.99%	632	12.02%	736	14.00%	5,256
Benton	10,544	28.02%	23,239	61.75%	3,852	10.24%	12,695	33.73%	37,635
Chelan	4,556	26.88%	10,849	64.01%	1,543	9.10%	6,293	37.13%	16,948
Clallam	7,890	36.54%	10,708	49.59%	2,993	13.86%	2,818	13.05%	21,591
Clark	27,420	37.89%	35,716	49.35%	9,231	12.76%	8,296	11.46%	72,367
Columbia	364	25.67%	923	65.09%	131	9.24%	559	39.42%	1,418
Cowlitz	9,260	43.33%	9,332	43.67%	2,778	13.00%	72	0.34%	21,370
Douglas	2,353	28.32%	5,307	63.86%	650	7.82%	2,954	35.55%	8,310
Ferry	572	29.48%	1,139	58.71%	229	11.80%	567	29.23%	1,940
Franklin	3,153	29.04%	6,729	61.98%	974	8.97%	3,576	32.94%	10,856
Garfield	203	27.28%	495	66.53%	46	6.18%	292	39.25%	744
Grant	4,360	29.92%	9,126	62.64%	1,084	7.44%	4,766	32.71%	14,570
Grays Harbor	7,531	44.80%	6,453	38.39%	2,827	16.82%	-1,078	-6.41%	16,811
Island	8,921	37.48%	11,480	48.24%	3,398	14.28%	2,559	10.75%	23,799
Jefferson	5,807	46.31%	4,611	36.77%	2,121	16.92%	-1,196	-9.54%	12,539
King	156,248	46.48%	121,741	36.21%	58,207	17.31%	-34,507	-10.26%	336,196
Kitsap	26,406	41.14%	29,170	45.44%	8,617	13.42%	2,764	4.31%	64,193
Kittitas	3,122	32.86%	5,204	54.77%	1,175	12.37%	2,082	21.91%	9,501
Klickitat	1,968	38.79%	2,600	51.25%	505	9.95%	632	12.46%	5,073
Lewis	5,665	30.14%	11,081	58.95%	2,050	10.91%	5,416	28.81%	18,796
Lincoln	1,080	29.06%	2,350	63.22%	287	7.72%	1,270	34.17%	3,717
Mason	6,692	40.37%	7,449	44.94%	2,434	14.68%	757	4.57%	16,575
Okanogan	2,672	31.49%	4,867	57.35%	947	11.16%	2,195	25.87%	8,486
Pacific	2,699	40.75%	2,483	37.49%	1,441	21.76%	-216	-3.26%	6,623
Pend Oreille	1,328	35.66%	2,048	54.99%	348	9.34%	720	19.33%	3,724
Pierce	56,085	38.88%	63,330	43.90%	24,832	17.21%	7,245	5.02%	144,247
San Juan	2,958	45.66%	2,391	36.91%	1,129	17.43%	-567	-8.75%	6,478
Skagit	11,687	39.74%	13,887	47.22%	3,833	13.03%	2,200	7.48%	29,407
Skamania	938	38.97%	1,155	47.99%	314	13.05%	217	9.02%	2,407
Snohomish	57,366	40.94%	61,841	44.13%	20,919	14.93%	4,475	3.19%	140,126
Spokane	38,057	36.52%	52,320	50.21%	13,826	13.27%	14,263	13.69%	104,203
Stevens	3,560	29.35%	7,343	60.55%	1,225	10.10%	3,783	31.19%	12,128
Thurston	21,188	33.41%	24,870	39.22%	17,360	27.37%	3,682	5.81%	63,418
Wahkiakum	455	34.24%	639	48.08%	235	17.68%	184	13.84%	1,329
Walla Walla	3,957	30.08%	7,716	58.66%	1,481	11.26%	3,759	28.58%	13,154
Whatcom	18,405	39.54%	21,217	45.58%	6,929	14.88%	2,812	6.04%	46,551
Whitman	2,541	32.10%	4,295	54.25%	1,081	13.65%	1,754	22.15%	7,917
Yakima	12,814	31.57%	23,155	57.04%	4,623	11.39%	10,341	25.48%	40,592
Totals	533,443	39.41%	613,595	45.33%	206,457	15.25%	80,152	5.92%	1,353,495

==== By congressional district ====
District	McIntire	Martin	Sohn	Representative
1st	42%	43%	15%	Jay Inslee
2nd	40%	46%	14%	Rick Larsen
3rd	37%	46%	17%	Brian Baird
4th	30%	60%	10%	Doc Hastings
5th	34%	53%	12%	Cathy McMorris Rodgers
6th	41%	42%	17%	Norm Dicks
7th	58%	22%	20%	Jim McDermott
8th	37%	48%	15%	Dave Reichert
9th	39%	43%	18%	Adam Smith

== General election ==
=== Results ===
2008 Washington State Treasurer election
Party	Candidate	Votes	%	±%
Democratic	James McIntire	1,420,022	51.08	–9.21
Republican	Allan Martin	1,360,063	48.92	+12.88
Total votes		2,780,085	100.00	N/A
Democratic hold				

==== By county ====
County results
County	James McIntire Democratic		Allan Martin Republican		Margin		Total votes
County	#	%	#	%	#	%	Total votes
Adams	1,452	32.75%	2,981	67.25%	-1,529	-34.49%	4,433
Asotin	3,954	43.58%	5,120	56.42%	-1,166	-12.85%	9,074
Benton	24,182	35.60%	43,736	64.40%	-19,554	-28.79%	67,918
Chelan	10,318	34.63%	19,477	65.37%	-9,159	-30.74%	29,795
Clallam	16,812	47.40%	18,655	52.60%	-1,843	-5.20%	35,467
Clark	83,133	49.11%	86,151	50.89%	-3,018	-1.78%	169,284
Columbia	648	31.73%	1,394	68.27%	-746	-36.53%	2,042
Cowlitz	22,517	53.99%	19,187	46.01%	3,330	7.98%	41,704
Douglas	4,755	33.60%	9,397	66.40%	-4,642	-32.80%	14,152
Ferry	1,349	42.00%	1,863	58.00%	-514	-16.00%	3,212
Franklin	6,941	37.20%	11,718	62.80%	-4,777	-25.60%	18,659
Garfield	386	31.23%	850	68.77%	-464	-37.54%	1,236
Grant	9,285	36.07%	16,457	63.93%	-7,172	-27.86%	25,742
Grays Harbor	14,995	55.32%	12,111	44.68%	2,884	10.64%	27,106
Island	17,834	46.09%	20,856	53.91%	-3,022	-7.81%	38,690
Jefferson	10,981	58.48%	7,795	41.52%	3,186	16.97%	18,776
King	482,557	58.77%	338,554	41.23%	144,003	17.54%	821,111
Kitsap	57,991	49.88%	58,268	50.12%	-277	-0.24%	116,259
Kittitas	7,021	42.59%	9,464	57.41%	-2,443	-14.82%	16,485
Klickitat	4,516	48.12%	4,869	51.88%	-353	-3.76%	9,385
Lewis	12,716	39.41%	19,547	60.59%	-6,831	-21.17%	32,263
Lincoln	1,861	34.46%	3,540	65.54%	-1,679	-31.09%	5,401
Mason	13,266	49.67%	13,441	50.33%	-175	-0.66%	26,707
Okanogan	6,713	43.48%	8,727	56.52%	-2,014	-13.04%	15,440
Pacific	5,719	56.55%	4,395	43.45%	1,324	13.09%	10,114
Pend Oreille	2,579	42.77%	3,451	57.23%	-872	-14.46%	6,030
Pierce	150,685	49.69%	152,539	50.31%	-1,854	-0.61%	303,224
San Juan	5,901	60.70%	3,820	39.30%	2,081	21.41%	9,721
Skagit	25,176	48.58%	26,652	51.42%	-1,476	-2.85%	51,828
Skamania	2,487	49.52%	2,535	50.48%	-48	-0.96%	5,022
Snohomish	150,923	50.50%	147,953	49.50%	2,970	0.99%	298,876
Spokane	95,304	47.01%	107,422	52.99%	-12,118	-5.98%	202,726
Stevens	7,777	37.85%	12,770	62.15%	-4,993	-24.30%	20,547
Thurston	59,308	51.04%	56,886	48.96%	2,422	2.08%	116,194
Wahkiakum	1,053	50.48%	1,033	49.52%	20	0.96%	2,086
Walla Walla	8,565	37.66%	14,180	62.34%	-5,615	-24.69%	22,745
Whatcom	48,798	53.03%	43,218	46.97%	5,580	6.06%	92,016
Whitman	7,281	45.57%	8,695	54.43%	-1,414	-8.85%	15,976
Yakima	32,283	44.44%	40,356	55.56%	-8,073	-11.11%	72,639
Totals	1,420,022	51.08%	1,360,063	48.92%	59,959	2.16%	2,780,085

Counties that flipped from Democratic to Republican

- Asotin (largest city: Clarkston)
- Clallam (largest city: Port Angeles)
- Clark (largest city: Vancouver)
- Ferry (largest city: Republic)
- Island (largest city: Oak Harbor)
- Kitsap (largest city: Bremerton)
- Kittitas (largest city: Ellensburg)
- Klickitat (largest city: Goldendale)
- Mason (largest city: Shelton)
- Okanogan (largest city: Omak)
- Pend Oreille (largest city: Newport)
- Pierce (largest city: Tacoma)
- Skagit (largest city: Mount Vernon)
- Skamania (largest city: Carson)
- Spokane (largest city: Spokane)
- Walla Walla (largest city: Walla Walla)
- Whitman (largest city: Pullman)
- Yakima (largest city: Yakima)

==== By congressional district ====
McIntire won five of nine congressional districts, with the remaining four going to Martin, including one that elected a Democrat.

District	McIntire	Martin	Representative
1st	51%	49%	Jay Inslee
2nd	50.3%	49.7%	Rick Larsen
3rd	49.6%	50.4%	Brian Baird
4th	39%	61%	Doc Hastings
5th	45%	55%	Cathy McMorris Rodgers
6th	52%	48%	Norm Dicks
7th	73%	27%	Jim McDermott
8th	46%	54%	Dave Reichert
9th	51%	49%	Adam Smith
