= Mike Pellicciotti =

24th treasurer of Washington

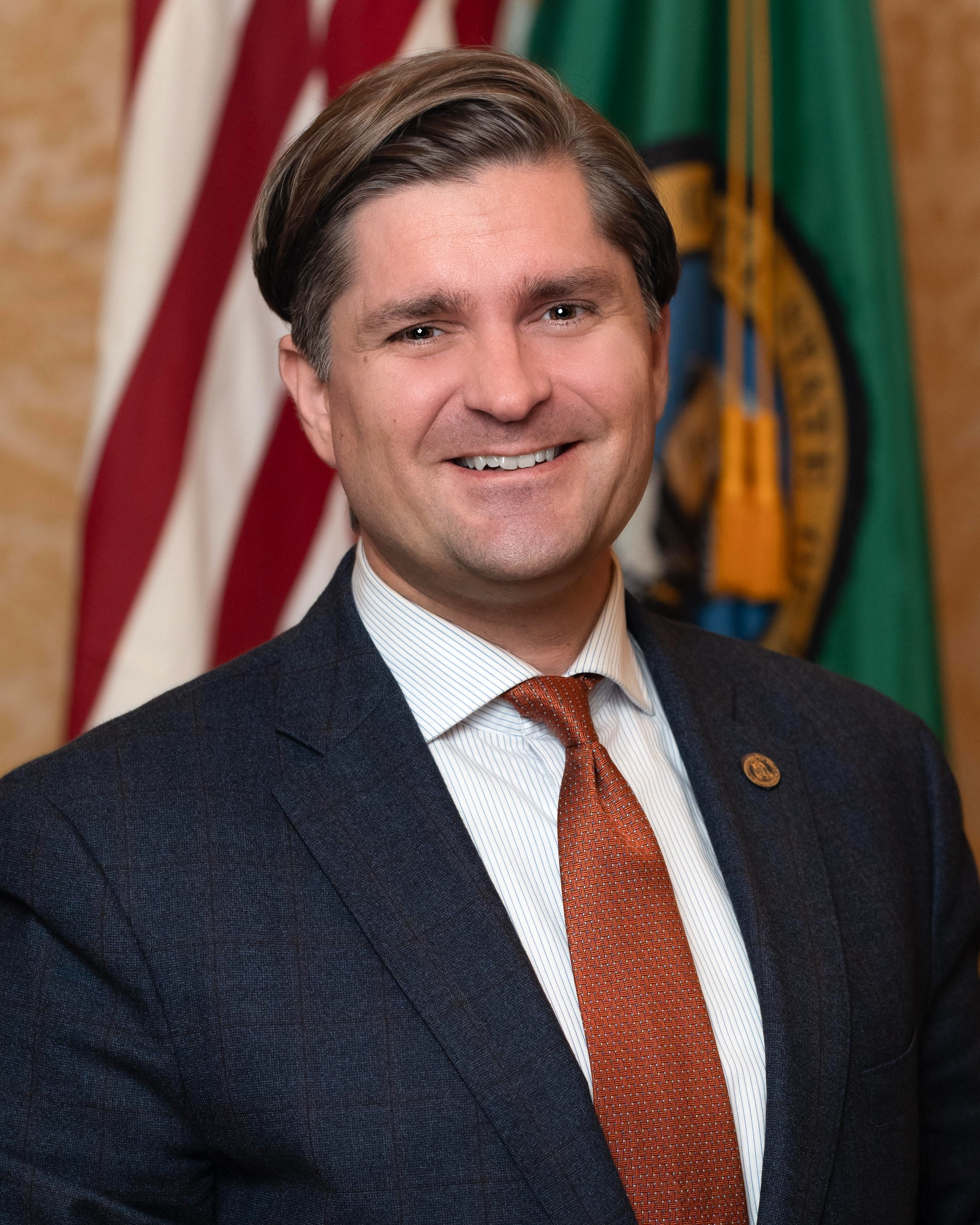

24th Treasurer of Washington
- Incumbent
- Assumed office January 13, 2021
- Governor: Jay Inslee; Bob Ferguson
- Preceded by: Duane Davidson

Member of the Washington House of Representatives from the 30th district
- In office January 9, 2017 – January 11, 2021
- Preceded by: Linda Kochmar
- Succeeded by: Jamila Taylor

Personal details
- Born: Michael John Pellicciotti; July 17, 1978 (age 48) Federal Way, Washington, U.S.
- Party: Democratic
- Domestic partner: Jaime Hawk
- Education: Alfred University (BS); Brandon University (MRD); Gonzaga University (JD)

Michael John Pellicciotti (born July 17, 1978) is an American attorney and politician who has served as the 24th Washington state treasurer since 2021. He previously served as a Democratic member of the Washington House of Representatives for the 30th legislative district, which includes Federal Way, Algona, Auburn, Pacific, Milton, and Des Moines from 2017 to 2021.

== Education ==
Pellicciotti attended Alfred University, where he was elected student body president. After college, he received a Master of Rural Development as a Fulbright Scholar at Brandon University in 2003. Pellicciotti then attended Gonzaga University School of Law, where he nationally represented almost 50,000 students as chair of the student division of the American Bar Association and led student advocacy to Congress for student debt relief.

== Legal career ==
Pellicciotti began his legal career as law clerk to Associate Chief Justice Charles W. Johnson of the Washington Supreme Court. Pellicciotti then served as a King County Deputy Prosecuting Attorney, prosecuting domestic violence and sex trafficking offenders in South King County. Attorney General Bob Ferguson appointed Pellicciotti an Assistant Attorney General to manage prosecution of corporate health care fraud and elder abuse in Washington, where he returned over $30 million to taxpayers.

== State representative ==
Mike Pellicciotti was first elected to the Washington State House of Representatives in 2016, defeating multi-term Republican incumbent Linda Kochmar by 9 points to secure a one-seat Democratic majority of the Washington State House of Representatives. President Barack Obama endorsed Pellicciotti in the campaign. Pellicciotti was re-elected in 2018, defeating former Rep. Linda Kochmar again, this time with over 60% of the vote.

Pellicciotti has rejected all corporate campaign contributions. As a legislator, he led campaign finance reforms, including passing a law to remove ”dark money” from politics. He introduced legislation to close the lobbyist ”revolving door” in Washington State, and he wrote and passed into law the Corporate Crime Act that increased penalties for corporate crimes for the first time in nearly a century. He was also the first legislator to speak out against the Legislature's attempt to hide lawmakers’ public records, while voluntarily disclosing his own.

== Treasurer of Washington ==
In May 2019, Pellicciotti announced his candidacy for Washington State Treasurer in 2020. Pellicciotti defeated incumbent Republican Duane Davidson in the general election, the first time in state history that a challenger defeated a sitting Washington State Treasurer. In 2020, Pellicciotti was the only Democratic candidate for any statewide executive office in the United States to defeat a Republican incumbent.

At 42 years old, Pellicciotti was Washington's youngest statewide elected official when he was sworn in as State Treasurer in January 2021. During his first year in office, Pellicciotti refinanced state debt to save Washington State over $370 million. He increased pension funding and returned budget reserves to pre-pandemic levels. In 2022, Washington maintained Moody's top credit rating.

Pellicciotti proposed creating a Washington Future Fund to address the wealth gap. The proposal is modeled after the Baby bonds concept that invests state money today to create future home ownership, educational, and small business opportunities two decades later when those born of limited means reach adulthood. The 2022 state budget created the Washington Future Fund Committee to examine Pellicciotti's proposal and study generational wealth inequities in the state.

After a rash of robberies of cash-heavy cannabis retailers in Washington state in 2022, Pellicciotti went to Washington D.C. to unite state treasurers and Congress in support of cannabis banking. He was a leading advocate for the Senate to pass the SAFE Banking Act in order to legalize cannabis banking in the United States.

Pellicciotti was reelected in 2024, receiving 57% of the vote against Republican Sharon Hanek.

== Electoral history ==
Washington's State Treasurer, General Election 2020
Party	Candidate	Votes	%	±%
Democratic	Mike Pellicciotti	2,089,159	53.41	
Republican	Duane Davidson (Incumbent)	1,818,895	46.50	

Washington's State Treasurer, Primary Election 2020
Party	Candidate	Votes	%	±%
Democratic	Mike Pellicciotti	1,279,452	53.22	
Republican	Duane Davidson (Incumbent)	1,121,885	46.67	

Washington's 30th Legislative District State Representative, Pos. 1, General Election 2018
Party	Candidate	Votes	%	±%
Democratic	Mike Pellicciotti (Incumbent)	28,563	61.23	
Republican	Linda Kochmar	18,085	38.77	

Washington's 30th Legislative District State Representative, Pos. 1, Primary Election 2018
Party	Candidate	Votes	%	±%
Democratic	Mike Pellicciotti (Incumbent)	15,043	58.95	
Republican	Linda Kochmar	10,474	41.05	

Washington's 30th Legislative District State Representative, Pos. 1, General Election 2016
Party	Candidate	Votes	%	±%
Democratic	Mike Pellicciotti	26,820	54.42	
Republican	Linda Kochmar (Incumbent)	22,465	45.58	

Washington's 30th Legislative District State Representative, Pos. 1, Primary Election 2016
Party	Candidate	Votes	%	±%
Democratic	Mike Pellicciotti	10,828	52.31	
Republican	Linda Kochmar (Incumbent)	9,873	47.69	

Washington House of Representatives
Preceded by Linda Kochmar	Member of the Washington House of Representatives from the 30th district 2017–2021	Succeeded by Jamila Taylor
Political offices
Preceded by Duane Davidson	Treasurer of Washington; 2021–present	Incumbent
