= Duane Davidson =

23rd Treasurer of Washington

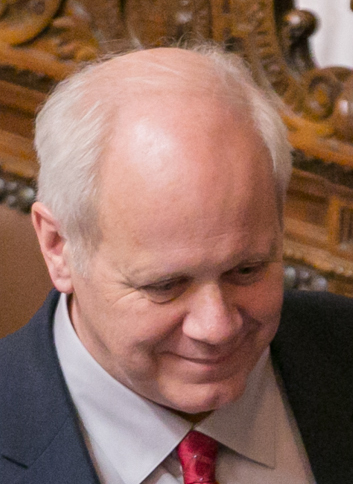

23rd Treasurer of Washington
- In office January 10, 2017 – January 13, 2021
- Governor: Jay Inslee
- Preceded by: Jim McIntire
- Succeeded by: Mike Pellicciotti

Personal details
- Born: June 6, 1959 (age 67) Carnation, Washington, U.S.
- Party: Republican
- Spouse: Kathy (died 2016)
- Children: 3
- Education: Bellevue College (AA); Central Washington University (BS)

Duane A. Davidson (born June 6, 1959) is an American accountant and politician who served as the 23rd Washington State Treasurer from 2017 to 2021. He is a member of the Republican Party.

== Early life and education ==
Davidson was born and raised in the Snoqualmie Valley near the town of Carnation, Washington, into a family involved in dairy farming, logging and other small businesses. He graduated from Tolt High School, in Carnation. He attended Bellevue Community College before earning a Bachelor of Science degree in accounting from Central Washington University in Ellensburg, Washington.

== Career ==
Davidson is an actively-licensed certified public accountant (CPA). He was elected to four terms as Treasurer of Benton County, Washington. He took that office following his initial election in 2003. During Davidson's tenure as Benton County Treasurer, available public documents show that total outstanding year-end debt dropped from $24.4 million as of December 31, 2012 to $12.6 million as of December 31, 2016.

Immediately prior to being elected as Benton County Treasurer, Duane was the Chief Financial Accountant for the county. Earlier in his career, as auditor for the Washington State Auditor’s Office, he served as the Assistant Audit Manager in the Tri-Cities in charge of the Walla Walla regional offices.

=== State Treasurer ===
Davidson was elected state treasurer by winning 58% of the statewide vote against another Republican. Davidson's youngest daughter, Grace, was his campaign manager for his 2016 election to state office. When his wife Kathy died in 2016, he contemplated dropping out of the race. Grace offered to be his campaign manager; she was 17 at the time. Duane has been vocal about the experience of having Grace run his campaign. Grace lead the Davidson campaign to victory and set multiple state records.

Davidson has said his agenda as State Treasurer includes emphasizing financial education for consumers, and particularly students. In a May 2017 visit to the Yakima area, he visited a Junior Achievement program focusing on financial education and emphasized the utility of successful learning models already in use, rather than the development of new curricula by state agencies.

Davidson has raised concerns about Washington state's total outstanding debt, and annual debt service costs. The state’s total outstanding obligations at the close of FY 2019 totaled $21.3 billion. He issues an annual report electronically by the request of the Legislature to each legislative member to provide an overview on the state's debt portfolio. While a county treasurer, Davidson served three terms as president of the Washington State Association of County Treasurers (WSACT) and earlier served as the organization’s treasurer.

Davidson lost re-election in 2020 against state Rep. Mike Pellicciotti.

=== Retirement ===
On March 2, 2021, Davidson announced his candidacy for the Washington House of Representatives in the 8th district. In March 2022, Davidson withdrew from the race to focus on his work with local nonprofits and being a father and grandfather.

In October 2022, Davidson was appointed interim County Administrator for Franklin County, Washington. He served in that capacity until March 2023, with the appointment of Michael Gonzalez.

== Personal life ==
He and his wife Kathy (deceased 2016), had three children, Bailey (Justin Young), Luke (Tanisha) and Grace (Preston). Davidson is a long-time Kiwanian. He is the past-president for two separate Kiwanis Clubs in the Tri-Cities and served as treasurer for the Kiwanis Club of Tri-Cities Industry Foundation.

== Electoral history ==
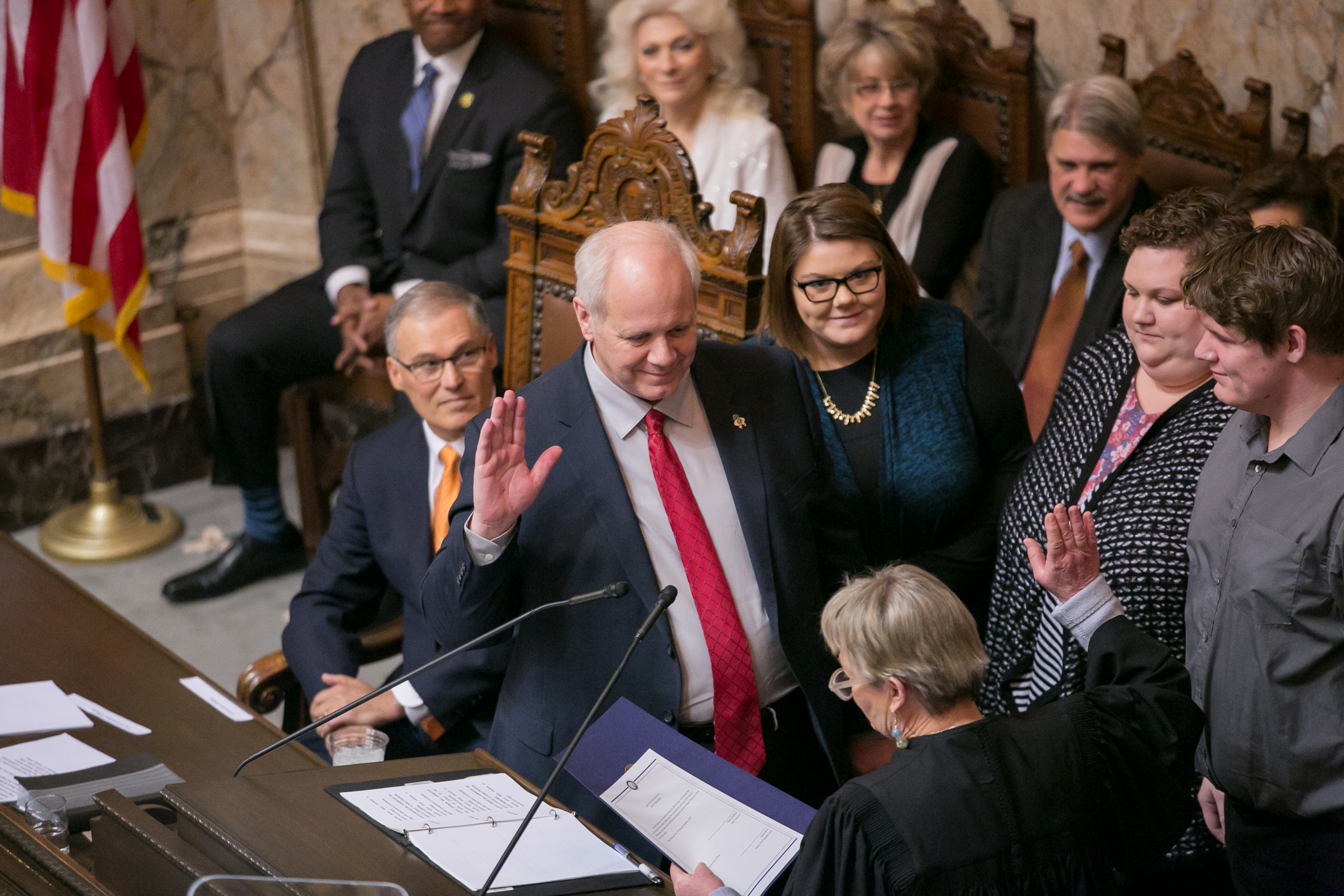
Washington State Treasurer Duane A. Davidson is sworn in before a joint session of the State House and State Senate, in January 2017.

Washington State Treasurer, 2020 Election
Party	Candidate	Votes	%
Democratic	Mike Pellicciotti	2,089,159	53.41
Republican	Duane A. Davidson	1,818,895	46.50
N/A	write-in	3,339	0.09

Washington State Treasurer, 2020 Primary Election
Party	Candidate	Votes	%
Democratic	Mike Pellicciotti	1,279,452	53.22
Republican	Duane A. Davidson	1,121,885	46.67
N/A	write-in	2,604	0.11

Washington State Treasurer, 2016 Election
Party	Candidate	Votes	%
Republican	Duane A. Davidson	1,576,580	58.15
Republican	Michael Waite	1,134,843	41.85

Washington State Treasurer, 2016 Primary Election
Party	Candidate	Votes	%
Republican	Duane A. Davidson	322,374	25.09
Republican	Michael Waite	299,766	23.33
Democratic	Marko Liias	261,633	20.36
Democratic	John Paul Comerford	230,904	17.97
Democratic	Alec Fisken	170,117	13.24

Benton County Treasurer, 2014 Election
Party	Candidate	Votes	%
Republican	Duane A. Davidson	38,215	100

Benton County Treasurer, 2010 Election
Party	Candidate	Votes	%
Republican	Duane A. Davidson	46,829	100

Political offices
Preceded by Jim McIntire	Treasurer of Washington; 2017–2021	Succeeded by Mike Pellicciotti
