= Washington's 6th congressional district =

U.S. House district for Washington

Coordinates: 47°10′N 123°30′W

- Interactive map of district boundaries since January 3, 2023 (Kitsap County and Tacoma highlighted, where most of the district's population resides)
- Representative: Emily Randall; D–Bremerton
- Population (2025): 796,477
- Median household income: $93,432
- Ethnicity: 72.5% White; 9.1% Hispanic; 7.8% Two or more races; 4.3% Asian; 3.4% Black; 2.1% Native American; 0.9% Pacific Islander Americans; 0.6% other
- Cook PVI: D+10

Washington's 6th congressional district encompasses the Olympic Peninsula, the Kitsap Peninsula, and most of the city of Tacoma. Its counties include the entirety of Clallam, Kitsap, Mason, Jefferson, and Grays Harbor counties, and part of Pierce County. The 6th district has been represented in the U.S. House of Representatives by Emily Randall, a Democrat from Bremerton, since January 2025.

Established after the 1930 U.S. census, the 6th district is a working class district, with many of its jobs provided by tourism and the timber industry on the Pacific and Juan de Fuca coasts, and by the Puget Sound Naval Shipyard in Bremerton.

Presidentially, the 6th leans Democratic. It was one of only two districts in Washington retained by the Democrats in the Republican realignment election of 1994.

Barack Obama swept the district in 2008 and 2012, with 57% of the vote each time. Hillary Clinton won the district with 52% in 2016, with a diminished, but still large, margin. Joe Biden received 57% in the district in 2020 and Kamala Harris received 58% here in 2024.

== Recent election results from statewide races ==
Year	Office	Results
2008	President	Obama 57–41%
2010	Senate	Murray 52–48%
2012	President	Obama 57–43%
2016	President	Clinton 52–40%
2016	Senate	Murray 58–42%
2016	Governor	Inslee 53–47%
2016	Lt. Governor	Habib 53–47%
2016	Secretary of State	Wyman 56–44%
2016	Auditor	McCarthy 53–47%
2018	Senate	Cantwell 57–43%
2020	President	Biden 57–40%
2020	Governor	Inslee 55–44%
2020	Secretary of State	Wyman 55–45%
2020	Treasurer	Pellicciotti 53–46%
2020	Auditor	McCarthy 57–42%
2020	Attorney General	Ferguson 55–44%
2022	Senate	Murray 57–43%
2022	Secretary of State (Spec.)	Anderson 49–47%
2024	President	Harris 58–39%
2024	Senate	Cantwell 59–41%
2024	Governor	Ferguson 56–44%
2024	Lt. Governor	Heck 56–44%
2024	Secretary of State	Hobbs 60–40%
2024	Treasurer	Pellicciotti 58–42%
2024	Auditor	McCarthy 59–41%
2024	Attorney General	Brown 56–44%
2024	Commissioner of Public Lands	Upthegrove 54–46%

== Composition ==
For the 118th and successive Congresses (based on redistricting following the 2020 census), the district contains all or portions of the following counties and communities:

Clallam County (12)

All 12 communities

Grays Harbor County (33)

All 33 communities

Jefferson County (7)

All 7 communities

Kitsap County (28)

All 28 communities

Mason County (7)

All 7 communities

Pierce County (22)

Artondale, Browns Point, Canterwood, Dash Point, Fife, Fife Heights, Fox Island, Gig Harbor, Herron Island, Home, Key Center, Longbranch, Maplewood, Milton (part; also 9th), Purdy, Rosedale, Ruston, Stansberry Lake, Tacoma (part; also 10th), Vaughn, Wauna, Wollochet

== List of members representing the district ==
Member	Party	Term	Cong ress	Electoral history	District location
District established March 4, 1933
Wesley Lloyd (Tacoma)	Democratic	March 4, 1933 – January 10, 1936	73rd 74th	Elected in 1932. Re-elected in 1934. Died.	1933–1959 [data missing]
Vacant		January 10, 1936 – January 3, 1937	74th		1933–1959 [data missing]
John M. Coffee (Tacoma)	Democratic	January 3, 1937 – January 3, 1947	75th 76th 77th 78th 79th	Elected in 1936. Re-elected in 1938. Re-elected in 1940. Re-elected in 1942. Re-elected in 1944. Lost re-election.	1933–1959 [data missing]
Thor C. Tollefson (Tacoma)	Republican	January 3, 1947 – January 3, 1965	80th 81st 82nd 83rd 84th 85th 86th 87th 88th	Elected in 1946. Re-elected in 1948. Re-elected in 1950. Re-elected in 1952. Re-elected in 1954. Re-elected in 1956. Re-elected in 1958. Re-elected in 1960. Re-elected in 1962. Lost re-election.	1933–1959 [data missing]
Thor C. Tollefson (Tacoma)	Republican	January 3, 1947 – January 3, 1965	80th 81st 82nd 83rd 84th 85th 86th 87th 88th	Elected in 1946. Re-elected in 1948. Re-elected in 1950. Re-elected in 1952. Re-elected in 1954. Re-elected in 1956. Re-elected in 1958. Re-elected in 1960. Re-elected in 1962. Lost re-election.	1959–1961 [data missing]
Thor C. Tollefson (Tacoma)	Republican	January 3, 1947 – January 3, 1965	80th 81st 82nd 83rd 84th 85th 86th 87th 88th	Elected in 1946. Re-elected in 1948. Re-elected in 1950. Re-elected in 1952. Re-elected in 1954. Re-elected in 1956. Re-elected in 1958. Re-elected in 1960. Re-elected in 1962. Lost re-election.	1961–1969 [data missing]
Floyd Hicks (Tacoma)	Democratic	January 3, 1965 – January 3, 1977	89th 90th 91st 92nd 93rd 94th	Elected in 1964. Re-elected in 1966. Re-elected in 1968. Re-elected in 1970. Re-elected in 1972. Re-elected in 1974. Retired.	1961–1969 [data missing]
Floyd Hicks (Tacoma)	Democratic	January 3, 1965 – January 3, 1977	89th 90th 91st 92nd 93rd 94th	Elected in 1964. Re-elected in 1966. Re-elected in 1968. Re-elected in 1970. Re-elected in 1972. Re-elected in 1974. Retired.	1969–1973; Kitsap and Pierce; parts of King
Floyd Hicks (Tacoma)	Democratic	January 3, 1965 – January 3, 1977	89th 90th 91st 92nd 93rd 94th	Elected in 1964. Re-elected in 1966. Re-elected in 1968. Re-elected in 1970. Re-elected in 1972. Re-elected in 1974. Retired.	1973–1983 [data missing]
Norm Dicks (Belfair)	Democratic	January 3, 1977 – January 3, 2013	95th 96th 97th 98th 99th 100th 101st 102nd 103rd 104th 105th 106th 107th 108th 109th 110th 111th 112th	Elected in 1976. Re-elected in 1978. Re-elected in 1980. Re-elected in 1982. Re-elected in 1984. Re-elected in 1986. Re-elected in 1988. Re-elected in 1990. Re-elected in 1992. Re-elected in 1994. Re-elected in 1996. Re-elected in 1998. Re-elected in 2000. Re-elected in 2002. Re-elected in 2004. Re-elected in 2006. Re-elected in 2008. Re-elected in 2010. Retired.	1973–1983 [data missing]
Norm Dicks (Belfair)	Democratic	January 3, 1977 – January 3, 2013	95th 96th 97th 98th 99th 100th 101st 102nd 103rd 104th 105th 106th 107th 108th 109th 110th 111th 112th	Elected in 1976. Re-elected in 1978. Re-elected in 1980. Re-elected in 1982. Re-elected in 1984. Re-elected in 1986. Re-elected in 1988. Re-elected in 1990. Re-elected in 1992. Re-elected in 1994. Re-elected in 1996. Re-elected in 1998. Re-elected in 2000. Re-elected in 2002. Re-elected in 2004. Re-elected in 2006. Re-elected in 2008. Re-elected in 2010. Retired.	1983–1985; Parts of Kitsap, Mason, and Pierce
Norm Dicks (Belfair)	Democratic	January 3, 1977 – January 3, 2013	95th 96th 97th 98th 99th 100th 101st 102nd 103rd 104th 105th 106th 107th 108th 109th 110th 111th 112th	Elected in 1976. Re-elected in 1978. Re-elected in 1980. Re-elected in 1982. Re-elected in 1984. Re-elected in 1986. Re-elected in 1988. Re-elected in 1990. Re-elected in 1992. Re-elected in 1994. Re-elected in 1996. Re-elected in 1998. Re-elected in 2000. Re-elected in 2002. Re-elected in 2004. Re-elected in 2006. Re-elected in 2008. Re-elected in 2010. Retired.	1985–1993; Parts of Kitsap and Pierce
Norm Dicks (Belfair)	Democratic	January 3, 1977 – January 3, 2013	95th 96th 97th 98th 99th 100th 101st 102nd 103rd 104th 105th 106th 107th 108th 109th 110th 111th 112th	Elected in 1976. Re-elected in 1978. Re-elected in 1980. Re-elected in 1982. Re-elected in 1984. Re-elected in 1986. Re-elected in 1988. Re-elected in 1990. Re-elected in 1992. Re-elected in 1994. Re-elected in 1996. Re-elected in 1998. Re-elected in 2000. Re-elected in 2002. Re-elected in 2004. Re-elected in 2006. Re-elected in 2008. Re-elected in 2010. Retired.	1993–2003; Clallam, Jefferson, and Mason; parts of Grays Harbor, Kitsap, and Pierce
Norm Dicks (Belfair)	Democratic	January 3, 1977 – January 3, 2013	95th 96th 97th 98th 99th 100th 101st 102nd 103rd 104th 105th 106th 107th 108th 109th 110th 111th 112th	Elected in 1976. Re-elected in 1978. Re-elected in 1980. Re-elected in 1982. Re-elected in 1984. Re-elected in 1986. Re-elected in 1988. Re-elected in 1990. Re-elected in 1992. Re-elected in 1994. Re-elected in 1996. Re-elected in 1998. Re-elected in 2000. Re-elected in 2002. Re-elected in 2004. Re-elected in 2006. Re-elected in 2008. Re-elected in 2010. Retired.	2003–2013 Clallam, Grays Harbor, Jefferson, and Mason; parts of Kitsap and Pierce
Derek Kilmer (Gig Harbor)	Democratic	January 3, 2013 – January 3, 2025	113th 114th 115th 116th 117th 118th	Elected in 2012. Re-elected in 2014. Re-elected in 2016. Re-elected in 2018. Re-elected in 2020. Re-elected in 2022. Retired.	2013–2023 Clallam, Grays Harbor, Jefferson, and Kitsap; parts of Mason and Pierce
Derek Kilmer (Gig Harbor)	Democratic	January 3, 2013 – January 3, 2025	113th 114th 115th 116th 117th 118th	Elected in 2012. Re-elected in 2014. Re-elected in 2016. Re-elected in 2018. Re-elected in 2020. Re-elected in 2022. Retired.	2023–present Clallam, Grays Harbor, Jefferson, Kitsap, and Mason; parts of Pierce
Emily Randall (Bremerton)	Democratic	January 3, 2025 – present	119th	Elected in 2024. Re-elected in 2026.	2023–present Clallam, Grays Harbor, Jefferson, Kitsap, and Mason; parts of Pierce

== Recent election results ==
=== 2012 ===
Washington's 6th Congressional District, 2012
Party	Candidate	Votes	%
Democratic	Derek Kilmer	186,661	59.0
Republican	Bill Driscoll	129,725	41.0
Total votes		316,386	100.0

=== 2014 ===
Washington's 6th congressional district, 2014
Party	Candidate	Votes	%
Democratic	Derek Kilmer (incumbent)	141,265	63.0
Republican	Marty McClendon	83,025	37.0
Total votes		224,290	100.0
Democratic hold			

=== 2016 ===
Washington's 6th congressional district, 2016
Party	Candidate	Votes	%
Democratic	Derek Kilmer (incumbent)	201,718	61.5
Republican	Todd A. Bloom	126,116	38.5
Total votes		327,834	100.0
Democratic hold			

=== 2018 ===
Washington's 6th congressional district, 2018
Party	Candidate	Votes	%
Democratic	Derek Kilmer (incumbent)	206,409	63.9
Republican	Douglas Dightman	116,677	36.1
Total votes		323,086	100.0
Democratic hold			

=== 2020 ===
Washington's 6th congressional district, 2020
Party	Candidate	Votes	%
Democratic	Derek Kilmer (incumbent)	247,429	59.3
Republican	Elizabeth Kreiselmaier	168,783	40.5
Write-in		1,004	0.2
Total votes		417,216	100.0
Democratic hold			

=== 2022 ===
Washington's 6th congressional district, 2022
Party	Candidate	Votes	%
Democratic	Derek Kilmer (incumbent)	208,710	60.0
Republican	Elizabeth Kreiselmaier	138,754	39.9
Write-in		409	0.1
Total votes		347,873	100.0
Democratic hold			

=== 2024 ===
Washington's 6th congressional district, 2024
Party	Candidate	Votes	%
Democratic	Emily Randall	239,687	56.7
Republican	Drew MacEwen	182,182	43.1
Write-in		753	0.2
Total votes		422,622	100.0
Democratic hold			

== Historical district boundaries ==
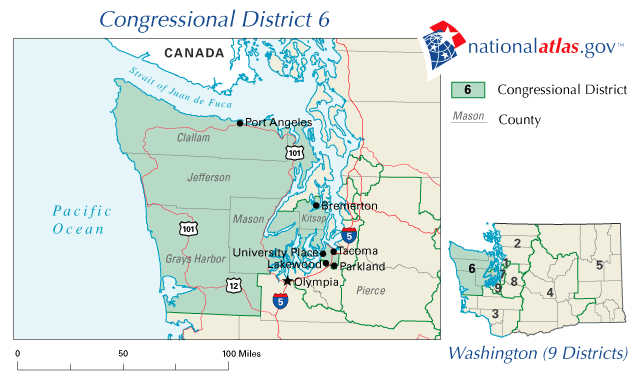
The district from 2003 to 2013

The district from 2013 to 2023

== See also ==
- United States House of Representatives elections in Washington, 2008
- United States House of Representatives elections in Washington, 2010
- United States House of Representatives elections in Washington, 2012
