= James McIntire (politician) =

American politician (1953–2024)

Jim McIntire
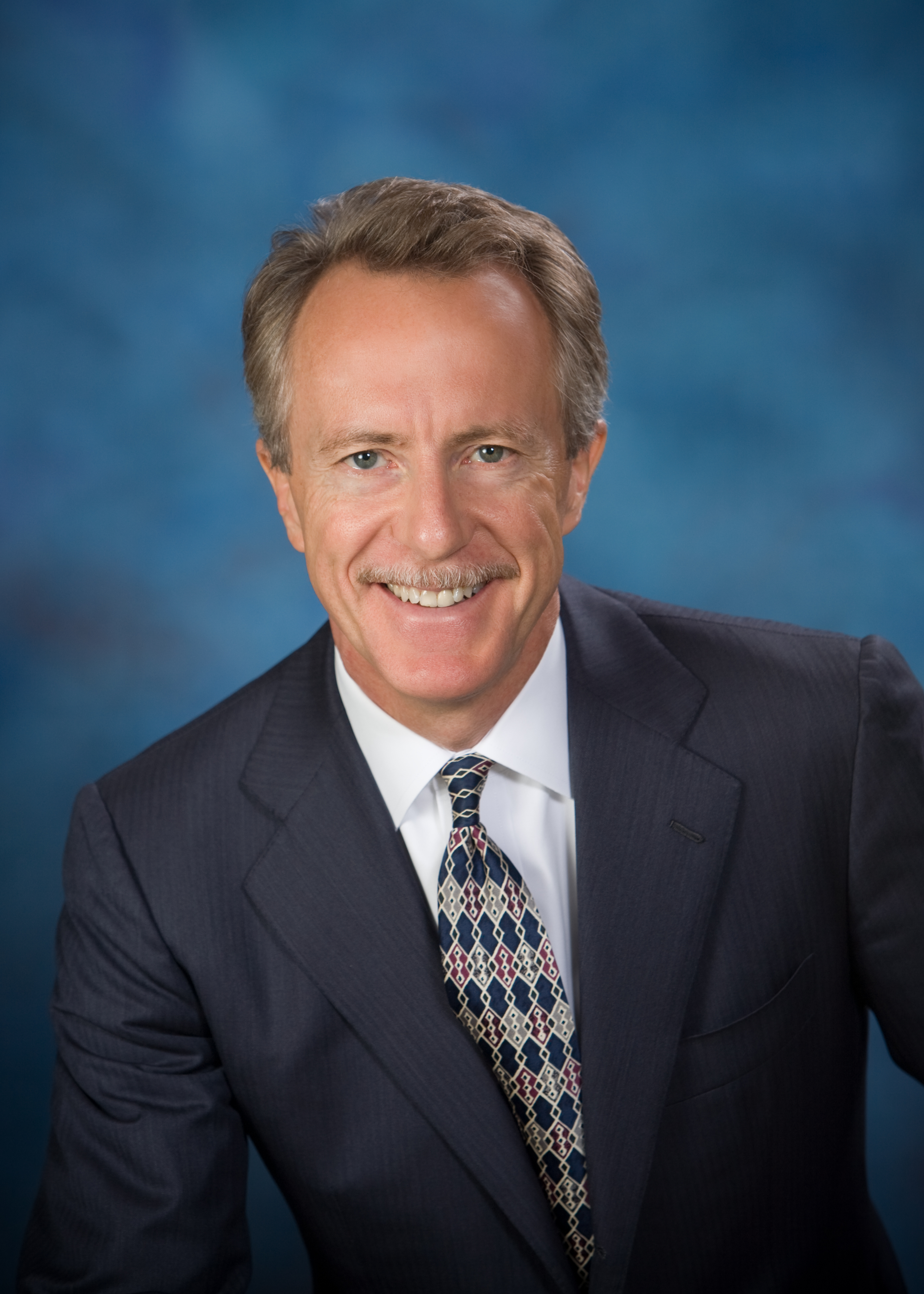
- Official portrait, 2009

22nd Treasurer of Washington
- In office January 14, 2009 – January 10, 2017
- Governor: Christine Gregoire; Jay Inslee
- Preceded by: Mike Murphy
- Succeeded by: Duane Davidson

Member of the Washington House of Representatives from the 46th district
- In office December 3, 1998 – January 12, 2009
- Preceded by: Brian Peyton
- Succeeded by: Scott White

Personal details
- Born: James Leonard McIntire; April 9, 1953 Bluffton, Ohio, U.S.
- Died: August 16, 2024 (aged 71)
- Party: Democratic
- Spouse: Christina Koons
- Education: Macalester College (BA); University of Michigan, Ann Arbor (MA); University of Washington, Seattle (PhD)

James Leonard McIntire (April 9, 1953 – August 16, 2024) was an American economist and politician who served as the 22nd Washington State Treasurer from 2009 to 2017. A member of the Democratic Party, he previously served as a member of the Washington State House of Representatives, representing the 46th district from 1998 to 2009.

== Life, education and early career ==
Born in Bluffton, Ohio, McIntire attended Macalester College, graduating with his Bachelor of Arts in urban and regional affairs, in 1976. He received his Master of Arts in public policy from the University of Michigan, in 1978. McIntire also later attended the University of Washington, receiving his Ph.D. in economics, in 1993.

McIntire started his career working as an economist for the United States Congress Joint Economic Committee, from 1977 to 1980, for former Vice President and then Senator Hubert Humphrey. From 1980 to 1981, he worked as an economist for the United States Senate Committee on Health, Education, Labor, and Pensions, before briefly working as a special legislative assistant for California Congressman Augustus F. Hawkins, in 1981. McIntire was hired as a research scientist for the Battelle Human Affairs Research Center in 1983, before reentering politics; working as a special assistant for fiscal policy for former Washington governor Booth Gardner, from 1985 to 1987. He joined the University of Washington, as a senior lecturer at the Daniel J. Evans School of Public Affairs in 1987. From 1990 to 1996, McIntire served on the board of directors and as the chairman of Common Cause, a nonprofit housing development foundation; in 1993 he was appointed director of the Fiscal Policy Center at the University of Washington, and was appointed to serve as chairman of the Washington Community Economic Revitalization Board in 1994, holding both positions until 1998. McIntire died on August 16, 2024, at the age of 71 from prostate cancer.

== Washington House of Representatives ==
=== Elections ===
McIntire served five terms in the Washington House of Representatives, representing Washington's 46th legislative district from 1998 to 2009. After Governor Gary Locke appointed incumbent Democratic state representative Marlin J. Appelwick to serve on the Washington Court of Appeals in 1998, McIntire ran for the open seat. He defeated Republican Nick Slepko and Reform Party candidate A.J. Skurdal; receiving 77% of the vote. In 2000, he defeated Libertarian John Sample, and was uncontested in the general in 2002. McIntire continued to win reelection in 2004, and 2006.

=== Committees ===
During his tenure in the Washington House McIntire served on the House Economic and Revenue Forecast Council, and the House Caseload Forecast Council. McIntire also served on the committees for:

- Finance (chairman)
- Legislative Evaluation and Accountability Program
- Joint Administrative Rules Review
- Capital Budget
- Financial Institutions, Housing & Insurance
- Appropriations

== Washington State Treasurer ==
McIntire ran for the Democratic nomination for State Treasurer of Washington in 2008, after 12-year incumbent Mike Murphy retired. He ran against Republican Assistant Washington State Treasurer, Allan Martin in the general election. Martin significantly outspent McIntire by a two-to-one margin during the campaign, and saw key endorsements from outgoing State Treasurer Mike Murphy, and the Seattle Times. However, on election day, McIntire defeated Martin in the general election with 51.08% of the vote.

In 2012, McIntire ran for reelection against Republican Sharon Hanek, a self-employed accountant. Hanek, who failed to get on the ballot officially as a Republican, ran as a write-in candidate. On November 6, 2012, McIntire won in the general election, receiving 58% of the vote, to Hanek's 41%.

== Electoral history ==
Washington House of Representatives 46th District Position 1 Democratic Primary Election, 1998
Party	Candidate	Votes	%
Democratic	Jim McIntire	10,176	66.01
Democratic	Brian Peyton	5,240	33.99

Washington House of Representatives 46th District Position 1 Election, 1998
Party	Candidate	Votes	%
Democratic	Jim McIntire	32,925	76.91
Republican	Nick Slepko	8,622	20.14
Reform	A.J. Skurdal	1,261	2.95

Washington House of Representatives 46th District Position 1 Election, 2000
Party	Candidate	Votes	%
Democratic	Jim McIntire (inc.)	40,193	86.05
Libertarian	John Sample	4,471	9.57
Natural Law	Pennie Stasik O'Grady	2,044	4.38

Washington House of Representatives 46th District Position 1 Election, 2002
Party	Candidate	Votes	%
Democratic	James McIntire (inc.)	30,258	100.00

Washington House of Representatives 46th District Position 1 Election, 2004
Party	Candidate	Votes	%
Democratic	Jim McIntire (inc.)	44,410	71.83
Republican	Brien Downie	10,438	16.88
Green	Chris LaRoche	5,700	9.22
Libertarian	Mack Barnette	1,280	2.07

Washington House of Representatives 46th District Position 1 Election, 2006
Party	Candidate	Votes	%
Democratic	James McIntire (inc.)	41,042	83.68
Republican	September Secrist	8,003	16.32

Washington Treasurer Primary Election, 2008
Party	Candidate	Votes	%
Republican	Allan Martin	613,595	45.33
Democratic	Jim McIntire	533,443	39.41
Democratic	ChangMook Sohn	206,457	15.25

Washington Treasurer Election, 2008
Party	Candidate	Votes	%
Democratic	Jim McIntire	1,420,022	51.08
Republican	Allan Martin	1,360,063	48.92

Washington Treasurer Primary Election, 2012
Party	Candidate	Votes	%
Democratic	Jim McIntire (inc.)	925,850	96.62
Republican/Write-in	Sharon Hanek	32,339	3.38

Washington Treasurer Election, 2012
Party	Candidate	Votes	%
Democratic	Jim McIntire (inc.)	1,695,401	58.71
Republican	Sharon Hanek	1,192,150	41.29

Political offices
Preceded by Mike Murphy	Treasurer of Washington; 2009–2017	Succeeded by Duane Davidson
