= Washington State Treasurer =

Elected official in the US state of Washington

State Treasurer of Washington
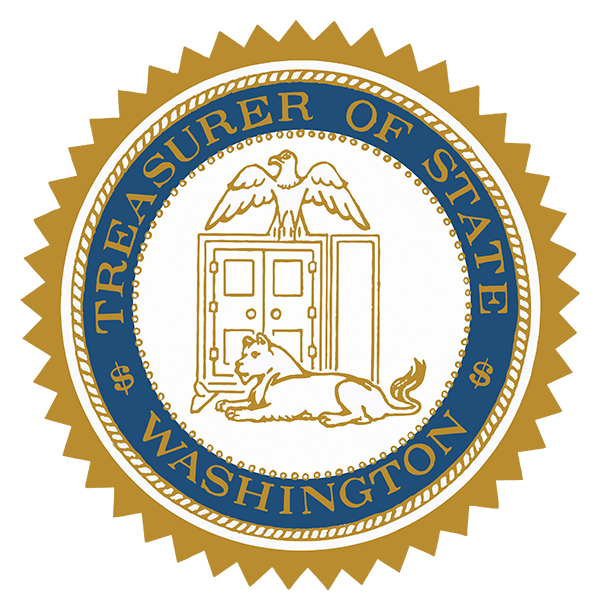
- Seal of the treasurer of the State of Washington

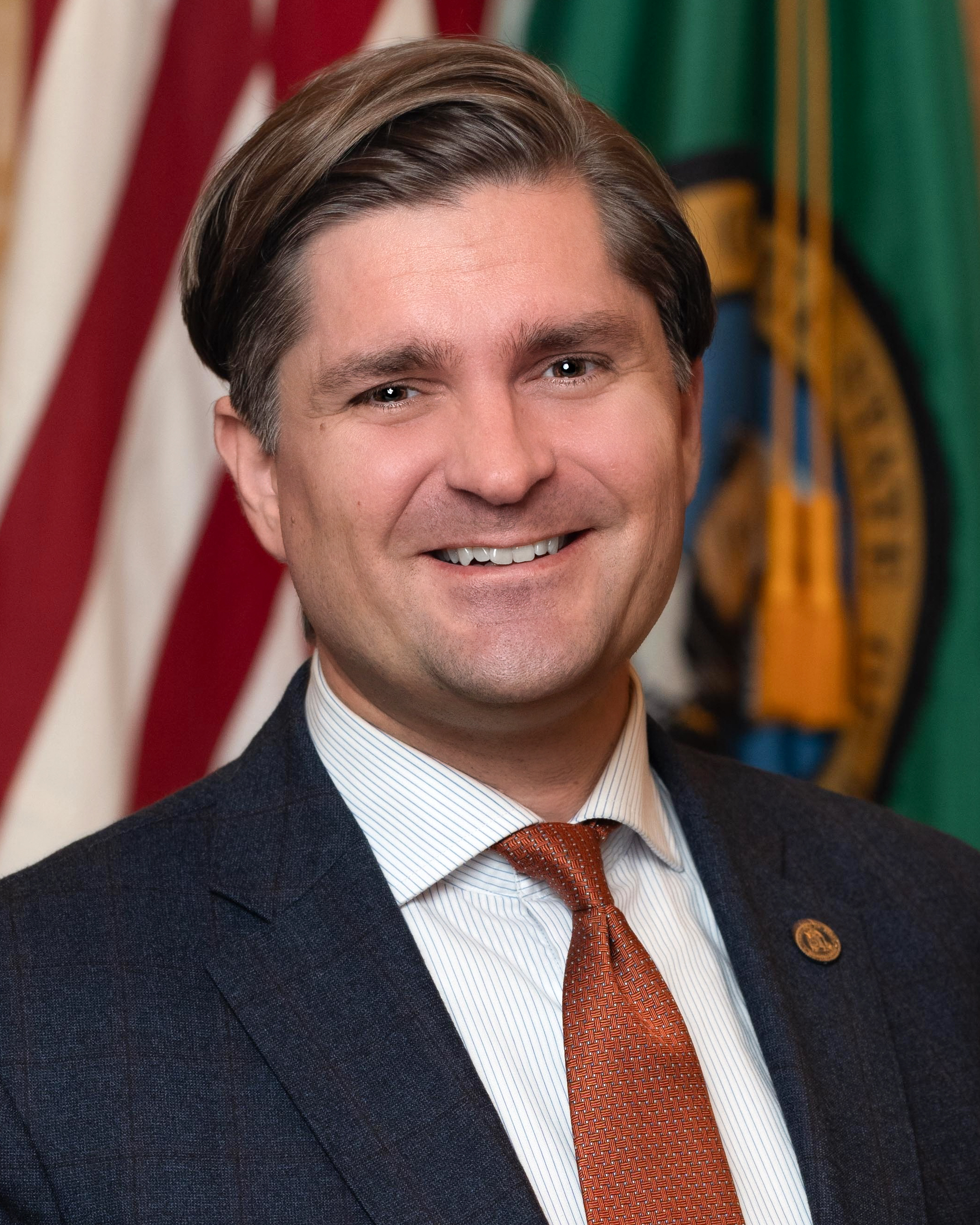
- Incumbent; Mike Pellicciotti since January 13, 2021
- Style: Mr. or Madam Treasurer (informal); The Honorable (formal)
- Seat: Washington State Capitol; Olympia, Washington
- Appointer: General election
- Term length: Four years, no term limits
- Constituting instrument: Washington Constitution of 1889: Article III, Sections 1, 3, 10, 19, 24, and 25; Article VIII, Section 1; and Article V, Section 2
- Inaugural holder: Addison Alexander Lindsley
- Formation: November 11, 1889 (136 years ago)
- Salary: $172,455
- Website: Official page

The Washington state treasurer is an elected constitutional officer in the executive branch of the U.S. state of Washington. Twenty-two individuals have held the office since statehood. The incumbent is Mike Pellicciotti, a Democrat who began his term in January 2021. The treasurer's office is located in the Washington State Capitol.

== Powers and duties ==
The state treasurer is the chief banker, financier, and investment officer for the state of Washington. In this capacity, the state treasurer receives payments made to the state, accounts for and manages the state's cash flows, and disburses public monies in redemption of warrants drawn by state agencies. The state treasurer is also responsible for issuing, registering, and servicing Washington State's $22.4 billion in outstanding debt. Likewise, the state treasurer directs and administers the investment of the state's operating funds and local government investment pool which, as of 2024, totaled approximately $41.816 billion in average daily balances. In addition to these routine functions, the state treasurer is concurrently an ex officio member of the State Investment Board (WSIB), an independent state agency that oversees the investment of Washington's pension, permanent, and trust funds. WSIB's assets under management totaled $197.3 billion at the close of the 2023 calendar year.

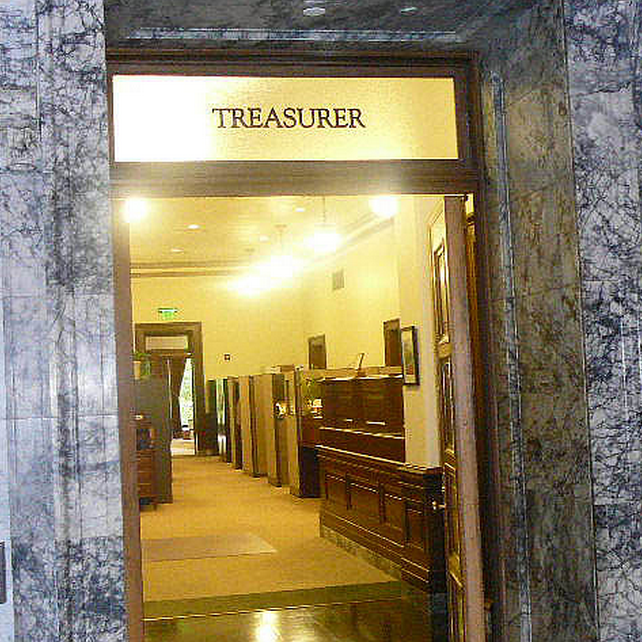
The Washington state treasurer's office is located in the Washington State Capitol.

Aside from being third (behind the lieutenant governor and secretary of state, respectively) in the constitutional line of succession to the office of Governor, most of the state treasurer's specific responsibilities are set forth in the Revised Code of Washington. In fact, the Washington Constitution only provides that "the treasurer shall perform such duties as shall be prescribed by law," a provision similar to the earlier enacted constitution of the neighboring state of Oregon. The constitution originally directed that the treasurer would be paid a salary of $2,000, though constitutional limits on officeholder salaries have since been repealed by amendment and are now set by statute.

== Election and term of office ==
The treasurer is elected every four years on a partisan ballot; any registered voter in the state of Washington is eligible to stand for election. The Washington State Constitution requires that, upon assuming office, the treasurer establish residence in the state's capital city of Olympia. State law further requires he post a surety bond of $500,000, approved by both the Washington Secretary of State and the Chief Justice of the Washington Supreme Court.

== List of Washington treasurers ==
The State of Washington has had a total of 22 individual treasurers, two of whom (Otto A. Case and Tom Martin) served non-consecutive terms. Otto A. Case also served as Commissioner of Public Lands from 1945 to 1949 and 1953–1957.

#	Image	Name	Term	Party
1		Addison Alexander Lindsley	1889–1893	Republican
2		Orzo A. Bowen	1893–1897	Republican
3		Cyrus Wilber Young	1897–1901	Populist
4		Charles Warren Maynard	1901–1905	Republican
5		George Grant Mills	1905–1909	Republican
6		John G. Lewis	1909–1913	Republican
7		Edward Meath	1913–1917	Republican
8		Walter W. Sherman	1917–1921	Republican
9		Clifford L. Babcock	1921–1925	Republican
10		William George Potts	1925–1929	Republican
11		Charles W. Hinton	1929–1933	Republican
12 & 14		Otto A. Case	1933–1937; 1941–1945	Democratic
13		Phil Henry Gallagher	1937–1941	Democratic
15		Russell Harrison Fluent	1945–1949	Democratic
16 & 18		Tom Martin	1949–1953; 1957–1965	Democratic
17		Charles R. Maybury	1953–1957	Republican
19		Robert S. O'Brien	1965–1989	Democratic
20		Dan Grimm	1989–1997	Democratic
21		Michael J. Murphy	1997–2009	Democratic
22		James McIntire	2009–2016	Democratic
23		Duane Davidson	2017–2021	Republican
24		Mike Pellicciotti	2021–present	Democratic

== See also ==
- State treasurer
- State constitutional officer (United States)
