= 2012 Washington elections =

Election in Washington, USA

2012 Washington Statewide Executive Offices elections
- November 6, 2012

All 9 Statewide Executive Offices
	Majority party	Minority party
Party	Democratic	Republican
Last election	7	2
Seats won	8	1
Seat change	▲1	▼1
Percentage	58.42%	41.53%
Swing	▲1.30%	▼1.35%

Elections held in the state of Washington on November 6, 2012. A nonpartisan blanket primary was held on August 7, 2012.

== Federal ==
=== U.S. President ===
In this election, Washington had 12 electors to the Electoral College. Incumbent Democratic president Barack Obama safely carried the state, gaining all 12 electoral votes against Republican nominee Mitt Romney.

2012 United States presidential election in Washington
Party	Candidate	Votes	%
Democratic	Barack Obama (incumbent)	1,755,396	56.16
Republican	Mitt Romney	1,290,670	41.29
Libertarian	Gary Johnson	42,202	1.35
Green	Jill Stein	20,928	0.67
Constitution	Virgil Goode	8,851	0.28
Justice	Rocky Anderson	4,946	0.16
Socialism and Liberation	Peta Lindsay	1,318	0.04
Socialist Workers	James Harris	1,205	0.04
Total votes		3,125,516	100.00

=== U.S. Senate ===
Incumbent Democratic senator Maria Cantwell won re-election to a third term against Republican state senator Michael Baumgartner.

2012 United States Senate election in Washington
Primary election
Party	Candidate	Votes	%
Democratic	Maria Cantwell (incumbent)	626,360	55.42
Republican	Michael Baumgartner	344,729	30.50
Republican	Art Coday	59,255	5.24
Democratic	Timothy Wilson	26,850	2.38
Republican	Chuck Jackson	21,870	1.94
Republican	Glenn R. Stockwell	21,731	1.92
Republican	Mike the Mover	16,459	1.46
Reform	Will Baker	12,865	1.14
Total votes		1,130,119	100.00
General election
Democratic	Maria Cantwell (incumbent)	1,855,493	60.45
Republican	Michael Baumgartner	1,213,924	39.55
Total votes		3,069,417	100.00
Democratic hold			

=== U.S. House ===
Due to the results of the 2010 United States census, Washington elected U.S. Representatives from ten congressional districts, a gain of one seat.

Incumbents Rick Larsen (D-2nd), Jaime Herrera Beutler (R-3rd), Doc Hastings (R-4th), Cathy McMorris Rodgers (R-5th), Jim McDermott (D-7th), Dave Reichert (R-8th), and Adam Smith (R-9th) ran for re-election and won. Incumbents Jay Inslee (D-1st) and Norman D. Dicks (D-6th) retired and were respectively succeeded by Suzan DelBene (D) and Derek Kilmer (D). Denny Heck (D) was elected to the newly created 10th district.

The resulting composition was six Democrats and four Republicans.

== State ==
=== Governor ===
Incumbent Democratic governor Christine Gregoire declined to run for a third term. Democratic congressman Jay Inslee ran to succeed her, earning Gregoire's endorsement. He faced Republican attorney general Rob McKenna in the general election, defeating him by a small margin.

2012 Washington gubernatorial election
Primary election
Party	Candidate	Votes	%
Democratic	Jay Inslee	664,534	47.13
Republican	Rob McKenna	604,872	42.90
Republican	Shahram Hadian	46,169	3.27
Democratic	Rob Hill	45,453	3.22
Independent	James White	13,764	0.98
Independent	Christian Joubert	10,457	0.74
Independent	L. Dale Sorgen	9,734	0.69
Republican	Max Sampson	8,753	0.62
Republican	Javier O. Lopez	6,131	0.43
Total votes		1,409,867	100.00
General election
Democratic	Jay Inslee	1,582,802	51.54
Republican	Rob McKenna	1,488,245	48.46
Total votes		3,071,047	100.00
Democratic hold			

=== Lieutenant governor ===
Incumbent Democratic lieutenant governor Brad Owen ran for re-election to a fifth term.

2012 Washington lieutenant gubernatorial election
Primary election
Party	Candidate	Votes	%
Democratic	Brad Owen (incumbent)	648,110	48.51
Republican	Bill Finkbeiner	352,195	26.36
Independent Republican	Glenn Anderson	229,318	17.17
Independent	Jimmy Deal	53,694	4.02
Independent	Clifford Mark Greene	46,534	3.48
Independent	Dave T. Sumner IV	6,057	0.45
Total votes		1,335,908	100.00
General election
Democratic	Brad Owen (incumbent)	1,575,133	53.68
Republican	Bill Finkbeiner	1,359,212	46.32
Total votes		2,934,345	100.00
Democratic hold			

=== Secretary of State ===
Incumbent Republican Secretary of State Sam Reed declined to run for re-election to a fourth term. The general election was won by Republican Thurston County auditor Kim Wyman, who defeated Democratic state senator Kathleen Drew by under one percentage point, resulting in the smallest statewide margin in 2012.

2012 Washington Secretary of State election
Primary election
Party	Candidate	Votes	%
Republican	Kim Wyman	528,754	39.76
Democratic	Kathleen Drew	289,052	21.73
Democratic	Gregory J. Nickels	210,832	15.85
Democratic	Jim Kastama	185,425	13.94
Constitution	Karen Murray	50,888	3.83
Independent	David J. Anderson	44,276	3.33
Human Rights	Sam Wright	20,809	1.57
Total votes		1,330,036	100.00
General election
Republican	Kim Wyman	1,464,741	50.38
Democratic	Kathleen Drew	1,442,868	49.62
Total votes		2,907,609	100.00
Republican hold			

=== Attorney general ===
Incumbent Republican attorney general Rob McKenna retired to run for governor and did not seek a third term. Two King County Councilmembers, Republican Reagan Dunn and Democrat Bob Ferguson, faced off in the general election. Ferguson ultimately won the election.

2012 Washington Attorney General election
Primary election
Party	Candidate	Votes	%
Democratic	Bob Ferguson	685,346	51.68
Republican	Reagan Dunn	506,524	38.20
Republican	Stephen Pidgeon	134,185	10.12
Total votes		1,326,055	100.00
General election
Democratic	Bob Ferguson	1,564,443	53.48
Republican	Reagan Dunn	1,361,010	46.52
Total votes		2,925,453	100.00
Democratic gain from Republican			

=== State Treasurer ===
Incumbent Democratic Treasurer James McIntire ran for re-election to a second term.

2012 Washington State Treasurer election
Primary election
Party	Candidate	Votes	%
Democratic	James McIntire (incumbent)	925,850	96.62
Republican	Sharon Hanek (write-in)	32,339	3.38
Total votes		958,189	100.00
General election
Democratic	James McIntire (incumbent)	1,695,401	58.71
Republican	Sharon Hanek	1,192,150	41.29
Total votes		2,887,551	100.00
Democratic hold			

=== State Auditor ===
Incumbent Democratic Auditor Brian Sonntag declined to run for re-election to a sixth term. Democratic state representative Troy Kelley won the election, defeating Republican James Watkins.

2012 Washington State Auditor election
Primary election
Party	Candidate	Votes	%
Republican	James Watkins	584,444	46.09
Democratic	Troy Kelley	291,335	22.98
Democratic	Craig Pridemore	268,220	21.15
Democratic	Mark Miloscia	123,936	9.77
Total votes		1,267,935	100.00
General election
Democratic	Troy Kelley	1,512,620	52.95
Republican	James Watkins	1,344,137	47.05
Total votes		2,856,757	100.00
Democratic hold			

=== Insurance Commissioner ===
Incumbent Democratic Insurance Commissioner Mike Kreidler ran for re-election to a fourth term, defeating Republican John Adams with 58% of the vote.

2012 Washington Insurance Commissioner election
Primary election
Party	Candidate	Votes	%
Democratic	Mike Kreidler (incumbent)	712,095	54.91
Republican	John Adams	279,052	21.52
Republican	Scott Reilly	241,377	18.61
Independent	Brian C. Berend	64,303	4.96
Total votes		1,296,827	100.00
General election
Democratic	Mike Kreidler (incumbent)	1,662,555	58.30
Republican	John Adams	1,188,926	41.70
Total votes		2,851,481	100.00
Democratic hold			

=== Commissioner of Public Lands ===
Incumbent Democratic Commissioner of Public Lands Peter J. Goldmark ran for re-election to a second term, defeating Republican Clint Didier.

2012 Washington Commissioner of Public Lands election
Primary election
Party	Candidate	Votes	%
Democratic	Peter J. Goldmark (incumbent)	683,448	51.88
Republican	Clint Didier	540,907	41.06
Independent	Stephen A. Sharon	92,993	7.06
Total votes		1,317,348	100.00
General election
Democratic	Peter J. Goldmark (incumbent)	1,692,083	58.74
Republican	Clint Didier	1,188,411	41.26
Total votes		2,880,494	100.00
Democratic hold			

=== Superintendent of Public Instruction ===
Incumbent Democratic Superintendent of Public Instruction Randy Dorn ran for re-election to a second term. He was unopposed in the general election. The superintendent is the only nonpartisan statewide election.

2012 Washington Superintendent of Public Instruction election
Primary election
Party	Candidate	Votes	%
Nonpartisan	Randy Dorn (incumbent)	634,314	56.22
Nonpartisan	Ron Higgins	172,331	15.27
Nonpartisan	James Bauckman	149,370	13.24
Nonpartisan	Donald Hansler	104,360	9.25
Nonpartisan	John P. Blair	67,898	6.02
Total votes		1,128,273	100.00
General election
Nonpartisan	Randy Dorn (incumbent)	2,164,163	100.00
Total votes		2,164,163	100.00
Democratic hold			

=== State Senate ===
The Democrats won on election night, but in early December two Democrats formed a conservative coalition with the Republican Caucus.

=== Ballot measures ===
- Initiative 502 – Passed – Licensing and Regulating Marijuana

Initiative 502
Choice	Votes	%
For	1,724,209	55.70
Against	1,371,235	44.30
Total	3,095,444	100.00

- Initiative 1185 – Passed – Supermajority to Raise Taxes or Close Loopholes

Initiative 1185
Choice	Votes	%
For	1,892,969	63.91
Against	1,069,083	36.09
Total	2,962,052	100.00

- Initiative 1240 – Passed – Allow Charter Schools

Initiative 1240
Choice	Votes	%
For	1,525,807	50.69
Against	1,484,125	49.31
Total	3,009,932	100.00

- Referendum 74 – Passed – Same Sex Marriage

Referendum 74
Choice	Votes	%
For	1,659,915	53.70
Against	1,431,285	46.30
Total	3,091,200	100.00
