= 2012 Washington Secretary of State election =

- November 6, 2012
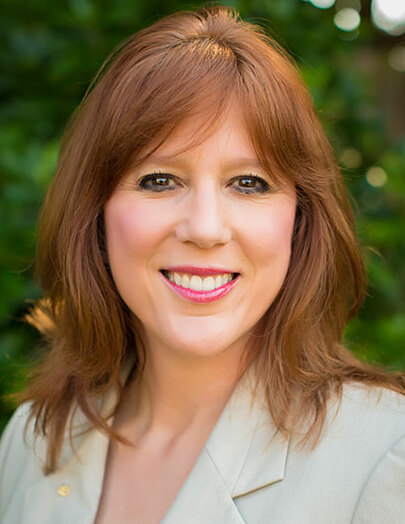

Nominee	Kim Wyman	Kathleen Drew
Party	Republican	Democratic
Popular vote	1,464,741	1,442,868
Percentage	50.38%	49.62%
- Wyman: 50–60% 60–70% 70–80% 80–90% >90% Drew: 50–60% 60–70% 70–80% 80–90% >90% Tie: 50% No votes
Secretary of State before election
Sam Reed
Republican
Elected Secretary of State
Kim Wyman
Republican

The 2012 Washington Secretary of State election took place on November 6, 2012. Republican Kim Wyman was narrowly elected Secretary of State to succeed incumbent Republican Sam Reed, who did not seek re-election.

== Primary election ==
The primary election took place in August. Under Washington's top-two primary system, introduced in the early 2000s, the primary was designed to narrow the field of candidates to two, rather than select specific party nominees, and candidates could designate themselves as affiliated with any political party, whether it existed or not.

Seven candidates contested the primary:

- Thurston County Auditor Kim Wyman ran under the Republican Party designation.
- Karen Murray ran under the Constitution Party designation.
- Sam Wright ran under the Human Rights Party designation.
- David J. Anderson ran as an independent candidate.
- Former Seattle mayor Greg Nickels, state senator Jim Kastama, and former state legislator Kathleen Drew, all ran under the Democratic Party designation.

Wyman and Drew scored the most votes in the primary contest, thereby becoming the two candidates to advance to the general election. Wyman received 39.75-percent of the vote and Drew 21.73-percent.

=== Endorsements ===
Jim Kastama (D)

Newspapers

- The Seattle Times
Kim Wyman (R)

Statewide officials

- Bruce Chapman, former secretary of state of Washington (1975–1981)
- Ralph Munro, former secretary of state of Washington (1981–2001)
- Sam Reed, secretary of state of Washington (2001–2013)

=== Results ===
County results Wyman: 20–30%; 30–40%; 40–50%; 50–60%; 60–70%; Drew: 30–40%

Congressional district results Wyman: 30–40%; 40–50%; 50–60%; Drew: 30–40%

2012 Washington Secretary of State blanket primary election
Primary election
Party	Candidate	Votes	%
Republican	Kim Wyman	528,754	39.75
Democratic	Kathleen Drew	289,052	21.73
Democratic	Greg Nickels	210,832	15.85
Democratic	Jim Kastama	185,425	13.94
Constitution	Karen Murray	50,888	3.83
Independent	David J. Anderson	44,276	3.33
Human Rights	Sam Wright	20,809	1.56
Total votes		1,330,036	100.00

==== By county ====
Combined partisan vote by county Democratic: 40–50%; 50–60%; 60–70%; Republican: 40–50%; 50–60%; 60–70%

Combined partisan vote by congressional district Democratic: 40–50%; 50–60%; 60–70%; 70–80%; Republican: 40–50%; 50–60%

County results
County	Kim Wyman Republican		Kathleen Drew Democratic		Greg Nickels Democratic		Jim Kastama Democratic		Various candidates Other parties		Margin		Total votes
County	#	%	#	%	#	%	#	%	#	%	#	%	Total votes
Adams	1,416	58.78%	214	8.88%	203	8.43%	148	6.14%	428	17.77%	1,202	49.90%	2,409
Asotin	2,144	46.08%	820	17.62%	541	11.63%	396	8.51%	752	16.16%	1,324	28.45%	4,653
Benton	16,155	53.75%	4,130	13.74%	2,277	7.58%	2,657	8.84%	4,835	16.09%	12,025	40.01%	30,054
Chelan	8,338	50.99%	1,979	12.10%	2,203	13.47%	1,404	8.59%	2,428	14.85%	6,135	37.52%	16,352
Clallam	8,329	43.26%	3,866	20.08%	3,008	15.62%	1,853	9.62%	2,196	11.41%	4,463	23.18%	19,252
Clark	30,554	46.27%	12,679	19.20%	7,350	11.13%	7,705	11.67%	7,747	11.73%	17,875	27.07%	66,035
Columbia	615	58.18%	110	10.41%	78	7.38%	90	8.51%	164	15.52%	505	47.78%	1,057
Cowlitz	7,284	40.64%	3,655	20.39%	2,083	11.62%	2,348	13.10%	2,554	14.25%	3,629	20.25%	17,924
Douglas	4,019	55.72%	835	11.58%	914	12.67%	497	6.89%	948	13.14%	3,105	43.05%	7,213
Ferry	800	48.34%	285	17.22%	124	7.49%	150	9.06%	296	17.89%	515	31.12%	1,655
Franklin	4,856	55.01%	1,124	12.73%	692	7.84%	698	7.91%	1,457	16.51%	3,732	42.28%	8,827
Garfield	353	62.26%	57	10.05%	48	8.47%	46	8.11%	63	11.11%	296	52.20%	567
Grant	6,529	54.83%	1,406	11.81%	1,203	10.10%	834	7.00%	1,935	16.25%	5,123	43.03%	11,907
Grays Harbor	4,790	34.69%	2,446	17.71%	3,144	22.77%	1,514	10.96%	1,914	13.86%	1,646	11.92%	13,808
Island	9,438	41.99%	4,504	20.04%	4,059	18.06%	2,380	10.59%	2,098	9.33%	4,934	21.95%	22,479
Jefferson	3,342	29.57%	3,536	31.29%	2,214	19.59%	1,124	9.95%	1,085	9.60%	-194	-1.72%	11,301
King	120,097	29.64%	116,899	28.85%	82,980	20.48%	68,138	16.81%	17,124	4.23%	3,198	0.79%	405,238
Kitsap	23,477	40.69%	12,059	20.90%	10,638	18.44%	7,013	12.15%	4,516	7.83%	11,418	19.79%	57,703
Kittitas	3,984	48.92%	1,208	14.83%	1,121	13.76%	835	10.25%	996	12.23%	2,776	34.09%	8,144
Klickitat	1,847	46.48%	816	20.53%	309	7.78%	421	10.59%	581	14.62%	1,031	25.94%	3,974
Lewis	8,316	53.89%	1,708	11.07%	2,037	13.20%	1,191	7.72%	2,179	14.12%	6,279	40.69%	15,431
Lincoln	1,769	59.62%	314	10.58%	189	6.37%	231	7.79%	464	15.64%	1,455	49.04%	2,967
Mason	5,885	39.68%	2,567	17.31%	2,827	19.06%	1,638	11.04%	1,916	12.92%	3,058	20.62%	14,833
Okanogan	3,812	47.61%	1,321	16.50%	837	10.45%	742	9.27%	1,294	16.16%	2,491	31.11%	8,006
Pacific	2,154	36.68%	1,237	21.07%	1,002	17.06%	713	12.14%	766	13.04%	917	15.62%	5,872
Pend Oreille	1,475	44.33%	539	16.20%	388	11.66%	248	7.45%	677	20.35%	936	28.13%	3,327
Pierce	57,884	40.06%	22,033	15.25%	18,698	12.94%	36,266	25.10%	9,601	6.65%	21,618	14.96%	144,482
San Juan	1,685	32.33%	1,597	30.64%	966	18.53%	560	10.74%	404	7.75%	88	1.69%	5,212
Skagit	11,173	42.20%	4,602	17.38%	4,796	18.11%	3,018	11.40%	2,887	10.90%	6,377	24.09%	26,476
Skamania	958	44.13%	454	20.91%	165	7.60%	263	12.11%	331	15.25%	504	23.22%	2,171
Snohomish	56,477	41.96%	29,165	21.67%	22,360	16.61%	17,031	12.65%	9,574	7.11%	27,312	20.29%	134,607
Spokane	42,243	44.19%	18,677	19.54%	10,589	11.08%	9,302	9.73%	14,780	15.46%	23,566	24.65%	95,591
Stevens	5,365	51.19%	1,362	13.00%	764	7.29%	921	8.79%	2,068	19.73%	4,003	38.20%	10,480
Thurston	27,946	48.92%	11,999	21.00%	8,261	14.46%	5,213	9.12%	3,711	6.50%	15,947	27.91%	57,130
Wahkiakum	493	42.10%	232	19.81%	148	12.64%	134	11.44%	164	14.01%	261	22.29%	1,171
Walla Walla	6,277	52.15%	1,798	14.94%	1,120	9.30%	1,146	9.52%	1,696	14.09%	4,479	37.21%	12,037
Whatcom	18,396	42.89%	11,232	26.19%	6,546	15.26%	3,313	7.72%	3,405	7.94%	7,164	16.70%	42,892
Whitman	3,323	48.58%	1,295	18.93%	653	9.55%	646	9.44%	923	13.49%	2,028	29.65%	6,840
Yakima	14,756	49.25%	4,292	14.33%	3,297	11.01%	2,598	8.67%	5,016	16.74%	10,464	34.93%	29,959
Totals	528,754	39.75%	289,052	21.73%	210,832	15.85%	185,425	13.94%	115,973	8.72%	239,702	18.02%	1,330,036

Counties that flipped from Republican to Democratic

- Clallam (largest city: Port Angeles)
- Cowlitz (largest city: Longview)
- Grays Harbor (largest city: Aberdeen)
- Island (largest city: Oak Harbor)
- Jefferson (largest city: Port Townsend)
- King (largest city: Seattle)
- Kitsap (largest city: Bremerton)
- Mason (largest city: Shelton)
- Pacific (largest city: Raymond)
- Pierce (largest city: Tacoma)
- San Juan (largest city: Friday Harbor)
- Skagit (largest city: Mount Vernon)
- Snohomish (largest city: Everett)
- Wahkiakum (largest city: Puget Island)
- Whatcom (largest city: Bellingham)

==== By congressional district ====
District	Wyman	Drew	Nickels	Kastama	Representative
1st	45%	20%	16%	13%	Suzan DelBene
2nd	39%	24%	18%	11%	Rick Larsen
3rd	46%	18%	12%	11%	Jaime Herrera Beutler
4th	52%	14%	9%	8%	Doc Hastings
5th	46%	18%	10%	10%	Cathy McMorris Rodgers
6th	38%	21%	18%	14%	Norm Dicks
7th	19%	37%	24%	17%	Jim McDermott
8th	47%	16%	14%	15%	Dave Reichert
9th	31%	25%	21%	19%	Adam Smith
10th	43%	17%	13%	20%	Denny Heck

== General election ==
Republican Kim Wyman won the general election in a close-fought contest, and was the only Republican elected to statewide office in Washington.

With Wyman's victory, Republicans extended their control of the office of Secretary of State of Washington to 48 consecutive years, having won each of the preceding 12 elections.

=== Post-primary endorsements ===
Kim Wyman (R)

Newspapers

- The Seattle Times
- Tri-City Herald
- Walla Walla Union-Bulletin
- The Wenatchee World

Labor unions

- Washington Education Association

=== Polling ===
Graphical summary

View source data.

Poll source	Date(s) administered	Sample size	Margin of error	Kim Wyman (R)	Kathleen Drew (D)	Undecided
Elway Research	October 18–21, 2012	451 (RV)	± 4.5%	34%	34%	32%
Elway Research	September 9–12, 2012	405 (RV)	± 5.0%	32%	40%	28%

=== Results ===
2012 Washington Secretary of State election
Party	Candidate	Votes	%	±%
Republican	Kim Wyman	1,464,741	50.38%	–7.95%
Democratic	Kathleen Drew	1,442,868	49.62%	+7.95%
Total votes		2,907,609	100.00%	N/A
Republican hold				

==== By county ====
County results
County	Kim Wyman Republican		Kathleen Drew Democratic		Margin		Total votes
County	#	%	#	%	#	%	Total votes
Adams	3,235	71.94%	1,262	28.06%	1,973	43.87%	4,497
Asotin	5,560	60.00%	3,706	40.00%	1,854	20.01%	9,266
Benton	50,318	68.00%	23,684	32.00%	26,634	35.99%	74,002
Chelan	19,282	64.35%	10,681	35.65%	8,601	28.71%	29,963
Clallam	19,699	55.09%	16,058	44.91%	3,641	10.18%	35,757
Clark	98,251	55.06%	80,180	44.94%	18,071	10.13%	178,431
Columbia	1,536	73.28%	560	26.72%	976	46.56%	2,096
Cowlitz	21,886	52.21%	20,036	47.79%	1,850	4.41%	41,922
Douglas	9,655	68.66%	4,407	31.34%	5,248	37.32%	14,062
Ferry	2,023	62.63%	1,207	37.37%	816	25.26%	3,230
Franklin	14,275	65.88%	7,394	34.12%	6,881	31.76%	21,669
Garfield	866	73.14%	318	26.86%	548	46.28%	1,184
Grant	18,064	69.33%	7,990	30.67%	10,074	38.67%	26,054
Grays Harbor	13,665	50.09%	13,615	49.91%	50	0.18%	27,280
Island	21,376	54.26%	18,020	45.74%	3,356	8.52%	39,396
Jefferson	7,507	40.18%	11,175	59.82%	-3,668	-19.63%	18,682
King	345,268	39.05%	538,986	60.95%	-193,718	-21.91%	884,254
Kitsap	59,488	51.17%	56,774	48.83%	2,714	2.33%	116,262
Kittitas	10,183	61.08%	6,488	38.92%	3,695	22.16%	16,671
Klickitat	5,477	56.66%	4,189	43.34%	1,288	13.33%	9,666
Lewis	21,520	67.04%	10,578	32.96%	10,942	34.09%	32,098
Lincoln	4,054	73.43%	1,467	26.57%	2,587	46.86%	5,521
Mason	14,623	54.56%	12,181	45.44%	2,442	9.11%	26,804
Okanogan	9,611	60.25%	6,342	39.75%	3,269	20.49%	15,953
Pacific	4,734	48.16%	5,096	51.84%	-362	-3.68%	9,830
Pend Oreille	4,050	64.40%	2,239	35.60%	1,811	28.80%	6,289
Pierce	168,773	52.69%	151,556	47.31%	17,217	5.37%	320,329
San Juan	3,689	37.03%	6,274	62.97%	-2,585	-25.95%	9,963
Skagit	27,815	53.76%	23,920	46.24%	3,895	7.53%	51,735
Skamania	2,731	53.66%	2,358	46.34%	373	7.33%	5,089
Snohomish	153,513	49.75%	155,030	50.25%	-1,517	-0.49%	308,543
Spokane	121,352	58.10%	87,499	41.90%	33,853	16.21%	208,851
Stevens	14,200	67.55%	6,822	32.45%	7,378	35.10%	21,022
Thurston	70,374	58.40%	50,133	41.60%	20,241	16.80%	120,507
Wahkiakum	1,185	55.74%	941	44.26%	244	11.48%	2,126
Walla Walla	15,092	64.61%	8,268	35.39%	6,824	29.21%	23,360
Whatcom	46,491	48.32%	49,722	51.68%	-3,231	-3.36%	96,213
Whitman	9,122	57.66%	6,699	42.34%	2,423	15.32%	15,821
Yakima	44,198	60.37%	29,013	39.63%	15,185	20.74%	73,211
Totals	1,464,741	50.38%	1,442,868	49.62%	21,873	0.75%	2,907,609

Counties that flipped from Republican to Democratic

- Jefferson (largest city: Port Townsend)
- King (largest city: Seattle)
- Pacific (largest city: Raymond)
- Snohomish (largest city: Everett)
- Whatcom (largest city: Bellingham)

==== By congressional district ====
Wyman won six of ten congressional districts, including two that elected Democrats.

District	Wyman	Podlodowski	Representative
1st	53%	47%	Suzan DelBene
2nd	47%	53%	Rick Larsen
3rd	56%	44%	Jaime Herrera Beutler
4th	65%	35%	Doc Hastings
5th	60%	40%	Cathy McMorris Rodgers
6th	49.9%	50.1%	Derek Kilmer
7th	28%	72%	Jim McDermott
8th	57%	43%	Dave Reichert
9th	40%	60%	Adam Smith
10th	55%	45%	Denny Heck
