= Kathleen Drew =

Kathleen Drew may refer to:

- Kathleen Mary Drew-Baker, British phycologist
- Kathleen Drew (politician), member of the Washington Senate
