= 2024 Washington Secretary of State election =

- November 5, 2024
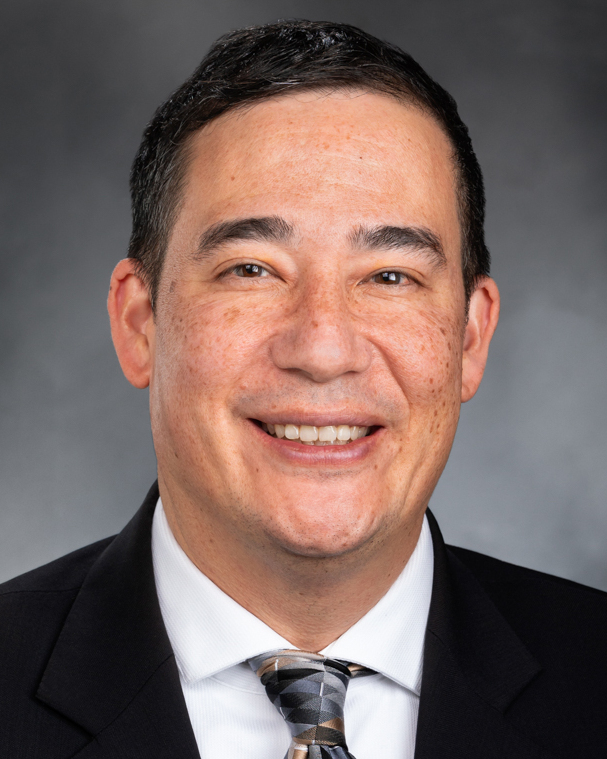

Nominee	Steve Hobbs	Dale Whitaker
Party	Democratic	Republican
Popular vote	2,234,420	1,535,977
Percentage	59.20%	40.70%
- Hobbs: 40–50% 50–60% 60–70% 70–80% 80–90% >90% Whitaker: 40–50% 50–60% 60–70% 70–80% 80–90% >90% Tie: 40–50% 50% No votes
Secretary of State before election
Steve Hobbs
Democratic
Elected Secretary of State
Steve Hobbs
Democratic

The 2024 Washington Secretary of State election was held on Tuesday, November 5, 2024, to elect the Washington Secretary of State, concurrently with the 2024 U.S. presidential election, as well as elections to the U.S. Senate and various state and local elections, including for U.S. House and governor of Washington. Washington is one of two states that holds a top-two primary, meaning that all candidates are listed on the same ballot regardless of party affiliation, and the top two move on to the general election.

Incumbent Democratic Secretary of State Steve Hobbs was appointed to the position in 2021 after the resignation of Republican Kim Wyman. He won a 2022 special election to serve out the remaining two years of Wyman's term and ran for re-election to a full term in 2024. Hobbs won the election decisively against Republican candidate Dale Whitaker, with Whitaker being the worst performing statewide Republican candidate that year.

== Candidates ==
=== Democratic Party ===
==== Advanced to general ====
- Steve Hobbs, incumbent secretary of state (2021–present)

==== Eliminated in primary ====
- Marquez Tiggs, graduate student and candidate for secretary of state in 2022

=== Republican Party ===
==== Advanced to general ====
- Dale Whitaker, tax preparer

==== Withdrawn ====
- Phil Fortunato, state senator for the 31st district (2017–present) and candidate for governor in 2020 (ran for state insurance commissioner)
- Bob Hagglund, IT professional and candidate for secretary of state in 2022 (ran for lieutenant governor)

==== Declined ====
- Kim Wyman, senior election security advisor for the Cybersecurity and Infrastructure Security Agency (2021–present) and former Washington Secretary of State (2013–2021)

=== No Labels ===
==== Eliminated in primary ====
- Damon Townsend, election operations consultant

== Primary election ==
=== Endorsements ===
Steve Hobbs (D)

Newspapers

- The Seattle Times
- The Stranger
Dale Whitaker (R)

Political parties

- Washington State Republican Party

=== Polling ===
Poll source	Date(s) administered	Sample size (Note: Key: A – all adults RV – registered voters LV – likely voters V – unclear)	Margin of error	Steve Hobbs (D)	Marquez Tiggs (D)	Damon Townsend (NL)	Dale Whitaker (R)	Undecided
Public Policy Polling (D) (Note: Poll sponsored by the Northwest Progressive Institute)	July 24–25, 2024	581 (LV)	± 4.0%	23%	7%	5%	30%	35%

=== Results ===
County results Hobbs: 40–50%; 50–60%; 60–70%; Whitaker: 40–50%; 50–60%; 60–70%; 70–80%

Congressional district results Hobbs: 40–50%; 50–60%; 70–80%; Whitaker: 40–50%; 50–60%

Blanket primary election results
Party	Candidate	Votes	%
Democratic	Steve Hobbs (incumbent)	930,533	48.38%
Republican	Dale Whitaker	709,046	36.87%
Democratic	Marquez Tiggs	185,628	9.65%
No Labels	Damon Townsend	96,586	5.02%
Write-in		1,534	0.08%
Total votes		1,923,327	100.00%

==== By county ====
Combined partisan vote by county Democratic: 50–60%; 60–70%; 70–80%; Republican: 40–50%; 50–60%; 60–70%; 70–80%

Combined partisan vote by congressional district Democratic: 50–60%; 60–70%; 70–80%; 80–90%; Republican: 40–50%; 50–60%

County results
County	Steve Hobbs Democratic		Dale Whitaker Republican		Marquez Tiggs Democratic		Damon Townsend No Labels		Write-in Various		Margin		Total votes
County	#	%	#	%	#	%	#	%	#	%	#	%	Total votes
Adams	438	17.96%	1,753	71.87%	120	4.92%	124	5.08%	4	0.16%	-1,315	-53.92%	2,439
Asotin	1,559	27.73%	3,274	58.23%	454	8.07%	331	5.89%	5	0.09%	-1,715	-30.50%	5,623
Benton	14,636	29.51%	28,728	57.93%	3,358	6.77%	2,823	5.69%	44	0.09%	-14,092	-28.42%	49,589
Chelan	7,656	35.22%	12,023	55.31%	1,296	5.96%	747	3.44%	16	0.07%	-4,367	-20.09%	21,738
Clallam	13,239	46.58%	11,048	38.87%	2,468	8.68%	1,657	5.83%	13	0.05%	2,191	7.71%	28,425
Clark	55,758	42.19%	56,324	42.62%	12,841	9.72%	7,090	5.37%	138	0.10%	-566	-0.43%	132,151
Columbia	257	20.19%	899	70.62%	62	4.87%	54	4.24%	1	0.08%	-642	-50.43%	1,273
Cowlitz	8,716	30.40%	16,162	56.37%	2,586	9.02%	1,171	4.08%	36	0.13%	-7,446	-25.97%	28,671
Douglas	2,929	26.98%	7,056	65.00%	529	4.87%	329	3.03%	12	0.11%	-4,127	-38.02%	10,855
Ferry	554	23.62%	1,561	66.57%	130	5.54%	98	4.18%	2	0.09%	-1,007	-42.94%	2,345
Franklin	3,411	24.48%	8,445	60.61%	1,229	8.82%	840	6.03%	8	0.06%	-5,034	-36.13%	13,933
Garfield	117	16.05%	566	77.64%	16	2.19%	30	4.12%	0	0.00%	-449	-61.59%	729
Grant	3,163	19.22%	11,721	71.23%	990	6.02%	571	3.47%	10	0.06%	-8,558	-52.01%	16,455
Grays Harbor	7,413	38.59%	9,458	49.23%	1,579	8.22%	750	3.90%	11	0.06%	-2,045	-10.64%	19,211
Island	14,156	48.06%	11,659	39.58%	2,532	8.60%	1,079	3.66%	29	0.10%	2,497	8.48%	29,455
Jefferson	9,901	63.53%	3,391	21.76%	1,532	9.83%	755	4.84%	6	0.04%	6,510	41.77%	15,585
King	355,176	65.67%	106,603	19.71%	55,873	10.33%	22,816	4.22%	357	0.07%	248,573	45.96%	540,825
Kitsap	40,336	48.70%	28,208	34.05%	9,273	11.19%	4,956	5.98%	59	0.07%	12,128	14.64%	82,832
Kittitas	3,759	32.08%	6,735	57.48%	800	6.83%	413	3.52%	11	0.09%	-2,976	-25.40%	11,718
Klickitat	2,527	34.05%	3,834	51.66%	588	7.92%	465	6.27%	8	0.11%	-1,307	-17.61%	7,422
Lewis	5,523	23.48%	15,621	66.40%	1,485	6.31%	861	3.66%	34	0.14%	-10,098	-42.93%	23,524
Lincoln	692	17.59%	2,852	72.51%	182	4.63%	205	5.21%	2	0.05%	-2,160	-54.92%	3,933
Mason	7,206	37.60%	9,307	48.57%	1,785	9.31%	840	4.38%	25	0.13%	-2,101	-10.96%	19,163
Okanogan	3,854	32.92%	6,366	54.38%	774	6.61%	702	6.00%	11	0.09%	-2,512	-21.46%	11,707
Pacific	2,963	37.09%	3,912	48.97%	838	10.49%	263	3.29%	12	0.15%	-949	-11.88%	7,988
Pend Oreille	1,156	25.97%	2,793	62.74%	230	5.17%	268	6.02%	5	0.11%	-1,637	-36.77%	4,452
Pierce	88,654	42.81%	82,656	39.92%	22,863	11.04%	12,739	6.15%	162	0.08%	5,998	2.90%	207,074
San Juan	4,768	62.09%	1,609	20.95%	930	12.11%	365	4.75%	7	0.09%	3,159	41.14%	7,679
Skagit	16,663	45.96%	14,324	39.51%	3,054	8.42%	2,192	6.05%	24	0.07%	2,339	6.45%	36,257
Skamania	1,326	33.34%	2,049	51.52%	346	8.70%	249	6.26%	7	0.18%	-723	-18.18%	3,977
Snohomish	96,994	49.01%	68,535	34.63%	20,604	10.41%	11,618	5.87%	145	0.07%	28,459	14.38%	197,896
Spokane	53,270	37.98%	68,200	48.63%	11,574	8.25%	7,077	5.05%	123	0.09%	-14,930	-10.65%	140,244
Stevens	3,290	21.21%	10,570	68.16%	759	4.89%	873	5.63%	16	0.10%	-7,280	-46.94%	15,508
Thurston	43,073	50.42%	28,462	33.32%	8,951	10.48%	4,878	5.71%	58	0.07%	14,611	17.10%	85,422
Wahkiakum	556	31.88%	954	54.70%	164	9.40%	69	3.96%	1	0.06%	-398	-22.82%	1,744
Walla Walla	5,001	34.66%	7,639	52.94%	1,150	7.97%	629	4.36%	10	0.07%	-2,638	-18.28%	14,429
Whatcom	34,762	49.75%	24,833	35.54%	7,062	10.11%	3,164	4.53%	52	0.07%	9,929	14.21%	69,873
Whitman	3,303	36.33%	4,500	49.50%	904	9.94%	377	4.15%	7	0.08%	-1,197	-13.17%	9,091
Yakima	11,778	27.98%	24,416	58.01%	3,717	8.83%	2,118	5.03%	63	0.15%	-12,638	-30.02%	42,092
Totals	930,533	48.38%	709,046	36.87%	185,628	9.65%	96,586	5.02%	1,534	0.08%	221,487	11.52%	1,923,327

Counties that flipped from Republican to Democratic

- Clark (largest city: Vancouver)
- Pierce (largest city: Tacoma)

==== By congressional district ====
District	Hobbs	Whitaker	Tiggs	Townsend	Representative
1st	54%	30%	10%	5%	Suzan DelBene
2nd	50%	34%	10%	5%	Rick Larsen
3rd	37%	48%	9%	5%	Marie Gluesenkamp Perez
4th	28%	59%	7%	5%	Dan Newhouse
5th	35%	52%	8%	5%	Cathy McMorris Rodgers
6th	49%	35%	11%	5%	Derek Kilmer
7th	78%	9%	9%	3%	Pramila Jayapal
8th	43.0%	43.1%	8%	6%	Kim Schrier
9th	59%	24%	13%	5%	Adam Smith
10th	47%	36%	12%	6%	Marilyn Strickland

== General election ==
=== Predictions ===
Source	Ranking	As of
Sabato's Crystal Ball	Safe D	January 31, 2024

=== Debate ===
2024 Washington Secretary of State debate
No.	Date	Host	Moderator	Link	Democratic	Republican
Key: P Participant A Absent N Not invited I Invited W Withdrawn						
Key: P Participant A Absent N Not invited I Invited W Withdrawn					Steve Hobbs	Dale Whitaker
1	Oct. 1, 2024	League of Women Voters	Mary Coltrane	TVW	P	P

=== Polling ===
Poll source	Date(s) administered	Sample size	Margin of error	Steve Hobbs (D)	Dale Whitaker (R)	Undecided
ActiVote	October 3–29, 2024	400 (LV)	± 4.9%	64%	36%	–
Public Policy Polling (D)	October 16–17, 2024	571 (LV)	± 4.1%	47%	34%	19%

=== Results ===
2024 Washington Secretary of State election
Party	Candidate	Votes	%	±%
Democratic	Steve Hobbs (incumbent)	2,234,420	59.20%	+12.93%
Republican	Dale Whitaker	1,535,977	40.70%	–12.91%
Write-in		3,958	0.10%	–0.02%
Total votes		3,774,355	100.00%	N/A
Democratic hold				

==== By county ====
County	Steve Hobbs Democratic		Dale Whitaker Republican		Write-in Various		Margin		Total
County	#	%	#	%	#	%	#	%	Total
Adams	1,419	27.46%	3,740	72.38%	8	0.15%	-2,321	-44.92%	5,167
Asotin	4,044	36.67%	6,965	63.16%	19	0.17%	-2,921	-26.49%	11,028
Benton	37,963	39.04%	59,194	60.87%	83	0.09%	-21,231	-21.83%	97,240
Chelan	18,163	44.88%	22,264	55.01%	47	0.12%	-4,101	-10.13%	40,474
Clallam	25,356	54.00%	21,564	45.92%	39	0.08%	3,792	8.08%	46,959
Clark	142,976	54.16%	120,647	45.70%	359	0.14%	22,329	8.46%	263,982
Columbia	658	27.58%	1,723	72.21%	5	0.21%	-1,065	-44.64%	2,386
Cowlitz	23,201	40.47%	34,068	59.43%	59	0.10%	-10,867	-18.96%	57,328
Douglas	7,512	36.73%	12,914	63.15%	25	0.12%	-5,402	-26.41%	20,451
Ferry	1,288	32.19%	2,712	67.78%	1	0.02%	-1,424	-35.59%	4,001
Franklin	12,290	39.68%	18,661	60.25%	23	0.07%	-6,371	-20.57%	30,974
Garfield	326	24.68%	994	75.25%	1	0.08%	-668	-50.57%	1,321
Grant	10,747	30.73%	24,202	69.21%	18	0.05%	-13,455	-38.48%	34,967
Grays Harbor	17,302	47.46%	19,113	52.43%	38	0.10%	-1,811	-4.97%	36,453
Island	29,108	57.31%	21,620	42.56%	66	0.13%	7,488	14.74%	50,794
Jefferson	17,585	72.71%	6,583	27.22%	17	0.07%	11,002	45.49%	24,185
King	823,265	75.83%	261,343	24.07%	1,135	0.10%	561,922	51.75%	1,085,743
Kitsap	91,406	60.29%	60,045	39.61%	157	0.10%	31,361	20.69%	151,608
Kittitas	10,598	41.69%	14,805	58.23%	20	0.08%	-4,207	-16.55%	25,423
Klickitat	5,914	45.13%	7,181	54.80%	10	0.08%	-1,267	-9.67%	13,105
Lewis	14,533	33.21%	29,189	66.70%	40	0.09%	-14,656	-33.49%	43,762
Lincoln	1,625	23.35%	5,322	76.49%	11	0.16%	-3,697	-53.13%	6,958
Mason	17,067	48.16%	18,311	51.67%	57	0.16%	-1,244	-3.51%	35,435
Okanogan	8,529	42.51%	11,518	57.41%	15	0.07%	-2,989	-14.90%	20,062
Pacific	6,813	49.51%	6,934	50.39%	14	0.10%	-121	-0.88%	13,761
Pend Oreille	2,533	30.53%	5,754	69.34%	11	0.13%	-3,221	-38.82%	8,298
Pierce	234,819	55.49%	187,905	44.41%	425	0.10%	46,914	11.09%	423,149
San Juan	9,362	75.43%	3,035	24.45%	15	0.12%	6,327	50.97%	12,412
Skagit	36,595	54.30%	30,743	45.62%	57	0.08%	5,852	8.68%	67,395
Skamania	3,187	45.17%	3,860	54.71%	8	0.11%	-673	-9.54%	7,055
Snohomish	238,675	59.86%	159,690	40.05%	385	0.10%	78,985	19.81%	398,750
Spokane	129,933	46.99%	146,283	52.90%	297	0.11%	-16,350	-5.91%	276,513
Stevens	7,519	27.27%	20,022	72.62%	29	0.11%	-12,503	-45.35%	27,570
Thurston	97,125	61.01%	61,904	38.89%	166	0.10%	35,221	22.12%	159,195
Wahkiakum	1,195	40.66%	1,742	59.27%	2	0.07%	-547	-18.61%	2,939
Walla Walla	12,999	45.31%	15,682	54.66%	10	0.03%	-2,683	-9.35%	28,691
Whatcom	83,082	62.34%	50,090	37.59%	99	0.07%	32,992	24.76%	133,271
Whitman	10,302	53.25%	9,028	46.66%	18	0.09%	1,274	6.58%	19,348
Yakima	37,406	43.39%	48,627	56.41%	169	0.20%	-11,221	-13.02%	86,202
Totals	2,234,420	59.20%	1,535,977	40.70%	3,958	0.10%	698,443	18.50%	3,774,355

Counties that flipped from Republican to Democratic

- Clallam (largest city: Port Angeles)
- Clark (largest city: Vancouver)
- Island (largest city: Oak Harbor)
- Kitsap (largest city: Bremerton)
- Pierce (largest city: Tacoma)
- Skagit (largest city: Mount Vernon)
- Snohomish (largest city: Everett)
- Thurston (largest city: Lacey)
- Whitman (largest city: Pullman)

==== By congressional district ====
Hobbs won seven of ten congressional districts, with the remaining three going to Whitaker, including one that elected a Democrat.

District	Hobbs	Whitaker	Representative
1st	64%	36%	Suzan DelBene
2nd	62%	38%	Rick Larsen
3rd	49%	51%	Marie Gluesenkamp Perez
4th	40%	60%	Dan Newhouse
5th	44%	56%	Cathy McMorris Rodgers (118th Congress)
5th	44%	56%	Michael Baumgartner (119th Congress)
6th	60%	40%	Derek Kilmer (118th Congress)
6th	60%	40%	Emily Randall (119th Congress)
7th	88%	12%	Pramila Jayapal
8th	52%	48%	Kim Schrier
9th	71%	29%	Adam Smith
10th	59%	40%	Marilyn Strickland

== Notes ==
Partisan clients
