= 2016 Washington Secretary of State election =

- November 8, 2016
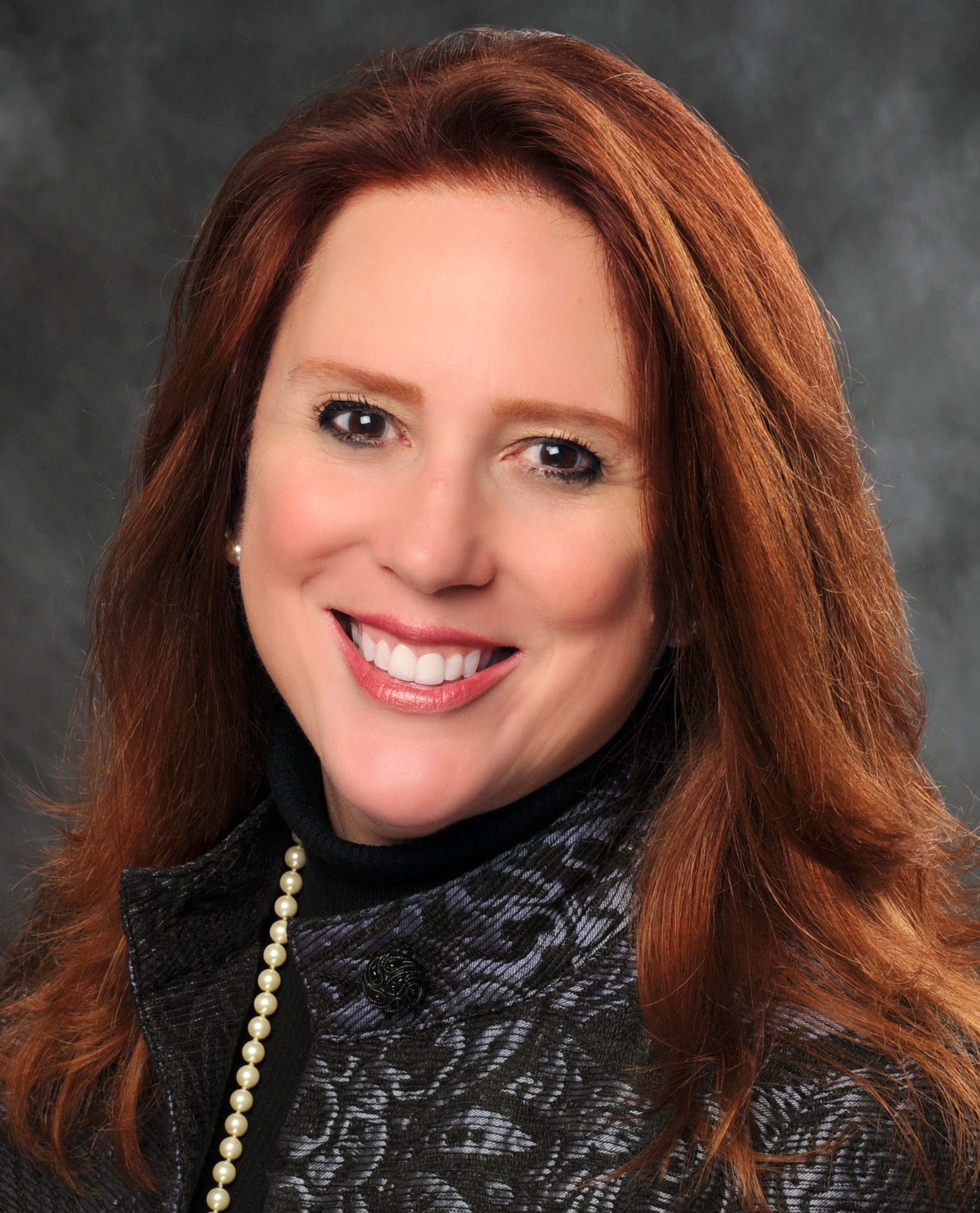

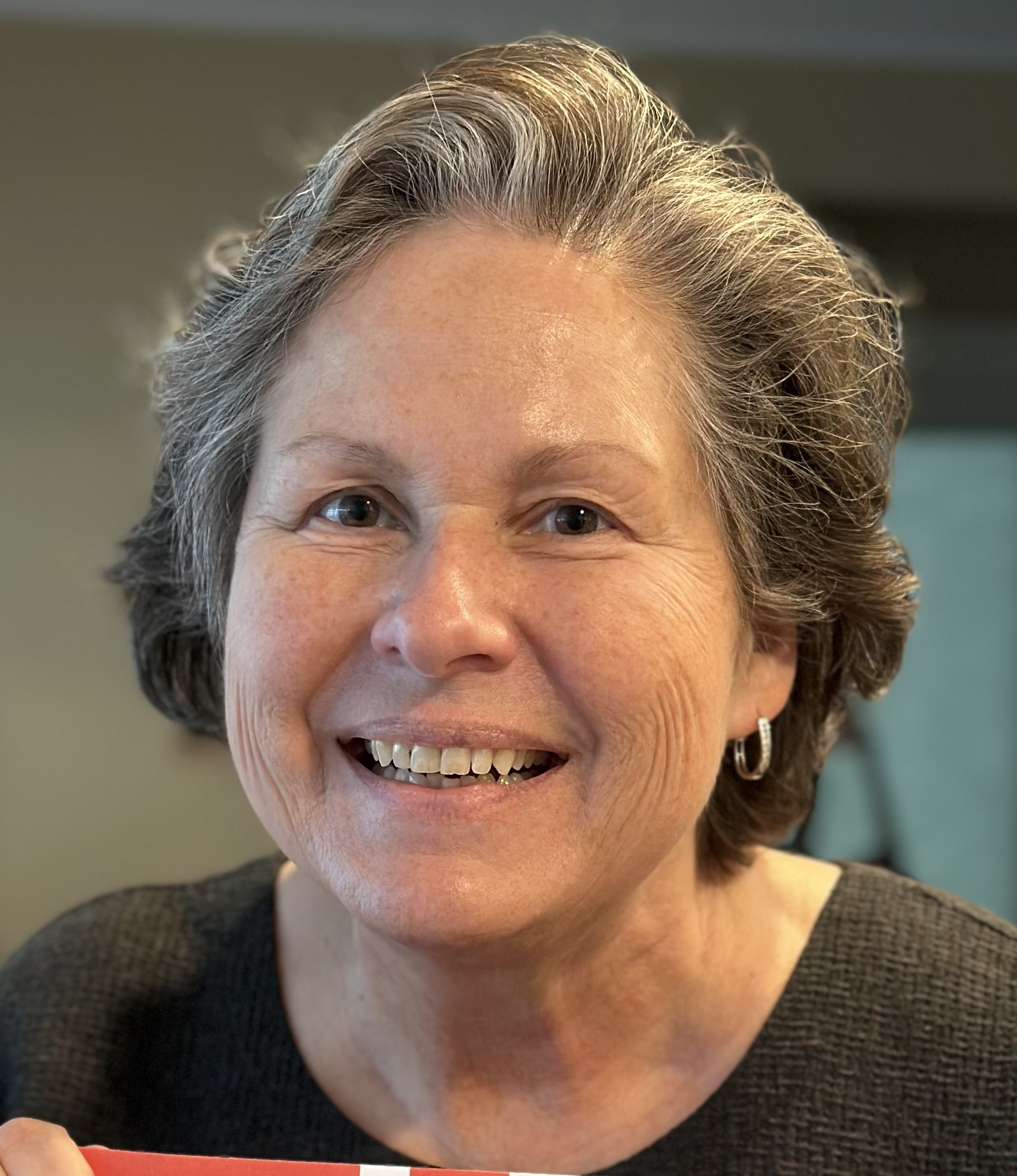
Nominee	Kim Wyman	Tina Podlodowski
Party	Republican	Democratic
Popular vote	1,713,004	1,416,299
Percentage	54.74%	45.26%
- Wyman: 50–60% 60–70% 70–80% 80–90% >90% Podlodowski: 50–60% 60–70% 70–80% 80–90% >90% Tie: 50% No data
Secretary of State before election
Kim Wyman
Republican
Elected Secretary of State
Kim Wyman
Republican

The 2016 Washington Secretary of State election was held on November 8, 2016. Incumbent Republican Kim Wyman won reelection over Democratic nominee Tina Podlodowski, the two having received the most votes in an August 2016 primary election.

Kim Wyman was endorsed by the three preceding secretaries of state (Ralph Munro, Sam Reed, and Bruce Chapman), as well as the Seattle Times, King County Director of Elections Julie Wise, Pierce County Auditor Julie Anderson, the Washington Education Association, the Rental Housing Association of Washington, and the Sheet Metal, Air, Rail and Transportation Union. As of September 2016, Wyman had raised about $395,000 for her campaign.

Tina Podlodowski was endorsed by the incumbent, and two preceding, governors of Washington (Jay Inslee, Christine Gregoire, and Gary Locke), as well as Lakewood city councilor Mary Moss, the Washington State High School Democrats, and The Stranger. As of September 2016, Podlodowski had raised about $460,000 for her campaign.

== Primary election ==
=== Endorsements ===
Kim Wyman (R)

Newspapers

- The Seattle Times

=== Results ===
County results Wyman: 40–50%; 50–60%; 60–70%; 70–80%; Podlodowski: 40–50%; 50–60%; 60–70%

Congressional district results Wyman: 40–50%; 50–60%; 60–70%; Podlodowski: 40–50%; 50–60%; 70–80%

Top-two primary results
Party	Candidate	Votes	%
Republican	Kim Wyman (incumbent)	645,614	47.90%
Democratic	Tina Podlodowski	621,732	46.13%
Libertarian	Tim Turner	80,570	5.98%
Total votes		1,347,916	100.00%

==== By county ====
County results
County	Kim Wyman Republican		Tina Podlodowski Democratic		Tim Turner Libertarian		Margin		Total votes
County	#	%	#	%	#	%	#	%	Total votes
Adams	1,489	77.23%	339	17.58%	100	5.19%	1,150	59.65%	1,928
Asotin	2,415	58.12%	1,486	35.76%	254	6.11%	929	22.36%	4,155
Benton	20,313	66.05%	8,385	27.26%	2,058	6.69%	11,928	38.78%	30,756
Chelan	9,214	64.87%	4,324	30.44%	665	4.68%	4,890	34.43%	14,203
Clallam	8,972	50.57%	7,756	43.72%	1,013	5.71%	1,216	6.85%	17,741
Clark	37,273	50.70%	31,926	43.43%	4,316	5.87%	5,347	7.27%	73,515
Columbia	694	71.18%	213	21.85%	68	6.97%	481	49.33%	975
Cowlitz	9,753	53.67%	7,069	38.90%	1,349	7.42%	2,684	14.77%	18,171
Douglas	4,832	70.86%	1,673	24.53%	314	4.60%	3,159	46.33%	6,819
Ferry	1,078	60.06%	560	31.20%	157	8.75%	518	28.86%	1,795
Franklin	5,571	67.36%	2,235	27.02%	465	5.62%	3,336	40.33%	8,271
Garfield	425	73.78%	122	21.18%	29	5.03%	303	52.60%	576
Grant	7,717	70.70%	2,499	22.90%	699	6.40%	5,218	47.81%	10,915
Grays Harbor	6,568	52.37%	5,071	40.44%	902	7.19%	1,497	11.94%	12,541
Island	10,609	49.98%	9,479	44.65%	1,140	5.37%	1,130	5.32%	21,228
Jefferson	3,596	33.54%	6,594	61.51%	530	4.94%	-2,998	-27.97%	10,720
King	150,550	35.19%	256,202	59.88%	21,091	4.93%	-105,652	-24.69%	427,843
Kitsap	25,867	48.32%	23,705	44.28%	3,961	7.40%	2,162	4.04%	53,533
Kittitas	4,932	61.87%	2,624	32.92%	416	5.22%	2,308	28.95%	7,972
Klickitat	2,524	58.08%	1,523	35.04%	299	6.88%	1,001	23.03%	4,346
Lewis	10,416	69.99%	3,616	24.30%	850	5.71%	6,800	45.69%	14,882
Lincoln	1,974	73.22%	576	21.36%	146	5.42%	1,398	51.85%	2,696
Mason	7,595	55.18%	5,239	38.06%	931	6.76%	2,356	17.12%	13,765
Okanogan	4,898	59.23%	2,834	34.27%	537	6.49%	2,064	24.96%	8,269
Pacific	2,626	49.82%	2,271	43.08%	374	7.10%	355	6.73%	5,271
Pend Oreille	1,952	59.06%	1,097	33.19%	256	7.75%	855	25.87%	3,305
Pierce	74,198	52.68%	56,978	40.45%	9,669	6.86%	17,220	12.23%	140,845
San Juan	1,762	32.03%	3,421	62.19%	318	5.78%	-1,659	-30.16%	5,501
Skagit	12,504	51.39%	10,571	43.45%	1,256	5.16%	1,933	7.94%	24,331
Skamania	1,187	54.55%	829	38.10%	160	7.35%	358	16.45%	2,176
Snohomish	68,571	49.06%	60,802	43.50%	10,396	7.44%	7,769	5.56%	139,769
Spokane	51,839	54.81%	36,450	38.54%	6,285	6.65%	15,389	16.27%	94,574
Stevens	6,910	66.04%	2,651	25.34%	902	8.62%	4,259	40.71%	10,463
Thurston	34,364	56.73%	22,906	37.81%	3,307	5.46%	11,458	18.91%	60,577
Wahkiakum	629	57.39%	395	36.04%	72	6.57%	234	21.35%	1,096
Walla Walla	6,754	60.45%	3,699	33.11%	720	6.44%	3,055	27.34%	11,173
Whatcom	21,754	46.13%	22,829	48.41%	2,575	5.46%	-1,075	-2.28%	47,158
Whitman	3,631	53.65%	2,667	39.41%	470	6.94%	964	14.24%	6,768
Yakima	17,658	64.70%	8,116	29.74%	1,520	5.57%	9,542	34.96%	27,294
Totals	645,614	47.90%	621,732	46.13%	80,570	5.98%	23,882	1.77%	1,347,916

Counties that flipped from Democratic to Republican

- Clallam (largest city: Port Angeles)
- Cowlitz (largest city: Longview)
- Grays Harbor (largest city: Aberdeen)
- Island (largest city: Oak Harbor)
- Kitsap (largest city: Bremerton)
- Mason (largest city: Shelton)
- Pacific (largest city: Raymond)
- Pierce (largest city: Tacoma)
- Skagit (largest city: Mount Vernon)
- Snohomish (largest city: Everett)
- Wahkiakum (largest city: Puget Island)

==== By congressional district ====
District	Wyman	Podlodowski	Turner	Representative
1st	51%	42%	6%	Suzan DelBene
2nd	45%	49%	7%	Rick Larsen
3rd	54%	40%	6%	Jaime Herrera Beutler
4th	66%	28%	6%	Dan Newhouse
5th	57%	36%	7%	Cathy McMorris Rodgers
6th	48%	46%	7%	Derek Kilmer
7th	25%	71%	4%	Jim McDermott
8th	57%	36%	6%	Dave Reichert
9th	37%	57%	5%	Adam Smith
10th	55%	39%	6%	Denny Heck

== General election ==
=== Polling ===
Graphical summary

View source data.

Poll source	Date(s) administered	Sample size	Margin of error	Kim Wyman (R)	Tina Podlodowski (D)	Undecided
Elway Poll	October 20–22, 2016	502 (RV)	± 4.5%	41%	37%	22%
Normington Petts & Associates (D) (Note: Poll sponsored by Podlodowski's campaign)	September 27–29, 2016	600 (LV)	± 4.0%	31%	35%	34%
Elway Poll	August 9–13, 2016	500 (RV)	± 4.5%	41%	33%	26%

=== Results ===
2016 Washington Secretary of State election
Party	Candidate	Votes	%	±%
Republican	Kim Wyman (incumbent)	1,713,004	54.74%	+4.36%
Democratic	Tina Podlodowski	1,416,299	45.26%	–4.36%
Total votes		3,129,303	100.00%	N/A
Republican hold				

==== By county ====
County results
County	Kim Wyman Republican		Tina Podlodowski Democratic		Margin		Total votes
County	#	%	#	%	#	%	Total votes
Adams	3,394	75.41%	1,107	24.59%	2,287	50.81%	4,501
Asotin	6,477	68.85%	2,930	31.15%	3,547	37.71%	9,407
Benton	57,340	72.71%	21,524	27.29%	35,816	45.41%	78,864
Chelan	22,261	68.27%	10,348	31.73%	11,913	36.53%	32,609
Clallam	22,800	59.35%	15,613	40.65%	7,187	18.71%	38,413
Clark	118,264	60.77%	76,361	39.23%	41,903	21.53%	194,625
Columbia	1,654	78.57%	451	21.43%	1,203	57.15%	2,105
Cowlitz	28,206	63.24%	16,397	36.76%	11,809	26.48%	44,603
Douglas	11,232	73.92%	3,962	26.08%	7,270	47.85%	15,194
Ferry	2,395	69.20%	1,066	30.80%	1,329	38.40%	3,461
Franklin	15,976	68.19%	7,453	31.81%	8,523	36.38%	23,429
Garfield	942	78.89%	252	21.11%	690	57.79%	1,194
Grant	20,837	75.42%	6,792	24.58%	14,045	50.83%	27,629
Grays Harbor	16,881	60.21%	11,156	39.79%	5,725	20.42%	28,037
Island	24,494	58.17%	17,613	41.83%	6,881	16.34%	42,107
Jefferson	8,475	42.44%	11,495	57.56%	-3,020	-15.12%	19,970
King	396,466	41.30%	563,438	58.70%	-166,972	-17.39%	959,904
Kitsap	69,426	56.53%	53,392	43.47%	16,034	13.06%	122,818
Kittitas	12,298	66.74%	6,129	33.26%	6,169	33.48%	18,427
Klickitat	6,593	63.24%	3,833	36.76%	2,760	26.47%	10,426
Lewis	25,134	74.30%	8,694	25.70%	16,440	48.60%	33,828
Lincoln	4,492	80.62%	1,080	19.38%	3,412	61.23%	5,572
Mason	17,295	62.39%	10,426	37.61%	6,869	24.78%	27,721
Okanogan	10,788	65.14%	5,772	34.86%	5,016	30.29%	16,560
Pacific	6,027	58.27%	4,316	41.73%	1,711	16.54%	10,343
Pend Oreille	4,715	71.39%	1,890	28.61%	2,825	42.77%	6,605
Pierce	200,835	58.76%	140,962	41.24%	59,873	17.52%	341,797
San Juan	4,044	38.30%	6,516	61.70%	-2,472	-23.41%	10,560
Skagit	32,714	59.30%	22,457	40.70%	10,257	18.59%	55,171
Skamania	3,343	62.07%	2,043	37.93%	1,300	24.14%	5,386
Snohomish	189,420	55.92%	149,325	44.08%	40,095	11.84%	338,745
Spokane	141,818	63.91%	80,092	36.09%	61,726	27.82%	221,910
Stevens	16,676	75.33%	5,460	24.67%	11,216	50.67%	22,136
Thurston	77,292	60.37%	50,743	39.63%	26,549	20.74%	128,035
Wahkiakum	1,429	64.69%	780	35.31%	649	29.38%	2,209
Walla Walla	16,698	67.86%	7,910	32.14%	8,788	35.71%	24,608
Whatcom	53,932	50.16%	53,581	49.84%	351	0.33%	107,513
Whitman	9,969	59.05%	6,913	40.95%	3,056	18.10%	16,882
Yakima	49,972	65.75%	26,027	34.25%	23,945	31.51%	75,999
Totals	1,713,004	54.74%	1,416,299	45.26%	296,705	9.48%	3,129,303

Counties that flipped from Democratic to Republican

- Pacific (largest city: Raymond)
- Snohomish (largest city: Everett)
- Whatcom (largest city: Bellingham)

==== By congressional district ====
Wyman won eight of ten congressional districts, including four that elected Democrats.

District	Wyman	Podlodowski	Representative
1st	58%	42%	Suzan DelBene
2nd	51%	49%	Rick Larsen
3rd	63%	37%	Jaime Herrera Beutler
4th	70%	30%	Dan Newhouse
5th	65%	35%	Cathy McMorris Rodgers
6th	55%	45%	Derek Kilmer
7th	31%	69%	Jim McDermott
8th	62%	38%	Dave Reichert
9th	42%	58%	Adam Smith
10th	59%	41%	Denny Heck

== See also ==
- Washington secretary of state election, 2012
