= 2020 Washington Secretary of State election =

- November 3, 2020
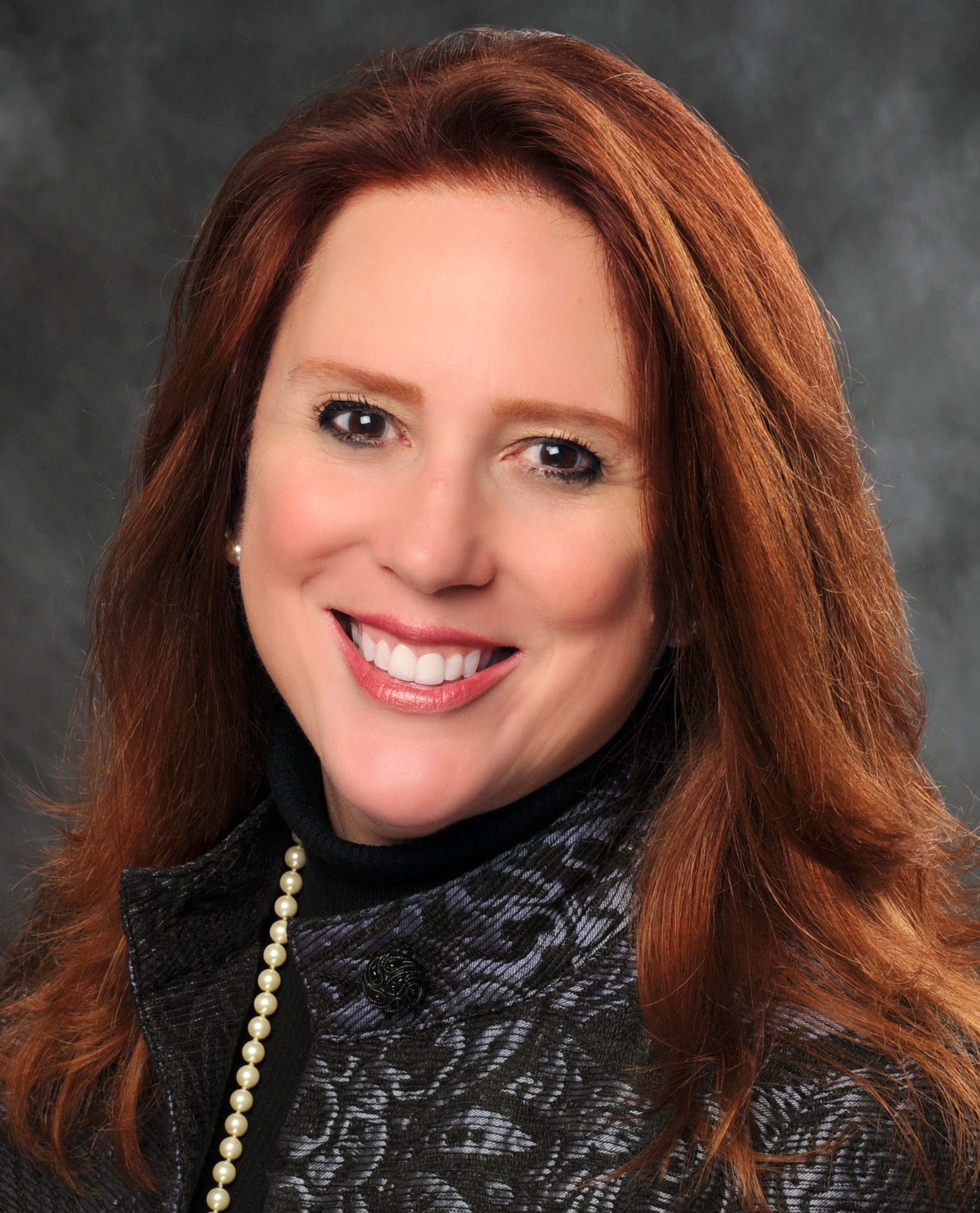

Nominee	Kim Wyman	Gael Tarleton
Party	Republican	Democratic
Popular vote	2,116,141	1,826,710
Percentage	53.61%	46.27%
- Wyman: 40–50% 50–60% 60–70% 70–80% 80–90% >90% Tarleton: 40–50% 50–60% 60–70% 70–80% 80–90% >90% Tie: 40–50% 50% No data
Secretary of State before election
Kim Wyman
Republican
Elected Secretary of State
Kim Wyman
Republican

The 2020 Washington Secretary of State election was held on November 3, 2020. Incumbent Republican Kim Wyman won reelection over Democratic nominee Gael Tarleton, the two having received the most votes in an August 2020 primary election. Wyman became the only Republican to hold statewide office in Washington and the entire West Coast. As of 2026, this was the last time a Republican won a statewide election in Washington.

== Primary election ==
=== Endorsements ===
Kim Wyman (R)

Newspapers

- The Seattle Times
Gael Tarleton (D)

Statewide officials

- Bob Ferguson, attorney general of Washington (2013–2025)

2020 Washington Secretary of State primary debate
No.	Date	Host	Moderator	Link	Republican	Democratic	Progressive	Independent
Key: P Participant A Absent N Not invited I Invited W Withdrawn								
Key: P Participant A Absent N Not invited I Invited W Withdrawn					Kim Wyman	Gael Tarleton	Gentry Lange	Ed Minger
1	Jul. 20, 2020	KSPS; League of Women Voters of Washington; The Spokesman-Review	Kristi Gorenson	YouTube	P	P	P	P

=== Results ===
County results Wyman: 50–60%; 60–70%; 70–80%; 80–90%; Tarleton: 40–50%; 50–60%; 60–70%

Congressional district results Wyman: 50–60%; 60–70%; Tarleton: 40–50%; 50–60%; 60–70%

Top-two primary results
Party	Candidate	Votes	%
Republican	Kim Wyman (incumbent)	1,238,455	50.89%
Democratic	Gael Tarleton	1,053,584	43.29%
Independent	Ed Minger	87,982	3.62%
Progressive	Gentry Lange	51,826	2.13%
Write-in		1,919	0.08%
Total votes		2,433,766	100.00%

==== By county ====
County results
County	Kim Wyman Republican		Gael Tarleton Democratic		Various candidates Other parties		Margin		Total votes
County	#	%	#	%	#	%	#	%	Total votes
Adams	2,640	78.22%	590	17.48%	145	4.30%	2,050	60.74%	3,375
Asotin	4,451	65.85%	1,910	28.26%	398	5.89%	2,541	37.59%	6,759
Benton	41,594	68.07%	15,922	26.06%	3,592	5.88%	25,672	42.01%	61,108
Chelan	18,239	66.24%	7,902	28.70%	1,395	5.07%	10,337	37.54%	27,536
Clallam	17,138	53.71%	12,892	40.40%	1,881	5.89%	4,246	13.31%	31,911
Clark	79,412	53.12%	60,747	40.64%	9,334	6.24%	18,665	12.49%	149,493
Columbia	1,252	76.25%	320	19.49%	70	4.26%	932	56.76%	1,642
Cowlitz	22,095	61.30%	11,362	31.52%	2,585	7.17%	10,733	29.78%	36,042
Douglas	9,656	72.68%	2,980	22.43%	649	4.89%	6,676	50.25%	13,285
Ferry	2,111	67.49%	850	27.17%	167	5.34%	1,261	40.31%	3,128
Franklin	12,414	67.78%	4,892	26.71%	1,009	5.51%	7,522	41.07%	18,315
Garfield	778	78.74%	163	16.50%	47	4.76%	615	62.25%	988
Grant	16,490	75.09%	4,214	19.19%	1,256	5.72%	12,276	55.90%	21,960
Grays Harbor	14,445	60.32%	7,888	32.94%	1,613	6.74%	6,557	27.38%	23,946
Island	18,497	51.86%	15,183	42.57%	1,989	5.58%	3,314	9.29%	35,669
Jefferson	6,464	37.80%	9,597	56.12%	1,041	6.09%	-3,133	-18.32%	17,102
King	273,994	37.42%	422,227	57.67%	35,942	4.91%	-148,233	-20.25%	732,163
Kitsap	48,724	50.82%	40,893	42.65%	6,258	6.53%	7,831	8.17%	95,875
Kittitas	10,384	65.27%	4,534	28.50%	992	6.24%	5,850	36.77%	15,910
Klickitat	4,924	59.63%	2,831	34.29%	502	6.08%	2,093	25.35%	8,257
Lewis	22,192	73.90%	6,119	20.38%	1,717	5.72%	16,073	53.53%	30,028
Lincoln	3,818	80.58%	736	15.53%	184	3.88%	3,082	65.05%	4,738
Mason	14,399	60.94%	7,567	32.02%	1,663	7.04%	6,832	28.91%	23,629
Okanogan	8,452	62.55%	4,330	32.05%	730	5.40%	4,122	30.51%	13,512
Pacific	4,993	54.56%	3,586	39.19%	572	6.25%	1,407	15.38%	9,151
Pend Oreille	3,682	69.60%	1,279	24.18%	329	6.22%	2,403	45.43%	5,290
Pierce	148,111	55.34%	101,989	38.11%	17,537	6.55%	46,122	17.23%	267,637
San Juan	2,872	32.24%	5,525	62.02%	511	5.74%	-2,653	-29.78%	8,908
Skagit	25,636	55.66%	17,797	38.64%	2,625	5.70%	7,839	17.02%	46,058
Skamania	2,386	57.26%	1,530	36.72%	251	6.02%	856	20.54%	4,167
Snohomish	130,108	51.03%	107,388	42.12%	17,464	6.85%	22,720	8.91%	254,960
Spokane	95,637	58.40%	58,530	35.74%	9,586	5.85%	37,107	22.66%	163,753
Stevens	13,550	74.25%	3,678	20.15%	1,021	5.59%	9,872	54.10%	18,249
Thurston	61,034	58.03%	37,716	35.86%	6,435	6.12%	23,318	22.17%	105,185
Wahkiakum	1,200	60.70%	654	33.08%	123	6.22%	546	27.62%	1,977
Walla Walla	12,027	61.55%	6,303	32.26%	1,210	6.19%	5,724	29.29%	19,540
Whatcom	42,486	46.82%	42,742	47.10%	5,513	6.08%	-256	-0.28%	90,741
Whitman	6,273	56.18%	4,095	36.68%	797	7.14%	2,178	19.51%	11,165
Yakima	33,897	66.97%	14,123	27.90%	2,594	5.13%	19,774	39.07%	50,614
Totals	1,238,455	50.89%	1,053,584	43.29%	141,727	5.82%	184,871	7.60%	2,433,766

==== By congressional district ====
District	Wyman	Tarleton	Representative
1st	53%	42%	Suzan DelBene
2nd	46%	47%	Rick Larsen
3rd	58%	36%	Jaime Herrera Beutler
4th	69%	26%	Dan Newhouse
5th	61%	33%	Cathy McMorris Rodgers
6th	51%	43%	Derek Kilmer
7th	28%	67%	Pramila Jayapal
8th	59%	35%	Kim Schrier
9th	38%	57%	Adam Smith
10th	56%	37%	Denny Heck

== General election ==
=== Predictions ===
Source	Ranking	As of
The Cook Political Report	Lean R	June 25, 2020

=== Post-primary endorsements ===
Kim Wyman (R)

Statewide officials

- Bruce Chapman, former secretary of state of Washington (1975–1981)
- Ralph Munro, former secretary of state of Washington (1981–2001)
- Sam Reed, former secretary of state of Washington (2001–2013)
Gael Tarleton (D)

U.S. senators

- Maria Cantwell, Washington (2001–present)
- Patty Murray, Washington (1993–present)

Statewide officials

- Jay Inslee, governor of Washington (2013–2025)

=== Debate ===
2020 Washington Secretary of State debate
No.	Date	Host	Moderator	Link	Republican	Democratic
Key: P Participant A Absent N Not invited I Invited W Withdrawn						
Key: P Participant A Absent N Not invited I Invited W Withdrawn					Kim Wyman	Gael Tarleton
1	Sep. 19, 2020	League of Women Voters of Washington; The Spokesman-Review	Jim Camden	YouTube	P	P

=== Polling ===
Graphical summary

View source data.

Poll source	Date(s) administered	Sample size (Note: Key: A – all adults RV – registered voters LV – likely voters V – unclear)	Margin of error	Kim Wyman (R)	Gael Tarleton (D)	Undecided
Public Policy Polling	October 14–15, 2020	610 (LV)	± 4%	49%	43%	8%
SurveyUSA	October 8–10, 2020	591 (LV)	± 5.2%	45%	40%	14%

=== Results ===
2020 Washington Secretary of State election
Party	Candidate	Votes	%	±%
Republican	Kim Wyman (incumbent)	2,116,141	53.61%	–1.13%
Democratic	Gael Tarleton	1,826,710	46.27%	+1.01%
Write-in		4,666	0.12%	N/A
Total votes		3,947,517	100.00%	N/A
Republican hold				

==== By county ====
County results
County	Kim Wyman Republican		Gael Tarleton Democratic		Write-in Various		Margin		Total votes
County	#	%	#	%	#	%	#	%	Total votes
Adams	4,188	73.73%	1,473	25.93%	19	0.33%	2,715	47.80%	5,680
Asotin	7,935	68.70%	3,587	31.06%	28	0.24%	4,348	37.65%	11,550
Benton	69,494	69.99%	29,698	29.91%	106	0.11%	39,796	40.08%	99,298
Chelan	27,338	65.19%	14,565	34.73%	33	0.08%	12,773	30.46%	41,936
Clallam	27,675	57.77%	20,181	42.13%	50	0.10%	7,494	15.64%	47,906
Clark	148,502	56.58%	113,626	43.29%	329	0.13%	34,876	13.29%	262,457
Columbia	1,880	78.11%	525	21.81%	2	0.08%	1,355	56.29%	2,407
Cowlitz	37,669	65.02%	20,199	34.87%	64	0.11%	17,470	30.16%	57,932
Douglas	14,630	70.83%	5,999	29.05%	25	0.12%	8,631	41.79%	20,654
Ferry	2,949	70.16%	1,246	29.65%	8	0.19%	1,703	40.52%	4,203
Franklin	20,478	64.74%	11,115	35.14%	36	0.11%	9,363	29.60%	31,629
Garfield	1,113	78.55%	301	21.24%	3	0.21%	812	57.30%	1,417
Grant	26,794	73.15%	9,764	26.66%	70	0.19%	17,030	46.49%	36,628
Grays Harbor	23,509	62.82%	13,854	37.02%	57	0.15%	9,655	25.80%	37,420
Island	29,295	56.06%	22,895	43.82%	63	0.12%	6,400	12.25%	52,253
Jefferson	10,063	41.42%	14,217	58.52%	14	0.06%	-4,154	-17.10%	24,294
King	482,387	41.36%	682,761	58.54%	1,189	0.10%	-200,374	-17.18%	1,166,337
Kitsap	83,886	54.57%	69,638	45.30%	205	0.13%	14,248	9.27%	153,729
Kittitas	17,007	66.67%	8,487	33.27%	17	0.07%	8,520	33.40%	25,511
Klickitat	8,022	61.36%	5,025	38.44%	26	0.20%	2,997	22.93%	13,073
Lewis	32,661	74.07%	11,353	25.75%	79	0.18%	21,308	48.33%	44,093
Lincoln	5,485	79.84%	1,378	20.06%	7	0.10%	4,107	59.78%	6,870
Mason	22,891	63.28%	13,216	36.53%	69	0.19%	9,675	26.74%	36,176
Okanogan	12,949	62.80%	7,651	37.11%	18	0.09%	5,298	25.70%	20,618
Pacific	7,935	58.13%	5,685	41.65%	31	0.23%	2,250	16.48%	13,651
Pend Oreille	5,992	72.48%	2,261	27.35%	14	0.17%	3,731	45.13%	8,267
Pierce	257,698	57.28%	191,684	42.61%	498	0.11%	66,014	14.67%	449,880
San Juan	4,670	36.58%	8,089	63.35%	9	0.07%	-3,419	-26.78%	12,768
Skagit	40,861	58.09%	29,398	41.79%	81	0.12%	11,463	16.30%	70,340
Skamania	4,251	60.23%	2,793	39.57%	14	0.20%	1,458	20.66%	7,058
Snohomish	230,222	54.14%	194,563	45.75%	464	0.11%	35,659	8.39%	425,249
Spokane	171,171	60.34%	112,056	39.50%	462	0.16%	59,115	20.84%	283,689
Stevens	20,963	75.83%	6,656	24.08%	27	0.10%	14,307	51.75%	27,646
Thurston	97,311	59.64%	65,627	40.22%	224	0.14%	31,684	19.42%	163,162
Wahkiakum	1,872	65.39%	984	34.37%	7	0.24%	888	31.02%	2,863
Walla Walla	19,728	65.35%	10,430	34.55%	32	0.11%	9,298	30.80%	30,190
Whatcom	65,592	48.41%	69,728	51.46%	171	0.13%	-4,136	-3.05%	135,491
Whitman	11,290	55.58%	8,994	44.28%	29	0.14%	2,296	11.30%	20,313
Yakima	57,785	62.22%	35,008	37.69%	86	0.09%	22,777	24.52%	92,879
Totals	2,116,141	53.61%	1,826,710	46.27%	4,666	0.12%	289,431	7.33%	3,947,517

Counties that flipped from Republican to Democratic

- Whatcom (largest city: Bellingham)

==== By congressional district ====
Wyman won seven of ten congressional districts, including four that elected Democrats.

District	Wyman	Tarleton	Representative
1st	55%	45%	Suzan DelBene
2nd	49%	51%	Rick Larsen
3rd	60%	40%	Jaime Herrera Beutler
4th	67%	33%	Dan Newhouse
5th	63%	37%	Cathy McMorris Rodgers
6th	54%	46%	Derek Kilmer
7th	32%	68%	Pramila Jayapal
8th	61%	39%	Kim Schrier
9th	41%	59%	Adam Smith
10th	58%	42%	Denny Heck
10th	58%	42%	Marilyn Strickland
