= 2024 Washington lieutenant gubernatorial election =

- November 5, 2024
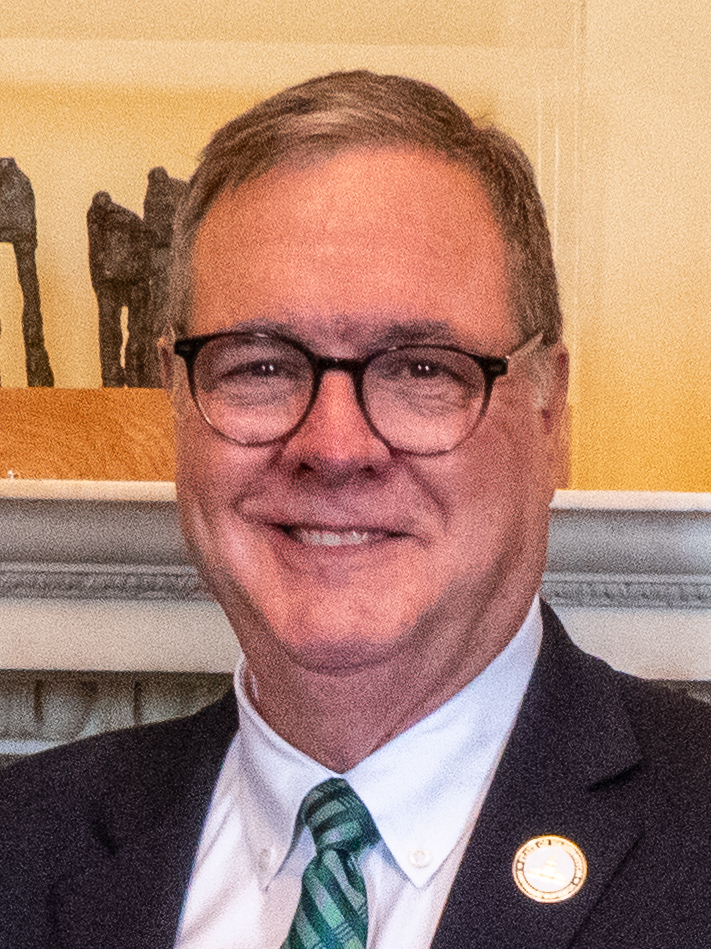

Nominee	Denny Heck	Dan Matthews
Party	Democratic	Republican
Popular vote	2,112,132	1,674,025
Percentage	55.72%	44.16%
- Heck: 50–60% 60–70% 70–80% 80–90% >90% Matthews: 40–50% 50–60% 60–70% 70–80% 80–90% >90% Tie: 40–50% 50% No votes
Lieutenant Governor before election
Denny Heck
Democratic
Elected Lieutenant Governor
Denny Heck
Democratic

The 2024 Washington lieutenant gubernatorial election was held on November 5, 2024. The top-two primary was held on August 6. Washington is one of two states that holds a top-two primary, meaning that all candidates are listed on the same ballot regardless of party affiliation, and the top two move on to the general election.

Incumbent Democratic Lieutenant Governor Denny Heck was re-elected to a second term in office, defeating Republican retired pilot Dan Matthews.

== Candidates ==
=== Democratic Party ===
==== Advanced to general ====
- Denny Heck, incumbent lieutenant governor

==== Eliminated in primary ====
- David Griffin, businessman

=== Republican Party ===
==== Advanced to general ====
- Dan Matthews, retired pilot and perennial candidate

==== Eliminated in primary ====
- Bob Hagglund, IT professional and candidate for secretary of state in 2022 and 2024

=== Independents ===
==== Eliminated in primary ====
- Patrick Harman (Liberal Republican (Note: Not an actual political party. In Washington, independent candidates are allowed to choose a ballot label)), retired National Oceanic and Atmospheric Administration official

== Primary election ==
=== Endorsements ===
Denny Heck (D)

Newspapers

- The Seattle Times
- The Stranger

=== Polling ===
Poll source	Date(s) administered	Sample size (Note: Key: A – all adults RV – registered voters LV – likely voters V – unclear)	Margin of error	Denny Heck (D)	David Griffin (D)	Bob Hagglund (R)	Patrick Harman (R)	Dan Matthews (R)	Undecided
Public Policy Polling (D) (Note: Poll sponsored by the Northwest Progressive Institute)	July 24–25, 2024	581 (LV)	± 4.0%	24%	8%	9%	3%	13%	43%

=== Results ===
County results Heck: 30–40%; 40–50%; 50–60%; 60–70%; Matthews: 30–40%; 40–50%; Hagglund: 30–40%

Congressional district results Heck: 30–40%; 40–50%; 50–60%; 70–80%; Matthews: 30–40%

Blanket primary election results
Party	Candidate	Votes	%
Democratic	Denny Heck (incumbent)	927,395	48.62%
Republican	Dan Matthews	438,537	22.99%
Republican	Bob Hagglund	319,071	16.73%
Democratic	David Griffin	169,759	8.90%
Liberal Republican	Patrick Harman	50,330	2.64%
Write-in		2,538	0.13%
Total votes		1,907,630	100.00%

==== By county ====
Combined partisan vote by county Democratic: 40–50%; 50–60%; 60–70%; 70–80%; Republican: 50–60%; 60–70%; 70–80%; 80–90%

Combined partisan vote by congressional district Democratic: 50–60%; 60–70%; 70–80%; 80–90%; Republican: 50–60%; 60–70%

County results
County	Denny Heck Democratic		Dan Matthews Republican		Bob Hagglund Republican		David Griffin Democratic		Other candidates Various parties		Margin		Total votes
County	#	%	#	%	#	%	#	%	#	%	#	%	Total votes
Adams	350	14.66%	1,066	44.64%	644	26.97%	182	7.62%	146	6.11%	-422	-17.67%	2,388
Asotin	1,339	24.11%	1,971	35.49%	1,478	26.61%	593	10.68%	173	3.11%	-493	-8.88%	5,554
Benton	13,027	26.62%	20,096	41.06%	10,356	21.16%	3,847	7.86%	1,618	3.31%	-7,069	-14.44%	48,944
Chelan	6,756	31.78%	6,047	28.44%	5,735	26.98%	2,088	9.82%	633	2.98%	709	3.34%	21,259
Clallam	12,974	45.57%	7,320	25.71%	4,607	16.18%	2,629	9.23%	943	3.31%	5,654	19.86%	28,473
Clark	56,603	43.40%	36,717	28.15%	23,148	17.75%	10,841	8.31%	3,118	2.39%	19,886	15.25%	130,427
Columbia	207	16.67%	524	42.19%	320	25.76%	119	9.58%	72	5.80%	-204	-16.43%	1,242
Cowlitz	8,100	28.88%	9,620	34.30%	5,651	20.15%	3,214	11.46%	1,464	5.22%	-1,520	-5.42%	28,049
Douglas	2,490	23.94%	3,574	34.37%	3,199	30.76%	801	7.70%	335	3.22%	-375	-3.61%	10,399
Ferry	461	19.97%	772	33.43%	722	31.27%	239	10.35%	115	4.98%	-50	-2.17%	2,309
Franklin	3,045	22.05%	5,973	43.26%	3,034	21.97%	1,358	9.83%	398	2.88%	-2,928	-21.21%	13,808
Garfield	83	12.03%	261	37.83%	268	38.84%	46	6.67%	32	4.64%	-7	-1.01%	690
Grant	2,622	16.29%	6,237	38.75%	4,992	31.02%	1,517	9.43%	726	4.51%	-1,245	-7.74%	16,094
Grays Harbor	7,141	37.37%	4,907	25.68%	4,002	20.95%	2,060	10.78%	997	5.22%	2,234	11.69%	19,107
Island	13,593	46.18%	6,736	22.88%	5,118	17.39%	3,186	10.82%	804	2.73%	6,857	23.29%	29,437
Jefferson	10,094	64.89%	2,164	13.91%	1,583	10.18%	1,412	9.08%	303	1.95%	7,930	50.98%	15,556
King	356,195	66.35%	67,538	12.58%	55,567	10.35%	46,473	8.66%	11,091	2.07%	288,657	53.77%	536,864
Kitsap	39,371	48.22%	15,112	18.51%	15,975	19.56%	8,810	10.79%	2,383	2.92%	23,396	28.65%	81,651
Kittitas	3,460	30.26%	3,820	33.40%	2,652	23.19%	1,091	9.54%	413	3.61%	-360	-3.15%	11,436
Klickitat	2,579	35.14%	2,383	32.47%	1,664	22.67%	521	7.10%	192	2.62%	196	2.67%	7,339
Lewis	6,013	26.04%	7,973	34.53%	6,361	27.55%	1,542	6.68%	1,199	5.19%	-1,612	-6.98%	23,088
Lincoln	571	14.93%	1,683	44.00%	1,194	31.22%	214	5.59%	163	4.26%	-489	-12.78%	3,825
Mason	7,359	38.15%	4,765	24.70%	4,108	21.30%	2,186	11.33%	871	4.52%	2,594	13.45%	19,289
Okanogan	3,650	31.55%	3,417	29.53%	3,289	28.43%	919	7.94%	295	2.55%	233	2.01%	11,570
Pacific	3,004	37.82%	1,907	24.01%	1,648	20.75%	961	12.10%	422	5.31%	1,097	13.81%	7,942
Pend Oreille	1,020	23.42%	1,720	39.49%	1,127	25.87%	324	7.44%	165	3.79%	-593	-13.61%	4,356
Pierce	95,986	46.64%	49,948	24.27%	38,431	18.67%	15,195	7.38%	6,230	3.03%	46,038	22.37%	205,790
San Juan	4,850	63.64%	841	11.04%	900	11.81%	838	11.00%	192	2.52%	3,950	51.83%	7,621
Skagit	16,224	44.96%	9,695	26.86%	6,237	17.28%	3,149	8.73%	784	2.17%	6,529	18.09%	36,089
Skamania	1,369	34.61%	1,042	26.35%	1,036	26.19%	329	8.32%	179	4.53%	327	8.27%	3,955
Snohomish	92,387	47.05%	41,502	21.14%	36,768	18.72%	20,300	10.34%	5,401	2.75%	50,885	25.91%	196,358
Spokane	49,960	35.76%	48,081	34.42%	24,574	17.59%	12,941	9.26%	4,146	2.97%	1,879	1.35%	139,702
Stevens	2,970	19.34%	6,452	42.02%	4,524	29.47%	933	6.08%	474	3.09%	-1,928	-12.56%	15,353
Thurston	47,977	55.98%	17,783	20.75%	12,646	14.75%	5,251	6.13%	2,053	2.40%	30,194	35.23%	85,710
Wahkiakum	526	30.58%	498	28.95%	434	25.23%	201	11.69%	61	3.55%	28	1.63%	1,720
Walla Walla	4,522	31.69%	4,415	30.94%	3,022	21.18%	1,630	11.42%	682	4.78%	107	0.75%	14,271
Whatcom	35,165	50.35%	16,915	24.22%	9,738	13.94%	6,388	9.15%	1,638	2.35%	18,250	26.13%	69,844
Whitman	3,001	33.78%	2,667	30.02%	1,655	18.63%	1,148	12.92%	412	4.64%	334	3.76%	8,883
Yakima	10,351	25.10%	14,395	34.91%	10,664	25.86%	4,283	10.39%	1,545	3.75%	-3,731	-9.05%	41,238
Totals	927,395	48.62%	438,537	22.99%	319,071	16.73%	169,759	8.90%	52,868	2.77%	488,858	25.63%	1,907,630

Counties that flipped from Republican to Democratic

- Clark (largest city: Vancouver)

==== By congressional district ====
District	Heck	Matthews	Hagglund	Griffin	Representative
1st	52%	19%	16%	10%	Suzan DelBene
2nd	50%	22%	15%	10%	Rick Larsen
3rd	38%	30%	20%	9%	Marie Gluesenkamp Perez
4th	25%	37%	25%	9%	Dan Newhouse
5th	32%	35%	20%	9%	Cathy McMorris Rodgers
6th	49%	20%	18%	10%	Derek Kilmer
7th	80%	6%	5%	7%	Pramila Jayapal
8th	42%	25%	21%	8%	Kim Schrier
9th	60%	15%	12%	11%	Adam Smith
10th	52%	22%	16%	7%	Marilyn Strickland

== General election ==
=== Polling ===
Poll source	Date(s) administered	Sample size	Margin of error	Denny Heck (D)	Dan Matthews (R)	Undecided
ActiVote	October 3–29, 2024	400 (LV)	± 4.9%	61%	39%	–
Public Policy Polling (D)	October 14–15, 2024	610 (LV)	± 4%	47%	35%	18%

=== Predictions ===
Source	Ranking	As of
Sabato's Crystal Ball	Safe D	July 25, 2024

=== Results ===
2024 Washington lieutenant gubernatorial election
Party	Candidate	Votes	%	±%
Democratic	Denny Heck (incumbent)	2,112,132	55.72%	+1.33%
Republican	Dan Matthews	1,674,025	44.16%	–1.45%
Write-in		4,376	0.12%	N/A
Total votes		3,790,533	100.00%	N/A
Democratic hold				

==== By county ====
County	Denny Heck Democratic		Dan Matthews Republican		Write-in Various		Margin		Total
County	#	%	#	%	#	%	#	%	Total
Adams	1,281	24.62%	3,913	75.19%	10	0.19%	-2,632	-50.58%	5,204
Asotin	3,735	33.71%	7,327	66.12%	19	0.17%	-3,592	-32.42%	11,081
Benton	34,049	34.93%	63,309	64.96%	107	0.11%	-29,260	-30.02%	97,465
Chelan	16,731	40.88%	24,144	58.99%	55	0.13%	-7,413	-18.11%	40,930
Clallam	23,930	50.85%	23,095	49.07%	39	0.08%	835	1.77%	47,064
Clark	134,213	50.63%	130,541	49.24%	339	0.13%	3,672	1.39%	265,093
Columbia	588	24.58%	1,801	75.29%	3	0.13%	-1,213	-50.71%	2,392
Cowlitz	21,753	37.79%	35,757	62.11%	58	0.10%	-14,004	-24.33%	57,568
Douglas	6,769	32.90%	13,769	66.92%	36	0.17%	-7,000	-34.02%	20,574
Ferry	1,201	29.93%	2,810	70.02%	2	0.05%	-1,609	-40.09%	4,013
Franklin	10,997	35.74%	19,756	64.20%	20	0.06%	-8,759	-28.46%	30,773
Garfield	288	21.54%	1,049	78.46%	0	0.00%	-761	-56.92%	1,337
Grant	9,763	27.79%	25,347	72.14%	24	0.07%	-15,584	-44.36%	35,134
Grays Harbor	16,629	45.13%	20,162	54.72%	57	0.15%	-3,533	-9.59%	36,848
Island	27,581	54.18%	23,266	45.71%	57	0.11%	4,315	8.48%	50,904
Jefferson	17,082	70.21%	7,224	29.69%	24	0.10%	9,858	40.52%	24,330
King	788,503	72.34%	299,989	27.52%	1,496	0.14%	488,514	44.82%	1,089,988
Kitsap	85,961	56.33%	66,454	43.55%	180	0.12%	19,507	12.78%	152,595
Kittitas	9,731	38.11%	15,774	61.78%	29	0.11%	-6,043	-23.67%	25,534
Klickitat	5,489	41.66%	7,679	58.28%	7	0.05%	-2,190	-16.62%	13,175
Lewis	14,050	31.87%	30,002	68.05%	35	0.08%	-15,952	-36.18%	44,087
Lincoln	1,483	21.16%	5,512	78.64%	14	0.20%	-4,029	-57.48%	7,009
Mason	16,490	46.30%	19,078	53.56%	51	0.14%	-2,588	-7.27%	35,619
Okanogan	7,921	39.34%	12,197	60.58%	16	0.08%	-4,276	-21.24%	20,134
Pacific	6,609	47.80%	7,193	52.03%	24	0.17%	-584	-4.22%	13,826
Pend Oreille	2,293	27.51%	6,025	72.29%	16	0.19%	-3,732	-44.78%	8,334
Pierce	222,716	52.36%	202,187	47.53%	446	0.10%	20,529	4.83%	425,349
San Juan	9,041	72.72%	3,372	27.12%	20	0.16%	5,669	45.60%	12,433
Skagit	34,191	50.56%	33,389	49.37%	48	0.07%	802	1.19%	67,628
Skamania	2,980	42.09%	4,096	57.85%	4	0.06%	-1,116	-15.76%	7,080
Snohomish	220,692	55.17%	178,918	44.73%	415	0.10%	41,774	10.44%	400,025
Spokane	119,911	43.26%	157,066	56.67%	192	0.07%	-37,155	-13.41%	277,169
Stevens	6,813	24.67%	20,764	75.18%	42	0.15%	-13,951	-50.51%	27,619
Thurston	94,036	58.59%	66,302	41.31%	154	0.10%	27,734	17.28%	160,492
Wahkiakum	1,137	38.52%	1,811	61.35%	4	0.14%	-674	-22.83%	2,952
Walla Walla	12,018	41.76%	16,753	58.21%	9	0.03%	-4,735	-16.45%	28,780
Whatcom	79,713	59.35%	54,457	40.55%	134	0.10%	25,256	18.81%	134,304
Whitman	9,618	49.55%	9,772	50.35%	20	0.10%	-154	-0.79%	19,410
Yakima	34,146	39.58%	51,965	60.23%	170	0.20%	-17,819	-20.65%	86,281
Totals	2,112,132	55.72%	1,674,025	44.16%	4,376	0.12%	438,107	11.56%	3,790,533

Counties that flipped from Republican to Democratic

- Clallam (largest city: Port Angeles)
- Clark (largest city: Vancouver)
- Skagit (largest city: Mount Vernon)

==== By congressional district ====
Heck won six of ten congressional districts, with the remaining four going to Matthews, including two that elected Democrats.

District	Heck	Matthews	Representative
1st	60%	40%	Suzan DelBene
2nd	58%	42%	Rick Larsen
3rd	46%	54%	Marie Gluesenkamp Perez
4th	36%	64%	Dan Newhouse
5th	40%	59%	Cathy McMorris Rodgers (118th Congress)
5th	40%	59%	Michael Baumgartner (119th Congress)
6th	56%	44%	Derek Kilmer (118th Congress)
6th	56%	44%	Emily Randall (119th Congress)
7th	85%	15%	Pramila Jayapal
8th	48%	52%	Kim Schrier
9th	68%	32%	Adam Smith
10th	57%	43%	Marilyn Strickland

== Notes ==
Partisan clients
