= Steve Hobbs (Washington politician) =

16th secretary of state of Washington

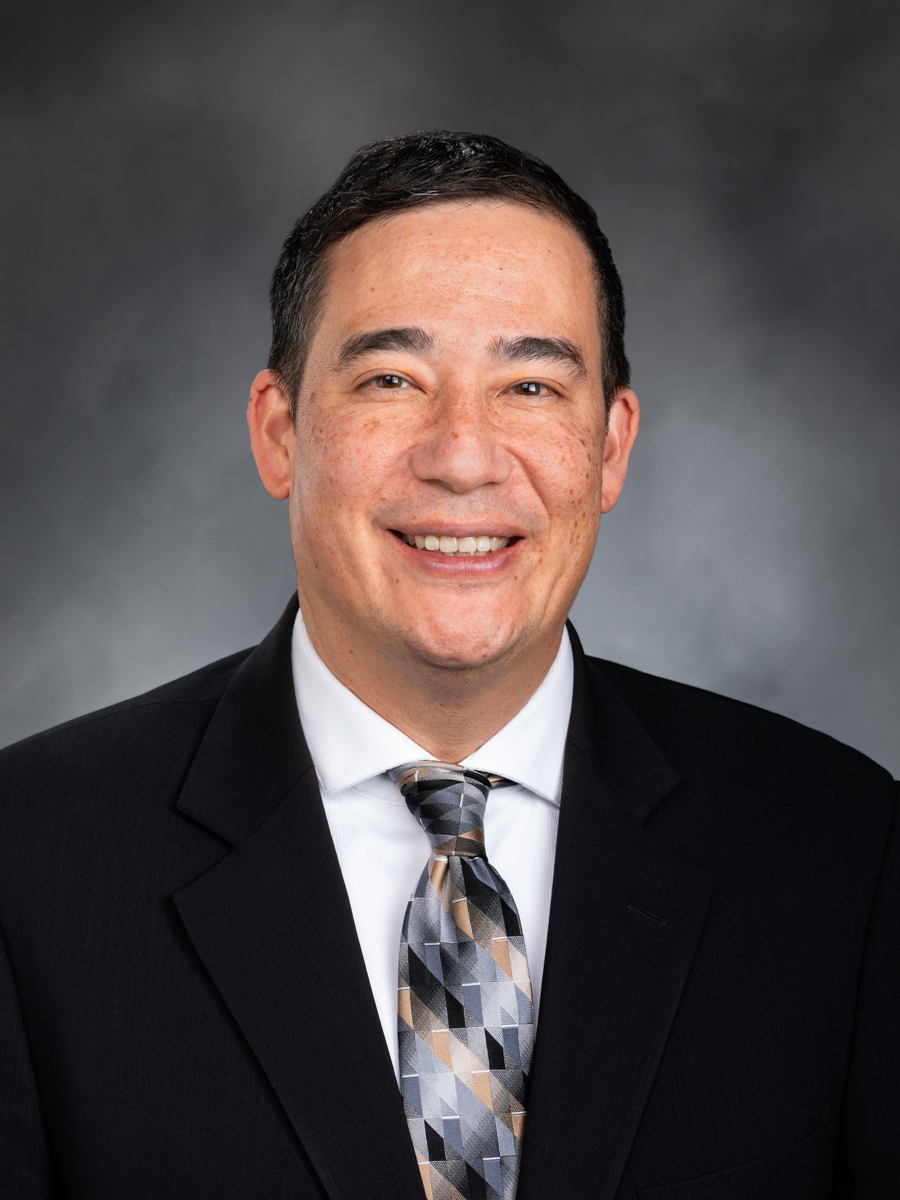

16th Secretary of State of Washington
- Incumbent
- Assumed office November 22, 2021
- Governor: Jay Inslee; Bob Ferguson
- Preceded by: Kim Wyman

Member of the Washington Senate from the 44th district
- In office January 8, 2007 – November 22, 2021
- Preceded by: Dave Schmidt
- Succeeded by: John Lovick

Personal details
- Born: Steven Ryuma Hobbs; February 12, 1970 (age 56) Everett, Washington, U.S.
- Party: Democratic (1992–present)
- Other political affiliations: Republican (before 1992)
- Spouse: Pam Hobbs (m. 1995)
- Children: 3
- Education: Everett Community College (AA); University of Washington (BA, MPA); U.S. Army War College (MSS)

Military service
- Allegiance: United States
- Branch/service: United States Army
- Years of service: 1987–present
- Rank: Lieutenant Colonel
- Unit: Washington Army National Guard

Steven Ryuma Hobbs (born February 12, 1970) is an American military officer and politician serving as the 16th secretary of state of Washington since 2021. A member of the Democratic Party, he previously served as a member of the Washington State Senate, representing the 44th district from 2007 to 2021. In 2021, Governor Jay Inslee named Hobbs to succeed the departing Kim Wyman as Secretary of State of Washington; he is the first Democrat in the state to serve in the position since Victor Aloysius Meyers left the office in 1965.

== Early life and education ==
Hobbs, whose mother is of Japanese descent, was born in Everett, Washington. He received an associate degree from Everett Community College. After completing his associate degree, he attended the University of Washington, where he earned a bachelor's degree in political science and a Master of Public Administration from the Daniel J. Evans School of Public Policy and Governance.

== Political career ==
In 2006, Hobbs was elected as state senator representing Washington's 44th legislative district. He served as the top Democrat on the Transportation Committee, he also served on the Financial Institutions & Insurance Committee as well as the Agriculture, Water & Rural Economic Development Committee.

In 2015, Hobbs led the bipartisan Joint Transportation Committee in passing transportation revenue package brought a $16 billion investment to public infrastructure and authorized voter-approved Sound Transit light rail expansion. After finishing fourth in the 2016 Washington lieutenant gubernatorial election, Hobbs announced a campaign for the 2020 election, but withdrew in mid-May 2020.

Governor Jay Inslee named Hobbs to succeed the departing Kim Wyman as Secretary of State of Washington; Hobbs took office on November 22, 2021. He subsequently won a 2022 special election to complete the remainder of Wyman's term. Hobbs was elected to a full term in 2024 with 59% of the vote, winning by the largest margin for a statewide Democrat that year.

== Military career ==
Hobbs enlisted in the US Army as private at the age of 17. He served two tours of duty in Kosovo and Iraq, respectively. During his time as an infantry officer, Hobbs took on many roles including:

- Platoon leader during peacekeeping operations in Kosovo
- Brigade Staff Officer for 1st Brigade—Armored Division
- Executive Officer for Headquarters Company—1 -36 Infantry
- Company Commander—Delta Company—2-34 Infantry
- Security Officer—Anti-Terrorism Protection Cell—Multi-National Force Iraq

He is currently a lieutenant colonel in the US Army National Guard, assigned to the Washington Army National Guard.

== Personal life ==
Hobbs has been married to Pam Hobbs since 1995. They reside in Lake Stevens, Washington with their three sons.

Washington State Senate
Preceded by Dave Schmidt	Member of the Washington State Senate from the 44th district 2007–2021	Succeeded by John Lovick
Political offices
Preceded by Kim Wyman	Secretary of State of Washington; 2021–present	Incumbent
