= Gael Tarleton =

American politician from Washington

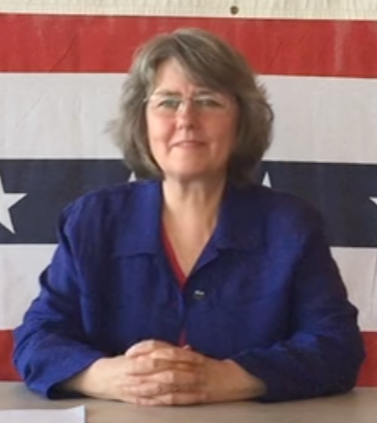
- In a 2018 video

Member of the Washington House of Representatives from the 36th district
- In office January 14, 2013 – January 11, 2021
- Preceded by: Mary Lou Dickerson
- Succeeded by: Liz Berry

Member of the Seattle Port Commission Position 2
- In office January 1, 2008 – January 31, 2013
- Preceded by: Bob Edwards
- Succeeded by: Courtney Gregoire

Personal details
- Born: Gael Frances Donelan; January 1, 1959 (age 67) Beverly, Massachusetts, U.S.
- Party: Democratic
- Spouse: Robert Tarleton
- Education: Georgetown University (BS, MA)
- Website: Government website

Gael Frances Donelan Tarleton (née Donelan; January 1, 1959) is an American politician who served as a member of the Washington House of Representatives for the 36th Legislative District from 2013 to 2021. She was a candidate for Secretary of State of Washington in 2020, losing to incumbent Republican Kim Wyman.

== Early life and education ==
Gael Tarleton was born on January 1, 1959, in Beverly, Massachusetts, the daughter of John J. "Jack" and Ann-Jean Donelan. She was raised in Manchester-by-the-Sea, Massachusetts, and graduated as class valedictorian and Manchester Scholar from Manchester Jr.-Sr. High School in 1977. Years later, she organized a group of her high school classmates and their parents to establish the Timothy C. Averill Debate Education Fund in honor of her debate coach and English teacher, Tim Averill, when he retired.

Tarleton attended the School of Foreign Service at Georgetown University, where she studied Russian language and earned a Bachelor of Science degree. She graduated in 1981, cum laude, and earned an additional honors certificate in international business diplomacy and membership in Phi Alpha Theta. In 1983, she earned a Master's degree in government and national security studies from Georgetown.

== Career ==
During college, Tarleton worked in the office of a member of the United States House of Representatives and at the United States Department of the Treasury in the National Security Affairs office.

=== Defense Intelligence Agency ===
Following her graduation from Georgetown University, Tarleton joined the Defense Intelligence Agency, Washington, D.C., where she worked as a specialist in Soviet strategic issues for nine years. From September 1983 to August 1984, the Defense Intelligence Agency granted her a one-year leave of absence to accompany her husband during his one-year assignment to the US Naval Postgraduate School in Monterey, California. During that year, she worked part-time as an Adjunct Research Instructor for the Postgraduate School's National Security Affairs Department. In 1984, Tarleton returned to the Defense Intelligence Agency's Washington, D.C., headquarters, where she held various positions supporting defense agencies and the US national intelligence community. In 1989, she was awarded the Director of Central Intelligence's National Intelligence Medal of Achievement.

=== Science Applications International Corporation ===
In September 1990, Tarleton and her husband moved to Seattle, Washington, where she worked for 12 years at Science Applications International Corporation (SAIC), which at the time was a private, employee-owned science and technology company. She developed and led the organization's business in Russia, serving as Director of SAIC Global Technology, and vice president and manager of international business, building collaborative science and technology partnerships between US and Russian scientists and engineers. Tarleton became the first American woman to address a joint session of the Russian Parliament in 1996.

=== National Bureau of Asian Research ===
In August 2002, Tarleton began serving as the Director of Eurasian Policy Studies at the National Bureau of Asian Research in Seattle.

=== University of Washington ===
In 2004, Tarleton was hired as the first Director of Corporate and Foundation Relations for the University of Washington's College of Arts and Sciences. During her employment with the University of Washington, she helped establish the endowed Herbert J. Ellison Center for Russian, East European and Central Asian Studies and the Institute for National Security Education and Research. She also served as a Special Assistant in the Office of the Vice Provost for Global Affairs; Manager of Partnerships for the Pacific Rim Visualization and Analytics Center in the College of Engineering; and Strategic Advisor for the Information School's Institute for National Security Education and Research. She helped raise funding for research and education on behalf of faculty and students. Tarleton resigned from the UW when she was elected to the State House of Representatives in 2012.

=== Port of Seattle ===
In 2007, Tarleton challenged a two-term incumbent and won her first four-year term as a Commissioner at the Port of Seattle, a King County-wide elected office for a part-time position overseeing the largest port in the Pacific Northwest with an annual budget nearing $1 billion. The five-member commission employs a port executive to manage Sea-Tac International Airport, Fishermen's Terminal, Shilshole Bay Marina, cruise and grain terminals, and four shipping container terminals in Elliott Bay. Re-elected in 2011, Tarleton held various leadership positions, including Chair of the Commission Audit Committee and President of the commission. During her tenure, the commission introduced numerous reforms to expand commission and staff accountability and transparency; invested in clean air programs; adopted an innovative aviation clean fuels strategy; and spent tens of million of dollars to begin early-action clean-up of the Lower Duwamish River, a Superfund clean-up site. The commission also initiated the Century Agenda to help create an additional 100,000 jobs in the maritime, aerospace, fishing, seafood, and manufacturing-industrial sectors in the coming 25 years.

=== Board memberships ===
Tarleton is a volunteer board member at The Ploughshares Fund, Women Legislators' Lobby (WiLL) and Women's Actions for New Directions, Northwest Progressive Institute, Earth and Space Research, and Metropolitan Democratic Club of Seattle. She previously served a three-year term (2009–2011) on the National Security Directorate's Advisory Committee at the Department of Energy's Pacific Northwest National Laboratory.

=== Washington House of Representatives ===
First elected in 2012, Tarleton serves Washington's 36th Legislative District, covering the neighborhoods of Ballard, Magnolia, and Queen Anne in Seattle. This district is the center of the state's maritime and fishing industrial base with the homeport of the North Pacific fishing fleet and other maritime industries, cruise ships, grain terminals, and two public marinas – all of which are operated by the Port of Seattle, the largest public port district in the Pacific Northwest. Prior to election to the state legislature, Tarleton served for five years as an elected Port of Seattle commissioner.

Tarleton's colleagues elected her House Majority Floor Leader in November 2015 after serving as Deputy Majority Floor Leader during the 2015 legislative sessions. She also is vice chair of the Technology and Economic Development Committee and a member of the House Higher Education, Rules, and Transportation committees.

Four of the bills Tarleton has prime-sponsored have become law: HB 1647, the Safe Keys Act requiring landlords to protect renters' keys; HB 2580, a legislative task force analyzing the economic resilience of maritime and manufacturing sectors in Washington; HB 2351, authorizing out-of-state health care professionals to volunteer services in Washington; and HB 2708, establishing liquid biomass as a new type of renewable energy. Her work to protect houseboat owners in Seattle led to a Senate-sponsored bill that passed into law in 2014. Tarleton's HB 1725 spurred efforts to strengthen the state's college savings fund for the middle class. Tarleton also authored HB 2238, which would have made Washington the first state in the nation to require employers to provide paid vacation in order to support a healthy workplace. Another of her bills, HB 2579, proposed a prohibition on the practice of "suction dredging" by hobby miners in public waters where salmon, steelhead, and bull trout spawn.

Tarleton now co-chairs the legislative task force on the economic resilience of maritime, fishing, and other manufacturing sectors that constitute about 40% of Washington's economy. She also represents the House of Representatives on the Pacific Northwest Economic Region (PNWER) Executive Committee, a US–Canadian public and private sector partnership to advance shared economic interests and develop strategies supporting cross-border trade and cultural relationships. Tarleton also was selected for the Legislators' Energy Horizons Institute (LEHI) certificate program in 2013 for legislators nationwide and in Canada who are committed to working on energy-related legislation during their careers as lawmakers. In 2014, Tarleton created and was selected by her colleagues to co-chair the Economic and Community Resilience legislative caucus. Additionally, members of the State Aviation legislative caucus selected her as co-chair.

== Personal life ==
Tarleton is married to Bob Tarleton. They live in Seattle's Ballard neighborhood.

Washington House of Representatives
Preceded by Mary Lou Dickerson	Member of the Washington House of Representatives from the 36th district 2013–2021	Succeeded by Liz Berry
