= Mary Lou Dickerson =

American politician (born 1946)

Member of the Washington House of Representatives from the 36th district
- In office January 9, 1995 – January 13, 2013
- Preceded by: Jeanne Kohl-Welles
- Succeeded by: Gael Tarleton

Personal details
- Born: September 3, 1946 (age 79) Salem, Oregon, U.S.
- Party: Democratic
- Spouse: John Birnel
- Education: University of Oregon (BS); University of Hawaii (MSW)

Mary Lou Dickerson (born September 3, 1946) is an American politician who served as a Democratic member of the Washington House of Representatives, representing the 36th district from 1995 until 2013.

== Early life and education ==
Dickerson was born in Salem, Oregon. She earned a Master of Social Work from the University of Hawaii and Bachelor of Science in journalism from the University of Oregon. She also completed post-graduate work in Business and Public Administration.

== Career ==
In addition to being an author, Dickerson worked as executive director for the Bellevue Schools Foundation and North Seattle Youth Services. She also worked as Program Development Director for the National CASA Association and as Program Manager for Echo Glen Treatment Center.

Dickerson was elected to the Washington House of Representatives in 1994, representing the 36th legislative district as a Democrat. She served nine terms in the House and served as the chair of the Health and Human Services Appropriations committee. She also sat on the Ways and Means committee and the Early Learning and Human Services committee.

== Personal life ==
Dickerson resides in Seattle with her husband, John Birnel. They have two children.
