= Washington's 5th congressional district =

U.S. House district for Washington

Coordinates: 48°N 118°W

- Interactive map of district boundaries since January 3, 2023. Points indicate major cities in the district (Spokane, Spokane Valley, Pullman, and Walla Walla respectively).
- Representative: Michael Baumgartner; R–Spokane
- Population (2025): 798,577
- Median household income: $78,303
- Ethnicity: 79.4% White; 8.4% Hispanic; 6.3% Two or more races; 2.3% Asian; 1.7% Black; 1.6% Native American; 1.1% other
- Cook PVI: R+5

Washington's 5th congressional district encompasses the Eastern Washington counties of Ferry, Stevens, Pend Oreille, Lincoln, Spokane, Whitman, Walla Walla, Columbia, Garfield, and Asotin, along with parts of Adams and Franklin. It is centered on Spokane, the state's second-largest city.

Since 2025, the 5th district has been represented in the U.S. House of Representatives by Michael Baumgartner, a Republican. The seat was held by former Democratic Speaker of the House Tom Foley between 1965 and 1995 before he lost reelection to George Nethercutt in 1994.

In presidential elections, the 5th district was once fairly competitive, but in recent years has generally been a safe bet for the Republicans. John McCain only narrowly won the district in 2008 with 52% of the vote. Mitt Romney won the district with 56% in 2012, while Donald Trump won this district all three times he ran, with 53% in both 2016 and 2020, and 54% in 2024.

The first election in the 5th district was in 1914, won by Democrat Clarence Dill. Following the 1910 census, Washington gained two seats in the U.S. House, from three to five, but did not reapportion for the 1912 election. The two new seats were elected as statewide at-large, with each voter casting ballots for three congressional seats, their district and two at-large. Afterwards, the state was reapportioned to five districts for the 1914 election. The state's 6th district was added after the 1930 census and first contested in the 1932 election.

== Recent election results from statewide races ==
Year	Office	Results
2008	President	McCain 52% - 46%
2010	Senate	Rossi 59% - 41%
2012	President	Romney 56% - 44%
2016	President	Trump 53% - 39%
2016	Senate	Vance 53% - 47%
2016	Governor	Bryant 56% - 44%
2016	Lt. Governor	McClendon 60% - 40%
2016	Secretary of State	Wyman 66% - 34%
2016	Auditor	Miloscia 58% - 42%
2018	Senate	Hutchison 53% - 47%
2020	President	Trump 53% - 43%
2020	Governor	Culp 58% - 42%
2020	Secretary of State	Wyman 63% - 37%
2020	Treasurer	Davidson 59% - 41%
2020	Auditor	Leyba 55% - 45%
2020	Attorney General	Larkin 56% - 43%
2022	Senate	Smiley 58% - 42%
2022	Secretary of State (Spec.)	Anderson 55% - 38%
2024	President	Trump 54% - 43%
2024	Senate	Garcia 54% - 45%
2024	Governor	Reichert 58% - 42%
2024	Lt. Governor	Matthews 59% - 40%
2024	Secretary of State	Whitaker 56% - 44%
2024	Treasurer	Hanek 57% - 43%
2024	Auditor	Hawkins 57% - 43%
2024	Attorney General	Serrano 59% - 41%
2024	Commissioner of Public Lands	Herrera Beutler 61% - 39%

== Composition ==
For the 118th and successive Congresses (based on redistricting following the 2020 census), the district contains all or portions of the following counties and communities:

Adams County (4)

Hatton, Lind, Ritzville, Washtucna

Asotin County (5)

All 4 communities

Columbia County (2)

Dayton, Starbuck

Ferry County (12)

All 12 communities

Franklin County (4)

Basin City, Connell, Kahlotus, Mesa

Garfield County (2)

Pataha, Pomeroy

Lincoln County (8)

All 8 communities

Pend Oreille County (5)

All 5 communities

Spokane County (20)

All 20 communities

Stevens County (11)

All 11 communities

Walla Walla County (10)

All 10 communities

Whitman County (17)

All 17 communities

== List of members representing the district ==
Member (Residence)	Party	Years	Cong ess	Electoral history	District location
District established March 4, 1915
Clarence Dill (Spokane)	Democratic	March 4, 1915 – March 3, 1919	64th 65th	Elected in 1914. Re-elected in 1916. Lost re-election.	
J. Stanley Webster (Spokane)	Republican	March 4, 1919 – May 8, 1923	66th 67th 68th	Elected in 1918. Re-elected in 1920. Re-elected in 1922. Resigned to become judge of the U.S. District Court for the Eastern District of Washington.	
Vacant		May 8, 1923 – September 25, 1923	68th		
Samuel B. Hill (Waterville)	Democratic	September 25, 1923 – June 25, 1936	68th 69th 70th 71st 72nd 73rd 74th	Elected to finish Webster's term. Re-elected in 1924. Re-elected in 1926. Re-elected in 1928. Re-elected in 1930. Re-elected in 1932. Re-elected in 1934. Resigned to become member of the U.S. Board of Tax Appeals.	
Vacant		June 25, 1936 – January 3, 1937	74th		
Charles H. Leavy (Spokane)	Democratic	January 3, 1937 – August 1, 1942	75th 76th 77th	Elected in 1936. Re-elected in 1938. Re-elected in 1940. Resigned to become judge of the U.S. District Court for the Western District of Washington.	
Vacant		August 1, 1942 – January 3, 1943	77th		
Walt Horan (Wenatchee)	Republican	January 3, 1943 – January 3, 1965	78th 79th 80th 81st 82nd 83rd 84th 85th 86th 87th 88th	Elected in 1942. Re-elected in 1944. Re-elected in 1946. Re-elected in 1948. Re-elected in 1950. Re-elected in 1952. Re-elected in 1954. Re-elected in 1956. Re-elected in 1958. Re-elected in 1960. Re-elected in 1962. Lost re-election.	
Tom Foley (Spokane)	Democratic	January 3, 1965 – January 3, 1995	89th 90th 91st 92nd 93rd 94th 95th 96th 97th 98th 99th 100th 101st 102nd 103rd	Elected in 1964. Re-elected in 1966. Re-elected in 1968. Re-elected in 1970. Re-elected in 1972. Re-elected in 1974. Re-elected in 1976. Re-elected in 1978. Re-elected in 1980. Re-elected in 1982. Re-elected in 1984. Re-elected in 1986. Re-elected in 1988. Re-elected in 1990. Re-elected in 1992. Lost re-election.	
George Nethercutt (Spokane)	Republican	January 3, 1995 – January 3, 2005	104th 105th 106th 107th 108th	Elected in 1994. Re-elected in 1996. Re-elected in 1998. Re-elected in 2000. Re-elected in 2002. Retired to run for U.S. senator.	
George Nethercutt (Spokane)	Republican	January 3, 1995 – January 3, 2005	104th 105th 106th 107th 108th	Elected in 1994. Re-elected in 1996. Re-elected in 1998. Re-elected in 2000. Re-elected in 2002. Retired to run for U.S. senator.	2003–2013
Cathy McMorris Rodgers (Spokane)	Republican	January 3, 2005 – January 3, 2025	109th 110th 111th 112th 113th 114th 115th 116th 117th 118th	Elected in 2004. Re-elected in 2006. Re-elected in 2008. Re-elected in 2010. Re-elected in 2012. Re-elected in 2014. Re-elected in 2016. Re-elected in 2018. Re-elected in 2020. Re-elected in 2022. Retired.	2003–2013
Cathy McMorris Rodgers (Spokane)	Republican	January 3, 2005 – January 3, 2025	109th 110th 111th 112th 113th 114th 115th 116th 117th 118th	Elected in 2004. Re-elected in 2006. Re-elected in 2008. Re-elected in 2010. Re-elected in 2012. Re-elected in 2014. Re-elected in 2016. Re-elected in 2018. Re-elected in 2020. Re-elected in 2022. Retired.	2013–2023
Cathy McMorris Rodgers (Spokane)	Republican	January 3, 2005 – January 3, 2025	109th 110th 111th 112th 113th 114th 115th 116th 117th 118th	Elected in 2004. Re-elected in 2006. Re-elected in 2008. Re-elected in 2010. Re-elected in 2012. Re-elected in 2014. Re-elected in 2016. Re-elected in 2018. Re-elected in 2020. Re-elected in 2022. Retired.	2023–present
Michael Baumgartner (Spokane)	Republican	January 3, 2025 – present	119th	Elected in 2024. Re-elected in 2026.	2023–present

== Recent election results ==
=== 2012 ===
Washington 5th Congressional District - 6 November 2012
Party	Candidate	Votes	%
Republican	Cathy McMorris Rodgers (Incumbent)	191,066	61.9
Democratic	Rich Cowan	117,512	38.1
Total votes		308,578	100.0

=== 2014 ===
Washington's 5th congressional district, 2014
Party	Candidate	Votes	%
Republican	Cathy McMorris Rodgers (incumbent)	135,470	60.7
Democratic	Joseph Pakootas	87,772	39.3
Total votes		223,242	100.0
Republican hold			

=== 2016 ===
Washington's 5th congressional district, 2016
Party	Candidate	Votes	%
Republican	Cathy McMorris Rodgers (incumbent)	192,959	59.6
Democratic	Joe Pakootas	130,575	40.4
Total votes		323,534	100.0
Republican hold			

=== 2018 ===
Washington's 5th congressional district, 2018
Party	Candidate	Votes	%
Republican	Cathy McMorris Rodgers (incumbent)	175,422	54.8
Democratic	Lisa Brown	144,925	45.2
Total votes		320,347	100.0
Republican hold			

=== 2020 ===
Washington's 5th congressional district, 2020
Party	Candidate	Votes	%
Republican	Cathy McMorris Rodgers (incumbent)	247,815	61.3
Democratic	Dave Wilson	155,737	38.5
Write-in		808	0.2
Total votes		404,360	100
Republican hold			

=== 2022 ===
Washington's 5th congressional district, 2022
Party	Candidate	Votes	%
Republican	Cathy McMorris Rodgers (incumbent)	188,648	59.5
Democratic	Natasha Hill	127,585	40.3
Write-in		773	0.2
Total votes		317,006	100
Republican hold			

=== 2024 ===
Washington's 5th congressional district, 2024
Party	Candidate	Votes	%
Republican	Michael Baumgartner	240,619	60.6
Democratic	Carmela Conroy	156,074	39.3
Write-in		753	0.1
Total votes		422,622	100
Republican hold			

== Historical district boundaries ==
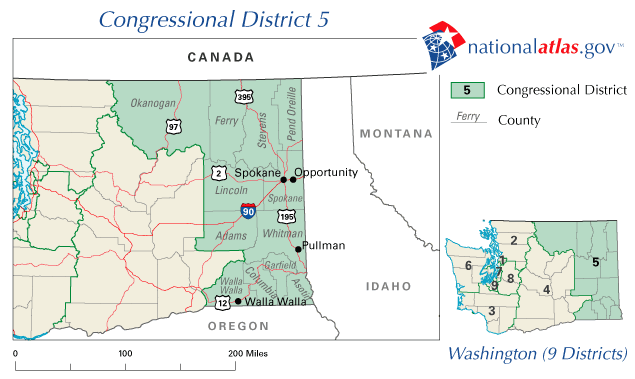
The district from 2003 to 2013

The district from 2013 to 2023

== See also ==
- United States House of Representatives elections in Washington, 2010
- United States House of Representatives elections in Washington, 2012
- United States House of Representatives elections in Washington, 2014
- United States House of Representatives elections in Washington, 2016
- United States House of Representatives elections in Washington, 2018
- United States House of Representatives elections in Washington, 2020
- United States House of Representatives elections in Washington, 2022
- United States House of Representatives elections in Washington, 2024

U.S. House of Representatives
Preceded by Texas's 12th congressional district	Home district of the speaker June 6, 1989 – January 3, 1995	Succeeded by Georgia's 6th congressional district
