= Washington's 4th congressional district =

U.S. House district for Washington

Coordinates: 47°00′00″N 120°00′00″W

- Interactive map of district boundaries since January 3, 2023. Points indicate major cities in the district: (1) Yakima, (2-4) the Tri-Cities (Kennewick, Pasco, Richland), and (5) Moses Lake.
- Representative: Dan Newhouse; R–Sunnyside
- Population (2025): 809,530
- Median household income: $80,297
- Ethnicity: 51.1% White; 39.8% Hispanic; 3.8% Two or more races; 2.2% Native American; 1.7% Asian; 0.8% Black; 0.6% other
- Cook PVI: R+10

Washington's 4th congressional district encompasses a large area of central Washington, covering the counties of Douglas, Okanogan, Grant, Yakima, Benton, and Klickitat; and parts of Adams and Franklin counties. The district is dominated by the Yakima and Tri-Cities areas. With a Cook Partisan Voting Index rating of R+10, it is the most Republican district in Washington.

Its Republican dominance is long-established. Apart from Klickitat County, which was won six times by Democrats between 1968 and 2008 — though never with more than 51 percent of the ballots — no Democratic presidential candidate has carried any county in the district since Bill Clinton in 1992 carried Okanogan County. None of the other counties in the district have backed a Democrat for President since Lyndon B. Johnson in 1964, while Adams County has not voted Democratic since Franklin D. Roosevelt in 1936.

John McCain won the district in 2008 with 58% of the vote. Mitt Romney won the district with 60% in 2012, while Donald Trump won this district all three times he ran, with 57% in both 2016 and 2020, and 59% in 2024. This district was the most Republican congressional district in the state in all five of those presidential elections.

Only three Democrats have ever represented the district in Congress. The last Democrat to represent the district was Jay Inslee, who held the seat during the 103rd Congress. Doc Hastings, Inslee's Republican opponent in 1992, defeated Inslee in a 1994 rematch and served in Congress until he retired in 2014. After losing to Hastings in 1994, Inslee later moved to Bainbridge Island and was sent back to Congress representing the first district in the central Puget Sound area. Inslee was elected the state's governor in 2012, and took office in January 2013. In the 2008 election, Hastings easily defeated challenger George Fearing. The 4th district has been represented in the U.S. House of Representatives by Dan Newhouse since 2015, a Republican from Sunnyside.

== Recent election results from statewide races ==
Year	Office	Results
2008	President	McCain 58% - 40%
2010	Senate	Rossi 65% - 35%
2012	President	Romney 60% - 40%
2016	President	Trump 57% - 36%
2016	Senate	Vance 55% - 45%
2016	Governor	Bryant 60% - 40%
2016	Lt. Governor	McClendon 64% - 36%
2016	Secretary of State	Wyman 69% - 31%
2016	Auditor	Miloscia 61% - 39%
2018	Senate	Hutchison 61% - 39%
2020	President	Trump 57% - 40%
2020	Governor	Culp 62% - 38%
2020	Secretary of State	Wyman 67% - 33%
2020	Treasurer	Davidson 63% - 37%
2020	Auditor	Leyba 59% - 41%
2020	Attorney General	Larkin 60% - 40%
2022	Senate	Smiley 66% - 34%
2022	Secretary of State (Spec.)	Anderson 59% - 32%
2024	President	Trump 59% - 38%
2024	Senate	Garcia 58% - 41%
2024	Governor	Reichert 63% - 37%
2024	Lt. Governor	Matthews 64% - 36%
2024	Secretary of State	Whitaker 60% - 40%
2024	Treasurer	Hanek 61% - 39%
2024	Auditor	Hawkins 61% - 39%
2024	Attorney General	Serrano 64% - 36%
2024	Commissioner of Public Lands	Herrera Beutler 66% - 34%

== Composition ==
For the 118th and successive Congresses (based on redistricting following the 2020 census), the district contains all or portions of the following counties and communities:

Adams County (1)

Othello

Benton County (6)

All 6 communities

Douglas County (6)

All 6 communities

Franklin County (2)

Pasco, West Pasco

Grant County (25)

All 25 communities

Klickitat County (13)

All 13 communities

Okanogan County (19)

All 19 communities

Yakima County (28)

All 28 communities

== List of members representing the district ==
Member (District Home)	Party	Years	Cong ress	Electoral history	District location
District established March 4, 1915
William La Follette (Pullman)	Republican	March 4, 1915 – March 3, 1919	64th 65th	Redistricted from the 3rd district and re-elected in 1914. Re-elected in 1916. Lost renomination.	
John W. Summers (Walla Walla)	Republican	March 4, 1919 – March 3, 1933	66th 67th 68th 69th 70th 71st 72nd	Elected in 1918. Re-elected in 1920. Re-elected in 1922. Re-elected in 1924. Re-elected in 1926. Re-elected in 1928. Re-elected in 1930. Lost re-election.	
Knute Hill (Prosser)	Democratic	March 4, 1933 – January 3, 1943	73rd 74th 75th 76th 77th	Elected in 1932. Re-elected in 1934. Re-elected in 1936. Re-elected in 1938. Re-elected in 1940. Lost re-election.	
Hal Holmes (Ellensburg)	Republican	January 3, 1943 – January 3, 1959	78th 79th 80th 81st 82nd 83rd 84th 85th	Elected in 1942. Re-elected in 1944. Re-elected in 1946. Re-elected in 1948. Re-elected in 1950. Re-elected in 1952. Re-elected in 1954. Re-elected in 1956. Retired.	
Catherine Dean May (Yakima)	Republican	January 3, 1959 – January 3, 1971	86th 87th 88th 89th 90th 91st	Elected in 1958. Re-elected in 1960. Re-elected in 1962. Re-elected in 1964. Re-elected in 1966. Re-elected in 1968. Lost re-election.	
Mike McCormack (Richland)	Democratic	January 3, 1971 – January 3, 1981	92nd 93rd 94th 95th 96th	Elected in 1970. Re-elected in 1972. Re-elected in 1974. Re-elected in 1976. Re-elected in 1978. Lost re-election.	
Sid Morrison (Zillah)	Republican	January 3, 1981 – January 3, 1993	97th 98th 99th 100th 101st 102nd	Elected in 1980. Re-elected in 1982. Re-elected in 1984. Re-elected in 1986. Re-elected in 1988. Re-elected in 1990. Retired to run for governor.	
Jay Inslee (Selah)	Democratic	January 3, 1993 – January 3, 1995	103rd	Elected in 1992. Lost re-election.	
Doc Hastings (Pasco)	Republican	January 3, 1995 – January 3, 2015	104th 105th 106th 107th 108th 109th 110th 111th 112th 113th	Elected in 1994. Re-elected in 1996. Re-elected in 1998. Re-elected in 2000. Re-elected in 2002. Re-elected in 2004. Re-elected in 2006. Re-elected in 2008. Re-elected in 2010. Re-elected in 2012. Retired.	
Doc Hastings (Pasco)	Republican	January 3, 1995 – January 3, 2015	104th 105th 106th 107th 108th 109th 110th 111th 112th 113th	Elected in 1994. Re-elected in 1996. Re-elected in 1998. Re-elected in 2000. Re-elected in 2002. Re-elected in 2004. Re-elected in 2006. Re-elected in 2008. Re-elected in 2010. Re-elected in 2012. Retired.	2003–2013
Doc Hastings (Pasco)	Republican	January 3, 1995 – January 3, 2015	104th 105th 106th 107th 108th 109th 110th 111th 112th 113th	Elected in 1994. Re-elected in 1996. Re-elected in 1998. Re-elected in 2000. Re-elected in 2002. Re-elected in 2004. Re-elected in 2006. Re-elected in 2008. Re-elected in 2010. Re-elected in 2012. Retired.	2013–2023
Dan Newhouse (Sunnyside)	Republican	January 3, 2015 – present	114th 115th 116th 117th 118th 119th	Elected in 2014. Re-elected in 2016. Re-elected in 2018. Re-elected in 2020. Re-elected in 2022. Re-elected in 2024. Retired.	2013–2023
Dan Newhouse (Sunnyside)	Republican	January 3, 2015 – present	114th 115th 116th 117th 118th 119th	Elected in 2014. Re-elected in 2016. Re-elected in 2018. Re-elected in 2020. Re-elected in 2022. Re-elected in 2024. Retired.	2023–present
Amanda McKinney (Yakima)	Republican	Assuming office on January 3, 2027		Elected in 2026.	2023–present

== Recent election results ==
=== 2012 ===
Washington's 4th Congressional District, 2012
Party	Candidate	Votes	%
Republican	Doc Hastings (Incumbent)	154,749	66.2
Democratic	Mary Baechler	78,940	33.8
Total votes		233,689	100.0

=== 2014 ===
Washington's 4th congressional district, 2014
Party	Candidate	Votes	%
Republican	Dan Newhouse	77,772	50.8
Republican	Clint Didier	75,307	49.2
Total votes		153,079	100.0
Republican hold			

=== 2016 ===
Washington's 4th congressional district, 2016
Party	Candidate	Votes	%
Republican	Dan Newhouse (incumbent)	132,517	57.6
Republican	Clint Didier	97,402	42.4
Total votes		229,919	100.0
Republican hold			

=== 2018 ===
Washington's 4th congressional district, 2018
Party	Candidate	Votes	%
Republican	Dan Newhouse (incumbent)	141,551	62.8
Democratic	Christine Brown	83,785	37.2
Total votes		225,336	100.0
Republican hold			

=== 2020 ===
Washington's 4th congressional district, 2020
Party	Candidate	Votes	%
Republican	Dan Newhouse (incumbent)	202,108	66.2
Democratic	Douglas McKinley	102,667	33.6
Write-in		488	0.2
Total votes		305,263	100.0
Republican hold			

=== 2022 ===
Washington's 4th congressional district, 2022
Party	Candidate	Votes	%
Republican	Dan Newhouse (incumbent)	150,619	66.5
Democratic	Doug White	70,710	31.2
Write-in		5,318	2.3
Total votes		226,647	100.0
Republican hold			

=== 2024 ===
Washington's 4th congressional district, 2024
Party	Candidate	Votes	%
Republican	Dan Newhouse (incumbent)	153,477	52.0
Republican	Jerrod Sessler	136,175	46.2
Write-in		5,400	1.8
Total votes		295,052	100.0
Republican hold			

== Historical district boundaries ==
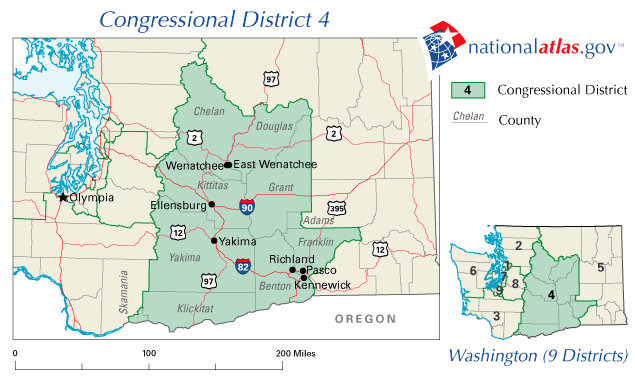
The district from 2003 to 2013

The district from 2013 to 2023

== See also ==
- United States House of Representatives elections in Washington, 2008
- United States House of Representatives elections in Washington, 2010
- United States House of Representatives elections in Washington, 2012
- United States House of Representatives elections in Washington, 2014
