= Jim Kastama =

American politician

Member of the Puyallup City Council, District 1
- Incumbent
- Assumed office January 1, 2018
- Preceded by: John Hopkins

Member of the Washington Senate from the 25th district
- In office January 8, 2001 – January 14, 2013
- Preceded by: Calvin Goings
- Succeeded by: Bruce Dammeier

Member of the Washington House of Representatives from the 25th district
- In office January 13, 1997 – January 8, 2001
- Preceded by: Grant Owen Pelesky
- Succeeded by: Dave Morrell

Personal details
- Born: James Matthew Kastama; October 5, 1959 (age 66) Bellingham, Washington, U.S.
- Party: Democratic
- Spouse: Barbara
- Children: 5
- Education: University of California at Berkeley (BA)

James Matthew Kastama (born October 5, 1959) was a Senator in the Washington State Senate. A Democrat, Kastama represented the 25th legislative district. He chaired the Senate Economic Development, Trade and Innovation Committee, and participated on the Higher Education & Workforce Development and Transportation Committees. Represented the 25th Legislative District since 1996 until 2012 Kastama was first elected to the Senate in 2000 after two terms in the House of Representatives.

Upon graduation from Puyallup High School in 1978, he matriculated to Claremont Men's College and holds a Bachelor of Arts from the University of California at Berkeley.

Currently, Kastama is a part-time faculty member at the community college and university level where he teaches classes in Organizational Assessment, Strategic Planning, and Managing in a Political and Legislative Environment. He is also an examiner for the Washington State Quality Awards.

Kastama is best known in state politics for utilizing a rarely used procedural motion called "the 9th Order" to join two Democrats in temporally shifting Senate control to the Republicans to pass a budget by a margin of one vote. The maneuver earned Kastama tremendous animus from within his own party. His refusal to shift control back to the Democrats forced negotiations that eventually resulted in a bipartisan budget with 44-2 votes.

In the 2012 election cycle Kastama was a Democratic candidate for Washington Secretary of State but was defeated in the state's August 2012 primary.
