= Kathleen Drew (politician) =

American politician

Member of the Washington Senate from the 5th district
- In office January 11, 1993 – January 13, 1997
- Preceded by: Gerald L. “Jerry” Saling
- Succeeded by: Dino Rossi

Personal details
- Born: 1951 or 1952 (age 73–74)
- Party: Democratic
- Education: Ohio State University (BA); Evergreen State College (BA)

Kathleen K. Drew (born 1960) is an American politician who served as a member of the Washington State Senate, representing the 5th district from 1993 to 1997. A member of the Democratic Party, she was defeated by Republican Dino Rossi in her 1996 reelection bid and later ran for Washington Secretary of State in 2012 and was defeated by moderate Republican Kim Wyman.
