= Kim Wyman =

15th Secretary of State of Washington

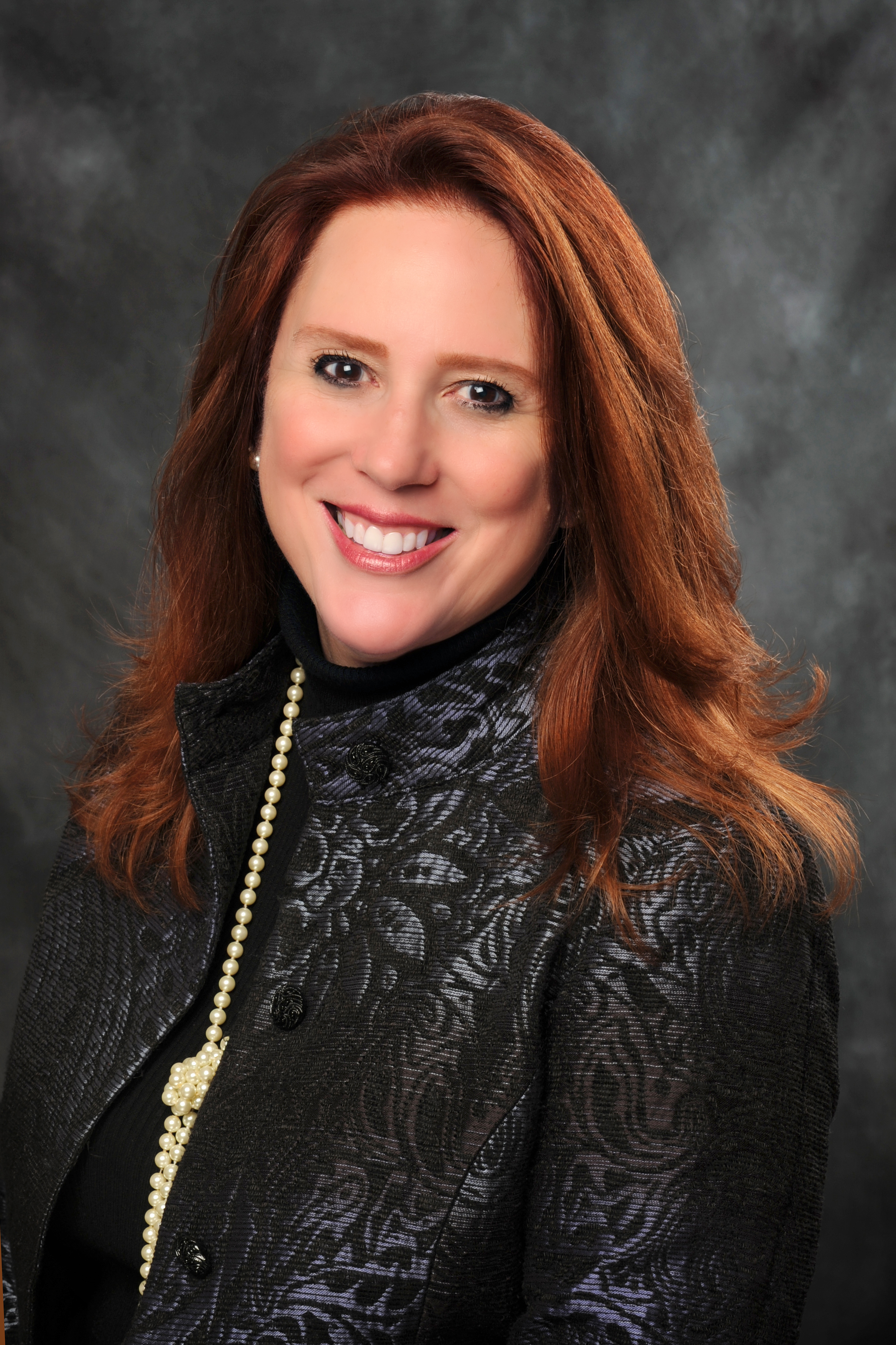
- Official portrait, 2015

15th Secretary of State of Washington
- In office January 16, 2013 – November 19, 2021
- Governor: Jay Inslee
- Preceded by: Sam Reed
- Succeeded by: Steve Hobbs

Personal details
- Born: Kimberley Marie Wyman; July 15, 1962 (age 63) Southern California, U.S.
- Party: Republican
- Spouse: John Wyman (m. 1988)
- Children: 2
- Education: California State University, Long Beach (BA); Troy University (MPA)

Kimberley Marie Wyman (born July 15, 1962) is an American politician who served as the 15th Secretary of State of Washington from 2013 to 2021.

Wyman was first elected Secretary of State in 2012. She was re-elected in 2016 and 2020. In 2021, she resigned to work on election security at the Cybersecurity and Infrastructure Security Agency in the Biden administration.

As of 2026, Wyman is the last Republican to have held statewide office in the State of Washington, or in any of the three contiguous West Coast states.

== Early life and education ==
Wyman attended college at California State University, Long Beach and lived abroad after graduation. Barriers to voting in US elections while living in Germany inspired her to become an elections official. She earned her Master of Public Administration degree from Troy University's European Division. Wyman was one of the first public officials to become a Certified Elections/Registration Administrator from Auburn University.

== Political career ==
In 2001, Wyman was appointed as Thurston County Auditor, succeeding Sam Reed. She was elected to the position in 2002 and reelected in 2006 and 2010.

In the 2012 Washington state elections, Wyman was elected Secretary of State, succeeding Sam Reed, narrowly defeating her Democratic opponent, former state Representative Kathleen Drew. Wyman was the only Republican elected to statewide office in the state. She was endorsed in the election by the Walla Walla Union-Bulletin, The Wenatchee World, the Tri-City Herald, and The Seattle Times. The Times cited her bipartisan appeal and experience as an elections administrator in its endorsement. She was also endorsed by the Washington Education Association, which normally endorses Democrats.

In the 2016 elections, Wyman was reelected, defeating former Seattle City Councilwoman Tina Podlodowski with 55% of the vote.

Wyman was re-elected to a third term in the 2020 election, defeating Democratic State Representative Gael Tarleton with 54% of the vote. On October 27, 2021, Wyman announced that she would resign as Secretary of State to join the Cybersecurity and Infrastructure Security Agency in the Biden administration to work on election security. Her resignation took effect on November 19.

== Personal life ==
Wyman lives in Lacey, Washington, with her husband John and their two children. She has run in several marathons.

In March 2017, Wyman was diagnosed with an early form of colon cancer.

== Electoral history ==
Washington Secretary of State Primary Election, 2012
Party	Candidate	Votes	%
Republican	Kim Wyman	528,754	39.75%
Democratic	Kathleen Drew	289,052	21.73%
Democratic	Greg Nickels	210,832	15.85%
Democratic	Jim Kastama	185,425	13.94%
Constitution	Karen Murray	50,888	3.83%
Independent	David Anderson	44,276	3.33%
Human Rights	Sam Wright	20,809	1.56%

Secretary of State of Washington
Year	Republican	Votes	Pct	Democratic	Votes	Pct
2012	Kim Wyman	1,464,741	50.38%	Kathleen Drew	1,442,868	49.62%
2016	Kim Wyman	1,713,004	54.74%	Tina Podlodowski	1,416,299	45.26%
2020	Kim Wyman	2,116,141	53.61%	Gael Tarleton	1,826,710	46.27%

Political offices
Preceded by Sam Reed	Secretary of State of Washington; 2013–2021	Succeeded by Steve Hobbs
