= 2013 Washington's 26th state senate district special election =

2013 election in Washington state

2013 Washington State Senate 26th District special election
- November 5, 2013

Washington's 26th state senate district
Candidate	Jan Angel	Nathan Schlicher
Party	Republican	Democratic
Popular vote	11,162	10,183
Percentage	51.9%	47.3%
Senator before election
Nathan Schlicher
Democratic
Senator
Jan Angel
Republican

A special election was held on November 5, 2013, to elect a senator to fill the rest of Derek Kilmer's term in the Washington State Senate representing the 26th district.

== Background ==
The seat was left vacant after incumbent Derek Kilmer was elected to the U.S. House in November 2012. Nathan Schlicher was appointed to the seat two weeks after Derek Kilmer was sworn in.

== Candidates ==
The election was contested between Nathan Schlicher of the Democratic Party and Jan Angel of the Republican Party, who advanced as the top two finishers in the August primary.

== Results ==
=== Primary election results ===
Primary election August 1, 2013
Party	Candidate	Votes	%
Republican	Jan Angel	8,109	56.8
Democratic	Nathan Schlicher	6,125	42.9
Total votes		14,281	100

=== General election results ===
General election November 5, 2013
Party	Candidate	Votes	%
Republican	Jan Angel	11,162	51.9
Democratic	Nathan Schlicher	10,183	47.3
Total votes		21,517	100
Republican gain from Democratic			

== Aftermath ==
Jan Angel won the election by about five percent, giving the Republican caucus a 24–25 minority for the 2014 session over previously having a 23-26 minority during the 2013 session.
