= A. A. Adams =

American politician from Washington

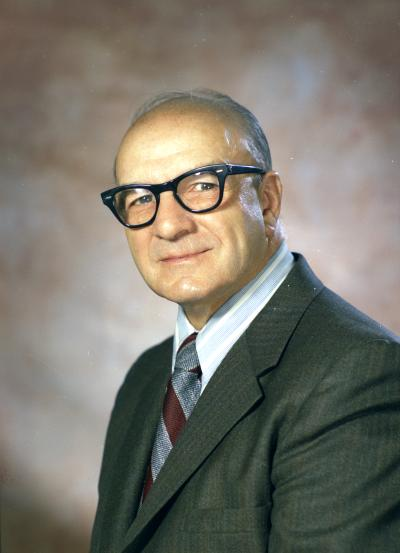
- A. A. Adams in 1971

Member of the Washington House of Representatives from the 26th district
- In office 1969–1973 Serving with Thomas A. Swayze Jr.
- Preceded by: Homer Humiston
- Succeeded by: Clifford W. Beck

Member of the Washington House of Representatives from the 27th district
- In office 1973–1981 Serving with R. Lorraine Wojahn and James E. Salatino
- Preceded by: Frank Marzano
- Succeeded by: Art Wang

Personal details
- Born: August 22, 1900 Bellingham, Washington, U.S.
- Died: May 31, 1985 (aged 84) Pacific, Washington, U.S.
- Party: Democratic
- Occupation: Politician

Abner Allen "Doc" Adams (August 22, 1900 – May 31, 1985) was an American politician in the state of Washington. He served in the Washington House of Representatives from 1969 to 1981. A Democrat, Adams was noted as a supporter of progressive policies, including assisted suicide, marijuana legalization, and abortion. In addition to his career as a state Representative, Adams was an accomplished chiropractor who served as president of the American Chiropractic Association.

== Personal life ==
Adams was born in Bellingham, Washington, on August 22, 1900. He studied at the Palmer College of Chiropractic in Davenport, Iowa, graduating in 1924.

Adams was married to Mildred S. Adams (1899–1993), a music and art teacher, on August 22, 1923. They had one child together. He was a Shriner. Adams supported the legalization of greyhound racing. Late in his political career, Adams was arrested for driving while intoxicated. Adams died on May 31, 1985. His wife, Mildred, died on March 21, 1993.

== Career ==
=== Chiropractor ===
In 1945, Adams moved to Tacoma, Washington, and opened an office there. Active in the wider chiropractor community, Adams was legislative chairman and later president of the Washington Chiropractors Association. He was elected president of the American Chiropractic Association in 1965 and served one term. Adams was also vice president of the International Chiropractors Association for some time. He retired from private practice in 1973.

=== Politics ===
Adams began his political career in 1960 as a member of the Tacoma Utility Board. A Democrat, he was first elected to the Washington House of Representatives in 1968, defeating the Republican nominee by a 52–48 margin, with a campaign heavily focusing on pension issues. One of his first actions in the House was to cosponsor a bill banning the carry of "dangerous weapons" at protests. While initially contested due to unclear language, the bill was passed unanimously when the Seattle Black Panthers announced their intention to protest it. He supported the 1970 legislation which legalized abortion in Washington.

Adams ran for reelection in 1970. While he won the primary, he had a lower vote total than his Republican opponents. He won the general election, again by a 52–48 margin. He was a cosponsor of the law which introduced mandatory vehicle insurance in Washington. In 1972, the redistricting process placed him in the 27th district, where he defeated Dennis Flannigan in a close primary. He went on to win reelection to a third term by a 67–33 margin and was made chair of the House Social and Health Services Committee. At 72 years old, Adams was the oldest representative in Washington.

In 1974, he sponsored the Senior Services Act, which created a Meals on Wheels program. He also led a probe into escapes at Western State Hospital, which quickly expanded to cover security at all state institutions and a variety of other issues. Adams beat his opponent in the primary and won the general election 66–34. He opposed the 1976 effort to remove Leonard A. Sawyer from his position of Speaker of the House. That same year, he won election for his fifth term 62–38.

Adams sponsored a "Death with Dignity" bill in 1977 that would have legalized a form of assisted suicide in Washington. He also supported a bill to decriminalize marijuana and a bill to legalize the prescription of Laetrile. He supported decriminalization of marijuana again the following year, saying that "We need to send Washington, D.C., a message." He won re-election 65–35.

In 1979, Adams continued to push for assisted suicide and marijuana legislation, successfully passing both bills through the House. He also cosponsored a bill creating a state lottery, although this did not ultimately pass. In May, Adams received criticism for taking a two-week vacation to Hawaii because his absence gave the Republicans a one-vote majority in the House, with an editorial in The News Tribune describing him as being "out of bounds." The following year, Adams opted to not run for reelection, citing a need to spend time with his family. He was succeeded by fellow Democrat Art Wang, who defeated his Republican opponent 71–29.

==== Electoral history ====
26th House District Position 1 Election, 1968
Primary election
Party	Candidate	Votes	%
Republican	Homer Humiston	8,929	52.58
Democratic	A.A. Adams	5,068	29.84
Democratic	Don Smith	2,985	17.58
Total votes		16,982	100.00
General election
Democratic	A.A. Adams	15,053	51.96
Republican	Homer Humiston	13,918	48.04
Total votes		28,971	100.0
