= Senator Faulk =

Senator Faulk may refer to:

- Larry Faulk (born 1936), Washington State Senate
- Mike Faulk (1953–2014), Tennessee State Senate

== See also ==
- Alexander A. Falk (1900–1975), New York State Senate
