= Michelle Caldier =

American dentist, professor, and politician

Michelle Caldier Valdez
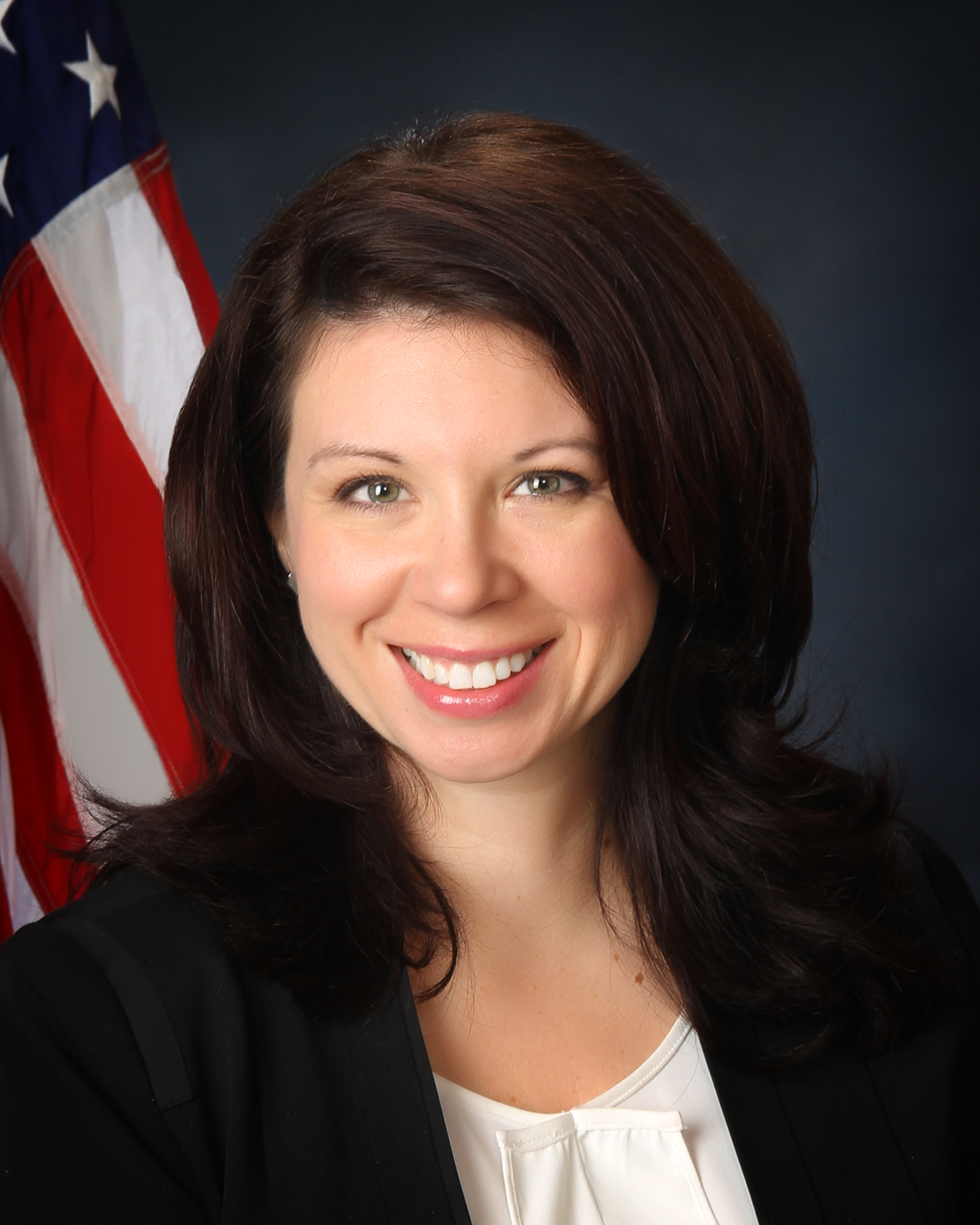

Member of the Washington House of Representatives from the 26th district
- Incumbent
- Assumed office January 12, 2015 Serving with Adison Richards
- Preceded by: Larry Seaquist

Personal details
- Born: 1976 (age 49–50) Bremerton, Washington, U.S.
- Party: Republican
- Spouse: Carlos Valdez
- Children: 1, and 2 stepchildren
- Education: Olympic College (AA); University of Washington School of Dentistry (BS, DDS)
- Occupation: State Representative
- Profession: Dentist, professor, politician
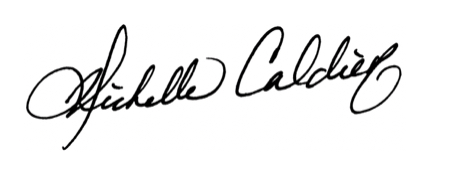
- Signature
- Website: Legislative website

Michelle L. Downey Caldier Valdez (born 1976) is an American dentist, professor, and politician serving as a member of the Washington House of Representatives, representing the 26th district since 2015. A member of the Republican Party, Caldier Valdez was elected to the Washington House of Representatives in 2014, defeating incumbent Democrat Larry Seaquist. Her district includes the cities of Bremerton, Gig Harbor and Port Orchard.

== Early life, education, and early career ==
Caldier was born in Bremerton, Washington, and raised in Kitsap County. Caldier graduated from Central Kitsap High School. Caldier earned her Associate of Sciences at Olympic College, and went on to earn her Bachelor of Science from the University of Washington, followed by her Doctorate in Dental Surgery from the University of Washington School of Dentistry.

Caldier has owned a dentistry practice for more than a decade that serves nursing homes around Puget Sound. She was also an Affiliate Professor at the University of Washington School of Dentistry.

In 2012, Caldier joined others to lobby the Legislature to restore funding to adult dental care for those on Medicaid, and was successful. This inspired her to run for the Legislature and continue fighting for those who cannot care for themselves. Caldier has donated thousands of hours to caring for the underserved, and chaired the Access to Care Committee for several years.

== Legislative career ==
In 2014, Caldier challenged incumbent Democratic State Representative Larry Seaquist for Washington's 26th house district, seat 2. She defeated him 50.61% – 49.37%, a difference of 601 votes. Caldier became the first Republican elected to the seat since then Rep. Lois McMahan was defeated by Derek Kilmer in 2004. Her election provided the Washington Republicans one of four pickups in the House in the 2014 election.

The first bill sponsored by Caldier to become law was House Bill 1855, a measure that requires local school districts to waive local requirements for foster children, homeless children, and at-risk youth who have attended three or more high schools and have met all state requirements for graduation. This is similar to current exceptions allowed for military dependent of active service members. The Washington State House of Representatives unanimously passed the bill on March 2, 2015.

She served on the following committees during the 2024 session: Healthcare & Wellness; Innovation, Community & Economic Development, & Veterans; and Regulated Substances & Gaming.

=== Temporary Departure from the House Republican Caucus ===
On November 17, 2022, Rep. Michelle Caldier left the House Republican Caucus during its reorganization meeting in Spokane. At the time, she did not immediately explain the reason for her departure. It was later revealed that Caldier's exit stemmed from allegations that the House Republican leadership had failed to provide reasonable accommodations for her disability. She returned to the Caucus on April 23, 2023, the same day Minority Leader J.T. Wilcox announced he would step down. Caldier publicly stated that Wilcox's resignation and the subsequent election of new leadership, particularly Rep. Stokesbary and Rep. Steele, influenced her decision to return.

During a December 2022 independent investigation into Caldier’s treatment of staff, Caldier alleged that the state had discriminated against her by not providing adequate accommodations for her disability. However, the investigator found her claims unsubstantiated, stating that the allegations appeared to be an attempt to deflect attention from her own conduct, which was the focus of the investigation. The report also noted that Caldier had provided false information in some interviews regarding her accommodation requests.

=== Independent Investigations ===
Caldier has been the subject of multiple investigations regarding her treatment of staff. The first independent investigation was initiated following an incident at Spokane Airport, which occurred immediately after the House Republican Caucus reorganization meeting, during which Caldier exited the Caucus. In that incident, Caldier allegedly told a Republican staff member they were "a horrible person." Following interviews with over a dozen people, the investigator concluded that Caldier demonstrated "a pattern of behavior in which she lashes out at people, makes public statements that have the impact of demeaning and embarrassing individuals, and is generally disrespectful." Caldier appealed the report; the House Executive Rules Committee denied her appeal. A second investigation was launched shortly after the release of the first report. Caldier was accused of violating a workplace policy on retaliation after she identified some of the staff members involved in Spokane Airport incident to the press. The second report concluded:

Caldier’s actions were retaliatory and bullying; she lashed out at the witnesses not only by disclosing their names, but by portraying them as political operatives. In doing so, she may have damaged their careers. This was a failure of respect, dignity, and civility, in violation of the Legislative Code of Conduct…Caldier did not make much, if any, effort to walk back the disclosures; rather, she proclaimed that to be pointless because she was going to be investigated anyway. The purpose of a walk-back would be to protect the witnesses, not Caldier, from reputational damage. Caldier’s failure to acknowledge that demonstrated a lack of remorse.

Caldier denied any intention to retaliate and said “there [was] no point” in more appeals.

== Personal life ==
Caldier resides in Gig Harbor, Washington. She has been an advocate for foster children, having been a foster child herself. She is the mother and foster mother of three daughters.

In December 2016, Caldier lost sight in her left eye due to acute glaucoma. She has limited vision in her right eye.
