= Jan Angel =

American politician from Washington

Member of the Washington Senate from the 26th district
- In office December 17, 2013 – January 14, 2019
- Preceded by: Nathan Schlicher
- Succeeded by: Emily Randall

Member of the Washington House of Representatives from the 26th district
- In office January 12, 2009 – December 17, 2013
- Preceded by: Patricia Lantz
- Succeeded by: Jesse Young

Kitsap County Commissioner
- In office January 1, 2005 – January 1, 2009
- Preceded by: D. W. "Dusty" Wiley
- Succeeded by: Charlotte Garrido

Personal details
- Born: 1946 (age 79–80) Cañon City, Colorado, U.S.
- Party: Republican
- Website: Official

Janice E. Angel (born 1946) is an American politician who served as a member of the Washington State Senate, representing the 26th district from 2013 to 2019. A member of the Republican Party, she previously served as a member of the Washington House of Representatives from 2009 to 2013. She won a November 5, 2013 special election for the 26th district Washington Senate seat, which incumbent Democrat Nathan Schlicher conceded on November 7. After the election was certified on December 4, Angel was sworn in as state senator on December 17.

== Background ==
On November 12, 2012, Angel announced that she would be running for the 26th District State Senate seat left open by Derek Kilmer, who had just won his election as U.S. Representative for the 6th congressional district. Democrat Nathan Schlicher was appointed to fill Kilmer's vacated State Senate seat on January 17, 2013, the election between Angel and Schlicher took place on November 5 that year, and he conceded the race on November 7.

Angel was born and grew up in Colorado and moved to Washington in 1983 where she has worked in realty, finance, and banking. She was first elected to public office as a Kitsap County commissioner in 2000 and served in that capacity until 2009, when she was sworn in as a State Representative for the 26th District. Angel was re-elected as State Representative in 2012.

As State Representative, Angel served as the ranking minority member of the Community Development Housing & Tribal Affairs Committee and on the Health Care & Wellness and Transportation Committees.

Senator Angel currently serves as co-chair of the Financial Institutions Housing & Insurance Committee and as Vice Chair of the Trade & Economic Development Committee. She also serves on the Health Care and Transportation Committees.

For her support of small business during the 2011-2012 session, Jan received the NFIB's Guardian of Small Business Award.

Angel announced in 2018 that she would not seek reelection and endorsed Marty McClendon, former Republican candidate for lieutenant governor. McClendon went on to lose to Democrat Emily Randall by 104 votes.

Angel lives in Port Orchard with her husband Lynn Williams. She has two daughters, one stepdaughter, one stepson, nine grandchildren, and three great-grandchildren.

== Awards ==
- 2014 Guardians of Small Business award. Presented by NFIB.
