= Ron Hanna =

American politician

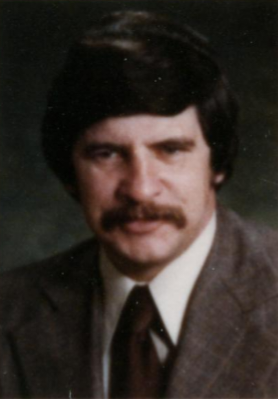
- Hanna in 1977

Member of the Washington House of Representatives from the 26th district
- In office 1975–???

Personal details
- Born: September 25, 1937 (age 89) Tacoma, Washington, U.S.
- Party: Democratic
- Spouse: Linda Hanna
- Children: 3
- Education: Pacific Lutheran University; University of Washington

Ron Hanna (born September 25, 1937) is an American politician. He served as a Democratic member for the 26th district of the Washington House of Representatives.

== Life and career ==
Hanna was born in Tacoma, Washington. He attended Pacific Lutheran University and the University of Washington.

In 1975, Hanna was elected to represent the 26th district of the Washington House of Representatives.
