= Tom Huff =

Tom Huff may refer to:

- Tom E. Huff (1938–1990), American author
- Tom Huff (politician) (1933–2013), American businessman and politician
