= Linda Thomas =

Linda Thomas may refer to:

- Lynda Thomas (born 1981), Mexican musician, singer and songwriter
- Linda Craig Thomas, American politician and former member of the Washington House of Representatives
- Linda Lee Thomas (1883–1954), American socialite and wife of Cole Porter
