= Dammeier =

Dammeier is a surname. Notable people with the surname include:

- Bruce Dammeier (born 1961), American politician
- Detlev Dammeier (born 1968), German footballer and manager
