= Wes Pruitt =

American politician

Member of the Washington House of Representatives from the 26th district
- In office January 12, 1987 – January 9, 1995
- Preceded by: Bill Smitherman
- Succeeded by: Tom Huff

Personal details
- Born: January 25, 1947 (age 79) Springfield, Vermont, U.S.
- Party: Democratic
- Occupation: attorney, social worker, educational consultant

Wesley Pruitt (born January 25, 1947) is an American politician, attorney, and social worker in the state of Washington. He served in the Washington House of Representatives from 1987 to 1995 as a Democrat. Pruitt was born in Springfield, Vermont and graduated in sociology at the University of Washington.
