= 2016 Pierce County Executive election =

- November 8, 2016
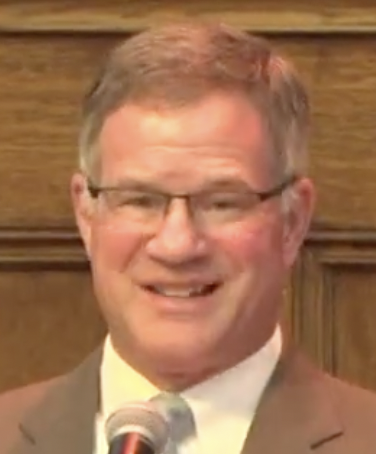

Nominee	Bruce Dammeier	Rick Talbert
Party	Republican	Democratic
Popular vote	172,441	158,120
Percentage	52.03%	47.71%
County Executive before election
Pat McCarthy
Democratic
Elected County Executive
Bruce Dammeier
Republican

The 2016 Pierce County Executive election took place on November 8, 2016, to elect the county executive of Pierce County, Washington. Incumbent Democratic County Executive Pat McCarthy was term-limited and could not run for re-election, instead successfully running for State Auditor.

Four candidates ran to succeed McCarthy: County Councilman Rick Talbert, a Democrat, and State Senator Bruce Dammeier, former State Senator Larry Faulk, and County Council Chairman Dan Roach, all Republicans. Roach, the son of State Senate President Pam Roach, ran for County Executive as his mother simultaneously ran for County Council.

In the primary election, Talbert placed first by a wide margin, winning 46 percent of the vote. He advanced to the general election with Dammeier, who won 30 percent of the vote to Roach's 16 percent and Faulk's 7 percent. On election night, Dammeier held a narrow edge over Talbert, but the race was not called until several days later, when it was confirmed that Dammeier had defeated Talbert with 52 percent of the vote.

== Primary election ==
=== Candidates ===
- Rick Talbert, County Councilman (Democratic)
- Bruce Dammeier, State Senator (Republican)
- Dan Roach, County Council Chairman (Republican)
- Larry Faulk, former State Senator (Republican)

=== Results ===
Primary election results
Party	Candidate	Votes	%
Democratic	Rick Talbert	65,082	46.13%
Republican	Bruce Dammeier	42,476	30.10%
Republican	Dan Roach	23,210	16.45%
Republican	Larry Faulk	10,078	7.14%
Write-in		247	0.18%
Total votes		141,093	100.00%

== General election ==
=== Results ===
2016 Pierce County Executive election
Party	Candidate	Votes	%
Republican	Bruce Dammeier	172,441	52.03%
Democratic	Rick Talbert	158,120	47.71%
Write-in		861	0.26%
Total votes		331,422	100.00%
Republican gain from Democratic			
