= Brock Jackley =

American politician (born 1947)

Member of the Washington House of Representatives from the 26th district
- In office January 8, 2001 – January 13, 2003
- Preceded by: Tom Huff
- Succeeded by: Lois McMahan

Personal details
- Born: 1947 (age 78–79)
- Party: Democratic
- Spouse: Laurie Jackley
- Education: Sandy High School
- Occupation: Businessman

Brock Jackley (born 1947) is an American businessman and politician in the state of Washington. He served in the Washington House of Representatives from 2001 to 2003 as a Democrat. He attended the University of Idaho and lives in Las Vegas, Nevada.
