= 2024 Pierce County Executive election =

- November 5, 2024

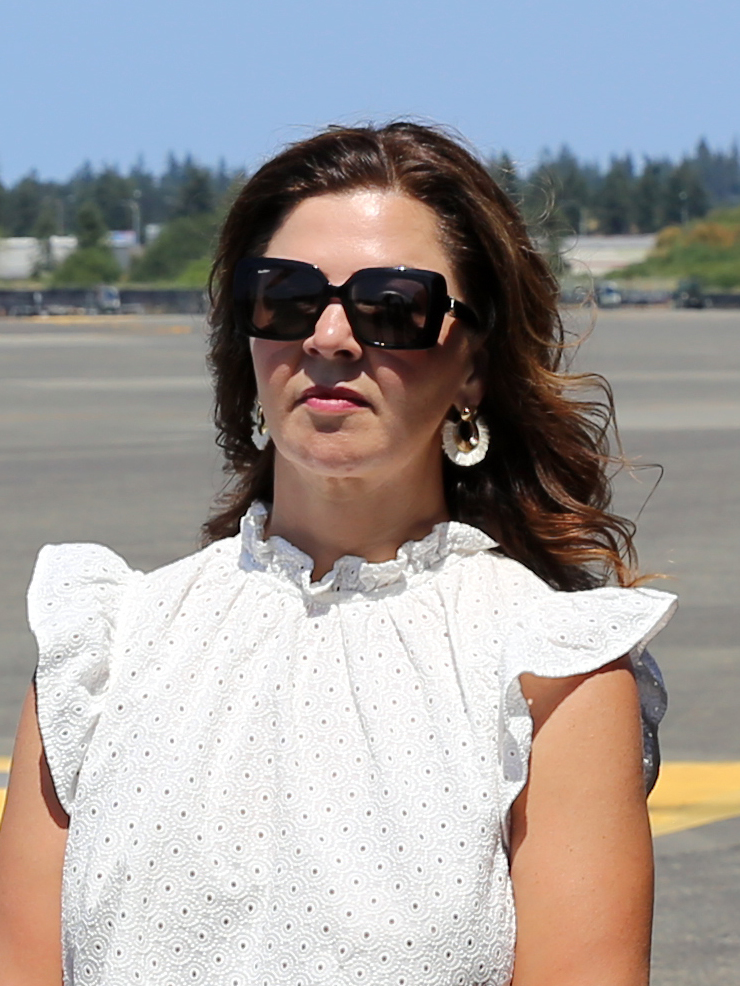
Nominee	Ryan Mello	Kelly Chambers
Party	Democratic	Republican
Popular vote	209,918	198,886
Percentage	51.28%	48.58%
County Executive before election
Bruce Dammeier
Republican
Elected County Executive
Ryan Mello
Democratic

The 2024 Pierce County Executive election took place on November 5, 2024, to elect the county executive of Pierce County, Washington. Incumbent Republican County Executive Bruce Dammeier was term limited and could not seek a third consecutive term. Democratic County Councilman Ryan Mello and Republican State Representative Kelly Chambers ran to succeed him in a campaign that revolved around the high price of housing.

In the primary election, Mello narrowly won first place, receiving 52 percent of the vote to Chambers's 48 percent. He ultimately won the general election by a similar margin, winning 51 percent of the vote and flipping control of the County Executive's office as Democrats won a majority on the County Council.

== Primary election ==
=== Candidates ===
- Ryan Mello, County Councilman (Democratic)
- Kelly Chambers, State Representative (Republican)

=== Results ===
Primary election results
Party	Candidate	Votes	%
Democratic	Ryan Mello	106,323	52.27%
Republican	Kelly Chambers	96,629	47.51%
Write-in		456	0.22%
Total votes		203,408	100.00%

== General election ==
=== Results ===
2024 Pierce County Executive election
Party	Candidate	Votes	%
Democratic	Ryan Mello	209,918	51.28%
Republican	Kelly Chambers	198,886	48.58%
Write-in		585	0.14%
Total votes		409,389	100.00%
Democratic gain from Republican			
