= Political positions of Amy Klobuchar =

Amy Jean Klobuchar (/ˈkloʊbəʃɑːr/; born May 25, 1960) is an American lawyer and politician serving as the senior United States senator from Minnesota. A member of the Minnesota Democratic-Farmer-Labor Party, Minnesota's affiliate of the Democratic Party, she previously served as the Hennepin County Attorney. She ran for the Democratic nomination for President of the United States in the 2020 election, before pulling out in March and endorsing Joe Biden.

Klobuchar's political positions have generally been in line with modern American liberalism. She is pro-choice on abortion, supports LGBT rights and the Affordable Care Act, and was critical of the Iraq War.

According to GovTrack, Klobuchar passed more legislation than any other senator by the end of the 114th Congress in late 2016. According to Congress.gov, as of December 16, 2018, she had sponsored or co-sponsored 111 pieces of legislation that became law. During the 115th Congress, she voted in line with President Donald Trump's position on legislation 31.1 percent of the time.

== Crime ==
=== Criminal justice reform ===
In December 2018, Klobuchar voted for the First Step Act, legislation aimed at reducing recidivism rates among federal prisoners through expanding job training and other programs in addition to forming an expansion of early-release programs and modifications on sentencing laws such as mandatory minimum sentences for nonviolent drug offenders, "to more equitably punish drug offenders."

On July 31, 2019, following Attorney General William Barr announcing that the United States federal government would resume the use of the death penalty for the first time in over 20 years, Klobuchar was a cosponsor of a bill banning the death penalty.

=== Gun laws ===
As of October 2018, Klobuchar has an "F" grade from the National Rifle Association Political Victory Fund (NRA-PVF) for supporting gun control legislation.

In the wake of the 2016 Orlando nightclub shooting, Klobuchar participated in the Chris Murphy gun control filibuster.

Following the Las Vegas shooting in October 2017, Klobuchar was one of 24 senators to sign a letter to National Institutes of Health (NIH) Director Dr. Francis Collins espousing the view that it was critical the NIH "dedicate a portion of its resources to the public health consequences of gun violence" at a time when 93 Americans die per day from gun-related fatalities and noted that the Dickey Amendment did not prohibit objective, scientific inquiries into shooting death prevention.

In November 2017, Klobuchar was a cosponsor of the Military Domestic Violence Reporting Enhancement Act, a bill that would form a charge of Domestic Violence under the Uniform Code of Military Justice (UCMJ) and stipulate that convictions would have to be reported to federal databases with the authority to keep abusers from purchasing firearms within three days in an attempt to close a loophole in the UCMJ through which convicted abusers retained the ability to purchase firearms.

In January 2019, Klobuchar was one of 40 senators to introduce the Background Check Expansion Act, a bill that would require background checks for either the sale or transfer of all firearms including all unlicensed sellers. Exceptions to the bill's background check requirement included transfers between members of law enforcement, loaning firearms for either hunting or sporting events on a temporary basis, providing firearms as gifts to members of one's immediate family, firearms being transferred as part of an inheritance, or giving a firearm to another person temporarily for immediate self-defense.

In February 2018, after the Stoneman Douglas High School shooting, Klobuchar was one of four Democratic senators to sign a letter to President Trump asserting that were he "to endorse legislation to require a background check on every gun purchase, without other poison pill provisions attached, we could finally move much closer towards the comprehensive system that you called for after the Stoneman Douglas attack" and that there was no justification in allowing individuals denied firearms by federally licensed dealers being able to "simply visit a gun show or go online to purchase the same gun that they were denied at the store."

In February 2019, Klobuchar was one of 38 senators to sign a letter to Senate Judiciary Committee Chairman Lindsey Graham calling on him to "hold a hearing" on universal background checks and noted Graham's statement in the press that he "intended to have the Committee work on ‘red flag’ legislation and potentially also background checks", actions the senators indicated their support for.

In May 2019, as Senate Democrats pressured Senate Majority Leader Mitch McConnell to allow a vote on a bill to renew the Violence Against Women Act, which included an amendment closing the "boyfriend loophole" which barred those convicted of abusing, assaulting or stalking a dating partner from buying or owning a firearm, Klobuchar advocated for the Senate passing the bill and called the measure crucial to protect women in the United States who died from gun violence at larger rates there than in other high-income countries.

At the Detroit Democratic debate on July 31, 2019, Klobuchar invoked the death of 6-year-old Stephen Romero in the Gilroy Garlic Festival shooting and noted that President Trump supported background checks in a meeting before changing his position following a separate meeting with pro-gun group before stating that she would not fold if elected president and would secure the passage of universal background checks.

=== Crime control ===
According to her Senate website, while serving as Attorney of Hennepin County, Klobuchar was "a leading advocate for successful passage of Minnesota's first felony DWI law". She also focused on the prosecution of violent and career criminals while serving as County Attorney.

Eric T. Schneiderman, the New York State Attorney General, praised Klobuchar's efforts for legislation against phone theft. In 2017 she took over sponsorship from Al Franken of a bill to provide grants for law enforcement personnel to receive training in how to question survivors of sexual assault and other trauma, after Franken was accused of sexual misconduct.

In 2011, Klobuchar introduced S.978, the Commercial Felony Streaming Act, a bill that would make unauthorized streaming of copyrighted material for the purpose of "commercial advantage or personal financial gain" a felony under US copyright law. Backed by the U.S. Chamber of Commerce and praised by industry groups, the legislation has been enormously unpopular among critics who believe it would apply to those who stream or post videos of copyrighted content on public sites such as YouTube.

== Economy ==
=== Agriculture ===
In March 2018, Klobuchar and Republican John Thune introduced the Agriculture Data Act, a bill that would direct the Secretary of Agriculture "to collect, collate, integrate, and link data relating to the impacts of covered conservation practices on enhancing crop yields, soil health, and otherwise reducing risk and improving farm and ranch profitability" in addition to granting the Agriculture Secretary the ability to form a data warehouse on the subjects of confidential cloud-based conservation and farm productivity that would reserve records of multiple analysis. Klobuchar stated that the bill would "ensure hardworking farmers are able to capitalize on the United States Department of Agriculture’s vast resources to streamline their operations, enhance yields, and increase profits."

In March 2019, Klobuchar was one of 38 senators to sign a letter to Agriculture Secretary Sonny Perdue warning that dairy farmers "have continued to face market instability and are struggling to survive the fourth year of sustained low prices" and urging his department to "strongly encourage these farmers to consider the Dairy Margin Coverage program."

In May 2019, Klobuchar was one of nine Democratic senators sent a letter to Perdue in which they criticized the USDA for purchasing pork from JBS USA and wrote that it was "counterproductive and contradictory" for companies to receive funding from "U.S. taxpayer dollars intended to help American farmers struggling with this administration's trade policy." The senators requested the department "ensure these commodity purchases are carried out in a manner that most benefits the American farmer’s bottom line—not the business interests of foreign corporations."

=== Company mergers and regulations ===
In February 2019, Klobuchar was one of eight senators to sign a letter to the Federal Communications Commission and Department of Justice advocating for regulators to reject a proposed $26 billion merger between T-Mobile and Sprint, writing that American enforcers have understood for the last 30 years "that fostering robust competition in telecommunications markets is the best way to provide every American with access to high-quality, cutting-edge communications at a reasonable price" and the merger would result in a return for "Americans to the dark days of heavily consolidated markets and less competition, with all of the resulting harms."

In March 2019, Klobuchar was one of six senators to have signed a letter to the Federal Trade Commission (FTC) requesting it "use its rulemaking authority, along with other tools, in order to combat the scourge of non-compete clauses rigging our economy against workers" and espousing the view that non-compete clauses "harm employees by limiting their ability to find alternate work, which leaves them with little leverage to bargain for better wages or working conditions with their immediate employer." The senators furthered that the FTC had the responsibility of protecting both consumers and workers and needed to "act decisively" to address their concerns over "serious anti-competitive harms from the proliferation of non-competes in the economy."

In June 2019, Klobuchar led six other Senate Democrats in signing letters to the FTC and the Department of Justice recounting that many of them had "called on both the FTC and the Justice Department to investigate potential anticompetitive activity in these markets, particularly following the significant enforcement actions taken by foreign competition enforcers against these same companies" and requested both agencies confirm whether or not opened antitrust investigations had been opened by them regarding each of the companies and for both agencies to pledge they will publicly release any such investigation's findings.

=== Housing ===
In April 2019, Klobuchar was one of 41 senators to sign a bipartisan letter to the housing subcommittee praising the Housing and Urban Development Departments's Section 4 Capacity Building program as authorizing "HUD to partner with national nonprofit community development organizations to provide education, training, and financial support to local community development corporations (CDC's) across the country" and expressing disappointment that President Trump's budget "has slated this program for elimination after decades of successful economic and community development." The senators wrote of their hope that the subcommittee would support continued funding for Section 4 in Fiscal Year 2020.

=== Labor laws ===
In July 2019, Klobuchar signed a letter to Secretary of Labor Alexander Acosta that advocated for the U.S. Occupational Safety and Health Administration to initiate a full investigation into a complaint filed on May 20 by a group of Chicago-area employees of McDonald's, which detailed workplace violence incidents that included interactions with customers such as customers throwing hot coffee and threatening employees with firearms and more. The senators argued that McDonald's could and needed to "do more to protect its employees, but employers will not take seriously their obligations to provide a safe workplace if OSHA does not enforce workers rights to a hazard-free workplace."

In July 2019, when asked by Royceann Porter of the Teamsters 238 union what she would do as president to stand up for temporary workers, Klobuchar replied that the first thing needed was to "make it easy for people to organize" and that union organizers would "have to explain to Iowa and to the rest of the country — this president has not kept his promise to those workers where he said he was going to stand up for them."

=== Taxation ===
In July 2017, during a tour of Canal Park Brewing as part of her promotion of a tax cut for microbreweries, Klobuchar said they were jobs in the United States that were not going anywhere and one thing needed was the encouragement of "more of these small businesses and especially these small breweries." She acknowledged the tax cut had been introduced in the past, but stated the possibility of the Craft Beverage Modernization and Tax Reform Act being passed as part of broader tax reform scheduled for later that year.

In 2019 Klobuchar was a sponsor of the Gold Star Family Tax Relief Act, a bill that would undo a provision in the Tax Cuts and Jobs Act of 2017 that raised the tax on the benefit children receive from a parent's Department of Defense survivor benefits plan up to 37% compared with an average of 12% to 15% prior to the 2017 tax bill. In a news release, Klobuchar reflected that when she "learned about the unacceptable mistake in the 2017 tax law that unduly burdened our Gold Star families, my colleagues and I moved immediately to fix the problem". The bill passed in the Senate in May 2019.

=== Trade ===
In 2010, Klobuchar opposed the Trans-Pacific Partnership "because she [had] concerns about whether the proposed legislation [was] strong enough for American workers".

== Education ==
In February 2019, Klobuchar came out against tuition free, four-year college for all, while saying she supports free community colleges.

In March 2019, Klobuchar was one of 13 senators to sign a letter to Secretary of Education Betsy DeVos calling for the U.S. Department of Education to do more to assist Argosy University students as they faced campus closures across the U.S. and critiquing the Education Department as failing to provide adequate measures to protect students or keep them notified of ongoing updates.

In July 2019, Klobuchar addressed the National Education Association, saying that her first plan was to increase pay for teachers that would be financed through changes to the estate tax and warned that the United States was "not going to compete with the rest of the world if we don’t invest in our schools."

== Environment ==
=== Climate change ===
In December 2014, Klobuchar was one of six Democratic senators to sign a letter to the Environmental Protection Agency (EPA) urging the agency to give states more time to comply with its rule on power plants as the final rule "must provide adequate time for the design, permitting and construction of such large scale capital intensive infrastructure" and calling for an elimination of the 2020 targets in the final rule, a mandate that states take action by 2020 as part of the EPA's goal to reach a 30 percent carbon cut by 2030.

In November 2018, the Trump administration released a climate change report warning of dire consequences if the U.S. did not change its policies. The report was released the day after Thanksgiving, generally one of the slowest news days of the year. Klobuchar stated administration officials "couldn't pick a day where they tried to get less attention" and expressed her view that the attempt backfired given "a lot of people are signing up to get the overview of the report" as a result of no other news receiving attention the day the report was made public. She advocated for the implementation of greenhouse gas rules and gas mileage standards along with the United States reentering the Paris Agreement.

In November 2018, Klobuchar was one of 25 Democratic senators to cosponsor a resolution in response to findings of the Intergovernmental Panel on Climate Change (IPCC) report and National Climate Assessment. The resolution affirmed the senators' acceptance of the findings and their support for bold action to address climate change.

In a February 2019 interview with Bret Baier, Klobuchar was asked how she would vote on the Green New Deal if it came up for a vote in the Senate, replying, "I see it as aspirational, I see it as a jump start. So I would vote yes, but I would also, if it got down to the nitty-gritty of an actual legislation as opposed to, 'oh, here are some goals we have,' that would be different for me." Klobuchar added that she was "for a jump-start of the discussion" as espoused in the Green New Deal's framework by fellow senator Ed Markey.

In June 2019, Klobuchar was one of 44 senators to introduce the International Climate Accountability Act, a piece of legislation that would prevent President Trump from using funds in an attempt to withdraw from the Paris Agreement and directing the president's administration to instead develop a strategic plan for the United States that would allow it to meet its commitment under the Paris Agreement.

In June 2019, after Politico reported that the Department of Agriculture had mostly ceased promoting its own climate science, Klobuchar sent a letter to Agriculture Secretary Sonny Perdue requesting the Agriculture Department to offer an explanation for not publicizing certain studies and called for an immediate release of "any [Agricultural Research Service] study related to climate science that was ignored, downplayed, or its findings held back."

=== Conservation ===
In January 2017, Klobuchar was one of five senators to cosponsor a bill that would lift federal protections for gray wolves in both the Midwest and Wyoming in an attempt to prevent courts from overruling an Interior Department decision to remove wolves in Wyoming, Wisconsin, Minnesota, and Michigan from the endangered species list.

In May 2019, Klobuchar and Republican James Risch reintroduced the Recreational Trails Program Funding Transparency Act, a bipartisan bill mandating the Secretary of Transportation give a report regarding the amount of non-highway recreational fuel taxes administered to the Recreational Trails Program for the purpose of assisting Congress in determining the appropriate funding level for the program. Klobuchar called environmental conservation "a fundamental part of Minnesota's heritage" and said the bill would "help ensure that states receive the resources they need to protect and improve these trails for generations to come."

=== Water pollution ===
In May 2019, Klobuchar and Republican Marco Rubio introduced the Local Water Protection Act, a bipartisan bill that would reauthorize the Environmental Protection Agency's (EPA) Section 319 grant program, which had provided funding opportunities for states to develop and implement their own programs for managing non-point source water pollution. The bill also increased funding for Section 319 from $70 million a year to $200 million for Fiscal Years 2020 through 2024. Klobuchar said her state took the quality of its "10,000 lakes very seriously, and we all want to preserve the quality of these important waterways for generations to come" and that the bill "would give local and state governments the resources they need to create the best voluntary conservation programs to ensure that their water is clean and free of harmful pollutants."

=== Wood building ===
In May 2016, Klobuchar was a cosponsor of the Timber Innovation Act, a bipartisan bill introduced by Mike Crapo and Debbie Stabenow that would incentivize investment by the National Forest Products Lab as well as American colleges and universities to conduct both research and development on alternative methods for wood building construction. The bill also supported attempts by the Agriculture Department to further support wood products being used as a building material for tall buildings.

== Government oversight ==
=== Campaign finance ===
In June 2019, Klobuchar and Senator Mark Warner introduced the Preventing Adversaries Internationally from Disbursing Advertising Dollars (PAID AD) Act, a bill that would modify U.S. federal campaign finance laws to outlaw the purchasing of ads that name a political candidate and appear on platforms by foreign nationals in the midst of an election year. Klobuchar issued a statement saying that the intelligence community had identified foreign powers as continuing to interfere in American elections and changing laws to ban foreign officials and governments from buying political advertisements "is necessary to ensure American elections are free and fair."

=== Election security ===
In January 2017, Klobuchar was one of six Democratic senators to introduce legislation that would form an independent counsel with the ability to probe potential Russian cyber attacks on political systems and investigate efforts by Russians to interfere in American elections with roughly eighteen months to hand over its findings and recommendations to Congress.

In February 2017, Klobuchar led 25 senators in signing a letter to the Election Assistance Commission (EAC) requesting that the commission detail cybersecurity challenges to state and local officials amid their attempts to safeguard future elections and also secure the 2016 election from Russian hackers.

In June 2017, Klobuchar sent a letter to National Security Advisor H.R. McMaster requesting he meet with the Senate Rules Committee on the subject of allegations that Russia attempted to interfere in the 2016 election, citing the necessity of the Senate to "have all of the information necessary to ensure that future elections are safeguarded from foreign interference" amid its investigation into what extent Russia interfered in the election and called for McMaster to consider "making information that could be helpful to protecting critical infrastructure publicly available immediately."

In October 2017, Klobuchar and Senator Mark Warner unveiled the Honest Ads Act at a news conference, legislation that mandated large digital platforms keep a public repository of paid political advertising that appear on their sites and abolish "what has been a major discrepancy between how political activity is regulated online compared with broadcast television and radio." The bill was in response to a revelation by Facebook, Inc. the previous month in which the company disclosed a discovery of roughly 500 inauthentic accounts responsible for more than $100,000 in advertising associated with the election and opined that the accounts were linked to Russia.

On December 21, 2017, Klobuchar was one of six senators to introduce the Secure Elections Act, legislation that would authorize block grants to states to update outdated voting technology as well as form a program for an independent panel of experts that would work toward the development of cybersecurity guidelines for election systems that states could then implement, along with offering states resources to install the recommendations.

In June 2018, Klobuchar and Senator Sherrod Brown introduced the Save Voters Act, a bill that would serve as an amendment to the National Voter Registration Act while asserting that a state cannot use an individual's failure to vote or respond to a state notice as reason for removing them from voter rolls. In reference to the Ohio Supreme Court ruling to uphold the state's "use it or lose it" policy the earlier that month, Klobuchar said, "We should be doing everything we can to encourage participation in elections and strengthen voting rights, yet last week's Supreme Court decision will allow states to make it harder — not easier — for more Americans to vote."

In August 2018, during an interview on NBC's Meet the Press, Klobuchar stated that President Trump's downplaying of Russian interference in the 2016 election posed a threat to national security and she wished he would listen to members of the intelligence community "but what we have right now is a common set of facts between at least Democrats and Republicans in the Senate, and a common purpose to protect our democracy." Klobuchar added that she would "love to see this broadened out so we start to discuss also the threats to our power grid system, the threats to our financial system, because the Russians aren't just stopping at the election equipment."

In November 2018, Klobuchar and Republican Senator Dan Sullivan introduced legislation to create a new State Department program offering grants to American nonprofit groups for working on election security and sharing information with similar groups in other countries.

In April 2019, Klobuchar was one of twelve Democratic senators to sign a letter led by Mazie Hirono that questioned the decision of Attorney General William Barr to offer "his own conclusion that the President’s conduct did not amount to obstruction of justice" and called for both the Justice Department's inspector general and the Office of Professional Responsibility to launch an investigation into whether Barr's summary of the Mueller Report and his April 18 news conference were misleading.

During the June 27, 2019 Miami Democratic debate, Klobuchar warned, "We let the Republicans run our elections, and if we do not do something about Russian interference in the election, and we let Mitch McConnell stop all the back-up paper ballots, then we are not going to get to do what we want to do."

In July 2019, Klobuchar and Senator Jack Reed sent a letter to Acting Homeland Security Secretary Kevin McAleenan requesting an explanation of the actions taken by the Department of Homeland security in response to "unexpected behavior" of voting equipment in Durham County, North Carolina during the 2016 presidential election and opined that it was "critical that we learn as much as we can about the extent of the attacks we faced in 2016, and that these lessons be shared as widely as possible so that our nation is fully prepared for the 2020 elections."

=== Government surveillance ===
In August 2007, Klobuchar was one of 16 Democratic senators and 41 Democratic congresspeople to vote for the Protect America Act of 2007, which was heavily criticized by civil libertarians. Klobuchar did, however, vote against granting legal immunity to telecom corporations that cooperated with the NSA warrantless surveillance program.

Klobuchar voted in favor of the Intelligence Authorization Act of 2008, which included a provision to ban the use of waterboarding by the United States.

During the hearing of U.S. Supreme Court nominee Elena Kagan, Klobuchar disagreed with Senator Tom Coburn when he questioned the nominee about his perception that Americans were "losing freedom" over the past 30 years. Klobuchar argued that the "free society" Coburn favored was one in which women were underrepresented in government, including no representation on the Supreme Court or the Senate Judiciary Committee.

=== Census ===
In June 2019, Klobuchar was one of 28 senators to sign a letter led by Brian Schatz to Commerce Secretary Wilbur Ross warning that Ross would "further delay and jeopardize the Census Bureau’s ability to conduct a full, fair, and accurate decennial census as required by the U.S. Constitution and the Census Act" by continuing to attempt adding the citizenship question to 2020 census materials. The senators urged Ross to "allow the Census Bureau to proceed with preparation for a 2020 census without a citizenship question on the questionnaire."

=== Government shutdown ===
In March 2019, Klobuchar and 38 other senators signed a letter to the Appropriations Committee opining that contractor workers and by extension their families "should not be penalized for a government shutdown that they did nothing to cause" while noting that there were bills in both chambers of Congress that if enacted would provide back pay to compensate contractor employees for lost wages before urging the Appropriations Committee "to include back pay for contractor employees in a supplemental appropriations bill for FY2019 or as part of the regular appropriations process for FY2020."

== Foreign policy ==
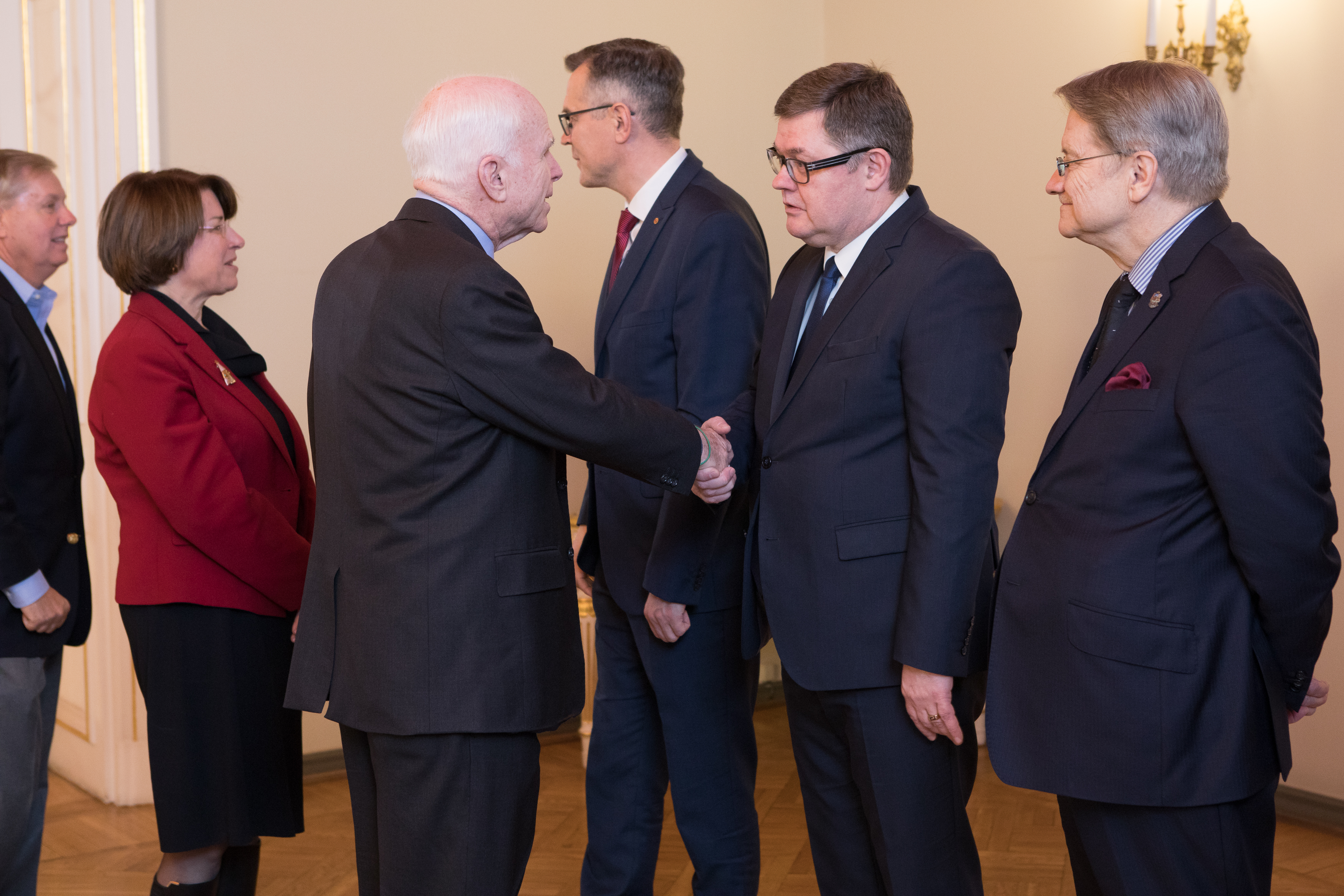
Klobuchar with Lindsey Graham and John McCain in Latvia in 2016

In March 2007, Klobuchar went on an official trip to Iraq with Senate colleagues Sheldon Whitehouse, John E. Sununu, and Lisa Murkowski. She noted that U.S. troops were completing their job and working arduously to train the Iraqis.

Klobuchar opposed President George W. Bush's plan to increase troop levels in Iraq in January 2007. In May 2007, after Bush vetoed a bill (which Klobuchar voted for) that would fund the troops but impose time limits on the Iraq War, and supporters failed to garner enough congressional votes to override his veto, Klobuchar voted for additional funding for Iraq without such time limits, saying she "simply could not stomach the idea of using our soldiers as bargaining chips".

In December 2010, Klobuchar voted for the ratification of New START, a nuclear arms reduction treaty between the United States and the Russian Federation obliging both countries to have no more than 1,550 strategic warheads and 700 launchers deployed during the next seven years, and providing for a continuation of on-site inspections that halted when START I expired the previous year. It was the first arms treaty with Russia in eight years.

In 2011, Klobuchar supported American military intervention in Libya.

In October 2016, Klobuchar was one of 12 senators to sign a letter to President Barack Obama urging his administration "to consider all options for increasing China’s compliance with its international trade obligations, including a potential case brought with our allies at the World Trade Organization and a pause of other trade negotiations with China, such as the Bilateral Investment Treaty talk" and asserting that U.S. steel companies and steelworkers would only get the relief they needed though the implementation of "strong enforcement measures into our strategy to reduce excess global capacity".

In March 2017, Klobuchar and Senator John Cornyn introduced a bill that would mandate the Defense Department reclassify deployments to the Sinai Peninsula as combat zone assignments, complete with the corresponding tax breaks that come from the proposed arrangement. Klobuchar observed, "As terrorist groups like ISIS spread throughout the region, the dangers these service members face has increased. Current rules regarding benefits for those serving in the Sinai do not reflect these new threats."

In November 2017, in response to efforts by China to purchase tech companies based in the U.S., Klobuchar was among nine senators to cosponsor a bill that would broaden the federal government's ability to prevent foreign purchases of U.S. firms through increasing the strength of the Committee on Foreign Investment in the United States (CFIUS). The scope of the CFIUS would be expanded to allow it to review along with possibly decline smaller investments and add additional national security factors for CFIUS to consider including if information about Americans would be exposed as part of transactions or whether the deal would facilitate fraud.

In March 2018, Klobuchar voted against tabling a resolution spearheaded by Bernie Sanders, Chris Murphy, and Mike Lee that would have required President Trump to withdraw American troops either in or influencing Yemen within the next 30 days unless they were combating Al-Qaeda. In October 2018, Klobuchar was one of eight senators to sign a letter to National Intelligence Director Dan Coats requesting a classified briefing on what the intelligence community knew about threats to Saudi journalist Jamal Khashoggi so that the senators may fulfill their "oversight obligation".

In January 2019, following Juan Guaidó's self-declaration as interim President of Venezuela, Klobuchar told HuffPost that she supported the opposition to Nicolás Maduro.

In February 2019, Klobuchar supported the Israel Anti-Boycott Act, which would make it legal for states to refuse to do business with contractors that engage in boycotts against Israel.

In April 2019, Klobuchar was among 34 senators to sign a letter to President Trump encouraging him "to listen to members of your own Administration and reverse a decision that will damage our national security and aggravate conditions inside Central America", asserting that President Trump had "consistently expressed a flawed understanding of U.S. foreign assistance" since becoming president and that he was "personally undermining efforts to promote U.S. national security and economic prosperity" through preventing the use of Fiscal Year 2018 national security funding. The senators argued that foreign assistance to Central American countries created less migration to the U.S., citing the funding's helping to improve conditions in those countries.

Klobuchar supports ending all U.S. involvement in the Saudi Arabian-led intervention in Yemen.

=== Iran ===
In May 2018, Klobuchar was among 12 senators to sign a letter to President Donald Trump urging him to remain in the Iran nuclear deal on the grounds that "Iran could either remain in the agreement and seek to isolate the U.S. from our closest partners, or resume its nuclear activities" if the US pulled out and that both possibilities "would be detrimental to our national security interests."

In January 2020, Klobuchar admitted to having anticipated tensions escalating between the US and Iran after Trump removed the US from the Iran nuclear deal and criticized the lack of congressional approval: "We shouldn’t be entering any kind of conflict anywhere, much less in the Mideast, without him going to Congress to ask for an authorization of military force. He does not have that right to make that decision."

== Health and safety ==
=== Drug policy ===
In June 2016, along with Republicans Chuck Grassley and Mike Lee and fellow Democrat Patrick Leahy, Klobuchar was one of four senators to introduce a bill that would authorize generic manufacturers facing either the Food and Drug Administration being misused by brand-name drug companies in order to prevent them from getting drug samples or an inability to share a safety protocol to file a lawsuit that would mandate access to a sample or force negotiations for a safety protocol. The bill's intent was to prevent big pharmaceutical companies from using safety rules in an attempt to prevent generic drugs from coming to market.

In November 2016, along with Chuck Grassley and Richard Blumenthal, Klobuchar sent a letter to Mylan Chief Executive Heather Bresch expressing concern that Mylan may have overcharged military members for EpiPen and questioned when Mylan would reimburse the Defense Department.

In December 2016, Klobuchar was one of 17 senators to sign a letter to President-elect Donald Trump asking him to fulfill a campaign pledge to bring down the cost of prescription drugs, stating their willingness "to advance measures to achieve this goal", and calling on Trump "to partner with Republicans and Democrats alike to take meaningful steps to address the high cost of prescription drugs through bold administrative and legislative actions."

In February 2017, Klobuchar was one of 31 senators to sign a letter to Kaléo Pharmaceuticals in response to the opioid-overdose-reversing device Evzio rising in price from $690 in 2014 to $4,500 and requested the company answer what the detailed price structure for Evzio was, the number of devices Kaléo Pharmaceuticals set aside for donation, and the totality of federal reimbursements Evzio received in the previous year.

In March 2017, Klobuchar was one of 21 senators to sign a letter led by Ed Markey to Senate Majority Leader Mitch McConnell which noted that 12 percent of adult Medicaid beneficiaries had some form or a substance abuse disorder in addition to one third of treatment administered for opioid and other substance use disorders in the United States being financed through Medicaid and opined that the American Health Care Act could "very literally translate into a death spiral for those with opioid use disorders" due to the insurance coverage lacking and not having the adequate funds to afford care oftentimes resulting in individuals abandoning substance use disorder treatment.

In June 2018, Klobuchar co-sponsored the bipartisan STATES Act proposed in the 115th Congress by Senators Elizabeth Warren and Cory Gardner that would exempt individuals or corporations in compliance with state cannabis laws from federal enforcement of the Controlled Substances Act.

In February 2018, Klobuchar introduced the CARA 2.0, a follow-up bill to the Comprehensive Addiction and Recovery Act (CARA) that included imposing a three-day initial prescribing limit on opioids for acute pain along with increasing services to promote recovery and attempting to widen the availability of treatment. At a news conference, Klobuchar described CARA 2.0 as "a blueprint for the country in terms of training on naloxone and in terms of authorization for money."

In December 2018, Klobuchar was one of 21 senators to sign a letter to Food and Drug Commissioner Scott Gottlieb stating their approval of the actions of the Food and Drug Administration (FDA) to hinder youth access to e-cigarettes and urging the FDA "to take additional, stronger steps to prevent and reduce e-cigarette use among youth."

In January 2019, Catherine Cortez Masto announced that she and Klobuchar were sponsoring legislation authorizing "the largest purchaser of prescription medications, Medicare, to negotiate drug prices and to hold pharmaceutical companies accountable for the rising prices of prescription drugs."

In June 2019, Klobuchar was one of 15 senators to introduce the Affordable Medications Act, a bill intended to promote transparency through mandating pharmaceutical companies disclose the amount of money going toward research and development in addition to both marketing and executives' salaries. The bill also abolished the restriction that stopped the federal Medicare program from using its buying power to negotiate lower drug prices for beneficiaries and hinder drug company monopoly practices used to keep prices high and disable less expensive generics entering the market.

=== Food policy ===
When the Healthy, Hunger-Free Kids Act of 2010 raised the possibility that pizza sauce would no longer be counted as a serving of vegetables in school lunches, threatening the $3 billion-dollar Schwan Company of Minnesota, Klobuchar, along with Minnesota Senator Al Franken and six Minnesota representatives, petitioned the USDA not to change the rating of tomato paste. The proposed change didn't pass.

=== Health insurance ===
Klobuchar voted for the Patient Protection and Affordable Care Act (a.k.a. Obamacare) in December 2009 and she voted for the Health Care and Education Reconciliation Act of 2010. In December 2012, she advocated to "repeal or reduce" the tax on medical devices included in the Affordable Care Act, as it would be harmful to businesses in her state. Despite this, on September 30, 2013, Klobuchar voted to remove a provision that would repeal the medical device tax from a government funding bill in opposition to the provision being used as a condition in keeping the government open. In January 2015, Klobuchar was one of 17 senators to co-sponsor S. 149, a bill to retroactively repeal the device excise tax. She has said that the medical device tax threatens jobs, even though her statements have been questioned by investigative journalists. Medtronic spent more than any other medical device company to lobby against the device tax in 2014, with Klobuchar as one of Medtronic's top recipients of political action committee (PAC) donations.

In December 2018, after U.S. District Court Judge Reed O'Connor ruled that the Affordable Care Act was unconstitutional, Klobuchar called the ruling "absurd" and said that at a time when the Trump administration "seems bound and determined to take away people's health care, we have to protect the ability of people to even have their health care even exist."

In December 2018, Klobuchar was among 42 senators to sign a letter to Trump administration officials Alex Azar, Seema Verma, and Steve Mnuchin arguing that the administration was improperly using Section 1332 of the Affordable Care Act to authorize states to "increase health care costs for millions of consumers while weakening protections for individuals with pre-existing conditions." The senators requested the administration withdraw the policy and "re-engage with stakeholders, states, and Congress."

In January 2019, during the 2018–19 United States federal government shutdown, Klobuchar was among 34 senators to sign a letter to FDA Commissioner Scott Gottlieb recognizing the efforts of the FDA to address the shutdown's effect on the public health and employees while remaining alarmed "that the continued shutdown will result in increasingly harmful effects on the agency’s employees and the safety and security of the nation’s food and medical products."

In February 2019, Klobuchar was among 23 Democratic senators to introduce the State Public Option Act, a bill that would authorize states to form a Medicaid buy-in program for all residents and thereby grant all denizens of the state the ability to buy into a state-driven Medicaid health insurance plan if they wished. Brian Schatz, a bill cosponsor, said the bill would "unlock each state’s Medicaid program to anyone who wants it, giving people a high-quality, low-cost public health insurance option" and that its goal was "to make sure that every single American has comprehensive health care coverage."

In August 2019, Klobuchar was one of 19 senators to sign a letter to Treasury Secretary Steve Mnuchin and Health and Human Services Secretary Alex Azar requesting data from the Trump administration in order to aid in the comprehension of states and Congress on potential consequences in the event that the Texas v. United States Affordable Care Act (ACA) lawsuit prevailed in courts, citing that an overhaul of the present health care system would form "an enormous hole in the pocketbooks of the people we serve as well as wreck state budgets".

=== Railroad safety ===
In June 2019, Klobuchar was one of 10 senators to cosponsor the Safe Freight Act, a bill that would mandate all freight trains have one or more certified conductors and one certified engineer on board who can collaborate on how to protect both the train and people living near the tracks' safety. The legislation was meant to correct a rollback of the Federal Railroad Administration on a proposed rule intended to establish safety standards.

=== Recreation advocacy ===
Klobuchar has been an active supporter of outdoor recreation legislation, including the Recreational Trails Program (RTP). When the Senate Environment and Public Works Committee passed MAP-21, trail interests and state park officials warned that the new policy could effectively end the program by relegating recreational trail projects to competition for funding among a broad category of authorized non-highway projects. Klobuchar led efforts to alter the proposal, working closely with recreation interests to develop a floor amendment that would reauthorize the RTP program unchanged. Although she faced bipartisan leadership in support of the committee's proposal, Klobuchar managed to secure acceptance of her new language by the legislation's floor manager, and she won strong bipartisan support for her amendment. The result was Senate passage in early 2012 of new surface transportation legislation, which continued RTP with $85 million in guaranteed annual funds and no significant change in its operations.

As chair of the Subcommittee on Competitiveness, Innovation, and Export Promotion, she played a key role in the 2010 passage of the Travel Promotion Act and the creation of Brand USA, an advertising effort to recover the traditional U.S. share of the international tourism market that will highlight national parks and their natural treasures. With Klobuchar's active support, the program has been granted $100 million per annum in matching federal funding, is widely expected to bring millions of additional visitors and billions of dollars to the U.S. and its parks each year, and has become the focus of a major White House initiative.

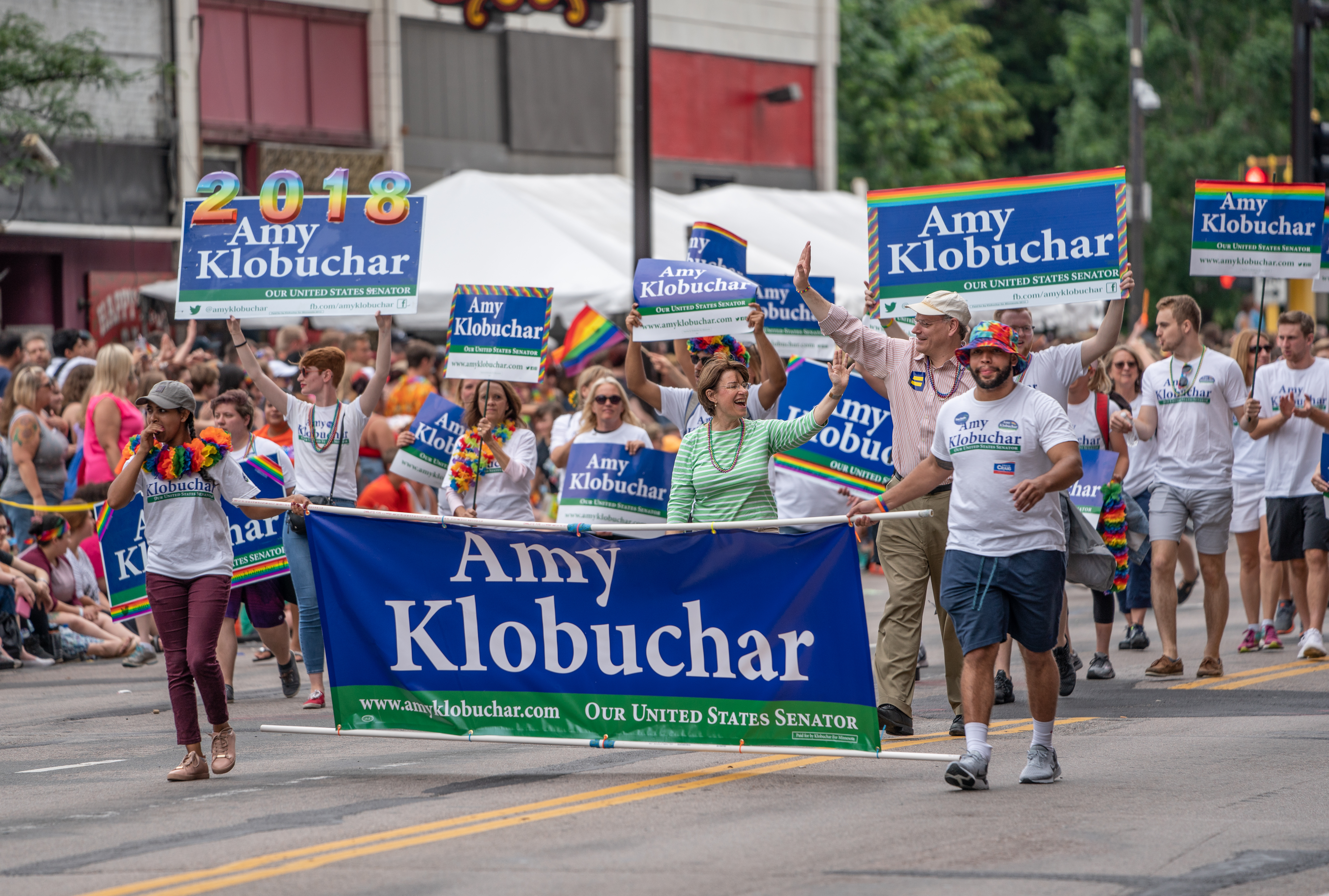
Klobuchar at Twin Cities Pride Parade in 2018

On June 6, 2012, Klobuchar received the Sheldon Coleman Great Outdoors Award at a special Great Outdoors Week celebration presented by the American Recreation Coalition. The award, created in 1989 to honor the lifelong efforts of Sheldon Coleman, is presented to individuals whose personal efforts have contributed substantially to enhancing outdoor experiences across America. The winner is selected by a panel of 100 national recreation community leaders, ranging from corporate executives to key federal and state officials and nonprofit organization community leaders. Klobuchar is the fifth woman, and the first woman serving in Congress, to receive the honor.

== Immigration ==
In January 2013, Klobuchar was one of four senators to sponsor the Immigration Innovation Act, a bill intended to increase STEM visas and use the fees obtained from the aforementioned visa applications as a means of funding STEM education programs within the U.S.

In a July 2018 interview, when asked about eliminating Immigration and Customs Enforcement amid other Democrats supporting abolishing the agency, Klobuchar stated, "I think what has to change are the policies, and the people that are making these policies are making horrendous decisions like separating kids from their parents." She added that the US would always "need immigration enforcement" and referred to America as "a major country with major borders", thereafter condemning the Trump administration's rhetoric on immigration: "I am just appalled by how this administration has been talking about immigrants. They don't diminish America, they are America."

In January 2019, Klobuchar was one of 20 senators to sponsor the Dreamer Confidentiality Act, a bill banning the Department of Homeland Security (DHS) from passing information collected on DACA recipients to Immigration and Customs Enforcement (ICE), Customs and Border Protection (CBP), the Department of Justice, or any other law enforcement agency with exceptions in the case of fraudulent claims, national security issues, or non-immigration related felonies.

In April 2019, Klobuchar signed a letter led by Catherine Cortez Masto to Immigrations and Customs Enforcement and Customs and Border Enforcement asserting that "the civil detention of an expectant mother for potential immigration offenses is never justified" due to the "absence of compelling evidence that the detention of a pregnant woman is necessary because she is a threat to herself or others, or is a threat to public safety or national security". The senators requested the CBP enact measures that would ensure "timely and appropriate treatment" for pregnant women in custody along with both agencies providing information on how available facilities and doctors are for pregnant immigrants and complete data on the number of those currently in custody.

In April 2019, Klobuchar was one of 19 senators to sign a letter to top members on the Appropriations Committee Richard Shelby and Patrick Leahy and top members of its Homeland Security subcommittee Shelley Moore Capito and Jon Tester indicating that they could not "support the appropriation of funds that would expand this administration’s unnecessarily cruel immigration enforcement policies, its inhumane immigrant detention systems, or its efforts to build the president’s vanity projects" and urging Congress to "resist efforts to raid critical and effective public safety programs in order to pay for political theatrics" as President Trump's "manufactured emergency" was not justification for "spending taxpayer dollars on an ineffective wall."

In May 2019, President Trump announced an immigration plan that would move the U.S. toward a "merit-based" system favoring highly skilled workers over migrants with family members living here, Klobuchar responding that she was bothered by the plan due to "the fact that he doesn’t deal with the Dreamers, he doesn’t deal with the millions of people who came here with no fault of their own, he doesn’t deal with the 10 million people that are here now, many of whom would like to see if they follow the law, learn English, they want to be on a path to citizenship."

In June 2019, following the Housing and Urban Development Department's confirmation that DACA recipients did not meet eligibility for federal backed loans, Klobuchar and eleven other senators introduced The Home Ownership Dreamers Act, legislation that mandated that the federal government was not authorized to deny mortgage loans backed by the Federal Housing Administration, Fannie Mae, Freddie Mac, or the Agriculture Department solely due to the immigration status of an applicant.

In June 2019, Klobuchar was one of seven Democratic senators who were led by Hawaii Senator Brian Schatz in sending letters to the Government Accountability Office along with the suspension and debarment official and inspector general at the U.S. Department of Health and Human Services citing recent reports that showed "significant evidence that some federal contractors and grantees have not provided adequate accommodations for children in line with legal and contractual requirements" and urged officials in the government to determine whether federal contractors and grantees are in violation of contractual obligations or federal regulations and should thus face financial consequences.

In July 2019, along with Kamala Harris and Kirsten Gillibrand, Klobuchar sent a letter to the Office of Refugee Resettlement asserting that the agency "should be prioritizing reunification of every child as soon as possible as opposed to prolonging stays in government custody.

In July 2019, following reports that the Trump administration intended to end protections of spouses, parents and children of active-duty service members from deportation, Klobuchar was one of twenty-two senators to sign a letter led by Tammy Duckworth arguing that the program allowed service members the ability "to fight for the United States overseas and not worry that their spouse, children, or parents will be deported while they are away" and that the program's termination would cause both personal hardship and a negatively impact for service members in combat.

In July 2019, Klobuchar and 15 other Senate Democrats introduced the Protecting Sensitive Locations Act which mandated that ICE agents get approval from a supervisor ahead of engaging in enforcement actions at sensitive locations with the exception of special circumstances and that agents receive annual training in addition to being required to report annually regarding enforcement actions in those locations.

== Journalism ==
In July 2019, Klobuchar was one of eight senators to cosponsor the Fallen Journalists Memorial Act, a bill introduced by Ben Cardin and Rob Portman that would create a new memorial that would be privately funded and constructed on federal lands within Washington, D.C. in order to honor journalists, photographers, and broadcasters that have died in the line of duty.

== Social issues ==
=== Child care ===
In 2019, Klobuchar was one of 35 senators to have introduced the Child Care for Working Families Act, a bill that created 770,000 new child care jobs and that ensured families under 75 percent of the state median income did not pay for child care with higher earning families having to pay "their fair share for care on a sliding scale, regardless of the number of children they have." The legislation also supported universal access to high-quality preschool programs for all 3 and 4-year-olds and gave the child care workforce a changed compensation and training to aid both teachers and caregivers.

=== Children's programming ===
In 2019, following the announcement by the Federal Communications Commission (FCC) of rules changes to children's programming through modifying the Children's Television Act of 1990, Klobuchar and eight other Democratic senators signed a letter to FCC Chairman Ajit Pai that expressed concern that the proposed changes "would limit the reach of educational content available to children and have a particular damaging effect on youth in low-income and minority communities" and asserted that the new rules would see a reduction in access to valuable educational content through over-the-air services.

=== LGBT rights ===
In May 2017, Klobuchar was one of 46 senators to introduce the Equality Act of 2017, described by Representative David Cicilline as ensuring "that every LGBT person can live their lives free from the fear of discrimination. Above all, it's about honoring the values that have guided our nation since its founding. It's critical that Congress pass the Equality Act into law."

=== Human trafficking ===
Klobuchar has sponsored and co-sponsored several pieces of legislation aimed at stopping human trafficking that have become law, including the Combating Human Trafficking in Commercial Vehicles Act; the No Human Trafficking on Our Roads Act; S.2974 (which funded the U.S. National Human Trafficking Hotline); and the Justice for Victims of Trafficking Act of 2015.

=== Worker's rights ===
In March 2018, along with Kirsten Gillibrand and Patty Murray, Klobuchar led a letter signed by all 22 female U.S. Senators to Senate Majority Leader Mitch McConnell and Senate Minority Leader Chuck Schumer that called for changes to a 1995 statute that formed the present policy for addressing workplace misconduct complaints on Capitol Hill and specified their support for an update to the policy that would streamline the process of reporting sexual harassment in addition to granting staffers more resources in filing reports.

In April 2019, Klobuchar signed onto the Be HEARD Act, legislation intended to abolish the tipped minimum wage along with ending mandatory arbitration and pre-employment nondisclosure agreements. The bill also gave workers additional time to report harassment and was said by co-sponsor Patty Murray to come at a time when too many workers are "still silenced by mandatory disclosure agreements that prevent them from discussing sexual harassment and longstanding practices like the tipped wages that keep workers in certain industries especially vulnerable."

=== Veterans ===
In December 2018, Klobuchar was one of 21 senators to sign a letter to Veterans Affairs Secretary Robert Wilkie calling it "appalling that the VA is not conducting oversight of its own outreach efforts" even though suicide prevention is the VA's highest clinical priority, and requesting that Wilkie "consult with experts with proven track records of successful public and mental health outreach campaigns with a particular emphasis on how those individuals measure success."

In 2019, Klobuchar and Marco Rubio unveiled the Supporting Veterans in STEM Careers Act, a bill aimed at assisting veterans who are going back into the workforce through directing the National Science Foundation to advocate for veterans to study and pursue careers in Science, Technology, Engineering, and Math (STEM). The bill also mandated the Office of Science and Technology Policy (OSTP) create a working group that would organize programs of the federal government to help with transitioning and training of veterans for STEM careers. The bill unanimously cleared the Commerce, Science, and Transportation Committee in July 2019. Klobuchar stated that she was satisfied by the bill passing in the committee as it would allow them to "help support veterans in their transition to civilian life– benefiting veterans, their families, communities, and our whole economy."

In March 2019, Klobuchar and Republican Thom Tillis introduced the Newborn Care Improvement Act, a bill that if enacted would double the number of days from seven to fourteen that veterans receive to care for their newborns as present law did not allow the baby health insurance if the parent was unable to find outside care after the first week. Klobuchar stated the sacrifices made by service members and that the bill "will help provide men and women in the military with the resources they need to start a happy, healthy family."

== Technology ==
=== Cyber bullying ===
Klobuchar was one of 14 co-sponsors, led by Senate Majority Whip John Cornyn, of the PROTECT Our Children Act of 2017. The law added additional online protections aimed at children to those provided by the PROTECT Our Children Act of 2008 (which had 60 cosponsors, including Klobuchar, and was sponsored by Joe Biden). She also co-sponsored the KIDS Act of 2008, which adds protections against online sexual predators who target children, alongside 20 other senators led by Chuck Schumer.

=== Data privacy ===
In June 2019, Klobuchar and Republican Lisa Murkowski introduced the Protecting Personal Health Data Act, legislation mandating the United States Secretary of Health and Human Services create regulations for apps that track health data, wearable devices, and genetic testing kits in addition to forming a National Task Force on Health Data Protection that would evaluate and give a position on potential cybersecurity and privacy risks related to consumer products using customer health data. In a statement, Klobuchar said new technology had "made it easier for people to monitor their own health, but health tracking apps and home DNA testing kits have also given companies access to personal, private data with limited oversight."

In October 2018, Klobuchar and Catherine Cortez Masto sent a letter to Google CEO Sundar Pichai charging Google with failing "[to] protect consumers’ data" while keeping "consumers in the dark about serious security risks" and noting that Google had not found evidence of developers taking advantage of this vulnerability or that profile data was misused. Klobuchar and Mastro expressed their dismay "that more care was not taken to inform consumers about threats to their personal information."

=== Net neutrality ===
In December 2017, in response to the Federal Communications Commission's repeal of net neutrality rules, Klobuchar said, "It’s against the concept of the internet, which was all about letting everyone access the internet and letting everyone be able to compete on an equal playing field."

In February 2018, during a discussion with Mayor of Duluth Emily Larson, Klobuchar stated that net neutrality "is not just about one company having access, it's about everyone having equal access" and they "want small- and mid-size cities like Duluth to be able to compete against metro areas where they might be able to have the benefits of being bigger."

In April 2018, Klobuchar, fellow Minnesota senator Tina Smith, and Ed Markey met with local business owners, experts and advocates to discuss the Congressional Review Act resolution and its potential to overturn the FCC's net neutrality repeal. Klobuchar said that Senate approval of the resolution would give it momentum to get passed in the House.

In May 2018, Klobuchar voted for a bill that would reinstate net neutrality rules and thereby overturn the FCC's repeal via a law authorizing Congress to reverse regulatory actions by a simple majority vote.

=== Telecommunications ===
In April 2019, Klobuchar, Tina Smith, and Patty Murray introduced the Digital Equity Act of 2019, legislation establishing a $120 million grant program that would fund both the creation and implementation of "comprehensive digital equity plans" in each U.S. state along with providing a $120 million grant program to give support toward projects developed by individuals and groups. The bill also gave the National Telecommunications and Information Administration (NTIA) the role of evaluating and providing guidance toward digital equity projects. Klobuchar argued that the bill would provide communities across the US with high-speed internet.
