= Patricia Lantz =

American politician

Member of the Washington House of Representatives from the 26th district
- In office January 13, 1997 – January 12, 2009
- Preceded by: Lois McMahan
- Succeeded by: Jan Angel

Personal details
- Born: February 7, 1938 (age 88) Auburn, Washington, U.S.
- Party: Democratic
- Spouse: John
- Education: Stanford University (BA in international relations), University of Puget Sound School of Law (JD)
- Occupation: attorney

Patricia T. Lantz (born February 7, 1938) is a former American politician from Washington. Lantz is former Democratic member of the Washington House of Representatives from January 1997 to January 2009, representing the 26th district. She served as Chair of the House Judiciary Committee. She did not seek re-election in 2008 and was succeeded by Jan Angel, a Republican.
