= Ron Meyers (politician) =

American politician from Washington

Speaker pro tempore of the Washington House of Representatives
- In office January 11, 1993 – January 9, 1995
- Preceded by: John L. O'Brien
- Succeeded by: Jim Horn

Member of the Washington House of Representatives from the 26th district
- In office January 12, 1987 – January 9, 1995
- Preceded by: Linda Craig Thomas
- Succeeded by: Lois McMahan

Personal details
- Born: November 22, 1950 (age 75) Tacoma, Washington, United States
- Party: Democratic
- Spouse: Donna Lee
- Education: Central Washington University (BA); Seattle Law School (JD)
- Occupation: Attorney

Ron Meyers (born November 22, 1950) is an American lawyer and politician in the state of Washington. He served in the Washington House of Representatives from 1987 to 1995 as a Democrat. Born in Tacoma, he attended Central Washington University and the University of Puget Sound School of Law and is a lawyer. Following his time in the Legislature, He started a Law Firm in Lacey, Washington called "Ron Meyers and Associates".
