= Larry Seaquist =

American politician

Member of the Washington House of Representatives from the 26th district
- In office January 8, 2007 – January 12, 2015
- Preceded by: Derek Kilmer
- Succeeded by: Michelle Caldier

Personal details
- Born: July 9, 1938 (age 88) Idaho Falls, Idaho, U.S.
- Party: Democratic
- Spouse: Carla Seaquist
- Education: Oregon State University (BS)

Military service
- Allegiance: United States
- Branch/service: United States Navy
- Rank: Captain
- Unit: USS Iowa (BB-61)

Larry R. Seaquist (born September 7, 1938) is an American politician, retired Navy captain, and academic who served as a member of the Washington House of Representatives from 2007 to 2015. He ran for Pierce County executive in 2020 and lost to incumbent Republican Bruce Dammeier by ten percentage points.

== Early life and education ==
Seaquist was born September 7, 1938, In Idaho Falls, Idaho, the first of five children of Dorothy to Roger Seaquist, Seaquist lived on the family farm and attended Ammon Elementary School in Ammon, Idaho. After sharecropping on several farms in the area, his parent scraped together the down payment for a 100-acre farm outside Vale, Oregon. Graduating as class valedictorian from Vale High School in 1956, Seaquist attended Oregon State University in Corvallis, Oregon, studying physics and meteorology. Seaquist dropped out of college in his junior year, working for a few months as a firefighter and ambulance driver for the Corvallis Fire Department. Seaquist later earned his Bachelor of Arts degree from Oregon State in 1963.

== Career ==
=== Arctic and Antarctic service ===
Hired by the National Weather Service, Seaquist began on his 21st birthday a year-long assignment as a weather observer at the Barter Island radar site of the Distant Early Warning Line. Living beside the indigenous village of Kaktovic, Alaska, Seaquist becoming a specialist in flying twice-daily radiosonde balloon probes of the atmosphere and reporting on ice and weather conditions. He volunteered to follow that year in the Arctic with another in the Antarctic, this time as an American rep to the Argentine Antarctica deployment at Ellsworth Station where he again flew radiosondes for upper atmosphere measurements and made ices measurements as part of the global weather tracking system. That year extended to 14 months when the Argentine icebreaker, General San Martine, stuck in the ice in the Wendell Sea, was unable to resupply the station on time. Seaquist then flew on Argentina's first flight to the South Pole, returned home via the U.S. base at McMurdo, and returned to school.

=== Military ===
Seaquist served in the United States Navy from 1962 to 1994. He worked at the Pentagon and retired after serving as the captain of the USS Iowa (BB-61). He commanded the Iowa from 25 April 1986 through 26 May 1988. He was renowned on USS Iowa at choosing an enlisted crew member each day, telling them to be on the bridge at 1800 hours and have a song ready which the crew member had to create. At 1800 hours, the Captain would announce "I'd like to introduce you to today's singing boatswain mate", at which time the crew member had to sing over the ships 1MC announcement system to the entire crew. He served as a technical adviser for the 2001 film A Glimpse of Hell.

=== Politics ===
In 2007, Seaquist was elected to the Washington House of Representatives, representing Washington's 26th legislative district, which covers the Kitsap Peninsula from Bremerton and Port Orchard in the north to Gig Harbor in the south. In 2014, Seaquist lost his seat in a heated election to Michelle Caldier.

=== Later career ===
Since leaving the Washington House of Representatives, Seaquist has worked as a Political Science professor at the Evergreen State College, and speaks as an expert on national security and military issues.

== Additional sources ==
- Thompson, Charles C. (1999). A Glimpse of Hell: The Explosion on the USS Iowa and Its Cover-Up. W.W. Norton. ISBN 0393047148.
