= John L. O'Brien =

American politician (1911–2007)

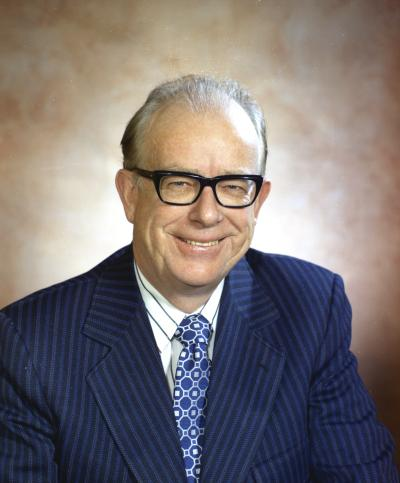
- O'Brien in 1973

31st and 38th Speaker of the Washington House of Representatives
- In office January 22, 1976 – January 10, 1977; Acting
- Preceded by: Leonard A. Sawyer
- Succeeded by: John A. Bagnariol
- In office January 10, 1955 – January 14, 1963
- Preceded by: R. Mort Frayn
- Succeeded by: William S. Day

Speaker pro tempore of the Washington House of Representatives
- In office January 10, 1983 – January 11, 1993
- Preceded by: Otto Amen
- Succeeded by: Ron Meyers
- In office January 8, 1973 – January 12, 1981 Serving with Otto Amen (1979–1981)
- Preceded by: Tom Copeland
- Succeeded by: Otto Amen

Majority Leader of the Washington House of Representatives
- In office January 14, 1963 – January 9, 1967
- Preceded by: August P. Mardesich
- Succeeded by: Slade Gorton

Minority Leader of the Washington House of Representatives
- In office January 9, 1967 – January 11, 1971
- Preceded by: Tom Copeland
- Succeeded by: Leonard A. Sawyer

Member of the Washington House of Representatives
- In office January 10, 1983 – January 11, 1993
- Preceded by: John Eng
- Succeeded by: Jesse Wineberry
- Constituency: 37th
- In office January 8, 1973 – January 10, 1983
- Preceded by: John A. Bagnariol
- Succeeded by: Doug Sayan
- Constituency: 35th
- In office January 10, 1949 – January 8, 1973
- Preceded by: H. C. Armstrong
- Succeeded by: John E. Cunningham
- Constituency: 33rd
- In office October 1, 1939 – January 13, 1947
- Preceded by: Harry D. Austin
- Succeeded by: H. C. Armstrong
- Constituency: 33rd

Personal details
- Born: John Lawrence O'Brien; November 22, 1911 Seattle, Washington, U.S.
- Died: April 22, 2007 (aged 95) Seattle, Washington, U.S.
- Party: Democratic
- Spouse: Mary Schwarz
- Children: 6
- Education: Saint Martin's University (BA)
- Occupation: Accountant

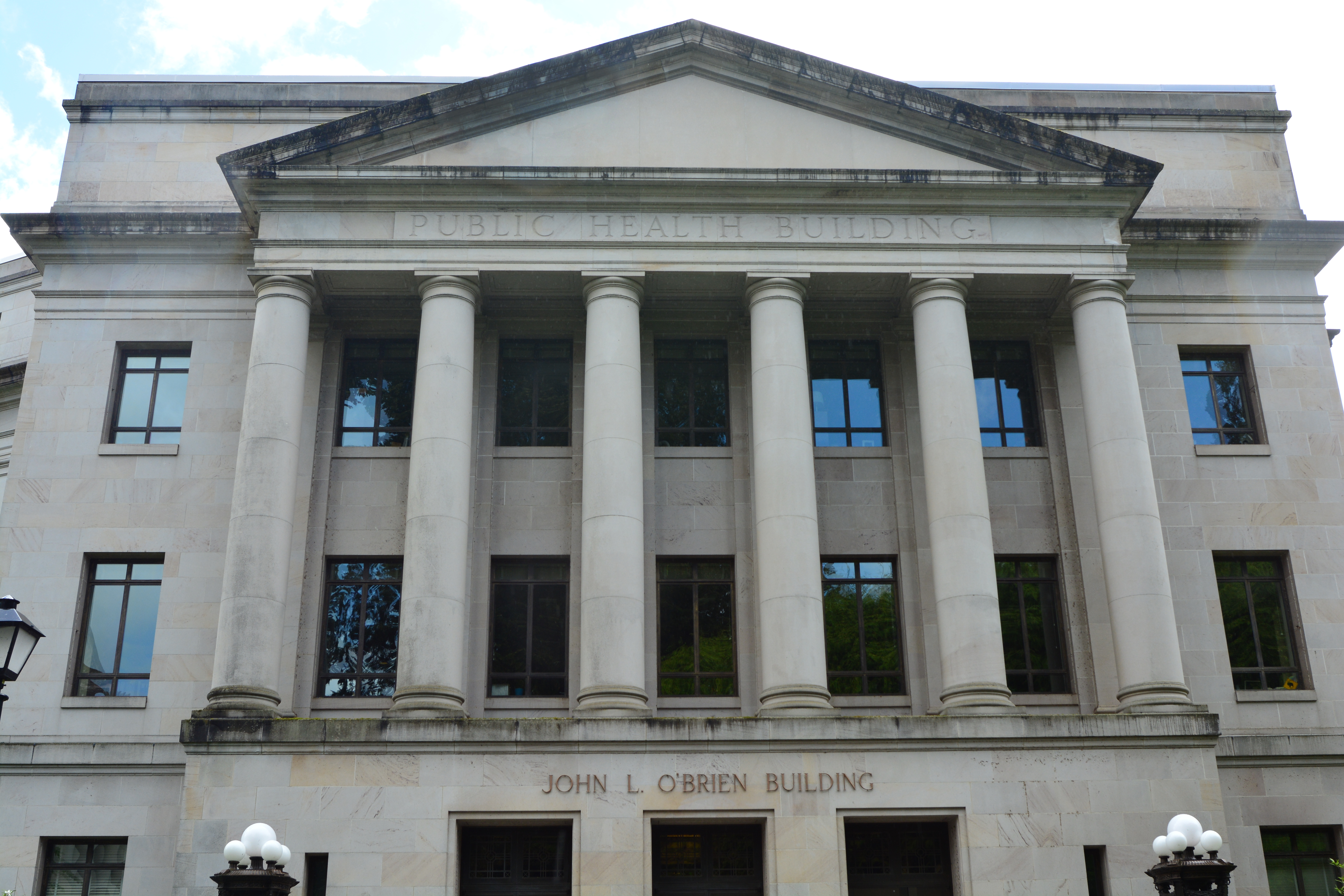
The former Public Health Building at the Washington State Capitol was renamed the John L. O'Brien Building on March 17, 1989, and now houses House of Representatives offices.

John Lawrence O'Brien (November 22, 1911 – April 22, 2007) was an American accountant and politician in the state of Washington. He served in the Washington House of Representatives from 1939 to 1947 and from 1949 to 1993.
