= Thomas A. Swayze Jr. =

American politician

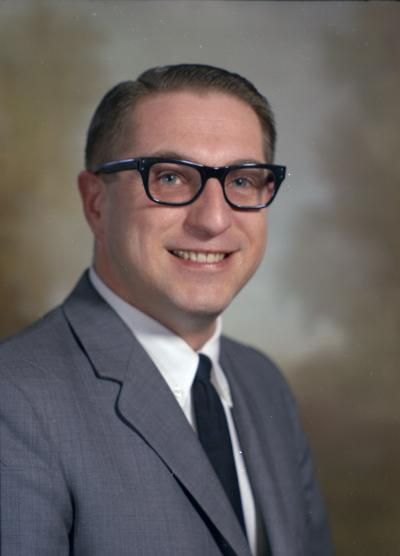
- Swayze in 1967

36th Speaker of the Washington House of Representatives
- In office January 11, 1971 – January 8, 1973
- Preceded by: Tom Copeland
- Succeeded by: Leonard A. Sawyer

Minority Leader of the Washington House of Representatives
- In office January 8, 1973 – January 13, 1975
- Preceded by: Leonard A. Sawyer
- Succeeded by: Irv Newhouse

Member of the Washington House of Representatives from the 26th district
- In office October 5, 1965 – December 31, 1973
- Preceded by: Frances Swayze
- Succeeded by: John A. Honan

Personal details
- Born: Thomas Allen Swayze Jr. December 8, 1930 Tacoma, Washington, U.S.
- Died: October 16, 2005 (aged 74) Tacoma, Washington, U.S.
- Party: Republican
- Relations: Frances Swayze (mother)

Thomas Allen Swayze Jr. (December 8, 1930 – October 16, 2005) was an American politician in the state of Washington. He served in the Washington House of Representatives from 1965 to 1973 for the 26th district.

== Early life ==
Swayze was born on December 8, 1930, in Tacoma, Washington. His father was Thomas Allen Swayze, comptroller for the city of Tacoma, and his mother was Frances Swayze, a member of the Washington House of Representatives. His sister, Gretchen Wilbert became the mayor of Gig Harbor. He attended local public school before receiving his bachelor's degree from the University of Puget Sound and his bachelors of law degree from the University of Washington in 1954. He worked for one year as an assistant state attorney general and joined the U.S. Army for two years before joining a private legal practice in Tacoma.

== Political career ==
He was a member of the Young Republicans and he was the chair of the Pierce County GOP Central Committee between 1964 and 1965. He was appointed to the Washington House of Representatives in 1965 to take over his mother's seat for the 26th district. He was the chair of the committee on state government between 1969 and 1970. Swayze won the election to become Speaker of the House in 1971, beating incumbent Thomas L. Copeland, a position that he held until the Republicans lost the house in 1973 and he became the minority leader. While serving as speaker, he represented the party during redistricting negotiations in 1972.

Swayze resigned from the legislature in 1973 and returned to private practice. In 1975, he was appointed to the Pierce County Trial Court of General Jurisdiction, where he served until 1996.

== Personal life ==
Swayze was married to his wife, Marliss, and the couple had four children. He died on October 16, 2005, at the age of 74 from leukemia.
