= United States House Administration Subcommittee on Modernization =

United States Congress select committee established in 2019

Subcommittee of Committee on House Administration
- Active United States House of Representatives; 119th Congress

Leadership
- Chair: Stephanie Bice (R)
- Ranking Member: Norma Torres (D)

Structure
- Seats: 4 (4 currently filled) 2/2 2/2
- Political parties: Majority (2): Republican (2); Minority (2): Democratic (2)

Meeting place
- 1309, Longworth House Office Building; Washington, D.C. 20515

Phone number
- (202)-225-8281

The House Administration Subcommittee on Modernization and Innovation (ModSub) is a subcommittee of the Committee on House Administration in the US House of Representatives.

== Jurisdiction ==
Matters relating to modernization of the House of Representatives and the Legislative Branch, oversight of implementation of modernization initiatives, evaluation and advancement of new and emerging innovations to ensure that congressional modernization efforts are ongoing, and such other matters as may be referred to the subcommittee.

== History ==
The subcommittee is the successor to the House Select Committee on the Modernization of Congress, a select committee that was established by H.Res. 6 on January 4, 2019, and was tasked to investigate, study, make findings, hold public hearings, and develop recommendations to make Congress more effective, efficient, and transparent. The Select Committee was a bipartisan committee, with an equal number of Republican and Democratic members. The Committee on House Administration, which had been charged with implementing most recommendations from the Select Committee, established the Subcommittee on Modernization in the 118th Congress to continue the Select Committee’s work and to implement recommendations. While the subcommittee continues to follow most of the practices of its predecessor, including even, bipartisan membership, the subcommittee was granted legislative jurisdiction by the Rules of the Committee on House Administration.

H.Res. 6, which was introduced by Rep. Steny Hoyer, was approved by an overwhelming majority of 418–12. Following the installation of the inaugural 12 members, interest was expressed from the left-leaning Demand Progress, the Republican-aligned Congressional Institute and the nonaligned Bipartisan Policy Center. For its part, Roll Call commented that:

The committee offers evidence of lawmakers’ own angst with the legislative body’s waning power and dwindling resources. It also highlights concerns on and off Capitol Hill about the revolving door between Congress and K Street, where, because of high turnover, lobbyists often wield more institutional knowledge and policy gravitas than congressional aides.

— Kate Ackley, Roll Call

The Select Committee, was originally set to expire in February 2020; however, the House voted on November 14, 2019, to extend the committee's work to the end of the 116th Congress. On January 4, 2021, the House once again officially reauthorized the Select Committee for the 117th Congress.

Although the Select Committee did not have legislative jurisdiction, it has regularly released recommendations to the House. On December 10, 2019, the Select Committee members introduced H.Res.756 which incorporates 29 of the recommendations passed by the Select Committee to improve transparency, accessibility and communication throughout the House. The resolution was passed with a 395–13 vote.

== Members, 119th Congress, House Administration Subcommittee on Modernization and Innovation ==
Majority	Minority
Stephanie Bice, Oklahoma, Chairwoman; Mike Carey, Ohio	Norma Torres, California, Ranking Member; Joseph Morelle, New York

== Historical committee rosters ==
=== 118th Congress, House Administration Subcommittee on Modernization ===
Majority	Minority
Stephanie Bice, Oklahoma, Chairwoman; Mike Carey, Ohio	Derek Kilmer, Washington, Ranking Member; Joseph Morelle, New York

=== 117th Congress, House Select Committee on the Modernization of Congress ===
Majority	Minority
Derek Kilmer, Washington, Chair; Emanuel Cleaver, Missouri; Zoe Lofgren, California; Ed Perlmutter, Colorado; Dean Phillips, Minnesota; Nikema Williams, Georgia	William Timmons, South Carolina, Vice-Chair; Rodney Davis, Illinois; Bob Latta, Ohio; Guy Reschenthaler, Pennsylvania; Beth Van Duyne, Texas; Dave Joyce, Ohio

=== 116th Congress, House Select Committee on the Modernization of Congress ===
Majority	Minority
Derek Kilmer, Washington, Chair; Emanuel Cleaver, Missouri; Zoe Lofgren, California; Suzan DelBene, Washington; Mark Pocan, Wisconsin; Mary Gay Scanlon, Pennsylvania	Tom Graves, Georgia, Vice-Chair; Rodney Davis, Illinois; Rob Woodall, Georgia; Susan Brooks, Indiana; Dan Newhouse, Washington; William Timmons, South Carolina
