= Tom Copeland =

American politician (1924–2025)

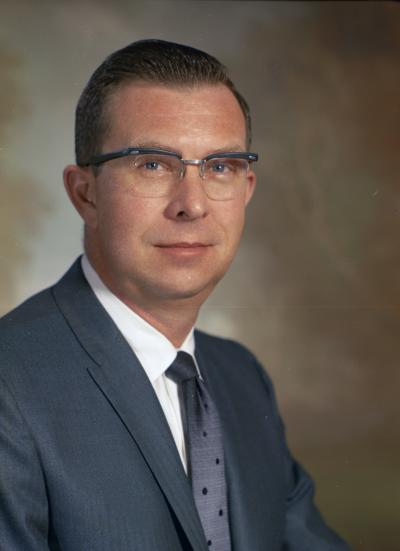
- Copeland in 1967

35th Speaker of the Washington House of Representatives Acting
- In office March 12, 1970 – January 11, 1971
- Preceded by: Don Eldridge
- Succeeded by: Thomas A. Swayze Jr.

Speaker pro tempore of the Washington House of Representatives
- In office January 9, 1967 – January 8, 1973
- Preceded by: Avery Garrett
- Succeeded by: John L. O'Brien

Minority Leader of the Washington House of Representatives
- In office January 11, 1965 – January 9, 1967
- Preceded by: Daniel J. Evans
- Succeeded by: John L. O'Brien

Member of the Washington House of Representatives from the 11th district
- In office January 14, 1957 – January 8, 1973
- Preceded by: Lester L. Robison
- Succeeded by: A. N. “Bud” Shinpoch

Personal details
- Born: April 17, 1924 Pendleton, Oregon, U.S.
- Died: December 8, 2025 (aged 101)
- Party: Republican
- Spouse(s): Dolly Doble (died 1970) Donna Edwards (m. 1973)
- Children: 3
- Education: Washington State University

Thomas Lenox Copeland (April 17, 1924 – December 8, 2025) was an American politician from Washington.

== Life and career ==
Copeland was born in Pendleton, Oregon on April 17, 1924, to Edwin and Delia Copeland. He served in the United States Army during World War II, serving in Europe as a tank destroyer commander. After the conclusion of the war, he stayed with the Army as an administrator and was eventually promoted to captain. He was an alumnus of Washington State University, where he majored in agricultural engineering.

He was elected to the Washington House of Representatives in 1957, for District 11, which encompassed the counties of Asotin, Columbia, Garfield and parts of Walla Walla. He was a Republican. He served until 1972; during his time he served stints as Whip (1961, 1963), Minority Leader (1965), and Speaker pro tempore (1967–1972). In 1972, he retired to run for the Washington State Senate, however he was unsuccessful in his election, later opting to retire from politics.

Copeland was married to Dolly Doble, whom he met at college, until her death in 1970. They had three children. In 1973, he married Donna Edwards; the couple lived in Arizona. He turned 100 in April 2024, and died on December 8, 2025, at the age of 101.
