= Carolyn Powers =

American politician (1925–2024)

Member of the Washington House of Representatives for the 26th district
- In office 1983–1985
- Succeeded by: Linda Craig Thomas

Personal details
- Born: September 25, 1925 Fort Barrancas, Florida, U.S.
- Died: February 1, 2024 (aged 98) Port Orchard, Washington, U.S.
- Party: Democratic
- Spouse: Paul D. Powers

Carolyn Powers (September 25, 1925 – February 1, 2024) was an American politician in the state of Washington. She served the 26th district from 1979 to 1983. She also served on the Port Orchard, Washington council from 1987 to 2013. Her husband, Paul D. Powers was mayor of Port Orchard from 1972 to 1982.

Born Carolyn Snitman in Fort Barrancas, Florida, she married Paul D. Powers on May 18, 1946, in Mobile, Alabama. She died in Port Orchard on February 1, 2024, at the age of 98.
