= Lois McMahan =

American educator and politician from Washington

Member of the Washington House of Representatives from the 26th district
- In office January 13, 2003 – January 10, 2005
- Preceded by: Brock Jackley
- Succeeded by: Derek Kilmer
- In office January 9, 1995 – January 13, 1997
- Preceded by: Ron Meyers
- Succeeded by: Patricia Lantz

Personal details
- Born: Lois Grace Norbo; May 14, 1942 Culdesac, Idaho, U.S.
- Died: August 6, 2019 (aged 77) Gig Harbor, Washington, U.S.
- Party: Republican
- Spouse: Jerry McMahan
- Children: 5
- Occupation: Teacher, Politician

Lois Grace McMahan (née Norbo; May 14, 1942 – August 6, 2019) was an American educator and politician from Washington. McMahan was a former Republican member of Washington House of Representatives for District 26, from 1995 to 1997 and again from 2003 to 2005.

== Early life ==
On May 14, 1942, McMahan was born in Culdesac, Idaho.

== Education ==
In 1963, McMahan earned a Bachelor of Arts degree and a Teaching Certificate from Prairie College.

== Career ==
In 1963, McMahan became an elementary school teacher, until 1969.

On November 8, 1994, McMahan won the election and became a Republican member of Washington House of Representatives for District 26, Position 1. McMahan defeated Ron Meyers with 53.93% of the votes. On November 5, 2002, McMahan won the election and became a Republican member of Washington House of Representatives for District 26, Position 2. McMahan defeated Brock Jackley with 50.64% of the votes.

== Personal life ==
McMahan's husband was Jerry McMahan. They had five children. McMahan and her family lived in Olalla, Washington.
