= 2020 Pierce County Executive election =

- November 3, 2020
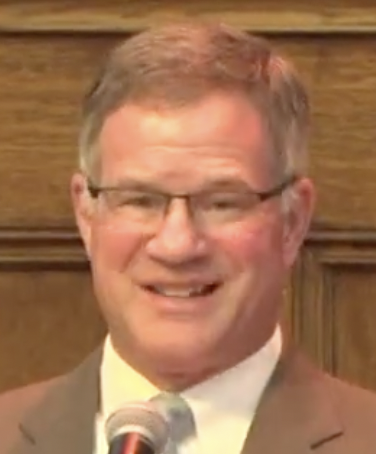

| Nominee | Bruce Dammeier | Larry Seaquist |
| Party | Republican | Democratic |
| Popular vote | 241,062 | 198,245 |
| Percentage | 54.81% | 45.08% |
County Executive before election
Bruce Dammeier
Republican
Elected County Executive
Bruce Dammeier
Republican

The 2020 Pierce County Executive election took place on November 3, 2020, to elect the county executive of Pierce County, Washington. Incumbent Republican County Executive Bruce Dammeier ran for re-election to a second term. He was challenged by former Democratic State Representative Larry Seaquist.

The election took place in the aftermath of the George Floyd protests, and Dammeier attacked Seaquist for allegedly wanting to "defund the police." The News Tribune endorsed Dammeier for re-election, praising him as an "approachable negotiator and savvy deal-maker," though it noted some "disappointing lapses of judgment." The paper praised Seaquist as "a salt-of-the-earth Democrat who, like Dammeier, launched a distinguished public service career in the Navy," but noted that he was "running a campaign largely centered on Trump administration divisiveness and dysfunction," and that "his big-picture thinking doesn't translate as well to immediate policy proposals."

In the primary election, Dammeier placed first over Seaquist by a wide margin, winning 56 percent of the vote to his 44 percent. Dammeier ultimately defeated Seaquist in the general election, winning 55 percent of the vote.

== Primary election ==
=== Candidates ===
- Bruce Dammeier, incumbent County Executive (Republican)
- Larry Seaquist, former State Representative (Democratic)

=== Results ===
Primary election results
| Party | Candidate | Votes | % |
|---|---|---|---|
| Republican | Bruce Dammeier (inc.) | 148,902 | 56.19% |
| Democratic | Larry Seaquist | 115,773 | 43.69% |
| Write-in | | 331 | 0.12% |
| Total votes | | 265,006 | 100.00% |

== General election ==
=== Results ===
2020 Pierce County Executive election
| Party | Candidate | Votes | % |
|---|---|---|---|
| Republican | Bruce Dammeier (inc.) | 241,062 | 54.81% |
| Democratic | Larry Seaquist | 198,245 | 45.08% |
| Write-in | | 478 | 0.11% |
| Total votes | | 439,785 | 100.00% |
| Republican hold | | | |
