= Tom Huff (politician) =

American politician from Washington

Tom G. Huff

Member of the Washington House of Representatives from the 26th district
- In office January 9, 1995 – January 8, 2001
- Preceded by: Wes Pruitt
- Succeeded by: Brock Jackley

Personal details
- Born: Thomas Gregory Huff; September 27, 1932 Mandan, North Dakota, U.S.
- Died: April 14, 2013 (aged 80) Gig Harbor, Washington, U.S.
- Party: Republican

Thomas Gregory Huff (September 27, 1932 – April 14, 2013) was an American businessman and politician who served as a member of the Washington House of Representatives, representing the 26th district from 1995 to 2001.

== Biography ==
Born and raised in Mandan, North Dakota, Huff attended local public schools and graduated from Sumner High School. He attended college at the University of Puget Sound and Knapp College.

Huff made a business career in Washington State, where he became an executive for Sears, a major retailer and catalog company. He became interested in politics, joining the Republican Party. Elected in 1994 to the Washington House of Representatives, he served from 1995 to 2000 representing Gig Harbor.
