= Frances Swayze =

American politician

Member of the Washington House of Representatives for the 26th district
- In office 1953–1966

Personal details
- Born: February 11, 1904 Council Bluffs, Iowa, United States
- Died: January 1, 1994 (aged 92) Gig Harbor, Washington, United States
- Party: Republican
- Spouse(s): Thomas A. Swayze, Sr.
- Children: Thomas A. Swayze, Jr.

Frances Goerhing Swayze (February 11, 1901 – January 1, 1994) was an American politician from the state of Washington. She served in the Washington House of Representatives from 1953 to 1966 for District 26.
