= Micheal R. Williams =

American politician

Member of the Tennessee Senate
- In office January 14, 1997 – January 13, 2009
- Preceded by: Danny Wallace
- Succeeded by: Mike Faulk
- Constituency: 2nd district (1997-2003); 4th district (2003-2009)

Member of the Tennessee House of Representatives from the 34th district
- In office January 8, 1991 – January 14, 1997
- Preceded by: Thomas Wheeler
- Succeeded by: Mark Goins

Personal details
- Born: February 6, 1955 (age 71) Knoxville, Tennessee, U.S.
- Party: Independent
- Other political affiliations: Republican (until 2007)
- Education: Lincoln Memorial University (BA)
- Website: House website Senate website

Micheal R. Williams (born February 6, 1955, in Knoxville, Tennessee) is a Tennessee politician who formerly served in the Tennessee State Senate and was elected county mayor of Union County in August 2010.

A resident of Maynardville, in the Tennessee State Senate Williams represented the 4th district, which encompasses Claiborne, Grainger, Hancock, Hawkins, Jefferson, and Union counties.

He attended Lincoln Memorial University and obtained a B.A. in Health and Physical Education in 1985. He currently works in antique automobile restoration.

Williams was first elected to the 97th General Assembly as a member of the Tennessee House of Representatives. He served as a state senator since being elected to the 100th General Assembly as a member of the Republican Party.

Williams was Speaker pro Tempore of the Tennessee Senate during the 104th General Assembly (2005–2006). During the 100th General Assembly, he was the Senate Republican Whip, and he was the Senate Republican Assistant floor leader during the 101st General Assembly. He serves on the Senate Finance, Ways, and Means Committee, the Senate Commerce, Labor, and Agriculture Committee, and the Senate Rules Committee.

On March 14, 2007, he announced that he was leaving the Senate Republican Caucus and becoming an independent. This left the Senate evenly divided, with 16 Democrats, 16 Republicans, and one Independent. In explaining his move, Williams said: "Some in the [Republican] party are leading us down a path of bitterness and divisiveness and, in doing so, they have left me. I have not left them." Senate leaders from both parties said Williams' move would make little difference because, as Senate Democratic Leader Jim Kyle stated, "Mike Williams has never been a guaranteed vote for anyone." Williams said he had not decided whether to seek re-election in 2008. The district he represents is generally regarded as strongly Republican, but Williams said he believes voters appreciate independence. "The largest voting bloc in the state of Tennessee is Independents," he said. "They're just not organized."

In the 2007-2008 edition of the Tennessee Blue Book, Williams listed his party affiliation as "Independent NASCAR Fan." In 2008 he ran for re-election to the State Senate as an independent candidate, narrowly losing to Church Hill attorney Mike Faulk, a Republican, by a vote of 29,417 to 29,171.

Williams won election to the office of county mayor in Union County on August 5, 2010, receiving 52.2% of the vote and defeating incumbent Larry Lay.
