= Nathan Schlicher =

American politician from Washington

Nathaniel R. Schlicher

Member of the Washington Senate from the 26th district
- In office January 17, 2013 – December 17, 2013
- Preceded by: Derek Kilmer
- Succeeded by: Jan Angel

Personal details
- Born: November 10, 1982 (age 43) Bremerton, Washington, U.S.
- Party: Democratic
- Spouse: Jessica C. Schlicher
- Children: David, Juliette, Henry
- Education: Pacific Lutheran University; University of Washington; Western Governor's University
- Profession: Physician; Attorney
- Website: Senatorial website Campaign website

Nathaniel R. Schlicher (born November 10, 1982) is an American Democratic Party politician. He was a member of the Washington State Senate representing the 26th district for exactly eleven months, from January to December 2013. Schlicher was appointed to fill the Senate seat on January 17, 2013, following Derek Kilmer's election as the congressman for Washington's 6th congressional district. Schlicher ran in a special election on November 5, 2013, to complete the remainder of his term as state senator. Schlicher conceded the race on November 7 to his challenger, Republican state representative Jan Angel, who was certified the winner on December 4 and sworn in on December 17.

== Biography ==
Schlicher was born and raised in Bremerton, Washington. His mother was a nurse and his father retired as a hospital administrator. As an undergraduate, Schlicher studied political science and biology at Pacific Lutheran University. He then earned a J.D. degree followed by an M.D. degree at the University of Washington. Nathan specialized in health policy law in medical school, and distinguished himself in medical school working in rural, underserved areas of Alaska through the University of Washington's WRITE program. He is board certified in Emergency Medicine and practices at St. Josephs' Medical Center in Tacoma.

Schlicher currently works in the Emergency Department at St. Joseph Medical Center, caring for thousands of our neighbors every year. He was served as the associate director for the TeamHealth National Patient Safety Organization, responsible for patient safety across this national organization and now as the Associate Director of Litigation Support. He served as an attorney of counsel at Johnson, Graffe, Keay, Moniz, & Wick, LLP previously. He lives in Gig Harbor, Washington, with his wife and children.

Nathan is credited with leading the State of Washington in Medicaid reforms that have saved taxpayers $32 million per year, reducing prescription drug abuse, helping patients find medical homes, and reducing ER use for non-emergency conditions. While in the Senate, Nathan voted for a balanced budget and achieved increased funding for schools in a tax-neutral package that was approved by the majority of both Republicans and Democrats in the Senate.
