= John Eng =

American politician

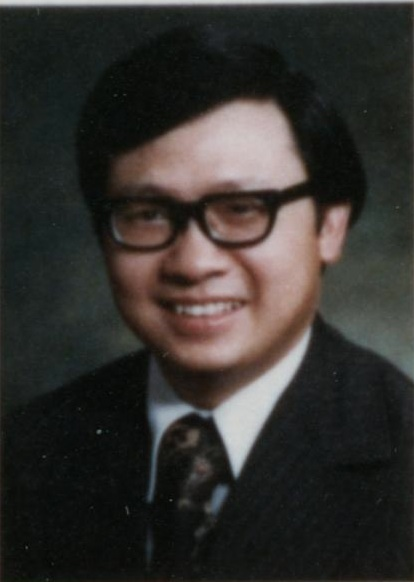
- Eng in 1977

Member of the Washington House of Representatives from the 37th district
- In office January 8, 1973 – January 10, 1983
- Preceded by: Michael K. Ross
- Succeeded by: John L. O'Brien

Personal details
- Born: 1942 (age 83–84) Hong Kong
- Party: Democratic

John Eng (born 1942) is an American former politician in the state of Washington. He served the 37th district from 1973 to 1983. Eng was the first Asian American elected to the Washington state legislature. Eng graduated from the University of Washington with a degree in Business Administration and was a Peace Corps volunteer.
