= Linda Craig Thomas =

Washington State politician

Member of the Washington House of Representatives from the 26th district
- In office January 14, 1985 – January 12, 1987
- Preceded by: Carolyn Powers
- Succeeded by: Ron Meyers

Personal details
- Party: Republican
- Occupation: Business owner; teacher; author

Linda Craig Thomas is a former American politician who served as a member of the Washington House of Representatives from 1985 to 1987. She represented Washington's 26th legislative district as a Republican.
