= Ryan Mello =

American politician (born 1978/79)

Ryan N. Mello

7th Pierce County Executive
- Incumbent
- Assumed office January 1, 2025
- Preceded by: Bruce Dammeier

Member of the Pierce County Council from the 4th District
- In office January 1, 2021 – January 1, 2025
- Preceded by: Connie Ladenburg
- Succeeded by: Rosie Ayala

Personal details
- Born: 1978 or 1979 (age 46–47) Kailua, Hawaii, U.S.
- Party: Democratic
- Domestic partner: Sean
- Education: University of Puget Sound (B.A.)

Ryan Mello is a Democratic politician from Tacoma, Washington, who currently serves as the Pierce County Executive. Mello was elected as County Executive in 2024, and previously served as a member of the County Council and the Tacoma City Council.

== Early life ==
Mello was born in Kailua, Hawaii, and moved to Washington in 1997 to attend the University of Puget Sound. He served as the President of the Associated Students of the University of Puget Sound, the university's student government association, from 2000 to 2001, and graduated in 2001 with his bachelor of arts degree in politics and government.

After graduation, Mello joined AmeriCorps and worked for the United Way of Pierce County from 2001 to 2003, and worked as a staffer to Democratic State Representative Hans Dunshee.

== Political career ==
In 2005, Mello ran for a position on the Metropolitan Park District of Tacoma. He defeated incumbent Commissioner Jerry Thorpe, winning 55–44 percent. He became the Pierce County Director of the Cascade Land Conservancy in 2006, and spearheaded an effort to preserve open spaces in the county by purchasing the development rights on family-owned tree farms.

Mello applied for a vacant position on the Tacoma City Council in 2010. He was appointed by the City Council to the Position 7 seat on January 14, 2010. He was elected to a full term in 2011, defeating perennial candidate Will Baker with 74 percent of the vote. He was re-elected in 2015, and barred from seeking another term in 2019 because of term limits.

In 2020, Mello ran for the Pierce County Council from District 4. In the primary election, he placed first, receiving 30 percent of the vote, and advancing to a runoff election with University Place City Councilman Javier Figueroa. Mello defeated Figueroa in a landslide in the general election, receiving 63 percent of the vote.

== Pierce County Executive ==
Mello announced in 2023 that he would run for Pierce County Executive in 2024 to succeed term-limited Republican incumbent Bruce Dammeier. He was the only Democratic candidate to run, and faced Republican State Representative Kelly Chambers. In the primary election, Mello placed first with 52 percent of the vote, and narrowly defeated Chambers in the general election, winning 51 percent of the vote to her 49 percent.

== Personal life ==
Mello is openly gay, and came out when attending college at the University of Puget Sound. He and his partner, Sean, live in the Theater District of Tacoma.
