= Honest Ads Act =

2017 proposed United States Senate bill

- Long title: A bill to enhance transparency and accountability for online political advertisements by requiring those who purchase and publish such ads to disclose information about the advertisements to the public, and for other purposes.

Legislative history
- Introduced in the Senate by Mark Warner (D-VA), Amy Klobuchar (D-MN), John McCain (R-AZ) on October 19, 2017; Committee consideration by Senate Rules and Administration

The Honest Ads Act (S. 1989, H.R. 4077) was a bill in the United States Senate intended to regulate online campaign advertisements by companies. The bill was proposed on October 19, 2017, as a response to Facebook's disclosure of Russia purchasing political ads during the 2016 United States presidential election. The Honest Ads Act was eventually incorporated into the For the People Act, which has passed the House but stalled in the Senate during the 116th and 117th Congresses.

== Background and content ==
Political ads on television, newspapers, and on the radio are all currently required to disclose the names of those who paid for the advertisement under the Federal Election Campaign Act of 1971, but this is not a requirement online. The bill would amend the 1971 law to make "reasonable efforts" to ensure ads are not purchased "directly or indirectly" by foreign countries. The legislation would require companies to disclose how advertisements were targeted as well as how much the ads cost.

The Act was a bipartisan bill sponsored by Senators Amy Klobuchar (D-MN), Mark Warner (D-VA), and John McCain (R-AZ). The companion version to S. 1989 in the United States House of Representatives, H.R. 4077, was sponsored by Representative Derek Kilmer (D-WA).

== Reaction ==
The Interactive Advertising Bureau has argued against regulation as being too restrictive, in favor instead for self-regulation. Facebook has publicly supported the bill, although campaign transparency advocates have accused the company of lobbying against it.

== See also ==
- For the People Act
- Russian interference in the 2016 United States elections
- Bipartisan Campaign Reform Act
