= 1996 Pierce County Executive election =

- November 5, 1996

Nominee	Doug Sutherland	Wendell Brown	Dale Washam
Party	Republican	Democratic	Independent
Popular vote	105,891	103,675	17,429
Percentage	46.59%	45.61%	7.67%
County Executive before election
Doug Sutherland
Republican
Elected County Executive
Doug Sutherland
Republican

The 1996 Pierce County Executive election took place on November 5, 1996. Incumbent Republican County Executive Doug Sutherland ran for re-election to a second term. He was challenged by County Councilman Wendell Brown, a Democrat and his opponent from 1992.

On election night, Brown held a narrow lead over Sutherland, but when absentee votes were tallied later in the week, Sutherland took the lead. Sutherland ultimately defeated Brown by a narrow, 2,216-vote margin, winning 47 percent of the vote to Brown's 46 percent, with perennial candidate Dale Washam, an independent, receiving 8 percent of the vote.

== Primary election ==
=== Candidates ===
- Doug Sutherland, incumbent County Executive (Republican)
- Wendell Brown, County Councilman, 1992 candidate for County Executive (Democratic)
- Gary Smith, County Sheriff's Department Captain (Democratic)
- Dale Washam, perennial candidate (independent)

=== Results ===
Blanket primary results
Party	Candidate	Votes	%
Republican	Doug Sutherland	57,803	41.59%
Democratic	Wendell Brown	45,916	33.04%
Democratic	Gary L. Smith	26,563	19.11%
Independent	Dale Washam	8,551	6.15%
Write-in		26	0.04%
Total votes		138,991	100.00%

== General election ==
=== Results ===
1996 Pierce County Executive election
Party	Candidate	Votes	%
Republican	Doug Sutherland (inc.)	105,891	46.59%
Democratic	Wendell Brown	103,675	45.61%
Independent	Dale Washam	26,563	19.11%
Write-in		158	0.11%
Total votes		227,291	100.00%
Republican hold			
