= Leonard A. Sawyer =

American politician (1925–2015)

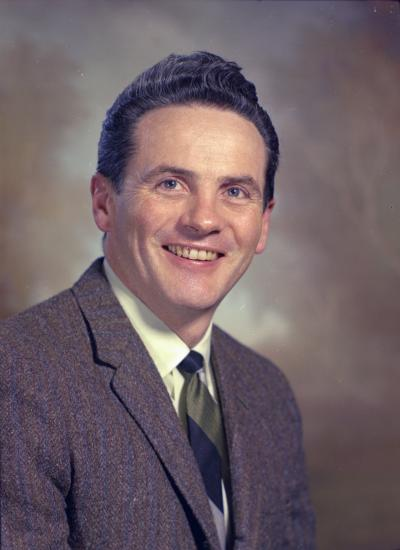
- Sawyer in 1967

37th Speaker of the Washington House of Representatives
- In office January 8, 1973 – January 22, 1976
- Preceded by: Thomas A. Swayze Jr.
- Succeeded by: John L. O'Brien (acting)

Minority Leader of the Washington House of Representatives
- In office January 11, 1971 – January 8, 1973
- Preceded by: John L. O'Brien
- Succeeded by: Thomas A. Swayze Jr.

Member of the Washington House of Representatives from the 25th district
- In office January 10, 1955 – January 10, 1977
- Preceded by: Tom Montgomery
- Succeeded by: George W. Walk

Personal details
- Born: Leonard Alson Sawyer; May 18, 1925 Puyallup, Washington, U.S.
- Died: August 19, 2015 (aged 90) Seatac, Washington, U.S.
- Party: Democratic
- Children: 5
- Education: University of Washington
- Profession: Lawyer

Leonard Alson Sawyer (May 18, 1925 – August 19, 2015) was a lawyer and politician in the American state of Washington. He represented the 25th district (Pierce County) as a Democrat initially elected in 1955, serving until 1975. He was Speaker of the House from 1973 to 1977. He was born in Puyallup, Washington and attended the University of Washington Law School. A veteran of World War II in the United States Navy, Sawyer was an attorney. On August 19, 2015, Sawyer died at the age of 90.
