= Larry Faulk =

American politician

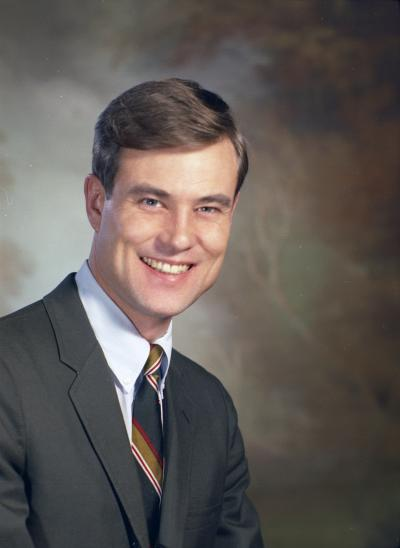
- Faulk in 1967

Member of the Washington Senate from the 26th district
- In office January 9, 1967 – January 11, 1971
- Preceded by: John A. Petrich
- Succeeded by: Booth Gardner

Personal details
- Born: June 20, 1936 (age 90) Tacoma, Washington, U.S.
- Party: Republican

Lawrence J. Faulk (born June 20, 1936) is an American former politician in the state of Washington. He served in the Washington State Senate from 1967 to 1971.

== Early life ==
Faulk was born on June 20, 1936, in Tacoma, Washington. His father was Theodore Faulk, a former football player for the University of Washington and the owner of a collection agency, and his mother was Katherine Faulk. He graduated from Bellarmine High School in 1954, before enlisting in the U.S. Army. He completed basic training at Fort Ord before being transferred to Sandia Base, New Mexico. Faulk was discharged in 1957 and began studying at Seattle University, where he majored in political science and minored in South American history. He was the president of the university's Young Republicans club. He met John F. Kennedy in 1960 when the president visited Seattle.

Faulk graduated in 1961 and began working for Boeing, although he remained actively involved in politics. He was the campaign manager for Ben Larson during the 1962 United States Senate election in Washington, although he lost in the Republican primary. He met Dan Evans the following year and became part of the movement dedicated to convincing the state representative to run for governor, before becoming heavily involved in his campaign in Pierce County. During this work on Evans' campaign, Faulk met his future wife, Mary, whom he married in 1965.

== Political career ==
Faulk decided in 1966 to run for a seat in the 26th legislative district in the Washington State Senate. He campaigned as a moderate Republican with support from the Pierce County Young Republicans and beat the incumbent, Democrat John Petrich, by 515 votes. At thirty years old, he was the youngest member of the state senate.
