= Bruce Dammeier =

American politician from Washington

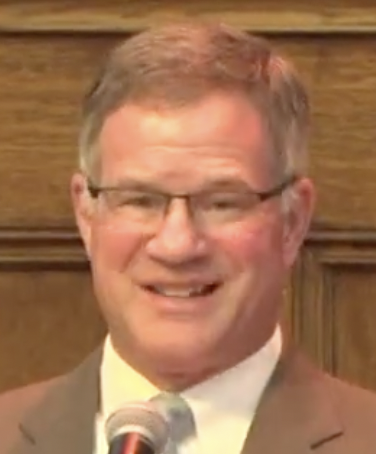
- Dammeier in 2018

6th Pierce County Executive
- In office January 3, 2017 – January 1, 2025
- Preceded by: Pat McCarthy
- Succeeded by: Ryan Mello

Member of the Washington Senate from the 25th district
- In office January 14, 2013 – December 31, 2016
- Preceded by: Jim Kastama
- Succeeded by: Hans Zeiger

Member of the Washington House of Representatives from the 25th district
- In office January 12, 2009 – January 14, 2013
- Preceded by: Rob Cerqui
- Succeeded by: Dawn Morrell

Personal details
- Born: 1961 (age 64–65) Tacoma, Washington, U.S.
- Party: Republican
- Education: United States Naval Academy (BS); University of Washington (MS)

Military service
- Allegiance: United States
- Branch/service: United States Navy
- Years of service: 1979–1987

Bruce F. Dammeier (born 1961) is an American politician and engineer who served as county executive of Pierce County, Washington from 2017 to 2025. A member of the Republican Party, he previously served as a member of both chambers of the Washington State Legislature.

== Early life and education ==
Dammeier was born in Tacoma, Washington. He graduated with distinction from the United States Naval Academy, receiving a Bachelor of Science degree in ocean engineering. He received his Master of Science degree in engineering from the University of Washington.

== Political career ==
Dammeier served two terms on the Puyallup School Board from 2001 to 2009. In 2008, he was elected to the Washington House of Representatives from the 25th District, defeating Democrat Rob Cerqui with 54 percent of the vote. He was re-elected in 2010 with 64 percent of the vote. In 2012, Dammeier was elected to the State Senate, defeating Democrat Eric Herde with 62 percent of the vote.

== Pierce County Executive ==
In 2016, Dammeier opted to run for Pierce County Executive rather than seek re-election to the State Senate. He placed second in the primary election, receiving 30 percent of the vote to Democrat Rick Talbert's 46 percent, and they advanced to the general election. Dammeier narrowly defeated Talbert in the general election, winning 52 percent of the vote to Talbert's 48 percent, and became the first Republican to be elected County Executive since 1996. Dammeier was re-elected in 2020, defeating former Democratic State Representative Larry Seaquist with 55 percent of the vote.
