= Mike Faulk =

American politician (1953–2014)

Member of the Tennessee Senate from the 4th district
- In office January 13, 2009 – January 8, 2013
- Preceded by: Micheal R. Williams
- Succeeded by: Ron Ramsey

Personal details
- Born: September 10, 1953 Kingsport, Tennessee, U.S.
- Died: November 11, 2014 (aged 61)
- Party: Republican
- Education: University of Tennessee at Martin (BS); University of Memphis (JD)

Michael Anthony Faulk (September 10, 1953 – November 11, 2014) was an American jurist and politician. Faulk was born in Kingsport, Tennessee. In November 2008, he was elected to the Tennessee State Senate, defeating incumbent Micheal R. Williams by the narrow margin of 29,417 to 29,171. He was a Republican, representing Claiborne, Grainger, Hancock, Hawkins, Jefferson, and Union counties. Before his election to the Senate, he worked as a personal injury attorney in Church Hill, Tennessee. In March 2012, he announced he would not be seeking re-election for a second term. He served in the Senate until 2013.

Faulk held a B.S. from the University of Tennessee at Martin and a J.D. from the University of Memphis. He attended Oak Grove Baptist Church and was a divorced father of two.

He died on November 11, 2014, of cancer at the age of 61. He had esophageal cancer that metastasized to his liver.
