= Derek Kilmer =

American politician (born 1974)

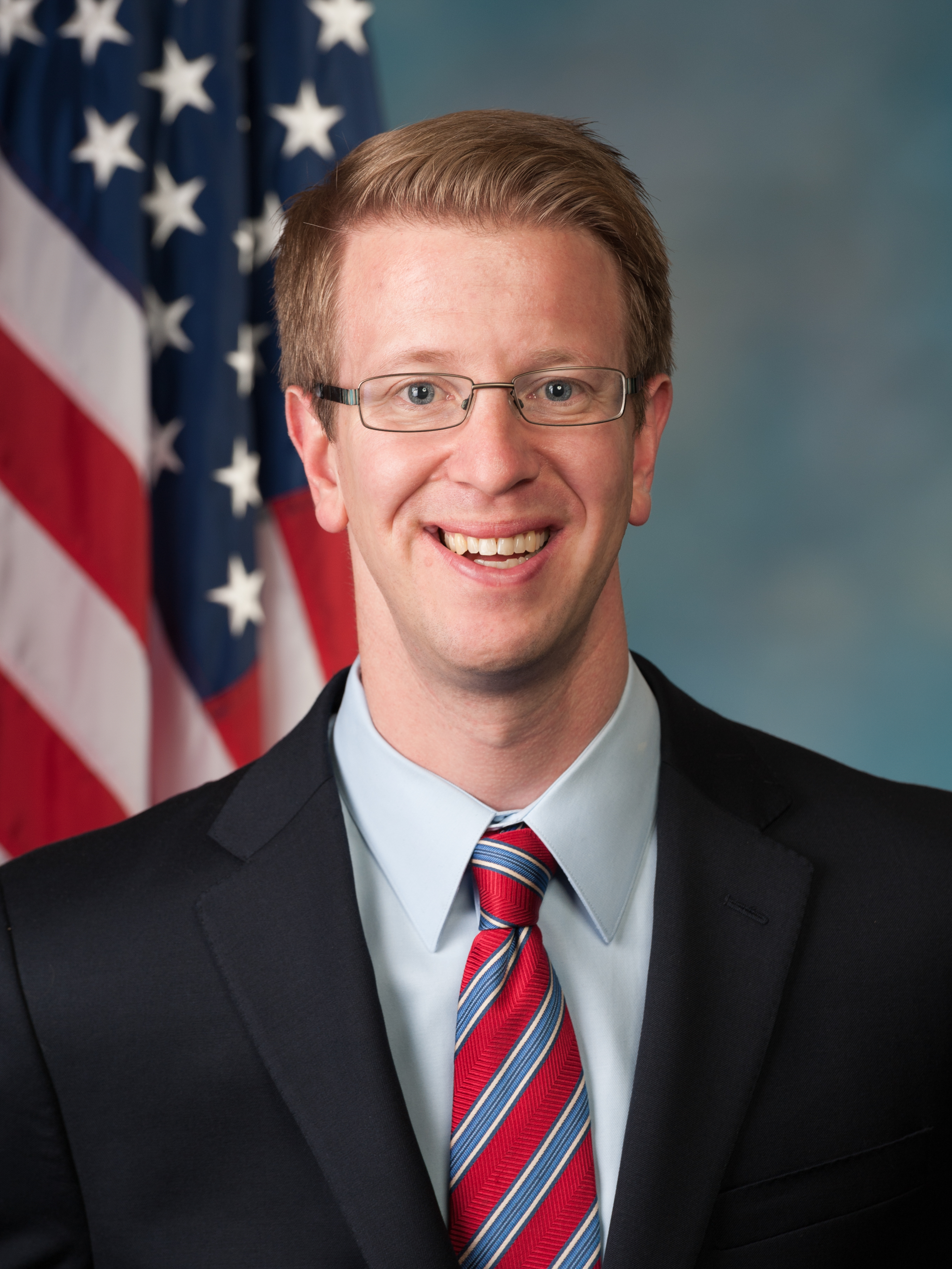
- Official portrait, 2013

Chair of the House Modernization Committee
- In office January 4, 2019 – January 3, 2023
- Preceded by: Position established
- Succeeded by: Position abolished

Chair of the New Democrat Coalition
- In office January 3, 2019 – January 3, 2021
- Preceded by: Jim Himes
- Succeeded by: Suzan DelBene

Member of the U.S. House of Representatives from Washington's 6th district
- In office January 3, 2013 – January 3, 2025
- Preceded by: Norm Dicks
- Succeeded by: Emily Randall

Member of the Washington Senate from the 26th district
- In office January 8, 2007 – December 10, 2012
- Preceded by: Robert Oke
- Succeeded by: Nathan Schlicher

Member of the Washington House of Representatives from the 26th district
- In office January 10, 2005 – January 8, 2007
- Preceded by: Lois McMahan
- Succeeded by: Larry Seaquist

Personal details
- Born: Derek Christian Kilmer; January 1, 1974 (age 52) Port Angeles, Washington, U.S.
- Party: Democratic
- Education: Princeton University (BA); Green Templeton College, Oxford (MA, PhD)
- Kilmer's voice Kilmer supporting the Recovering America's Wildlife Act. Recorded June 14, 2022

Derek Christian Kilmer (born January 1, 1974) is an American politician who served as the U.S. representative for Washington's 6th congressional district from 2013 to 2025. A member of the Democratic Party, he served as a member of the Washington House of Representatives from 2005 to 2007 and the Washington State Senate from 2007 to 2012.

In March 2012, Kilmer announced he was running to succeed Norm Dicks in Washington's 6th congressional district. On November 6, he won the general election to become the district's new representative.

On November 9, 2023, Kilmer announced that he would not seek re-election in 2024. Kilmer was succeeded by Emily Randall.

== Early life, education, and business career ==
Derek Christian Kilmer was born and raised in Port Angeles, Washington. Both his parents were public school teachers. Kilmer earned a B.A. in public affairs with a certificate in American studies from Princeton University's Woodrow Wilson School of Public and International Affairs in 1996. He completed his 184-page senior thesis, "Recovering From the Addiction: The Social and Economic Impacts of the Pacific Northwest Timber Crisis; An Analysis of the Implementation of the Clinton Forest Plan on Washington's Olympic Peninsula", under the supervision of Steven R. Brechin. He earned a Marshall Scholarship to obtain his Ph.D. in comparative social policy from the Department of Social Policy and Intervention at Green Templeton College, Oxford.

Kilmer is a former business consultant for McKinsey and Company. He was also a business retention manager for the Economic Development Board for Tacoma-Pierce County, is a trustee for Tacoma Community College, and served on the board of Peninsula Schools Education Foundation.

== Washington legislature ==
=== Elections ===
In 2004, Kilmer challenged incumbent Republican state representative Lois McMahan of Washington's 26th house district, seat 2. He defeated her 50%–48%, a difference of 1,009 votes.

In 2006, Republican state senator Bob Oke decided to retire. Kilmer decided to run for Washington's 26th senate district. He defeated Republican Jim Hines 60%–40%. In 2010, he was reelected, defeating Marty McClendon 59%–41%.

=== Tenure ===
In 2007, Kilmer was one of just three Democratic state senators to vote against the bill that would allow labor unions to spend non-members' bargaining fees on political causes without first getting their permission.

He sponsored the Senate bill that would increase fines to pay for a new $849 million Tacoma Narrows bridge in his district.

Business groups praised Kilmer for being one of the most pro-business Democrats in Olympia. He is the three-time recipient of the "LEADER Award" from the Washington Economic Development Association. He received the Legislative Business Star Award from Enterprise Washington's Business Institute. He was named Legislator of the Year by the Department of Veterans Affairs. He was recognized by the Northwest Chapter of the Paralyzed Veterans of America as Legislator of the Year. He was also named Legislator of the Year by the Washington Council of Police & Sheriffs. He was named an honorary fire chief by the Washington Fire Chiefs.

=== Committee assignments ===
Senate

- Capital Budget Committee (Chair)
- Economic Development, Trade, & Innovation Committee
- Higher Education & Workforce Development Committee
- Ways and Means Committee (Vice Chair)

== U.S. House of Representatives ==
=== Elections ===
2012

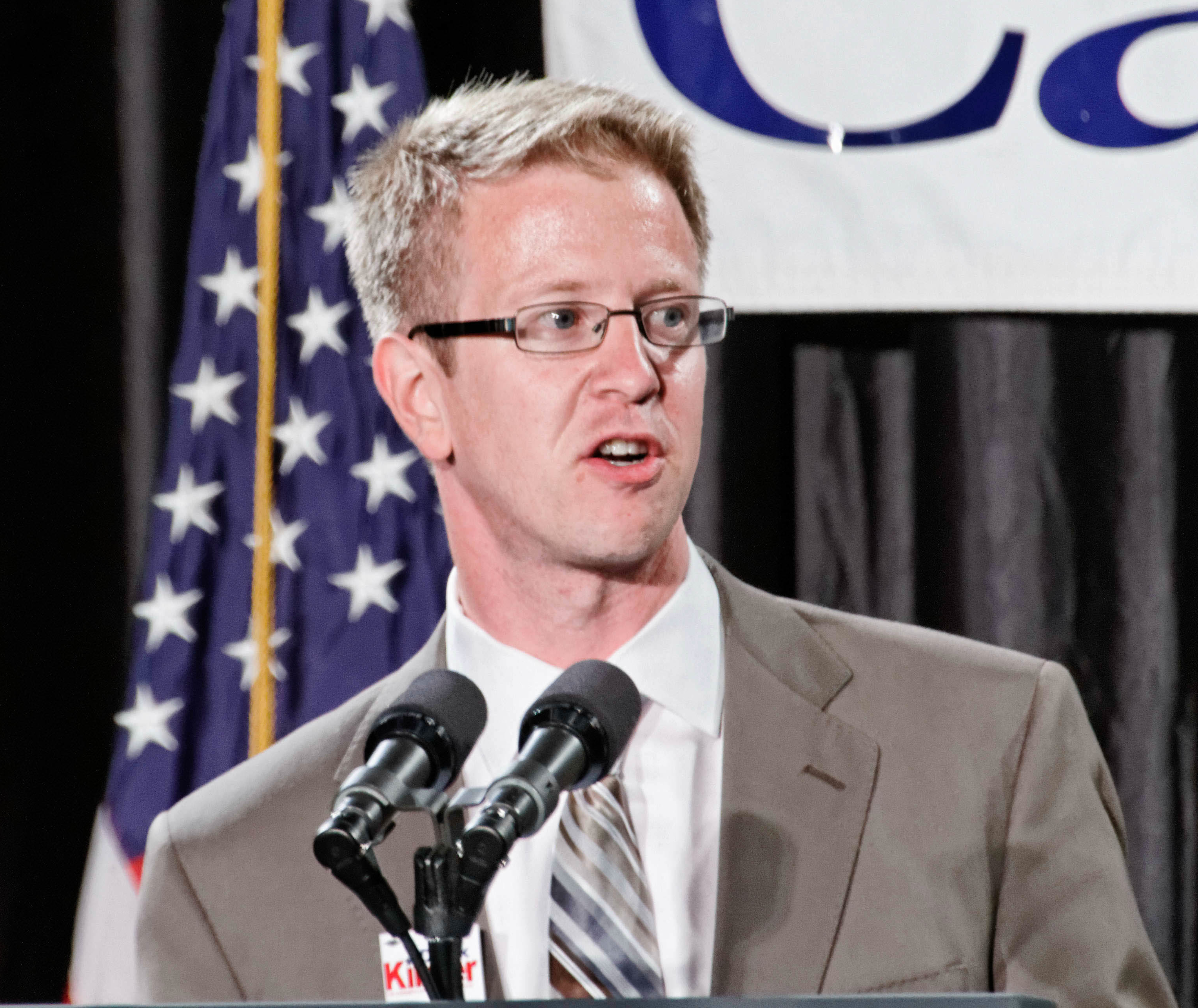
Kilmer in 2012

After redistricting, U.S. representative Norm Dicks decided to retire. Kilmer decided to run for the newly redrawn Washington's 6th congressional district. He was endorsed by The Seattle Times, which called him "a problem solver who can be bipartisan." The News Tribune praised him for having "an uncommon understanding of trade, business taxation, smart regulation, job creation and other fundamentals of economic growth." Port Angeles, Kilmer's hometown and an area he was elected to represent, suffers from an unemployment rate 2.3% higher than the Washington State average, consistent with the rate of increase recorded before he took office. In the general election, he defeated Republican nominee Bill Driscoll, 59%–41%. He won all six counties in the district.

=== Tenure ===
From 2019 to 2023, Kilmer chaired the Select Committee on the Modernization of Congress. Kilmer chaired the New Democrat Coalition from 2019 to 2021, and was succeeded by U.S. Rep. Susan DelBene, a fellow Washingtonian from the state's 1st congressional district.

Kilmer voted with President Joe Biden's stated position 100% of the time in the 117th Congress, according to a FiveThirtyEight analysis.

==== Israel policy ====
Kilmer was a cosponsor of the United States–Israel Strategic Partnership Act of 2013.

Kilmer was part of a 37-member congressional delegation that visited Israel. The trip was sponsored by the American Israel Education Foundation, with the goal of working to strengthen strategic economic and military cooperation between Israel and the United States.

Through his co-sponsorship of the United States–Israel Strategic Partnership Act of 2013, Kilmer supports supporting Israel's ability to defend itself and providing assistance for collaboration in the fields of energy, water, homeland security, agriculture, and alternative fuel technologies.

=== Legislation ===
On October 29, 2013, Kilmer introduced the American Savings Promotion Act (H.R. 3374; 113th Congress), a bill that would authorize some financial institutions to conduct a contest, known as a "savings promotion raffle", in which the sole requirement for a chance of winning designated prizes is the deposit of a specified amount of money in a savings account or program, where each ticket or entry has an equal chance of being drawn.

Kilmer was ranked the 33rd most bipartisan member of the House of Representatives during the 114th Congress (and the third most bipartisan member of the U.S. House of Representatives from Washington) in the Bipartisan Index created by the Lugar Center and the McCourt School of Public Policy that ranks members of Congress by their degree of bipartisanship (by measuring how often each member's bills attract co-sponsors from the opposite party and each member co-sponsors bills by members of the opposite party).

Kilmer sponsored the Honest Ads Act, election reform legislation that would have addressed Federal Election Commission law and citizen financing of campaigns, and required disclosure of financing of social media electioneering.

On December 16, 2021, Kilmer introduced the Tiny Homes for Veterans Act 2021 (H.R.6307; 117th Congress), a bill that would require the Department of Veterans Affairs to implement a six-year pilot program to provide grants for the creation of five villages of tiny homes for homeless veterans. Under the bill, the villages must have associated supportive services to allow veterans to build and live in energy efficient homes, maintain social connections with each other, learn skills, and receive critical counseling.

=== Committee assignments ===
- Committee on Appropriations
  - Subcommittee on Defense
  - Subcommittee on Interior, Environment, and Related Agencies
  - Subcommittee on Energy and Water Development
- Select Committee on the Modernization of Congress (Chair)

=== Caucus memberships ===
- New Democrat Coalition
- Congressional Arts Caucus
- Congressional NextGen 9-1-1 Caucus
- Congressional United Kingdom Caucus
- Congressional Equality Caucus
- Climate Solutions Caucus
- U.S.-Japan Caucus
- Expand Social Security Caucus
- Blue Collar Caucus
- Rare Disease Caucus
- United States–China Working Group

== Post-congressional career ==
On November 9, 2023, Kilmer announced he would not seek a seventh term to the U.S. House of Representatives. Kilmer left Congress on January 3, 2025. He subsequently joined The Rockefeller Foundation as Senior Vice President of U.S. Program and Policy.

== Publications ==
=== Articles ===
- "How to take big money out of congressional races," The Seattle Times, November 12, 2015.
- "Facebook hearings are not enough: Congress must act to defend democracy," The Seattle Times, April 16, 2018.
- "Public servants aren't the enemy. They're us," The Stand, June 19, 2018.
- "The bipartisan effort to reform Congress," CNN, June 21, 2019.
- "Why I support articles of impeachment," Kitsap Sun, December 17, 2019.
- "The Jan. 6 Capitol attack proved America's democracy is fragile. Here's how to protect it," The News Tribune, January 8, 2022.
- "I won't run again for Congress, but I remain hopeful that we can make things better," The Seattle Times, November 9, 2023.
- "Congress's disaster recovery plan needs a constitutional fix," The Hill, March 19, 2024.

== Sources ==
- "Project Vote Smart – The Voter's Self Defense System". Project Vote Smart.
- "House committees: Denny Heck to Financial Services, Derek Kilmer to Science, Space & Technology". Tacoma News Tribune. Archived from the original on October 19, 2014.
- "CQ – 113th Congress: Derek Kilmer, D-Wash. (6th District)".
- "Local News – The Olympian".
- "Democratic state Sen. Kilmer wins race to replace U.S. Rep. Dicks". The Seattle Times.

U.S. House of Representatives
| Preceded by Norm Dicks | Member of the U.S. House of Representatives from Washington's 6th congressional district 2013–2025 | Succeeded by Emily Randall |
| New office | Chair of the House Modernization Committee; 2019–2023 | Position abolished |
Party political offices
| Preceded by Jim Himes | Chair of the New Democrat Coalition; 2019–2021 | Succeeded by Suzan DelBene |
U.S. order of precedence (ceremonial)
| Preceded by Jamie Herrera Beutler as Former U.S. Representative | Order of precedence of the United States as Former U.S. Representative | Succeeded by J.D. Hayworth as Former U.S. Representative |
