= Washington's 26th legislative district =

American legislative district

Map of Washington's 26th legislative district

Washington's 26th legislative district is one of forty-nine districts in Washington state for representation in the state legislature.

The district includes southeastern Kitsap Peninsula from Bremerton and Port Orchard in the north to Gig Harbor and the Key Peninsula in the south.

The district's legislators are state senator Deborah Krishnadasan (D) and state representatives Adison Richards (D; position 1) and Michelle Caldier (R; position 2).

== See also ==
- Washington Redistricting Commission
- Washington State Legislature
- Washington State Senate
- Washington House of Representatives
