= 2022 United States Senate election in Washington =

- November 8, 2022
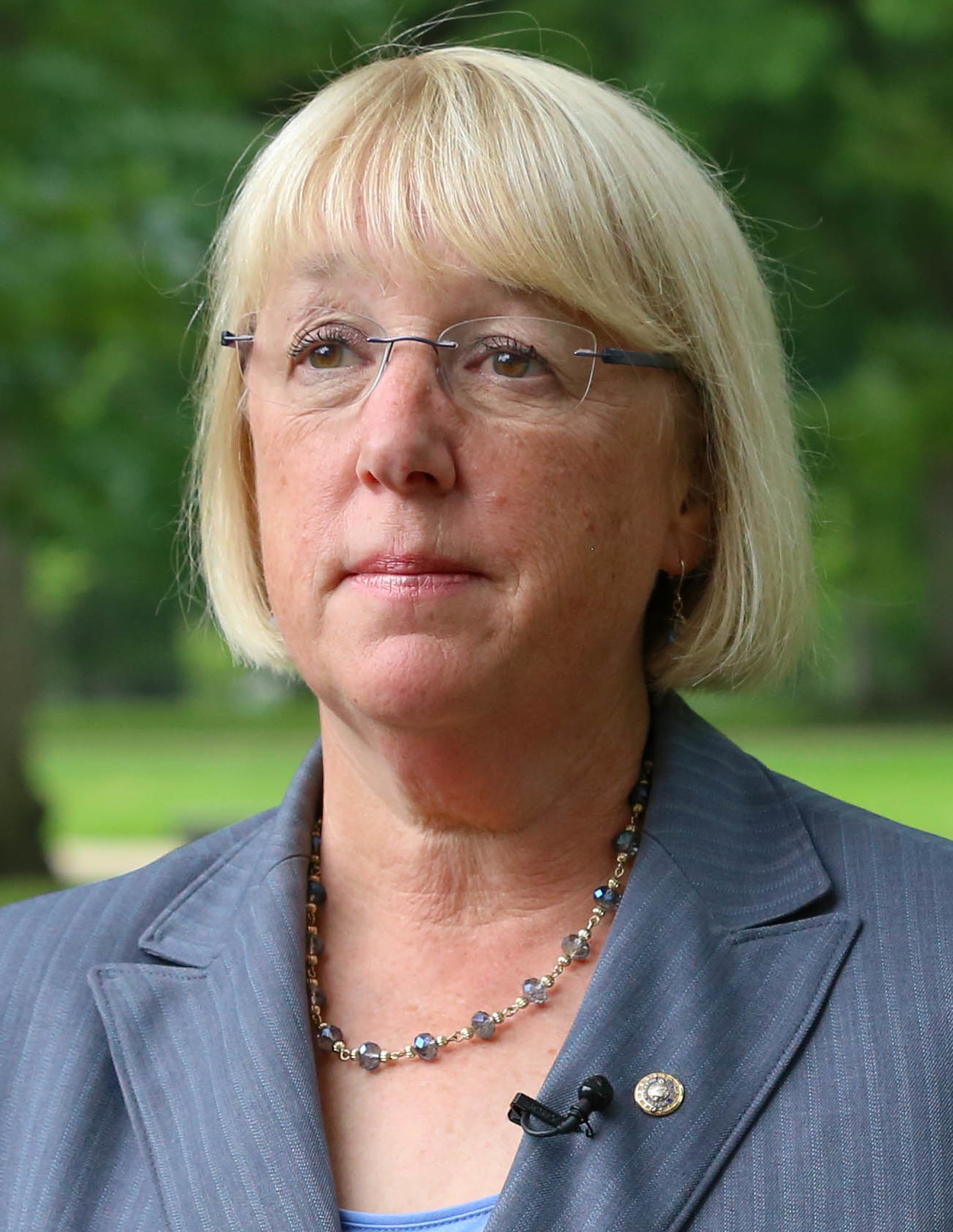

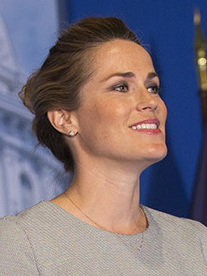
Candidate	Patty Murray	Tiffany Smiley
Party	Democratic	Republican
Popular vote	1,741,827	1,299,322
Percentage	57.15%	42.63%
- Murray: 40–50% 50–60% 60–70% 70–80% 80–90% >90% Smiley: 40–50% 50–60% 60–70% 70–80% 80–90% >90% Tie: 40–50% 50% No data
U.S. senator before election
Patty Murray
Democratic
Elected U.S. senator
Patty Murray
Democratic

The 2022 United States Senate election in Washington was held on November 8, 2022, to elect a member of the United States Senate to represent the state of Washington. Murray had won election to a fifth term in 2016 with 59% of the vote.

Because Washington has a blanket primary system, parties did not nominate their own candidates to run in the general election. Instead, every candidate appeared on the same ballot, regardless of their party affiliation. The top two candidates in the August 2 nonpartisan blanket primary then advanced to the general election. Murray received 52.3% of the primary vote and advanced to face Republican Tiffany Smiley.

Although Washington has been a reliably blue state for over 30 years, many polls showed that Murray only had a narrow lead over Smiley, and some polls had Smiley within the margin of error. A couple of late polls had the two candidates tied; such polls caused most pundits to downgrade their forecast from "safe Democratic" to "likely Democratic", and Republicans believed that Smiley had a chance of pulling off an upset. Despite the predictions of a close race, Murray defeated Smiley and won re-election to a sixth term by a 14.5-point margin. Although this was a significantly larger margin of victory for Murray than what was expected, it was fairly consistent with Washington's partisan lean. Smiley conceded the following day. Despite her loss, she made significant gains in several counties, particularly in the Southwestern and Eastern parts of the state.

Following the election, Murray was elected president pro tempore for the 118th Congress, becoming the first woman to hold the role.

== Primary election ==
=== Democratic candidates ===
==== Advanced to general ====
- Patty Murray, incumbent U.S. Senator and Assistant Democratic Leader

==== Eliminated in primary ====
- Pano Churchill, candidate for U.S. Senate in 2016
- Sam Cusmir
- Ravin Pierre, aerospace engineer and data scientist
- Mohammed Said, physician and perennial candidate
- Bryan Solstin, aerospace engineer and software developer

==== Withdrawn ====
- David Ishii
- Nicolaust Sleister
- Robert Kirby

=== Republican candidates ===
==== Advanced to general ====
- Tiffany Smiley, nurse

==== Eliminated in primary ====
- John Guenther, state employee
- Bill Hirt, perennial candidate

==== Withdrawn ====
- Bob Hagglund, IT professional
- Isaac Holyk, software developer

=== Third party and independent candidates ===
==== Eliminated in primary ====
- Thor Amundson (independent), candidate for U.S. Senate in 2016 and 2018 and governor in 2020
- Jon Butler (no party preference)
- Henry Clay Dennison (Socialist Workers), perennial candidate
- Dan Phan Doan (no party preference)
- Martin D. Hash (no party preference)
- Chuck Jackson (independent), candidate for U.S. Senate in 2012 and 2016
- Leon Lawson (Trump Republican), candidate for governor in 2020
- Naz Paul (independent), real estate developer
- Dave Saulibio (JFK Republican), U.S. Army veteran, candidate for Washington's 5th congressional district in 2018 and Washington's 8th congressional district in 2020

==== Withdrawn ====
- Mfumu Metamorphosis Mpiana
- Larry Hussey

=== Endorsements ===
Patty Murray (D)

Organizations

- Council for a Livable World
- EMILY's List
- End Citizens United
- Feminist Majority PAC
- Giffords
- Jewish Democratic Council of America
- King County Democratic Party
- League of Conservation Voters
- Let America Vote
- NARAL Pro-Choice America
- National Women's Political Caucus
- Natural Resources Defense Council
- Population Connection Action Fund
- Sierra Club
- Women's Political Committee

Labor unions

- Service Employees International Union Local 775
- Washington AFL–CIO

Newspapers

- The Seattle Times
- The Stranger
Tiffany Smiley (R)

Executive Branch officials

- Nikki Haley, United States Ambassador to the United Nations (2017–2018) and former governor of South Carolina (2011–2017)

U.S. Senators

- Joni Ernst, U.S. Senator from Iowa (2015–present)
- Rick Scott, U.S Senator from Florida (2019–present) and former governor of Florida (2011–2019)

U.S. Representatives

- Doc Hastings, former U.S. Representative from Washington's 4th congressional district (1995–2015)
- Cathy McMorris Rodgers, U.S. Representative from Washington's 5th congressional district (2005–2025)
- Elise Stefanik, U.S. Representative from New York's 21st congressional district (2015–present)

Individuals

- John Stockton, former NBA player

Organizations

- Maggie's List
- Benton County Republican Party
- King County Republican Party
- Stand for America PAC
- Washington State Republican Party
- Winning For Women PAC

=== Results ===
County results Murray: 30–40%; 40–50%; 50–60%; 60–70%; 70–80%; Smiley: 30–40%; 40–50%; 50–60%; 60–70%

Congressional district results Murray: 40–50%; 50–60%; 60–70%; 80–90%; Smiley: 40–50%; 50–60%

Blanket primary election results
Party	Candidate	Votes	%
Democratic	Patty Murray (incumbent)	1,002,811	52.26%
Republican	Tiffany Smiley	646,917	33.71%
Trump Republican	Leon Lawson	59,134	3.08%
Republican	John Guenther	55,426	2.89%
Democratic	Ravin Pierre	22,172	1.16%
JFK Republican	Dave Saulibio	19,341	1.01%
Independent	Naz Paul	18,858	0.98%
Republican	Bill Hirt	15,276	0.80%
Democratic	Mohammad Hassan Said	13,995	0.73%
Socialist Workers	Henry Clay Dennison	13,901	0.72%
Democratic	Dr Pano Churchill	11,859	0.62%
Democratic	Bryan Solstin	9,627	0.50%
Independent	Charlie (Chuck) Jackson	8,604	0.45%
Independent	Jon Butler	5,413	0.28%
Independent	Thor Amundson	5,133	0.27%
No party preference	Martin D. Hash	4,725	0.25%
No party preference	Dan Phan Doan	3,049	0.16%
Democratic	Sam Cusmir	2,688	0.14%
Total votes		1,918,929	100.00%

Combined partisan vote by county Democratic: 40–50%; 50–60%; 60–70%; 70–80%; Republican: 40–50%; 50–60%; 60–70%; 70–80%

Combined partisan vote by congressional district Democratic: 40–50%; 50–60%; 60–70%; 80–90%; Republican: 50–60%; 60–70%

Counties that flipped from Democratic to Republican

- Asotin (largest city: Clarkston)
- Cowlitz (largest city: Longview)
- Grays Harbor (largest city: Aberdeen)
- Mason (largest city: Shelton)
- Okanogan (largest city: Omak)
- Pacific (largest city: Raymond)
- Skamania (largest city: Carson)
- Spokane (largest city: Spokane)
- Wahkiakum (largest city: Puget Island)
- Walla Walla (largest city: Walla Walla)
- Whitman (largest city: Pullman)

==== By congressional district ====
District	Murray	Smiley	Representative
1st	57%	30%	Suzan DelBene
2nd	54%	33%	Rick Larsen
3rd	40%	37%	Jaime Herrera Beutler
4th	31%	53%	Dan Newhouse
5th	38%	46%	Cathy McMorris Rodgers
6th	53%	33%	Derek Kilmer
7th	82%	10%	Pramila Jayapal
8th	47%	40%	Kim Schrier
9th	65%	22%	Adam Smith
10th	52%	34%	Marilyn Strickland

== General election ==
=== Debates ===
Two debates were held, the first on October 23 at Gonzaga University. The second was town hall-style forum on October 30 in the KIRO-TV studio in Seattle.

Murray's campaign declined an invitation to a scheduled debate on October 25 at Seattle University.

=== Predictions ===
Source	Ranking	As of
The Cook Political Report	Likely D	October 18, 2022
Inside Elections	Likely D	July 1, 2022
Sabato's Crystal Ball	Likely D	October 19, 2022
Politico	Lean D	November 3, 2022
RCP	Tossup	October 30, 2022
Fox News	Likely D	November 1, 2022
DDHQ	Likely D	September 12, 2022
538	Likely D	October 19, 2022
The Economist	Likely D	September 7, 2022

=== Post-primary endorsements ===
Patty Murray (D)

U.S. Executive Branch officials

- Kamala Harris, Vice President of the United States (2021–2025), and former U.S. Senator from California (2017–2021)

Labor unions

- National Education Association

Newspapers

- The Olympian
- Tacoma News Tribune
- Tri-City Herald
Tiffany Smiley (R)

U.S. Senators

- Marsha Blackburn, U.S. Senator from Tennessee (2019–present) and former U.S. Representative from Tennessee's 7th congressional district (2003–2019)
- Tom Cotton, U.S. Senator from Arkansas (2015–present) and former U.S. Representative from Arkansas's 4th congressional district (2013–2015)
- Steve Daines, U.S. Senator from Montana (2015–present) and former U.S. Representative from Montana's at-large congressional district (2013–2015)
- Tim Scott, U.S. Senator from South Carolina (2013–present) and former U.S. Representative from South Carolina's 1st congressional district (2011–2013)

Governors

- Larry Hogan, 62nd governor of Maryland (2015–2023)
- Kristi Noem, Governor of South Dakota (2019–2025), and former U.S. Representative from South Dakota's at-large congressional district (2011–2019)

Organizations

- Log Cabin Republicans

=== Polling ===
Aggregate polls

Source of poll aggregation	Dates administered	Dates updated	Patty Murray (D)	Tiffany Smiley (R)	Undecided (Note: Calculated by taking the difference of 100% and all other candidates combined.)	Margin
Real Clear Politics	October 14–31, 2022	November 3, 2022	49.3%	46.3%	4.4%	Murray +3.0
FiveThirtyEight	May 25, 2021 – November 8, 2022	November 7, 2022	49.6%	44.9%	6.5%	Murray +4.7
270ToWin	October 21 – November 1, 2022	November 7, 2022	49.5%	44.5%	6.0%	Murray +4.3
Average			49.5%	45.2%	5.3%	Murray +4.3

Graphical summary

Poll source	Date(s) administered	Sample size (Note: Key: A – all adults RV – registered voters LV – likely voters V – unclear)	Margin of error	Patty Murray (D)	Tiffany Smiley (R)	Other	Undecided
Moore Information Group (R) (Note: Poll conducted for the NRSC and the Evergreen Principles PAC, which supports Smiley.)	November 3–5, 2022	500 (LV)	± 4.0%	47%	47%	–	5%
InsiderAdvantage (R) (Note: This poll was sponsored by American Greatness, a conservative news outlet.)	October 31, 2022	550 (LV)	± 4.2%	48%	46%	–	6%
The Trafalgar Group (R)	October 25–28, 2022	1,207 (LV)	± 2.9%	49%	48%	–	2%
Triton Polling & Research (Note: Poll conducted for KHQ-TV.)	October 26–27, 2022	506 (LV)	± 4.4%	51%	45%	–	4%
Moore Information Group (R)	October 20–22, 2022	500 (LV)	± 4.0%	46%	46%	–	8%
KAConsulting (R) (Note: Poll conducted for Citizens United, a conservative non-profit organization.)	October 20–22, 2022	500 (LV)	± 4.4%	48%	42%	4% (Note: "Other/Refused" with 4%)	6%
co/efficient (R)	October 19–20, 2022	1,181 (LV)	± 3.0%	48%	45%	–	7%
Public Policy Polling (D) (Note: This poll was sponsored by the Northwest Progressive Institute.)	October 19–20, 2022	782 (LV)	± 3.5%	52%	42%	–	6%
SurveyUSA	October 14–19, 2022	589 (LV)	± 5.0%	49%	41%	–	10%
Civiqs	October 15–18, 2022	698 (LV)	± 4.5%	55%	41%	3% (Note: "Someone else" with 3%)	2%
Emerson College	September 29 – October 1, 2022	782 (LV)	± 3.4%	51%	42%	–	7%
Public Policy Polling (D)	September 27–28, 2022	770 (V)	± 3.5%	52%	40%	–	8%
OnMessage Inc. (R) (Note: This poll was sponsored by the Senate Opportunity Fund.)	September 20–27, 2022	600 (LV)	± 4.0%	46%	42%	5% (Note: "Someone else" with 5%)	6%
Strategies 360	September 22–25, 2022	500 (RV)	± 4.4%	50%	36%	–	14%
Strategies 360	September 22–25, 2022	370 (LV)	± 5.1%	52%	40%	–	8%
The Trafalgar Group (R)	September 21–24, 2022	1,091 (LV)	± 2.9%	49%	47%	–	5%
Elway Research	September 12–15, 2022	403 (LV)	± 3.0%	50%	37%	–	12%
Public Policy Polling (D)	September 6–7, 2022	620 (V)	± 3.0%	48%	39%	–	13%
Moore Information Group (R)	September 2022	500 (LV)	± 4.0%	48%	44%	–	8%
The Trafalgar Group (R)	August 30 – September 1, 2022	1,087 (LV)	± 2.9%	49%	46%	–	5%
McLaughlin & Associates (R)	August 15–17, 2022	500 (LV)	± 4.4%	49%	43%	–	8%
Elway Research	July 7–11, 2022	400 (RV)	± 4.5%	53%	33%	–	15%
SurveyUSA	July 6–10, 2022	596 (LV)	± 5.0%	51%	33%	–	16%
The Tarrance Group (R) (Note: This poll was sponsored by Smiley's campaign.)	June 14–19, 2022	600 (LV)	± 4.0%	48%	43%	–	9%
Public Policy Polling (D)	June 1–2, 2022	1,039 (LV)	± 3.0%	51%	40%	–	8%
Public Policy Polling (D)	February 17–18, 2022	700 (LV)	± 3.7%	50%	41%	–	9%
Public Policy Polling (D)	November 10–11, 2021	909 (LV)	± 3.3%	50%	37%	–	13%
SurveyUSA	October 25–28, 2021	542 (RV)	± 5.2%	49%	31%	–	20%
Public Policy Polling (D)	May 25–26, 2021	992 (LV)	± 3.1%	53%	37%	–	10%

Hypothetical polling

Patty Murray vs. generic Republican

Poll source	Date(s) administered	Sample size	Margin of error	Patty Murray (D)	Generic Republican	Undecided
Elway Research	December 26–28, 2021	400 (RV)	± 5.0%	42%	39%	19%

Patty Murray vs. generic opponent

Poll source	Date(s) administered	Sample size	Margin of error	Patty Murray (D)	Generic Opponent	Undecided
McLaughlin & Associates (R)	August 15–17, 2022	500 (LV)	± 4.4%	44%	44%	12%

=== Results ===
2022 United States Senate election in Washington
Party	Candidate	Votes	%	±%
Democratic	Patty Murray (incumbent)	1,741,827	57.15%	−1.86%
Republican	Tiffany Smiley	1,299,322	42.63%	+1.64%
Write-in		6,751	0.22%	N/A
Total votes		3,047,900	100.00%	N/A
Democratic hold				

==== By county ====
By county

County	Patty Murray Democratic		Tiffany Smiley Republican		Write-in Various		Margin		Total
County	%	#	%	#	%	#	%	#	Total
Adams	23.46%	969	76.25%	3,150	0.29%	12	–52.80%	–2,181	4,131
Asotin	35.27%	3,181	64.58%	5,824	0.14%	13	–29.31%	–2,643	9,018
Benton	33.68%	25,513	66.15%	50,108	0.17%	128	–32.47%	–24,595	75,749
Chelan	41.94%	14,373	57.87%	19,833	0.20%	67	–15.93%	–5,460	34,273
Clallam	51.60%	20,784	48.17%	19,401	0.23%	94	3.43%	1,383	40,279
Clark	51.09%	105,058	48.76%	100,260	0.14%	298	2.33%	4,798	205,616
Columbia	27.17%	592	72.28%	1,575	0.55%	12	–45.11%	–983	2,179
Cowlitz	38.80%	17,439	61.07%	27,446	0.13%	57	–22.27%	–10,007	44,942
Douglas	32.73%	5,275	67.05%	10,806	0.22%	36	–34.32%	–5,531	16,117
Ferry	31.04%	1,060	68.76%	2,348	0.20%	7	–37.72%	–1,288	3,415
Franklin	31.61%	7,022	68.31%	15,174	0.08%	18	–36.70%	–8,152	22,214
Garfield	23.85%	307	75.91%	977	0.23%	3	–52.06%	–670	1,287
Grant	26.83%	7,221	73.03%	19,655	0.13%	36	–46.20%	–12,434	26,912
Grays Harbor	46.26%	13,600	53.46%	15,718	0.28%	81	–7.20%	–2,118	29,399
Island	55.00%	23,680	44.77%	19,275	0.24%	102	10.23%	4,405	43,057
Jefferson	70.62%	14,970	29.18%	6,185	0.21%	44	41.44%	8,785	21,199
King	75.05%	668,692	24.73%	220,307	0.22%	1,943	50.33%	448,385	890,942
Kitsap	57.51%	70,939	42.26%	52,134	0.23%	278	15.25%	18,805	123,351
Kittitas	39.99%	8,318	59.84%	12,446	0.16%	34	–19.85%	–4,128	20,798
Klickitat	41.89%	4,798	57.96%	6,639	0.16%	18	–16.07%	–1,841	11,455
Lewis	31.29%	11,263	68.50%	24,654	0.21%	75	–37.21%	–13,391	35,992
Lincoln	23.12%	1,423	76.63%	4,716	0.24%	15	–53.51%	–3,293	6,154
Mason	46.74%	13,777	52.97%	15,612	0.29%	86	–6.23%	–1,835	29,475
Okanogan	40.01%	6,644	59.78%	9,926	0.20%	34	–19.77%	–3,282	16,604
Pacific	48.32%	5,771	51.39%	6,137	0.29%	35	–3.06%	–366	11,943
Pend Oreille	29.94%	2,032	69.82%	4,739	0.24%	16	–39.89%	–2,707	6,787
Pierce	52.69%	175,164	47.02%	156,331	0.29%	959	5.66%	18,833	332,454
San Juan	72.88%	8,254	26.97%	3,055	0.15%	17	45.90%	5,199	11,326
Skagit	51.57%	29,316	48.19%	27,394	0.24%	139	3.38%	1,922	56,849
Skamania	42.07%	2,620	57.80%	3,599	0.13%	8	–15.72%	–979	6,227
Snohomish	57.52%	184,430	42.21%	135,339	0.27%	864	15.31%	49,091	320,633
Spokane	45.46%	100,719	54.34%	120,369	0.20%	443	–8.87%	–19,650	221,531
Stevens	26.50%	6,073	73.31%	16,803	0.19%	43	–46.82%	–10,730	22,919
Thurston	58.04%	73,189	41.69%	52,570	0.28%	347	16.35%	20,619	126,106
Wahkiakum	39.26%	1,007	60.47%	1,551	0.27%	7	–21.21%	–544	2,565
Walla Walla	41.38%	10,039	58.50%	14,192	0.12%	29	–17.12%	–4,153	24,260
Whatcom	59.32%	65,950	40.51%	45,038	0.16%	182	18.81%	20,912	111,170
Whitman	49.81%	7,824	49.96%	7,848	0.22%	35	–0.15%	–24	15,707
Yakima	35.86%	22,541	63.93%	40,188	0.22%	136	–28.07%	–17,647	62,865
Total	57.15%	1,741,827	42.63%	1,299,322	0.22%	6,751	14.52%	442,505	3,047,900

Counties that flipped from Democratic to Republican

- Grays Harbor (largest city: Aberdeen)
- Mason (largest city: Shelton)
- Pacific (largest city: Raymond)
- Whitman (largest city: Pullman)

==== By congressional district ====
Murray won seven of ten congressional districts, with the remaining three going to Smiley, including one that elected a Democrat.

District	Murray	Smiley	Representative
1st	62%	37%	Suzan DelBene
2nd	59%	41%	Rick Larsen
3rd	46%	54%	Jaime Herrera Beutler (117th Congress)
3rd	46%	54%	Marie Gluesenkamp Perez (118th Congress)
4th	34%	66%	Dan Newhouse
5th	42%	58%	Cathy McMorris Rodgers
6th	57%	43%	Derek Kilmer
7th	87%	13%	Pramila Jayapal
8th	51%	49%	Kim Schrier
9th	71%	29%	Adam Smith
10th	57%	43%	Marilyn Strickland

== See also ==
- 2022 United States Senate elections

== Notes ==
Partisan clients
