= 2018 United States House of Representatives elections in Washington =

- November 6, 2018

All ten Washington seats to the United States House of Representatives
	Majority party	Minority party
Party	Democratic	Republican
Last election	6	4
Seats won	7	3
Seat change	▲1	▼1
Popular vote	1,888,593	1,048,712
Percentage	62.50%	34.70%
Swing	▲7.23%	▼10.03%

Democratic
50–60%
60–70%
70–80%
80–90%
90–100%
Republican
50–60%
60–70%
70–80%

The 2018 United States House of Representatives elections in Washington were held on November 6, 2018, to elect the 10 U.S. representatives from the state of Washington, one from each of the state's 10 congressional districts. The elections coincided with other elections to the House of Representatives, elections to the United States Senate and various state and local elections. All nine incumbents seeking re-election were re-elected, but the Democratic Party won the open-seat in the 8th District previously held by a Republican, improving from a 6–4 margin to a 7–3 margin.

== Overview ==
Results of the 2018 United States House of Representatives elections in Washington by district:

District	Democratic		Republican		Others		Total		Result
District	Votes	%	Votes	%	Votes	%	Votes	%	Result
District 1	197,209	59.27%	135,534	40.73%	0	0.00%	332,743	100.0%	Democratic hold
District 2	210,187	71.29%	0	0.00%	84,646	28.71%	294,833	100.0%	Democratic hold
District 3	145,407	47.33%	161,819	52.67%	0	0.00%	307,226	100.0%	Republican hold
District 4	83,785	37.18%	141,551	62.82%	0	0.00%	225,336	100.0%	Republican hold
District 5	144,925	45.24%	175,422	54.76%	0	0.00%	320,347	100.0%	Republican hold
District 6	206,409	63.89%	116,677	36.11%	0	0.00%	323,086	100.0%	Democratic hold
District 7	329,800	83.56%	64,881	16.44%	0	0.00%	394,681	100.0%	Democratic hold
District 8	164,089	52.42%	148,968	47.58%	0	0.00%	313,057	100.0%	Democratic gain
District 9	240,567	100.00%	0	0.00%	0	0.00%	240,567	100.0%	Democratic hold
District 10	166,215	61.54%	103,860	38.46%	0	0.00%	270,075	100.0%	Democratic hold
Total	1,888,593	62.50%	1,048,712	34.70%	84,646	2.80%	3,021,951	100.0%	

== District 1 ==
2018 Washington's 1st congressional district election
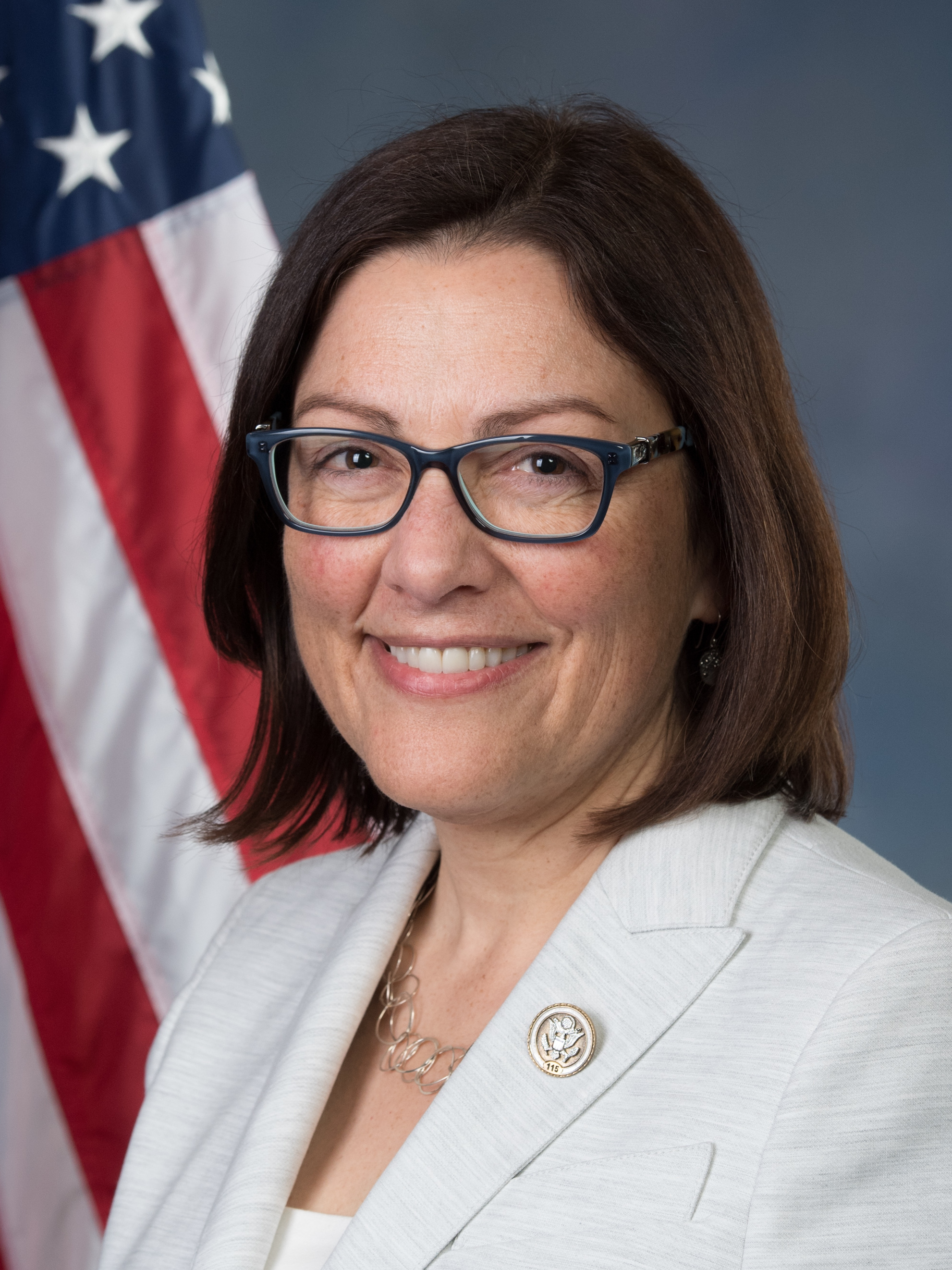

Nominee	Suzan DelBene	Jeffrey Beeler
Party	Democratic	Republican
Popular vote	197,209	135,534
Percentage	59.3%	40.7%
- County results DelBene: 50–60% 60–70% Beeler: 50–60%
U.S. Representative before election
Suzan DelBene
Democratic
Elected U.S. Representative
Suzan DelBene
Democratic

The 1st congressional district is located along the Puget Sound from the Canada–US border to King County. The district had a PVI of D+6. The incumbent was Democrat Suzan DelBene, who had represented the district since 2012. She was re-elected with 55% of the vote in 2016.

=== Primary election ===
==== Results ====
Results by county DelBene: 40–50% 50–60% 60–70%

Nonpartisan blanket primary results
Party	Candidate	Votes	%
Democratic	Suzan DelBene (incumbent)	106,107	59.3
Republican	Jeffrey Beeler	45,830	25.6
Republican	Scott Stafne	20,354	11.4
No party preference	Adam Pilskog	5,007	2.8
No party preference	Robert Mair	1,622	0.9
Total votes		178,920	100.0

=== General election ===
==== Predictions ====
Source	Ranking	As of
The Cook Political Report	Safe D	November 5, 2018
Inside Elections	Safe D	November 5, 2018
Sabato's Crystal Ball	Safe D	November 5, 2018
RCP	Safe D	November 5, 2018
Daily Kos	Safe D	November 5, 2018
538	Safe D	November 7, 2018
CNN	Safe D	October 31, 2018
Politico	Safe D	November 2, 2018

==== Results ====
2018 Washington's 1st congressional district election
Party	Candidate	Votes	%
Democratic	Suzan DelBene (incumbent)	197,209	59.3
Republican	Jeffrey Beeler	135,534	40.7
Total votes		332,743	100.0
Democratic hold			

==== By county ====
County results
County	Suzan DelBene Democratic		Jeffrey Beeler Republican		Margin		Total votes
County	#	%	#	%	#	%	Total votes
King (part)	93,249	69.45%	41,012	30.55%	52,237	38.91%	134,261
Skagit (part)	11,057	54.20%	9,344	45.80%	1,713	8.40%	20,401
Snohomish (part)	67,984	55.01%	55,610	44.99%	12,374	10.01%	123,594
Whatcom (part)	24,919	45.73%	29,568	54.27%	-4,649	-8.53%	54,487
Totals	197,209	59.27%	135,534	40.73%	61,675	18.54%	332,743

== District 2 ==
2018 Washington's 2nd congressional district election
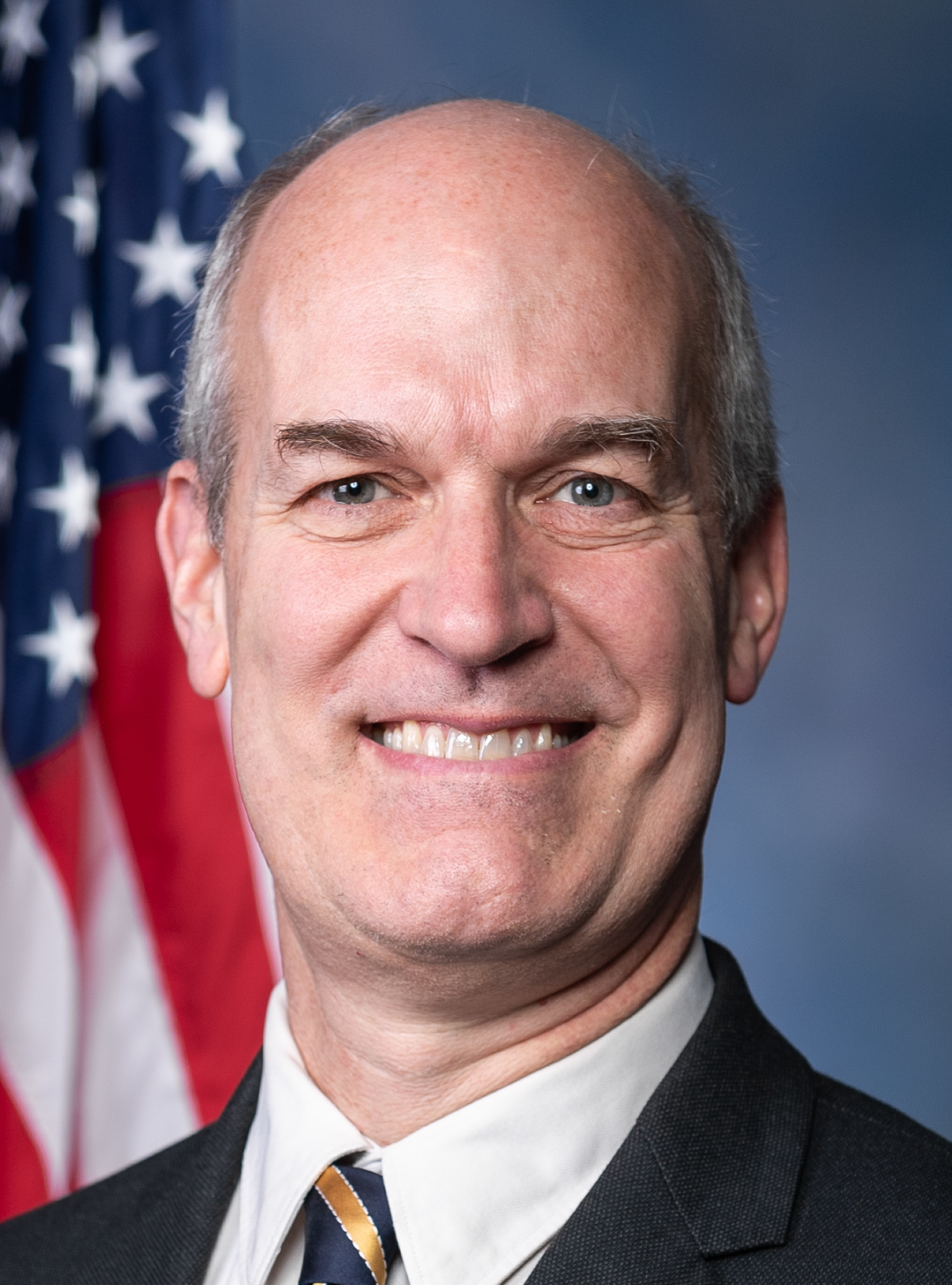

Nominee	Rick Larsen	Brian Luke
Party	Democratic	Libertarian
Popular vote	210,187	84,646
Percentage	71.3%	28.7%
- County results Larsen: 60–70% 70–80% 80–90%
U.S. Representative before election
Rick Larsen
Democratic
Elected U.S. Representative
Rick Larsen
Democratic

The 2nd congressional district includes all of Island and San Juan counties and neighboring areas on the mainland from Bellingham in the north to Lynnwood in the south. The district had a PVI of D+10. The incumbent was Democrat Rick Larsen, who had represented the district since 2001. He was re-elected with 64% of the vote in 2016.

=== Primary election ===
==== Results ====
Results by county Larsen: 60–70% 70–80%

Nonpartisan blanket primary results
Party	Candidate	Votes	%
Democratic	Rick Larsen (incumbent)	101,497	64.9
Libertarian	Brian Luke	12,320	7.9
Independent	Gary Franco	12,269	7.8
Democratic	Collin Richard Carlson	12,058	7.7
Moderate GOP	Uncle Mover	11,832	7.6
Green	Stonewall "Stoney" Jackson Bird	6,525	4.2
Total votes		156,501	100.0

=== General election ===
==== Predictions ====
Source	Ranking	As of
The Cook Political Report	Safe D	November 5, 2018
Inside Elections	Safe D	November 5, 2018
Sabato's Crystal Ball	Safe D	November 5, 2018
RCP	Safe D	November 5, 2018
Daily Kos	Safe D	November 5, 2018
538	Safe D	November 7, 2018
CNN	Safe D	October 31, 2018
Politico	Safe D	November 4, 2018

==== Results ====
2018 Washington's 2nd congressional district election
Party	Candidate	Votes	%
Democratic	Rick Larsen (incumbent)	210,187	71.3
Libertarian	Brian Luke	84,646	28.7
Total votes		294,833	100.0
Democratic hold			

==== By county ====
County results
County	Rick Larsen Democratic		Brian Luke Libertarian		Margin		Total votes
County	#	%	#	%	#	%	Total votes
Island	26,647	67.89%	12,602	32.11%	14,045	35.78%	39,249
San Juan	8,130	76.94%	2,436	23.06%	5,694	53.89%	10,566
Skagit (part)	20,993	66.79%	10,439	33.21%	10,554	33.58%	31,432
Snohomish (part)	112,031	69.31%	49,602	30.69%	62,429	38.62%	161,633
Whatcom (part)	42,386	81.59%	9,567	18.41%	32,819	63.17%	51,953
Totals	210,187	71.29%	84,646	28.71%	125,541	42.58%	294,833

== District 3 ==
2018 Washington's 3rd congressional district election
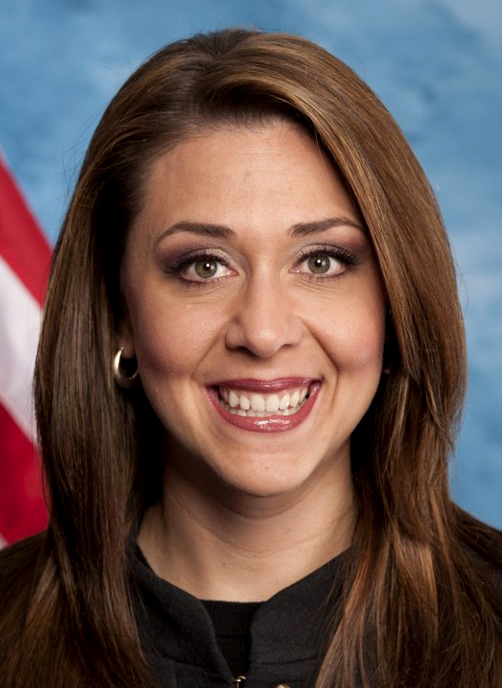

Nominee	Jaime Herrera Beutler	Carolyn Long
Party	Republican	Democratic
Popular vote	161,819	145,407
Percentage	52.7%	47.3%
- County results Beutler: 50–60% 60–70% Long: 50–60%
U.S. Representative before election
Jaime Herrera Beutler
Republican
Elected U.S. Representative
Jaime Herrera Beutler
Republican

The 3rd congressional district encompasses the southernmost portion of western and central Washington. It includes the counties of Lewis, Pacific, Wahkiakum, Cowlitz, Clark, Skamania, and Klickitat, and a small sliver of southern Thurston county. The district had a PVI of R+4. The incumbent was Republican Jaime Herrera Beutler, who had represented the district since 2011. She was re-elected with 62% of the vote in 2016.

=== Primary election ===
==== Results ====
Results by county Herrera Beutler: 40–50% 50–60%; Long: 30–40%

Nonpartisan blanket primary results
Party	Candidate	Votes	%
Republican	Jaime Herrera Beutler (incumbent)	68,961	42.1
Democratic	Carolyn Long	57,798	35.3
Democratic	David McDevitt	13,124	8.0
Republican	Earl Bowerman	9,018	5.5
Democratic	Dorothy Gasque	7,983	4.9
Republican	Michael Cortney	5,528	3.4
Democratic	Martin Hash	1,498	0.9
Total votes		163,910	100.0

=== General election ===
==== Predictions ====
Source	Ranking	As of
The Cook Political Report	Lean R	November 5, 2018
Inside Elections	Likely R	November 5, 2018
Sabato's Crystal Ball	Lean R	November 5, 2018
RCP	Lean R	November 5, 2018
Daily Kos	Lean R	November 5, 2018
538	Lean R	November 7, 2018

==== Polling ====
Poll source	Date(s) administered	Sample size	Margin of error	Jaime Herrera Beutler (R)	Carolyn Long (D)	Undecided
NYT Upshot/Siena College	October 14–19, 2018	497	± 4.6%	48%	41%	12%
Lake Research Partners (D-Long)	October 9–11, 2018	500	± 4.9%	43%	45%	–
Lake Research Partners (D-Long)	June 14–18, 2018	500	± 4.4%	42%	37%	20%
Lake Research Partners (D-Long)	March 8–12, 2018	400	± 4.9%	49%	29%	21%

==== Endorsements ====
Carolyn Long (D)

Federal officials

- Barack Obama, former president of the United States (2009–2017)

==== Results ====
2018 Washington's 3rd congressional district election
Party	Candidate	Votes	%
Republican	Jaime Herrera Beutler (incumbent)	161,819	52.7
Democratic	Carolyn Long	145,407	47.3
Total votes		307,226	100.0
Republican hold			

==== By county ====
County results
County	Jaime Herrera Beutler Republican		Carolyn Long Democratic		Margin		Total votes
County	#	%	#	%	#	%	Total votes
Clark	94,930	48.88%	99,296	51.12%	-4,366	-2.25%	194,226
Cowlitz	24,930	56.15%	19,472	43.85%	5,458	12.29%	44,402
Klickitat	5,929	55.25%	4,802	44.75%	1,127	10.50%	10,731
Lewis	22,875	67.65%	10,939	32.35%	11,936	35.30%	33,814
Pacific	5,456	50.55%	5,337	49.45%	119	1.10%	10,793
Skamania	3,066	54.88%	2,521	45.12%	545	9.75%	5,587
Thurston (part)	3,217	61.45%	2,018	38.55%	1,199	22.90%	5,235
Wahkiakum	1,416	58.08%	1,022	41.92%	394	16.16%	2,438
Totals	161,819	52.67%	145,407	47.33%	16,412	5.34%	307,226

== District 4 ==
2018 Washington's 4th congressional district election
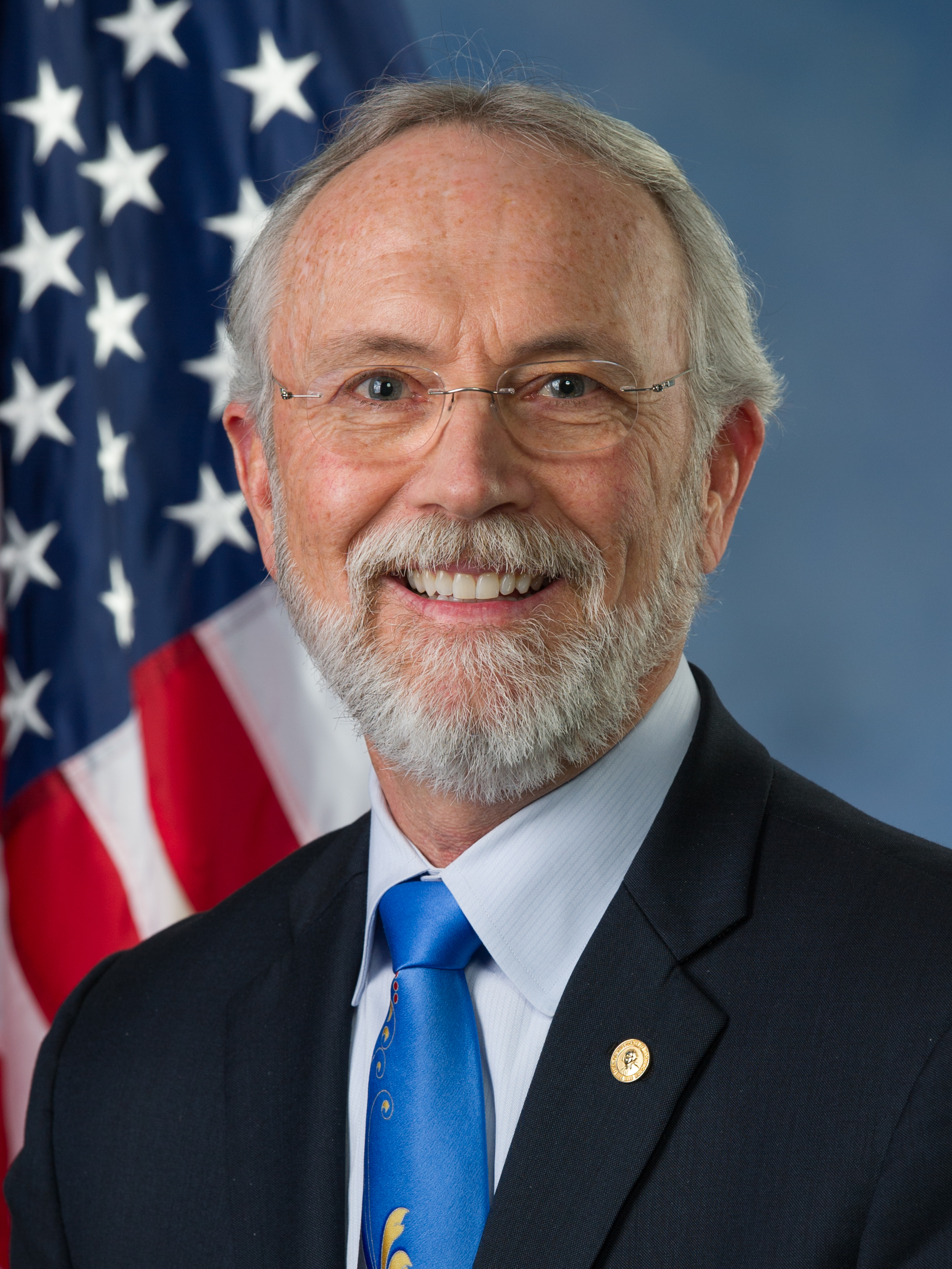

Nominee	Dan Newhouse	Christine Brown
Party	Republican	Democratic
Popular vote	141,551	83,785
Percentage	62.8%	37.2%
- County results Newhouse: 50–60% 60–70% 70–80%
U.S. Representative before election
Dan Newhouse
Republican
Elected U.S. Representative
Dan Newhouse
Republican

The 4th congressional district is located in central Washington, covering the counties of, Douglas, Okanogan, Grant, Yakima, Franklin, Benton, and Adams. The district is dominated by the Yakima and Tri-Cities areas. The district had a PVI of R+13. The incumbent was Republican Dan Newhouse, who had represented the district since 2015. He was re-elected with 58% of the vote in 2016.

=== Primary election ===
==== Results ====
Results by county Newhouse: 50–60% 60–70% 70–80%

Nonpartisan blanket primary results
Party	Candidate	Votes	%
Republican	Dan Newhouse (incumbent)	77,203	63.2
Democratic	Christine Brown	44,868	36.8
Total votes		122,071	100.0

=== General election ===
==== Predictions ====
Source	Ranking	As of
The Cook Political Report	Safe R	November 5, 2018
Inside Elections	Safe R	November 5, 2018
Sabato's Crystal Ball	Safe R	November 5, 2018
RCP	Safe R	November 5, 2018
Daily Kos	Safe R	November 5, 2018
538	Safe R	November 7, 2018
CNN	Safe R	October 31, 2018
Politico	Safe R	November 4, 2018

==== Results ====
2018 Washington's 4th congressional district election
Party	Candidate	Votes	%
Republican	Dan Newhouse (incumbent)	141,551	62.8
Democratic	Christine Brown	83,785	37.2
Total votes		225,336	100.0
Republican hold			

==== By county ====
County results
County	Dan Newhouse Republican		Christine Brown Democratic		Margin		Total votes
County	#	%	#	%	#	%	Total votes
Adams	3,116	73.84%	1,104	26.16%	2,012	47.68%	4,220
Benton	46,618	62.23%	28,289	37.77%	18,329	24.47%	74,907
Douglas (part)	5,833	69.44%	2,567	30.56%	3,266	38.88%	8,400
Franklin	13,376	60.13%	8,870	39.87%	4,506	20.26%	22,246
Grant	19,197	72.75%	7,189	27.25%	12,008	45.51%	26,386
Okanogan	10,084	60.60%	6,555	39.40%	3,529	21.21%	16,639
Walla Walla (part)	1,551	73.65%	555	26.35%	996	47.29%	2,106
Yakima	41,776	59.31%	28,656	40.69%	13,120	18.63%	70,432
Totals	141,551	62.82%	83,785	37.18%	57,766	25.64%	225,336

== District 5 ==
2018 Washington's 5th congressional district election
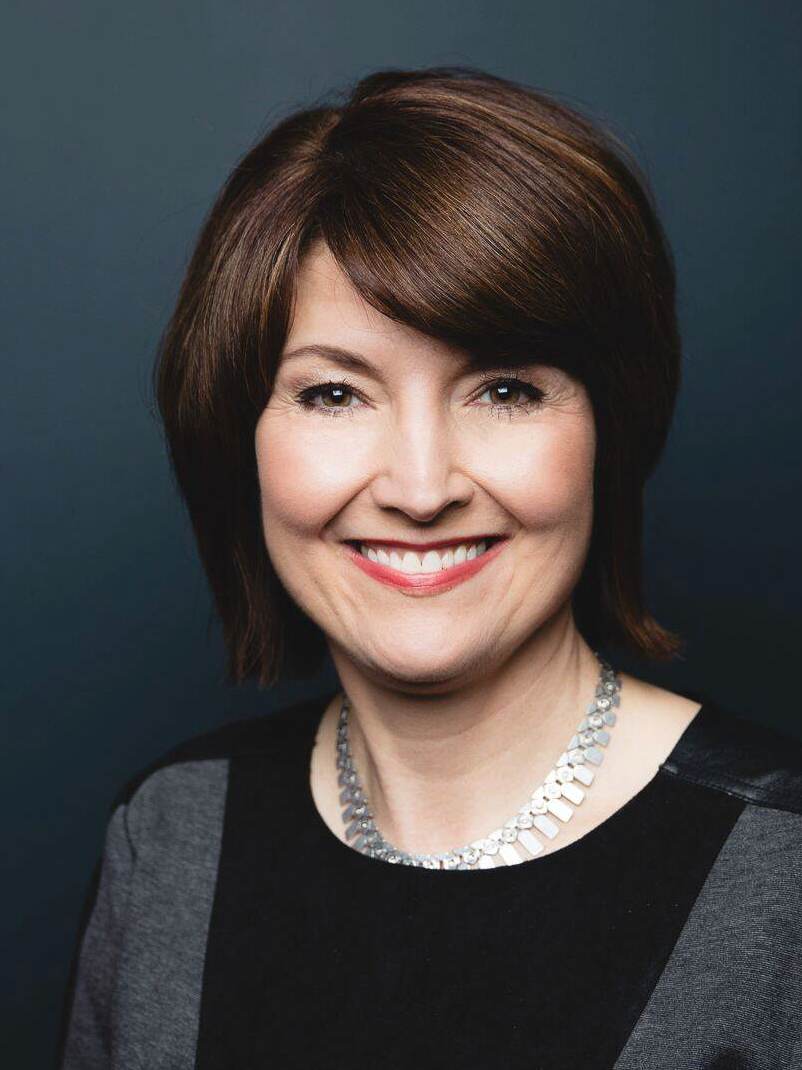

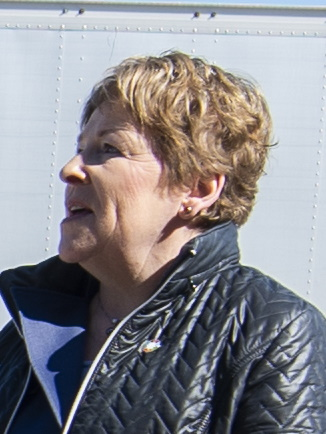
Nominee	Cathy McMorris Rodgers	Lisa Brown
Party	Republican	Democratic
Popular vote	175,422	144,925
Percentage	54.8%	45.2%
- County results Rodgers: 50–60% 60–70% 70–80% Brown: 50–60%
U.S. Representative before election
Cathy McMorris Rodgers
Republican
Elected U.S. Representative
Cathy McMorris Rodgers
Republican

The 5th congressional district is located in Eastern Washington and includes the counties of Ferry, Stevens, Pend Oreille, Lincoln, Spokane, Whitman, Walla Walla, Columbia, Garfield, and Asotin. It is centered on Spokane, the state's second largest city. The district had a PVI of R+8. The incumbent was Republican Cathy McMorris Rodgers, who had represented the district since 2005. She was re-elected with 60% of the vote in 2016.

=== Primary election ===
==== Results ====
Results by county McMorris Rodgers: 40–50% 50–60% 60–70% 70–80%; Brown: 40–50%

Nonpartisan blanket primary results
Party	Candidate	Votes	%
Republican	Cathy McMorris Rodgers (incumbent)	99,689	49.3
Democratic	Lisa Brown	91,738	45.4
Trump Populist	Dave Saulibio	4,845	2.4
Republican	Jered Gavin Bonneau	4,453	2.2
Republican	Kari Olavi Ilonummi	1,507	0.7
Total votes		202,232	100.0

=== General election ===
==== Predictions ====
Source	Ranking	As of
The Cook Political Report	Lean R	November 5, 2018
Inside Elections	Likely R	November 5, 2018
Sabato's Crystal Ball	Lean R	November 5, 2018
RCP	Lean R	November 5, 2018
Daily Kos	Lean R	November 5, 2018
538	Likely R	November 7, 2018

==== Debate ====
2018 Washington's 5th congressional district election debate
No.	Date	Host	Moderator	Link	Republican	Democratic
Key: P Participant A Absent N Not invited I Invited W Withdrawn						
Key: P Participant A Absent N Not invited I Invited W Withdrawn					Cathy McMorris Rodgers	Lisa Brown
1	Oct. 24, 2018	Northwest Public Broadcasting; Walla Walla Valley Chamber of Commerce	Bertha Clayton		P	P

==== Endorsements ====
Cathy McMorris Rodgers (R)

U.S. executive branch officials

- Donald Trump, 45th president of the United States
Lisa Brown (D)

U.S. executive branch officials

- Barack Obama, former president of the United States (2009–2017)

==== Polling ====
Poll source	Date(s) administered	Sample size	Margin of error	Cathy McMorris Rodgers (R)	Lisa Brown (D)	Other	Undecided
FM3 Research (D-Brown)	September 16–20, 2018	521	± 4.3%	49%	46%	—	5%
Public Policy Polling (D)	April 16–17, 2018	689	± 3.7%	48%	45%	—	7%
Elway Research	April 4–7, 2018	403	± 5.0%	44%	38%	3%	16%
DCCC (D)	February 3, 2018	414	± 4.8%	47%	43%	—	—

==== Results ====
2018 Washington's 5th congressional district election
Party	Candidate	Votes	%
Republican	Cathy McMorris Rodgers (incumbent)	175,422	54.8
Democratic	Lisa Brown	144,925	45.2
Total votes		320,347	100.0
Republican hold			

==== By county ====
County results
County	Cathy McMorris Rodgers Republican		Lisa Brown Democratic		Margin		Total votes
County	#	%	#	%	#	%	Total votes
Asotin	5,527	60.76%	3,570	39.24%	1,957	21.51%	9,097
Columbia	1,572	71.20%	636	28.80%	936	42.39%	2,208
Ferry	2,272	64.84%	1,232	35.16%	1,040	29.68%	3,504
Garfield	1,010	75.20%	333	24.80%	677	50.41%	1,343
Lincoln	4,215	75.58%	1,362	24.42%	2,853	51.16%	5,577
Pend Oreille	4,496	65.67%	2,350	34.33%	2,146	31.35%	6,846
Spokane	119,770	52.42%	108,697	47.58%	11,073	4.85%	228,467
Stevens	15,586	69.13%	6,961	30.87%	8,625	38.25%	22,547
Walla Walla (part)	12,689	53.95%	10,831	46.05%	1,858	7.90%	23,520
Whitman	8,285	48.06%	8,953	51.94%	-668	-3.88%	17,238
Totals	175,422	54.76%	144,925	45.24%	30,497	9.52%	320,347

== District 6 ==
2018 Washington's 6th congressional district election
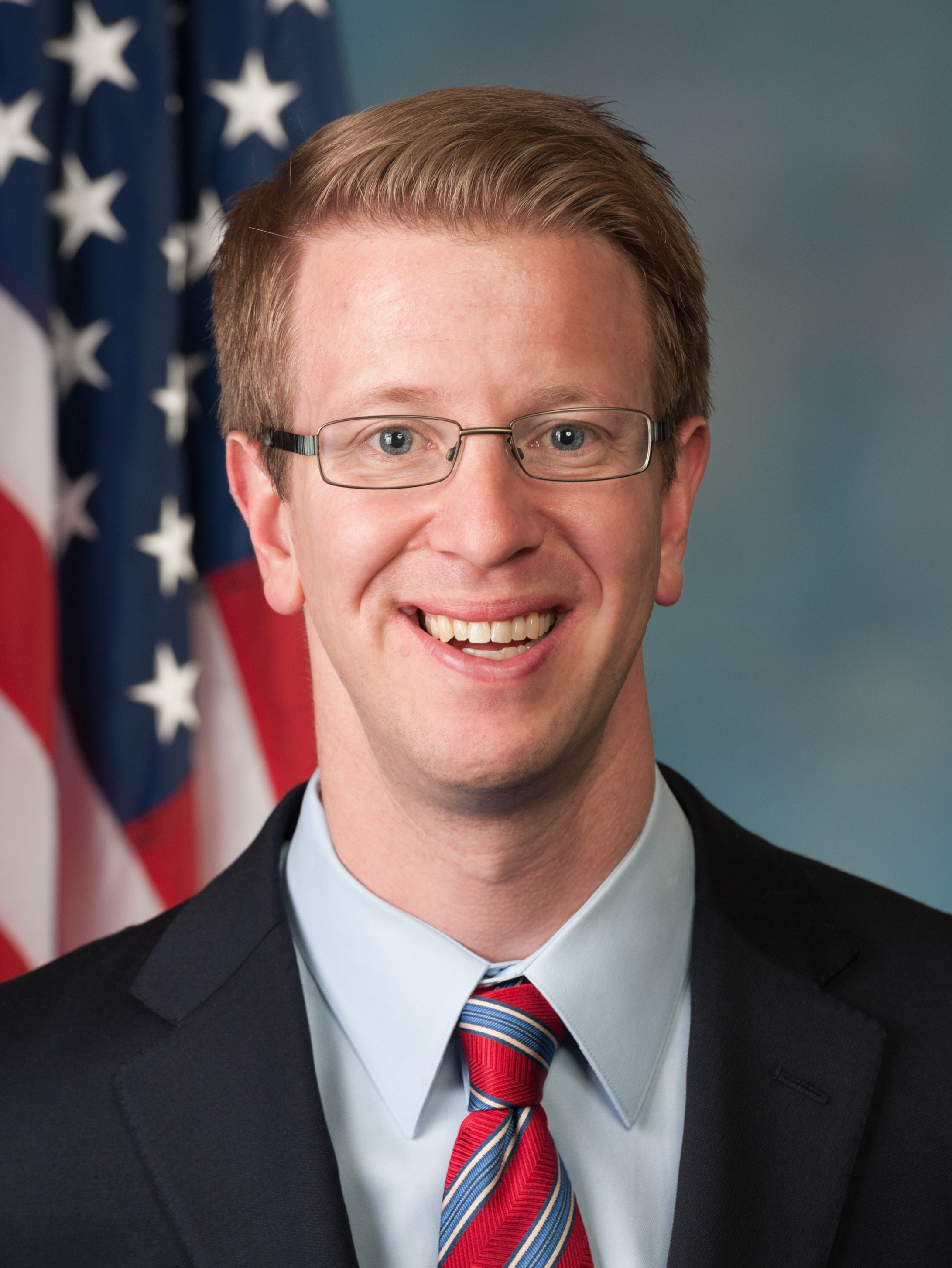

Nominee	Derek Kilmer	Douglas Dightman
Party	Democratic	Republican
Popular vote	206,409	116,677
Percentage	63.9%	36.1%
- County results Kilmer: 50–60% 60–70% 70–80%
U.S. Representative before election
Derek Kilmer
Democratic
Elected U.S. Representative
Derek Kilmer
Democratic

The 6th congressional district includes the Olympic Peninsula, most of the Kitsap Peninsula, and most of the city of Tacoma. The district had a PVI of D+6. The incumbent was Democrat Derek Kilmer, who had represented the district since 2013. He was re-elected with 62% of the vote in 2016.

=== Primary election ===
==== Results ====
Results by county Kilmer: 50–60% 60–70%

Nonpartisan blanket primary results
Party	Candidate	Votes	%
Democratic	Derek Kilmer (incumbent)	117,848	63.5
Republican	Douglas Dightman	60,651	32.7
Progressive	Tyler Myles Vega	7,080	3.8
Total votes		185,579	100.0

=== General election ===
==== Predictions ====
Source	Ranking	As of
The Cook Political Report	Safe D	November 5, 2018
Inside Elections	Safe D	November 5, 2018
Sabato's Crystal Ball	Safe D	November 5, 2018
RCP	Safe D	November 5, 2018
Daily Kos	Safe D	November 5, 2018
538	Safe D	November 7, 2018
CNN	Safe D	October 31, 2018
Politico	Safe D	November 4, 2018

==== Results ====
2018 Washington's 6th congressional district election
Party	Candidate	Votes	%
Democratic	Derek Kilmer (incumbent)	206,409	63.9
Republican	Douglas Dightman	116,677	36.1
Total votes		323,086	100.0
Democratic hold			

==== By county ====
County results
County	Derek Kilmer Democratic		Douglas Dightman Republican		Margin		Total votes
County	#	%	#	%	#	%	Total votes
Clallam	22,633	57.76%	16,551	42.24%	6,082	15.52%	39,184
Grays Harbor	15,530	55.12%	12,646	44.88%	2,884	10.24%	28,176
Jefferson	15,076	72.95%	5,591	27.05%	9,485	45.89%	20,667
Kitsap	76,746	64.29%	42,628	35.71%	34,118	28.58%	119,374
Mason (part)	11,267	52.78%	10,081	47.22%	1,186	5.56%	21,348
Pierce (part)	65,157	69.07%	29,180	30.93%	35,977	38.14%	94,337
Totals	206,409	63.89%	116,677	36.11%	89,732	27.77%	323,086

== District 7 ==
2018 Washington's 7th congressional district election
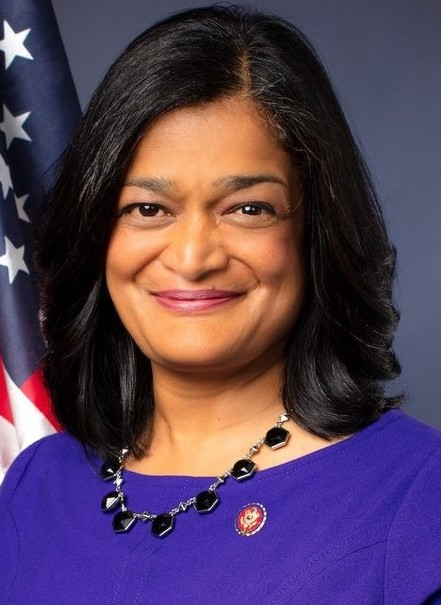

Nominee	Pramila Jayapal	Craig Keller
Party	Democratic	Republican
Popular vote	329,800	64,881
Percentage	83.6%	16.4%
- County results Jayapal: 60–70% 80–90%
U.S. Representative before election
Pramila Jayapal
Democratic
Elected U.S. Representative
Pramila Jayapal
Democratic

The 7th congressional district includes most of Seattle, all of Vashon Island, Edmonds, Shoreline, Kenmore, and parts of Burien and Normandy Park. The district had a PVI of D+33. The incumbent was Democrat Pramila Jayapal, who had represented the district since 2017. She was elected with 56% of the vote in 2016, to replace retiring Democratic representative Jim McDermott.

=== Primary election ===
==== Results ====
Results by county Jayapal: 60–70% 80–90%

Nonpartisan blanket primary results
Party	Candidate	Votes	%
Democratic	Pramila Jayapal (incumbent)	189,175	82.7
Republican	Craig Keller	39,657	17.3
Total votes		228,832	100.0

=== General election ===
==== Predictions ====
Source	Ranking	As of
The Cook Political Report	Safe D	November 5, 2018
Inside Elections	Safe D	November 5, 2018
Sabato's Crystal Ball	Safe D	November 5, 2018
RCP	Safe D	November 5, 2018
Daily Kos	Safe D	November 5, 2018
538	Safe D	November 7, 2018
CNN	Safe D	October 31, 2018
Politico	Safe D	November 4, 2018

==== Results ====
2018 Washington's 7th congressional district election
Party	Candidate	Votes	%
Democratic	Pramila Jayapal (incumbent)	329,800	83.6
Republican	Craig Keller	64,881	16.4
Total votes		394,681	100.0
Democratic hold			

==== By county ====
County results
County	Pramila Jayapal Democratic		Craig Keller Republican		Margin		Total votes
County	#	%	#	%	#	%	Total votes
King (part)	312,252	84.74%	56,217	15.26%	256,035	69.49%	368,469
Snohomish (part)	17,548	66.95%	8,664	33.05%	8,884	33.89%	26,212
Totals	329,800	83.56%	64,881	16.44%	264,919	67.12%	394,681

== District 8 ==
2018 Washington's 8th congressional district election
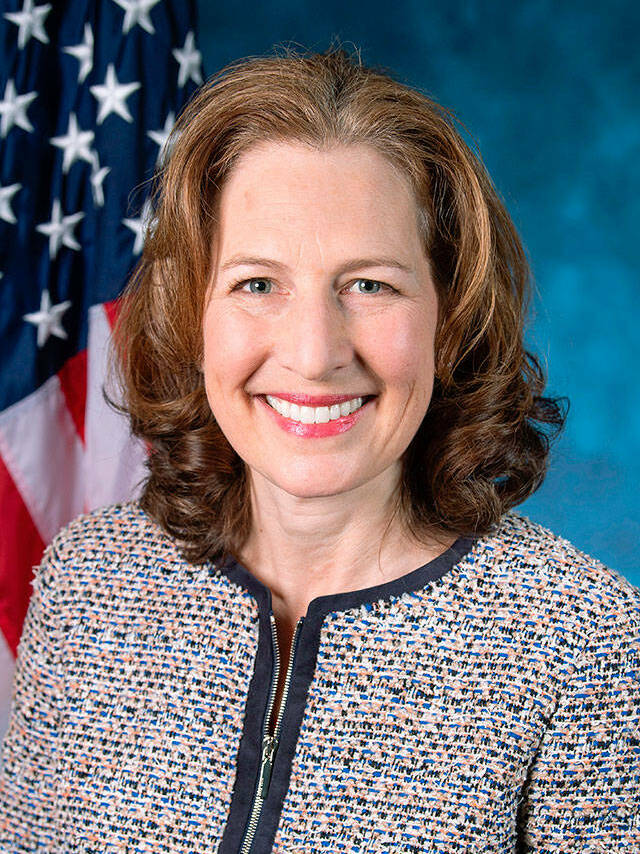

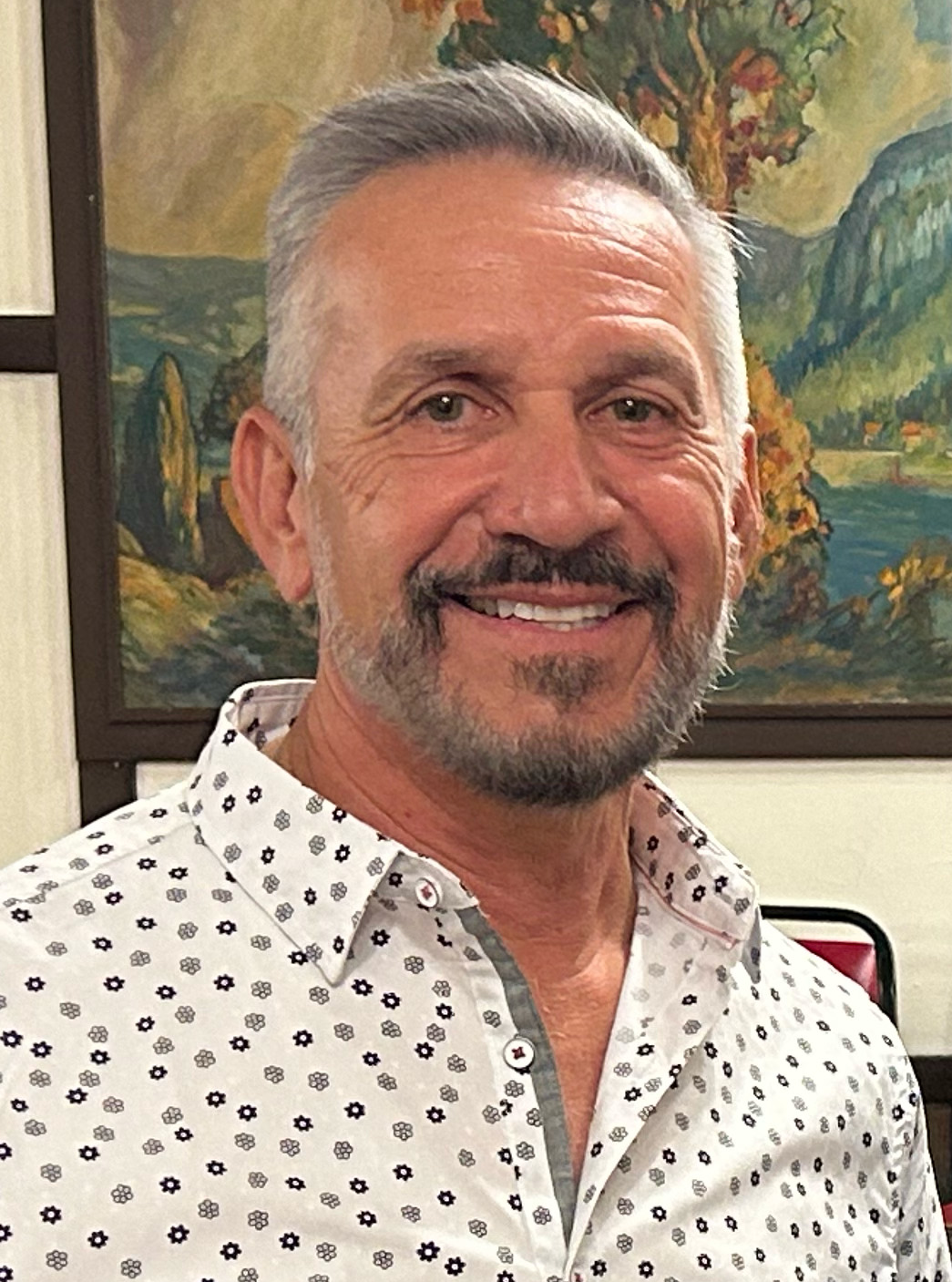
Nominee	Kim Schrier	Dino Rossi
Party	Democratic	Republican
Popular vote	164,089	148,968
Percentage	52.4%	47.6%
- County results Schrier: 50–60% Rossi: 50–60%
U.S. Representative before election
Dave Reichert
Republican
Elected U.S. Representative
Kim Schrier
Democratic

The 8th congressional district includes the eastern portions of King and Pierce counties and crosses the Cascade mountains to include Chelan and Kittitas counties. The population centers on the west side of the mountains include the exurban communities of Sammamish, Issaquah, and Auburn. On the east side, the 8th's population centers are rural communities Wenatchee, Leavenworth, and Ellensburg. The district had a PVI of EVEN.

Dave Reichert's retirement made this the only open seat in Washington in 2018, as well as the only seat to change party hands.

=== Results ===
Results by county Rossi: 30–40% 40–50% 50–60%

Nonpartisan blanket primary results
Party	Candidate	Votes	%
Republican	Dino Rossi	73,288	43.1
Democratic	Kim Schrier	31,837	18.7
Democratic	Jason Rittereiser	30,708	18.1
Democratic	Shannon Hader	21,317	12.5
Republican	Jack Hughes-Hageman	4,270	2.5
Republican	Gordon Allen Pross	2,081	1.2
Democratic	Tom Cramer	1,468	0.9
Independent Centrist	Bill Grassie	1,163	0.7
Libertarian	Richard Travis Reyes	1,154	0.7
Independent	Keith Arnold	1,090	0.6
Neither Major Party	Patrick Dillon	898	0.5
No party preference	Todd Mahaffey	673	0.4
Total votes		169,947	100.0

=== General election ===
==== Predictions ====
Source	Ranking	As of
The Cook Political Report	Lean D (flip)	November 5, 2018
Inside Elections	Tossup	November 5, 2018
Sabato's Crystal Ball	Lean D (flip)	November 5, 2018
RCP	Tossup	November 5, 2018
Daily Kos	Tossup	November 5, 2018
538	Lean D (flip)	November 7, 2018

==== Endorsements ====
Dino Rossi (R)

Organizations

- Club for Growth PAC

Newspapers

- The Seattle Times
Kim Schrier (D)

U.S. executive branch officials

- Barack Obama, former president of the United States (2009–2017)

==== Debate ====
2018 Washington's 8th congressional district debate
No.	Date	Host	Moderator	Link	Republican	Democratic
Key: P Participant A Absent N Not invited I Invited W Withdrawn						
Key: P Participant A Absent N Not invited I Invited W Withdrawn					Dino Rossi	Kim Schrier
1	Oct. 17, 2018	Associated Students of Central Washington University; Central Washington University; Ellensburg Daily Record; Kittitas County Chamber of Commerce; Cle Elum-Roslyn, Easton, Ellensburg, Kittitas & Thorp school districts			P	P

==== Polling ====
Poll source	Date(s) administered	Sample size	Margin of error	Dino Rossi (R)	Kim Schrier (D)	Undecided
NYT Upshot/Siena College	October 30 – November 4, 2018	477	± 4.8%	45%	48%	8%
Elway Research	October 4–9, 2018	400	± 5.0%	49%	39%	12%
NYT Upshot/Siena College	September 24–26, 2018	505	± 4.6%	45%	46%	9%
GBA Strategies (D)	April 18–22, 2018	300	± 5.7%	51%	45%	–

Hypothetical polling

Dino Rossi vs. generic Democrat

Poll source	Date(s) administered	Sample size	Margin of error	Dino Rossi (R)	Generic Democrat	Other	Undecided
DCCC (D)	March 23, 2018	–	–	46%	44%	–	–
Public Policy Polling (D)	February 12–13, 2018	613	± 4.0%	43%	44%	–	13%
Public Policy Polling (D)	October 6–8, 2017	753	± 3.6%	42%	43%	–	15%

Dino Rossi vs. Jason Rittereiser

Poll source	Date(s) administered	Sample size	Margin of error	Dino Rossi (R)	Jason Rittereiser (D)	Undecided
GBA Strategies (D)	April 18–22, 2018	900	± 5.7%	52%	43%	–

Dino Rossi vs. Shannon Hader

Poll source	Date(s) administered	Sample size	Margin of error	Dino Rossi (R)	Shannon Hader (D)	Undecided
GBA Strategies (D)	April 18–22, 2018	900	± 5.7%	51%	45%	–

==== Results ====
2018 Washington's 8th congressional district election
Party	Candidate	Votes	%
Democratic	Kim Schrier	164,089	52.4
Republican	Dino Rossi	148,968	47.6
Total votes		313,057	100.0
Democratic gain from Republican			

==== By county ====
County results
County	Dino Rossi Republican		Kim Schrier Democratic		Margin		Total votes
County	#	%	#	%	#	%	Total votes
Chelan	17,869	54.53%	14,903	45.47%	-2,966	-9.05%	32,772
Douglas (part)	3,799	59.29%	2,608	40.71%	-1,191	-18.59%	6,407
King (part)	77,306	41.93%	107,064	58.07%	29,758	16.14%	184,370
Kittitas	10,458	54.59%	8,700	45.41%	-1,758	-9.18%	19,158
Pierce (part)	39,536	56.20%	30,814	43.80%	-8,722	-12.40%	70,350
Totals	148,968	47.58%	164,089	52.42%	15,121	4.83%	313,057

== District 9 ==
2018 Washington's 9th congressional district election
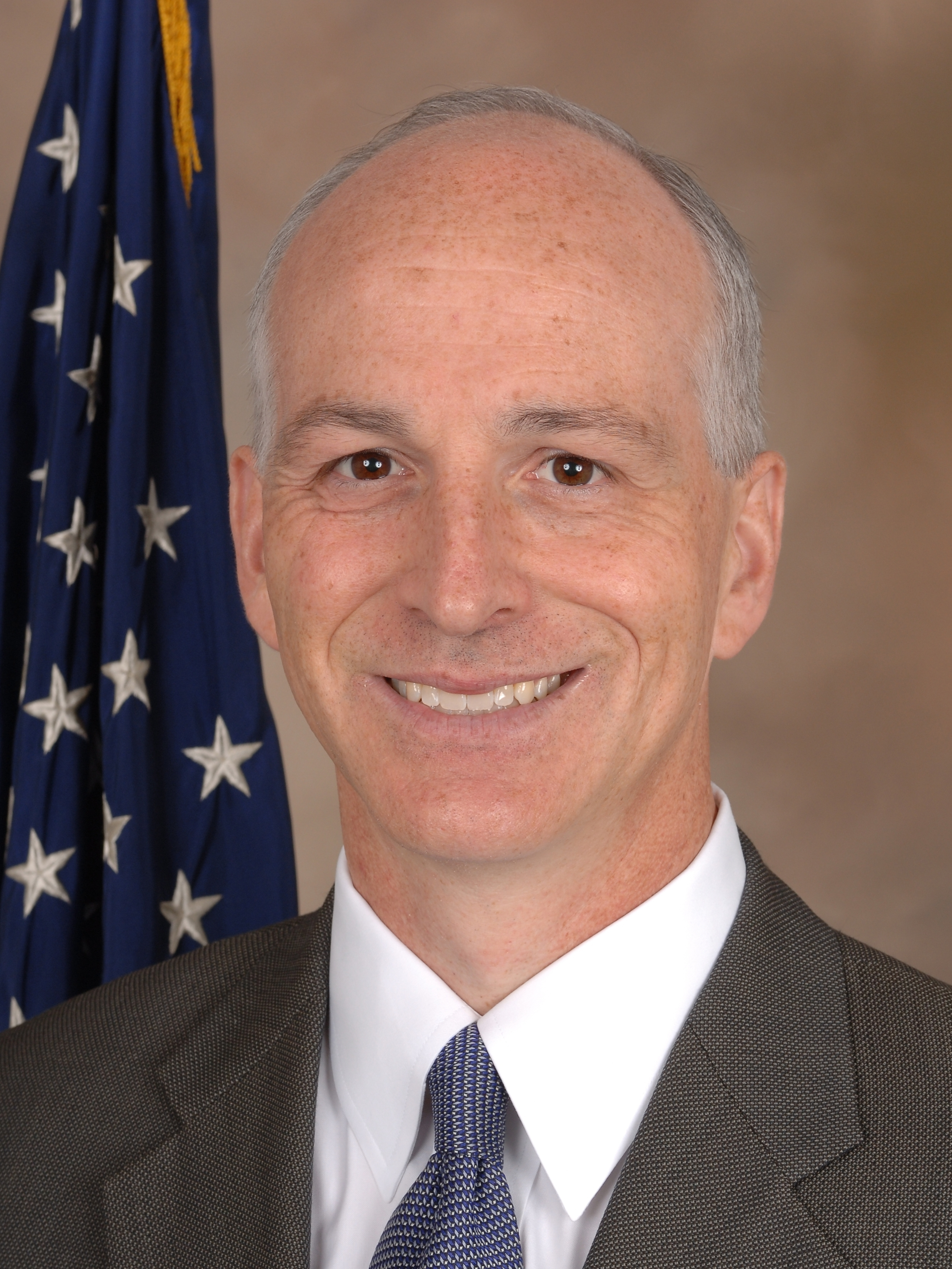

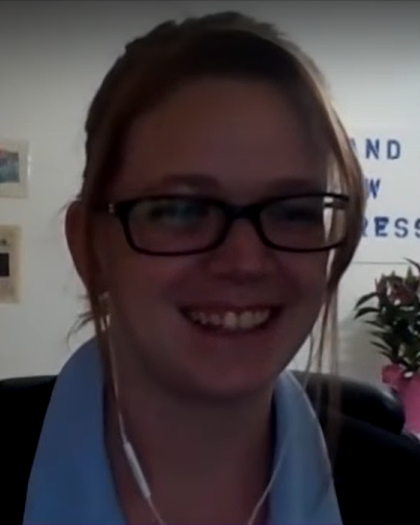
Nominee	Adam Smith	Sarah Smith
Party	Democratic	Democratic
Popular vote	163,345	77,222
Percentage	67.9%	32.1%
- County results A. Smith: 60–70% 70–80%
U.S. Representative before election
Adam Smith
Democratic
Elected U.S. Representative
Adam Smith
Democratic

The 9th congressional district encompasses a long, somewhat narrow area in western Washington through the densely populated central Puget Sound region, from Tacoma in the south to Bellevue in the north. The district had a PVI of D+21. The incumbent was Democrat Adam Smith, who had represented the district since 1997. He was re-elected with 73% of the vote in 2016. The 9th was the only district in Washington to have Democrats win both spots in the blanket primary, with 48% of the vote going to the Adam Smith, the incumbent, 27% going to Sarah Smith, a progressive challenger, and 25% going to Doug Blaser, the sole Republican candidate. Incumbent Adam Smith won the general election soundly, receiving 68% of the vote.

=== Primary election ===
==== Results ====
Results by county Smith: 40–50%

Nonpartisan blanket primary results
Party	Candidate	Votes	%
Democratic	Adam Smith (incumbent)	71,035	48.4
Democratic	Sarah Smith	39,409	26.9
Republican	Doug Basler	36,254	24.7
Total votes		146,698	100.0

=== General election ===
==== Predictions ====
Source	Ranking	As of
The Cook Political Report	Safe D	November 5, 2018
Inside Elections	Safe D	November 5, 2018
Sabato's Crystal Ball	Safe D	November 5, 2018
RCP	Safe D	November 5, 2018
Daily Kos	Safe D	November 5, 2018
538	Safe D	November 7, 2018
CNN	Safe D	October 31, 2018
Politico	Safe D	November 4, 2018

==== Results ====
2018 Washington's 9th congressional district election
Party	Candidate	Votes	%
Democratic	Adam Smith (incumbent)	163,345	67.9
Democratic	Sarah Smith	77,222	32.1
Total votes		240,567	100.0
Democratic hold			

==== By county ====
County results
County	Adam Smith Democratic		Sarah Smith Democratic		Margin		Total votes
County	#	%	#	%	#	%	Total votes
King (part)	157,334	67.72%	75,013	32.28%	82,321	35.43%	232,347
Pierce (part)	6,011	73.13%	2,209	26.87%	3,802	46.25%	8,220
Totals	163,345	67.90%	77,222	32.10%	86,123	35.80%	240,567

== District 10 ==
2018 Washington's 10th congressional district election
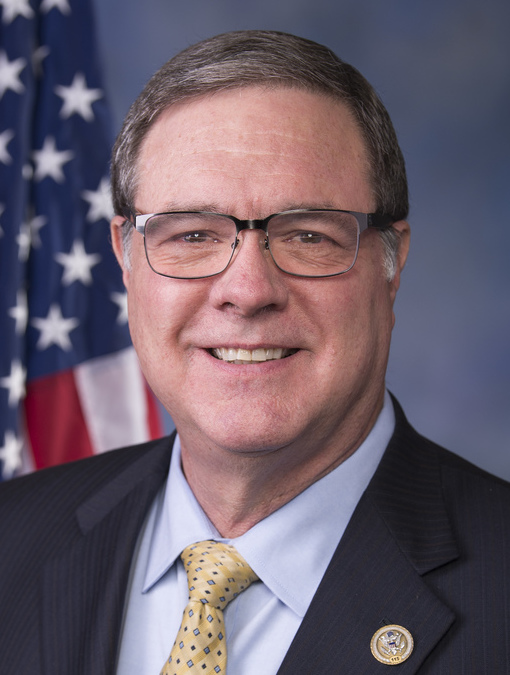

Nominee	Denny Heck	Joseph Brumbles
Party	Democratic	Republican
Popular vote	166,215	103,860
Percentage	61.5%	38.5%
- County results Heck: 50–60% 60–70%
U.S. Representative before election
Denny Heck
Democratic
Elected U.S. Representative
Denny Heck
Democratic

The 10th congressional district encompasses the state capital of Olympia and surrounding areas. The district had a PVI of D+5. The incumbent was Democrat Denny Heck, who had represented the district since 2013. He was re-elected with 59% of the vote in 2016.

=== Primary election ===
==== Results ====
Results by county Heck: 50–60% 60–70%

Nonpartisan blanket primary results
Party	Candidate	Votes	%
Democratic	Denny Heck (incumbent)	82,552	58.2
Republican	Joseph Brumbles	45,270	31.9
Independent Progressive	Tamborine Borrelli	7,997	5.6
Independent Centrist	Nancy Dailey Slotnick	6,127	4.3
Total votes		141,946	100.0

=== General election ===
==== Predictions ====
Source	Ranking	As of
The Cook Political Report	Safe D	November 5, 2018
Inside Elections	Safe D	November 5, 2018
Sabato's Crystal Ball	Safe D	November 5, 2018
RCP	Safe D	November 5, 2018
Daily Kos	Safe D	November 5, 2018
538	Safe D	November 7, 2018
CNN	Safe D	October 31, 2018
Politico	Safe D	November 4, 2018

==== Results ====
2018 Washington's 10th congressional district election
Party	Candidate	Votes	%
Democratic	Denny Heck (incumbent)	166,215	61.5
Republican	Joseph Brumbles	103,860	38.5
Total votes		270,075	100.0
Democratic hold			

==== By county ====
County results
County	Denny Heck Democratic		Joseph Brumbles Republican		Margin		Total votes
County	#	%	#	%	#	%	Total votes
Mason (part)	3,567	58.55%	2,525	41.45%	1,042	17.10%	6,092
Pierce (part)	86,794	58.96%	60,405	41.04%	26,389	17.93%	147,199
Thurston (part)	75,854	64.95%	40,930	35.05%	34,924	29.90%	116,784
Totals	166,215	61.54%	103,860	38.46%	62,355	23.09%	270,075
