= Washington's 8th congressional district =

U.S. House district for Washington

Coordinates: 47°18′N 122°06′W

- Interactive map of district boundaries since January 3, 2023 (King County highlighted, where most of the district's population resides)
- Representative: Kim Schrier; D–Sammamish
- Area: 7,359.70 mi^{2} (19,061.5 km^{2})
- Distribution: 83.4% urban; 16.6% rural
- Population (2025): 786,521
- Median household income: $135,827
- Ethnicity: 69.1% White; 10.5% Hispanic; 9.8% Asian; 6.6% Two or more races; 2.0% Black; 1.9% other
- Cook PVI: D+3

Washington's 8th congressional district is a district for the United States House of Representatives located in western Washington State. It includes the eastern portions of King, Pierce, and Snohomish counties, and crosses the Cascade Range to include Chelan and Kittitas counties, as well as a precinct in East Wenatchee in Douglas County. The district's western part includes the suburban communities of Sammamish, Issaquah, and Maple Valley but does not include Seattle and Tacoma's more immediate suburbs. On its east side, the 8th's population centers include the rural communities Wenatchee, Leavenworth, and Ellensburg. It is currently represented in the U.S. House of Representatives by Democrat Kim Schrier, who was elected to the seat in 2018.

== Recent election results from statewide races ==
| Year | Office | Results |
|---|---|---|
| 2008 | President | Obama 52% - 47% |
| 2010 | Senate | Rossi 55% - 45% |
| 2012 | President | Obama 51% - 49% |
| 2016 | President | Clinton 48% - 44% |
| 2016 | Senate | Murray 51% - 49% |
| 2016 | Governor | Bryant 54% - 46% |
| 2016 | Lt. Governor | McClendon 54% - 46% |
| 2016 | Secretary of State | Wyman 63% - 37% |
| 2016 | Auditor | Miloscia 56% - 44% |
| 2018 | Senate | Cantwell 51% - 49% |
| 2020 | President | Biden 52% - 45% |
| 2020 | Governor | Culp 51% - 49% |
| 2020 | Secretary of State | Wyman 62% - 38% |
| 2020 | Treasurer | Davidson 54% - 46% |
| 2020 | Auditor | McCarthy 51% - 49% |
| 2020 | Attorney General | Larkin 51% - 49% |
| 2022 | Senate | Murray 51% - 49% |
| 2022 | Secretary of State (Spec.) | Anderson 51% - 44% |
| 2024 | President | Harris 51% - 45% |
| 2024 | Senate | Cantwell 52% - 48% |
| 2024 | Governor | Reichert 53% - 47% |
| 2024 | Lt. Governor | Matthews 52% - 48% |
| 2024 | Secretary of State | Hobbs 52% - 48% |
| 2024 | Treasurer | Pellicciotti 50.1% - 49.8% |
| 2024 | Auditor | McCarthy 51% - 49% |
| 2024 | Attorney General | Serrano 51% - 48% |
| 2024 | Commissioner of Public Lands | Herrera Beutler 54% - 46% |

== History ==
The 8th district was created after redistricting cycle after the 1980 census. For its first 30 years, it was centered on the Eastside region of the Seattle metropolitan area. After the 2010 U.S. census, the state responded to population changes by shifting much of the Eastside to the 9th district. To make up for the loss in population, areas east of the Cascades were shifted to the 8th district.

For the first 35 years of its existence, the 8th district was held by a Republican. It was located in an area that was historically the most Republican portion of the Seattle area. However, it was swept up in the larger Democratic trend in the Pacific Northwest since the 1990s, and has supported the Democratic nominee in every presidential election since 1992. Prior to the 2011 redistricting, the district had the peculiarity of having a Democratic advantage according to its Cook PVI, but only having elected Republicans to Congress throughout its history. After the district was pushed east of the Cascades with the 2010 redistricting, its PVI became even. The GOP winning streak ended with the 2018 election.

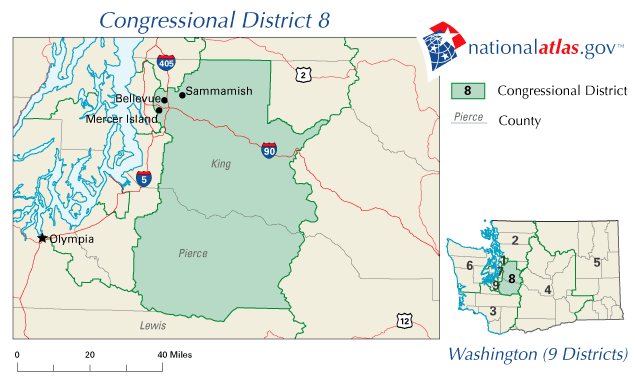
The district from 2003 to 2013

The district from 2013 to 2023

== Composition ==
For the 118th and successive Congresses (based on redistricting following the 2020 census), the district contains all or portions of the following counties and communities:

Chelan County (9)

All 9 communities

King County (32)

Ames Lake, Auburn (part; also 9th and 10th; shared with Pierce County), Black Diamond, Carnation, Cottage Lake (part; also 1st), Covington, Duvall, Enumclaw, East Renton Highlands (part; also 9th), Fairwood (part; also 9th), Fall City, Hobart, Issaquah, Kent (part; also 9th), Lake Holm, Lake Marcel-Stillwater, Lake Morton-Berrydale, Maple Heights-Lake Desire, Maple Valley, Mirrormont, North Bend, Ravensdale, Redmond (part; also 1st), Renton (part; also 9th), Riverbend, Riverpoint, Sammamish, Shadow Lake, Snoqualmie, Union Hill-Novelty Hill (part; also 1st), Wilderness Rim

Kittitas County (10)

All 10 communities

Pierce County (26)

Alder, Alderton (part; also 10th), Ashford, Bonney Lake (part; also 10th), Buckley, Carbonado, Clear Lake, Crocker, Eatonville, Elbe, Elk Plain, Graham (part; also 10th), La Grande, Lake Tapps, Kapowsin, McKenna, McMillin (part; also 10th), Orting, Prairie Heights, Prairie Ridge, South Creek, South Hill (part; also 10th), South Prairie, Sumner (part; also 10th), Tehaleh, Wilkeson

Snohomish County (19)

Arlington Heights, Bryant, Canyon Creek, Darrington, Everett (part; also 2nd), Gold Bar, Granite Falls, Index, Lake Bosworth, Lake Roesiger, May Creek, North Sultan, Oso, Snohomish (part; also 1st), Startup, Sultan, Swede Heaven, Verlot, Woods Creek

== Recent election results ==
=== 2004 ===
In 2004, Dave Reichert, at the time serving as the sheriff of King County, beat his Democratic opponent Dave Ross 52% to 47% in the race to replace 12-year incumbent Jennifer Dunn; that year, voters in the district favored Democratic presidential candidate John Kerry.

Washington's 8th congressional district election, 2004)
| Party | Candidate | Votes | % |
|---|---|---|---|
| Republican | Dave Reichert | 173,298 | 51.50 |
| Democratic | Dave Ross | 157,148 | 46.70 |
| Libertarian | Spencer Garrett | 6,053 | 1.80 |
| Total votes | | 336,499 | 100.00 |
| Republican hold | | | |

=== 2006 ===
Responding to Reichert's perceived vulnerability, former Microsoft program manager Darcy Burner (D) challenged Rep. Reichert in 2006, in what was widely expected to be a close election. Influential election analyst Charlie Cook listed the contest among 68 competitive or potentially competitive House races to watch in 2006, categorizing it as a "toss-up" (defined as "the most competitive; Either party has a good chance of winning"). Burner was one of 22 House challengers selected by the Democratic Congressional Campaign Committee (DCCC) for fundraising assistance with its "Red to Blue" program, aimed at unseating vulnerable Republican incumbents around the country.

In the end, Reichert won re-election, defeating Burner by just 7,341 votes out of more than 250,000 cast. The outcome of the race was not decided for almost a week after the election, as severe flooding in the eastern part of the district delayed the counting of absentee ballots.

Washington's 8th congressional district election, 2006)
| Party | Candidate | Votes | % |
|---|---|---|---|
| Republican | Dave Reichert (inc.) | 129,362 | 51.46 |
| Democratic | Darcy Burner | 122,021 | 48.54 |
| Total votes | | 251,383 | 100.00 |
| Republican hold | | | |

=== 2008 ===
In the 2008 election, Reichert faced Burner again in a rematch that many election watchers again described as one of the nation's hottest contests. This time, Reichert defeated Burner 53 percent to 47 percent, a solid victory despite Barack Obama's 15-point margin in the district.

Washington's 8th congressional district primary election, August 19, 2008
| Party | Candidate | Votes | % |
|---|---|---|---|
| Republican | Dave Reichert | 74,140 | 48.54% |
| Democratic | Darcy Burner | 68,010 | 44.53% |
| Democratic | James E. Vaughn | 5,051 | 3.31% |
| Independent | Richard Todd | 2,116 | 1.39% |
| Democratic | Keith Arnold | 1,886 | 1.23% |
| Independent | Boleslaw Orlinski | 1,523 | 1.00% |
| Total votes | | 152,726 | 100% |

Washington's 8th congressional district general election, November 4, 2008
| Party | Candidate | Votes | % |
|---|---|---|---|
| Republican | Dave Reichert | 191,568 | 52.78% |
| Democratic | Darcy Burner | 171,358 | 47.22% |
| Total votes | | 362,926 | 100% |

=== 2010 ===
In the 2010 election, Reichert and Democrat Suzan DelBene advanced out of the Washington State Top 2 Primaries with 47.2% and 26.9% of the vote, respectively. Reichert prevailed over DelBene in the General Election 52.1% to 47.9%. In this election, Reichert won both King and Pierce counties even after losing some key endorsements, including the Seattle Times, which endorsed Suzan DelBene and Tim Dillon in the primaries.

Washington's 8th congressional district primary election, August 17, 2010
| Party | Candidate | Votes | % |
|---|---|---|---|
| Republican | Dave Reichert (incumbent) | 76,118 | 47.23 |
| Democratic | Suzan DelBene | 43,272 | 26.85 |
| Democratic | Tom Cramer | 15,313 | 9.50 |
| Republican | Ernest Huber | 9,376 | 5.82 |
| Republican | Tim Dillon | 8,291 | 5.14 |
| Democratic | Keith Arnold | 3,405 | 2.11 |
| Independent | Robin Adair | 2,648 | 1.64 |
| Democratic | Boleslaw (John) Orlinski | 1,761 | 1.09 |
| Independent | Caleb Love Mardini | 987 | 0.61 |
| Total votes | | 161,171 | 100.00 |

Washington's 8th congressional district general election, November 2, 2010
| Party | Candidate | Votes | % |
|---|---|---|---|
| Republican | Dave Reichert (incumbent) | 161,296 | 52.05 |
| Democratic | Suzan DelBene | 148,581 | 47.95 |
| Total votes | | 309,877 | 100.00 |

=== 2012 ===
In the 2012 election, Reichert ran against Democrat Karen Porterfield, Associate Dean and Public Administration Lecturer at Seattle University. James Windle of Snoqualmie Pass also ran against Reichert as an independent candidate, but dropped out of the race in August 2012.

Washington 8th Congressional District - 6 November 2012
| Party | Candidate | Votes | % |
|---|---|---|---|
| Republican | Dave Reichert (Incumbent) | 180,204 | 59.7 |
| Democratic | Karen Porterfield | 121,886 | 40.3 |
| Total votes | | 302,090 | 100.0 |

=== 2014 ===
In the 2014 election, Reichert defeated Democrat Jason Ritchie, a small business owner from Issaquah.

Washington's 8th congressional district primary election, August 5, 2014
| Party | Candidate | Votes | % |
|---|---|---|---|
| Republican | Dave Reichert (incumbent) | 66,715 | 62.5 |
| Democratic | Jason Ritchie | 30,759 | 28.8 |
| Democratic | Keith Arnold | 9,273 | 8.7 |
| Total votes | | 105,746 | 100.0 |

Washington's 8th congressional district, 2014
| Party | Candidate | Votes | % |
|---|---|---|---|
| Republican | Dave Reichert (incumbent) | 125,741 | 63.3 |
| Democratic | Jason Ritchie | 73,003 | 36.7 |
| Total votes | | 198,744 | 100.0 |
| Republican hold | | | |

=== 2016 ===
In the 2016 election, Reichert defeated Democrat Tony Ventrella, a former sportscaster. Ventrella did not think he would beat the other candidates in the field and dropped out in July 2016 only to finish second overall and restart his campaign in the general election.

Washington's 8th congressional district primary election, August 2nd, 2016
| Party | Candidate | Votes | % |
|---|---|---|---|
| Republican | Dave Reichert (incumbent) | 73,600 | 56.8 |
| Democratic | Tony Ventrella | 22,035 | 17.0 |
| Democratic | Santiago Ramos | 17,900 | 13.8 |
| Democratic | Alida Skold | 10,825 | 8.4 |
| Independent | Keith Arnold | 3,153 | 2.4 |
| Independent | Margaret M. Walsh | 2,024 | 1.6 |
| Total votes | | 129,537 | 100.0 |

Washington's 8th congressional district, 2016
| Party | Candidate | Votes | % |
|---|---|---|---|
| Republican | Dave Reichert (incumbent) | 193,145 | 60.2 |
| Democratic | Tony Ventrella | 127,720 | 39.8 |
| Total votes | | 320,865 | 100.0 |
| Republican hold | | | |

=== 2018 ===
Reichert announced in September 2017 that he would not seek re-election. Former State Senator and gubernatorial nominee Dino Rossi advanced from the top-two primary alongside pediatrician Kim Schrier. In the general election, Schrier defeated Rossi with 52% of the vote to become the first Democrat to represent the district.

Washington's 8th congressional district primary election, August 7, 2018
| Party | Candidate | Votes | % |
|---|---|---|---|
| Republican | Dino Rossi | 73,288 | 43.1 |
| Democratic | Kim Schrier | 31,837 | 18.7 |
| Democratic | Jason Rittereiser | 30,708 | 18.1 |
| Democratic | Shannon Hader | 21,317 | 12.5 |
| Republican | Jack Hughes-Hageman | 4,270 | 2.5 |
| Republican | Gordon Allen Pross | 2,081 | 1.2 |
| Democratic | Tom Cramer | 1,468 | 0.9 |
| Independent Centrist | Bill Grassie | 1,163 | 0.7 |
| Libertarian | Richard Travis Reyes | 1,154 | 0.7 |
| Independent | Keith Arnold | 1,090 | 0.6 |
| Neither Major Party | Patrick Dillon | 898 | 0.5 |
| No party preference | Todd Mahaffey | 673 | 0.4 |
| Total votes | | 169,947 | 100.0 |

Washington's 8th congressional district, 2018
| Party | Candidate | Votes | % |
|---|---|---|---|
| Democratic | Kim Schrier | 164,089 | 52.4 |
| Republican | Dino Rossi | 148,968 | 47.6 |
| Total votes | | 313,057 | 100.0 |
| Democratic gain from Republican | | | |

=== 2020 ===
Schrier defeated Republican Jesse Jensen with 52% of the vote, a similar percentage as in 2018.

Washington's 8th congressional district primary election, August 4, 2020
| Party | Candidate | Votes | % |
|---|---|---|---|
| Democratic | Kim Schrier (incumbent) | 106,611 | 43.3 |
| Republican | Jesse Jensen | 49,368 | 20.0 |
| Republican | Keith R. Swank | 42,809 | 17.4 |
| Trump Republican Party | Dean Saulibio | 28,976 | 11.8 |
| Independent | Corey Bailey | 6,552 | 2.7 |
| Democratic | James Mitchell | 6,187 | 2.5 |
| Democratic | Keith Arnold | 4,111 | 1.7 |
| No party preference | Ryan Dean Burkett | 1,458 | 0.6 |
| Write-in | | 289 | 0.1 |
| Total votes | | 246,361 | 100.0 |

Washington's 8th congressional district, 2020
| Party | Candidate | Votes | % |
|---|---|---|---|
| Democratic | Kim Schrier (incumbent) | 213,123 | 51.7 |
| Republican | Jesse Jensen | 198,423 | 48.2 |
| Write-in | | 566 | 0.1 |
| Total votes | | 412,112 | 100.0 |
| Democratic hold | | | |

=== 2022 ===
Schrier defeated Republican Matt Larkin with 53% of the vote.

Washington's 8th congressional district primary election, August 2, 2022
| Party | Candidate | Votes | % |
|---|---|---|---|
| Democratic | Kim Schrier (incumbent) | 97,700 | 47.9 |
| Republican | Matt Larkin | 34,684 | 17.0 |
| Republican | Reagan Dunn | 29,494 | 14.4 |
| Republican | Jesse Jensen | 26,350 | 12.9 |
| Republican | Scott Stephenson | 7,954 | 3.9 |
| Democratic | Emet Ward | 1,832 | 0.9 |
| Republican | Dave Chapman | 1,811 | 0.9 |
| Democratic | Keith Arnold | 1,669 | 0.8 |
| Libertarian | Justin Greywolf | 1,518 | 0.7 |
| Independent | Ryan Burkett | 701 | 0.3 |
| Independent | Patrick Dillon | 296 | 0.1 |
| Write-in | | 122 | 0.1 |
| Total votes | | 204,131 | 100.0 |

2022 Washington's 8th congressional district election
| Party | Candidate | Votes | % |
|---|---|---|---|
| Democratic | Kim Schrier (incumbent) | 179,003 | 53.3 |
| Republican | Matt Larkin | 155,976 | 46.4 |
| Write-in | | 1,059 | 0.3 |
| Total votes | | 336,038 | 100.0 |
| Democratic hold | | | |

=== 2024 ===
Schrier defeated Republican Carmen Goers with 54% of the vote.

Washington's 8th congressional district primary election, August 6, 2024
| Party | Candidate | Votes | % |
|---|---|---|---|
| Democratic | Kim Schrier (incumbent) | 105,069 | 50.1 |
| Republican | Carmen Goers | 94,322 | 45.0 |
| Democratic | Imraan Siddiqi | 7,374 | 3.5 |
| Democratic | Keith Arnold | 2,603 | 1.2 |
| Write-in | | 291 | 0.1 |
| Total votes | | 209,659 | 100.0 |

2024 Washington's 8th congressional district election
| Party | Candidate | Votes | % |
|---|---|---|---|
| Democratic | Kim Schrier (incumbent) | 224,607 | 54.0 |
| Republican | Carmen Goers | 190,675 | 45.8 |
| Write-in | | 995 | 0.2 |
| Total votes | | 416,277 | 100.0 |
| Democratic hold | | | |

== List of members representing the district ==
| Member (District Home) | Party | Dates | Cong ress | Electoral history | District location |
|---|---|---|---|---|---|
District established January 3, 1983
| Rod Chandler (Bellevue) | Republican | January 3, 1983 – January 3, 1993 | 98th 99th 100th 101st 102nd | Elected in 1982. Re-elected in 1984. Re-elected in 1986. Re-elected in 1988. Re-elected in 1990. Retired to run for U.S. senator. | 1983–1985; Parts of King and Pierce |
| Rod Chandler (Bellevue) | Republican | January 3, 1983 – January 3, 1993 | 98th 99th 100th 101st 102nd | Elected in 1982. Re-elected in 1984. Re-elected in 1986. Re-elected in 1988. Re-elected in 1990. Retired to run for U.S. senator. | 1985–1993; Parts of King and Pierce |
| Jennifer Dunn (Bellevue) | Republican | January 3, 1993 – January 3, 2005 | 103rd 104th 105th 106th 107th 108th | Elected in 1992. Re-elected in 1994. Re-elected in 1996. Re-elected in 1998. Re-elected in 2000. Re-elected in 2002. Retired. | 1993–2003; Parts of King and Pierce |
| Jennifer Dunn (Bellevue) | Republican | January 3, 1993 – January 3, 2005 | 103rd 104th 105th 106th 107th 108th | Elected in 1992. Re-elected in 1994. Re-elected in 1996. Re-elected in 1998. Re-elected in 2000. Re-elected in 2002. Retired. | 2003–2013 Parts of King and Pierce |
| Dave Reichert (Auburn) | Republican | January 3, 2005 – January 3, 2019 | 109th 110th 111th 112th 113th 114th 115th | Elected in 2004. Re-elected in 2006. Re-elected in 2008. Re-elected in 2010. Re-elected in 2012. Re-elected in 2014. Re-elected in 2016. Retired. | 2003–2013 Parts of King and Pierce |
| Dave Reichert (Auburn) | Republican | January 3, 2005 – January 3, 2019 | 109th 110th 111th 112th 113th 114th 115th | Elected in 2004. Re-elected in 2006. Re-elected in 2008. Re-elected in 2010. Re-elected in 2012. Re-elected in 2014. Re-elected in 2016. Retired. | 2013–2023 Chelan and Kittitas; parts of Douglas, King, and Pierce |
| Kim Schrier (Sammamish) | Democratic | January 3, 2019 – present | 116th 117th 118th 119th | Elected in 2018. Re-elected in 2020. Re-elected in 2022. Re-elected in 2024. Re-elected in 2026. | 2013–2023 Chelan and Kittitas; parts of Douglas, King, and Pierce |
| Kim Schrier (Sammamish) | Democratic | January 3, 2019 – present | 116th 117th 118th 119th | Elected in 2018. Re-elected in 2020. Re-elected in 2022. Re-elected in 2024. Re-elected in 2026. | 2023–present Chelan and Kittitas; parts of Douglas, King, Pierce, and Snohomish |

== See also ==
- 2010 United States House of Representatives elections in Washington
- 2012 United States House of Representatives elections in Washington
- 2014 United States House of Representatives elections in Washington
- 2016 United States House of Representatives elections in Washington
- 2018 United States House of Representatives elections in Washington
- 2020 United States House of Representatives elections in Washington
- 2022 United States House of Representatives elections in Washington

== Sources ==
- Martis, Kenneth C. (1989). The Historical Atlas of Political Parties in the United States Congress. New York: Macmillan Publishing Company.
- Congressional Biographical Directory of the United States 1774–present
