= Kim Schrier =

American physician and politician (born 1968)

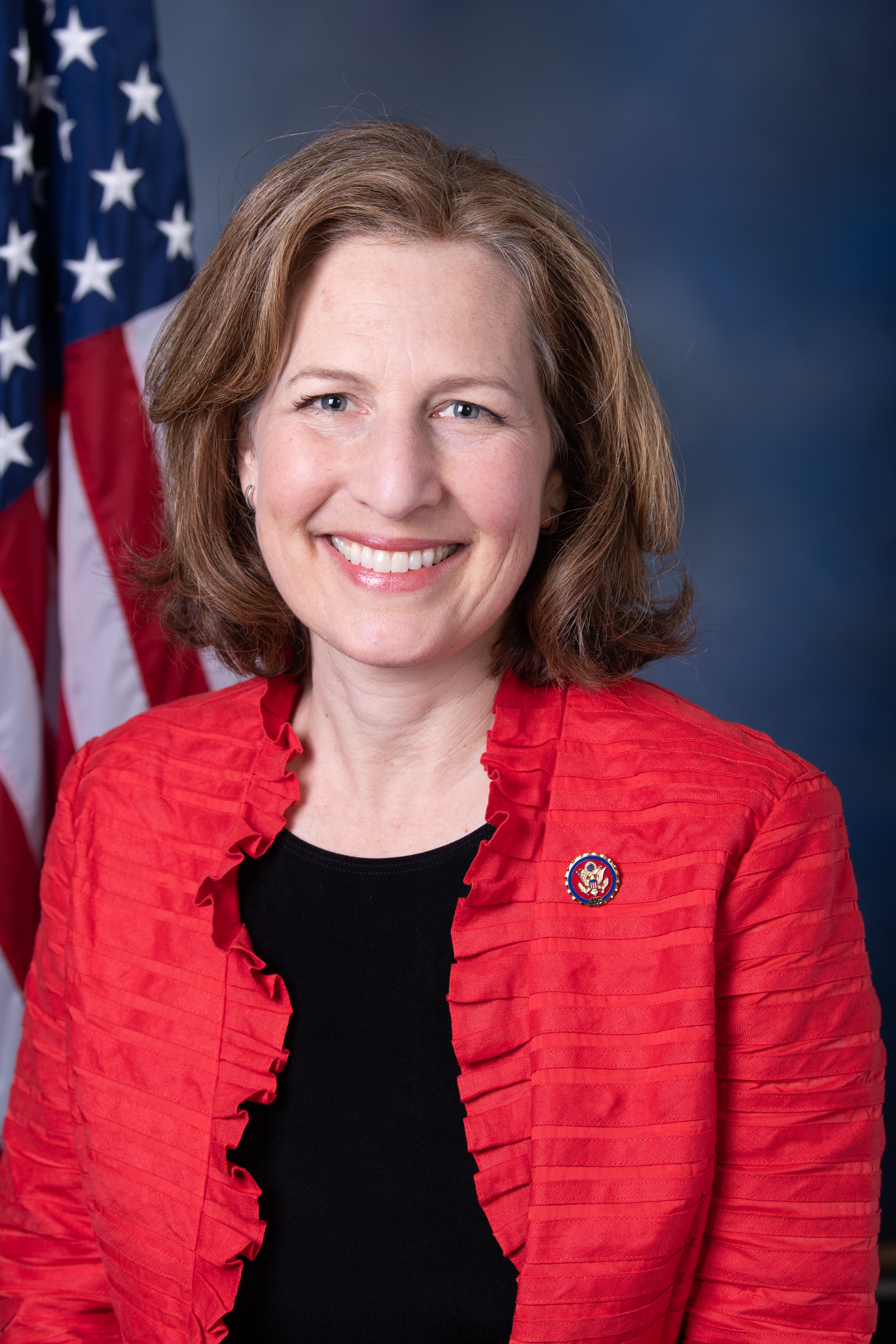
- Official portrait, 2019

Member of the U.S. House of Representatives from Washington's 8th district
- Incumbent
- Assumed office January 3, 2019
- Preceded by: Dave Reichert

Personal details
- Born: August 23, 1968 (age 58) Los Angeles, California, U.S.
- Party: Democratic
- Spouse: David Gowing
- Children: 1
- Education: University of California, Berkeley (BS); University of California, Davis (MD)
- Website: House website Campaign website

Kimberly Merle Schrier (/ˈʃraɪər/ SHRIRE; born August 23, 1968) is an American politician who has served as the U.S. representative for Washington's 8th congressional district since 2019. She is a member of the Democratic Party. Her district includes the suburbs east of Seattle, and extends across the Cascade Range to rural areas in central Washington, as well as the cities of Wenatchee and Ellensburg.

== Early life and education ==
Schrier was born and raised in Los Angeles, California, where she graduated from Palisades Charter High School. She earned a bachelor's degree from the University of California, Berkeley, graduating Phi Beta Kappa with a degree in astrophysics. She attended the University of California Davis School of Medicine, where she earned her Doctor of Medicine degree. She continued on to a residency at the Stanford University School of Medicine.

== Medical career ==
Schrier's professional career as a pediatrician began in Ashland, Oregon, where she worked for one year before joining Virginia Mason Medical Center in Issaquah, Washington in 2001. While working at Virginia Mason, she became politically active, particularly on healthcare issues. In 2017, Schrier was dissatisfied with Congressman Dave Reichert's handling of the efforts to repeal and replace the Patient Protection and Affordable Care Act and this, coupled with her frustration with the results of the 2016 elections, led to her decision to enter politics.

== U.S. House of Representatives ==
=== Elections ===
==== 2018 ====
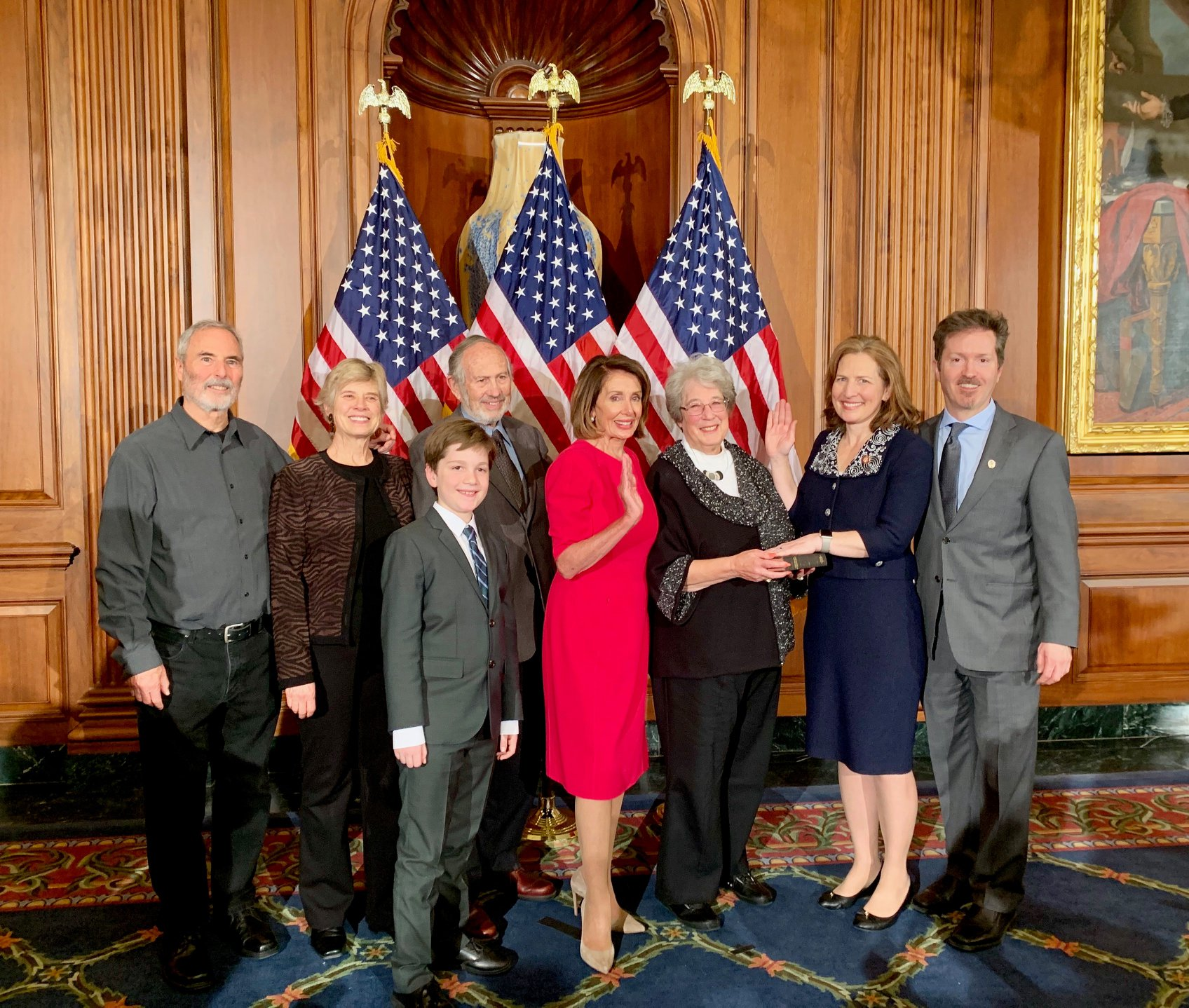
Schrier is sworn into the 116th Congress, 2019

Schrier announced her candidacy to represent Washington's 8th congressional district in August 2017, a year before the primary. She initially intended to challenge incumbent Dave Reichert, but the seat became open in September 2017 when Reichert announced his retirement. She had decided to run after the 2016 election, making the expansion of Medicare and the Affordable Care Act the centerpiece of her campaign.

No Democrat had ever been elected to represent the district and Reichert had been seen as a relatively safe incumbent, but his decision to retire left the seat as a potential Democratic pickup in an election year already leaning toward the Democratic Party.

Schrier advanced from the top-two primary, narrowly defeating attorney Jason Rittereiser, and advancing to face Republican Dino Rossi in the general election. The 8th district campaign attracted $25 million in spending, making it the most expensive in state history and one of the costliest nationally in 2018, including controversial attack ads from the Rossi campaign. One such ad nicknamed Schrier "Dr. Tax" and depicted her holding a large stack of $20 bills. The ad was perceived as antisemitic by The Washington Post.

Schrier won the general election with 52% of the vote. Although Rossi won 3 of the 4 counties in the district, Schrier won the district's portion of King County by nearly 30,000 votes, almost double her overall margin of 15,000 votes.

==== 2020 ====
Schrier ran for reelection. She advanced from the top-two primary in first place and faced the second-place finisher, Republican U.S. Army veteran and Amazon senior project manager Jesse Jensen. Schrier won the general election with 51.7% of the vote.

==== 2022 ====
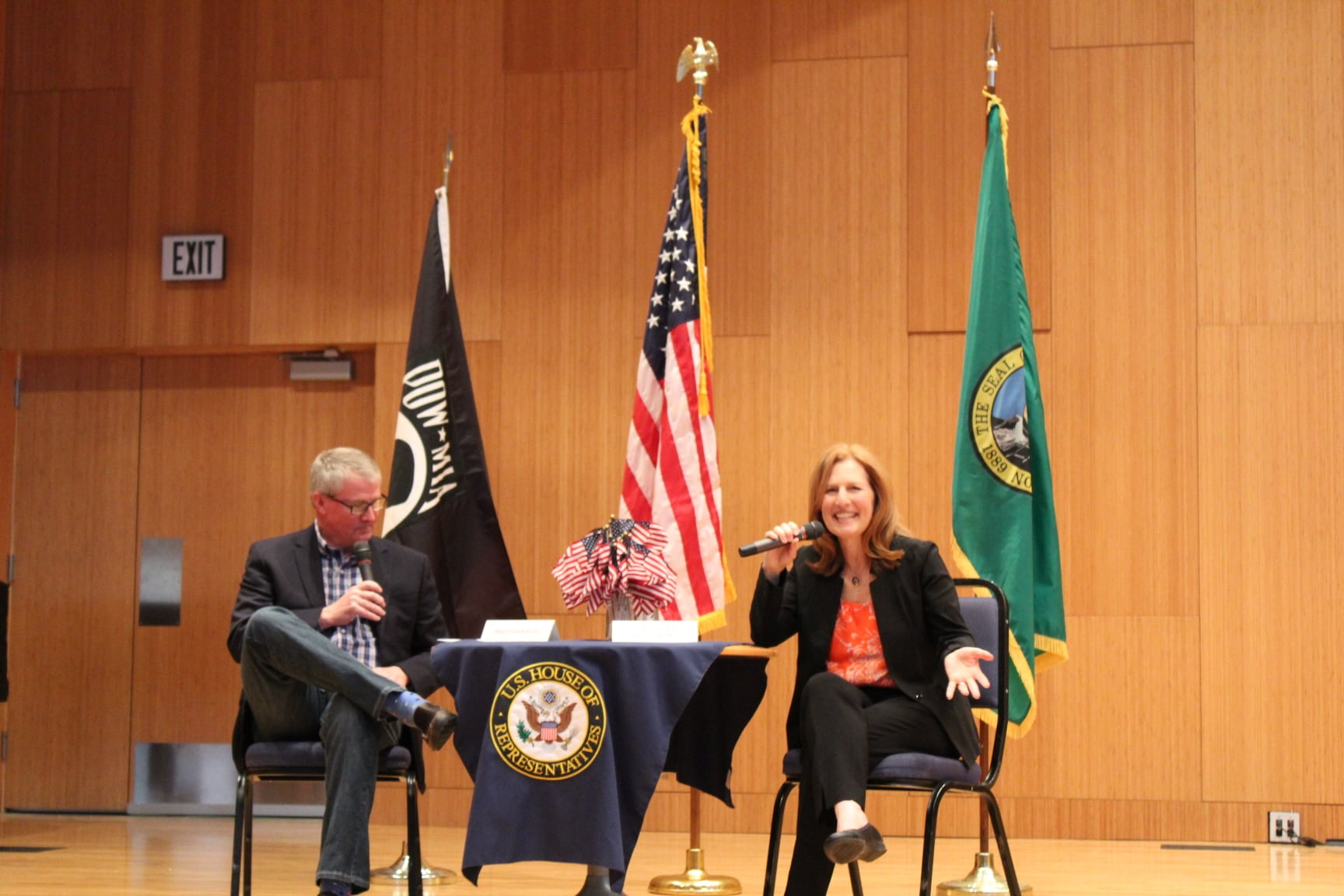
Schrier at a town hall meeting in Wenatchee, 2022

Schrier defeated Republican nominee and lawyer Matt Larkin with 53.3% of the vote. In 2022, Washington's 8th District was the state's most competitive and was among the key races in determining House partisan control. During the race, Schrier criticized Larkin's proposals for abortion bans without exceptions for rape or incest.

==== 2024 ====
Schrier ran for re-election. She and Republican Carmen Goers, a banker, advanced to the general election from the top-two primary. Schrier defeated Goers with 54.0% of the vote.

=== Tenure ===
Schrier was sworn into office on January 3, 2019, as the U.S. representative for Washington's 8th congressional district. During the 116th Congress, she served on the Committee on Education and Labor and Committee on Agriculture. During Donald Trump's administration, Schrier voted in line with the president's stated position 6.6% of the time. As of June 2023, Schrier had voted in line with Joe Biden's stated position 100% of the time.

In 2025, Schrier was one of 46 House Democrats who joined all Republicans to vote for the Laken Riley Act.

=== Committee assignments ===
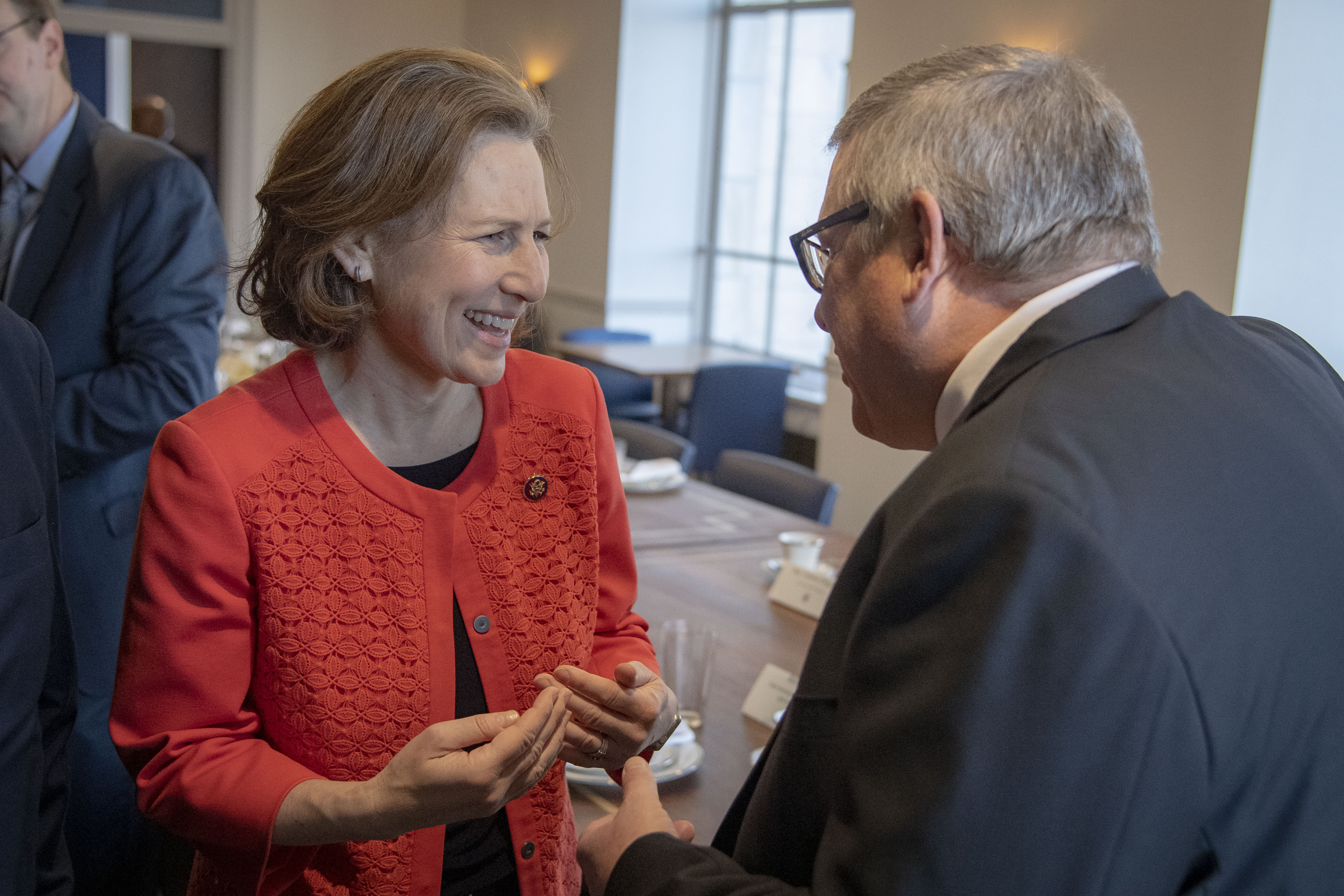
Schrier speaks with Bill Northey at an Agriculture Committee event, 2019

Schrier's committee assignments for the 119th Congress include:

- Committee on Energy and Commerce
  - Subcommittee on Commerce, Manufacturing, and Trade
  - Subcommittee on Health
  - Subcommittee on Energy

=== Caucus memberships ===
Schrier's caucus memberships include:

- Black Maternal Health Caucus
- Congressional Equality Caucus
- New Democrat Coalition (chair: Farm Bill Task Force)
- Sustainable Energy and Environment Coalition (co-chair: Climate and Agriculture Task Force)
- Congressional Doctors Caucus (co-chair)
- Congressional Asian Pacific American Caucus

== Personal life ==
Schrier and her husband, David Gowing, have a son and live in Sammamish, Washington. Her grandparents were Jewish immigrants from Europe who arrived in the United States before World War II. Schrier has Type 1 diabetes.

== Electoral history ==
US House election, 2018: Washington District 8
Primary election
Party	Candidate	Votes	%
Republican	Dino Rossi (Note: Listed on ballot as "GOP Party.")	73,288	43.12
Democratic	Kim Schrier	31,837	18.73
Democratic	Jason Rittereiser	30,708	18.07
Democratic	Shannon Hader	21,317	12.54
Republican	Jack Hughes-Hageman	4,270	2.51
Republican	Gordon Allen Pross	2,081	1.22
Democratic	Tom Cramer	1,468	0.86
Independent	Bill Grassie (Note: Listed on ballot as "Independent Centrist.")	1,163	0.68
Libertarian	Richard Travis Reyes	1,154	0.68
Independent	Keith Arnold	1,090	0.64
Independent	Patrick Dillon (Note: Listed on ballot as "Neither Major Party.")	898	0.53
Independent	Todd Mahaffey	673	0.40
Total votes		169,947	100
General election
Democratic	Kim Schrier	164,089	52.42
Republican	Dino Rossi	148,968	47.58
Total votes		313,057	100
Democratic gain from Republican			

US House election, 2020: Washington District 8
Primary election
Party	Candidate	Votes	%
Democratic	Kim Schrier (incumbent)	106,611	43.27
Republican	Jesse Jensen	49,368	20.04
Republican	Keith R. Swank	42,809	17.38
Republican	Dean Saulibio (Note: Listed on ballot as "Trump Republican Party.")	28,976	11.76
Independent	Corey Bailey	6,552	2.66
Democratic	James Mitchell	6,187	2.51
Democratic	Keith Arnold	4,111	1.67
Independent	Ryan Dean Burkett	1,458	0.59
Write-in		289	0.12
Total votes		246,361	100
General election
Democratic	Kim Schrier (incumbent)	213,123	51.71
Republican	Jesse Jensen	198,423	48.15
Write-in		566	0.14
Total votes		412,112	100
Democratic hold			

US House election, 2022: Washington District 8
Primary election
Party	Candidate	Votes	%
Democratic	Kim Schrier (incumbent)	97,700	47.86
Republican	Matt Larkin	34,684	16.99
Republican	Reagan Dunn	29,494	14.45
Republican	Jesse Jensen	26,350	12.91
Republican	Scott Stephenson	7,954	3.90
Democratic	Emet Ward	1,832	0.90
Republican	Dave Chapman	1,811	0.89
Democratic	Keith Arnold	1,669	0.82
Libertarian	Justin Greywolf	1,518	0.74
Independent	Ryan Burkett	701	0.34
Independent	Patrick Dillon	296	0.15
Write-in		122	0.12
Total votes		204,131	100
General election
Democratic	Kim Schrier (incumbent)	179,003	53.27
Republican	Matt Larkin	155,976	46.42
Write-in		1,059	0.32
Total votes		336,038	100
Democratic hold			

US House election, 2024: Washington District 8
Primary election
Party	Candidate	Votes	%
Democratic	Kim Schrier (incumbent)	105,069	50.11
Republican	Carmen Goers	94,322	44.99
Democratic	Imraan Siddiqi	7,374	3.52
Democratic	Keith Arnold	2,603	1.24
Write-in		291	0.14
Total votes		209,659	100
General election
Democratic	Kim Schrier (incumbent)	224,607	53.96
Republican	Carmen Goers	190,675	45.80
Write-in		995	0.24
Total votes		416,277	100
Democratic hold			

US House election, 2026: Washington District 8
Primary election
Party	Candidate	Votes	%
Democratic	Kim Schrier (incumbent)	102,853	53.69
Republican	Spencer Meline	30,324	15.83
Republican	Trinh Ha	28,340	14.79
Republican	Bob Hagglund	20,382	10.64
Democratic	Keith Arnold	4,777	2.49
Republican	Andres Valleza	4,549	2.37
Write-in		360	0.19
Total votes		191,585	100

== See also ==
- List of Jewish members of the United States Congress
- Women in the United States House of Representatives

== Notes ==
U.S. House of Representatives
Preceded by Dave Reichert	Member of the U.S. House of Representatives from Washington's 8th congressional district 2019–present	Incumbent
U.S. order of precedence (ceremonial)
Preceded by Chip Roy	United States representatives by seniority 224th	Succeeded by Greg Stanton
