= Shannon Hader =

American public health physician

Shannon Hader (born July 15, 1968) is an American public health physician and professor in the School of International Service at American University. She served as Dean of the school from 2022 to 2025. She is a published scientist and doctor, primarily focused on the HIV and AIDS epidemic. Her research specializes in infectious diseases.

== Education ==
Hader received a Bachelor of Science in biological sciences from Stanford University and her Masters of Public Health and Doctorate from Columbia University College of Physicians and Surgeons.

She conducted her residency at Duke University School of Medicine and participated in the Infectious Disease Fellowship at Emory University School of Medicine. She later received a certificate in Leadership Coaching from Georgetown University.

== Career ==
From 2003 to 2006, Hader served as the Director of CDC-Zimbabwe. In 2007, until 2010, Hader held the position of Senior Deputy Director, HIV/AIDS, Hepatitis, STD and TB Administration for the District of Columbia. There, she advised city officials on specific response tactics and increased education on HIV/AIDS.

Afterward, she was vice president and Director of the Center for Health Systems and Solutions at Futures Group, now known as Palladium, into 2014. While working at Palladium, she took a sabbatical in 2013 to work as a Health Policy Fellow at the Robert Wood Johnson Foundation under Senator Ed Markey.

In 2014, Hader was appointed Director of the Division of Global HIV and TB at the US Centers for Disease Control and Prevention (CDC). She helped implement the U.S. President's Emergency Plan for AIDS Relief (PEPFAR) to collect more data and increase global access to life-saving HIV treatment.

In 2018, Hader ran as a Democrat for the US House of Representatives to represent Washington's 8th Congressional District.

From 2019 to 2021, Hader served as an Assistant Secretary General at the United Nations and Deputy Executive Director for Program at UNAIDS.

Starting in 2022, Hader has worked at American University as Dean & Professor of the School of International Service. In 2025, she became a tenured professor in the Department of Environment, Development & Health.

== Awards ==
- Katherine Haughton Hepburn Visiting Fellow

== Publications ==
- "Expansion of Viral Load Testing and the Potential Impact on HIV Drug Resistance" 2017-12-01. The Journal of Infectious Diseases. 2017-12-01.
