= Elway Research =

Elway Research, Inc. is a Seattle-based public opinion research firm. Since 1975, Elway Research has research projects for major corporations, media outlets, associations, foundations, campaigns and governmental agencies at all levels.

They publish The Elway Poll, a monthly, independent survey of Washington state voters. They directed The Seattle Times Washington Poll, and have done surveys for Knight Ridder and NBC News in California.

They conducted nationally acclaimed citizen engagement programs on government accountability and performance measurement for Washington Governor Christine Gregoire and State Auditor Brian Sonntag. These programs include computer-aided town hall meetings and the first-of-its-kind statewide interactive survey on live television.

Elway Research also conducted interactive polling as part of the US Navy's “Conversation with the Country,” a multi-city series of town hall meetings as part of the development of a new maritime strategy for the United States.

== Criticisms ==
The Elway Poll came under fire for the accuracy of its polls in the 2008 gubernatorial campaign in Washington state. The Elway Poll showed Gregoire leading by 12 to 16 points, when other polls conducted at that time was only a 4 to 6 point lead for Gregiore. Ultimately, Gregoire won the election by around 6 points. Differentials such as these led some Republican bloggers to discount The Elway Poll results altogether. However, in 2016, the FiveThirtyEight Pollster Ratings gave Elway Research an "A+ grade," finding its results to be biased only half a percentage point more than the mean toward Democratic candidates.
