= Elections in Washington (state) =

In Washington, elections are governed by Articles II, III, and IV of the Washington State Constitution, which respectively include the establishment of elections for the legislative, executive, and judiciary branches of the state government; Article VI establishes election procedures and rights.

Washington uses a vote-by-mail system under the supervision of the Secretary of State, mandated statewide since 2011. Counties were previously able to choose between it and in-person voting from 2005 onward, of which all but one adopted vote-by-mail by 2011. Since 2008, most non-presidential elections are carried out using nonpartisan blanket primary, also known as the "top-two primary".

In a 2020 study, Washington was ranked as the 2nd easiest state for citizens to vote in.

== 1996 ==
- 1996 United States presidential election in Washington (state)
- 1996 Washington gubernatorial election

== 2000 ==
- 2000 United States presidential election in Washington (state)
- 2000 United States Senate election in Washington
- 2000 Washington gubernatorial election

== 2002 ==
- 2002 United States House of Representatives elections in Washington

== 2004 ==
=== Federal elections ===
- 2004 United States presidential election in Washington (state)
  - 2004 Washington Democratic presidential caucuses
- 2004 United States House of Representatives elections in Washington

=== State executive elections ===
- 2004 Washington gubernatorial election
- 2004 Washington lieutenant gubernatorial election
- 2004 Washington Attorney General election
- 2004 Washington Secretary of State election
- 2004 Washington Public Lands Commissioner election
- 2004 Washington State Auditor election
- 2004 Washington State Treasurer election
- 2004 Washington Superintendent of Public Instruction election
- 2004 Washington Insurance Commissioner election

=== State legislative elections ===
- 2004 Washington State Senate election

=== State court elections ===
- 2004 Washington Supreme Court election

=== Statewide ballot measures ===
- 2008 Washington Initiative 1000
- 2008 Washington Initiative 1029
- 2004 list of other statewide ballot measures

=== Local elections ===
- 2004 Pierce County Executive election

== 2006 ==
- 2006 United States Senate election in Washington
- 2006 United States House of Representatives elections in Washington
- 2006 Washington State local elections

== 2008 ==
=== Federal elections ===
- 2008 United States presidential election in Washington (state)
  - 2008 Washington Democratic presidential caucuses
  - 2008 Washington Republican presidential caucuses
- 2008 United States House of Representatives elections in Washington

=== State executive elections ===
- 2008 Washington gubernatorial election
- 2008 Washington lieutenant gubernatorial election
- 2008 Washington Attorney General election
- 2008 Washington Secretary of State election
- 2008 Washington Public Lands Commissioner election
- 2008 Washington State Auditor election
- 2008 Washington State Treasurer election
- 2008 Washington Superintendent of Public Instruction election
- 2008 Washington Insurance Commissioner election

=== State legislative elections ===
- 2008 Washington State Senate election
- 2008 Washington House of Representatives election

=== State court elections ===
- 2008 Washington Supreme Court election

=== Statewide ballot measures ===
- 2008 Washington Initiative 1000
- 2008 Washington Initiative 1029
- 2008 list of other statewide ballot measures

=== Local elections ===
- 2008 Pierce County Executive election

== 2009 ==
- 2009 Washington State local elections
- 2009 Seattle mayoral election

== 2010 ==
- 2010 United States Senate election in Washington
- 2010 United States House of Representatives elections in Washington

== 2012 ==
=== Federal elections ===
- 2012 United States presidential election in Washington (state)
  - 2012 Washington Democratic presidential caucuses
  - 2012 Washington Republican presidential caucuses
- 2012 United States Senate election in Washington
- 2012 United States House of Representatives elections in Washington

=== State executive elections ===
- 2012 Washington gubernatorial election
- 2012 Washington lieutenant gubernatorial election
- 2012 Washington Attorney General election
- 2012 Washington Secretary of State election
- 2012 Washington Public Lands Commissioner election
- 2012 Washington State Auditor election
- 2012 Washington State Treasurer election
- 2012 Washington Superintendent of Public Instruction election
- 2012 Washington Insurance Commissioner election

=== State legislative elections ===
- 2012 Washington State Senate election
- 2012 Washington House of Representatives election

=== State court elections ===
- 2012 Washington Supreme Court election

=== Statewide ballot measures ===
- 2012 Washington Referendum 74
- 2012 Washington Initiative 502
- 2012 Washington Initiative 1185
- 2012 Washington Initiative 1240
- 2012 list of other statewide ballot measures

=== Local elections ===
- 2012 Pierce County Executive election

== 2013 ==
=== State Legislative elections ===
- 2013 Washington's 26th state senate district special election

=== Statewide ballot measures ===
- 2013 Washington Initiative 522
- 2013 list of other statewide ballot measures

=== Local elections ===
- 2013 King County Executive election
- 2013 Seattle mayoral election

== 2014 ==
=== Federal elections ===
- 2014 United States House of Representatives elections in Washington

=== State legislative elections ===
- 2014 Washington State Senate election
- 2014 Washington House of Representatives election

=== Local elections ===
- 2014 Snohomish County Executive special election

== 2016 ==
=== Federal elections ===
- 2016 United States presidential election in Washington (state)
  - 2016 Washington Democratic presidential caucuses
  - 2016 Washington Republican presidential primary
- 2016 United States Senate election in Washington
- 2016 United States House of Representatives elections in Washington

=== State executive elections ===
- 2016 Washington gubernatorial election
- 2016 Washington lieutenant gubernatorial election
- 2016 Washington Attorney General election
- 2016 Washington Secretary of State election
- 2016 Washington Public Lands Commissioner election
- 2016 Washington State Auditor election
- 2016 Washington State Treasurer election
- 2016 Washington Superintendent of Public Instruction election
- 2016 Washington Insurance Commissioner election

=== State legislative elections ===
- 2016 Washington State Senate election
- 2016 Washington House of Representatives election

=== Statewide ballot measures ===
- 2016 Washington Initiative 732
- 2016 list of other statewide ballot measures

=== Local elections ===
- 2016 Pierce County Executive election
- Sound Transit 3

== 2017 ==
=== State legislative elections ===
- 2017 Washington's 45th state senate district special election

=== Local elections ===
- 2017 King County Executive election
- 2017 Seattle mayoral election

== 2018 ==
=== Federal elections ===
- 2018 United States Senate election in Washington
- 2018 United States House of Representatives elections in Washington

=== State legislative elections ===
- 2018 Washington State Senate election
- 2018 Washington House of Representatives election

=== Statewide ballot measures ===
- 2018 Washington Initiative 940
- 2018 Washington Initiative 1631
- 2018 Washington Initiative 1634
- 2018 Washington Initiative 1639

== 2019 ==
=== Statewide ballot measures ===
- 2019 Washington Referendum 88
- 2019 Washington Initiative 976
- 2019 Washington Senate Joint Resolution 8200

=== Local Elections ===
- 2019 Snohomish County Executive election
- 2019 Spokane mayoral election

== 2020 ==
=== Federal elections ===
- 2020 United States presidential election in Washington (state)
  - 2020 Washington Democratic presidential primary
  - 2020 Washington Republican presidential primary
- 2020 United States House of Representatives elections in Washington

=== State executive elections ===
- 2020 Washington gubernatorial election
- 2020 Washington lieutenant gubernatorial election
- 2020 Washington Attorney General election
- 2020 Washington Secretary of State election
- 2020 Washington Public Lands Commissioner election
- 2020 Washington State Auditor election
- 2020 Washington State Treasurer election
- 2020 Washington Superintendent of Public Instruction election
- 2020 Washington Insurance Commissioner election

=== State legislative elections ===
- 2020 Washington State Senate election
- 2020 Washington House of Representatives election

=== Statewide ballot measures ===
- 2020 Washington Referendum 90
- 2020 Washington Senate Joint Resolution 8212

=== Local elections ===
- 2020 Pierce County Executive election

== 2021 ==
=== Local elections ===
- 2021 King County Executive election
- 2021 Seattle mayoral election
- 2021 Seattle City Attorney election
- 2021 Seattle City Council election
- 2021 Seattle City Council 3rd district recall election

== 2022 ==
=== Federal elections ===
- 2022 United States Senate election in Washington
- 2022 United States House of Representatives elections in Washington

=== State elections ===
- 2022 Washington Secretary of State special election
- 2022 Washington State Senate election
- 2022 Washington House of Representatives election

== 2023 ==
=== Local elections ===
- 2023 Snohomish County Executive election
- 2023 Seattle City Council election
- 2023 Spokane mayoral election

== 2024 ==
=== Federal elections ===
- 2024 United States presidential election in Washington (state)
  - 2024 Washington Democratic presidential primary
  - 2024 Washington Republican presidential primary
- 2024 United States Senate election in Washington
- 2024 United States House of Representatives elections in Washington

=== State executive elections ===
- 2024 Washington gubernatorial election
- 2024 Washington lieutenant gubernatorial election
- 2024 Washington Attorney General election
- 2024 Washington Secretary of State election
- 2024 Washington Public Lands Commissioner election
- 2024 Washington State Auditor election
- 2024 Washington State Treasurer election
- 2024 Washington Superintendent of Public Instruction election
- 2024 Washington Insurance Commissioner election

=== State legislative elections ===
- 2024 Washington State Senate election
- 2024 Washington House of Representatives election

=== State court elections ===
- 2024 Washington Supreme Court election

=== Statewide ballot measures ===
- 2024 Washington Initiative 2066
- 2024 Washington Initiative 2109
- 2024 Washington Initiative 2117
- 2024 Washington Initiative 2124

=== Local elections ===
- 2024 Pierce County Executive election
- 2024 Seattle City Council special election

== 2025 ==
=== State legislative elections ===
- 2025 Washington State Senate special election
- 2025 Washington House of Representatives election

=== Statewide ballot measures ===
- 2025 Washington Resolution 8201

=== Local elections ===
- 2025 King County Executive election
- 2025 King County Council election
- 2025 Seattle mayoral election
- 2025 Seattle City Attorney election
- 2025 Seattle City Council election

== 2026 ==
=== Federal elections ===
- 2026 United States House of Representatives elections in Washington

=== State legislative elections ===
- 2026 Washington State Senate election
- 2026 Washington House of Representatives election

=== State court elections ===
- 2026 Washington Supreme Court election

=== Local elections ===
- 2026 King County elections
- 2026 King County Council election
- 2026 Seattle City Council special election

== See also ==
- Political party strength in Washington (state)
- United States presidential elections in Washington (state)
- Nonpartisan blanket primary
- Washington State Redistricting Commission
- List of Washington (state) ballot measures
