= 2008 Pierce County Executive election =

- November 4, 2008
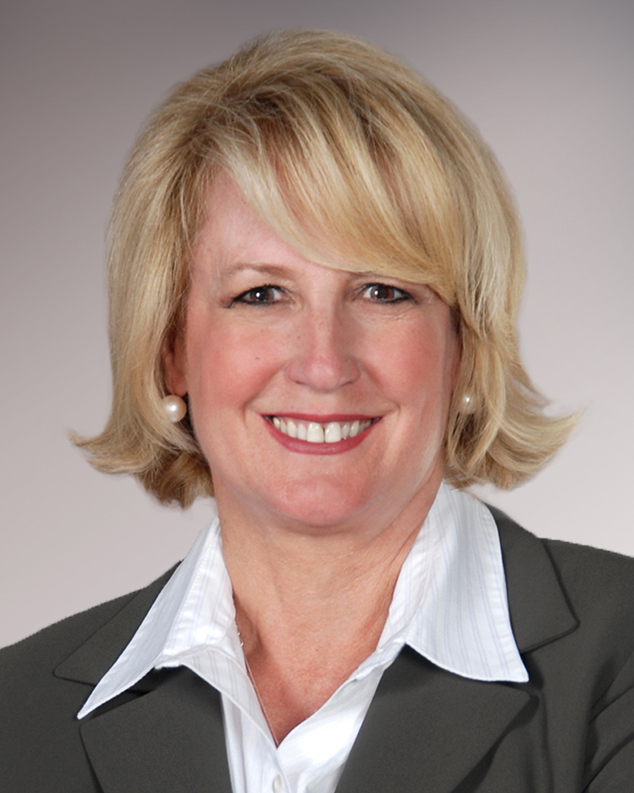

Candidate	Pat McCarthy	Shawn Bunney
Party	Democratic	Republican
First round	79,235; 26.49%	105,057; 35.12%
Maximum round	136,346; 50.75%	132,292; 49.25%
Candidate	Calvin Goings	Mike Lonergan
Party	Democratic	Independent
First round	69,052; 23.08%	45,330; 15.15%
Maximum round	Eliminated	Eliminated
County Executive before election
John Ladenburg
Democratic
Elected County Executive
Pat McCarthy
Democratic

The 2008 Pierce County Executive election took place on November 4, 2008, to elect the County Executive of Pierce County, Washington. Incumbent County Executive John Ladenburg was term-limited and could not run for re-election to a third consecutive term. Following the adoption of ranked-choice voting by county voters in 2006, county elections were conducted with ranked-choice voting in 2008.

Four candidates ran to succeed Ladenburg: County Councilmen Shawn Bunney, a Republican, and Calvin Goings, a Democrat; County Auditor Pat McCarthy, a Democrat; and Tacoma City Councilman Mike Lonergan, who ran as an independent.

In the first round, Bunney placed first, winning 35 percent of the vote to McCarthy's 26 percent, Goings's 23 percent, and Lonergan's 15 percent. Lonergan was eliminated after the first round, and in the second, Bunney remained in first place with 41 percent, McCarthy was in second with 27 percent, and Goings was third with 27 percent, and was eliminated. In the final round, McCarthy narrowly defeated Bunney, winning 51 percent of the vote, and became the county's first female County Executive.

This was the only election for County Executive conducted with ranked-choice voting. Following its usage in the 2008 election, voters repealed it in a landslide in 2009.

== General election ==
=== Candidates ===
- Shawn Bunney, County Councilman (Republican)
- Calvin Goings, County Councilman (Democratic)
- Mike Lonergan, Tacoma City Councilman (independent)
- Pat McCarthy, County Auditor (Democratic)

==== Declined ====
- Terry Lee, County Councilman
- Brian Sonntag, State Auditor

=== Results ===
==== Summary ====
2008 Pierce County Executive election
Candidate	Maximum round	Maximum votes	Share in maximum round	Maximum votes First round votesTransfer votes
Pat McCarthy	3	136,346	50.75%	
Shawn Bunney	3	132,292	49.25%	
Calvin Goings	2	77,427	26.85%	
Mike Lonergan	1	45,330	15.15%	
Write-ins	1	458	0.15%	

==== Vote counts by round ====
Vote counts by round
Candidate	Round 1	Round 2	Round 3
Pat McCarthy	79,235	92,208	136,346
Shawn Bunney	105,057	118,690	132,292
Calvin Goings	69,052	77,427	
Mike Lonergan	45,330		
Write-ins	458		
Continuing votes	299,132	288,325	268,638
Exhausted ballots	0	10,746	30,308
Over votes	532	593	718
Under votes	13,107	13,107	13,107
Total	312,771	312,771	312,771
