= 2008 Washington Attorney General election =

- November 4, 2008
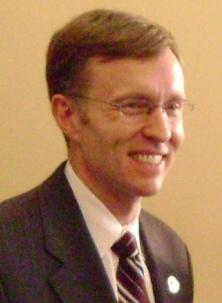

Nominee	Rob McKenna	John Ladenburg
Party	Republican	Democratic
Popular vote	1,689,764	1,152,174
Percentage	59.46%	40.54%
- McKenna: 50–60% 60–70% 70–80% Ladenburg: 50–60% 60–70%
Attorney General before election
Rob McKenna
Republican
Elected Attorney General
Rob McKenna
Republican

The 2008 Washington Attorney General election was held on Tuesday, November 4, 2008, to elect the attorney general of Washington, concurrently with the 2008 U.S. presidential election, as well as elections to the U.S. Senate and various state and local elections, including for U.S. House and governor of Washington. Washington is one of two states that holds a top-two primary, meaning that all candidates are listed on the same ballot regardless of party affiliation, and the top two move on to the general election.

Incumbent Republican Attorney General Rob McKenna was re-elected to a second term in office, defeating Democratic challenger John Ladenburg in a landslide, winning by almost 20 points and carrying all but two counties. As of 2026, this is the last time a Republican was elected Washington Attorney General. Along with the concurrent secretary of state election, this is also the last time King County voted Republican in a statewide election against a Democratic opponent. (Note: The 2016 Washington State Treasurer election was contested between 2 Republicans.)

== Candidates ==
=== Republican Party ===
==== Advanced to general ====
- Rob McKenna, incumbent attorney general (2005–2013)

=== Democratic Party ===
==== Advanced to general ====
- John Ladenburg, Pierce County Executive

== Primary election ==
=== Results ===
County results McKenna: 50–60%; 60–70%; 70–80%; Ladenburg: 50–60%

Congressional district results McKenna: 50–60%; 60–70%; Ladenburg: 60–70%

Blanket primary results
Party	Candidate	Votes	%
Republican	Rob McKenna (incumbent)	783,240	56.98
Democratic	John Ladenburg	591,254	43.02
Total votes		1,374,494	100.00

==== By county ====
County results
County	Rob McKenna Republican		John Ladenburg Democratic		Margin		Total votes
County	#	%	#	%	#	%	Total votes
Adams	1,903	75.10%	631	24.90%	1,272	50.20%	2,534
Asotin	3,040	57.79%	2,220	42.21%	820	15.59%	5,260
Benton	27,127	71.14%	11,006	28.86%	16,121	42.28%	38,133
Chelan	11,627	68.59%	5,325	31.41%	6,302	37.18%	16,952
Clallam	12,906	59.19%	8,898	40.81%	4,008	18.38%	21,804
Clark	40,625	55.97%	31,960	44.03%	8,665	11.94%	72,585
Columbia	1,055	72.46%	401	27.54%	654	44.92%	1,456
Cowlitz	10,890	50.82%	10,539	49.18%	351	1.64%	21,429
Douglas	5,819	69.29%	2,579	30.71%	3,240	38.58%	8,398
Ferry	1,274	64.51%	701	35.49%	573	29.01%	1,975
Franklin	7,523	68.87%	3,401	31.13%	4,122	37.73%	10,924
Garfield	559	73.46%	202	26.54%	357	46.91%	761
Grant	10,239	69.50%	4,493	30.50%	5,746	39.00%	14,732
Grays Harbor	9,462	55.56%	7,569	44.44%	1,893	11.12%	17,031
Island	14,672	60.49%	9,584	39.51%	5,088	20.98%	24,256
Jefferson	5,763	45.56%	6,887	54.44%	-1,124	-8.89%	12,650
King	174,732	50.94%	168,302	49.06%	6,430	1.87%	343,034
Kitsap	37,004	57.06%	27,851	42.94%	9,153	14.11%	64,855
Kittitas	6,380	65.85%	3,308	34.15%	3,072	31.71%	9,688
Klickitat	2,887	56.57%	2,216	43.43%	671	13.15%	5,103
Lewis	13,135	68.45%	6,055	31.55%	7,080	36.89%	19,190
Lincoln	2,677	71.22%	1,082	28.78%	1,595	42.43%	3,759
Mason	9,823	58.31%	7,023	41.69%	2,800	16.62%	16,846
Okanogan	5,546	64.48%	3,055	35.52%	2,491	28.96%	8,601
Pacific	3,255	49.18%	3,364	50.82%	-109	-1.65%	6,619
Pend Oreille	2,408	63.67%	1,374	36.33%	1,034	27.34%	3,782
Pierce	78,228	52.88%	69,708	47.12%	8,520	5.76%	147,936
San Juan	2,975	45.25%	3,599	54.75%	-624	-9.49%	6,574
Skagit	17,744	59.53%	12,065	40.47%	5,679	19.05%	29,809
Skamania	1,262	52.50%	1,142	47.50%	120	4.99%	2,404
Snohomish	81,159	57.25%	60,609	42.75%	20,550	14.50%	141,768
Spokane	64,421	60.71%	41,687	39.29%	22,734	21.43%	106,108
Stevens	8,470	68.18%	3,953	31.82%	4,517	36.36%	12,423
Thurston	37,617	58.45%	26,745	41.55%	10,872	16.89%	64,362
Wahkiakum	766	56.95%	579	43.05%	187	13.90%	1,345
Walla Walla	8,768	66.17%	4,483	33.83%	4,285	32.34%	13,251
Whatcom	26,279	55.45%	21,115	44.55%	5,164	10.90%	47,394
Whitman	4,941	61.20%	3,133	38.80%	1,808	22.39%	8,074
Yakima	28,279	69.50%	12,410	30.50%	15,869	39.00%	40,689
Totals	783,240	56.98%	591,254	43.02%	191,986	13.97%	1,374,494

==== By congressional district ====
District	McKenna	Ladenburg	Representative
1st	57%	43%	Jay Inslee
2nd	57%	43%	Rick Larsen
3rd	57%	43%	Brian Baird
4th	69%	31%	Doc Hastings
5th	62%	38%	Cathy McMorris Rodgers
6th	53%	47%	Norm Dicks
7th	36%	64%	Jim McDermott
8th	63%	37%	Dave Reichert
9th	56%	44%	Adam Smith

== General election ==
=== Endorsements ===
Rob McKenna (R)

Statewide officials

- Brian Sonntag, state auditor of Washington (1993–2013) (Democratic)

Newspapers

- The Seattle Times
John Ladenburg (D)

Statewide officials

- Christine Gregoire, governor of Washington (2005–2013)

=== Polling ===
Poll source	Date(s) administered	Sample size	Margin of error	Rob McKenna (R)	John Ladenburg (D)	Undecided
SurveyUSA	October 30 – November 2, 2008	663 (LV)	± 3.8%	59%	36%	6%
SurveyUSA	October 26–27, 2008	630 (LV)	± 3.9%	57%	36%	7%
SurveyUSA	October 12–13, 2008	544 (LV)	± 4.3%	54%	38%	8%
SurveyUSA	September 21–22, 2008	682 (LV)	± 3.8%	53%	39%	8%
SurveyUSA	September 5–7, 2008	658 (LV)	± 3.9%	55%	40%	5%
SurveyUSA	August 11–12, 2008	718 (LV)	± 3.7%	51%	43%	6%
SurveyUSA	July 13–15, 2008	666 (LV)	± 3.9%	49%	41%	10%
SurveyUSA	June 7–9, 2008	637 (LV)	± 4.0%	49%	42%	9%

=== Results ===
2008 Washington Attorney General election
Party	Candidate	Votes	%	±%
Republican	Rob McKenna (incumbent)	1,689,764	59.46%	+6.48%
Democratic	John Ladenburg	1,152,174	40.54%	–2.73%
Total votes		2,841,938	100.00%	N/A
Republican hold				

==== By county ====
County results
County	Rob McKenna Republican		John Ladenburg Democratic		Margin		Total votes
County	#	%	#	%	#	%	Total votes
Adams	3,480	76.28%	1,082	23.72%	2,398	52.56%	4,562
Asotin	5,812	63.20%	3,384	36.80%	2,428	26.40%	9,196
Benton	51,092	73.68%	18,248	26.32%	32,844	47.37%	69,340
Chelan	21,091	70.10%	8,996	29.90%	12,095	40.20%	30,087
Clallam	22,459	62.13%	13,690	37.87%	8,769	24.26%	36,149
Clark	95,135	56.13%	74,360	43.87%	20,775	12.26%	169,495
Columbia	1,600	77.07%	476	22.93%	1,124	54.14%	2,076
Cowlitz	21,566	51.57%	20,250	48.43%	1,316	3.15%	41,816
Douglas	10,405	72.49%	3,949	27.51%	6,456	44.98%	14,354
Ferry	2,164	66.32%	1,099	33.68%	1,065	32.64%	3,263
Franklin	13,276	70.07%	5,671	29.93%	7,605	40.14%	18,947
Garfield	994	78.21%	277	21.79%	717	56.41%	1,271
Grant	18,699	71.77%	7,356	28.23%	11,343	43.53%	26,055
Grays Harbor	17,051	61.29%	10,771	38.71%	6,280	22.57%	27,822
Island	25,531	64.55%	14,022	35.45%	11,509	29.10%	39,553
Jefferson	9,307	49.61%	9,454	50.39%	-147	-0.78%	18,761
King	453,330	53.56%	393,111	46.44%	60,219	7.11%	846,441
Kitsap	71,317	60.21%	47,123	39.79%	24,194	20.43%	118,440
Kittitas	11,379	68.09%	5,332	31.91%	6,047	36.19%	16,711
Klickitat	5,166	55.49%	4,144	44.51%	1,022	10.98%	9,310
Lewis	23,176	70.61%	9,648	29.39%	13,528	41.21%	32,824
Lincoln	4,185	75.43%	1,363	24.57%	2,822	50.87%	5,548
Mason	17,019	62.79%	10,084	37.21%	6,935	25.59%	27,103
Okanogan	9,971	63.45%	5,743	36.55%	4,228	26.91%	15,714
Pacific	5,460	53.67%	4,714	46.33%	746	7.33%	10,174
Pend Oreille	4,179	67.67%	1,997	32.33%	2,182	35.33%	6,176
Pierce	181,792	58.20%	130,550	41.80%	51,242	16.41%	312,342
San Juan	4,551	46.56%	5,224	53.44%	-673	-6.88%	9,775
Skagit	33,530	63.34%	19,410	36.66%	14,120	26.67%	52,940
Skamania	2,672	53.34%	2,337	46.66%	335	6.69%	5,009
Snohomish	186,169	61.36%	117,226	38.64%	68,943	22.72%	303,395
Spokane	134,706	65.03%	72,439	34.97%	62,267	30.06%	207,145
Stevens	14,841	70.30%	6,270	29.70%	8,571	40.60%	21,111
Thurston	74,734	62.41%	45,007	37.59%	29,727	24.83%	119,741
Wahkiakum	1,203	57.70%	882	42.30%	321	15.40%	2,085
Walla Walla	15,911	69.65%	6,934	30.35%	8,977	39.30%	22,845
Whatcom	53,466	56.95%	40,419	43.05%	13,047	13.90%	93,885
Whitman	10,085	62.42%	6,071	37.58%	4,014	24.85%	16,156
Yakima	51,260	68.97%	23,061	31.03%	28,199	37.94%	74,321
Totals	1,689,764	59.46%	1,152,174	40.54%	537,590	18.92%	2,841,938

Counties that flipped from Democratic to Republican

- King (largest city: Seattle)
- Pacific (largest city: Raymond)

==== By congressional district ====
McKenna won eight of nine congressional districts, including five that elected Democrats.

District	McKenna	Ladenburg	Representative
1st	61%	39%	Jay Inslee
2nd	61%	39%	Rick Larsen
3rd	58%	42%	Brian Baird
4th	70%	30%	Doc Hastings
5th	66%	34%	Cathy McMorris Rodgers
6th	57%	43%	Norm Dicks
7th	40%	60%	Jim McDermott
8th	66%	34%	Dave Reichert
9th	60%	40%	Adam Smith
