= Ladenburg (surname) =

Ladenburg is a surname. Notable people with the surname include:

- Albert Ladenburg (1842-1911), German chemist
- Connie Ladenburg, American politician
- Eugenie Mary Ladenburg Davie (1895–1975), American political activist
- John Ladenburg (born 1949), American politician
- Rudolf Ladenburg (1882–1952), German atomic physicist
