= Rob McKenna =

17th attorney general of Washington

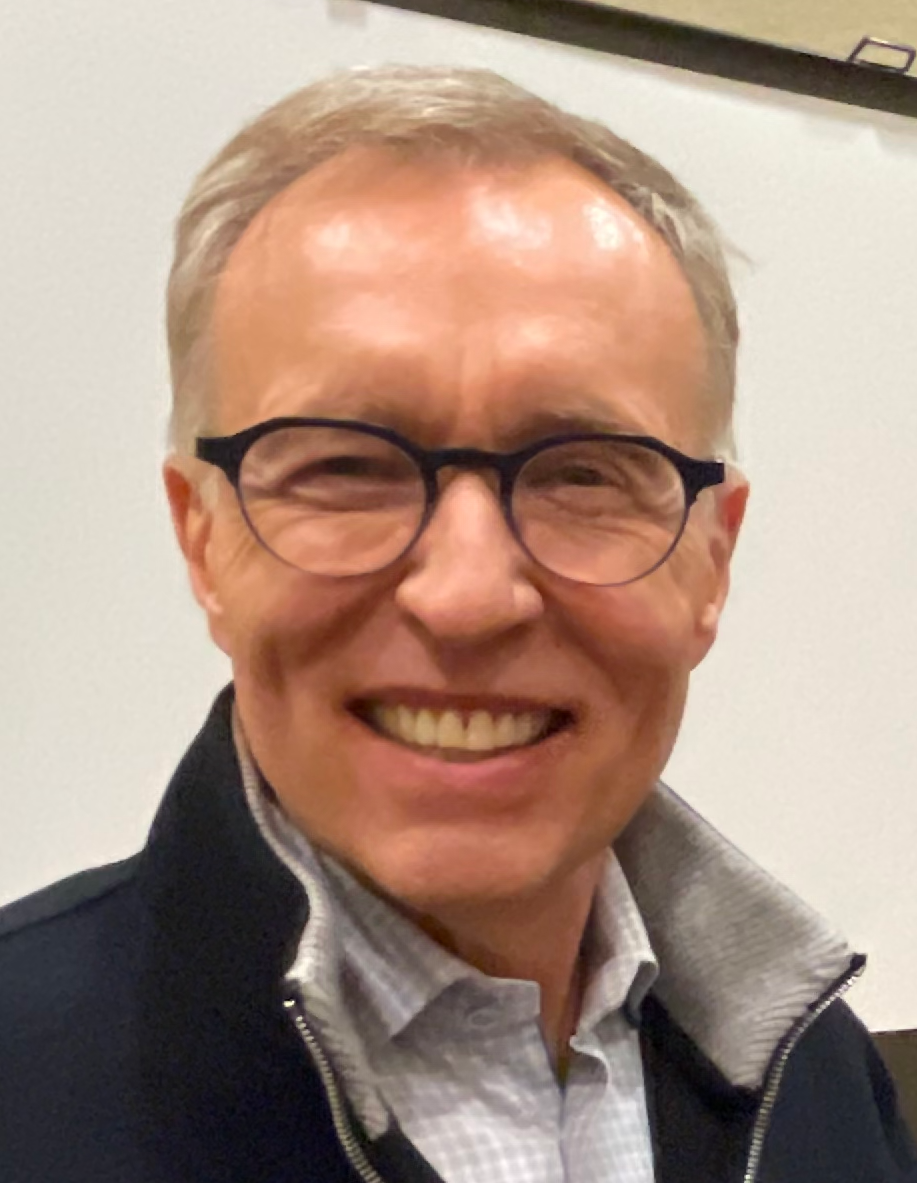
- McKenna in 2025

17th Attorney General of Washington
- In office January 12, 2005 – January 16, 2013
- Governor: Christine Gregoire
- Preceded by: Christine Gregoire
- Succeeded by: Bob Ferguson

Member of the King County Council from the 6th district
- In office January 1, 1996 – January 12, 2005
- Preceded by: Bruce Laing
- Succeeded by: Reagan Dunn

Personal details
- Born: Robert Marion McKenna; October 1, 1962 (age 64) Fort Sam Houston, Texas, U.S.
- Party: Republican
- Spouses: Marilyn McKenna (m. 1986; div. 2016) Amy McKenna (m. 2020)
- Children: 4
- Education: University of Washington (BA); University of Chicago (JD)

Robert Marion McKenna (born October 1, 1962) is an American lawyer and politician who served as the 17th attorney general of Washington from 2005 to 2013 after serving on the Metropolitan King County Council from 1996 to 2005. A member of the Republican Party, he ran for Governor of Washington in 2012, losing to Democrat Jay Inslee.

McKenna is an Eagle Scout, was student body president at the University of Washington, and attended the University of Chicago Law School, where he was on the law review. He currently is a partner at Orrick, Herrington & Sutcliffe LLP in Seattle where he represents a wide range of technology and other companies in matters involving cyber security, data privacy, litigation, appellate litigation, regulatory proceedings, state attorney general investigations, and legislative issues.

To date, he is the most recent Republican to serve as Attorney General of Washington.

== Early life, education, and legal career ==
McKenna was born in Fort Sam Houston, Texas, the son of Bonnie Jean (née Olson) and Robert Elliott McKenna, an Army officer. His ancestry includes Irish, Norwegian, and German. He grew up at posts in Germany, Bangkok (where he attended the International School Bangkok), San Francisco and Kansas before his family settled in Bellevue, Washington when he was 14.

He graduated from Sammamish High School in Bellevue in 1980. He earned two bachelor's degrees, in Economics and International Studies, from the University of Washington and was elected to Phi Beta Kappa. He was student body president in 1984–85. He received a J.D. from the University of Chicago Law School in 1988.

After graduating from law school, McKenna worked as an attorney at the law firm of Perkins Coie, one of the 50 largest firms in the country, where he practiced mainly business and regulatory law from June 1988 to January 1996.

== Early political career ==
He was elected to the King County Council in November 1995, took office in January 1996, and was re-elected in 1999 and 2003. As councilman, he represented Bellevue, Mercer Island, Kirkland, Newcastle, and much of Renton. His re-elections were without opposition and he was twice rated "Outstanding" by the Municipal League.

He also served as 2011-2012 co-chair of the Campaign for Equal Justice.

== Attorney General of Washington ==
As Washington's 17th Attorney General, McKenna managed the largest public law office in the state with approximately 1,150 employees and offices in 13 cities statewide: Bellingham, Port Angeles, Everett, Seattle, Tacoma, Olympia, Wenatchee, Spokane, Yakima, Kennewick, Vancouver, Tumwater, and Pullman. The Washington Attorney General's Office serves over 230 state agencies, boards, commissions, colleges, and universities, as well as the governor and Legislature. As Attorney General, McKenna made the protection of consumers and businesses, the improvement of community safety and the advancement of open government his chief priorities. He also argued before the U.S. Supreme Court three times to defend Washington state laws from challenges, and won each time.

=== 2004 election ===
McKenna based his 2004 campaign for the office of attorney general around three areas of protection he promised to bring to Washingtonians: protection of the safety of families by fighting crimes such as identity theft, internet fraud, and child pornography, and supporting local police, sheriffs, and prosecutors; protection of rights by controlling regulation and supporting the public's right to know what the government is doing; and protection of pocketbooks by counseling state agencies to avoid costly trial and litigation, bringing reform in the matter of reducing what some see as unfair burdens placed on doctors, hospitals, and other professionals.

McKenna developed broad-based alliances to win the election, attracting the support of prosecutors, police chiefs and sheriffs, along with farm and business leaders one at a time and then leveraging those endorsements into broader support. He also built nontraditional alliances with tribal leaders, public safety unions, firefighters and other moderates in both parties. He defeated political novice Mike Vaska, a private attorney from Issaquah, in the Republican primary for state attorney general, with approximately 78 percent of the vote. He defeated former Insurance Commissioner and Democratic Senate candidate Deborah Senn in the November General election and was one of just a few Republicans to win statewide office in 2004.

=== First term ===
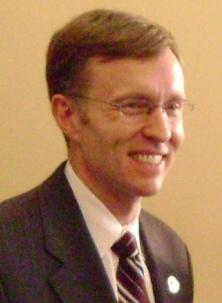
McKenna in 2007

In his first year as attorney general, McKenna founded "Operation: Allied Against Meth", a program designed to reduce the drug's manufacture and use in Washington. The initiative included an increase in the law enforcement and prosecution personnel dedicated to cracking down on methamphetamine-related crimes, a statewide educational program to help prevent the use of the drug, and a legislative alliance devoted to improving Washington's meth problem. Since the initiative began, deaths from methamphetamine use in Washington have fallen by a third, while the incidence of driving under the influence of meth decreased by over 25 percent.

During his inaugural term, he created Washington's Law Enforcement Group against Identity Theft (LEGIT), and was subsequently named as one of Security Magazine's 25 most influential people in security. He was also active in the National Association of Attorneys General (NAAG) during his first term, co-chairing both the Financial Practices Committee and the Tobacco Committee during his first term. Acting in this capacity, he helped lead cases against subprime lenders that resulted in the largest settlements in the history of American consumer protection lawsuits.

=== 2008 election ===
McKenna kicked off his 2008 campaign in November 2007. He received the support of two Democrats, State Auditor Brian Sonntag and Snohomish County Prosecuting Attorney Janice Ellis. He defeated Pierce County Executive John Ladenburg in the 2008 election with over 59 percent of the vote.

=== Second term ===
In his second term, McKenna continued to be active in the National Association of Attorneys General, serving as co-chair on various committees and receiving the NAAG's Distinguished Service Award before becoming Vice-President of the organization in 2009. In 2010, he was elected President of NAAG, and assumed the office on June 22, 2011. He launched his Presidential Initiative, a program called "Pillars of Hope" aimed at reducing human trafficking in the US, in Chicago on the following day.

On March 22, 2010 McKenna announced that he was joining other Republican elected officials in a multi-state challenge to the constitutionality of a health care overhaul bill passed by US Congress and signed by President Obama. The ongoing legal battle grew into a 26 state coalition of plaintiffs, including McKenna, who maintained his original motivation to see the provision for mandatory purchase of private individual health-insurance plans by 2014 struck down for being unconstitutional. McKenna differed from his co-plaintiffs by supporting the law's several provisions pertaining to patient protection; the other opponents wanted the entire law scrapped.

== 2012 gubernatorial election and aftermath ==
In June 2011, McKenna announced that he would run for Governor of Washington. When announcing his gubernatorial campaign, he said "We deserve a governor who will bring us a leaner, better-run state government that doesn't demand endless tax increases before it delivers results to its bosses, you the taxpayers."

McKenna faced Democratic nominee Jay Inslee, a U.S. Representative. Polls showed a close race. Inslee defeated McKenna, winning 52% of the vote. McKenna won 31 of 39 counties, with many of his greatest margins in Washington's most rural areas. Inslee won 62% of the vote in King County, Washington's largest, which proved decisive.

=== Activities since 2012 ===
During the 2016 United States presidential election, McKenna criticized Donald Trump and stated in July 2016 that he would not vote for Trump. In 2021, McKenna joined a lawsuit seeking to invalidate the state's capital gains tax.

== Political positions ==
=== Tax policy ===
McKenna has, on several occasions, defended the "2/3 rule" requiring a two-thirds vote before any tax increases. He opposed I-1098, a ballot initiative to impose state income taxes on households earning more than $400,000. He supports increasing the Business & Occupation (B&O) tax credit to $4,800 per year for small businesses in all categories. Prior to a US Supreme Court ruling allowing such action; McKenna has proposed requiring out-of-state businesses that sell into Washington (including online and mail-order companies) to pay state taxes, even if they lack a physical presence there. Washington began collecting sales tax from out-of-state companies in 2018. On May 20, 2021, McKenna joined a lawsuit against a capital gains tax signed into law by Washington governor and his 2012 gubernatorial opponent Jay Inslee. The lawsuit alleges that the tax is a state income tax in disguise and is unconstitutional due to precedent, with a graduated state income tax being declared unconstitutional in 1933. In September 2021, Douglas County superior court judge Brian Huber allowed this lawsuit to move forward.

=== Education ===
McKenna supports increased funding for colleges and K-12 education. Despite the Washington State Supreme Court decision (McCleary v State of Washington) that found the Washington State government was not meeting its obligation to sufficiently fund public schools, McKenna remains a strong proponent of school choice and charter schools. He wants to end the unfair distribution of education funding, which gives more funding to schools with students that come from wealthier families. In doing this, McKenna hopes to increase class mobility for low-income students.

=== Abortion ===
McKenna is pro-choice, and wants to ensure that all pharmacies sell the morning-after pill. As a general provision, McKenna would support legislation that would require parental notification before a minor obtains an abortion. "I'm like a lot of parents," McKenna said. "When your daughter turns 13 and the mom is kicked out of the examining room for anything related to reproductive health, it's troubling for a lot of parents."

=== Drug policy ===
McKenna opposes drug legalization and he supports strategies to cut down on drug trafficking and trade. He is the founder of "Operation: Allied Against Meth".

== Personal life ==
McKenna has four grown children and resides in Seattle, Washington. An Eagle Scout, he serves on the executive board of the Chief Seattle Council of the Boy Scouts of America, is a past president of the council, and has helped raise hundreds of thousands of dollars for the Bellevue Schools Foundation and the Eastside Domestic Violence Program.

Legal offices
Preceded by Christine Gregoire	Attorney General of Washington; 2005–2013	Succeeded by Bob Ferguson
Party political offices
Preceded by Dino Rossi	Republican nominee for Governor of Washington; 2012	Succeeded by Bill Bryant
