= 2008 Washington Secretary of State election =

2008 Washington secretary of state election
- November 4, 2008
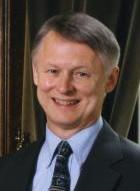

Nominee	Sam Reed	Jason Osgood
Party	Republican	Democratic
Popular vote	1,644,587	1,175,086
Percentage	58.33%	41.67%
- Reed: 50–60% 60–70% 70–80% Osgood: 50–60%
Secretary of State before election
Sam Reed
Republican
Elected Secretary of State
Sam Reed
Republican

The 2008 Washington Secretary of State election was held on Tuesday, November 4, 2008, to elect the Washington Secretary of State, concurrently with the 2008 U.S. presidential election, as well as elections to the U.S. Senate and various state and local elections, including for U.S. House and governor of Washington. Washington is one of two states that holds a top-two primary, meaning that all candidates are listed on the same ballot regardless of party affiliation, and the top two move on to the general election.

Incumbent Republican Secretary of State Sam Reed was re-elected to a third term in office, defeating Democratic challenger Jason Osgood in a landslide. Along with the concurrent attorney general election, this is the last time King County voted Republican in a statewide election against a Democratic opponent. (Note: The 2016 Washington State Treasurer election was contested between 2 Republicans.)

== Candidates ==
=== Republican Party ===
==== Advanced to general ====
- Sam Reed, incumbent secretary of state (2001–2013)

=== Democratic Party ===
==== Advanced to general ====
- Jason Osgood, computer programmer

=== Third-party and independent candidates ===
==== Eliminated in primary ====
- Mark Greene (Party of Commons), perennial candidate
- Marilyn Montgomery (Constitution)

== Primary election ==
=== Endorsements ===
Sam Reed (R)

Newspapers

- The Seattle Times

=== Results ===
County results Reed: 40–50%; 50–60%; 60–70%; 70–80%

Congressional district results Reed: 40–50%; 50–60%; 60–70%

Blanket primary election results
Party	Candidate	Votes	%
Republican	Sam Reed (incumbent)	816,171	59.40
Democratic	Jason Osgood	446,222	32.48
Constitution	Marilyn Montgomery	88,728	6.46
Independent	Mark Greene	22,800	1.66
Total votes		1,373,921	100.00

==== By county ====
County results
County	Sam Reed Republican		Jason Osgood Democratic		Various candidates Other parties		Margin		Total votes
County	#	%	#	%	#	%	#	%	Total votes
Adams	1,896	72.84%	443	17.02%	264	10.14%	1,453	55.82%	2,603
Asotin	2,999	56.86%	1,675	31.76%	600	11.38%	1,324	25.10%	5,274
Benton	26,562	69.16%	8,322	21.67%	3,522	9.17%	18,240	47.49%	38,406
Chelan	11,623	68.35%	3,926	23.09%	1,457	8.57%	7,697	45.26%	17,006
Clallam	13,117	59.69%	7,066	32.15%	1,793	8.16%	6,051	27.53%	21,976
Clark	41,605	57.14%	24,568	33.74%	6,645	9.13%	17,037	23.40%	72,818
Columbia	1,008	69.23%	290	19.92%	158	10.85%	718	49.31%	1,456
Cowlitz	11,347	52.35%	8,156	37.63%	2,174	10.03%	3,191	14.72%	21,677
Douglas	5,862	69.27%	1,860	21.98%	740	8.74%	4,002	47.29%	8,462
Ferry	1,205	60.16%	540	26.96%	258	12.88%	665	33.20%	2,003
Franklin	7,373	67.21%	2,517	22.94%	1,080	9.85%	4,856	44.27%	10,970
Garfield	536	70.53%	144	18.95%	80	10.53%	392	51.58%	760
Grant	9,661	65.05%	3,464	23.32%	1,727	11.63%	6,197	41.73%	14,852
Grays Harbor	9,713	56.71%	6,002	35.04%	1,414	8.26%	3,711	21.67%	17,129
Island	14,657	60.78%	7,562	31.36%	1,895	7.86%	7,095	29.42%	24,114
Jefferson	6,185	48.71%	5,501	43.32%	1,012	7.97%	684	5.39%	12,698
King	193,398	56.58%	128,284	37.53%	20,127	5.89%	65,114	19.05%	341,809
Kitsap	38,168	58.64%	21,738	33.40%	5,178	7.96%	16,430	25.24%	65,084
Kittitas	6,278	64.73%	2,501	25.79%	920	9.49%	3,777	38.94%	9,699
Klickitat	2,816	54.53%	1,805	34.95%	543	10.52%	1,011	19.58%	5,164
Lewis	12,803	66.57%	4,270	22.20%	2,160	11.23%	8,533	44.37%	19,233
Lincoln	2,693	70.66%	712	18.68%	406	10.65%	1,981	51.98%	3,811
Mason	10,282	60.76%	5,193	30.69%	1,447	8.55%	5,089	30.07%	16,922
Okanogan	5,352	61.90%	2,352	27.20%	942	10.90%	3,000	34.70%	8,646
Pacific	3,429	51.47%	2,607	39.13%	626	9.40%	822	12.34%	6,662
Pend Oreille	2,202	58.22%	1,026	27.13%	554	14.65%	1,176	31.09%	3,782
Pierce	87,434	59.92%	47,057	32.25%	11,437	7.84%	40,377	27.67%	145,928
San Juan	3,245	49.93%	2,732	42.04%	522	8.03%	513	7.89%	6,499
Skagit	17,924	60.33%	9,320	31.37%	2,464	8.29%	8,604	28.96%	29,708
Skamania	1,293	53.19%	885	36.40%	253	10.41%	408	16.78%	2,431
Snohomish	80,856	57.13%	48,957	34.59%	11,715	8.28%	31,899	22.54%	141,528
Spokane	62,025	58.27%	32,514	30.55%	11,900	11.18%	29,511	27.73%	106,439
Stevens	7,665	61.64%	2,870	23.08%	1,900	15.28%	4,795	38.56%	12,435
Thurston	43,830	67.55%	16,679	25.71%	4,377	6.75%	27,151	41.84%	64,886
Wahkiakum	822	60.13%	423	30.94%	122	8.92%	399	29.19%	1,367
Walla Walla	8,951	67.05%	3,195	23.93%	1,204	9.02%	5,756	43.12%	13,350
Whatcom	27,304	57.59%	16,705	35.24%	3,400	7.17%	10,599	22.36%	47,409
Whitman	5,091	62.63%	2,369	29.14%	669	8.23%	2,722	33.49%	8,129
Yakima	26,961	66.09%	9,992	24.49%	3,843	9.42%	16,969	41.59%	40,796
Totals	816,171	59.40%	446,222	32.48%	111,528	8.12%	369,949	26.93%	1,373,921

==== By congressional district ====
District	Reed	Osgood	Representative
1st	58%	35%	Jay Inslee
2nd	58%	34%	Rick Larsen
3rd	60%	31%	Brian Baird
4th	67%	24%	Doc Hastings
5th	60%	29%	Cathy McMorris Rodgers
6th	58%	34%	Norm Dicks
7th	49%	46%	Jim McDermott
8th	64%	30%	Dave Reichert
9th	61%	32%	Adam Smith

== General election ==
=== Results ===
2008 Washington Secretary of State election
Party	Candidate	Votes	%	±%
Republican	Sam Reed (incumbent)	1,644,587	58.33%	+6.86%
Democratic	Jason Osgood	1,175,086	41.67%	–3.78%
Total votes		2,819,673	100.00%	N/A
Republican hold				

==== By county ====
County results
County	Sam Reed Republican		Jason Osgood Democratic		Margin		Total votes
County	#	%	#	%	#	%	Total votes
Adams	3,372	74.60%	1,148	25.40%	2,224	49.20%	4,520
Asotin	5,727	62.64%	3,416	37.36%	2,311	25.28%	9,143
Benton	49,619	71.96%	19,330	28.04%	30,289	43.93%	68,949
Chelan	20,913	69.70%	9,093	30.30%	11,820	39.39%	30,006
Clallam	22,048	61.12%	14,025	38.88%	8,023	22.24%	36,073
Clark	97,002	57.02%	73,119	42.98%	23,883	14.04%	170,121
Columbia	1,558	75.08%	517	24.92%	1,041	50.17%	2,075
Cowlitz	22,850	53.90%	19,543	46.10%	3,307	7.80%	42,393
Douglas	10,207	71.12%	4,145	28.88%	6,062	42.24%	14,352
Ferry	2,070	63.34%	1,198	36.66%	872	26.68%	3,268
Franklin	13,009	68.84%	5,889	31.16%	7,120	37.68%	18,898
Garfield	964	76.57%	295	23.43%	669	53.14%	1,259
Grant	17,968	68.83%	8,138	31.17%	9,830	37.65%	26,106
Grays Harbor	15,940	57.67%	11,698	42.33%	4,242	15.35%	27,638
Island	24,352	62.20%	14,802	37.80%	9,550	24.39%	39,154
Jefferson	9,447	50.06%	9,423	49.94%	24	0.13%	18,870
King	432,277	51.88%	400,964	48.12%	31,313	3.76%	833,241
Kitsap	68,976	58.89%	48,153	41.11%	20,823	17.78%	117,129
Kittitas	11,120	66.42%	5,621	33.58%	5,499	32.85%	16,741
Klickitat	5,402	57.09%	4,060	42.91%	1,342	14.18%	9,462
Lewis	22,415	68.40%	10,354	31.60%	12,061	36.81%	32,769
Lincoln	4,147	74.64%	1,409	25.36%	2,738	49.28%	5,556
Mason	16,933	62.55%	10,140	37.45%	6,793	25.09%	27,073
Okanogan	9,818	62.60%	5,865	37.40%	3,953	25.21%	15,683
Pacific	5,423	52.96%	4,817	47.04%	606	5.92%	10,240
Pend Oreille	4,014	65.56%	2,109	34.44%	1,905	31.11%	6,123
Pierce	183,413	59.80%	123,283	40.20%	60,130	19.61%	306,696
San Juan	4,750	48.43%	5,058	51.57%	-308	-3.14%	9,808
Skagit	32,077	61.18%	20,355	38.82%	11,722	22.36%	52,432
Skamania	2,833	55.79%	2,245	44.21%	588	11.58%	5,078
Snohomish	172,173	57.13%	129,193	42.87%	42,980	14.26%	301,366
Spokane	129,876	62.62%	77,532	37.38%	52,344	25.24%	207,408
Stevens	14,077	67.30%	6,839	32.70%	7,238	34.61%	20,916
Thurston	79,212	65.94%	40,915	34.06%	38,297	31.88%	120,127
Wahkiakum	1,260	59.10%	872	40.90%	388	18.20%	2,132
Walla Walla	16,195	70.24%	6,863	29.76%	9,332	40.47%	23,058
Whatcom	53,006	56.49%	40,820	43.51%	12,186	12.99%	93,826
Whitman	10,058	62.04%	6,154	37.96%	3,904	24.08%	16,212
Yakima	48,086	65.18%	25,686	34.82%	22,400	30.36%	73,772
Totals	1,644,587	58.33%	1,175,086	41.67%	469,501	16.65%	2,819,673

Counties that flipped from Democratic to Republican

- Cowlitz (largest city: Longview)
- Jefferson (largest city: Port Townsend)
- King (largest city: Seattle)
- Pacific (largest city: Raymond)

==== By congressional district ====
Reed won eight of nine congressional districts, including five that elected Democrats.

District	Reed	Osgood	Representative
1st	57%	43%	Jay Inslee
2nd	58%	42%	Rick Larsen
3rd	59%	41%	Brian Baird
4th	68%	32%	Doc Hastings
5th	64%	36%	Cathy McMorris Rodgers
6th	58%	42%	Norm Dicks
7th	40%	60%	Jim McDermott
8th	63%	37%	Dave Reichert
9th	59%	41%	Adam Smith
