= 2012 Pierce County Executive election =

- November 6, 2012
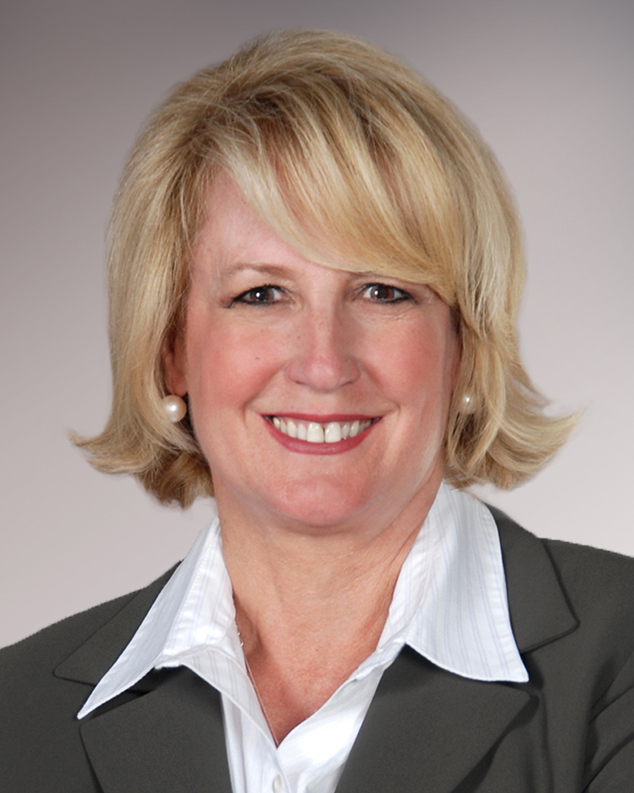

Candidate	Pat McCarthy	Bruce Minker
Party	Democratic	Independent
Popular vote	196,061	108,264
Percentage	64.21%	35.46%
County Executive before election
Pat McCarthy
Democratic
Elected County Executive
Pat McCarthy
Democratic

The 2012 Pierce County Executive election took place on November 6, 2012, to elect the county executive of Pierce County, Washington. Incumbent Democratic County Executive Pat McCarthy ran for re-election to a second term. She was challenged for re-election by independent Bruce Minker, a corrections deputy at the Pierce County Jail.

McCarthy campaigned on her record as County Executive, pointing to her stewardship of the county government budget during the recession, while Minker criticized McCarthy for how she handled a contract dispute with county corrections officers.

In the primary election, McCarthy placed first by a wide margin, winning 64 percent of the vote to Minker's 36 percent. McCarthy won the general election by a similar margin, winning re-election 64–35 percent.

== Primary election ==
=== Candidates ===
- Pat McCarthy, incumbent County Executive (Democratic)
- Bruce Minker, corrections deputy at the Pierce County Jail (independent)

=== Results ===
Primary election results
Party	Candidate	Votes	%
Democratic	Pat McCarthy (inc.)	86,838	63.87%
Independent	Bruce Minker	48,426	35.62%
Write-in		691	0.51%
Total votes		135,955	100.00%

== General election ==
=== Results ===
2012 Pierce County Executive election
Party	Candidate	Votes	%
Democratic	Pat McCarthy (inc.)	196,061	64.21%
Independent	Bruce Minker	108,264	35.46%
Write-in		1,001	0.33%
Total votes		305,326	100.00%
Democratic hold			
