= 2020 Washington Referendum 90 =

Referendum 90
- November 3, 2020
- Washington Comprehensive Sexual Health Education

Results
Choice	Votes	%
Yes	2,283,630	57.82%
No	1,665,906	42.18%
Total votes	3,949,536	100.00%

Yes
80–90%
70–80%
60–70%
50–60%
No
70–80%
60–70%
50–60%

Referendum 90 was a Washington state referendum to approve or reject the March 2020 bill that would mandate that comprehensive sex education is taught in all public schools in the state. On June 24, 2020, state officials announced that enough signatures in favor of the referendum had been submitted and scheduled the referendum to appear on the ballot in the November 3 general election. The law was upheld by voters in the November 3, 2020 election by a final margin of 15.6% (57.8% approve, 42.2% reject). This measure was the nation's first ballot measure pertaining to sex education to be decided by voters.

== Background ==
Senate Bill 5395 was passed by both chambers of the Washington State Legislature, the Washington State Senate and Washington House of Representatives, during the 2020 regular legislative session. It passed each chamber on a party line and required all school districts in the state to teach comprehensive sex education. Governor Jay Inslee signed the bill after it was sent to his desk. Prior to the law passing, each school district was able to decide whether to teach sex education. The law allowed parents or guardians to view materials and opt their students out of any or all of it. Republicans and religious conservatives collected signatures to force a vote on the issue.

== Endorsements ==
Yes

Statewide officials

- Jay Inslee, governor of Washington (2013–2025) (Democratic)

Newspapers

- The Seattle Times
No

Political parties

- Washington State Republican Party

== Polling ==
Poll source	Date(s) administered	Sample size (Note: Key: A – all adults RV – registered voters LV – likely voters V – unclear)	Margin of error	Approve	Reject	Undecided
Public Policy Polling (D) (Note: Poll sponsored by the Northwest Progressive Institute)	October 14–15, 2020	610 (LV)	± 4%	56%	33%	11%
SurveyUSA/KING-TV	October 8–10, 2020	591 (LV)	± 5.2%	52%	34%	14%

== Results ==
Referendum 90 passed with 58% of the vote.

2020 Washington Referendum 90
Choice	Votes	%
For	2,283,630	57.82
Against	1,665,906	42.18
Total	3,949,536	100.00
Source: Washington Secretary of State

=== By county ===
County results
County	Yes		No		Margin		Total votes
County	#	%	#	%	#	%	Total votes
Adams	1,768	30.94%	3,947	69.06%	-2,179	-38.13%	5,715
Asotin	5,559	48.20%	5,974	51.80%	-415	-3.60%	11,533
Benton	37,867	37.53%	63,043	62.47%	-25,176	-24.95%	100,910
Chelan	19,244	47.48%	21,285	52.52%	-2,041	-5.04%	40,529
Clallam	24,246	51.92%	22,452	48.08%	1,794	3.84%	46,698
Clark	144,843	56.92%	109,618	43.08%	35,225	13.84%	254,461
Columbia	789	32.44%	1,643	67.56%	-854	-35.12%	2,432
Cowlitz	25,409	43.34%	33,212	56.66%	-7,803	-13.31%	58,621
Douglas	8,390	40.36%	12,399	59.64%	-4,009	-19.28%	20,789
Ferry	1,399	33.22%	2,812	66.78%	-1,413	-33.55%	4,211
Franklin	11,952	37.74%	19,717	62.26%	-7,765	-24.52%	31,669
Garfield	435	30.21%	1,005	69.79%	-570	-39.58%	1,440
Grant	11,768	32.77%	24,145	67.23%	-12,377	-34.46%	35,913
Grays Harbor	16,456	44.14%	20,826	55.86%	-4,370	-11.72%	37,282
Island	28,459	54.62%	23,640	45.38%	4,819	9.25%	52,099
Jefferson	16,433	68.47%	7,567	31.53%	8,866	36.94%	24,000
King	853,102	73.19%	312,424	26.81%	540,678	46.39%	1,165,526
Kitsap	89,068	57.74%	65,178	42.26%	23,890	15.49%	154,246
Kittitas	12,224	48.17%	13,152	51.83%	-928	-3.66%	25,376
Klickitat	6,067	47.82%	6,619	52.18%	-552	-4.35%	12,686
Lewis	14,515	32.72%	29,847	67.28%	-15,332	-34.56%	44,362
Lincoln	1,780	25.82%	5,115	74.18%	-3,335	-48.37%	6,895
Mason	17,095	47.10%	19,202	52.90%	-2,107	-5.80%	36,297
Okanogan	8,986	43.33%	11,753	56.67%	-2,767	-13.34%	20,739
Pacific	6,677	48.97%	6,959	51.03%	-282	-2.07%	13,636
Pend Oreille	2,757	33.05%	5,584	66.95%	-2,827	-33.89%	8,341
Pierce	239,142	52.85%	213,379	47.15%	25,763	5.69%	452,521
San Juan	9,176	72.16%	3,540	27.84%	5,636	44.32%	12,716
Skagit	36,629	51.51%	34,482	48.49%	2,147	3.02%	71,111
Skamania	3,477	49.38%	3,564	50.62%	-87	-1.24%	7,041
Snohomish	239,765	56.10%	187,600	43.90%	52,165	12.21%	427,365
Spokane	134,160	46.37%	155,180	53.63%	-21,020	-7.26%	289,340
Stevens	7,857	28.40%	19,813	71.60%	-11,956	-43.21%	27,670
Thurston	93,864	57.56%	69,219	42.44%	24,645	15.11%	163,083
Wahkiakum	1,265	43.58%	1,638	56.42%	-373	-12.85%	2,903
Walla Walla	14,988	49.41%	15,347	50.59%	-359	-1.18%	30,335
Whatcom	81,015	59.91%	54,207	40.09%	26,808	19.83%	135,222
Whitman	11,697	56.59%	8,974	43.41%	2,723	13.17%	20,671
Yakima	43,307	46.49%	49,845	53.51%	-6,538	-7.02%	93,152
Totals	2,283,630	57.82%	1,665,906	42.18%	617,724	15.64%	3,949,536

=== By congressional district ===
"Yes" won eight of ten congressional districts, including one that elected a Republican.

District	Yes	No	Representative
1st	57%	43%	Suzan DelBene
2nd	60%	40%	Rick Larsen
3rd	51%	49%	Jaime Herrera Beutler
4th	40%	60%	Dan Newhouse
5th	45%	55%	Cathy McMorris Rodgers
6th	57%	43%	Derek Kilmer
7th	83%	17%	Pramila Jayapal
8th	52%	48%	Kim Schrier
9th	71%	29%	Adam Smith
10th	55%	45%	Denny Heck (116th Congress)
10th	55%	45%	Marilyn Strickland (117th Congress)

== Notes ==
Partisan clients
