= 2012 Washington Initiative 1240 =

Referendum that created a public charter school system

Initiative 1240
- A measure establishing a public charter school system not to exceed forty schools over the next five years.

Results
Choice	Votes	%
Yes	1,525,807	50.69%
No	1,484,125	49.31%
Valid votes	3,009,932	100.00%
Invalid or blank votes	0	0.00%
Total votes	3,009,932	100.00%

Yes
90–100%
80–90%
70–80%
60–70%
50–60%
No
90–100%
80–90%
70–80%
60–70%
50–60%
Other
Tie
No data

Washington Initiative 1240 "concerns creation of a public charter school system" was an initiative that appeared on the Washington state general ballot in November 2012. Originally filed with the Washington Secretary of State on May 31, proponents and paid signature gatherers collected enough signatures to be certified for the ballot on July 25, making it one of the fastest initiatives ever to do so, at an estimated cost of more than $6 per signature. Proposed charter schools would receive public funding but not be governed by local school districts. An August 2012 financial impact study by the state Office of Financial Management estimated "an indeterminate, but non-zero, fiscal impact to local public school districts" and "known state agency implementation costs" of at least $3 million in the first five years. The initiative was approved by voters in November 2012.

== Ballot measure title and summary ==
The full text of the measure is available online.

Language describing I-1240 was challenged in court. As described by the Secretary of State's office, I-1240 "would authorize up to forty publicly-funded charter schools open to all students, operated through approved, nonreligious, nonprofit organizations, with government oversight; and modify certain laws applicable to them as public schools."

This measure would allow a newly-created state commission or approved local school boards to authorize qualifying nonreligious, nonprofit organizations to operate public charter schools, limited to forty schools over five years. Public charter schools would receive standard per-student public school funding and be open to all students without tuition. Public charter schools would be subject to teacher certification requirements, government oversight, and performance reporting requirements, but exempt from certain state laws and school district policies.

== Support and Opposition ==
Washington voters previously rejected charter school measures. Beginning with I-177 in 1996, then I-729 in 2000 and Referendum 55 in 2004. Each of these proposals was brought forward by a few wealthy individuals and actively opposed by public school teachers, administrators and parent groups. Republican gubernatorial candidate Rob McKenna supported the measure, while Democratic opponent Jay Inslee opposed it. As per RCW 42.17A on "campaign disclosure and contribution," the Washington state Public Disclosure Commission posts campaign information online, including committee and donor information for referendums and initiatives As of August, 2012, PDC records show proponents of I-1240 with a nearly 50:1 fundraising advantage.

Statements for and against each ballot measure are available online as part of the official online voter's guide.

=== Support ===
The registered sponsor for the initiative was the League of Education Voters. I-1240 campaign was funded partly by a "handful" of Puget Sound area billionaires, including Bill Gates, Paul Allen and the parents of Jeff Bezos. Alice Walton was also among the top five contributors. The measure was also endorsed by Stand for Children.

=== Opposition ===
The League of Women Voters of Washington opposed the measure, as did the Washington Education Association and the Washington Association of School Administrators. The National Association for the Advancement of Colored People has been opposed to all charter schools since 2010, and, although the National Parent Teacher Association conditionally supports charter schools, the Washington State PTA opposed I-1240 for not meeting "criteria for local oversight." A variety of Democratic organizations and officials oppose I-1240.

== Results ==
Voters approved Initiative 1240 at the ballot box. The statewide vote to approve the measure was 50.69%; the vote to reject was 49.31%.

2012 Washington Initiative 1240
Choice	Votes	%
For	1,525,807	50.69
Against	1,484,125	49.31
Total	3,009,932	100.00
Source: Washington Secretary of State

=== By county ===
County results
County	Yes		No		Margin		Total votes
County	#	%	#	%	#	%	Total votes
Adams	2,189	47.18%	2,451	52.82%	-262	-5.65%	4,640
Asotin	4,079	43.07%	5,392	56.93%	-1,313	-13.86%	9,471
Benton	39,659	51.13%	37,906	48.87%	1,753	2.26%	77,565
Chelan	16,849	53.84%	14,445	46.16%	2,404	7.68%	31,294
Clallam	19,856	53.84%	17,024	46.16%	2,832	7.68%	36,880
Clark	94,814	52.33%	86,370	47.67%	8,444	4.66%	181,184
Columbia	1,080	49.29%	1,111	50.71%	-31	-1.41%	2,191
Cowlitz	20,426	47.44%	22,631	52.56%	-2,205	-5.12%	43,057
Douglas	7,347	50.69%	7,147	49.31%	200	1.38%	14,494
Ferry	1,637	48.72%	1,723	51.28%	-86	-2.56%	3,360
Franklin	11,511	51.73%	10,739	48.27%	772	3.47%	22,250
Garfield	511	41.61%	717	58.39%	-206	-16.78%	1,228
Grant	13,523	50.47%	13,272	40.53%	251	0.94%	26,795
Grays Harbor	13,985	49.49%	14,272	50.51%	-287	-1.02%	28,257
Island	22,096	53.98%	18,838	46.02%	3,258	7.96%	40,934
Jefferson	9,047	47.13%	10,148	52.87%	-1,101	-5.74%	19,195
King	442,195	48.41%	471,316	51.59%	-29,121	-3.19%	913,511
Kitsap	62,776	51.97%	58,008	48.03%	4,768	3.95%	120,784
Kittitas	8,859	50.45%	8,700	49.55%	159	0.91%	17,559
Klickitat	4,611	46.54%	5,296	53.46%	-685	-6.91%	9,907
Lewis	18,344	54.88%	15,081	45.12%	3,263	9.76%	33,425
Lincoln	2,604	45.66%	3,099	54.34%	-495	-8.68%	5,703
Mason	15,464	56.23%	12,035	43.77%	3,429	12.47%	27,499
Okanogan	7,511	46.20%	8,748	53.80%	-1,237	-7.61%	16,259
Pacific	5,162	50.82%	4,996	49.18%	166	1.63%	10,158
Pend Oreille	3,236	49.48%	3,304	50.52%	-68	-1.04%	6,540
Pierce	183,370	54.76%	151,511	45.24%	31,859	9.51%	334,881
San Juan	4,487	44.22%	5,661	55.78%	-1,174	-11.57%	10,148
Skagit	26,674	49.66%	27,043	50.34%	-369	-0.69%	53,717
Skamania	2,754	52.55%	2,487	47.45%	267	5.09%	5,241
Snohomish	170,881	53.20%	150,314	46.80%	20,567	6.40%	321,195
Spokane	108,942	49.86%	109,534	50.14%	-592	-0.27%	218,476
Stevens	10,292	47.16%	11,530	52.84%	-1,238	-5.67%	21,822
Thurston	61,675	50.19%	61,217	49.81%	458	0.37%	122,892
Wahkiakum	955	44.17%	1,207	55.83%	-252	-11.66%	2,162
Walla Walla	12,164	49.76%	12,280	50.24%	-116	-0.47%	24,444
Whatcom	48,109	48.50%	51,089	51.50%	-2,980	-3.01%	99,168
Whitman	7,425	45.01%	9,070	54.99%	-1,645	-9.97%	16,495
Yakima	38,708	51.53%	36,413	48.47%	2,295	3.06%	75,121
Totals	1,525,807	50.69%	1,484,125	49.31%	41,682	1.38%	3,009,932

== See also ==
- Charter schools
