= 2004 Pierce County Executive election =

- November 2, 2004

Nominee	John Ladenburg	Greg Bakamis
Party	Democratic	Republican
Popular vote	175,583	112,221
Percentage	60.92%	38.93%
County Executive before election
John Ladenburg
Democratic
Elected County Executive
John Ladenburg
Democratic

The 2004 Pierce County Executive election took place on November 2, 2004. The election took place following the invalidation of Washington's blanket primary and used separate primaries for the first time.

Incumbent Democratic County Executive John Ladenburg ran for re-election to a second term. He was unopposed in the Democratic primary and faced casino manager Greg Bakamis, the Republican nominee, in the general election. Ladenburg was endorsed by the News Tribune, which noted that, because Ladenburg "has become a regional leader on transportation and other issues," the election was a "no-contest[] race" Ladenburg ultimately defeated Bakamis in a landslide, winning re-election with 61 percent of the vote.

== Democratic primary ==
=== Candidates ===
- John Ladenburg, incumbent County Executive

=== Results ===
Democratic primary results
Party	Candidate	Votes	%
Democratic	John Ladenburg (inc.)	71,964	99.22%
Democratic	Write-ins	569	0.78%
Total votes		72,533	100.00%

== Republican primary ==
=== Candidates ===
- Greg Bakamis, casino manager

=== Results ===
Republican primary results
Party	Candidate	Votes	%
Republican	Greg Bakamis	45,014	99.57%
Republican	Write-ins	193	0.43%
Total votes		45,207	100.00%

== Libertarian primary ==
=== Candidates ===
No candidates filed for the Libertarian nomination.

=== Results ===
Libertarian primary results
Party	Candidate	Votes	%
Libertarian	Write-ins	230	100.00%
Total votes		230	100.00%

== General election ==
=== Results ===
2004 Pierce County Executive election
Party	Candidate	Votes	%
Democratic	John Ladenburg (inc.)	175,583	60.92%
Republican	Greg Bakamis	112,221	38.93%
Write-in		432	0.15%
Total votes		288,236	100.00%
Democratic hold			
