= 2024 Washington State Auditor election =

- November 5, 2024
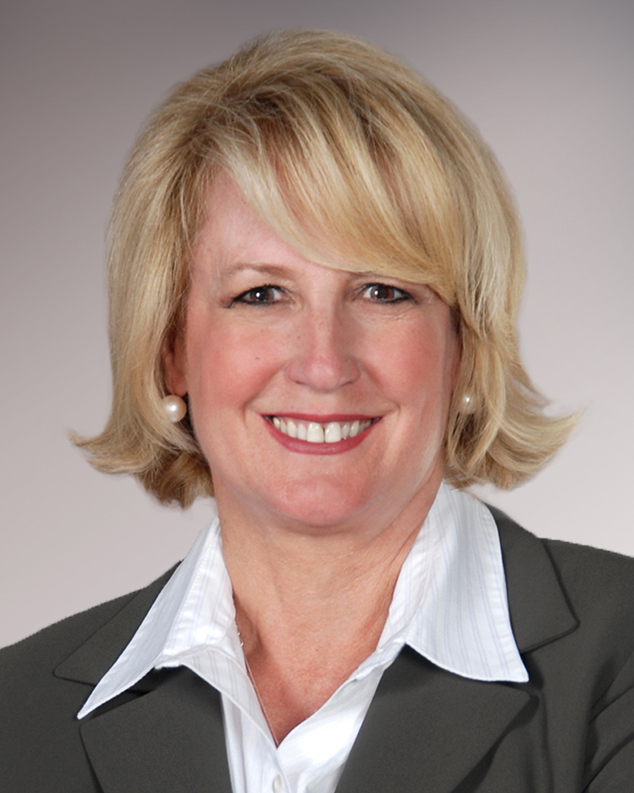

Nominee	Pat McCarthy	Matt Hawkins
Party	Democratic	Republican
Popular vote	2,170,306	1,568,750
Percentage	57.99%	41.92%
- McCarthy: 40–50% 50–60% 60–70% 70–80% 80–90% >90% Hawkins: 40–50% 50–60% 60–70% 70–80% 80–90% >90% Tie: 40–50% 50% No votes
State Auditor before election
Pat McCarthy
Democratic
Elected State Auditor
Pat McCarthy
Democratic

The 2024 Washington State Auditor election was held on November 5, 2024, to elect the Washington State Auditor, concurrently with the 2024 U.S. presidential election, as well as elections to the U.S. Senate and various state and local elections, including for U.S. House and governor of Washington. Washington is one of two states that holds a top-two primary, meaning that all candidates are listed on the same ballot regardless of party affiliation, and the top two move on to the general election.

Incumbent Democratic State Auditor Pat McCarthy was re-elected to a third term.

Primary elections took place on August 6, 2024.

== Primary election ==
=== Democratic Party ===
==== Advanced to general ====
- Pat McCarthy, incumbent state auditor (2017–present)

=== Republican Party ===
==== Advanced to general ====
- Matt Hawkins, business consultant and candidate for U.S. Senate in 2018

=== Results ===
County results McCarthy: 50–60%; 60–70%; 70–80%; Hawkins: 50–60%; 60–70%; 70–80%

Congressional district results McCarthy: 50–60%; 60–70%; 70–80%; 80–90%; Hawkins: 50–60%; 60–70%

Blanket primary results
Party	Candidate	Votes	%
Democratic	Pat McCarthy (incumbent)	1,125,904	58.82%
Republican	Matt Hawkins	786,529	41.09%
Write-in		1,648	0.09%
Total votes		1,914,081	100.00%

==== By county ====
County	Pat McCarthy Democratic		Matt Hawkins Republican		Write-in Various		Margin		Total
County	#	%	#	%	#	%	#	%	Total
Adams	578	23.80%	1,849	76.12%	2	0.08%	-1,271	-52.33%	2,429
Asotin	2,155	38.29%	3,467	61.60%	6	0.11%	-1,312	-23.31%	5,628
Benton	18,300	37.19%	30,868	62.73%	40	0.08%	-12,568	-25.54%	49,208
Chelan	8,768	40.53%	12,851	59.41%	12	0.06%	-4,083	-18.88%	21,631
Clallam	16,250	56.99%	12,239	42.93%	23	0.08%	4,011	14.07%	28,512
Clark	70,739	53.46%	61,478	46.46%	105	0.08%	9,261	7.00%	132,322
Columbia	331	26.02%	940	73.90%	1	0.08%	-609	-47.88%	1,272
Cowlitz	11,704	40.77%	16,976	59.14%	26	0.09%	-5,272	-18.37%	28,706
Douglas	3,324	30.78%	7,466	69.14%	9	0.08%	-4,142	-38.36%	10,799
Ferry	727	31.03%	1,613	68.84%	3	0.13%	-886	-37.81%	2,343
Franklin	4,689	33.69%	9,217	66.22%	12	0.09%	-4,528	-32.53%	13,918
Garfield	151	20.71%	578	79.29%	0	0.00%	-427	-58.57%	729
Grant	4,234	25.82%	12,152	74.10%	13	0.08%	-7,918	-48.28%	16,399
Grays Harbor	9,110	47.55%	10,031	52.36%	18	0.09%	-921	-4.81%	19,159
Island	16,962	56.98%	12,772	42.91%	34	0.11%	4,190	14.08%	29,768
Jefferson	11,706	75.26%	3,842	24.70%	7	0.05%	7,864	50.56%	15,555
King	407,039	76.13%	127,197	23.79%	451	0.08%	279,842	52.34%	534,687
Kitsap	50,350	61.17%	31,907	38.76%	61	0.07%	18,443	22.40%	82,318
Kittitas	4,544	38.90%	7,134	61.07%	4	0.03%	-2,590	-22.17%	11,682
Klickitat	3,257	44.24%	4,099	55.68%	6	0.08%	-842	-11.44%	7,362
Lewis	7,114	30.32%	16,305	69.49%	44	0.19%	-9,191	-39.17%	23,463
Lincoln	888	22.80%	3,007	77.20%	0	0.00%	-2,119	-54.40%	3,895
Mason	9,335	48.15%	10,028	51.73%	23	0.12%	-693	-3.57%	19,386
Okanogan	4,801	41.06%	6,878	58.83%	13	0.11%	-2,077	-17.76%	11,692
Pacific	3,917	48.87%	4,085	50.97%	13	0.16%	-168	-2.10%	8,015
Pend Oreille	1,434	32.47%	2,976	67.39%	6	0.14%	-1,542	-34.92%	4,416
Pierce	114,884	55.57%	91,679	44.34%	182	0.09%	23,205	11.22%	206,745
San Juan	5,892	76.51%	1,805	23.44%	4	0.05%	4,087	53.07%	7,701
Skagit	20,192	56.10%	15,783	43.85%	17	0.05%	4,409	12.25%	35,992
Skamania	1,782	44.71%	2,201	55.22%	3	0.08%	-419	-10.51%	3,986
Snohomish	117,033	59.57%	79,246	40.34%	171	0.09%	37,787	19.23%	196,450
Spokane	66,811	47.61%	73,373	52.28%	155	0.11%	-6,562	-4.68%	140,339
Stevens	4,329	28.04%	11,099	71.88%	13	0.08%	-6,770	-43.84%	15,441
Thurston	52,496	61.86%	32,289	38.05%	71	0.08%	20,207	23.81%	84,856
Wahkiakum	751	43.11%	990	56.83%	1	0.06%	-239	-13.72%	1,742
Walla Walla	6,298	43.65%	8,127	56.33%	3	0.02%	-1,829	-12.68%	14,428
Whatcom	42,736	60.95%	27,336	38.99%	45	0.06%	15,400	21.96%	70,117
Whitman	4,281	47.33%	4,756	52.58%	8	0.09%	-475	-5.25%	9,045
Yakima	16,012	38.17%	25,890	61.72%	43	0.10%	-9,878	-23.55%	41,945
Totals	1,125,904	58.82%	786,529	41.09%	1,648	0.09%	339,375	17.73%	1,914,081

==== By congressional district ====
District	McCarthy	Hawkins	Representative
1st	64%	36%	Suzan DelBene
2nd	62%	38%	Rick Larsen
3rd	48%	52%	Marie Gluesenkamp Perez
4th	36%	64%	Dan Newhouse
5th	44%	56%	Cathy McMorris Rodgers
6th	61%	39%	Derek Kilmer
7th	88%	12%	Pramila Jayapal
8th	51%	49%	Kim Schrier
9th	72%	28%	Adam Smith
10th	60%	40%	Marilyn Strickland

== General election ==
=== Endorsements ===
Pat McCarthy (D)

Newspapers

- The Seattle Times

=== Polling ===
Poll source	Date(s) administered	Sample size (Note: Key: A – all adults RV – registered voters LV – likely voters V – unclear)	Margin of error	Pat McCarthy (D)	Matt Hawkins (R)	Undecided
Public Policy Polling (D) (Note: Poll sponsored by the Northwest Progressive Institute)	July 24–25, 2024	581 (LV)	± 4.0%	43%	33%	24%

=== Results ===
2024 Washington State Auditor election
Party	Candidate	Votes	%	±%
Democratic	Pat McCarthy (incumbent)	2,170,306	57.99%	–0.01%
Republican	Matt Hawkins	1,568,750	41.92%	–
Write-in		3,262	0.09%	–
Total votes		3,742,318	100.00%	N/A
Democratic hold				

==== By county ====
County	Pat McCarthy Democratic		Matt Hawkins Republican		Write-in Various		Margin		Total
County	#	%	#	%	#	%	#	%	Total
Adams	1,396	27.12%	3,742	72.69%	10	0.19%	-2,346	-45.57%	5,148
Asotin	4,028	36.76%	6,918	63.13%	12	0.11%	-2,890	-26.37%	10,958
Benton	36,916	38.18%	59,706	61.75%	74	0.08%	-22,790	-23.57%	96,696
Chelan	17,099	42.56%	23,043	57.35%	37	0.09%	-5,944	-14.79%	40,179
Clallam	24,850	53.22%	21,805	46.70%	39	0.08%	3,045	6.52%	46,694
Clark	138,981	53.05%	122,713	46.84%	311	0.12%	16,268	6.21%	262,005
Columbia	643	27.10%	1,727	72.78%	3	0.13%	-1,084	-45.68%	2,373
Cowlitz	22,733	39.94%	34,141	59.99%	40	0.07%	-11,408	-20.04%	56,914
Douglas	7,022	34.51%	13,310	65.42%	15	0.07%	-6,288	-30.90%	20,347
Ferry	1,282	32.31%	2,685	67.67%	1	0.03%	-1,403	-35.36%	3,968
Franklin	11,847	38.51%	18,901	61.43%	19	0.06%	-7,054	-22.93%	30,767
Garfield	307	23.44%	1,003	76.56%	0	0.00%	-696	-53.13%	1,310
Grant	10,493	30.22%	24,217	69.74%	17	0.05%	-13,724	-39.52%	34,727
Grays Harbor	16,878	46.70%	19,228	53.21%	33	0.09%	-2,350	-6.50%	36,139
Island	28,362	56.32%	21,938	43.56%	60	0.12%	6,424	12.76%	50,360
Jefferson	17,286	71.91%	6,742	28.05%	10	0.04%	10,544	43.86%	24,038
King	798,894	74.44%	273,370	25.47%	898	0.08%	525,524	48.97%	1,073,162
Kitsap	88,512	58.82%	61,848	41.10%	124	0.08%	26,664	17.72%	150,484
Kittitas	10,204	40.64%	14,877	59.25%	27	0.11%	-4,673	-18.61%	25,108
Klickitat	5,777	44.39%	7,226	55.52%	11	0.08%	-1,449	-11.13%	13,014
Lewis	14,115	32.46%	29,335	67.46%	35	0.08%	-15,220	-35.00%	43,485
Lincoln	1,595	23.03%	5,321	76.84%	9	0.13%	-3,726	-53.81%	6,925
Mason	16,848	47.78%	18,374	52.10%	43	0.12%	-1,526	-4.33%	35,265
Okanogan	8,382	42.01%	11,556	57.91%	16	0.08%	-3,174	-15.91%	19,954
Pacific	6,744	49.35%	6,910	50.56%	13	0.10%	-166	-1.21%	13,667
Pend Oreille	2,479	29.98%	5,776	69.84%	15	0.18%	-3,297	-39.87%	8,270
Pierce	231,143	54.89%	189,549	45.01%	388	0.09%	41,594	9.88%	421,080
San Juan	9,142	74.45%	3,121	25.42%	17	0.14%	6,021	49.03%	12,280
Skagit	35,344	53.00%	31,301	46.93%	46	0.07%	4,043	6.06%	66,691
Skamania	3,088	44.13%	3,906	55.82%	4	0.06%	-818	-11.69%	6,998
Snohomish	228,289	57.85%	165,975	42.06%	326	0.08%	62,314	15.79%	394,590
Spokane	126,979	46.17%	147,902	53.77%	166	0.06%	-20,923	-7.61%	275,047
Stevens	7,412	27.02%	19,998	72.89%	25	0.09%	-12,586	-45.88%	27,435
Thurston	93,958	59.56%	63,658	40.35%	142	0.09%	30,300	19.21%	157,758
Wahkiakum	1,191	40.82%	1,724	59.08%	3	0.10%	-533	-18.27%	2,918
Walla Walla	12,705	44.47%	15,850	55.48%	13	0.05%	-3,145	-11.01%	28,568
Whatcom	81,199	61.42%	50,924	38.52%	75	0.06%	30,275	22.90%	132,198
Whitman	10,113	52.54%	9,121	47.38%	16	0.08%	992	5.15%	19,250
Yakima	36,070	42.16%	49,309	57.64%	169	0.20%	-13,239	-15.48%	85,548
Totals	2,170,306	57.99%	1,568,750	41.92%	3,262	0.09%	601,556	16.07%	3,742,318

==== By congressional district ====
McCarthy won seven of ten congressional districts, with the remaining three going to Hawkins, including one that elected a Democrat.

District	McCarthy	Hawkins	Representative
1st	62%	38%	Suzan DelBene
2nd	60%	39%	Rick Larsen
3rd	48%	52%	Marie Gluesenkamp Perez
4th	39%	61%	Dan Newhouse
5th	43%	57%	Cathy McMorris Rodgers (118th Congress)
5th	43%	57%	Michael Baumgartner (119th Congress)
6th	59%	41%	Derek Kilmer (118th Congress)
6th	59%	41%	Emily Randall (119th Congress)
7th	86%	13%	Pramila Jayapal
8th	51%	49%	Kim Schrier
9th	70%	30%	Adam Smith
10th	59%	41%	Marilyn Strickland

== Notes ==
Partisan clients
