= 2008 Washington Initiative 1029 =

Ballot measure in Washington relating to care workers

Initiative 1029
- Concerning the requirements for long-term home healthcare workers

Results
Choice	Votes	%
Yes	2,113,773	72.53%
No	800,733	27.47%
Total votes	2,914,506	100.00%

Yes:
60–70%
70–80%

Washington Initiative 1029 (2008) was an initiative concerning long-term home health-care workers, approved in the Washington state general election of November 4, 2008. It required "long-term care workers to be certified as home care aides based on an examination, with exceptions; increase training and criminal background check requirements; and establish disciplinary standards and procedures."

== Results ==
Initiative 1029 was approved with 73% of the vote.

2008 Washington Initiative 1029
Choice	Votes	%
For	2,113,773	72.53
Against	800,733	27.47
Total	2,914,506	100.00
Source: Washington Secretary of State

=== By county ===
County results
County	Yes		No		Margin		Total votes
County	#	%	#	%	#	%	Total votes
Adams	3,201	71.42%	1,281	28.58%	1,920	42.84%	4,482
Asotin	7,011	73.19%	2,568	26.81%	4,443	46.38%	9,579
Benton	47,988	67.08%	23,555	32.92%	24,433	34.15%	71,543
Chelan	21,853	71.56%	8,687	28.44%	13,166	43.11%	30,540
Clallam	26,903	73.11%	9,893	26.89%	17,010	46.23%	36,796
Clark	126,081	71.79%	49,539	28.21%	76,542	43.58%	175,620
Columbia	1,299	60.08%	863	39.92%	436	20.17%	2,162
Cowlitz	32,446	73.65%	11,606	26.35%	20,840	47.31%	44,052
Douglas	10,649	72.27%	4,087	27.73%	6,562	44.53%	14,736
Ferry	2,252	68.14%	1,053	31.86%	1,199	36.28%	3,305
Franklin	13,064	68.13%	6,112	31.87%	6,952	36.25%	19,176
Garfield	818	63.31%	474	36.69%	344	26.63%	1,292
Grant	19,286	72.06%	7,477	27.94%	11,809	44.12%	26,763
Grays Harbor	22,044	76.67%	6,708	23.33%	15,336	53.34%	28,752
Island	30,897	75.54%	10,007	24.46%	20,890	51.07%	40,904
Jefferson	14,333	74.22%	4,978	25.78%	9,355	48.44%	19,311
King	618,674	71.26%	249,526	28.74%	369,148	42.52%	868,200
Kitsap	89,125	73.83%	31,588	26.17%	57,537	47.66%	120,713
Kittitas	12,307	71.27%	4,962	28.73%	7,345	42.53%	17,269
Klickitat	6,743	69.07%	3,019	30.93%	3,724	38.15%	9,762
Lewis	24,878	73.75%	8,854	26.25%	16,024	47.50%	33,732
Lincoln	3,832	66.70%	1,913	33.30%	1,919	33.40%	5,745
Mason	20,658	74.66%	7,012	25.34%	13,646	49.32%	27,670
Okanogan	11,233	68.82%	5,089	31.18%	6,144	37.64%	16,322
Pacific	7,797	75.48%	2,533	24.52%	5,264	50.96%	10,330
Pend Oreille	4,580	71.71%	1,807	28.29%	2,773	43.42%	6,387
Pierce	244,329	76.32%	75,823	23.68%	168,506	52.63%	320,152
San Juan	6,753	67.94%	3,186	32.06%	3,567	35.89%	9,939
Skagit	38,501	72.03%	14,954	27.97%	23,547	44.05%	53,455
Skamania	3,778	71.39%	1,514	28.61%	2,264	42.78%	5,292
Snohomish	230,387	74.83%	77,473	25.17%	152,914	49.67%	307,860
Spokane	159,886	74.24%	55,465	25.76%	104,421	48.49%	215,351
Stevens	14,449	65.84%	7,497	34.16%	6,952	31.68%	21,946
Thurston	89,570	72.98%	33,155	27.02%	56,415	45.97%	122,725
Wahkiakum	1,565	70.18%	665	29.82%	900	40.36%	2,230
Walla Walla	16,370	68.57%	7,503	31.43%	8,867	37.14%	23,873
Whatcom	64,255	67.66%	30,717	32.34%	33,538	35.31%	94,972
Whitman	11,626	68.56%	5,332	31.44%	6,294	37.12%	16,958
Yakima	52,352	70.17%	22,258	29.83%	30,094	40.34%	74,610
Totals	2,113,773	72.53%	800,733	27.47%	1,313,040	45.05%	2,914,506
