= 2013 King County Executive election =

- November 5, 2013
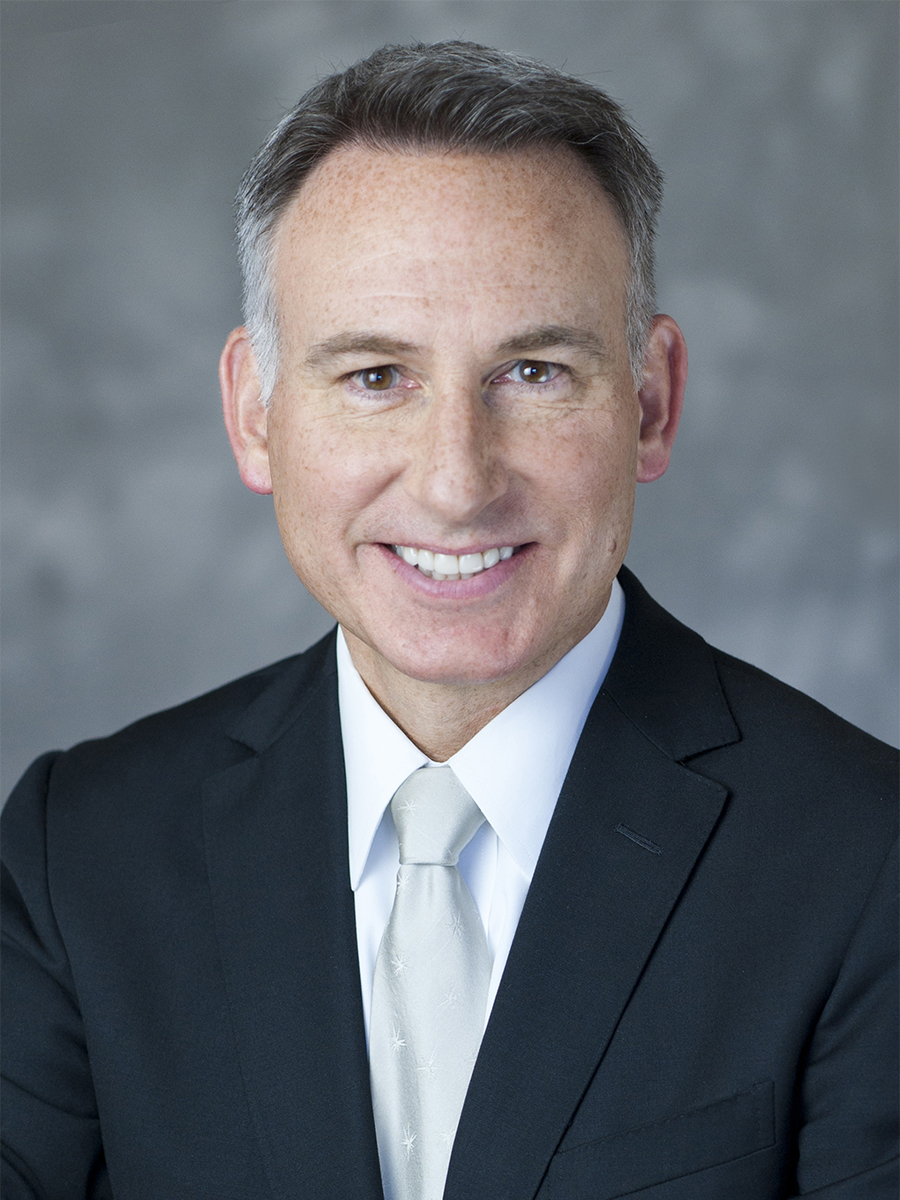

Candidate	Dow Constantine	Alan E. Lobdell
Party	Nonpartisan	Nonpartisan
Popular vote	370,838	101,724
Percentage	78.16%	21.44%
County Executive before election
Dow Constantine
Nonpartisan
Elected County Executive
Dow Constantine
Nonpartisan

The 2013 King County Executive election took place on November 5, 2013, following a primary on August 6, 2013. Incumbent County Executive Dow Constantine ran for re-election to a second term. He faced little-known opponents, including perennial candidates Alan Lobdell and Goodspaceguy, and placed first in the primary with 77 percent of the vote. Lobdell, who placed second with 12 percent, advanced to the general election. Constantine defeated Lobdell in a landslide, winning his second term, 78-21 percent.

== Primary election ==
=== Candidates ===
- Dow Constantine, incumbent County Executive
- Alan E. Lobdell, civil engineer, perennial candidate
- Everett Stewart, King County Metro operator
- Goodspaceguy, perennial candidate

=== Results ===
2013 King County Executive primary election
Party	Candidate	Votes	%
Nonpartisan	Dow Constantine (inc.)	236,705	76.52%
Nonpartisan	Alan E. Lobdell	36,967	11.95%
Nonpartisan	Everett A. Stewart	21,656	7.00%
Nonpartisan	Goodspaceguy	12,369	4.00%
Write-in		1,642	0.53%
Total votes		309,339	100.00%

== General election ==
=== Results ===
2013 King County Executive election
Party	Candidate	Votes	%
Nonpartisan	Dow Constantine (inc.)	370,838	78.16%
Nonpartisan	Alan E. Lobdell	101,724	21.44%
Write-in		1,877	0.40%
Total votes		474,439	100.00%
