= 2018 Washington Initiative 1634 =

- November 6, 2018

Results
Choice	Votes	%
Yes	1,721,487	55.88%
No	1,359,240	44.12%

Yes
70–80%
60–70%
50–60%
No
60–70%
50–60%

Initiative Measure No. 1634 was a ballot initiative in the State of Washington to prohibit local governments from enacting taxes on groceries, including taxes on soda.

== Content ==
The ballot title appeared as follows:

Initiative Measure No. 1634 concerns taxation of certain items intended for human consumption.

This measure would prohibit new or increased local taxes, fees, or assessments on raw or processed foods or beverages (with exceptions), or ingredients thereof, unless effective by January 15, 2018, or generally applicable.

Should this measure be enacted into law?

== Campaigns ==
=== Support ===
The initiative was supported by the Yes! To Affordable Groceries coalition. It was endorsed by the lobbying arm of Citizens Against Government Waste.

=== Opposition ===
The initiative was opposed by the editorial boards of The Columbian, The Olympian, and The News Tribune.

== Results ==
Initiative 1634 passed with 56% of the vote.

2018 Washington Initiative 1634
Choice	Votes	%
For	1,721,487	55.88
Against	1,359,240	44.12
Total	3,080,727	100.00
Source: Washington Secretary of State

=== By county ===
County results
County	Yes		No		Margin		Total votes
County	#	%	#	%	#	%	Total votes
Adams	2,865	67.99%	1,349	32.01%	1,516	35.98%	4,214
Asotin	5,821	64.08%	3,263	35.92%	2,558	28.16%	9,084
Benton	49,121	65.38%	26,012	34.62%	23,109	30.76%	75,133
Chelan	19,773	59.21%	13,621	40.79%	6,152	18.42%	33,394
Clallam	23,264	59.13%	16,082	40.87%	7,182	18.25%	39,346
Clark	103,625	53.80%	88,978	46.20%	14,647	7.60%	192,603
Columbia	1,472	66.49%	742	33.51%	730	32.97%	2,214
Cowlitz	25,519	57.56%	18,814	42.44%	6,705	15.12%	44,333
Douglas	9,942	66.56%	4,995	33.44%	4,947	33.12%	14,937
Ferry	2,349	66.98%	1,158	33.02%	1,191	33.96%	3,507
Franklin	14,901	66.81%	7,401	33.19%	7,500	33.63%	22,302
Garfield	901	66.74%	449	33.26%	452	33.48%	1,350
Grant	18,821	70.88%	7,732	29.12%	11,089	41.76%	26,553
Grays Harbor	19,113	66.83%	9,485	33.17%	9,628	33.67%	28,598
Island	24,032	57.38%	17,847	42.62%	6,185	14.77%	41,879
Jefferson	9,322	44.87%	11,453	55.13%	-2,131	-10.26%	20,775
King	430,934	45.22%	521,970	54.78%	-91,036	-9.55%	952,904
Kitsap	68,363	56.80%	51,986	43.20%	16,377	13.61%	120,349
Kittitas	12,447	64.55%	6,835	35.45%	5,612	29.10%	19,282
Klickitat	5,838	54.99%	4,779	45.01%	1,059	9.97%	10,617
Lewis	21,796	64.13%	12,191	35.87%	9,605	28.26%	33,987
Lincoln	3,935	70.46%	1,650	29.54%	2,285	40.91%	5,585
Mason	17,770	64.13%	9,941	35.87%	7,829	28.25%	27,711
Okanogan	10,225	61.13%	6,501	38.87%	3,724	22.26%	16,726
Pacific	6,559	60.43%	4,295	39.57%	2,264	20.86%	10,854
Pend Oreille	4,556	65.94%	2,353	34.06%	2,203	31.89%	6,909
Pierce	209,376	64.45%	115,488	35.55%	93,888	28.90%	324,864
San Juan	4,511	41.33%	6,404	58.67%	-1,893	-17.34%	10,915
Skagit	32,686	60.00%	21,792	40.00%	10,894	20.00%	54,478
Skamania	2,846	51.11%	2,722	48.89%	124	2.23%	5,568
Snohomish	194,137	60.45%	127,038	39.55%	67,099	20.89%	321,175
Spokane	147,705	65.15%	78,998	34.85%	68,707	30.31%	226,703
Stevens	16,088	71.11%	6,536	28.89%	9,552	42.22%	22,624
Thurston	67,923	54.59%	56,504	45.41%	11,419	9.18%	124,427
Wahkiakum	1,287	53.29%	1,128	46.71%	159	6.58%	2,415
Walla Walla	15,023	58.83%	10,513	41.17%	4,510	17.66%	25,536
Whatcom	57,390	52.75%	51,401	47.25%	5,989	5.51%	108,791
Whitman	9,552	55.57%	7,637	44.43%	1,915	11.14%	17,189
Yakima	49,699	70.10%	21,197	29.90%	28,502	40.20%	70,896
Totals	1,721,487	55.88%	1,359,240	44.12%	362,247	11.76%	3,080,727
