= 2008 Washington Supreme Court election =

The Washington Supreme Court justices are elected at large by the voters of the state of Washington. The general election was held on November 4, 2008.

== Justice Position 3 ==
Washington State Supreme Court Position 3 election, 2008
Party	Candidate	Votes	%
Nonpartisan	Mary Fairhurst	2,015,433	100.00
Total votes		2,015,433	100.00

== Justice Position 4 ==
Washington State Supreme Court Position 4 election, 2008
Party	Candidate	Votes	%
Nonpartisan	Charles W. Johnson	2,017,077	100.00
Total votes		2,017,077	100.00

== Justice Position 7 ==
Washington State Supreme Court Position 7 election, 2008
Party	Candidate	Votes	%
Nonpartisan	Debra L. Stephens	1,999,584	100.00
Total votes		1,999,584	100.00
