= 2020 Washington State Auditor election =

- November 3, 2020
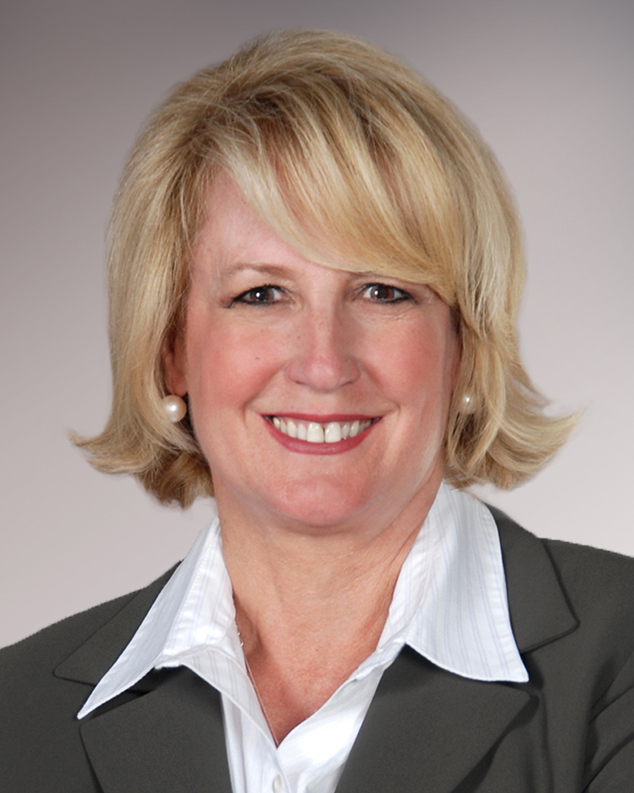

Nominee	Pat McCarthy	Chris Leyba
Party	Democratic	Republican
Popular vote	2,260,830	1,633,956
Percentage	58.00%	41.92%
- McCarthy: 50–60% 60–70% 70–80% 80–90% Leyba: 40–50% 50–60% 60–70% 70–80%
State Auditor before election
Pat McCarthy
Democratic
Elected State Auditor
Pat McCarthy
Democratic

The 2020 Washington State Auditor election was held on November 3, 2020, to elect the Washington State Auditor, concurrently with the 2020 U.S. presidential election, as well as elections to the U.S. Senate and various state and local elections, including for U.S. House and governor of Washington. Washington is one of two states that holds a top-two primary, meaning that all candidates are listed on the same ballot regardless of party affiliation, and the top two move on to the general election.

Incumbent Democratic State Auditor Pat McCarthy was re-elected to a second term in office.

The top-two primary was held on August 4.

== Primary election ==
=== Democratic Party ===
==== Advanced to general ====
- Pat McCarthy, incumbent state auditor (2017–present)

==== Eliminated in primary ====
- Joshua Casey, CPA

=== Republican Party ===
==== Advanced to general ====
- Chris Leyba, King County Sheriff's Office detective

=== Endorsements ===
Pat McCarthy (D)

Newspapers

- The Seattle Times

=== Results ===
County results McCarthy: 40–50%; 50–60%; 60–70%; Leyba: 40–50%; 50–60%; 60–70%; 70–80%

Congressional district results McCarthy: 40–50%; 60–70%; 70–80%; Leyba: 40–50%; 50–60%; 60–70%

Blanket primary results
Party	Candidate	Votes	%
Democratic	Pat McCarthy (incumbent)	1,134,077	47.41%
Republican	Chris Leyba	982,411	41.07%
Democratic	Joshua Casey	273,198	11.42%
Write-in		2,278	0.10%
Total votes		2,391,964	100.00%

==== By county ====
Combined partisan vote by county Democratic: 50–60%; 60–70%; 70–80%; Republican: 40–50%; 50–60%; 60–70%; 70–80%

Combined partisan vote by congressional district Democratic: 50–60%; 60–70%; 70–80%; 80–90%; Republican: 50–60%; 60–70%

County results
County	Pat McCarthy Democratic		Chris Leyba Republican		Joshua Casey Democratic		Write-in Various		Margin		Total votes
County	#	%	#	%	#	%	#	%	#	%	Total votes
Adams	610	18.15%	2,536	75.45%	211	6.28%	4	0.12%	-1,926	-57.30%	3,361
Asotin	1,903	28.40%	4,183	62.43%	601	8.97%	13	0.19%	-2,280	-34.03%	6,700
Benton	16,211	26.91%	38,209	63.42%	5,743	9.53%	81	0.13%	-21,998	-36.51%	60,244
Chelan	8,513	31.63%	16,189	60.16%	2,172	8.07%	37	0.14%	-7,676	-28.52%	26,911
Clallam	12,920	41.48%	15,164	48.69%	3,041	9.76%	21	0.07%	-2,244	-7.20%	31,146
Clark	62,467	42.31%	69,297	46.94%	15,699	10.63%	172	0.12%	-6,830	-4.63%	147,635
Columbia	349	21.45%	1,177	72.34%	98	6.02%	3	0.18%	-828	-50.89%	1,627
Cowlitz	11,237	31.58%	21,067	59.21%	3,228	9.07%	47	0.13%	-9,830	-27.63%	35,579
Douglas	3,247	24.77%	8,923	68.06%	918	7.00%	22	0.17%	-5,676	-43.30%	13,110
Ferry	807	26.10%	2,054	66.43%	228	7.37%	3	0.10%	-1,247	-40.33%	3,092
Franklin	4,736	26.18%	11,561	63.92%	1,772	9.80%	18	0.10%	-6,825	-37.73%	18,087
Garfield	176	18.31%	724	75.34%	59	6.14%	2	0.21%	-548	-57.02%	961
Grant	4,271	19.69%	15,756	72.64%	1,643	7.57%	22	0.10%	-11,485	-52.95%	21,692
Grays Harbor	8,263	35.20%	12,419	52.90%	2,772	11.81%	23	0.10%	-4,156	-17.70%	23,477
Island	15,489	44.63%	15,771	45.44%	3,401	9.80%	47	0.14%	-282	-0.81%	34,708
Jefferson	9,918	59.59%	4,924	29.58%	1,762	10.59%	40	0.24%	4,994	30.00%	16,644
King	458,048	63.82%	164,890	22.98%	94,187	13.12%	550	0.08%	293,158	40.85%	717,675
Kitsap	45,033	47.90%	38,567	41.02%	10,353	11.01%	71	0.08%	6,466	6.88%	94,024
Kittitas	4,932	31.90%	9,222	59.65%	1,290	8.34%	15	0.10%	-4,290	-27.75%	15,459
Klickitat	2,784	34.17%	4,741	58.19%	618	7.59%	4	0.05%	-1,957	-24.02%	8,147
Lewis	6,616	22.51%	20,500	69.75%	2,244	7.64%	30	0.10%	-13,884	-47.24%	29,390
Lincoln	758	16.13%	3,655	77.78%	284	6.04%	2	0.04%	-2,897	-61.65%	4,699
Mason	8,624	37.29%	12,245	52.95%	2,225	9.62%	32	0.14%	-3,621	-15.66%	23,126
Okanogan	4,264	32.06%	8,044	60.49%	974	7.32%	16	0.12%	-3,780	-28.43%	13,298
Pacific	3,576	39.88%	4,477	49.93%	900	10.04%	13	0.14%	-901	-10.05%	8,966
Pend Oreille	1,317	25.22%	3,498	66.97%	403	7.72%	5	0.10%	-2,181	-41.76%	5,223
Pierce	119,485	45.09%	116,827	44.09%	28,404	10.72%	258	0.10%	2,658	1.00%	264,974
San Juan	5,325	63.36%	2,066	24.58%	1,006	11.97%	7	0.08%	3,259	38.78%	8,404
Skagit	17,921	40.16%	22,033	49.37%	4,639	10.39%	36	0.08%	-4,112	-9.21%	44,629
Skamania	1,452	35.17%	2,298	55.67%	376	9.11%	2	0.05%	-846	-20.49%	4,128
Snohomish	111,646	44.54%	103,858	41.43%	34,990	13.96%	192	0.08%	7,788	3.11%	250,686
Spokane	57,234	35.48%	86,731	53.76%	17,163	10.64%	198	0.12%	-29,497	-18.28%	161,326
Stevens	3,743	20.72%	13,132	72.68%	1,157	6.40%	36	0.20%	-9,389	-51.96%	18,068
Thurston	51,119	49.66%	40,688	39.52%	11,029	10.71%	108	0.10%	10,431	10.13%	102,944
Wahkiakum	609	31.29%	1,146	58.89%	187	9.61%	4	0.21%	-537	-27.60%	1,946
Walla Walla	6,367	33.42%	10,870	57.05%	1,802	9.46%	14	0.07%	-4,503	-23.63%	19,053
Whatcom	43,729	49.19%	35,913	40.40%	9,202	10.35%	54	0.06%	7,816	8.79%	88,898
Whitman	4,144	37.85%	5,555	50.74%	1,232	11.25%	17	0.16%	-1,411	-12.89%	10,948
Yakima	14,234	27.92%	31,501	61.79%	5,185	10.17%	59	0.12%	-17,267	-33.87%	50,979
Totals	1,134,077	47.41%	982,411	41.07%	273,198	11.42%	2,278	0.10%	151,666	6.34%	2,391,964

Counties that flipped from Democratic to Republican

- Cowlitz (largest city: Longview)
- Grays Harbor (largest city: Aberdeen)
- Mason (largest city: Shelton)
- Pacific (largest city: Raymond)
- Spokane (largest city: Spokane)

==== By congressional district ====
District	McCarthy	Leyba	Casey	Representative
1st	45%	42%	13%	Suzan DelBene
2nd	49%	38%	13%	Rick Larsen
3rd	37%	53%	10%	Jaime Herrera Beutler
4th	26%	65%	9%	Dan Newhouse
5th	33%	57%	10%	Cathy McMorris Rodgers
6th	48%	41%	11%	Derek Kilmer
7th	75%	13%	12%	Pramila Jayapal
8th	40%	49%	11%	Kim Schrier
9th	61%	25%	14%	Adam Smith
10th	47%	42%	11%	Denny Heck

== General election ==
2020 Washington State Auditor election debate
No.	Date	Host	Moderator	Link	Democratic	Republican
Key: P Participant A Absent N Not invited I Invited W Withdrawn						
Key: P Participant A Absent N Not invited I Invited W Withdrawn					Pat McCarthy	Chris Leyba
1	Sep. 23, 2020	The Columbian		YouTube	P	P

=== Polling ===
Poll source	Date(s) administered	Sample size (Note: Key: A – all adults RV – registered voters LV – likely voters V – unclear)	Margin of error	Pat McCarthy (D)	Chris Leyba (R)	Undecided
Public Policy Polling (D) (Note: Poll sponsored by the Northwest Progressive Institute)	October 14–15, 2020	610 (LV)	± 4.0%	52%	34%	14%

=== Results ===
2020 Washington State Auditor election
Party	Candidate	Votes	%	±%
Democratic	Pat McCarthy (incumbent)	2,260,830	58.00%	+5.69%
Republican	Chris Leyba	1,633,956	41.92%	–5.77%
Write-in		3,316	0.09%	N/A
Total votes		3,898,102	100.00%	N/A
Democratic hold				

==== By county ====
County results
County	Pat McCarthy Democratic		Chris Leyba Republican		Write-in Various		Margin		Total votes
County	#	%	#	%	#	%	#	%	Total votes
Adams	1,828	32.41%	3,804	67.43%	9	0.16%	-1,976	-35.03%	5,641
Asotin	4,305	37.77%	7,070	62.02%	24	0.21%	-2,765	-24.26%	11,399
Benton	38,421	39.03%	59,943	60.89%	87	0.09%	-21,522	-21.86%	98,451
Chelan	18,142	43.90%	23,166	56.06%	18	0.04%	-5,024	-12.16%	41,326
Clallam	24,344	51.41%	22,977	48.52%	34	0.07%	1,367	2.89%	47,355
Clark	134,462	51.72%	125,238	48.17%	269	0.10%	9,224	3.55%	259,969
Columbia	682	28.76%	1,687	71.15%	2	0.08%	-1,005	-42.39%	2,371
Cowlitz	23,938	41.58%	33,598	58.36%	34	0.06%	-9,660	-16.78%	57,570
Douglas	7,385	36.18%	13,007	63.72%	21	0.10%	-5,622	-27.54%	20,413
Ferry	1,488	35.57%	2,689	64.28%	6	0.14%	-1,201	-28.71%	4,183
Franklin	13,273	42.22%	18,143	57.71%	22	0.07%	-4,870	-15.49%	31,438
Garfield	395	28.38%	993	71.34%	4	0.29%	-598	-42.96%	1,392
Grant	11,770	32.59%	24,297	67.27%	50	0.14%	-12,527	-34.68%	36,117
Grays Harbor	17,541	47.40%	19,419	52.47%	47	0.13%	-1,878	-5.07%	37,007
Island	27,725	53.87%	23,710	46.06%	36	0.07%	4,015	7.80%	51,471
Jefferson	16,675	69.52%	7,300	30.44%	10	0.04%	9,375	39.09%	23,985
King	847,813	73.75%	301,024	26.19%	721	0.06%	546,789	47.57%	1,149,558
Kitsap	86,608	57.08%	64,956	42.81%	154	0.10%	21,652	14.27%	151,718
Kittitas	10,773	42.93%	14,309	57.02%	12	0.05%	-3,536	-14.09%	25,094
Klickitat	5,779	44.51%	7,190	55.38%	14	0.11%	-1,411	-10.87%	12,983
Lewis	14,292	32.86%	29,164	67.04%	44	0.10%	-14,872	-34.19%	43,500
Lincoln	1,685	24.76%	5,114	75.16%	5	0.07%	-3,429	-50.40%	6,804
Mason	16,955	47.47%	18,695	52.35%	64	0.18%	-1,740	-4.87%	35,714
Okanogan	8,771	42.99%	11,606	56.88%	27	0.13%	-2,835	-13.89%	20,404
Pacific	6,718	49.83%	6,735	49.96%	28	0.21%	-17	-0.13%	13,481
Pend Oreille	2,681	32.74%	5,502	67.18%	7	0.09%	-2,821	-34.44%	8,190
Pierce	243,910	54.87%	200,150	45.03%	428	0.10%	43,760	9.85%	444,488
San Juan	9,235	73.45%	3,333	26.51%	6	0.05%	5,902	46.94%	12,574
Skagit	35,996	52.10%	33,004	47.77%	86	0.12%	2,992	4.33%	69,086
Skamania	3,177	45.33%	3,823	54.54%	9	0.13%	-646	-9.22%	7,009
Snohomish	241,228	57.54%	177,711	42.39%	330	0.08%	63,517	15.15%	419,269
Spokane	132,756	47.21%	148,081	52.66%	359	0.13%	-15,325	-5.45%	281,196
Stevens	8,021	29.37%	19,252	70.49%	38	0.14%	-11,231	-41.12%	27,311
Thurston	93,931	58.36%	66,884	41.55%	140	0.09%	27,047	16.80%	160,955
Wahkiakum	1,158	40.99%	1,664	58.90%	3	0.11%	-506	-17.91%	2,825
Walla Walla	13,515	45.07%	16,453	54.87%	19	0.06%	-2,938	-9.80%	29,987
Whatcom	80,874	60.51%	52,729	39.45%	61	0.05%	28,145	21.06%	133,664
Whitman	10,706	53.22%	9,390	46.68%	21	0.10%	1,316	6.54%	20,117
Yakima	41,874	45.47%	50,146	54.46%	67	0.07%	-8,272	-8.98%	92,087
Totals	2,260,830	58.00%	1,633,956	41.92%	3,316	0.09%	626,874	16.08%	3,898,102

Counties that flipped from Republican to Democratic

- Clallam (largest city: Port Angeles)
- Clark (largest city: Vancouver)
- Island (largest city: Oak Harbor)
- Skagit (largest city: Mount Vernon)
- Whitman (largest city: Pullman)

==== By congressional district ====
McCarthy won seven of ten congressional districts.

District	McCarthy	Leyba	Representative
1st	57%	43%	Suzan DelBene
2nd	61%	39%	Rick Larsen
3rd	48%	52%	Jaime Herrera Beutler
4th	40%	59%	Dan Newhouse
5th	45%	55%	Cathy McMorris Rodgers
6th	58%	42%	Derek Kilmer
7th	84%	16%	Pramila Jayapal
8th	51%	49%	Kim Schrier
9th	72%	27%	Adam Smith
10th	57%	43%	Denny Heck (116th Congress)
10th	57%	43%	Marilyn Strickland (117th Congress)

== Notes ==
Partisan clients
