= Connie Ladenburg =

American politician

Member of the Pierce County Council from the 4th District
- In office January 1, 2013 – January 13, 2021
- Preceded by: Timothy M. Farrell
- Succeeded by: Ryan Mello

Member of the Washington House of Representatives from the 29th district
- In office January 10, 2011 – January 14, 2013
- Preceded by: Steve Conway
- Succeeded by: David Sawyer

Personal details
- Party: Democratic
- Spouse: John Ladenburg
- Education: Pacific Lutheran University

Connie J. Ladenburg is an American politician of the Democratic Party. She served as a member of the Tacoma City Council, the Washington State House of Representatives and is now a member of the Pierce County Council.

== Career ==
Ladenburg was a member of the Washington House of Representatives, representing the 29th district. She was elected to the Pierce County Council District 4, in November 2012.

== Personal life ==
Ladenburg's husband, John Ladenburg has served as Pierce County Executive and Pierce County Prosecuting Attorney.
