= Washington's 7th congressional district =

U.S. House district for Washington

Coordinates: 47°30′N 122°24′W

- Interactive map of district boundaries since January 3, 2023, with Seattle highlighted in red.
- Representative: Pramila Jayapal; D–Seattle
- Population (2025): 814,115
- Median household income: $125,094
- Ethnicity: 62.5% White; 14.4% Asian; 9.5% Hispanic; 7.2% Two or more races; 4.9% Black; 1.5% other
- Cook PVI: D+39

Washington's 7th congressional district encompasses most of Seattle and Burien, and all of Vashon Island, Lake Forest Park, Shoreline, and Normandy Park. Since 2017, the 7th district has been represented in the U.S. House of Representatives by Democrat Pramila Jayapal. With a Cook Partisan Voting Index rating of D+39, it is the most Democratic district in Washington, and is in a three-way tie, with California's 12th congressional district and Maryland's 4th congressional district, for 2nd most Democratic district in the entire United States.

The 7th is the most Democratic district in the Pacific Northwest, and the most Democratic district on the West Coast outside the San Francisco Bay Area. It is also the most Democratic majority-white district in the United States. Democrats dominate every level of government, and routinely win elections with well over 80% of the vote in this district. Barack Obama swept the district in 2008 and 2012, with 82% and 83% of the vote, respectively. Hillary Clinton won the district with 83% in 2016, Joe Biden received 86% in the district in 2020, and Kamala Harris received 85% in 2024.

Washington's seventh seat in the U.S. House was added after the 1950 census, but the state did not immediately reapportion. It was contested as a statewide at-large seat in three elections, 1952, 1954, and 1956, and voters cast ballots for two congressional seats, their district and the at-large. Democrat Donald H. Magnuson won all three at-large elections. The 1958 election was the first after the state reapportioned to seven districts; Magnuson was elected to the new district in 1958 and 1960, but lost in 1962.

== Recent election results from statewide races ==
Year	Office	Results
2008	President	Obama 82% - 17%
2010	Senate	Murray 79% - 21%
2012	President	Obama 83% - 17%
2016	President	Clinton 83% - 11%
2016	Senate	Murray 84% - 16%
2016	Governor	Inslee 80% - 20%
2016	Lt. Governor	Habib 82% - 18%
2016	Secretary of State	Podlodowski 71% - 29%
2016	Auditor	McCarthy 76% - 24%
2018	Senate	Cantwell 86% - 14%
2020	President	Biden 86% - 11%
2020	Governor	Inslee 86% - 14%
2020	Secretary of State	Tarleton 69% - 31%
2020	Treasurer	Pellicciotti 78% - 22%
2020	Auditor	McCarthy 85% - 15%
2020	Attorney General	Ferguson 84% - 16%
2022	Senate	Murray 87% - 13%
2022	Secretary of State (Spec.)	Hobbs 75% - 24%
2024	President	Harris 85% - 11%
2024	Senate	Cantwell 86% - 13%
2024	Governor	Ferguson 84% - 16%
2024	Lt. Governor	Heck 85% - 15%
2024	Secretary of State	Hobbs 88% - 12%
2024	Treasurer	Pellicciotti 85% - 14%
2024	Auditor	McCarthy 86% - 13%
2024	Attorney General	Brown 84% - 16%
2024	Commissioner of Public Lands	Upthegrove 79% - 21%

== Composition ==
For the 118th and successive Congresses (based on redistricting following the 2020 census), the district contains all or portions of the following counties and communities:

King County (8)

Boulevard Park, Burien, Lake Forest Park, Normandy Park, Seattle (part; also 9th), Shoreline, Vashon, White Center

== List of members representing the district ==
Member	Party	Dates	Cong ress	Electoral history	District location
District established January 3, 1959
Donald H. Magnuson (Seattle)	Democratic	January 3, 1959 – January 3, 1963	86th 87th	Redistricted from the at-large district and re-elected in 1958. Re-elected in 1960. Lost re-election.	1959–1961 [data missing]
Donald H. Magnuson (Seattle)	Democratic	January 3, 1959 – January 3, 1963	86th 87th	Redistricted from the at-large district and re-elected in 1958. Re-elected in 1960. Lost re-election.	1961–1969 [data missing]
K. William Stinson (Bellevue)	Republican	January 3, 1963 – January 3, 1965	88th	Elected in 1962. Lost re-election.	1961–1969 [data missing]
Brock Adams (Seattle)	Democratic	January 3, 1965 – January 22, 1977	89th 90th 91st 92nd 93rd 94th 95th	Elected in 1964. Elected in 1966. Elected in 1968. Elected in 1970. Elected in 1972. Elected in 1974. Elected in 1976. Resigned to become U.S. Secretary of Transportation.	1961–1969 [data missing]
Brock Adams (Seattle)	Democratic	January 3, 1965 – January 22, 1977	89th 90th 91st 92nd 93rd 94th 95th	Elected in 1964. Elected in 1966. Elected in 1968. Elected in 1970. Elected in 1972. Elected in 1974. Elected in 1976. Resigned to become U.S. Secretary of Transportation.	1969–1973; Parts of King
Brock Adams (Seattle)	Democratic	January 3, 1965 – January 22, 1977	89th 90th 91st 92nd 93rd 94th 95th	Elected in 1964. Elected in 1966. Elected in 1968. Elected in 1970. Elected in 1972. Elected in 1974. Elected in 1976. Resigned to become U.S. Secretary of Transportation.	1973–1983 [data missing]
Vacant		January 22, 1977 – May 17, 1977	95th		1973–1983 [data missing]
John E. Cunningham (Seattle)	Republican	May 17, 1977 – January 3, 1979	95th	Elected to finish Adams's term. Lost re-election.	1973–1983 [data missing]
Mike Lowry (Renton)	Democratic	January 3, 1979 – January 3, 1989	96th 97th 98th 99th 100th	Elected in 1978. Re-elected in 1980. Re-elected in 1982. Re-elected in 1984. Re-elected in 1986. Retired to run for U.S. Senator.	1973–1983 [data missing]
Mike Lowry (Renton)	Democratic	January 3, 1979 – January 3, 1989	96th 97th 98th 99th 100th	Elected in 1978. Re-elected in 1980. Re-elected in 1982. Re-elected in 1984. Re-elected in 1986. Retired to run for U.S. Senator.	1983–1985 [data missing]
Mike Lowry (Renton)	Democratic	January 3, 1979 – January 3, 1989	96th 97th 98th 99th 100th	Elected in 1978. Re-elected in 1980. Re-elected in 1982. Re-elected in 1984. Re-elected in 1986. Retired to run for U.S. Senator.	1985–1993 [data missing]
Jim McDermott (Seattle)	Democratic	January 3, 1989 – January 3, 2017	101st 102nd 103rd 104th 105th 106th 107th 108th 109th 110th 111th 112th 113th 114th	Elected in 1988. Re-elected in 1990. Re-elected in 1992. Re-elected in 1994. Re-elected in 1996. Re-elected in 1998. Re-elected in 2000. Re-elected in 2002. Re-elected in 2004. Re-elected in 2006. Re-elected in 2008. Re-elected in 2010. Re-elected in 2012. Re-elected in 2014. Retired.	1985–1993 [data missing]
Jim McDermott (Seattle)	Democratic	January 3, 1989 – January 3, 2017	101st 102nd 103rd 104th 105th 106th 107th 108th 109th 110th 111th 112th 113th 114th	Elected in 1988. Re-elected in 1990. Re-elected in 1992. Re-elected in 1994. Re-elected in 1996. Re-elected in 1998. Re-elected in 2000. Re-elected in 2002. Re-elected in 2004. Re-elected in 2006. Re-elected in 2008. Re-elected in 2010. Re-elected in 2012. Re-elected in 2014. Retired.	1993–2003; Parts of King
Jim McDermott (Seattle)	Democratic	January 3, 1989 – January 3, 2017	101st 102nd 103rd 104th 105th 106th 107th 108th 109th 110th 111th 112th 113th 114th	Elected in 1988. Re-elected in 1990. Re-elected in 1992. Re-elected in 1994. Re-elected in 1996. Re-elected in 1998. Re-elected in 2000. Re-elected in 2002. Re-elected in 2004. Re-elected in 2006. Re-elected in 2008. Re-elected in 2010. Re-elected in 2012. Re-elected in 2014. Retired.	2003–2013 Parts of King
Jim McDermott (Seattle)	Democratic	January 3, 1989 – January 3, 2017	101st 102nd 103rd 104th 105th 106th 107th 108th 109th 110th 111th 112th 113th 114th	Elected in 1988. Re-elected in 1990. Re-elected in 1992. Re-elected in 1994. Re-elected in 1996. Re-elected in 1998. Re-elected in 2000. Re-elected in 2002. Re-elected in 2004. Re-elected in 2006. Re-elected in 2008. Re-elected in 2010. Re-elected in 2012. Re-elected in 2014. Retired.	2013–2023 Parts of King and Snohomish
Pramila Jayapal (Seattle)	Democratic	January 3, 2017 – present	115th 116th 117th 118th 119th	Elected in 2016. Re-elected in 2018. Re-elected in 2020. Re-elected in 2022. Re-elected in 2024. Re-elected in 2026.	2013–2023 Parts of King and Snohomish
Pramila Jayapal (Seattle)	Democratic	January 3, 2017 – present	115th 116th 117th 118th 119th	Elected in 2016. Re-elected in 2018. Re-elected in 2020. Re-elected in 2022. Re-elected in 2024. Re-elected in 2026.	2023–present Parts of King

== Recent election results ==
=== 2012 ===
Washington's 7th Congressional District, 2012
Party	Candidate	Votes	%
Democratic	Jim McDermott (Incumbent)	298,368	79.6
Republican	Ron Bemis	76,212	20.4
Total votes		374,580	100.0

=== 2014 ===
Washington's 7th congressional district, 2014
Party	Candidate	Votes	%
Democratic	Jim McDermott (incumbent)	203,954	81.0
Republican	Craig Keller	47,921	19.0
Total votes		251,875	100.0
Democratic hold			

=== 2016 ===
Washington's 7th congressional district, 2016
Party	Candidate	Votes	%
Democratic	Pramila Jayapal	212,010	56.0
Democratic	Brady Walkinshaw	166,744	44.0
Total votes		378,754	100.0
Democratic hold			

=== 2018 ===
Washington's 7th congressional district, 2018
Party	Candidate	Votes	%
Democratic	Pramila Jayapal (incumbent)	329,800	83.6
Republican	Craig Keller	64,881	16.4
Total votes		394,681	100.0
Democratic hold			

=== 2020 ===
Washington's 7th congressional district, 2020
Party	Candidate	Votes	%
Democratic	Pramila Jayapal (incumbent)	387,109	83.0
Republican	Craig Keller	78,240	16.8
Write-in		1,113	0.2
Total votes		466,462	100.0
Democratic hold			

=== 2022 ===
Washington's 7th congressional district, 2022
Party	Candidate	Votes	%
Democratic	Pramila Jayapal (incumbent)	295,998	85.4
Republican	Cliff Moon	49,207	14.2
Write-in		1,442	0.4
Total votes		346,647	100.0
Democratic hold			

=== 2024 ===
Washington's 7th congressional district, 2024
Party	Candidate	Votes	%
Democratic	Pramila Jayapal (incumbent)	352,286	83.9
Republican	Dan Alexander	66,220	15.8
Write-in		1,313	0.3
Total votes		419,819	100.0
Democratic hold			

== Historical district boundaries ==
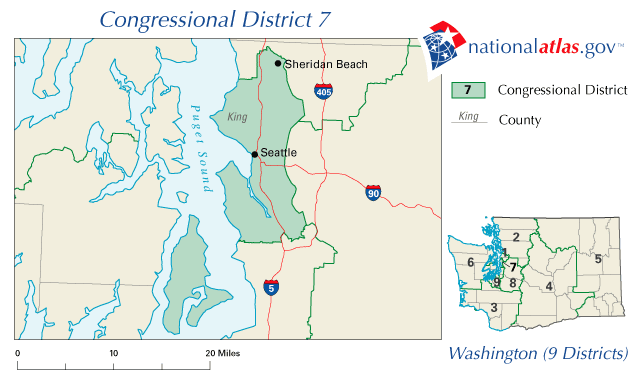
The district from 2003 to 2013

The district from 2013 to 2023

== See also ==
- United States House of Representatives elections in Washington, 2008
- United States House of Representatives elections in Washington, 2010
- United States House of Representatives elections in Washington, 2012
