= Washington's 2nd congressional district =

U.S. House district for Washington

Coordinates: 48°24′N 122°12′W

- Interactive map of district boundaries since January 3, 2023
- Representative: Rick Larsen; D–Everett
- Population (2025): 790,975
- Median household income: $95,044
- Ethnicity: 69.0% White; 12.4% Hispanic; 7.0% Asian; 6.3% Two or more races; 2.6% Black; 1.6% Native American; 1.1% other
- Cook PVI: D+12

Washington's 2nd congressional district includes all of Island, San Juan, Skagit, and Whatcom counties, as well as coastal western Snohomish County. It stretches from Bellingham and the Canada–United States border in the north down to the Skagit/Snohomish county line, with a narrow strip along the coast running down to Lynnwood and the King/Snohomish county line in the south. Since 2001, it has been represented by Democrat Rick Larsen.

Originally created in 1909, when Washington was broken up into districts, the second district was represented by future U.S. Senator Henry M. "Scoop" Jackson between 1941 and 1953. It was a reliably Democratic district for most of the latter half of the 20th century, until the Republican Revolution of 1994, when retiring Rep. Al Swift was replaced by Jack Metcalf. Larsen has represented the district since Metcalf's retirement in 2001. He faced a close re-election in 2002, but was handily re-elected in 2004, and didn't face serious opposition until 2010. In the 2008 election, Larsen easily defeated Republican challenger Rick Bart. In the 2010 election, Larsen narrowly avoided defeat against Republican challenger John Koster.

The district has leaned Democratic in presidential elections since the 1988 election. Under current boundaries, Barack Obama swept the district in 2008 and 2012, with 58% of the vote each time. Hillary Clinton won the district with 55% in 2016, Joe Biden received 60% in the district in 2020, and Kamala Harris also received 60% here in 2024.

== Recent election results from statewide races ==
Year	Office	Results
2008	President	Obama 58% - 40%
2010	Senate	Murray 53% - 47%
2012	President	Obama 58% - 42%
2016	President	Clinton 55% - 37%
2016	Senate	Murray 59% - 41%
2016	Governor	Inslee 55% - 45%
2016	Lt. Governor	Habib 56% - 44%
2016	Secretary of State	Wyman 53% - 47%
2016	Auditor	McCarthy 53% - 47%
2018	Senate	Cantwell 59% - 41%
2020	President	Biden 60% - 37%
2020	Governor	Inslee 58% - 41%
2020	Secretary of State	Wyman 51% - 49%
2020	Treasurer	Pellicciotti 56% - 44%
2020	Auditor	McCarthy 59% - 41%
2020	Attorney General	Ferguson 58% - 42%
2022	Senate	Murray 59% - 41%
2022	Secretary of State (Spec.)	Hobbs 51% - 43%
2024	President	Harris 60% - 36%
2024	Senate	Cantwell 61% - 39%
2024	Governor	Ferguson 58% - 42%
2024	Lt. Governor	Heck 58% - 42%
2024	Secretary of State	Hobbs 62% - 38%
2024	Treasurer	Pellicciotti 60% - 40%
2024	Auditor	McCarthy 60% - 39%
2024	Attorney General	Brown 58% - 42%
2024	Commissioner of Public Lands	Upthegrove 56% - 44%

== Composition ==
For the 118th and successive Congresses (based on redistricting following the 2020 census), the district contains all or portions of the following counties and communities:

Island County (7)

All 7 communities

San Juan County (2)

Friday Harbor, Roche Harbor

Skagit County (19)

All 19 communities

Snohomish County (18)

Edmonds, Esperance, Everett (part; also 8th), Kayak Point, Lake Goodwin, Lake Ketchum, Lake Stickney, Lynwood, Meadowdale, Mukilteo, North Lynwood (part; also 1st), Northwest Stanwood, Picnic Point, Silvana, Stanwood, Sunday Lake, Warm Beach, Woodway

Whatcom County (19)

All 19 communities

== List of members representing the district ==
Member (District home)	Party	Years	Cong ress	Electoral history	District location
District established March 4, 1909
Francis W. Cushman (Tacoma)	Republican	March 4, 1909 – July 6, 1909	61st	Redistricted from the at-large district and re-elected in 1908. Died.	
Vacant		July 6, 1909 – November 2, 1909	61st		
William W. McCredie (Vancouver)	Republican	November 2, 1909 – March 3, 1911	61st	Elected to finish Cushman's term. Lost renomination.	
Stanton Warburton (Tacoma)	Republican	March 4, 1911 – March 3, 1913	62nd	Elected in 1910. Lost renomination.	
Albert Johnson (Hoquiam)	Republican	March 4, 1913 – March 3, 1915	63rd	Elected in 1912. Redistricted to the 3rd district.	
Lindley H. Hadley (Bellingham)	Republican	March 4, 1915 – March 3, 1933	64th 65th 66th 67th 68th 69th 70th 71st 72nd	Elected in 1914. Re-elected in 1916. Re-elected in 1918. Re-elected in 1920. Re-elected in 1922. Re-elected in 1924. Re-elected in 1926. Re-elected in 1928. Re-elected in 1930. Lost re-election.	
Monrad Wallgren (Everett)	Democratic	March 4, 1933 – December 19, 1940	73rd 74th 75th 76th	Elected in 1932. Re-elected in 1934. Re-elected in 1936. Re-elected in 1938. Retired to run for U.S. senator and resigned when elected.	
Vacant		December 19, 1940 – January 3, 1941	76th		
Henry M. Jackson (Everett)	Democratic	January 3, 1941 – January 3, 1953	77th 78th 79th 80th 81st 82nd	Elected in 1940. Re-elected in 1942. Re-elected in 1944. Re-elected in 1946. Re-elected in 1948. Re-elected in 1950. Retired to run for U.S. senator.	
Jack Westland (Everett)	Republican	January 3, 1953 – January 3, 1965	83rd 84th 85th 86th 87th 88th	Elected in 1952. Re-elected in 1954. Re-elected in 1956. Re-elected in 1958. Re-elected in 1960. Re-elected in 1962. Lost re-election.	
Lloyd Meeds (Lake Stevens)	Democratic	January 3, 1965 – January 3, 1979	89th 90th 91st 92nd 93rd 94th 95th	Elected in 1964. Re-elected in 1966. Re-elected in 1968. Re-elected in 1970. Re-elected in 1972. Re-elected in 1974. Re-elected in 1976. Retired.	
Al Swift (Bellingham)	Democratic	January 3, 1979 – January 3, 1995	96th 97th 98th 99th 100th 101st 102nd 103rd	Elected in 1978. Re-elected in 1980. Re-elected in 1982. Re-elected in 1984. Re-elected in 1986. Re-elected in 1988. Re-elected in 1990. Re-elected in 1992. Retired.	
Jack Metcalf (Langley)	Republican	January 3, 1995 – January 3, 2001	104th 105th 106th	Elected in 1994. Re-elected in 1996. Re-elected in 1998. Retired.	
Rick Larsen (Everett)	Democratic	January 3, 2001 – present	107th 108th 109th 110th 111th 112th 113th 114th 115th 116th 117th 118th 119th	Elected in 2000. Re-elected in 2002. Re-elected in 2004. Re-elected in 2006. Re-elected in 2008. Re-elected in 2010. Re-elected in 2012. Re-elected in 2014. Re-elected in 2016. Re-elected in 2018. Re-elected in 2020. Re-elected in 2022. Re-elected in 2024. Re-elected in 2026.	
Rick Larsen (Everett)	Democratic	January 3, 2001 – present	107th 108th 109th 110th 111th 112th 113th 114th 115th 116th 117th 118th 119th	Elected in 2000. Re-elected in 2002. Re-elected in 2004. Re-elected in 2006. Re-elected in 2008. Re-elected in 2010. Re-elected in 2012. Re-elected in 2014. Re-elected in 2016. Re-elected in 2018. Re-elected in 2020. Re-elected in 2022. Re-elected in 2024. Re-elected in 2026.	2003–2013
Rick Larsen (Everett)	Democratic	January 3, 2001 – present	107th 108th 109th 110th 111th 112th 113th 114th 115th 116th 117th 118th 119th	Elected in 2000. Re-elected in 2002. Re-elected in 2004. Re-elected in 2006. Re-elected in 2008. Re-elected in 2010. Re-elected in 2012. Re-elected in 2014. Re-elected in 2016. Re-elected in 2018. Re-elected in 2020. Re-elected in 2022. Re-elected in 2024. Re-elected in 2026.	2013–2023
Rick Larsen (Everett)	Democratic	January 3, 2001 – present	107th 108th 109th 110th 111th 112th 113th 114th 115th 116th 117th 118th 119th	Elected in 2000. Re-elected in 2002. Re-elected in 2004. Re-elected in 2006. Re-elected in 2008. Re-elected in 2010. Re-elected in 2012. Re-elected in 2014. Re-elected in 2016. Re-elected in 2018. Re-elected in 2020. Re-elected in 2022. Re-elected in 2024. Re-elected in 2026.	2023–present

== Recent election results ==
=== 2010 ===
2010 United States House of Representatives elections
Party	Candidate	Votes	%
Democratic	Rick Larsen (Incumbent)	155,241	51.1
Republican	John Koster	148,722	48.9
Total votes		303,963	100.0
Turnout			
Democratic hold			

=== 2012 ===
2012 United States House of Representatives elections
Party	Candidate	Votes	%
Democratic	Rick Larsen (Incumbent)	184,826	61.1
Republican	Dan Matthews	117,465	38.9
Total votes		302,291	100.0
Democratic hold			

=== 2014 ===
2014 United States House of Representatives elections
Party	Candidate	Votes	%
Democratic	Rick Larsen (Incumbent)	122,173	60.6
Republican	B.J. Guillot	79,518	39.4
Total votes		201,691	100.0
Democratic hold			

=== 2016 ===
2016 United States House of Representatives elections
Party	Candidate	Votes	%
Democratic	Rick Larsen (Incumbent)	208,314	64.0
Republican	Marc Hennemann	117,094	36.0
Total votes		325,408	100.0
Democratic hold			

=== 2018 ===
2018 United States House of Representatives elections
Party	Candidate	Votes	%
Democratic	Rick Larsen (Incumbent)	210,187	71.3
Libertarian	Brian Luke	84,646	28.7
Total votes		294,833	100.0
Democratic hold			

=== 2020 ===
2020 United States House of Representatives elections
Party	Candidate	Votes	%
Democratic	Rick Larsen (incumbent)	255,252	63.1
Republican	Timothy Hazelo	148,384	36.7
Write-in		962	0.2
Total votes		404,598	100.0
Democratic hold			

=== 2022 ===
2022 United States House of Representatives elections
Party	Candidate	Votes	%
Democratic	Rick Larsen (incumbent)	202,980	60.1
Republican	Dan Matthews	134,335	39.7
Write-in		608	0.2
Total votes		337,923	100.0
Democratic hold			

=== 2024 ===
2024 United States House of Representatives elections
Party	Candidate	Votes	%
Democratic	Rick Larsen (incumbent)	263,750	63.8
Republican	Cody Hart	148,167	35.9
Write-in		1,303	0.3
Total votes		413,220	100.0
Democratic hold			

== Historical district boundaries ==
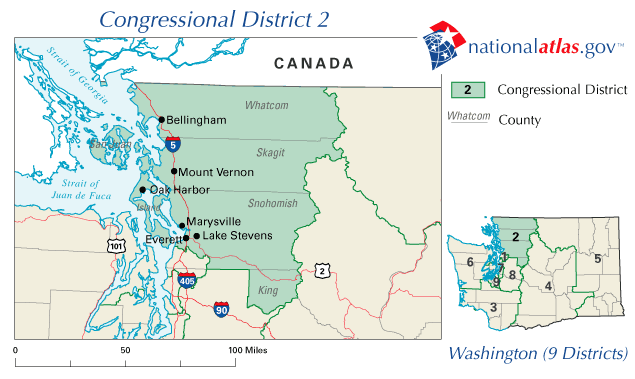
The district from 2003 to 2013

The district from 2013 to 2023

== See also ==
- 2008 United States House of Representatives elections in Washington
- 2010 United States House of Representatives elections in Washington
- 2012 United States House of Representatives elections in Washington
- 2014 United States House of Representatives elections in Washington
- 2016 United States House of Representatives elections in Washington
