= Pat McCarthy (politician) =

11th auditor of Washington

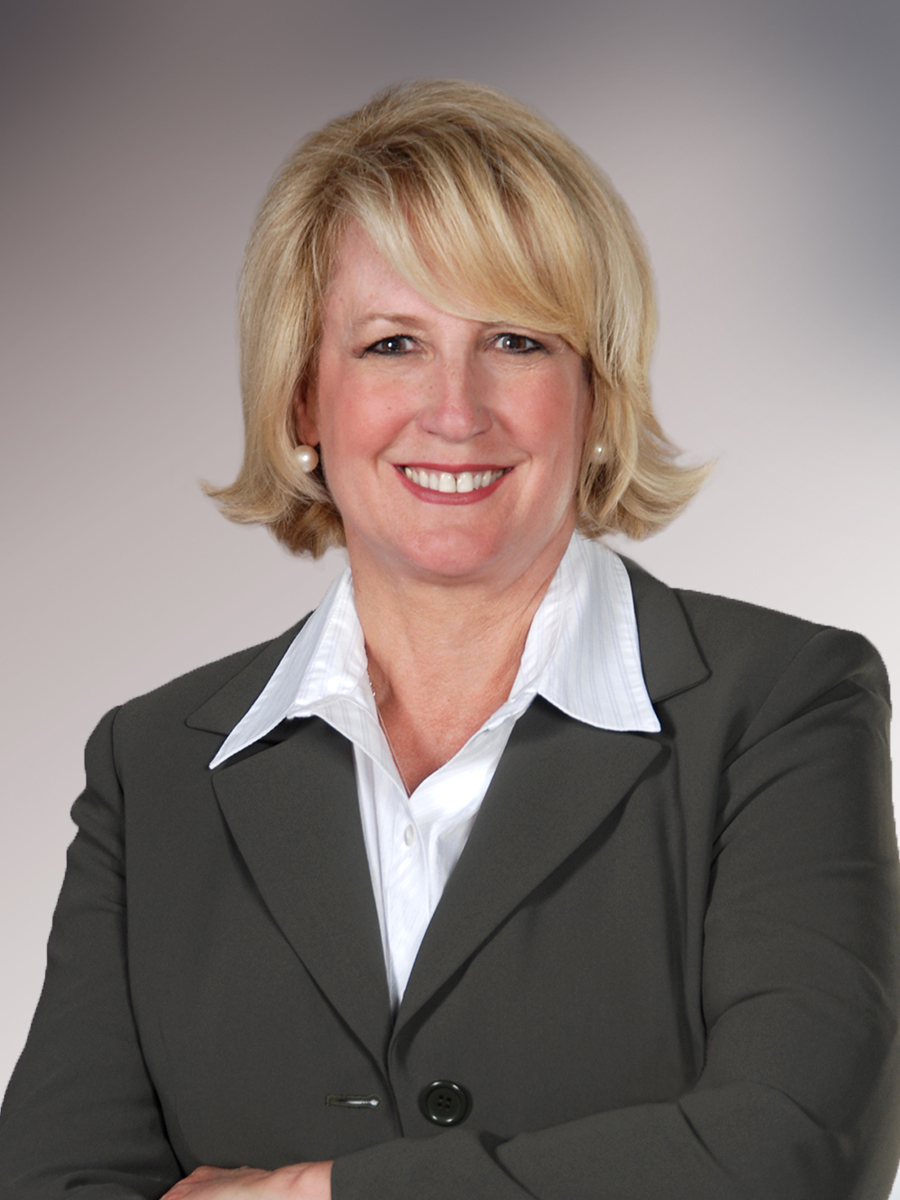

11th Auditor of Washington
- Incumbent
- Assumed office January 11, 2017
- Governor: Jay Inslee; Bob Ferguson
- Preceded by: Troy Kelley

5th Pierce County Executive
- In office January 1, 2009 – January 3, 2017
- Preceded by: John Ladenburg
- Succeeded by: Bruce Dammeier

Personal details
- Born: 1952 or 1953 (age 72–73)
- Party: Democratic
- Spouse: John McCarthy
- Children: 4
- Education: University of Washington Tacoma (BA)

Patrice A. McCarthy (born 1953) is an American politician serving as the 11th Washington State Auditor since 2017. She is a member of the Democratic Party.

== Early life and education ==
McCarthy earned her Bachelor of Arts in liberal studies from the University of Washington Tacoma in 1992.

== Career ==
McCarthy served as the school board director for the Tacoma School District from 1987 to 1999 and as the county executive of Pierce County, Washington from 2009 to 2017.

In 2016, McCarthy was elected Washington State Auditor, defeating Republican state Senator Mark Miloscia with 52% of the vote. She won reelection in 2020, receiving 58% of the vote against Republican Chris Leyba. On August 1, 2023, McCarthy announced she would be running for a third term in 2024. She was reelected again with 58% of the vote against Republican Matt Hawkins.

== Personal life ==
Her husband, John, has served on the Port of Tacoma commission and as a judge of the Pierce County Superior Court. Their son, Conor, served on the Tacoma City Council, before resigning to become a lobbyist for Comcast.

Political offices
Preceded by John Ladenburg	Pierce County Executive; 2009–2017	Succeeded by Bruce Dammeier
Preceded by Troy Kelley	Auditor of Washington; 2017–present	Incumbent
