= John Ladenburg =

American politician

John W. Ladenburg Sr.

4th Pierce County Executive
- In office January 1, 2001 – January 1, 2009
- Preceded by: Doug Sutherland
- Succeeded by: Pat McCarthy

Personal details
- Born: John William Ladenburg; September 19, 1949 (age 77) Leavenworth, Washington, U.S.
- Party: Democratic
- Spouse: Connie Ladenburg
- Education: Gonzaga University (BA); Gonzaga University School of Law (JD)
- Profession: Attorney

John William Ladenburg Sr. (born September 19, 1949) is an American attorney and politician. Ladenburg was appointed to the Tacoma City Council in 1982 and elected to a full term in 1984. He was elected Pierce County Prosecuting Attorney in 1986, defeating incumbent Bill Griffies. Ladenburg served as Pierce County prosecutor for three and one half terms and was elected county executive in 2000. He was re-elected county executive in 2004 and left office in 2009 after reaching the term limit for the office. One of Ladenburg's principal accomplishments in office was spearheading the development of Chambers Bay Golf Course in University Place, a municipal facility that hosted the 2010 United States Amateur and 2015 U.S. Open golf championships. The US Open at Chambers Bay had an economic impact of $134 million for the regional economy. Ladenburg insisted on a course that could host a U.S. Open golf championship, although most believed it could not happen.

Ladenburg was born in Leavenworth, Washington. In 1967 he graduated from Stadium High School in Tacoma, Washington. He received a B.A. degree in political science (honors) in 1971 and a J.D. degree in 1974, both from Gonzaga University. After graduation, he began a career as a trial attorney. Ladenburg was involved in several high-profile criminal cases including the Federal Salmon Scam trials and the Pierce County Racketeering trials. As Prosecuting Attorney, Ladenburg tried a number of criminal cases himself, something unusual for large prosecutors offices. He never lost a case.

Ladenburg was served on the Sound Transit Board during his Executive tenure, being elected to serve as chair from in 2003, and serving as Chair until 2007. In 2016 Governor Inslee appointed Ladenburg to the Washington State Ethics Board, where he served three years, the last year serving as Chair.

He unsuccessfully ran for Attorney General of Washington in 1992 and 2008; Ladenburg also ran for a Washington Supreme Court seat in 2012. In 2009, he returned to private practice to operate Ladenburg Law Injury Attorneys in Tacoma with his two sons, John Ladenburg, Jr. and Erik Ladenburg. Ladenburg served as the interim administrator of the Pierce County Juvenile Court in late 2013. In 2015, he served at interim administrator of the Pierce County Superior Court. His wife, Connie Ladenburg, served two terms on the Tacoma City Council from 2002 to 2010 and one term in the Washington House of Representatives from 2010 to 2012. She was elected to the Pierce County Council in 2012 and served two terms. His brother, Barry, was appointed to the Sea-Tac City Council in 2008 and left office in 2010, then was elected to the Council again in 2012. His brother, David Ladenburg, is a retired municipal court judge in Tacoma.

== See also ==
- Gabasync § Pilot programs
