= Pierce County Executive =

Elected chief executive of Pierce County, Washington, U.S.

- Incumbent; Ryan Mello since January 1, 2025
- Appointer: Electorate; Pierce County Council (unexpired terms)
- Term length: 4 years
- Inaugural holder: Booth Gardner
- Formation: May 1, 1981
- Website: Pierce County Executive

The Pierce County Executive is the head of the executive branch of Pierce County, Washington. The position is subject to four-year terms (with a term limit of 2) and is a partisan office.

== History ==
County voters approved the adoption of a home-rule charter for Pierce County on November 4, 1980, creating the position of a county executive and a seven-member county council. Prior to the adoption, the county government was led by three commissioners elected at-large. The new position took effect on May 1, 1981, with Booth Gardner elected as the first executive.

== List of executives ==
Order	Executive	Party	Took office	Left office	Terms
1	Booth Gardner	Democratic	May 1, 1981	January 1, 1985	1
2	Joe Stortini	Democratic	January 1, 1985	January 1, 1993	2
3	Doug Sutherland	Republican	January 1, 1993	January 1, 2001	2
4	John Ladenburg	Democratic	January 1, 2001	January 1, 2009	2
5	Pat McCarthy	Democratic	January 1, 2009	January 3, 2017	2
6	Bruce Dammeier	Republican	January 3, 2017	January 1, 2025	2 (Note: Executive Dammeier's second term expires on January 1, 2025.)
7	Ryan Mello	Democratic	January 1, 2025	Incumbent	1

== See also ==
- King County Executive
- Snohomish County Executive
- Whatcom County Executive
