= British Columbia carbon tax =

Repealed British Columbia policy which adds carbon taxes to fossil fuels

Carbon Tax Act

Legislative Assembly of British Columbia
- Citation: SBC 2008, c 40
- Assented to: 2008-05-29
- Status: Repealed

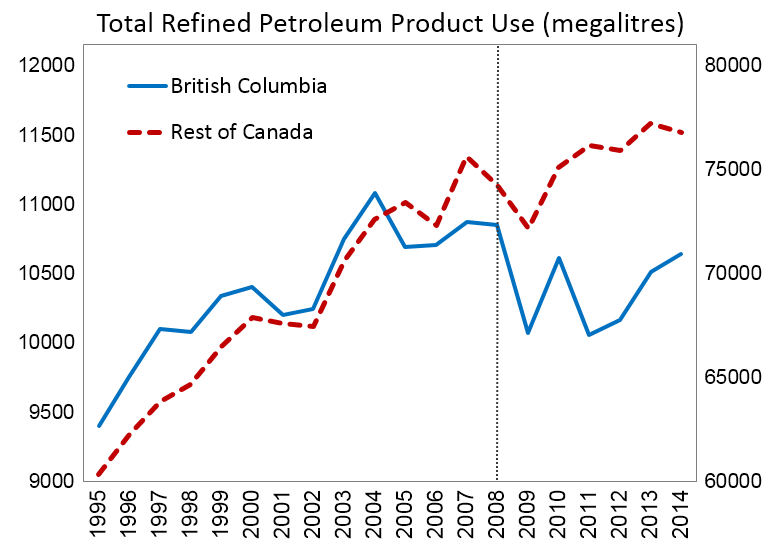
Petroleum product use in British Columbia declined after the implementation of the carbon tax in 2008.

The British Columbia carbon tax had been in place since 2008, but was repealed by the BC government on April 1, 2025. It was a British Columbia policy that added additional carbon taxes to fossil fuels burned for transportation, home heating, and electricity and reduces personal income taxes and corporate taxes by a roughly equal amount. The carbon tax was collected at the point of retail consumption (for example, at the pump for gasoline and diesel).

British Columbia's policy was unique in North America; only Quebec had a similar retail tax, but it was set at a much lower rate and did not include a matching tax shift. Quebec has since replaced its tax with a carbon market. Unlike most other governments, British Columbia's electricity portfolio largely consists of hydroelectric power, and its energy costs, even with the tax, are lower than in most countries.

== History ==
Public opinion polls in 2007 showed that the environment had replaced the economy and healthcare as the most important issue to a majority of respondents. The cultural change, which was brought about by greater media and political attention both inside and outside Canada, changed the political dynamic of British Columbia. Traditionally, the left-leaning BC New Democratic Party (NDP) had been seen as more green than the other of the two largest parties, the more free-market BC Liberal Party. However, in 2008, it was the Liberals that introduced the carbon tax and tax shift, which was thought to be a more market-friendly method of regulating carbon than the competing idea of cap-and-trade, which the NDP supported. During the 2009 British Columbia election, the NDP suggested replacing the tax with a cap-and-trade system, and the BC Conservatives also made repealing the carbon tax part of their platform, but the Liberals won another majority government.

In 2016, a similar measure was put on the ballot in neighbouring Washington State. Washington Initiative 732, like the British Columbia carbon tax, was to impose a steadily-rising tax on carbon emissions, while offsetting the state's sales tax and business tax/and to expand the state's tax credit for low-income families. The ballot initiative did not pass; however, another carbon tax plan, Washington Initiative 1631, has been proposed.

In March 2025, Prime Minister Mark Carney announced his intention to end the federal carbon tax. BC Premier David Eby announced that there would be no further increases to the carbon tax after April 1, 2025 and that the consumer carbon tax would be removed entirely by the end of the year.

== Initial implementation ==
On 19 February 2008, British Columbia announced its intention to implement a carbon tax of $10 per tonne of carbon dioxide equivalent (CO_{2}e) emissions (2.41 cents per litre on gasoline) beginning 1 July 2008, the first North American jurisdiction to implement such a tax. The tax was to increase until 2012, reaching a final price of $30 per tonne (7.2 cents per litre at the pumps). The tax was to be revenue neutral by reducing corporate and income taxes accordingly. The government was to reduce other taxes by $481 million over three years. In January 2010, the carbon tax was applied to biodiesel. Before the tax went into effect, the government of British Columbia sent out "rebate cheques" from expected revenues to all residents. In January 2013, the tax was collecting about $1 billion/year, which was rebated.

Unlike previous proposals, the legislation was to keep the pending carbon tax revenue neutral by reducing corporate and income taxes at an equivalent rate. The government also planned to reduce taxes above and beyond the carbon tax offset by $481 million over three years.

The tax was based on the following principles:

- All revenue is recycled through tax reductions – The government was required to demonstrate how all carbon tax revenue was to be returned to taxpayers through tax reductions.
- The tax rate increased gradually – to give individuals and businesses time to make adjustments and respect decisions made prior to the announcement of the tax.
- Protect low-income individuals and families – A refundable Low Income Climate Action Tax Credit helps offset the tax paid by low-income individuals and families.
- Broad base – Virtually all emissions from fuel combustion are taxed, with no exemptions except those required for integration with other climate actions.
- The tax would not, on its own, meet B.C.'s emission-reduction targets.

Many Canadians concluded that the carbon tax generally benefitted the British Columbian economy, in large part because its revenue neutral feature reduced personal income taxes. However some industries complained loudly that the tax had harmed them, notably cement manufacturers and farmers. Nevertheless, the tax attracted attention in the United States and elsewhere from those seeking an economically efficient way of reducing the emission of greenhouse gases without hurting economic growth.

=== 2010 expansion ===
In January 2010, the carbon tax was applied to biodiesel. Before the tax actually went into effect, the BC government had sent out "rebate cheques" from expected revenues to all residents of British Columbia as of December 31, 2007. In January 2013, the carbon tax was collecting about $1 billion each year, which was used to lower other taxes in British Columbia. BC Environment Minister Terry Lake said, "It makes sense, it's simple, it's well accepted."

== Rates ==
In April 2019, the carbon tax increased to $40 /t CO_{2}e, which is translated below into different fuel types. The carbon tax increased by units of $5/t until 2022, when the annual increase was raised to $15/t. The carbon tax was raised to $80/t in 2024. The carbon tax was eliminated on April 1, 2025.

Progression of carbon tax rates
Type of Fuel	Unit	July 1, 2012	2019	2024
Gasoline	¢/litre	6.67	8.89	17.61
Diesel (light fuel oil)	¢/litre	7.67	10.23	20.74
Jet fuel	¢/litre	7.83	10.44	19.59
Natural gas	¢/cubic metre	5.70	7.60	15.25
Propane	¢/litre	4.62	6.16	12.38
Coal - high heat value	$/tonne	62.31	83.08	141.80
Coal - low heat value	$/tonne	53.31	71.08	178.48

== Effects ==
According to the World Bank, British Columbia's carbon tax policy has been very effective in spurring fuel efficiency gains. Further, the resulting decreases in fuel consumption did not harm economic growth. On the contrary, the province has outperformed the rest of Canada since 2008.

=== Five-year review ===
A July 2013 report by Sustainable Prosperity, BC's Carbon Tax Shift After Five Years: An Environmental (and Economic) Success Story, suggested that the policy had been a major success. Since the tax had been in place, fossil fuel consumption per capita had dropped 17.4%, and fallen by 18.8% relative to the rest of Canada. Those reductions occurred across all the fuel types covered by the tax, not just vehicle fuel. BC's rate of economic growth (measured as GDP) had kept pace with the rest of Canada's over that time. The tax shift enabled BC to have one of Canada's lowest income tax rates, as of 2012. The aggregate effect of the tax shift was positive of taxpayers as a whole, in that cuts to income and other taxes exceeded carbon tax revenues by $500 million from 2008 to 2012.

The report was released to coincide with an internal review of the policy by the BC government, which ultimately decided to freeze the tax at 2012 levels for five years. It was also aimed to influence energy policy discussion as the First Ministers met at Niagara-on-the-Lake, Ontario. Critics of the report debated its findings in media. Jock Finlayson of the BC Business Council pointed out that the drop in fuel consumption might be due to cross-border shopping, as many BC residents are able to drive into Washington or Alberta to fuel their cars and trucks, as well as to a much larger gasoline levy implemented in Greater Vancouver (accounting for much of BC's population) to fund public transit development (TransLink) and that businesses were receiving fewer tax advantages from the plan than individuals. Aldyen Donnelly of WDA Consulting suggested that the success of the tax in reducing fuel consumption would cannibalize the potential revenue that it could generate, creating a tax waste, and that it fell more on the middle and lower-middle classes than on the most wealthy which made it a regressive tax. The supporter Mark Jaccard of Simon Fraser University defended the tax by saying that BC's aviation fuel usage, which is not subject to the carbon tax, "did not diverge from the Canadian pattern, supporting the argument that the carbon tax really did have an effect. And BC's disconnect from the rest of the country was evident for all taxed fuels, not just gasoline; so the argument that BC's divergence is caused by increased cross-border shopping for gasoline is not supported." Also, statistical analysis can factor out things like weather, background economic conditions, and other policies.

Although fossil fuel consumption initially dropped rapidly, the Great Recession also led to lower consumption globally. A report in 2015 suggested an 8.5% reduction to date in greenhouse gas emissions, which may also be affected by cross border purchases of vehicle fuel. Stats Canada reports that between 2007 and 2018 fuel consumption of gasoline in British Columbia has increased by 5.2%, while consumption in Canada as a whole increased 9.8%, suggesting the possibility that British Columbia's fuel consumption rose less than the rest of Canada's due to behavioral changes stemming from the tax, as the policy intended.

=== Later analyses ===
From the program’s start in 2007 to 2018, British Columbia’s gasoline consumption increased from 4,629,896 m^{3} to 5,590,356 m^{3} (20.7%) and diesel consumption increased from 1,796,661 m^{3} to 1,963,507 m^{3} (9.3%). However, during this same period, British Columbia’s real GDP (inflation-adjusted using chained 2017 Canadian dollars) increased from $229,376,000,000 to $292,182,000,000 (27.4%). Considering only gasoline and diesel, this indicates that emissions from these sources made up a smaller percentage of the overall economy a decade into the program than when it began, though this is an incomplete and ultimately correlational, rather than causal, analysis, since it does not account for the counterfactual.

Causal impact studies have also been published, however, with evidence generally showing that the tax has caused a decrease in emissions, albeit not to the scale that the province has hoped to achieved given, for example, Canada's signing of the 2015 Paris Climate Agreement.

A 2015 review of preceding academic literature on the program concludes in the abstract that “[e]mpirical and simulation models suggest that the tax has reduced emissions in the province by between 5% and 15% since being implemented” and that “polling data shows that the tax was initially opposed by the majority of the public, but that three years post-implementation, the public generally supported the carbon tax.” A 2019 academic research paper that looked only at diesel consumption found that the tax caused a statistically significant decrease in diesel consumption and diesel-generated emissions. A 2022 study using machine-learning-based difference-in-differences, synthetic control, and a break-detection approach showed that the policy “has reduced transportation emissions but not ‘yet’ led to large statistically significant reductions in aggregate CO_{2} emissions” because the “existing carbon taxes (and prices) are likely too low to be effective in the time frame since their introduction,” indicating that the carbon tax rate needs to increase in order to identify effects on economy-wide CO_{2} emissions with statistical significance, even if transportation-based CO_{2} emissions can be seen to decrease with statistical significance.

Beyond emissions and overall GDP, a 2017 paper found that “the BC carbon tax generated, on average, a small but statistically significant 0.74 percent annual increases in employment over the 2007–2013 period,” providing evidence that a revenue-neutral carbon tax may actually encourage, rather than adversely affect, employment, as critics of the policy had previously asserted. A 2021 counterfactual analysis showed “no significant negative impacts on GDP” and that the pass-through of the carbon tax into energy prices was complete. The authors conclude, as stated in the abstract, that “implementing revenue-neutral carbon taxation contributes to lowering harmful greenhouse gases into the atmosphere without hurting the economy.”

== Repeal of the carbon tax ==
On April 1, 2025, the carbon tax in British Columbia was repealed. The NDP led government indicated that elimination of the tax was a result of the "federal government removing the federal carbon tax on consumers". The BC government estimated that the removal of the tax would decrease government revenue by $1.99 billion in the 2025-26 fiscal year and did not provide any forecasts on how the elimination of the tax would affect greenhouse gas emissions in the province.

== See also ==
- Carbon pricing in Canada
