= 2024 Washington Initiative 2117 =

Proposed repeal of state carbon tax cap and trade laws

Initiative 2117
- November 5, 2024
- This measure would prohibit state agencies from imposing any type of carbon tax credit trading, and repeal legislation establishing a cap and invest program to reduce greenhouse gas emissions.
- Website: Washington Secretary of State

Results
Choice	Votes	%
✔ Yes	1,437,103	38.05%
✖ No	2,340,077	61.95%
Valid votes	3,777,180	100.00%
Invalid or blank votes	0	0.00%
Total votes	3,777,180	100.00%

Yes
90–100%
80–90%
70–80%
60–70%
50–60%
No
90–100%
80–90%
70–80%
60–70%
50–60%
Other
Tie
No votes

Initiative No. 2117 (I-2117) is a failed ballot initiative in the U.S. State of Washington that appeared on the ballot on November 5, 2024. The initiative was brought to the state legislature by Let's Go Washington, a Redmond-based political action committee founded by Brian Heywood. The initiative sought to repeal the Washington Climate Commitment Act (CCA), a cap and trade program adopted by the state in 2021 to begin pricing carbon emissions in order to create a downward pressure on state carbon emissions.

The effort to repeal the CCA through initiative was one of six ballot efforts spearheaded by Let's Go Washington in 2023. I-2117 collected a total of 466,072 signatures on the way to certification and introduction to the state legislature during their 2024 legislative session. I-2117 was one of three bills that Senate majority leader Andy Billig (D) and Speaker of the House Laurie Jenkins (D) announced on February 16, 2024, that the state legislature would not hold hearings on. This decision not to take action on the referred initiative placed the decision on the question to the November 2024 general election.

== Background ==
The establishment of a carbon tax has been a priority for Washington state Democrats since at least 2009, when HB1819 and SB 5735 were proposed to reduce greenhouse gas emissions through a cap and trade program. The effort to pass the bill failed to pass in either the 2009 or 2010 session, ultimately dying during the 2010 special session. Subsequent efforts to establish a carbon market involved the initiative process with the introduction of Initiative 732 in 2016 and Initiative 1631 in 2018, both of which failed to pass by a vote of the people. Supporters of establishing a carbon market finally found success in 2021 with the passage of the Climate Commitment Act (CCA) in 2021. The goal of the CCA is to reduce Washington state carbon to net zero by 2050 by establishing gradually declining caps on the amount of carbon businesses are permitted to release and requiring them to purchase allowances on a state-run market managed by the Department of Ecology for exceeding permitted carbon emission levels.

One of the main concerns around the passage of the CCA was the impact the climate legislation could have on the price of gas in the state. The particular impact on agricultural production was addressed in the legislation itself by establishing a five-year exemption for agricultural vehicles in particular. State officials in charge with implementing CCA also sought to reassure the public that the impact on gas prices would be negligible as they worked to bring the law into force in 2022. However, following implementation of the CCA on January 1, 2023, the state saw a rise in gas prices above what had been expected absent the CCA. As of July 1, 2023, the state of Washington had an average gas price of $4.95/gallon, which was $1.43/gallon higher than the national average for that day in 2023 and $0.81/gallon more above the national average than Washington had been in 2022. A former economist for the state of Washington had anticipated a surge in gas prices related to the CCA implementation and noted so in his reports, an act for which he claims to have later been fired.

The rise in gas prices tied to the CCA spurred efforts became the primary argument against the CCA adopted by conservative opponents adopted when making a push to repeal the CCA through initiative. The initiative repeal effort was led by Let's Go Washington, a PAC founded by the libertarian-leaning hedge fund manager Brian Heywood to circumvent the Democratic-dominated state legislature and attempt to repeal six laws that he and other conservatives found objectionable. Signatures for the repeal effort were certified in December, with the state legislature declining to take action on the proposals in February. This decision by legislative leaders put I-2117 on track for public consideration on the November 2024 general election ballot.

== Language and Impact ==
I-2117 places the following question before the citizens of Washington:

Initiative Measure No. 2117 concerns carbon tax credit trading.

This measure would prohibit state agencies from imposing any type of carbon tax credit trading, and repeal legislation establishing a cap and invest program to reduce greenhouse gas emissions.

Should this measure be enacted into law? Yes [ ] No [ ]

The CCA raised approximately $1.8 billion through its quarterly auction of carbon credits during its first full year of implementation in 2023. The revenues raised by carbon credit auctions are required by law to focus on three priority areas above the costs of administering the program itself (which is capped at 5% of revenues): reducing transportation-related carbon emissions, increasing community and ecological resilience, and reducing health disparities across economic and racial lines related to air pollution and other environmental contaminants. The largest immediate impact of the CCA's repeal on the state expenditure side of the ledger would be cuts to public transit and state transportation spending.

== Support for I-2117 ==
As of September 24, 2024, Let's Go Washington and the Taxpayers Accountability Alliance are registered as sponsors of the initiative. During a debate held on September 10, 2024, Republican gubernatorial candidate Dave Reichert reaffirmed his support of I-2117. Jaime Herrera Beutler, the Republican candidate for Commissioner of Public Lands, also opposed the initiative.

== Opposition to I-2117 ==
As of September 24, 2024, the 45th district Democratic Party, the Clean and Prosperous America No on 2117 Committee, Defend Washington, Fuse Voters, the Green Jobs PAC, the No on 2117 PAC, Protect Washington, the SEIU 775 Ballot Fund, and the Stop Greed PAC are registered as opponents of the initiative. During a debate held on September 10, 2024, Democratic gubernatorial candidate Bob Ferguson reaffirmed his opposition to I-2117.

== Public Opinion on I-2117 ==
Poll	Sponsor	Dates	Margin of Error	Mode	Sample Size	Support	Oppose	Undecided
SurveyUSA	Seattle Times, KING-TV, & UW Center for an Informed Public	Oct 9–14, 2024	± 5%	Online	703 LV	30%	48%	22%
Elway	Cascade PBS	Oct 8–12, 2024	± 5%	Live Phone & Text	401 LV	31%	46%	23%
Elway	Cascade PBS	Sep 3–6, 2024	± 5%	Live Phone & Text	403 RV	30%	46%	24%
SurveyUSA	Seattle Times, KING-TV, & UW Center for an Informed Public	July 10–13, 2024	± 5%	Online	708 LV	48%	34%	18%
Scott Rasmussen National Survey		May 20–23, 2024	± 3.5%		800 RV	45%	39%	16%
Elway	Cascade PBS	May 13–16, 2024	± 5%	Live Phone & Text	403 RV	41%	31%	28%
GBAO Strategies	Defend Washington	April 11–14, 2024	± 4%	Live Phone & Text	600 LV	37%	57%	6%

== Results ==
Initiative 2117 failed with only 38% support.

2024 Washington Initiative 2117
Choice	Votes	%
For	1,437,103	38.05
Against	2,340,077	61.95
Total	3,777,180	100.00
Source: Washington Secretary of State

=== By county ===
County results
County	No		Yes		Margin		Total votes
County	#	%	#	%	#	%	Total votes
Adams	2,207	42.64%	2,969	57.36%	-762	-14.72%	5,176
Asotin	5,463	49.61%	5,550	50.39%	-87	-0.79%	11,013
Benton	44,359	45.49%	53,165	54.51%	-8,806	-9.03%	97,524
Chelan	21,555	53.00%	19,118	47.00%	2,437	5.99%	40,673
Clallam	27,705	59.16%	19,124	40.84%	8,581	18.32%	46,829
Clark	149,601	57.13%	112,257	42.87%	37,344	14.26%	261,858
Columbia	958	39.75%	1,452	60.25%	-494	-20.50%	2,410
Cowlitz	28,264	49.76%	28,539	50.24%	-275	-0.48%	56,803
Douglas	9,723	47.73%	10,646	52.27%	-923	-4.53%	20,369
Ferry	1,737	43.85%	2,224	56.15%	-487	-12.29%	3,961
Franklin	13,262	44.64%	16,447	55.36%	-3,185	-10.72%	29,709
Garfield	479	35.96%	853	64.04%	-374	-28.08%	1,332
Grant	14,991	43.21%	19,705	56.79%	-4,714	-13.59%	34,696
Grays Harbor	19,595	53.81%	16,823	46.19%	2,772	7.61%	36,418
Island	31,312	61.93%	19,251	38.07%	12,061	23.85%	50,563
Jefferson	17,832	74.10%	6,233	25.90%	11,599	48.20%	24,065
King	816,733	74.76%	275,810	25.24%	540,923	49.51%	1,092,543
Kitsap	96,314	63.27%	55,910	36.73%	40,404	26.54%	152,224
Kittitas	12,195	47.80%	13,317	52.20%	-1,122	-4.40%	25,512
Klickitat	6,772	51.83%	6,295	48.17%	477	3.65%	13,067
Lewis	18,793	42.75%	25,169	57.25%	-6,376	-14.50%	43,962
Lincoln	2,379	34.44%	4,528	65.56%	-2,149	-31.11%	6,907
Mason	19,315	54.27%	16,275	45.73%	3,040	8.54%	35,590
Okanogan	10,491	52.25%	9,588	47.75%	903	4.50%	20,079
Pacific	7,861	57.28%	5,863	42.72%	1,998	14.56%	13,724
Pend Oreille	3,438	41.56%	4,834	58.44%	-1,396	-16.88%	8,272
Pierce	244,286	57.94%	177,342	42.06%	66,944	15.88%	421,628
San Juan	9,367	75.31%	3,071	24.69%	6,296	50.62%	12,438
Skagit	38,788	57.26%	28,957	42.74%	9,831	14.51%	67,745
Skamania	3,558	50.85%	3,439	49.15%	119	1.70%	6,997
Snohomish	242,764	60.71%	157,127	39.29%	85,637	21.42%	399,891
Spokane	149,444	53.91%	127,788	46.09%	21,656	7.81%	277,232
Stevens	10,150	37.09%	17,219	62.91%	-7,069	-25.83%	27,369
Thurston	100,835	63.38%	58,268	36.62%	42,567	26.75%	159,103
Wahkiakum	1,483	50.72%	1,441	49.28%	42	1.44%	2,924
Walla Walla	15,088	52.89%	13,438	47.11%	1,650	5.78%	28,526
Whatcom	86,280	64.62%	47,239	35.38%	39,041	29.24%	133,519
Whitman	11,369	58.56%	8,046	41.44%	3,323	17.12%	19,415
Yakima	43,331	50.91%	41,783	49.09%	1,548	1.82%	85,114
Totals	2,340,077	61.95%	1,437,103	38.05%	902,974	23.91%	3,777,180
