= Washington carbon tax =

Washington carbon tax may refer to either of two ballot initiatives in Washington, United States that sought to introduce a carbon tax:

- 2016 Washington Initiative 732, a 2016 ballot initiative to levy a carbon tax and reduce the state sales tax
- 2018 Washington Initiative 1631, a 2018 ballot initiative to levy a carbon tax and use the resulting revenue to support air quality and energy projects
