= 2016 Idaho Democratic presidential caucuses =

- March 22, 2016

Candidate	Bernie Sanders	Hillary Clinton
Home state	Vermont	New York
Delegate count	18	5
Popular vote	18,640	5,065
Percentage	78.04%	21.21%
Election results by county
Sanders
50 – 60%
60 – 70%
70 – 80%
80 – 90%
100%
Clinton
50 – 60%

The 2016 Idaho Democratic presidential caucuses took place on March 22 in the U.S. state of Idaho as one of the Democratic Party's primaries ahead of the 2016 presidential election.

Voters convened in each of Idaho's 44 counties at 7 p.m. Mountain Standard Time/6 p.m Pacific Standard Time to proportionally allocate the state's 27 delegates to the Democratic National Convention in Philadelphia in July.

== Campaigning ==
Both major candidates made efforts to either send surrogates or campaign themselves in Idaho before the caucuses took place. On March 17, Olympian Michelle Kwan campaigned for Hillary Clinton at Boise State University, where she spoke to about 150 supporters. On March 18, Bernie Sanders spoke at a local high school in Idaho Falls, Idaho, drawing approximately 3,200 supporters. On March 21, the day before the Democratic caucuses, Sanders spoke to approximately 7,000 supporters at the Taco Bell Arena on the campus of Boise State University.

== Aftermath ==
The caucus was later regarded as having prepared the ground for the Paulette Jordan gubernatorial campaign two years later, inasmuch as it demonstrated the popularity of progressive policy proposals amongst the Idahoan left.

== Opinion polling ==
Poll source	Date	1st	2nd	Other
Caucus results	March 24, 2016	Bernie Sanders; 78.04%	Hillary Clinton; 21.21%	Other; 0.75%
Dan Jones & Associates Margin of error: ± 4.0% Sample size: 601	February 17–26, 2016	Bernie Sanders; 47%	Hillary Clinton; 45%	
Dan Jones & Associates Margin of error: ± 4.02% Sample size: 595	October 28 – November 4, 2015	Hillary Clinton; 55%	Bernie Sanders; 35%	Other candidates 4% Don't know 6%
Dan Jones & Associates Margin of error: ± 4% Sample size: 586	September 22–30, 2015	Hillary Clinton; 38%	Bernie Sanders; 36%	Joe Biden 16% Other/DK/NR 10%
Dan Jones & Associates Margin of error: ± ? Sample size: ?	Published August 9, 2015	Hillary Clinton; 44%	Bernie Sanders; 22%	Joe Biden 15% Other/DK/NR 19%
Idaho Politics Weekly Margin of error: ± ? Sample size: ?	June 17 – July 1, 2015	Hillary Clinton; 19%	Bernie Sanders; 12%	Joe Biden 10% Someone else 18% Don't know 32%

== Results ==
2016 Democratic Party's presidential nominating process in Idaho – Summary of results –
Candidate	Popular vote		Estimated delegates		
Candidate	Count	Percentage	Pledged	Unpledged	Total
Bernie Sanders	18,640	78.04%	18	2	20
Hillary Clinton	5,065	21.21%	5	1	6
Rocky De La Fuente	4	0.02%			
Uncommitted	175	0.73%		1	1
Total	23,884	100%	23	4	27

Idaho Democratic Party 2016 caucus state delegate election results April 1, 2016
Candidate	CD	Popular vote		State convention delegates		
Candidate	CD	Count	Percentage	Pledged	Unpledged	Total
Hillary Clinton	CD1	2,319	21.39%	45		45
Hillary Clinton	CD2	2,746	21.05%	41		41
Hillary Clinton	Total	5,065	21.21%	86		86
Bernie Sanders	CD1	8,454	78.00%	154		154
Bernie Sanders	CD2	10,186	78.08%	144		144
Bernie Sanders	Total	18,640	78.04%	298		298
Rocky De La Fuente	CD1	2	0.02%	0		0
Rocky De La Fuente	CD2	2	0.02%	0		0
Rocky De La Fuente	Total	4	0.02%	0		0
Uncommitted	CD1	64	0.59%	0		0
Uncommitted	CD2	111	0.85%	0		0
Uncommitted	Total	175	0.73%	0		0
Grand Total	CD1	10,839	100%	199		199
Grand Total	CD2	13,045	100%	185		185
Grand Total	Total	23,884	100%	384		384
Source: Idaho Democratic Party 2016 Caucus State Delegate Election results April 1, 2016

== Gallery ==
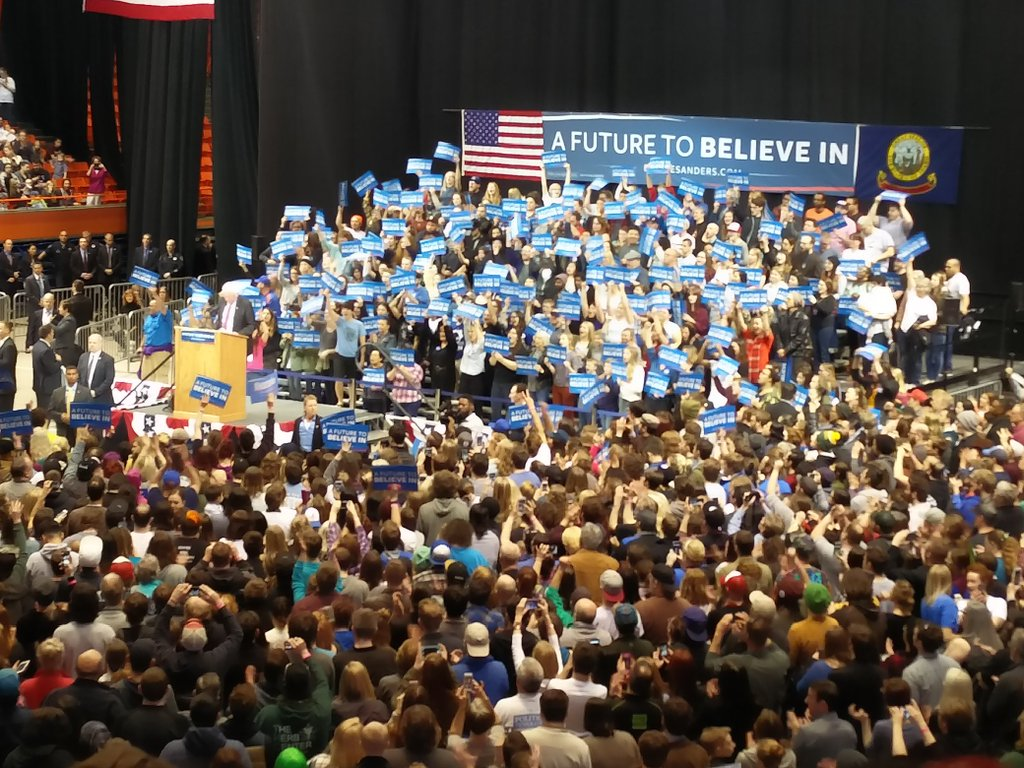
Sen. Sanders speaks to a packed arena at Boise State University the day before the caucuses.

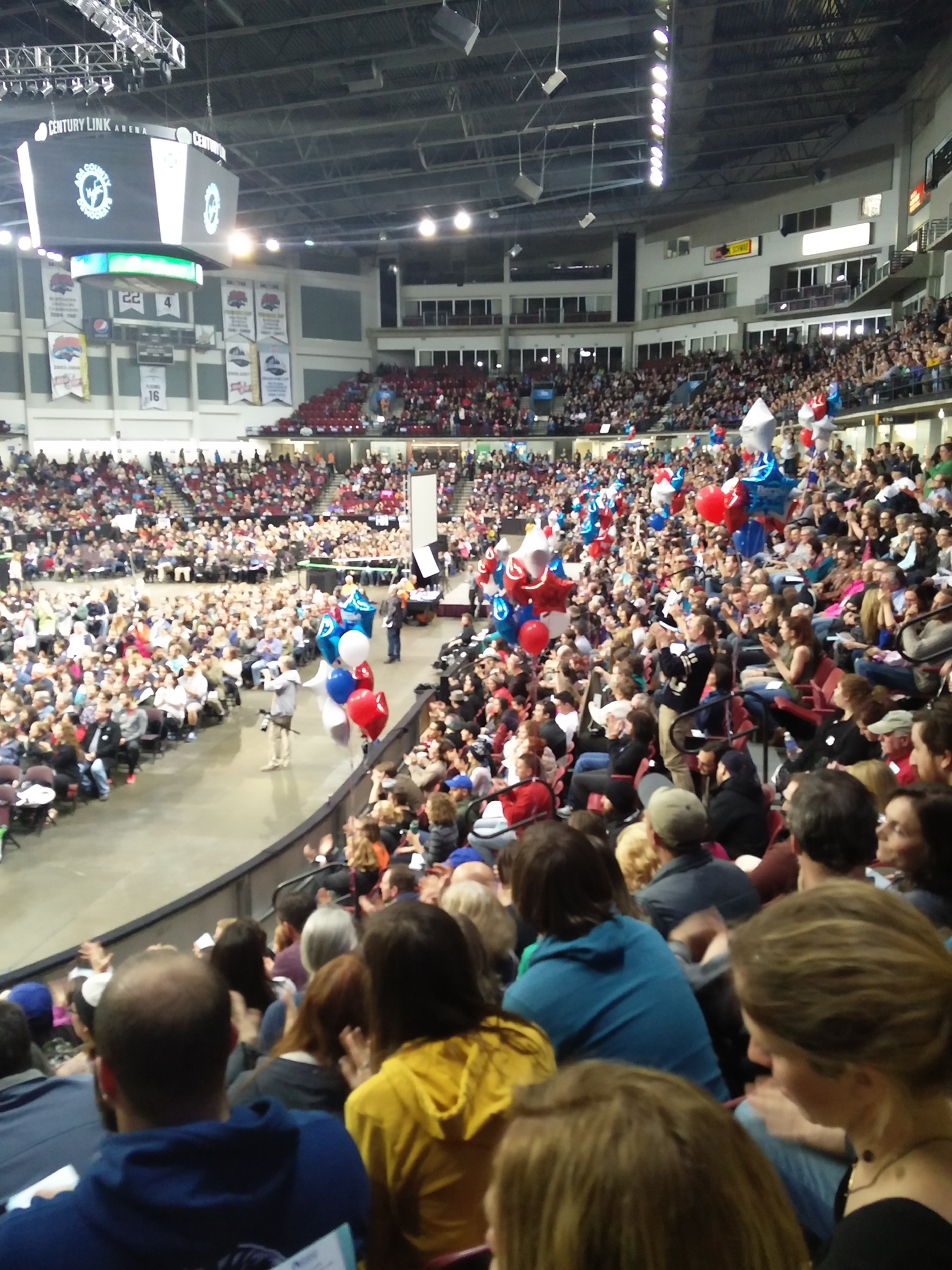
A portion of the Bernie Sanders side at the Ada County caucus

== Analysis ==
Sanders won Idaho by a four-to-one margin over Hillary Clinton, a similarly large landslide win to that of Barack Obama over Clinton in the Idaho caucuses eight years prior. In a majority white, rural, and ideologically libertarian electorate, Sanders had the upper hand. He won all counties but one on election day, carrying the major cities of Boise in Ada County, Pocatello in Bannock County, and Idaho Falls in Bonneville County. He was also bolstered by rural support from Southern Idaho to the Northern Panhandle, and in Central Idaho including Treasure Valley. Such regions are among the most remote and radically conservative areas of the country.

The Ada County caucus, held at CenturyLink Arena, which was the largest caucus in U.S. history, easily broke the 2008 record, with many voters waiting in line for three or four hours in brisk wind chill. The mile-long line stretched for several city blocks; more than 9,100 voters participated in what was called a "massive" turnout, especially given Idaho's status as a Republican stronghold.

Sanders won 78.0% of the vote statewide; only his home state of Vermont, Alaska, and Utah had given him a wider margin of victory.
