= Cliff Mass =

American college professor, author, weather commentator

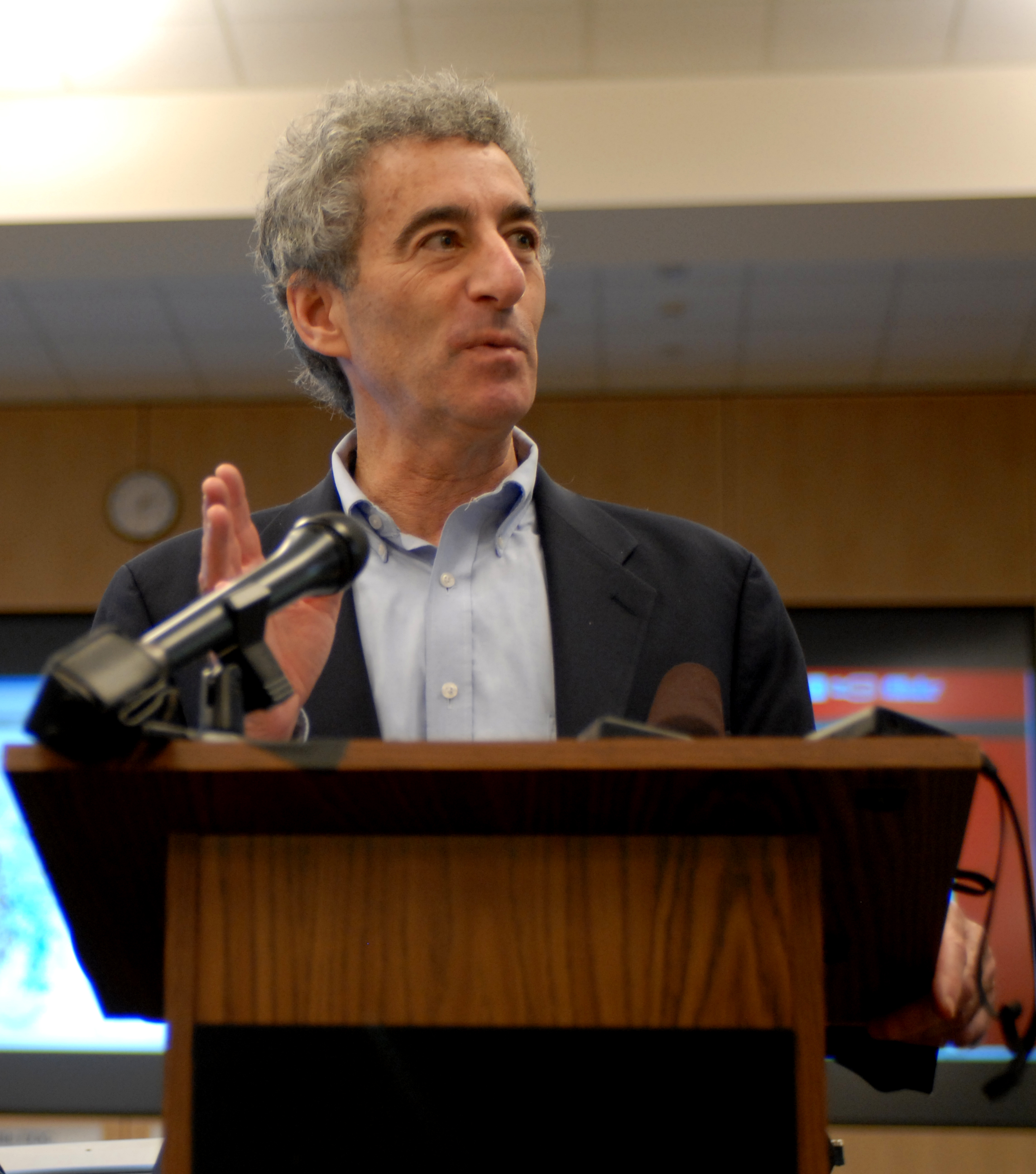
- Mass in 2011
- Born: Clifford F. Mass; 1952/53; Far Rockaway, New York
- Education: Cornell University (B.S.); University of Washington (Ph.D.)
- Scientific career
- Fields: Atmospheric Sciences

Clifford F. Mass is an American professor of Atmospheric Sciences at the University of Washington. His research focuses on numerical weather modeling and prediction, the role of topography in the evolution of weather systems, regional climate modeling, and the weather of the Pacific Northwest. He is a fellow of the American Meteorological Society, past-president of the Puget Sound American Meteorological Society chapter, and past chair of the College of the Environment College Council.

His book The Weather of the Pacific Northwest is one of the best-selling titles from the University of Washington Press. He maintains a popular weather blog and gives frequent public lectures on topics ranging from Washington State weather history to the impact of climate change on global and regional weather patterns. He formerly had standing engagements to speak on Seattle-area public radio stations KUOW and KNKX before each of these stations chose to discontinue their relationships with Mass due to Mass's comments on non-weather-related topics.

== Education ==
Mass received a B.S. in physics from Cornell University in 1974. As an undergraduate, Mass performed research on Martian weather with astrophysicist Carl Sagan, and on the role of sun spots and volcanic eruptions on historical climate conditions with climatologist Stephen Schneider. He received his PhD in Atmospheric Sciences from the University of Washington in 1978 with a dissertation on the role of African wave disturbances and climate variation in the Sahel region.

== Academic career ==
Before joining the faculty of the University of Washington, Mass was a professor of meteorology at the University of Maryland from 1978 to 1981. He leads the University of Washington Mesoscale Analysis and Forecasting Group and is the chief scientist of the Northwest Modeling Consortium. He has published over 120 articles in peer-reviewed scientific venues, and served on the board of over a dozen regional and national meteorological committees, conferences, and scientific journals.

== Outreach and scientific advocacy ==
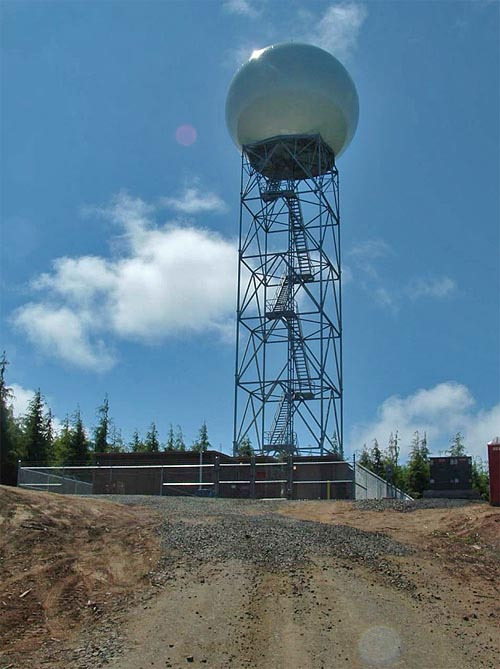
Mass advocated for the Langley Hill Doppler weather radar, which went online in 2011.

Mass maintains a popular weblog in which he posts regular articles on meteorology, Pacific Northwest weather history, and the impacts of climate change written for the general public.

Mass has stated publicly that he shares the scientific consensus that global warming is real and that human activity is a major cause of warming trend in the late 20th and 21st centuries. According to Mass, "Global warming is an extraordinarily serious issue, and scientists have a key role to play in communicating what is known and what is not about this critical issue." He has been critical of the Paris Climate accord for not going far enough to address the negative impacts of climate change. Mass has also expressed concern when media outlets and environmental organizations have made, in his opinion, exaggerated claims about the current impacts of climate change. Mass has questioned statements of climate change as the cause of specific weather events. For example, Mass concluded that global warming was not a central factor in the 2021 Western North America heat wave. The authors of a World Weather Attribution report asserting the connection criticized Mass's analysis of their work.

Charles Mudede, in The Stranger, called Mass "a very dangerous weatherperson" from a philosophical standpoint, comparing Mass's comments on the uncertainty of anthropogenic global warming to French philosopher Quentin Meillassoux's statement that "there is no God now, but there could be one in the future".

Mass advocated for the acquisition and installation of the Langley Hill Doppler weather radar in 2011, the first on the Washington coast.

== Opinions on non-weather-related topics ==
Mass has used numerous media, including radio shows, Twitter accounts, and a personal blog, to broadcast opinions about numerous topics not related to the weather. These have sometimes generated controversy.

Starting around 2008, KUOW warned Mass to stop voicing his opinions about subjects such as math education on his weather segment on the show Weekday. The show's host, Steve Scher, noted that holders of opposing viewpoints complained to the station that they deserved equal time. Scher in 2011 removed Mass's segment from Weekday, prompting hundreds of emails to be sent to the station and a protest at the station. Mass later wrote an article defending his actions in The Stranger.

In 2016, Mass advocated in favor of Washington Initiative I-732, which would have been the first carbon tax measure in the United States. Mass later advocated against a different initiative to enact a carbon fee, Washington Initiative I-1631, in 2018, suggesting it was highly regressive and ineffective. Both measures were rejected. His 2018 opposition was used by the "No on 1631" campaign, and led to two dissenting opinion articles from local news sources.

On his personal blog on August 5, 2020, Mass likened to Kristallnacht the property damage in downtown Seattle, calling photos of the damage "eerily similar to those of 80 years ago". The context for this remark was the mid-July events of the George Floyd protests in Seattle. He subsequently defended the comparison in the comments to that entry. The next day, KNKX announced that it would stop airing Weather with Cliff Mass, effective immediately, citing "offensive and inaccurate" rhetoric in that personal blog post. Mass temporarily removed the words "Kristallnacht" and "Brownshirts" from his post, describing the passage that contained them as "a source of distraction to some", before restoring them.

== Personal life ==
Mass, who is Jewish, has stated the value of tikkun olam has informed his approach to science.

== Bibliography ==
- The Weather of the Pacific Northwest. University of Washington Press. 2008. ISBN 9780295988474. OCLC 836835255.
