= Yoram Bauman =

American economist and stand-up comedian

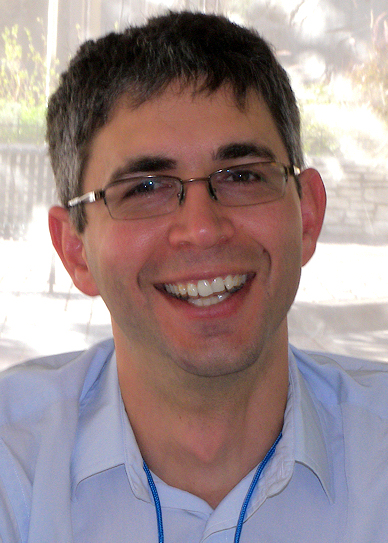
Yoram Bauman at the 2010 Texas Book Festival.

Yoram Keyes Bauman (born November 19, 1973) is an American economist and stand-up comedian.

== Biography ==
Bauman grew up in San Francisco. He received an undergraduate degree in mathematics at Reed College in Portland, Oregon. In 2003, Bauman attended graduate school at the University of Washington in Seattle, Washington, where he obtained a Ph.D. in economics.

Bauman is an environmental economist. He works as a professor at the University of Washington, in the Program on the Environment, Bainbridge Graduate School, and Lakeside School. He is the co-author of the 1998 book Tax Shift which advocates switching taxation from income and property to resource consumption.

Bauman bills himself as the "world's first and only stand-up economist." His video Principles of Economics, translated has more than 1 million views on YouTube.

== Political activism ==
Bauman is a strong supporter of a carbon tax, in particular, a revenue-neutral carbon tax. He started an organization called CarbonWA which gathered signatures to put a revenue-neutral carbon tax on the ballot for the Washington elections, 2016. This initiative, known as Washington Initiative 732, would have imposed a steadily increasing tax on emissions of carbon dioxide, and used the revenue to offset other taxes. Washington relies on a sales tax for much of its revenue, making its state tax code one of the most regressive tax codes in the nation. Had it passed, its supporters asserted that it would have decreased the sales tax, eliminated the business and occupation tax on manufacturing, and expanded the state's earned-income tax credit for low-income households.

== Selected publications ==
- The Cartoon Introduction to Economics, Volume 1: Microeconomics (with Grady Klein)
- The Cartoon Introduction to Economics, Volume 2: Macroeconomics (with Grady Klein)
- Stand-Up Economics: The Micro Textbook
- Tax Shift (with Alan Durning)
- The Cartoon Introduction to Climate Change (with Grady Klein)
- The Cartoon Introduction to Calculus (with Grady Klein)
