= American Fuel and Petrochemical Manufacturers =

American trade association

- Nickname: AFPM
- Formation: 1902; 124 years ago
- Purpose: Trade association
- Website: www.afpm.org
- Formerly called: National Petroleum Association; National Petroleum Refiners Association; National Petrochemical & Refiners Association

American Fuel and Petrochemical Manufacturers (AFPM) is an American trade association, founded in 1902 as the National Petroleum Association. It became the National Petroleum Refiners Association in 1961, the National Petrochemical & Refiners Association in 1998 and became the AFPM in 2012. AFPM is a trade association representing American manufacturers of virtually the entire U.S. supply of gasoline, diesel, jet fuel, other fuels and home heating oil, and petrochemicals. AFPM represents companies including Chevron Corporation, ExxonMobil, Koch Industries, Marathon Petroleum and Valero Energy.

In 2018 AFPM and its members spent over $30 million to defeat 2018 Washington Initiative 1631, a ballot initiative to introduce a carbon tax in Washington state. Lobbyists for AFPM worked to pass West Virginia's Critical Infrastructure Protection Act, a 2021 law creating felony penalties for protests targeting oil and gas facilities, which was described by its sponsor John Kelly as having been "requested by the natural gas industry".
