= Quebec carbon market =

Carbon market in Quebec

The Canadian province of Quebec is the first Canadian province with an emission cap-and-trade market (ETS), introduced in 2013. Polluters need to buy emission allowances, which increase in price each year. The resulting revenue is reinvested in Quebec's 2030 Plan for a Green Economy through the Electrification and Climate Change Fund. Since 2014, the Quebec carbon market is linked with the California cap-and-trade market, forming the largest emission trading market in North America. The scheme has generated over 11.8 billion Canadian dollars in revenue for the province from its introduction to 2026.

Quebec's carbon emissions have dropped by 13.2% in 2020 below the baseline measure, short of the targeted goal of 20%. This was counter to the trend of increasing emissions in the years before and was caused by the COVID-19 pandemic. However, because the carbon market is linked with California, some emission reductions in the US are also being counted towards the reduction in emissions. Emissions in 2020 total 62.8 MT of CO2 equivalent with this system, or 26.6% below the baseline.

== History ==
In 2006, Quebec introduced its first Climate Action Plan. Subsequently in 2007, Quebec was the first province to raise taxes on carbon emissions. When announcing the new tax, Quebec Natural Resources Minister Claude Béchard said industries would absorb the tax, which would total CA$200 million in revenue annually, instead of passing on the cost to consumers. Of the 50 companies affected, the hardest hit would be oil companies, which would pay "about CA$69 million a year for gasoline, CA$36 million for diesel fuel, and CA$43 million for heating oil". The tax would also affect natural gas distributors, which would pay about CA$39 million annually, and electricity distributor Hydro-Québec, which would pay CA$4.5 million annually for its Sorel-Tracy, Quebec-based thermal energy plant.

It later joined the Western Climate Initiative, with its stated goal of reducing carbon emissions through introducing a market-based program. Quebec announced its cap-and-trade carbon market in 2011, and it came into effect in 2013. It was linked with the California carbon market in 2014. From 2015, the scope of covered emissions has gradually increased, covering over 80% of emissions by 2020. It was announced in June 2026 that the carbon market would be further linked with the US State of Washington, linking its cap-and-invest scheme in 2027.

== See also ==
- Western Climate Initiative
- Carbon emission trading
- British Columbia carbon tax
- Climate change policy of Canada
- Climate change policy of California
