= 2016 Hawaii Democratic presidential caucuses =

- March 26, 2016

Candidate	Bernie Sanders	Hillary Clinton
Home state	Vermont	New York
Delegate count	19	13
Popular vote	23,530	10,125
Percentage	69.8%	30.0%
Election results by county.
Sanders
60 – 70%
70 – 80%
No Data
Kalawao County

The 2016 Hawaii Democratic presidential caucuses were held on March 26 in the U.S. state of Hawaii as one of the Democratic Party's statewide nomination contests ahead of the 2016 presidential election.

While the State of Hawaii's primary for the 2016 Senate and House elections are scheduled to be held only on August 13, both the Democratic Party and the Republican Party opted out to hold their own caucuses. With the Republican caucus having taken place earlier in March, the Republican Party did not hold any caucuses on March 26, while the Democratic Party held concurrent caucuses in Alaska and in Washington state.

== Presidential Preference Poll ==
The Democratic Presidential Preference Poll (PPP) was a separate event from the caucus although held on the same day as the caucus. Voters needed to show that they were registered Democrats (they could register on the day of voting) and that they lived in the precinct where they voted (a driver's license or an electric bill was sufficient). Once these conditions were met, they were handed a paper ballot to fill in and deposit in the ballot box. When there were no more voters, the PPP was closed. The precinct officers publicly hand counted the ballots, recorded them, then sealed them in an envelope that was delivered to the District Officers, then to the County Officers, and finally the State Office where they were counted again. The Results displayed here are from the PPP. The caucus was held immediately after these events but had no role in selection of the Presidential delegates.

== Results ==
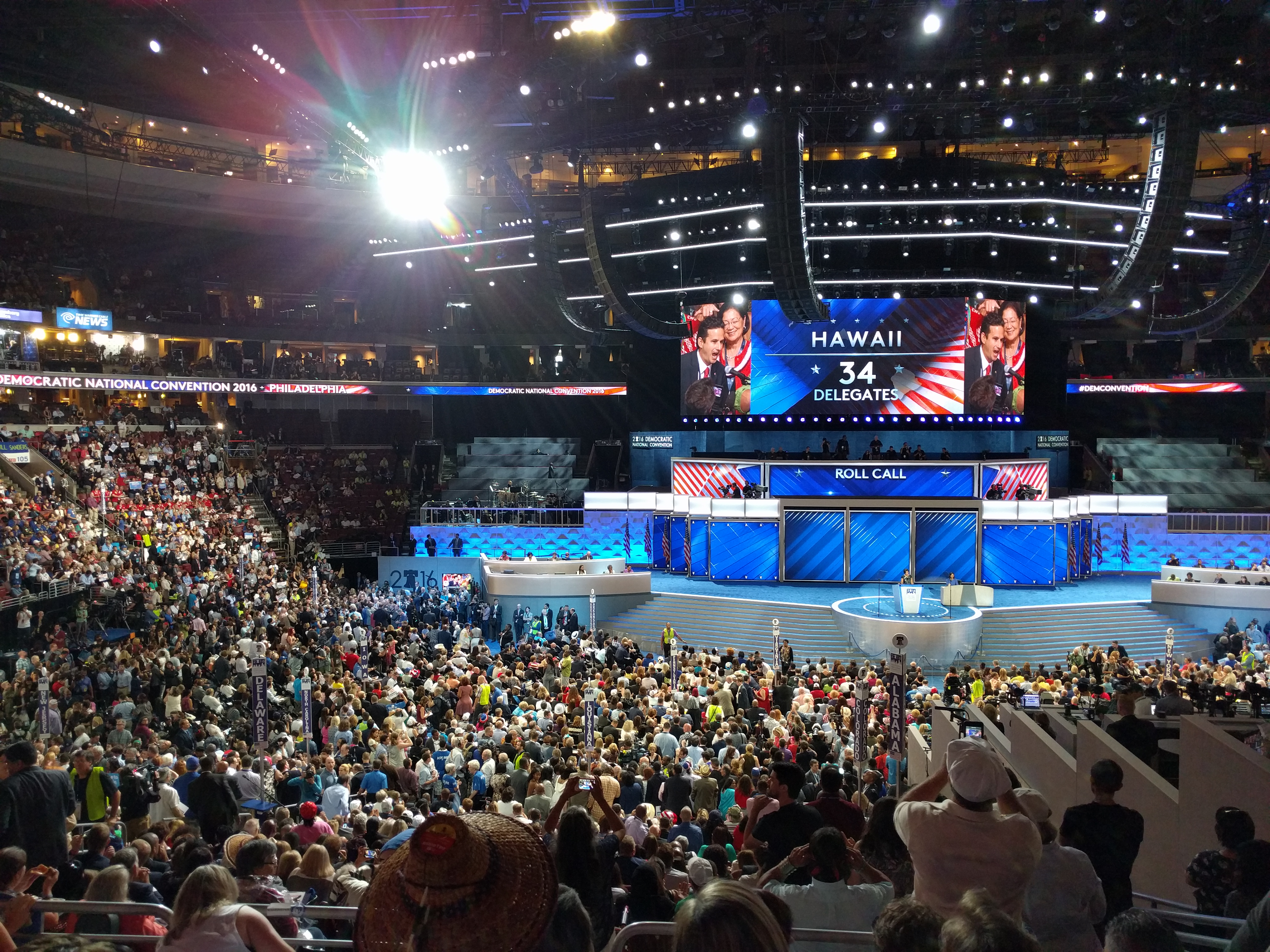
Hawaiian delegation participates in the roll call vote at the 2016 Democratic National Convention

2016 Democratic Party's presidential nominating process in Hawaii – Summary of results –
Candidate	Popular vote		Estimated delegates		
Candidate	Count	Percentage	Pledged	Unpledged	Total
Bernie Sanders	23,530	69.8%	17	2	19
Hillary Clinton	10,125	30.0%	8	5	13
Rocky De La Fuente	12	0.0%			
Martin O'Malley (withdrawn)	6	0.0%			
Uncommitted	43	0.1%	0	2	2
Total	33,716	100%	25	9	34

== Analysis ==
Sanders received one of his largest wins in Hawaii, carrying all four counties and every island in the state. He was aided by his high-profile endorsement from Democratic Congresswoman Tulsi Gabbard, who ran ads for Sanders encouraging people to caucus for him. Sanders' worst performance was in Oahu which contains the capital city of Honolulu, where he received 63% of the vote. Sanders's victory in Hawaii showed that he could win in a state with a majority non-white electorate. Sanders had had poor results in states with large African-American and Latino populations up until this point of the campaign.

At a rally in Wisconsin on March 26, Sanders told supporters "We knew from day one that politically we were going to have a hard time in the Deep South, but we knew things were going to improve when we headed west."
