= Langley Hill Doppler radar =

Weather radar in Washington state, United States

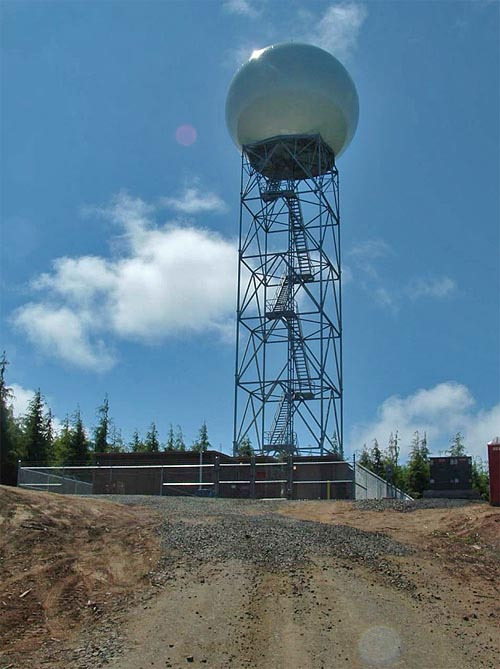
- Langley Hill radar in August, 2011
- Country of origin: United States (Washington State)
- Introduced: September 2011
- Type: NEXRAD Weather radar
- Frequency: 2,700 to 3,000 MHz (S band)
- Altitude: 250 ft (76 m)
- Azimuth: 0-360º
- Elevation: >0.2º
- Power: 750 kW
- Other names: KLGX

The Langley Hill Doppler radar (KLGX) is a National Weather Service NEXRAD Doppler weather radar station on the Pacific coast of Washington State, in the United States. Prior to its construction, Washington's Olympic Peninsula coast was the only portion of the U.S. coastline without weather radar coverage, and "virtually no radar coverage [is] available over the ocean, where the majority of western Washington's weather originates" according to a Weather Service report to the United States Congress.

== History ==
During the 1990s, the National Weather Service (NWS) replaced older WSR-74 radars across the United States with WSR-88D radars, building out the NEXRAD network. In the Pacific Northwest, radars were placed on Camano Island, at Scappoose near Portland, on the top of Mt. Ashland near Medford, close to Spokane and Pendleton. This left gaps of coverage along the Washington coast due to the mountainous terrain.

In the late 1990s, a group of university and media meteorologists were joined by local interested groups in forestry, fishing, and municipalities to call for an extra radar to fill the gap. A major motivation for the station was early detection of Pacific Northwest windstorms; a proponent, Professor Cliff Mass of the University of Washington, said it would provide an additional 6 to 12 hour storm warning to residents of the Pacific Northwest. In January and February 2001, a research radar placed at Westport, Washington clearly showed the structure of approaching storms and documented heavy precipitation on the coastal mountains. Even NWS forecasters noted the substantial value to their forecasts.

However, it was not before the involvement of Senator Maria Cantwell in 2008 that the project began to be pushed in front of Congress. Its location was announced in early 2011, construction started in March, and the unit was commissioned in September 2011.

== Location ==
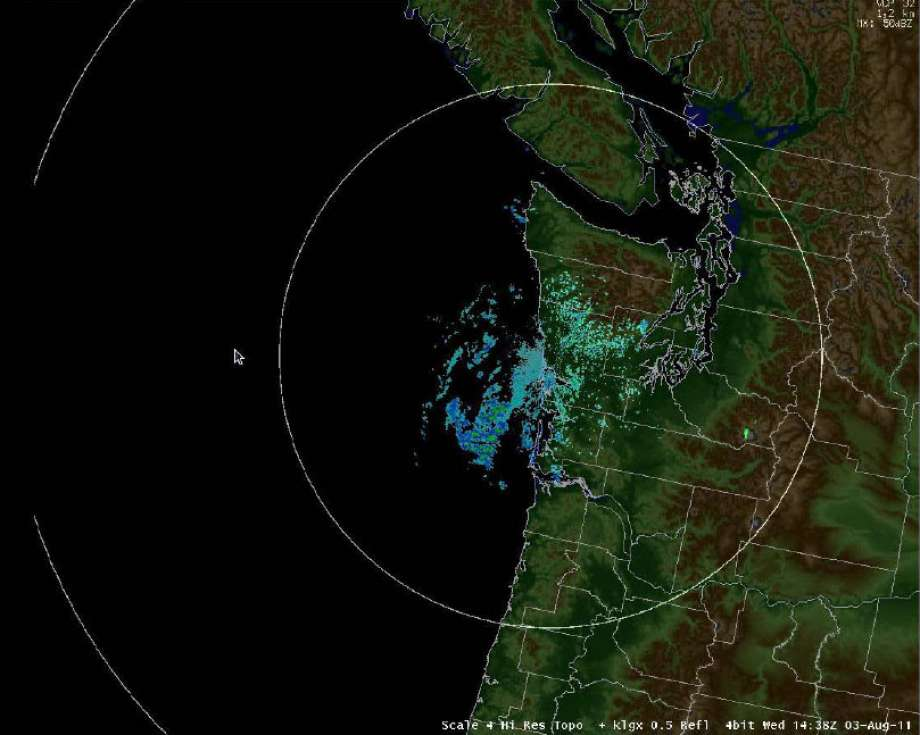
One of the system's first images during checkout in August, 2011.

The radar dome, the first on Washington's coast, is on a 130-foot (40 m) steel tower atop a 249-foot (76 m) high hill between Copalis Beach and Copalis Crossing, off State Route 109. Prior to its construction, coastal coverage from the nearest radar at Camano Island on Puget Sound was limited by the Olympic Mountains. This radar (longitude 124.107° west) and KBHX at the Lost Coast near Eureka, California (40.499°N 124.292°W) were the westernmost weather radars in the continental United States as of 2013.

The image to the left shows the coverage of the radar from the Salish Sea and southern Vancouver Island near top of frame, the entire Washington coast inside in the inner circle, and the central Oregon coast near bottom.

== Technology ==
The radar is a NEXRAD WSR‐88D, and was one of the first in the nation to be upgraded to dual polarization capability on September 21, 2011. It is the only operational WSR-88D that scans as low as 0.2 degrees above the horizon, which sometimes causes image artifacts due to sea clutter.
