= 2016 United States presidential election in Alaska =

- November 8, 2016
- Turnout: 60.77% ▲

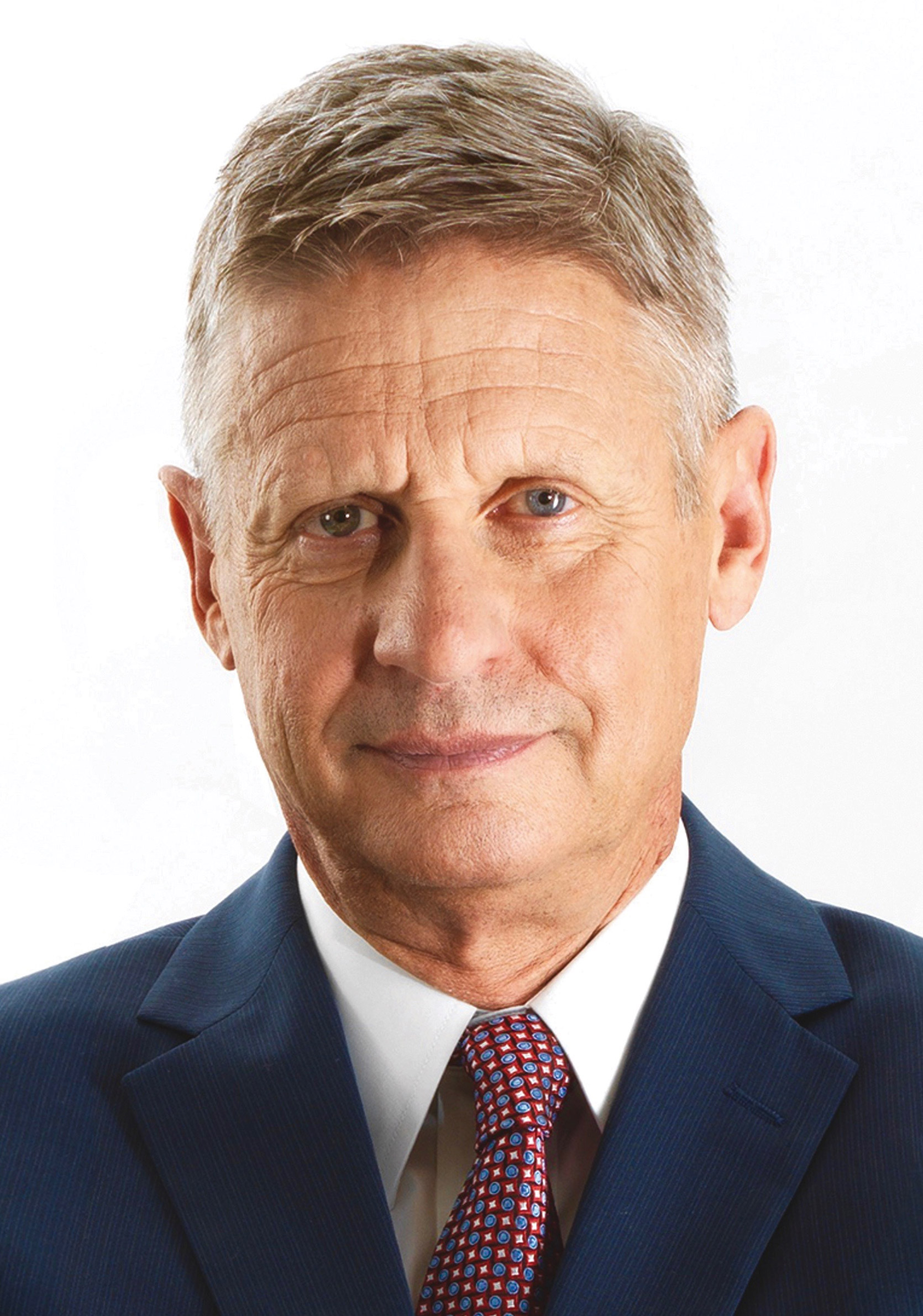
Nominee	Donald Trump	Hillary Clinton	Gary Johnson
Party	Republican	Democratic	Libertarian
Home state	New York	New York	New Mexico
Running mate	Mike Pence	Tim Kaine	Bill Weld
Electoral vote	3	0	0
Popular vote	163,387	116,454	18,725
Percentage	51.28%	36.55%	5.88%

Trump
30–40%
40–50%
50–60%
60–70%
70–80%
80–90%
Clinton
30–40%
40–50%
50–60%
60–70%
70–80%
80–90%
90–100%
President before election
Barack Obama
Democratic
Elected President
Donald Trump
Republican

The 2016 United States presidential election in Alaska was held on Tuesday, November 8, 2016, as part of the nationwide presidential election in which all 50 states plus the District of Columbia participated. Alaska voters chose electors to represent them in the Electoral College via a popular vote, pitting the Republican Party's nominee, businessman Donald Trump, and running mate Indiana Governor Mike Pence against Democratic Party nominee, former Secretary of State Hillary Clinton, and her running mate Virginia Senator Tim Kaine. Alaska has three electoral votes in the Electoral College.

Trump carried the state with 51.28% of the vote, while Clinton received 36.55% of the vote. This marked a return to Alaska's streak of giving Democrats under 40% of the vote share, after Barack Obama won just over 40% in 2012. Alaska has voted Republican in every election since 1968, and since its admission to the Union in 1959, it has only voted for the Democratic candidate on one occasion: Lyndon B. Johnson in 1964.

== Caucuses ==
The two major parties held caucuses on different days: Republicans on March 1, and Democrats on March 26.

=== Democratic caucuses ===
2016 Democratic Party's presidential nominating process in Alaska – Summary of results –
Candidate	Popular vote		District delegates		Estimated delegates		
Candidate	Count	Percentage	Count	Percentage	Pledged	Unpledged	Total
Bernie Sanders	8,447	79.61%	441	81.52%	13	1	14
Hillary Clinton	2,146	20.23%	100	18.48%	3	1	4
Rocky De La Fuente	1	<0.01%					
Uncommitted	16	0.15%			0	2	2
Total	10,610	100%	541	100%	16	4	20

=== Republican caucus ===
Alaska Republican legislative district conventions, March 1, 2016
Candidate	Votes	Percentage	Actual delegate count		
Candidate	Votes	Percentage	Bound	Unbound	Total
Ted Cruz	8,369	36.37%	12	0	12
Donald Trump	7,740	33.64%	11	0	11
Marco Rubio	3,488	15.16%	5	0	5
Ben Carson	2,492	10.83%	0	0	0
John Kasich	918	3.99%	0	0	0
Unprojected delegates:			0	0	0
Total:	23,010	100.00%	28	0	28
Source: The Green Papers and Alaska Republican Party

==== Controversy ====
At the Republican National Convention, Alaska's floor votes were all recorded for Donald Trump by the convention secretary, even though the Alaska delegation read their votes according to the results of the caucuses: 12 for Cruz, 11 for Trump and 5 for Rubio. An Alaska delegate challenged the results as recorded. However, RNC chair Reince Priebus defended the actions of the convention secretary, saying that the delegates were bound to Trump.

== General election ==
=== Political landscape in Alaska ===
The state of Alaska has given its electoral votes to the Republican ticket in every election year since 1968 and only once to a Democratic ticket since statehood. However, in 2012, it had the largest swing in favor of the Democratic Party with President Obama only losing by 14 points compared to his 2008 loss by 22 points. This has been explained by the presence of Alaska governor Sarah Palin running on the 2008 Republican ticket (as John McCain's running mate) and not in 2012.

Alaska also has a history of supporting third-party candidates at the presidential level. Alaska was the second-best state for Ross Perot in the 1992 election, awarding him 28% of the vote. Alaska was Nader's strongest state in the 2000 presidential election, giving him 10% in his presidential bid. Alaska was also the third-best state for Libertarian nominee Gary Johnson in the 2012 election, giving him 2.46% of the vote, behind Johnson's home state of New Mexico, and Montana. For this reason, Alaska has been considered to be one of Libertarian party nominee Gary Johnson's strongest states in the 2016 election.

=== Turnout ===
According to the Alaska Division of Election, voter turnout was about 60.77%, 321,271 ballots were cast out of 528,671 voters.

=== Predictions ===
The following are the final 2016 predictions from various organizations for Alaska as of Election Day.

Source	Ranking	As of
Los Angeles Times	Safe R	November 6, 2016
CNN	Safe R	November 8, 2016
Rothenberg Political Report	Safe R	November 7, 2016
Sabato's Crystal Ball	Likely R	November 7, 2016
NBC	Lean R	November 7, 2016
RealClearPolitics	Likely R	November 8, 2016
Fox News	Lean R	November 7, 2016
ABC	Lean R	November 7, 2016

=== Results ===
2016 U.S. presidential election in Alaska
Party	Candidate	Votes	%	±%
Republican	Donald Trump	163,387	51.28%	−3.52%
Democratic	Hillary Clinton	116,454	36.55%	−4.26%
Libertarian	Gary Johnson	18,725	5.88%	+3.42%
Green	Jill Stein	5,735	1.80%	+0.83%
Constitution	Darrell Castle	3,866	1.21%	N/A
Independent	Rocky De La Fuente	1,240	0.39%	N/A
Write-in		9,201	2.89%	N/A
Total votes		318,608	100%	+1.17%

==== By State House district ====
State House District	Donald Trump Republican		Hillary Clinton Democratic		Gary Johnson Libertarian		Jill Stein Green		Darrell Castle Constitution		Rocky De La Fuente Independent		Write-in		Margin		Total
State House District	Votes	%	Votes	%	Votes	%	Votes	%	Votes	%	Votes	%	Votes	%	Votes	%	Total
1	3,180	47.91%	2,573	38.76%	416	6.27%	143	2.15%	73	1.10%	28	0.42%	225	3.39%	607	9.14%	6,638
2	3,188	58.05%	1,585	28.86%	371	6.76%	94	1.71%	58	1.06%	20	0.36%	176	3.20%	1,603	29.19%	5,492
3	5,403	70.97%	1,241	16.30%	518	6.80%	98	1.29%	109	1.43%	23	0.30%	221	2.90%	4,162	54.67%	7,613
4	4,070	42.75%	4,162	43.71%	585	6.14%	237	2.49%	97	1.02%	26	0.27%	344	3.61%	-92	-0.97%	9,521
5	3,683	46.58%	3,187	40.31%	512	6.48%	178	2.25%	71	0.90%	20	0.25%	255	3.23%	496	6.27%	7,906
6	4,929	58.26%	2,536	29.98%	471	5.57%	125	1.48%	137	1.62%	24	0.28%	238	2.81%	2,393	28.29%	8,460
7	5,935	71.56%	1,510	18.21%	431	5.20%	102	1.23%	97	1.17%	27	0.33%	192	2.31%	4,425	53.35%	8,294
8	6,126	75.88%	1,218	15.09%	364	4.51%	88	1.09%	100	1.24%	27	0.33%	150	1.86%	4,908	60.80%	8,073
9	6,100	68.13%	1,843	20.58%	510	5.70%	135	1.51%	111	1.24%	31	0.35%	224	2.50%	4,257	47.54%	8,954
10	6,255	69.19%	1,808	20.00%	493	5.45%	135	1.49%	107	1.18%	23	0.25%	219	2.42%	4,447	49.19%	9,040
11	6,444	66.51%	2,142	22.11%	572	5.90%	124	1.28%	77	0.79%	37	0.38%	293	3.02%	4,302	44.40%	9,689
12	6,629	69.46%	1,928	20.20%	548	5.74%	98	1.03%	76	0.80%	30	0.31%	234	2.45%	4,701	49.26%	9,543
13	4,028	61.66%	1,684	25.78%	480	7.35%	81	1.24%	50	0.77%	16	0.24%	194	2.97%	2,344	35.88%	6,533
14	5,978	57.37%	3,043	29.20%	802	7.70%	103	0.99%	72	0.69%	37	0.36%	385	3.69%	2,935	28.17%	10,420
15	2,525	50.68%	1,828	36.69%	335	6.72%	85	1.71%	49	0.98%	27	0.54%	133	2.67%	697	13.99%	4,982
16	3,203	43.07%	3,294	44.30%	464	6.24%	157	2.11%	67	0.90%	27	0.36%	224	3.01%	-91	-1.22%	7,436
17	2,618	38.57%	3,290	48.47%	419	6.17%	146	2.15%	69	1.02%	35	0.52%	211	3.11%	-672	-9.90%	6,788
18	2,684	36.26%	3,909	52.81%	424	5.73%	136	1.84%	38	0.51%	25	0.34%	186	2.51%	-1,225	-16.55%	7,402
19	1,636	34.14%	2,669	55.70%	190	3.96%	105	2.19%	73	1.52%	28	0.58%	91	1.90%	-1,033	-21.56%	4,792
20	2,187	30.63%	4,151	58.14%	395	5.53%	134	1.88%	50	0.70%	22	0.31%	201	2.82%	-1,964	-27.51%	7,140
21	3,479	40.23%	4,224	48.85%	526	6.08%	134	1.55%	43	0.50%	29	0.34%	212	2.45%	-745	-8.62%	8,647
22	4,203	50.20%	3,270	39.06%	446	5.33%	121	1.45%	47	0.56%	40	0.48%	245	2.93%	933	11.14%	8,372
23	3,246	46.88%	2,894	41.80%	424	6.12%	108	1.56%	69	1.00%	31	0.45%	152	2.20%	352	5.08%	6,924
24	4,709	50.69%	3,578	38.51%	574	6.18%	118	1.27%	58	0.62%	20	0.22%	233	2.51%	1,131	12.17%	9,290
25	3,816	46.95%	3,378	41.57%	521	6.41%	121	1.49%	67	0.82%	31	0.38%	193	2.37%	438	5.39%	8,127
26	4,548	51.07%	3,374	37.89%	536	6.02%	108	1.21%	65	0.73%	26	0.29%	248	2.78%	1,174	13.18%	8,905
27	4,085	46.51%	3,729	42.46%	489	5.57%	139	1.58%	66	0.75%	38	0.43%	237	2.70%	356	4.05%	8,783
28	5,423	47.46%	4,749	41.56%	696	6.09%	143	1.25%	61	0.53%	29	0.25%	326	2.85%	674	5.90%	11,427
29	6,347	67.56%	2,101	22.37%	463	4.93%	136	1.45%	85	0.90%	34	0.36%	228	2.43%	4,246	45.20%	9,394
30	6,194	69.21%	1,816	20.29%	502	5.61%	128	1.43%	87	0.97%	28	0.31%	195	2.18%	4,378	48.92%	8,950
31	5,617	55.17%	3,466	34.04%	500	4.91%	252	2.47%	104	1.02%	32	0.31%	211	2.07%	2,151	21.13%	10,182
32	3,764	50.37%	2,701	36.15%	519	6.95%	177	2.37%	83	1.11%	39	0.52%	189	2.53%	1,063	14.23%	7,472
33	2,732	27.50%	5,978	60.18%	513	5.16%	306	3.08%	99	1.00%	32	0.32%	274	2.76%	-3,246	-32.68%	9,934
34	3,955	41.94%	4,220	44.75%	609	6.46%	229	2.43%	99	1.05%	46	0.49%	273	2.89%	-265	-2.81%	9,431
35	4,105	45.40%	3,749	41.46%	450	4.98%	278	3.07%	148	1.64%	63	0.70%	249	2.75%	356	3.94%	9,042
36	4,460	53.97%	2,693	32.59%	585	7.08%	173	2.09%	110	1.33%	37	0.45%	206	2.49%	1,767	21.38%	'8,264
37	1,938	38.29%	2,421	47.83%	302	5.97%	92	1.82%	118	2.33%	34	0.67%	157	3.10%	-483	-9.54%	5,062
38	1,143	22.43%	2,758	54.13%	273	5.36%	263	5.16%	310	6.08%	36	0.71%	312	6.12%	-1,615	-31.70%	5,095
39	1,405	24.92%	3,142	55.72%	277	4.91%	101	1.79%	301	5.34%	39	0.69%	374	6.63%	-1,737	-30.80%	5,639
40	1,377	29.87%	2,338	50.72%	213	4.62%	93	2.02%	265	5.75%	42	0.91%	282	6.12%	-961	-20.85%	4,610
Overseas	40	11.70%	274	80.12%	7	2.05%	11	3.22%	0	0.00%	1	0.29%	9	2.63%	-234	-68.42%	342

==== Boroughs and census areas that flipped from Democratic to Republican ====
- Prince of Wales–Hyder Census Area (largest city: Craig)

==== Boroughs and census areas that flipped from Republican to Democratic ====
- Haines Borough (largest census-designated place: Haines)

=== By congressional district ===
Due to the state's low population, only one congressional district is allocated. This district, an at-large district because it covers the entire state, is thus equivalent to the statewide election results.

District	Trump	Clinton	Representative
At-large	51.28%	36.55%	Don Young

== Analysis ==
The state is known for strongly supporting third parties, including Libertarian candidate Gary Johnson in 2012; Alaska was his third-strongest state. He ran again as the Libertarian Party's 2016 nominee and appeared on the ballot in Alaska. On the day of the election, he garnered 5.88% of the vote, making Alaska his third-strongest state again after New Mexico and North Dakota. Johnson's performance was the best for a Libertarian since 1980, and the best third party performance since Ralph Nader in 2000. Clinton was able to flip Haines Borough Democratic for the first time since 1992.

Trump became the first Republican since Ronald Reagan in 1984 to win without Kusilvak Census Area, the first since Reagan in 1980 to win without Nome Census Area, Yukon–Koyukuk Census Area, Northwest Arctic Borough, and Dillingham Census Area, the first since Richard Nixon in 1972 to win without North Slope Borough, and the first ever to win without Aleutians West Census Area, Haines Borough, and Lake and Peninsula Borough.

== Electors ==
Alaska had 3 electors in 2016; all of them voted for Donald Trump for president and Mike Pence for vice president.

The electors were:

- Sean R. Parnell
- Jacqueline F. Tupou
- Carolyn B. Leman

== See also ==
- 2016 Democratic Party presidential debates and forums
- 2016 Democratic Party presidential primaries
- 2016 Republican Party presidential debates and forums
- 2016 Republican Party presidential primaries
- United States presidential elections in Alaska
