= 2016 Alaska Democratic presidential caucuses =

- March 26, 2016

Candidate	Bernie Sanders	Hillary Clinton
Home state	Vermont	New York
Delegate count	14	4
Popular vote	8,447	2,146
Percentage	79.6%	20.2%
- Results by state house district Sanders: 60–70% 70–80% 80–90% >90% 100%

The 2016 Alaska Democratic presidential caucuses were held on March 26 in the U.S. state of Alaska as one of the Democratic Party's primaries ahead of the 2016 presidential election.

On the same day, Democratic caucuses were held in Hawaii and in the state of Washington. The Republican Party did not hold any primaries that day; their own Alaska caucuses took place on March 1, 2016.

== Opinion polling ==
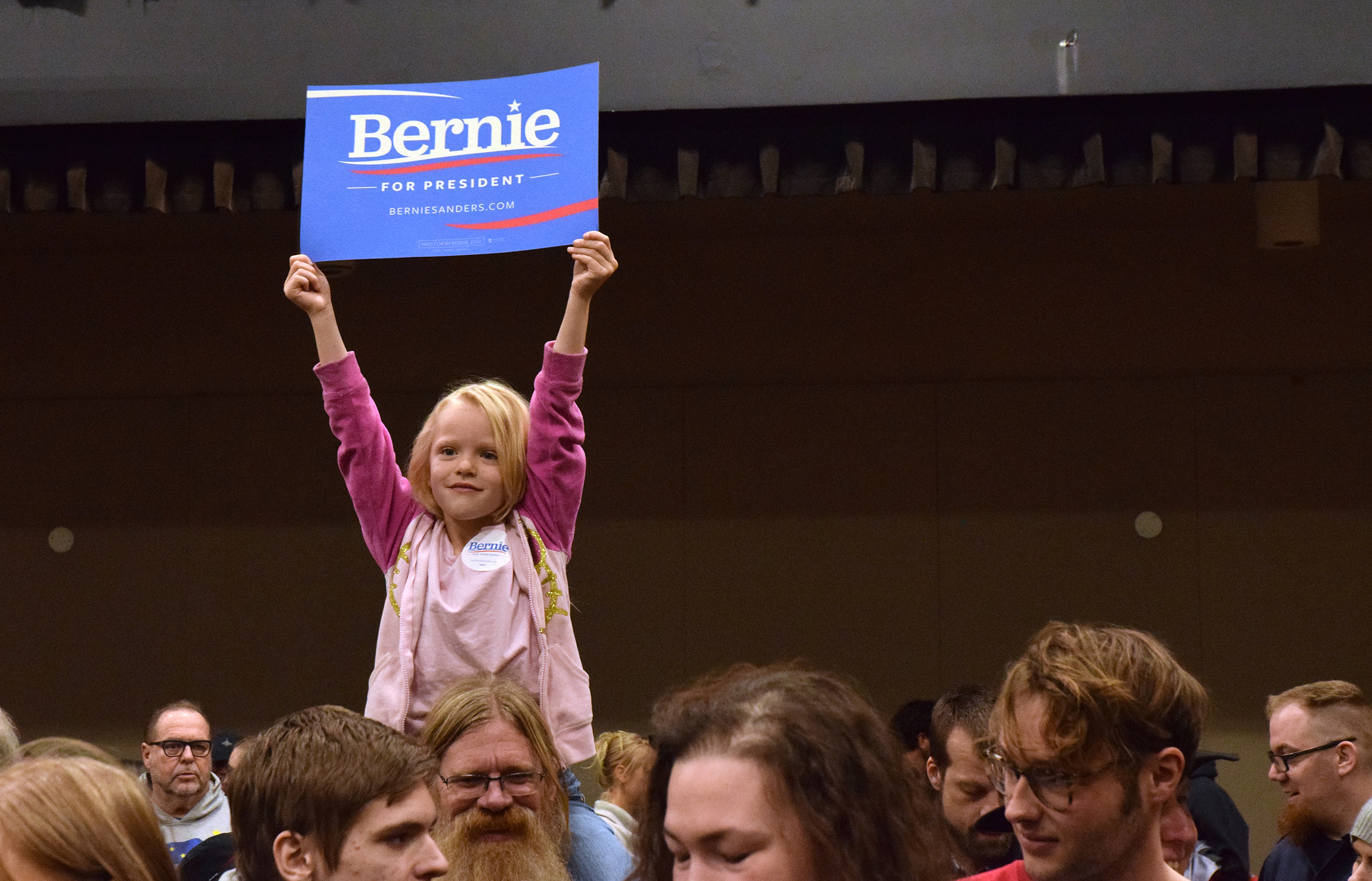
Five-year-old Courtney Skinner holds up a "Bernie Sanders for President" sign while sitting on Tom Skinner's shoulders at the Juneau Democratic Caucus on Saturday, March 26, 2016, in Centennial Hall's Sheffield Ballroom. Sanders won the majority of Juneau's votes and those across Alaska. (James Brooks photo)

Poll source	Date	1st	2nd	Other
Caucus results	March 29, 2016	Bernie Sanders; 79.6%	Hillary Clinton; 20.2%	Other; 0.2%
Alaska Dispatch News/Ivan Moore Research Margin of error: ± ≈3.8% Sample size: 651	Published January 23, 2016	Bernie Sanders; 48%	Hillary Clinton; 34%	Martin O'Malley 6% Undecided 14%

== Results ==
2016 Democratic Party's presidential nominating process in Alaska – Summary of results –
Candidate	Popular vote		District delegates		Estimated delegates		
Candidate	Count	Percentage	Count	Percentage	Pledged	Unpledged	Total
Bernie Sanders	8,447	79.61%	441	81.52%	13	1	14
Hillary Clinton	2,146	20.23%	100	18.48%	3	1	4
Rocky De La Fuente	1	<0.01%					
Uncommitted	16	0.15%			0	2	2
Total	10,610	100%	541	100%	16	4	20

== Analysis ==
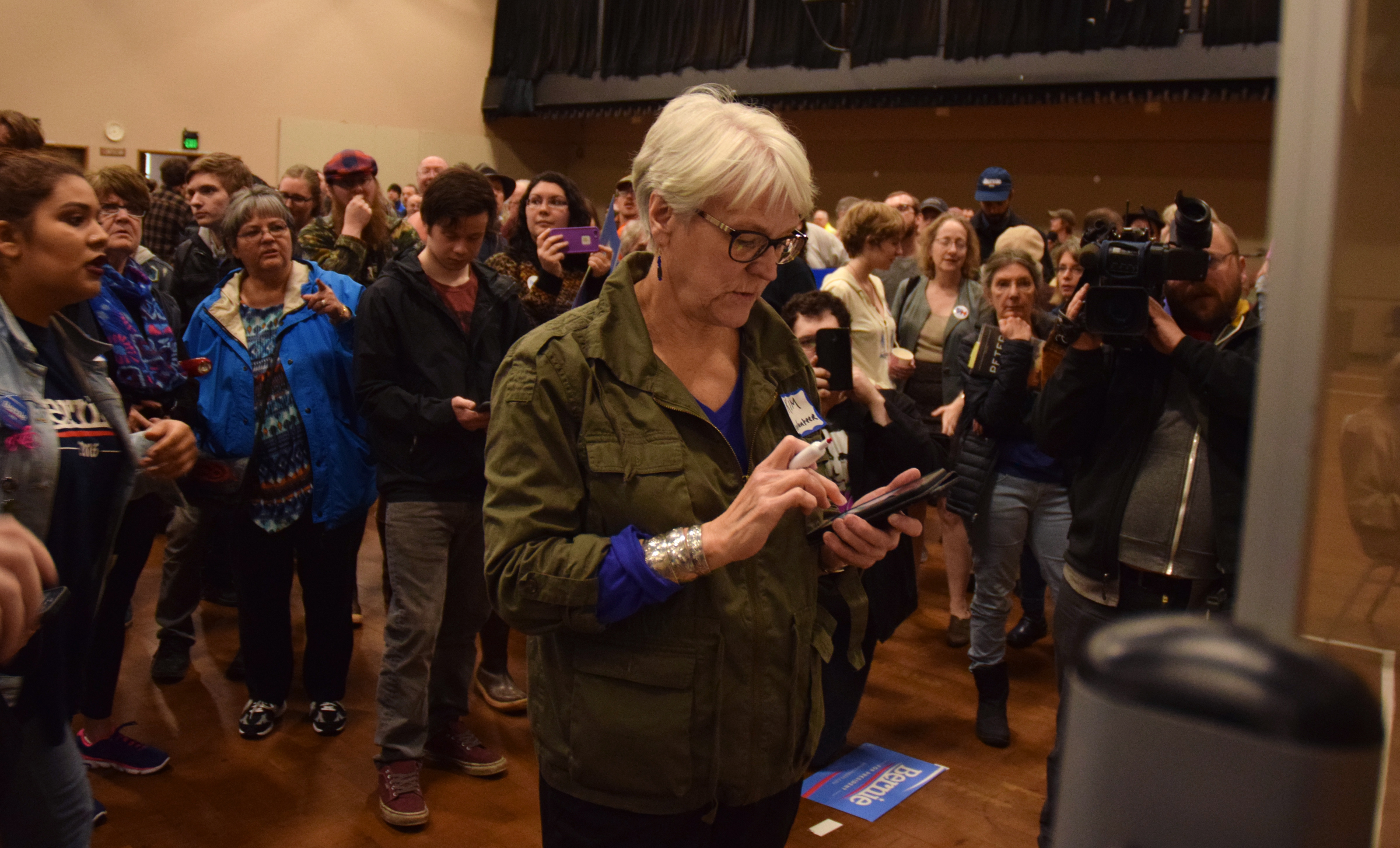
Kim Metcalfe tallies votes at the Juneau Democratic Caucus on Saturday, March 26, 2016, in Centennial Hall's Sheffield Ballroom as voters hold up their cellphones to capture the results. (James Brooks photo)

Alaska gave Sanders his largest win outside of his home state of Vermont. He won 80% of the vote and 82% of the state convention delegates, and carried every borough and census area in the state by landslide margins. He swept Democratic strongholds - including sparsely populated areas in the Bush - as well as GOP strongholds such as Fairbanks and surrounding Interior Alaska, Anchorage on the Kenai Peninsula, and Juneau in the Southeast.

A Sanders win in Alaska was expected, since he generally performed well in caucus states, in majority white electorates, and in the Pacific Northwest. Also, Clinton had lost the state eight years before to Barack Obama, and she did not campaign personally in the state (Sanders did not either, but he sent his wife Jane to campaign for him in Anchorage).

At a rally in Wisconsin on March 26, Sanders told supporters “We knew from day one that politically we were going to have a hard time in the Deep South, but we knew things were going to improve when we headed west.”
