= 2016 Washington elections =

2016 Washington Statewide Executive Office elections
- November 8, 2016

All 9 statewide executive offices
	Majority party	Minority party
Party	Democratic	Republican
Last election	8	1
Seats won	7	2
Seat change	▼1	▲1
Percentage	53.67%	42.42%
Swing	▼4.75%	▲0.89%

A general election was held in the U.S. state of Washington on November 8, 2016. The primary was held on August 2.

At the time of the filing deadline of May 20, 2016, 682 candidates had filed for 345 offices statewide.

== Federal ==
=== President of the United States ===
Washington had 12 electoral votes for the presidential election, which were awarded to Hillary Clinton.

Statewide party caucuses and primaries were held in the spring of 2016 to determine the allocation of state delegates to the respective Democratic and Republican party national conventions. Bernie Sanders won the Democratic caucus in March, defeating Hillary Clinton and taking 73 percent of delegates; Donald Trump won the Republican primary, taking 76 percent of delegates. A non-binding primary for the Democratic party held in May resulted in a victory for Hillary Clinton.

=== United States House of Representatives ===
All 10 of Washington's seats in the United States House of Representatives were up for re-election. All but one of the incumbents ran for re-election, the exception being Jim McDermott (D) of the 7th district. McDermott's seat was won by Pramila Jayapal (D). The remaining seats were retained by the incumbents.

=== United States Senate ===
Incumbent Democratic senior Senator Patty Murray ran for re-election to a fifth term in office, defeating Republican challenger Chris Vance by 18 points.

United States Senate election in Washington, 2016
Primary election
Party	Candidate	Votes	%
Democratic	Patty Murray (incumbent)	745,421	53.8
Republican	Chris Vance	381,004	27.5
Republican	Eric John Makus	57,825	4.2
Democratic	Phil Cornell	46,460	3.4
Republican	Scott Nazarino	41,542	3.0
Libertarian	Mike Luke	20,988	1.5
Democratic	Mohammad Said	13,362	1.0
Independent	Donna Rae Lands	11,472	0.8
Independent	Ted Cummings	11,028	0.8
Independent	Sam Wright	10,751	0.8
Republican	Uncle Mover	8,569	0.6
Independent	Jeremy Teuton	7,991	0.6
Democratic	Thor Amundson	7,906	0.6
Independent	Chuck Jackson	6,318	0.5
Independent	Pano Churchill	5,150	0.4
Independent	Zach Haller	5,092	0.4
Independent	Alex Tsimerman	4,117	0.3
Total votes		1,384,996	100.0
General election
Democratic	Patty Murray (incumbent)	1,913,979	59.0
Republican	Chris Vance	1,329,338	41.0
Total votes		3,243,317	100.0
Democratic hold			

== Statewide ==
=== Governor ===
Incumbent Governor Jay Inslee was re-elected to his second term over Port of Seattle Commissioner Bill Bryant.

Washington gubernatorial election, 2016
Primary election
Party	Candidate	Votes	%
Democratic	Jay Inslee (incumbent)	687,412	49.3
Republican	Bill Bryant	534,519	38.3
Republican	Bill Hirt	48,382	3.5
Democratic	Patrick O'Rourke	40,572	2.9
Independent	Steve Rubenstein	22,582	1.6
Democratic	James Robert Deal	14,623	1.1
Democratic	Johnathan Dodds	14,152	1.0
Republican	Goodspaceguy	13,191	0.9
Socialist Workers	Mary Martin	10,374	0.7
Independent	David Blomstrom	4,512	0.3
Independent	Christian Joubert	4,103	0.3
Total votes		1,394,422	100.0
General election
Democratic	Jay Inslee (incumbent)	1,760,520	54.2
Republican	Bill Bryant	1,476,346	45.5
Write-in		8,416	0.3
Total votes		3,245,282	100.0
Democratic hold			

=== Lieutenant governor ===
Incumbent lieutenant governor Brad Owen, first elected to the office in 1996, announced that he would not seek a sixth term.

Democratic state Senator Cyrus Habib defeated Republican radio host Marty McClendon by nine points to succeed Owen.

Washington lieutenant gubernatorial election, 2016
Primary election
Party	Candidate	Votes	%
Democratic	Cyrus Habib	294,641	22.3
Republican	Marty McClendon	253,714	19.2
Democratic	Karen Fraser	207,271	15.7
Democratic	Steve Hobbs	202,427	15.3
Republican	Phillip Yin	141,680	10.7
Democratic	Karen Wallace	59,175	4.5
Republican	Javier Figueroa	56,214	4.2
Republican	Bill Penor	52,986	4.0
Libertarian	Paul Addis	26,304	2.0
Independent	Daniel Davies	16,491	1.2
Independent	Mark Greene	12,692	1.0
Total votes		1,323,595	100.0
General election
Democratic	Cyrus Habib	1,698,297	54.4
Republican	Marty McClendon	1,424,277	45.6
Total votes		3,122,574	100.0
Democratic hold			

=== Attorney general ===
Incumbent attorney general Bob Ferguson, elected in 2012 as a Democrat, sought reelection, opposed by Joshua B. Trumbull, who ran as a Libertarian.

Washington Attorney General election, 2016
Primary election
Party	Candidate	Votes	%
Democratic	Bob Ferguson (incumbent)	906,493	72.6
Libertarian	Joshua Trumbull	341,932	27.4
Total votes		1,248,425	100.0
General election
Democratic	Bob Ferguson (incumbent)	2,000,804	67.1
Libertarian	Joshua Trumbull	979,105	32.9
Total votes		2,979,909	100.0
Democratic hold			

=== Secretary of State ===
Incumbent Secretary of State Kim Wyman, elected in 2012 as the only Republican to hold a statewide office on the West Coast, sought reelection. Former Seattle City Councilmember Tina Podlodowski announced her bid in January 2016, seeking to become the first Democrat to hold the office since 1965. Wyman retained her seat with 55% of the vote.

Washington Secretary of State election, 2016
Primary election
Party	Candidate	Votes	%
Republican	Kim Wyman (incumbent)	645,614	47.9
Democratic	Tina Podlodowski	621,732	46.1
Libertarian	Tim Turner	80,570	6.0
Total votes		1,347,916	100.0
General election
Republican	Kim Wyman (incumbent)	1,713,004	54.7
Democratic	Tina Podlodowski	1,416,299	45.3
Total votes		3,129,303	100.0
Republican hold			

=== State Auditor ===
Incumbent state auditor Troy Kelley, elected as a Democrat in 2012, did not file to run for a second term.

Democratic Pierce County Executive Pat McCarthy defeated Republican state Senator Mark Miloscia to succeed Kelley.

Washington State Auditor election, 2016
Primary election
Party	Candidate	Votes	%
Republican	Mark Miloscia	481,910	36.7
Democratic	Pat McCarthy	381,828	29.1
Democratic	Jeff Sprung	314,290	23.9
Independent	Mark Wilson	96,972	7.4
Independent	David Golden	37,727	2.9
Total votes		1,312,727	100.0
General election
Democratic	Pat McCarthy	1,597,011	52.3
Republican	Mark Miloscia	1,455,771	47.7
Total votes		3,052,782	100.0
Democratic hold			

=== State Treasurer ===
Incumbent James McIntire announced on December 16, 2015, that he would not seek a third term as Washington State Treasurer. Benton County Treasurer Duane Davidson was elected to succeed him.

Washington State Treasurer election, 2016
Primary election
Party	Candidate	Votes	%
Republican	Duane Davidson	322,374	25.1
Republican	Michael Waite	299,766	23.3
Democratic	Marko Liias	261,633	20.4
Democratic	John Paul Comerford	230,904	18.0
Democratic	Alec Fisken	170,117	13.2
Total votes		1,284,794	100.0
General election
Republican	Duane Davidson	1,576,580	58.1
Republican	Michael Waite	1,134,843	41.9
Total votes		2,711,423	100.0
Republican gain from Democratic			

=== Public Lands Commissioner ===
Incumbent Public Lands Commissioner Peter J. Goldmark, elected in 2008 and reelected in 2012, announced his intention to not seek a third term in office.

Democrat Hilary Franz was elected, defeating Republican Steve McLaughlin with 53% of the vote.

Washington Public Lands Commissioner election, 2016
Primary election
Party	Candidate	Votes	%
Republican	Steve McLaughlin	494,416	37.9
Democratic	Hilary Franz	297,074	22.8
Democratic	Dave Upthegrove	183,976	14.1
Democratic	Mary Verner	159,564	12.2
Libertarian	Steven Nielson	63,056	4.8
Democratic	Karen Porterfield	61,710	4.7
Democratic	John Stillings	43,129	3.3
Total votes		1,302,925	100.0
General election
Democratic	Hilary Franz	1,630,369	53.2
Republican	Steve McLaughlin	1,436,817	46.8
Total votes		3,067,186	100.0
Democratic hold			

=== Superintendent of Public Instruction ===
Incumbent Randy Dorn declined to run for a third term as Superintendent of Public Instruction. Nine candidates ran in the nonpartisan election. Erin Jones and Chris Reykdal finished as top two and advanced to the general election. In a close race, Reykdal edged out Jones by one point. Jones conceded the election on November 22.

Washington Superintendent of Public Instruction election, 2016
Primary election
Party	Candidate	Votes	%
Nonpartisan	Erin Jones	295,330	25.8
Nonpartisan	Chris Reykdal	240,194	21.0
Nonpartisan	Ron Higgins	190,886	16.7
Nonpartisan	Robin Fleming	154,991	13.5
Nonpartisan	David Spring	97,702	8.5
Nonpartisan	John Patterson Blair	64,064	5.6
Nonpartisan	KumRoon Maksirisombat	43,491	3.8
Nonpartisan	Al Runte	37,386	3.3
Nonpartisan	Grazyna Prouty	22,265	1.9
Total votes		1,146,309	100.0
General election
Nonpartisan	Chris Reykdal	1,337,547	50.5
Nonpartisan	Erin Jones	1,309,896	49.5
Total votes		2,647,443	100.0
Democratic hold			

=== Insurance Commissioner ===
Mike Kreidler was reelected to his fifth term.

Washington Insurance Commissioner election, 2016
Primary election
Party	Candidate	Votes	%
Democratic	Mike Kreidler (incumbent)	772,569	58.4
Republican	Richard Schrock	450,830	34.1
Libertarian	Justin Murta	99,181	7.5
Total votes		1,322,580	100.0
General election
Democratic	Mike Kreidler (incumbent)	1,763,134	58.3
Republican	Richard Schrock	1,258,827	41.7
Total votes		3,021,961	100.0
Democratic hold			

== Legislative ==
=== State Senate ===
Twenty-five of the forty-nine seats in the Washington State Senate were up for election. Republicans held a narrow majority in the Senate, taking 26 seats compared to 23 for the Democrats. Seven incumbent senators retired, creating vacancies that had the potential to swing the split of party votes. A Democrat defeated the Republican incumbent in District 41, leaving Republicans with a one-seat majority.

=== State House of Representatives ===
All 98 seats in the Washington House of Representatives were up for election. The outgoing House had a narrow Democratic majority, with 50 seats compared to the Republicans' 48. Both parties picked up seats from the other party, resulting in the same overall composition.

== Ballot measures ==
- Washington Initiative 732 proposed a revenue-neutral carbon tax to fight global warming. The measure would have imposed a fee on carbon dioxide emissions within the state, decreased the state's sales tax and business tax, and expanded the state's version of the earned income tax credit. It was rejected by voters on November 8.
- Voters approved a minimum wage increase by a 57% vote. The initiative calls for increasing the state's minimum wage to $13.50 an hour by 2020 from $9.47.
- Voters approved Sound Transit 3, building 62 Miles of Light Rail.
- Voters approved a firearms access ballot measure; the initiative calls for allowing courts to issue “extreme risk protection orders” to temporarily prevent people from owning or obtaining firearms if there is a risk of harm to themselves or others.
- Voters repealed a dental insurance tax.
- Voters repealed Advisory Vote 15 for alternative fuel vehicles.
- Voters rejected a campaign finance initiative, Initiative 1464.
- Voters approved a measure to increase fines for fraud.
- Voters voted against an effort to create a carbon emissions tax.
- Voters approved an initiative to denounce Citizen's United.
- Voters approved a redistricting deadline.

Initiative 1433 Results by county Yes: 60–70%; 50–60%; No: 60–70%; 50–60%

Initiative 1491 Results by county Yes: 80–90%; 70–80%; 60–70%; 50–60%; No: 50–60%

Advisory Vote 14 Results by county No: 80–90%; 70–80%; 60–70%; 50–60%

Advisory Vote 15 Results by county No: 80–90%; 70–80%; 60–70%; 50–60%; Yes: 50–60%

Initiative 1464 Results by county No: 70–80%; 60–70%; 50–60%; Yes: 50–60%

Initiative 1501 Results by county Yes: 70–80%; 60–70%; 50–60%

Initiative 732 Results by county No: 80–90%; 70–80%; 60–70%; 50–60%; Yes: 50–60%

Initiative 735 Results by county Yes: 70–80%; 60–70%; 50–60%; No: 50–60%

Initiative 8210 Results by county Yes: 80–90%; 70–80%; 60–70%

== Local elections ==
- John Blom defeated Tanisha L. Harris for Clark City Council District 3.
- Eileen Quiring defeated Roman Battan for Clark City Council District 4.
- Nancy Barnes defeated Mike Lyons for Public Utility District No. 1 of Clark County Commissioner in District No. 2.
- City of Vancouver Proposition No. 1 was approved.
- City of Woodland Transportation Benefit District Proposition No. 1 was approved.
- Battle Ground School District No. 119 Proposition No. 1 was approved.

== See also ==
- Elections in Washington (state)
