= 2016 Washington Republican presidential primary =

- May 24, 2016

44 delegates to the Republican National Convention (41 pledged, 3 unpledged)
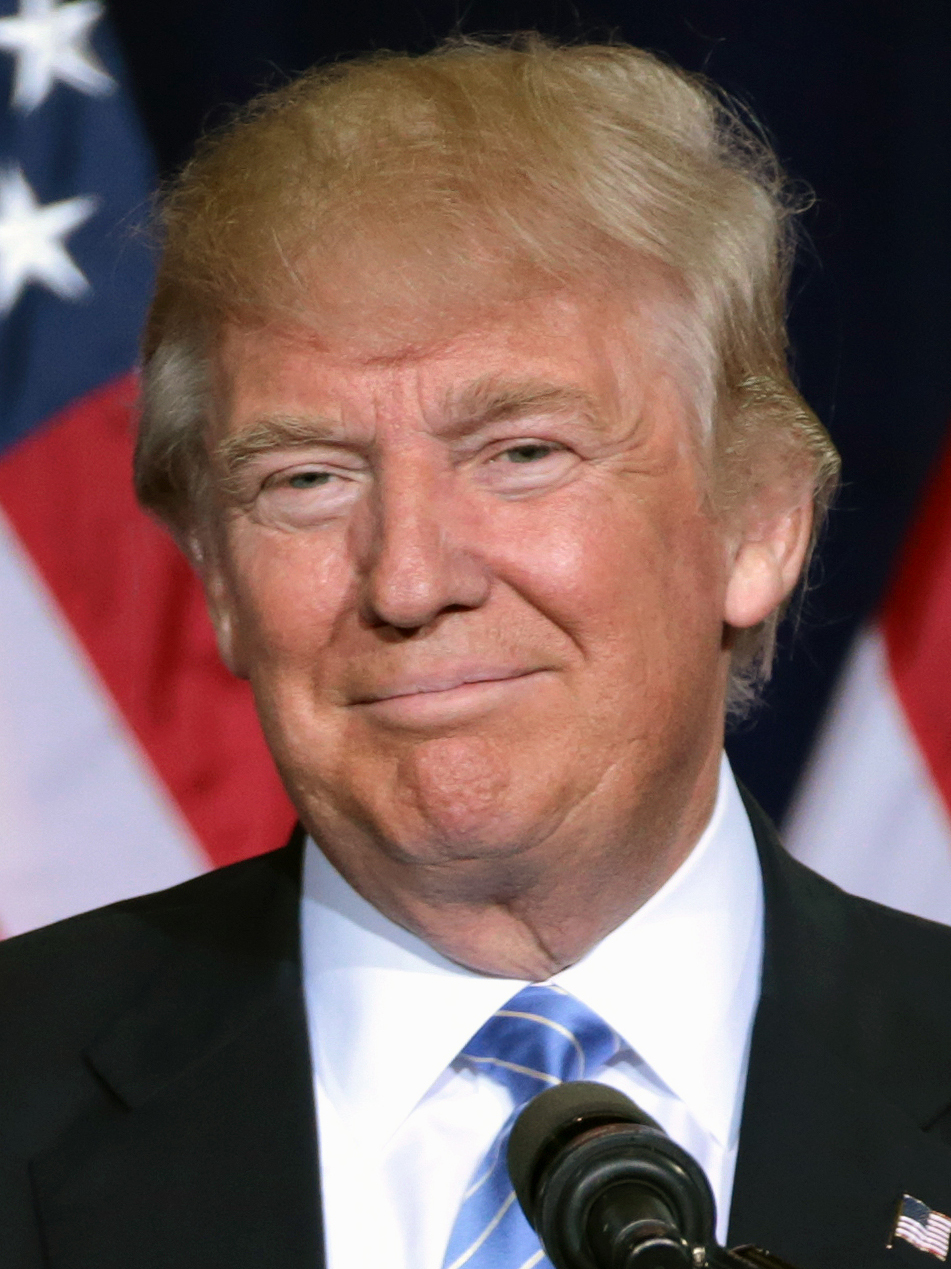

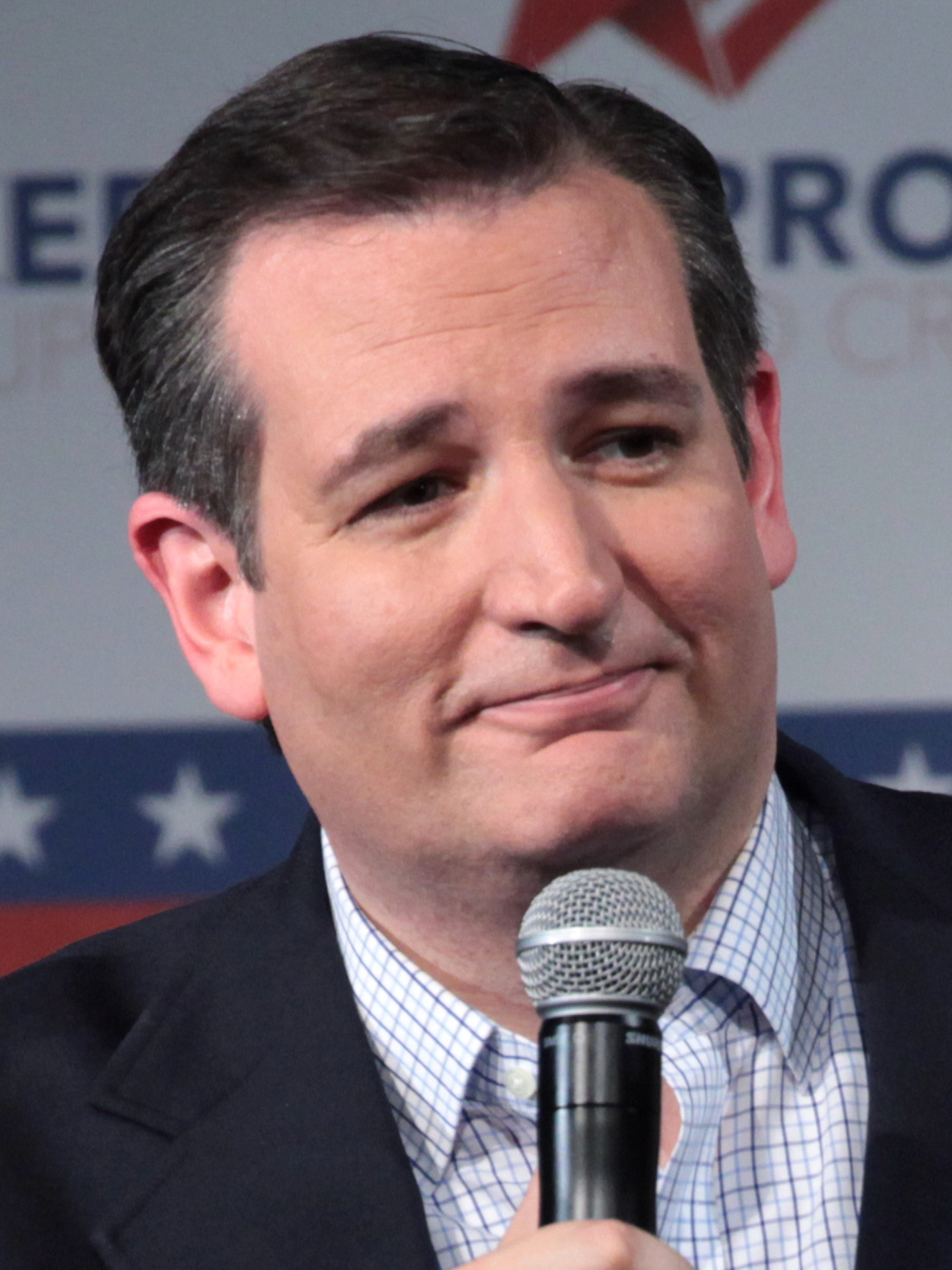

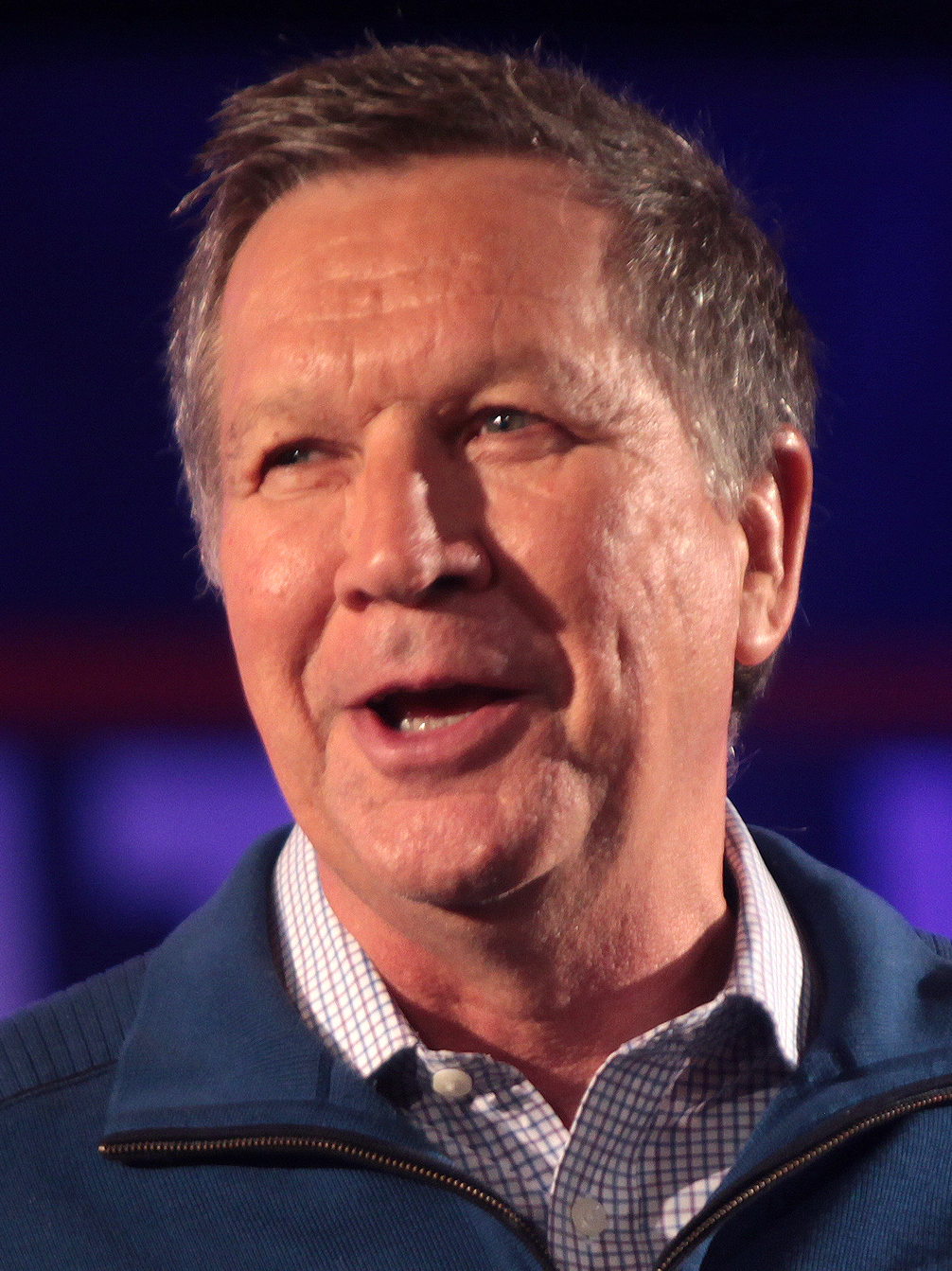
Candidate	Donald Trump	Ted Cruz (withdrawn)	John Kasich (withdrawn)
Home state	New York	Texas	Ohio
Delegate count	41	0	0
Popular vote	455,023	65,172	58,954
Percentage	75.46%	10.81%	9.78%

Trump
60–70%
70–80%
80–90%

The 2016 Washington Republican presidential primary was held on May 24 in the U.S. state of Washington as one of the Republican Party's primaries ahead of the 2016 presidential election. The only candidate on the ballot who had not withdrawn was Donald Trump.

The Democratic Party held their Washington caucuses on March 26, and a non-binding primary in Washington on the same day as the Republican primary. No other primaries were scheduled for that day. Following Trump's victory in Washington and a surge in his support from unbound North Dakota delegates, the Associated Press (on May 26) announced that Trump had passed the threshold of 1,237 delegates required to guarantee his nomination.

== List of delegates ==
The Washington Republican State Convention was held May 19–21, 2016 in Pasco, WA. Delegates to the Republican National Convention were elected from among the approximately 3,000 delegates and alternates who had been elected to the Washington Republican State Convention.

Washington state delegates to the 2016 Republican National Convention (RNC)
Delegate	WA Congressional District
Janna Anderson	7th Congressional District
Maria Apodaca	6th Congressional District
David Barnes	5th Congressional District
Kenneth Barton	8th Congressional District
Michele Beckmann	5th Congressional District
Gina Blanchard-Reed	10th Congressional District
Richard Brantley	10th Congressional District
Bill Bruch	2nd Congressional District
Nancy C. Williams	6th Congressional District
Anthony Ceres	7th Congressional District
Paul Clark	9th Congressional District
Jeanne Congdon	7th Congressional District
Selena Coppa	10th Congressional District
Charlie Crabtree	1st Congressional District
Amy Davis	9th Congressional District
Dayna Dent	4th Congressional District
Allan Dunham	3rd Congressional District
Kathleen Estabrook	1st Congressional District
Lisa Evans	3rd Congressional District
Olga Farnum	1st Congressional District
Judah Finney	2nd Congressional District
Kerry French	10th Congressional District
Ingrid Fuhriman	9th Congressional District
Kathleen Hanzell	9th Congressional District
Kimberly Heath	4th Congressional District
Jeffrey Helsdon	6th Congressional District
Brenda High	4th Congressional District
Vadim Kasko	2nd Congressional District
Chris Leiter	8th Congressional District
Shaun Lewis	8th Congressional District
Kelly Lotze	5th Congressional District
Mark Marr	8th Congressional District
Joel Mattila	3rd Congressional District
Michael McCrary	4th Congressional District
Manette Merrill	2nd Congressional District
Martin Metz	9th Congressional District
Olga Miller	3rd Congressional District
Eric Minor	6th Congressional District
Bill Orsborn	1st Congressional District
Marc Perez	10th Congressional District
Dan Perrier	3rd Congressional District
Norma Peters	3rd Congressional District
Grant Peterson	5th Congressional District
Jack Pickett	4th Congressional District
Eric Rohrbach	1st Congressional District
Richard Sanders	7th Congressional District
Virginia Schloredt	2nd Congressional District
Joseph Swart	5th Congressional District
Pat Tarzwell	6th Congressional District
Luke Thompson	1st Congressional District
Lisa Thwing	7th Congressional District
Gregory Tozer	5th Congressional District
Thomas Turnure	7th Congressional District
John Vasko	8th Congressional District
Diane Wagner	8th Congressional District
Dennis Walters	4th Congressional District
Tom Watson	10th Congressional District
Philip Wilson	6th Congressional District
Natalie Zook	2nd Congressional District

== Opinion polling ==
List of polls
Main article: United States presidential election in Washington (state), 2016

Winner: Donald Trump
Primary date: May 24, 2016

Poll source	Date	1st	2nd	3rd	Other
Primary results	May 10, 2016	Donald Trump; 75.82%	Ted Cruz; 10.48%	John Kasich; 9.81%	Ben Carson 3.89%
Townhall/Gravis Insights Margin of error: ± 4% Sample size: 523	May 18–19, 2015	Rand Paul; 13.2%	Scott Walker; 12.4%	Jeb Bush; 11.5%	Marco Rubio 11.3%, Ben Carson 7.6%, Chris Christie 6%, Ted Cruz 5%, Mike Huckabee 5%, Carly Fiorina 3%, Rick Santorum 2%, Unsure 23%
Public Policy Polling Margin of error: ± 5.1% Sample size: 372	May 14–17, 2015	Scott Walker; 18%	Marco Rubio; 15%	Mike Huckabee; 13%	Ted Cruz 11%, Jeb Bush 10%, Ben Carson 10%, Chris Christie 6%, Rand Paul 5%, Rick Perry 3%, Someone else/Not sure 7%

== Results ==
Washington Republican primary, May 24, 2016
Candidate	Votes	Percentage	Actual delegate count		
Candidate	Votes	Percentage	Bound	Unbound	Total
Donald Trump	455,023	75.46%	41	0	41
Ted Cruz (withdrawn)	65,172	10.81%	0	0	0
John Kasich (withdrawn)	58,954	9.78%	0	0	0
Ben Carson (withdrawn)	23,849	3.96%	0	0	0
Uncommitted			3	0	3
Unprojected delegates:			0	0	0
Total:	602,998	100.00%	44	0	44
Source: The Green Papers

== See also ==
- 2016 Washington Democratic presidential caucuses
