= 2016 Washington Democratic presidential caucuses =

- March 26, 2016

Candidate	Bernie Sanders	Hillary Clinton
Home state	Vermont	New York
Delegate count	74	27
Percentage	72.72%	27.10%
County results
Sanders
60–70%
70–80%
80–90%

The 2016 Washington Democratic presidential caucuses were held on March 26, 2016, in the U.S. state of Washington as one of the Democratic Party's primaries ahead of the 2016 presidential election.

On the same day, Democratic caucuses were held in Alaska and Hawaii. While the Republican primary was later held on May 24, 2016.

Sanders overwhelmingly won the March 26 caucus which had about 230,000 participants, winning 72.7% of the state's legislative district delegates to Clinton's 27.1%, giving Sanders a net gain of 47 pledged delegates.

Later, the state also held a non-binding primary vote on May 24, in which Clinton received about 52% of the vote – although this has no actual bearing on the delegate count for the nomination.

== Opinion polling ==
Poll source	Date	1st	2nd	3rd	Other
Caucus results	March 29, 2016	Bernie Sanders; 72.72%	Hillary Clinton; 27.10%		Other; 0.18%
Gravis Marketing Margin of error: ± 6% Sample size: 256	May 18–19, 2015	Hillary Clinton; 35%	Elizabeth Warren; 26%	Bernie Sanders; 19%	Joe Biden 4%, Martin O'Malley 3%, Jim Webb 1%, Unsure 12%
Gravis Marketing Margin of error: ± 6% Sample size: 256	May 18–19, 2015	Hillary Clinton; 45%	Bernie Sanders; 36%	Lincoln Chafee; 2%	Bill De Blasio 2%, Martin O'Malley 2%, Jim Webb 1%, Unsure 12%
Public Policy Polling Margin of error: ± 5% Sample size: 391	May 14–17, 2015	Hillary Clinton; 57%	Bernie Sanders; 24%	Martin O'Malley; 4%	Jim Webb 2%, Lincoln Chafee 1%, Not sure 12%

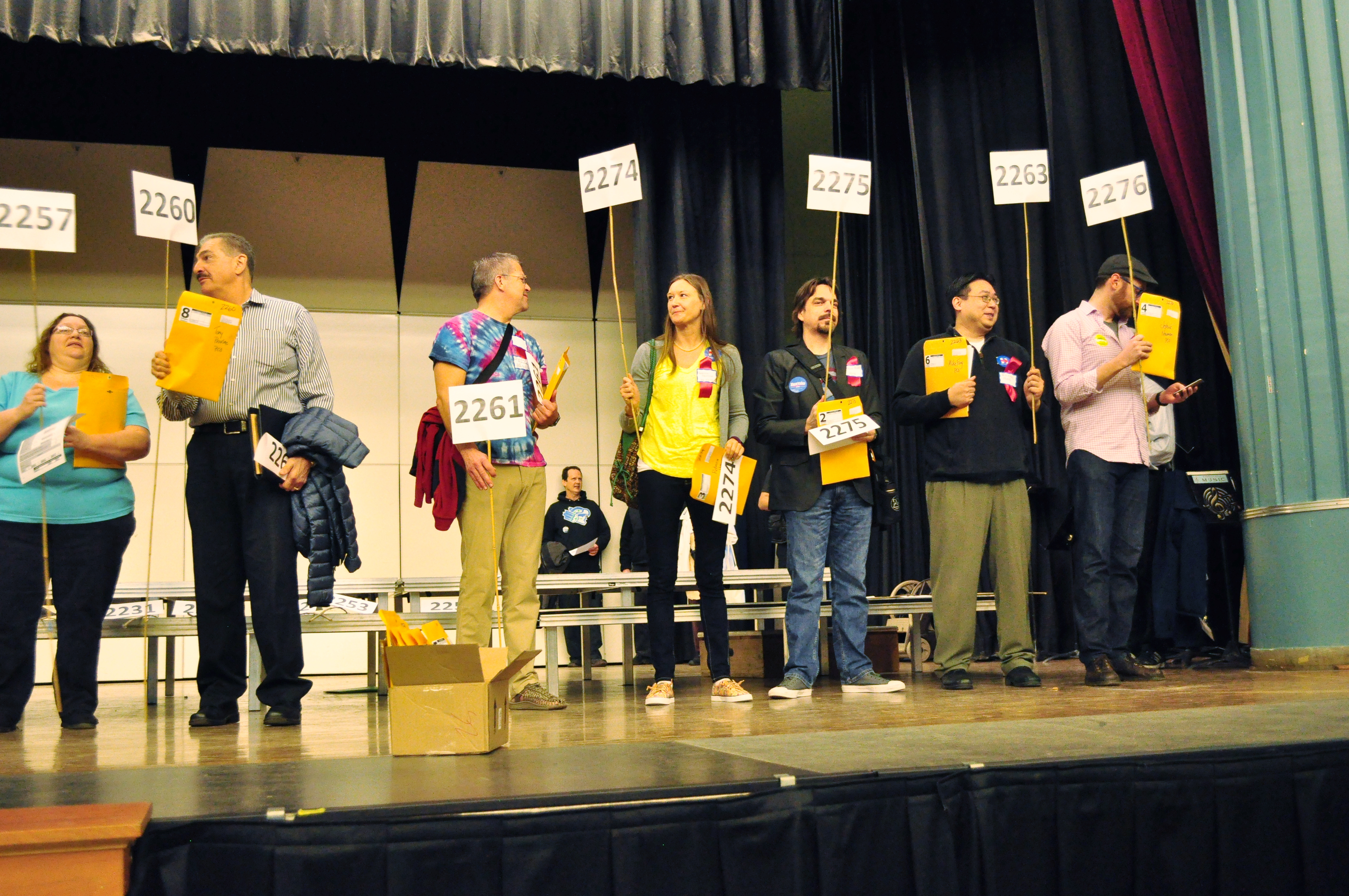
2016 Washington State Democratic precinct caucuses, Eckstein Middle School, Seattle, Washington, March 26, 2016. Precinct Committee Officers and other convenors.

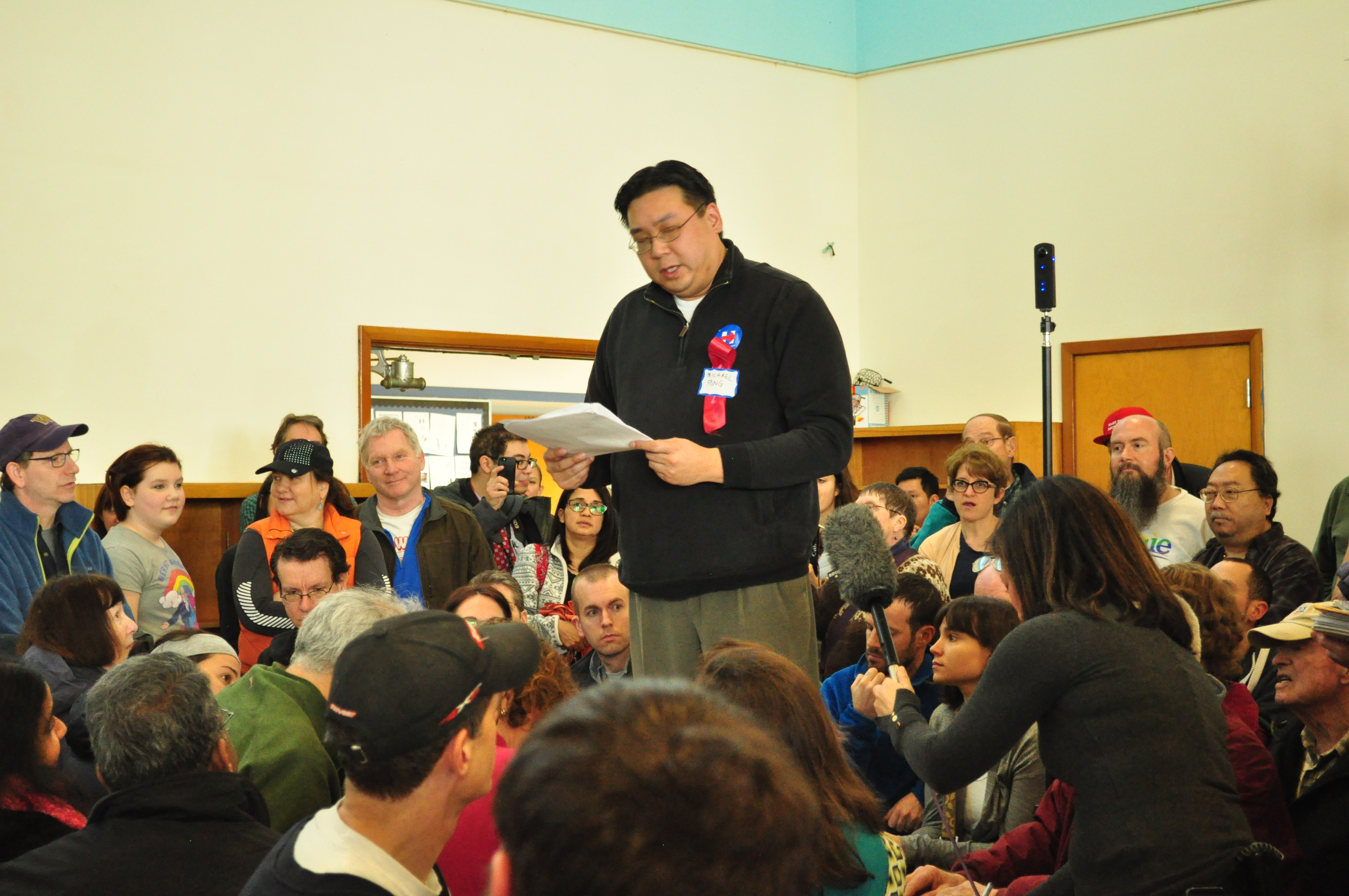
2016 Washington State Democratic precinct caucuses, Eckstein Middle School, Seattle, Washington, March 26, 2016.

== Results ==
Washington Democratic caucuses, March 26, 2016
Candidate	District delegates		Estimated delegates		
Candidate	Count	Percentage	Pledged	Unpledged	Total
Bernie Sanders	19,159	72.72%	74	0	74
Hillary Clinton	7,140	27.10%	27	10	37
Others					
Uncommitted	46	0.18%	0	7	7
Total	26,345	100%	101	17	118

Washington Democratic primary, May 24, 2016
Candidate	Popular vote		Estimated delegates		
Candidate	Count	Percentage	Pledged	Unpledged	Total
Hillary Clinton	420,461	52.38%	27	10	37
Bernie Sanders	382,293	47.62%	74	0	74
Others					
Uncommitted					
Total	802,754	100.00%	101	17	118
Source: Washington Secretary of State - Official Primary Results

== Analysis ==
Sanders scored a landslide victory in the Washington caucus. His victory did not come as a huge surprise, since Seattle as a city had donated the most money per capita to the Bernie Sanders for President Campaign, and Washington state (particularly Seattle) has a history of electing more left-leaning politicians including other self-proclaimed socialists to office. Sanders won all counties in the state on the day of the caucus.

Clinton had lost the Washington caucus eight years earlier to Barack Obama.

At a rally in Wisconsin on March 26, Sanders told supporters "We knew from day one that politically we were going to have a hard time in the Deep South, but we knew things were going to improve when we headed west." Clinton won the Washington Democratic Primary, but lost the caucus. The same was true with Nebraska. She won the Primary and lost the caucus. In both states, despite the primary being non-binding it had significantly higher turnout than the caucuses, fueling criticism that caucuses are undemocratic and a form of voter suppression. For the 2020 nominating process, Washington and Nebraska both replaced their caucuses with binding primaries to allocate the states' delegates.

== See also ==
- 2016 Washington Republican presidential primary
