= 2018 Washington Initiative 1631 =

Initiative 1631
- Washington Carbon Emissions Fee and Revenue Allocation Initiative

Results
Choice	Votes	%
Yes	1,340,725	43.44%
No	1,745,703	56.56%
Total votes	3,086,428	100.00%

Yes:
50–60%
60–70%
No:
50–60%
60–70%
70–80%
80–90%

The Washington Carbon Emissions Fee and Revenue Allocation Initiative, also known as Initiative 1631 or the Protect Washington Act was a ballot initiative that appeared on ballots in the State of Washington in the November 2018 election. The initiative proposed to reduce pollution by levying a fee on greenhouse gas emissions generated within the state of Washington, and using that revenue to support air quality and energy projects, as well as water quality and forest health initiatives. The measure failed with 56.3% of voters rejecting it. As of 2018, more had been spent in campaigning for and against the initiative than on any other ballot measure in Washington history.

== Ballot title ==
The ballot title was as follows:

Initiative Measure No. 1631 concerns pollution.

This measure would charge pollution fees on sources of greenhouse gas pollutants and use the revenue to reduce pollution, promote clean energy, and address climate impacts, under oversight of a public board.

Should this measure be enacted into law?

== Measure design ==
The measure stated that, beginning on January 1, 2020, a fee of $15 would be enacted on each metric ton of carbon emitted in the state of Washington. The fee would increase by $2 every year until the state's greenhouse gas emissions target for 2035 is met, and the state's emissions target for 2050 is on track to be met. These goals had previously been set by the Washington State Legislature, which passed a law in 2008 that required the state to reduce its emissions to 1990 levels by 2020, 25% below 1990 levels by 2035, and 80% below 1990 levels by 2050. As of 2018, the state is not on track to achieve those goals.

== Background ==
Environmental advocates in Washington had previously attempted to pass carbon pricing measures. Washington Initiative 732, a "tax swap" proposal to levy a tax on carbon emissions and simultaneously reduce the state's sales tax, had appeared on the ballot in the 2016 election, but failed to pass. Initiative 1631 differed in that it proposed to use revenue from carbon fees to invest in projects to reduce pollution. These include projects related to transportation, energy efficiency, carbon sequestrations in farms and forests, and clean energy. The initiative also proposed to invest over $250 million in climate adaptation in the areas of forestry and water conservation. The particular projects funded would be determined by a board appointed by the Governor of Washington that would be directed to invest 70% of the revenue in clean energy.

== Support ==
The initiative was drafted by a broad coalition of labor, faith, social justice, health, tribal, and environmental justice groups, such as Front and Centered, a coalition of people of color and low-income people advocating for a just transition. It was also supported by Carbon Washington, the organization that had put Initiative 732 on the ballot. Other organizations that supported the initiative included Stand.earth, The Nature Conservancy, and local chapters of 350.org and the Sierra Club. Elected officials who supported this initiative included United States Representative Pramila Jayapal and Washington Governor Jay Inslee.

== Opposition ==
The "No on 1631" campaign was sponsored by the Western States Petroleum Association. The American Fuel and Petrochemical Manufacturers and its members spent over $30 million to defeat the measure. Companies that funded the campaign against the initiative included Cascade Natural Gas, BP, Royal Dutch Shell, Chevron, and Phillips 66. Atmospheric sciences professor Cliff Mass opposed the initiative.

Others opposed the measure because section 9(c) specifically exempted "Fossil fuels directly or eventually supplied to a light and power business for purposes of generating electricity" from the carbon tax. This meant that coal, gas, and diesel power plants would not directly be responsible for paying the carbon tax. However the majority of electricity generation in Washington state is derived from renewable sources. A 2017 report by The Washington Post indicated that 68% of electricity generated in Washington state comes from hydropower and 7% is from wind turbines. The same analysis further indicated that only 4% of Washington's energy comes from burning coal, all of which is generated by the Centralia Power Plant. This plant will begin phasing out its two coal boilers beginning in the year 2020 and transition completely to natural gas by the year 2025. Natural gas currently accounts for only 10% of Washington's energy generation, according to the Washington Post analysis.

Ultimately, the initiative did not pass during the 2018 November election.

== Results ==
Initiative 1631 failed with 57% voting against.

2018 Washington Initiative 1631
Choice	Votes	%
For	1,340,725	43.44
Against	1,745,703	56.56
Total	3,086,428	100.00
Source: Washington Secretary of State

=== By county ===
County results
County	No		Yes		Margin		Total votes
County	#	%	#	%	#	%	Total votes
Adams	3,362	80.12%	834	19.88%	2,528	60.25%	4,196
Asotin	6,795	74.56%	2,318	25.44%	4,477	49.13%	9,113
Benton	56,383	75.01%	18,788	24.99%	37,595	50.01%	75,171
Chelan	22,538	67.11%	11,048	32.89%	11,490	34.21%	33,586
Clallam	24,470	61.79%	15,135	38.21%	9,335	23.57%	39,605
Clark	114,643	59.22%	78,935	40.78%	35,708	18.45%	193,578
Columbia	1,771	80.03%	442	19.97%	1,329	60.05%	2,213
Cowlitz	30,632	69.75%	13,285	30.25%	17,347	39.50%	43,917
Douglas	11,372	75.92%	3,607	24.08%	7,765	51.84%	14,979
Ferry	2,498	74.54%	853	25.46%	1,645	49.09%	3,351
Franklin	16,818	75.23%	5,536	24.77%	11,282	50.47%	22,354
Garfield	1,107	82.61%	233	17.39%	874	65.22%	1,340
Grant	20,665	80.12%	5,126	19.88%	15,539	60.25%	25,791
Grays Harbor	19,922	70.46%	8,351	29.54%	11,571	40.93%	28,273
Island	24,271	57.80%	17,721	42.20%	6,550	15.60%	41,992
Jefferson	8,902	43.26%	11,674	56.74%	-2,772	-13.47%	20,576
King	403,675	42.22%	552,558	57.78%	-148,883	-15.57%	956,233
Kitsap	69,603	57.64%	51,146	42.36%	18,457	15.29%	120,749
Kittitas	12,998	67.40%	6,287	32.60%	6,711	34.80%	19,285
Klickitat	6,913	64.75%	3,764	35.25%	3,149	29.49%	10,677
Lewis	27,020	79.31%	7,049	20.69%	19,971	58.62%	34,069
Lincoln	4,753	85.01%	838	14.99%	3,915	70.02%	5,591
Mason	18,953	68.39%	8,762	31.61%	10,191	36.77%	27,715
Okanogan	11,789	70.25%	4,993	29.75%	6,796	40.50%	16,782
Pacific	7,258	66.52%	3,653	33.48%	3,605	33.04%	10,911
Pend Oreille	5,342	77.24%	1,574	22.76%	3,768	54.48%	6,916
Pierce	205,194	62.87%	121,209	37.13%	83,985	25.73%	326,403
San Juan	4,036	36.51%	7,020	63.49%	-2,984	-26.99%	11,056
Skagit	34,594	63.22%	20,128	36.78%	14,466	26.44%	54,722
Skamania	3,702	65.93%	1,913	34.07%	1,789	31.86%	5,615
Snohomish	195,431	60.73%	126,389	39.27%	69,042	21.45%	321,820
Spokane	148,279	65.36%	78,591	34.64%	69,688	30.72%	226,870
Stevens	17,717	79.18%	4,659	20.82%	13,058	58.36%	22,376
Thurston	69,108	55.43%	55,574	44.57%	13,534	10.85%	124,682
Wahkiakum	1,707	70.80%	704	29.20%	1,003	41.60%	2,411
Walla Walla	16,799	65.76%	8,747	34.24%	8,052	31.52%	25,546
Whatcom	56,051	51.20%	53,413	48.80%	2,638	2.41%	109,464
Whitman	9,873	57.11%	7,416	42.89%	2,457	14.21%	17,289
Yakima	48,759	70.45%	20,452	29.55%	28,307	40.90%	69,211
Totals	1,745,703	56.56%	1,340,725	43.44%	404,978	13.12%	3,086,428
