= 2016 Washington Initiative 732 =

Failed carbon tax initiative

Washington Initiative 732 (2016)
- Washington Carbon Emission Tax and Sales Tax Reduction

Results
| Choice | Votes | % |
|---|---|---|
| Yes | 1,265,123 | 40.75% |
| No | 1,839,414 | 59.25% |

Yes
90–100%
80–90%
70–80%
60–70%
50–60%
No
90–100%
80–90%
70–80%
60–70%
50–60%
Other
Tie
No data

Washington Initiative 732 (I-732) was a ballot initiative in 2016 to levy a carbon tax in the State of Washington, and simultaneously reduce the state sales tax. It was rejected 59.2% to 40.8%. The measure appeared on the November 2016 ballot. The backers of I-732 submitted roughly 350,000 signatures in December 2015 to certify the initiative.

The initiative was spearheaded by environmental economist Yoram Bauman, a strong advocate of carbon pricing. It was modeled after the British Columbia carbon tax, which was considered "popular across the political spectrum". The carbon tax in British Columbia caused the province's fuel consumption to decrease by 16% and its greenhouse gas emissions to decrease 3.5 times faster than the emissions of Canada as a whole, while maintaining steady economic growth.

== Ballot measure summary ==
The ballot measure summary as written by the Secretary of State of Washington:

"This measure would impose a carbon emission tax on the sale or use of certain fossil fuels and fossil-fuel-generated electricity, at $15 per metric ton of carbon dioxide in 2017, and increasing gradually to $100 per metric ton (2016 dollars adjusted for inflation), with more gradual phase-in for some users. It would reduce the sales tax rate by one percentage point over two years, increase a low-income sales tax exemption, and reduce certain manufacturing taxes."

== Provisions ==
Initiative 732 contained four provisions:

- Creates a new tax on the carbon content of fossil fuels initially set at $15 per ton, rising to $25 per ton after 6 months, and increasing annually to a cap of $100 per ton.
- Reduces the Washington State Sales Tax 1% from 6.5% to 5.5%
- Reduces the Business and Occupation Tax on Manufacturing Businesses in Washington State to .001%
- Funds the Working Families Tax rebate program, a 25% match on the state's version of the earned income tax credit for 460,000 Washington households.

== Supporting organizations ==
The primary sponsor of Initiative 732 was CarbonWA, a group founded by environmental economist Yoram Bauman to promote carbon pricing. The Audubon Society was also a major proponent of Initiative 732, "Audubon Washington believes Initiative 732 provides swift and effective action to reduce carbon pollution". Other organizations that supported Initiative 732 included the Sightline Institute, and the Citizens' Climate Lobby. Other supporters include Washington State legislator Joe Fitzgibbon (D), Washington State Senator Steve Litzow (R), Washington State Senator Joe Fain (R), Washington State Senator Cyrus Habib (D), and the editorial board of The Olympian. Climate scientist James Hansen, who has been involved with the Citizens' Climate Lobby for many years, strongly supported the proposal.

The backers of initiative 732 claimed that I-732 "taxes carbon to fight climate change, boost clean energy, & save the environment for future generations".

== Non-supporting organizations ==
Several environmental organizations chose to make a recommendation to "not support" the measure, as opposed to "support" or "oppose", including the Sierra Club, 350.org Seattle (who originally supported the measure, and later rescinded their support), and Climate Solutions.

Common points made in their statements included concerns that the initiative would result in a budget shortfall, and concerns over how the initiative would spend carbon fee receipts, e.g., Climate Solutions stated:

I-732 does not address the needs of communities hit hardest by pollution and the workers, energy-intensive businesses and others that will be most affected by the transition off of fossil fuels. These communities and sectors need investment in both infrastructure and services to address the health and environmental impacts of fossil fuel pollution and to enable them to benefit equitably from the transition to clean energy.

== Opposing organizations ==
Opponents to Initiative 732 included the Washington State Labor Council, stating: "I-732 would send Washington in the wrong direction and create more damaging austerity choices", the Association of Washington Businesses, and Longview Daily News.

Several organizations opposed the measure from an "environmental justice" perspective, or with a reference to the necessary breadth of the supporting coalition, including Front and Centered (formerly: Communities of Color for Climate Justice), and the Washington Environmental Council, stating:

We have learned from past attempts in state and around the world, that in order to pass transformational carbon pollution policy and then defend against the oil industry’s attempts to repeal the law we must work with a broad, politically-powerful coalition. Washington Conservation Voters and Washington Environmental Council are part of a statewide coalition of leaders and grassroots activists representing communities of color, health organizations, labor groups, businesses, the faith community and others who are working together to develop, pass and defend a policy that will stand for the long haul in Washington and serve as an example for other states to follow.

== Results ==
Initiative 732 failed with 59% voting against.

2016 Washington Initiative 732
| Choice | Votes | % |
|---|---|---|
| For | 1,265,123 | 40.75 |
| Against | 1,839,414 | 59.25 |
| Total | 3,104,537 | 100.00 |
Source: Washington Secretary of State

=== By county ===
County results
| County | No | | Yes | | Margin | | Total votes |
| County | # | % | # | % | # | % | Total votes |
|---|---|---|---|---|---|---|---|
| Adams | 3,250 | 72.58% | 1,228 | 27.42% | 2,022 | 45.15% | 4,478 |
| Asotin | 6,535 | 69.31% | 2,893 | 30.69% | 3,642 | 38.63% | 9,428 |
| Benton | 56,599 | 71.06% | 23,047 | 28.94% | 33,552 | 42.13% | 79,646 |
| Chelan | 21,675 | 66.99% | 10,680 | 33.01% | 10,995 | 33.98% | 32,355 |
| Clallam | 24,043 | 63.42% | 13,868 | 36.58% | 10,175 | 26.84% | 37,911 |
| Clark | 125,775 | 64.72% | 68,571 | 35.28% | 57,204 | 29.43% | 194,346 |
| Columbia | 1,642 | 76.76% | 497 | 23.24% | 1,145 | 53.53% | 2,139 |
| Cowlitz | 31,032 | 69.77% | 13,443 | 30.23% | 17,589 | 39.55% | 44,475 |
| Douglas | 10,758 | 71.34% | 4,322 | 28.66% | 6,436 | 42.68% | 15,080 |
| Ferry | 2,646 | 75.51% | 858 | 24.49% | 1,788 | 51.03% | 3,504 |
| Franklin | 16,533 | 70.70% | 6,851 | 29.30% | 9,682 | 41.40% | 23,384 |
| Garfield | 926 | 77.04% | 276 | 22.96% | 650 | 54.08% | 1,202 |
| Grant | 20,572 | 74.28% | 7,123 | 25.72% | 13,449 | 48.56% | 27,695 |
| Grays Harbor | 18,839 | 67.52% | 9,062 | 32.48% | 9,777 | 35.04% | 27,901 |
| Island | 25,157 | 60.35% | 16,525 | 39.65% | 8,632 | 20.71% | 41,682 |
| Jefferson | 10,417 | 53.52% | 9,045 | 46.48% | 1,372 | 7.05% | 19,462 |
| King | 462,186 | 48.59% | 489,028 | 51.41% | -26,842 | -2.82% | 951,214 |
| Kitsap | 72,147 | 59.40% | 49,317 | 40.60% | 22,830 | 18.80% | 121,464 |
| Kittitas | 12,261 | 67.09% | 6,015 | 32.91% | 6,246 | 34.18% | 18,276 |
| Klickitat | 7,138 | 68.54% | 3,276 | 31.46% | 3,862 | 37.08% | 10,414 |
| Lewis | 25,275 | 75.25% | 8,311 | 24.75% | 16,964 | 50.51% | 33,586 |
| Lincoln | 4,482 | 80.51% | 1,085 | 19.49% | 3,397 | 61.02% | 5,567 |
| Mason | 18,365 | 66.97% | 9,056 | 33.03% | 9,309 | 33.95% | 27,421 |
| Okanogan | 11,861 | 71.51% | 4,725 | 28.49% | 7,136 | 43.02% | 16,586 |
| Pacific | 6,807 | 66.27% | 3,465 | 33.73% | 3,342 | 32.54% | 10,272 |
| Pend Oreille | 5,047 | 75.29% | 1,656 | 24.71% | 3,391 | 50.59% | 6,703 |
| Pierce | 210,290 | 62.94% | 123,807 | 37.06% | 86,483 | 25.89% | 334,097 |
| San Juan | 4,594 | 43.82% | 5,889 | 56.18% | -1,295 | -12.35% | 10,483 |
| Skagit | 34,462 | 63.51% | 19,802 | 36.49% | 14,660 | 27.02% | 54,264 |
| Skamania | 3,739 | 68.74% | 1,700 | 31.26% | 2,039 | 37.49% | 5,439 |
| Snohomish | 196,927 | 59.47% | 134,206 | 40.53% | 62,721 | 18.94% | 331,133 |
| Spokane | 152,618 | 67.43% | 73,704 | 32.57% | 78,914 | 34.87% | 226,322 |
| Stevens | 17,472 | 77.90% | 4,957 | 22.10% | 12,515 | 55.80% | 22,429 |
| Thurston | 77,427 | 60.71% | 50,111 | 39.29% | 27,316 | 21.42% | 127,538 |
| Wahkiakum | 1,623 | 72.33% | 621 | 27.67% | 1,002 | 44.65% | 2,244 |
| Walla Walla | 16,665 | 67.46% | 8,040 | 32.54% | 8,625 | 34.91% | 24,705 |
| Whatcom | 60,011 | 56.08% | 47,005 | 43.92% | 13,006 | 12.15% | 107,016 |
| Whitman | 10,681 | 62.33% | 6,455 | 37.67% | 4,226 | 24.66% | 17,136 |
| Yakima | 50,937 | 67.43% | 24,603 | 32.57% | 26,334 | 34.86% | 75,540 |
| Totals | 1,839,414 | 59.25% | 1,265,123 | 40.75% | 574,291 | 18.50% | 3,104,537 |

== Aftermath ==
Although I-732 failed to pass, Carbon Washington continued to work to put a price on carbon emissions in the State of Washington. They worked with others to support Washington Initiative 1631, a carbon tax measure that appeared on the ballots in 2018 but was also rejected.

== See also ==
- Citizen's Climate Lobby
- Pigouvian tax
- Carbon Washington | Yes On Initiative 732 | Carbon Tax Swap, the campaign website for this measure
