= List of Washington (state) ballot measures =

The U.S. state of Washington has had a system of direct voting since gaining statehood in 1889. Citizens and the state legislature both have the ability to place new legislation, or legislation recently passed by the state legislature, on the ballot for a popular vote. Washington has three types of ballot measures that can be voted on in a general election: initiatives, referendums, and legislatively referred constitutional amendments. In order to be placed on the ballot, supporters of a measure must gather signatures from registered voters. From 1898 to 1912, the only ballot measures allowed were legislatively referred constitutional amendments. In 1912, an amendment successfully passed to create a citizen-led process for initiatives and referendums, and the first successful initiative was passed in 1914.

Since adopting this process, ballot measures have become widely accepted as part of Washington's electoral system. As of 2020, over 2,000 different initiatives had been filed with the state, along with a significantly smaller number of referendums. Of those, only a fraction have received the required signatures to be placed on the ballot. In recent years, ballot measures have been used to legalize politically contentious policies such as assisted suicide, same-sex marriage, and marijuana use. The use of signature gatherers (workers paid to gather signatures for ballot measures) has attracted significant controversy in the state, as has some activists' aggressive approach to ballot measures.

== Background ==
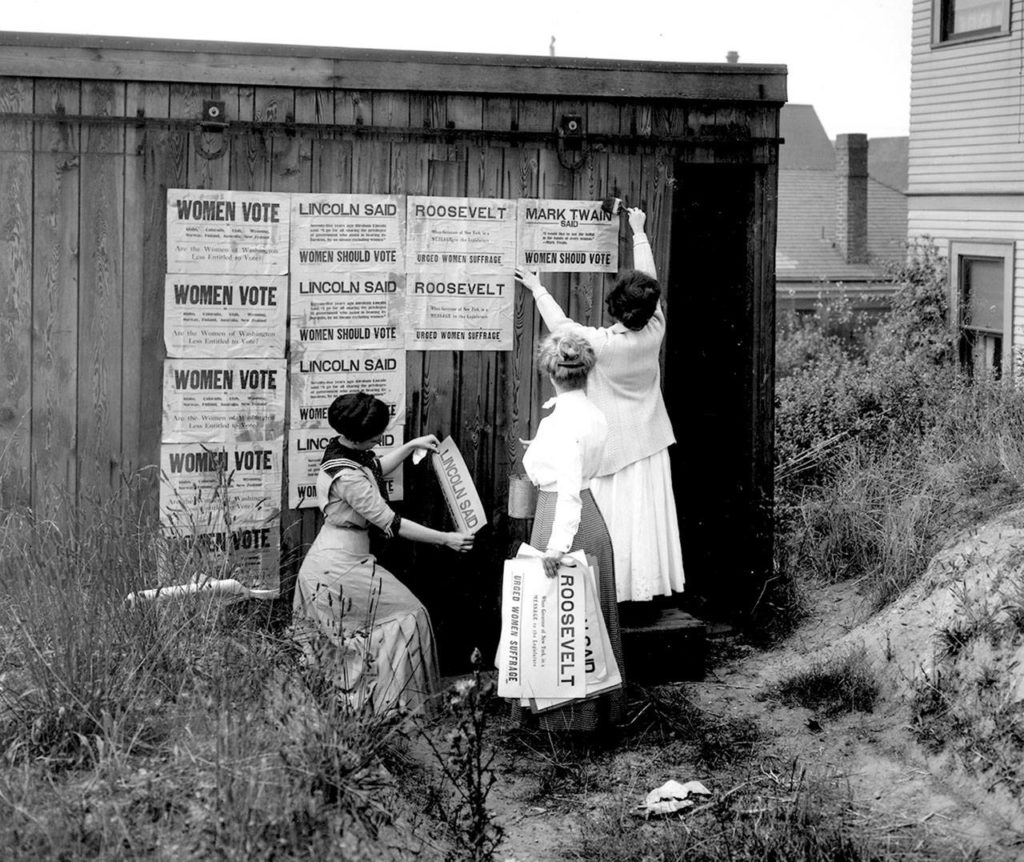
Supporters of women's suffrage campaign in 1910

Washington entered the United States as a territory in 1853 and was admitted as the 42nd state on November 11, 1889. The Constitution of Washington, which had itself been approved by a vote of the people, laid out the first guidelines for ballot measures. Article XXIII, Section 1 dictated that constitutional amendments required passing by a two-thirds vote in the state legislature and being approved by a majority of voters in the next general election. This section also required that details of the amendment should be published in newspapers across the state before election day.

In 1912, Constitutional Amendment Article II, Sec. 1 passed. This amendment granted people the power to place measures on the ballot every election via petition. For one of these measures to be valid, it needed signatures of support from at least eight percent of the voting population, based on turnout from the previous election. Initiatives allowed people to propose new laws and referendums allowed people to challenge laws passed by the legislature. This system of "direct legislation" had previously been implemented in Oregon by William Simon U'Ren. In the time since this amendment's passage, initiatives and referendums have become a prominent piece of Washington's electoral landscape.

The prominence of ballot measures, especially citizen-submitted ones, has allowed Washington to lead the nation in social issues. In 1910, people approved an amendment granting women the right to vote, making Washington the fifth state to guarantee women's suffrage. The passage of Initiative Measure 1000 (the "Death with Dignity Act") in 2008 made Washington the second state in the nation to legalize assisted suicide. The following year, voters approved Referendum Measure 71, which marked the first time voters had expanded recognition of queer relationships at the ballot box. In 2012, Referendum Measure 74 passed, making Washington the ninth state to recognize same-sex marriage and the third to do so by popular vote. That same year, the passage of Initiative Measure 502 led to Washington becoming the first state to fully legalize marijuana for recreational use.

While state law on signature gathering includes a recommendation that organizers should not be paid to gather signatures, the practice of paying workers per signature gathered has been legal in Washington since 1994. Supporters of the practice claim that it allows campaigns to extend their reach and makes ballot access more accessible and point to measures that have passed with widespread public support as evidence. The practice has been criticized for potentially allowing campaigns to "buy their way onto the ballot", most notably by former Secretary of State Ralph Munro. Some paid signature gatherers have been arrested on charges of forgery and election fraud for placing fake signatures on petitions.

Since sponsoring his first measure in 1997, Tim Eyman has been the most prolific sponsor of initiatives and referendums in the state. He has had 17 initiatives placed on the ballot as of 2021, with 11 being approved. Of those, only two have not since been overturned or modified by the courts. Eyman's 2007 Initiative Measure 960 passed with 51% of the vote and created a new system of "advisory votes" for all tax increases passed by the legislature in Washington. While most of this initiative was overturned by the Washington Supreme Court in 2013, this system still stands. Advisory votes are not legally binding and exist solely to measure public approval, as such, they are not considered to be ballot measures.

== Types of ballot measures ==
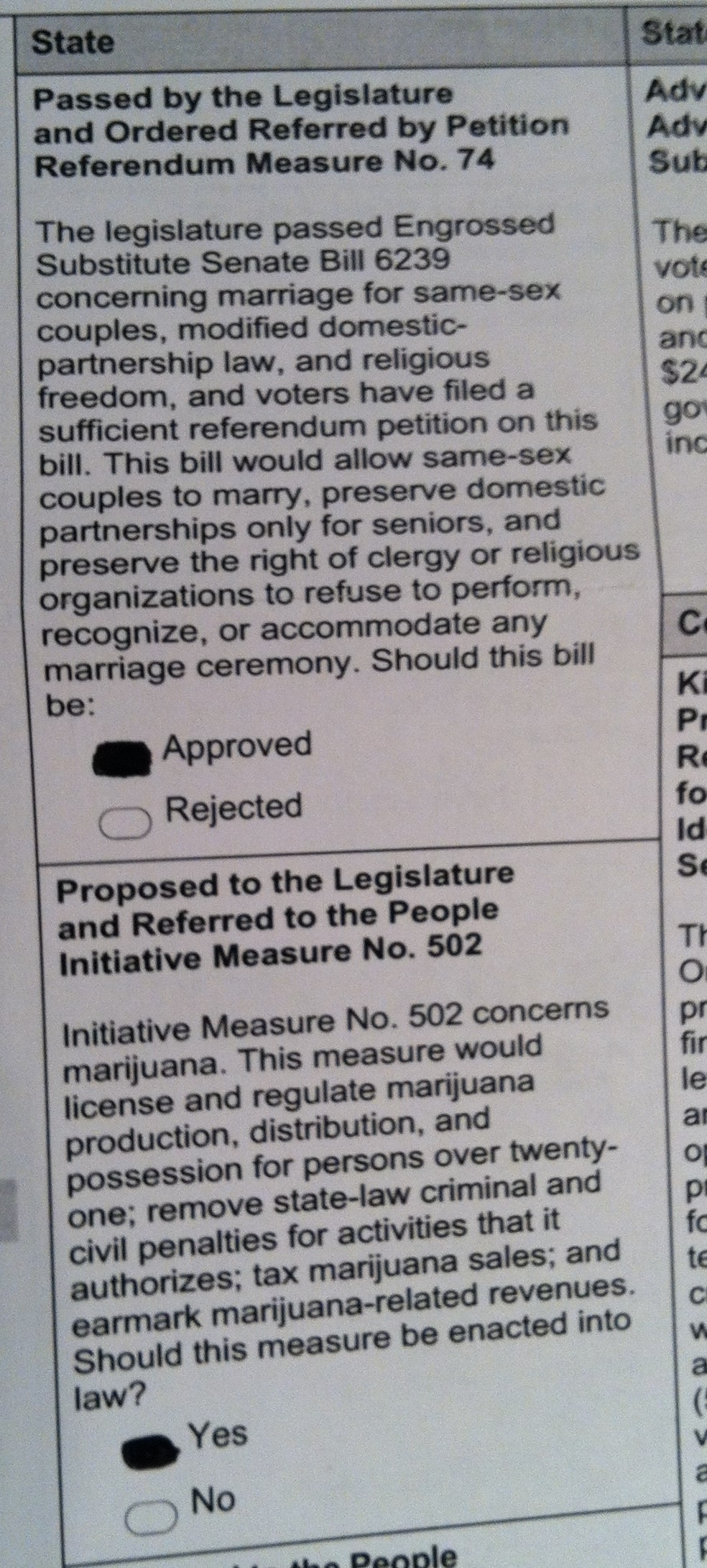
A ballot from 2012 showing Referendum 74 and Initiative 502, which legalized gay marriage and marijuana.

=== Initiatives ===
There are two types of initiatives in Washington.

- Initiatives to the People are placed on the ballot and, if passed, become law. These initiatives require a number of signatures equal to or greater than eight percent of the votes cast in the previous state gubernatorial race. The signatures must be gathered over a period of six months.
- Initiatives to the Legislature are first submitted to the Washington Legislature for consideration. These initiatives require a number of signatures equal to or greater than eight percent of the votes cast in the previous state gubernatorial race. The signatures must be gathered over a period of ten months. If the legislature passes the initiative, it is enacted into law. If the legislature rejects the initiative, it is placed on the ballot for a vote of the people. If the legislature passes an alternative version, both the original and modified version will appear on the ballot.

=== Referendums ===
There are two types of referendums in Washington.

- Referendum measures are laws that have been passed by the legislature and are up for recall. These referendums require a number of signatures equal to or greater than six percent of the votes cast in the previous state gubernatorial race.
- Referendum bills are proposed laws that are placed on the ballot by the legislature. If passed by a public vote, they become law.

=== Legislatively referred constitutional amendments ===
Legislatively referred constitutional amendments are changes to the Washington State Constitution which have been approved by the legislature but require approval from the people. They require a two-thirds vote in the state legislature before being placed on the ballot.

== 1800s ==
=== 1898 ===
Ballot Measures from 1898
Measure name	Description	Status	Yes votes	No votes
Constitutional Amendment Article VII, Sec. 2	An amendment creating a standard rate of taxation that would have been applied to all property in the state	Failed	15,986 (32.08%)	33,850 (67.92%)
1898 Washington Women's Suffrage Amendment	An amendment granting women the right to vote in elections	Failed	20,658 (40.35%)	30,540 (59.96%)

== 1900–1949 ==
=== 1900 ===
Ballot Measures from 1900
Measure name	Description	Status	Yes votes	No votes
Constitutional Amendment Article VII, Sec. 2	An amendment providing property owners with a $300 property tax exemption (equivalent to $11,600 in 2025)	Passed	35,398 (79.77%)	8,975 (20.23%)

=== 1904 ===
Ballot Measures from 1904
Measure name	Description	Status	Yes votes	No votes
Constitutional Amendment Article I, Sec. 11	An amendment allowing the state legislature to employ chaplains at prisons and rehabilitation centers	Passed	17,508 (60.63%)	11,371 (39.37%)

=== 1906 ===
Ballot Measures from 1906
Measure name	Description	Status	Yes votes	No votes
Constitutional Amendment Article I, Sec. 16	An amendment legalizing and defining the state's power to use eminent domain	Failed	15,257 (42.1%)	20,984 (57.9%)
Constitutional Amendment Article XXI, Sec. 1	An amendment classifying water use for irrigation, mining, manufacturing, and the removal of timber products a public use	Failed	18,462 (47.68%)	20,258 (52.32%)

=== 1908 ===
Ballot Measures from 1908
Measure name	Description	Status	Yes votes	No votes
Constitutional Amendment Article VII	An amendment forbidding the taxation of property to the amount of $300 (equivalent to $10,700 in 2025)	Failed	28,371 (32.02%)	60,244 (67.98%)
Constitutional Amendment Article I, Sec. 16	An amendment legalizing and defining the state's power to use eminent domain	Failed	26,849 (33.74%)	52,721 (66.26%)

=== 1910 ===
Ballot Measures from 1910
Measure name	Description	Status	Yes votes	No votes
Constitutional Amendment Article VI	An amendment granting women the right to vote in state elections	Passed	52,299 (63.8%)	29,676 (36.2%)
Constitutional Amendment Article III, Sec. 10	An amendment detailing the line of succession for the office of governor	Passed	51,257 (78.32%)	14,186 (21.68%)

=== 1912 ===
Ballot Measures from 1912
Measure name	Description	Status	Yes votes	No votes
Constitutional Amendment Article II, Sec. 1	An amendment creating a referendum and initiative process for state elections, allowing citizens to place measures on the ballot	Passed	110,110 (71.49%)	43,905 (28.51%)
Constitutional Amendment Article II, Sec. 31	An amendment legalizing and establishing guidelines for recall elections for state officials	Passed	79,940 (62.49%)	47,978 (37.51%)
Constitutional Amendment Article XI, Sec. 7	An amendment determining that all laws, except those relating to the budget and those passed in a state of emergency, should go into effect 90 days after being signed by the governor	Failed	67,717 (44.89%)	83,138 (55.11%)
Constitutional Amendment Article I, Sec. 33–34	An amendment removing term limits for all county-level officials except treasurers	Passed	112,321 (70.78%)	47,372 (29.22%)

=== 1914 ===
Ballot Measures from 1914
Measure name	Description	Status	Yes votes	No votes
Constitutional Amendment Article II, Sec. 33	An amendment allowing non-citizen residents to purchase land in the state	Failed	55,080 (20.58%)	212,542 (79.42%)
Initiative to the People 10	A measure requiring convicts to act as employees for infrastructure projects such as the construction of highways, with their paychecks being sent to their dependent families	Failed	111,805 (37.83%)	183,726 (62.17%)
Initiative to the People 13	A measure banning the practice of mandatory overtime and requiring that employers offer additional pay if their employees worked more than eight hours in a single day	Failed	118,881 (35.83%)	212,935 (64.17%)
Initiative to the People 6	A measure granting the state government the power to regulate individuals and businesses involved in the selling of securities, for the purpose of preventing fraud	Failed	142,017 (49.09%)	147,298 (50.91%)
Initiative to the People 7	A measure abolishing the state's "bureau of inspection and supervision of public offices" and transferring all power and responsibility held by the office to the state auditor	Failed	117,882 (41.37%)	167,080 (58.63%)
Initiative to the People 8	A measure banning companies from charging their employees for employment and charging fees for job interviews	Passed	162,054 (52.86%)	144,544 (47.14%)
Initiative to the People 9	A measure requiring employers to pay for their employee's medical expenses if they were accrued due to a workplace injury	Failed	143,738 (48.25%)	151,166 (51.75%)
Referendum Measure 1	A measure creating a public retirement fund for teachers and school administrative officials, with the fund being overseen by an independent board of trustees.	Failed	59,051 (18.96%)	252,356 (81.04%)
Referendum Measure 2	A measure authorizing $40,000,000 in funds for an irrigation project in Grant, Adams, Chelan, and Douglas counties (equivalent to $1.3×10^{9} in 2025)	Failed	102,315 (35.11%)	189,065 (64.89%)
Initiative to the People 3	A measure prohibiting the production, distribution, and storage of alcoholic beverages, except in cases when alcohol has been prescribed by a doctor	Passed	189,840 (52.58%)	171,208 (47.42%)

=== 1916 ===
Ballot Measures from 1916
Measure name	Description	Status	Yes votes	No votes
Initiative to the Legislature 18	A measure allowing private citizens to purchase alcoholic beverages for home use, allowing hotels to sell alcoholic beverages, and implementing a licensing system for producers and sellers	Failed	48,354 (15.51%)	263,390 (84.49%)
Initiative to the People 24	A measure legalizing the production and sale of beer, provided it has an alcohol content between one and four percent and the producer and seller are licensed by the state	Failed	105,803 (30.13%)	245,399 (69.87%)
Referendum Measure 3	A measure adding additional requirements for initiatives and referendums to make it onto the general ballot	Failed	62,117 (24.03%)	196,363 (75.97%)
Referendum Measure 4	A measure instituting additional requirements for recall elections, including specific guidelines for petitioners and election officials	Failed	63,646 (24.07%)	193,686 (75.30%)
Referendum Measure 5	An act creating state and county-level political conventions for each party and instead requiring them to nominate their candidates for office at convention rather than through a primary election	Failed	49,370 (19.76%)	200,499 (80.24%)
Referendum Measure 6	A measure banning the practice of picketing for the purpose of disrupting a business' regular activities	Failed	85,672 (31.88%)	183,042 (68.12%)
Referendum Measure 7	A measure requiring that public utility services gain certification from a state-level commission, with certifications only being awarded if the commission sees a need for a new utility service	Failed	46,921 (18.87%)	201,742 (81.13%)
Referendum Measure 8	A measure creating new state port districts and detailing their regulation	Failed	45,264 (18.82%)	192,523 (81.18%)
Referendum Measure 9	A measure requiring that local governments, school districts, parks districts, and port districts set budgets every year and only incur expenses within the confines of their budget	Failed	87,205 (32.40%)	181,933 (67.60%)
Constitutional Amendment Article VI, Sec. 1	An amendment requiring that all voters be taxpayers for ballot measures that deal with state funds and debt	Failed	88,963 (33.05%)	180,179 (66.95%)

=== 1918 ===
Ballot Measures from 1918
Measure name	Description	Status	Yes votes	No votes
Referendum Measure 10	A measure prohibiting the sale, manufacture, and storage of alcohol for all purposes except religious. This measure would supersede previous ballot measures which established that alcohol was only acceptable for medical reasons.	Passed	96,100 (63.89%)	54,322 (36.11%)
House Joint Resolution 1	A measure calling for a state constitutional convention	Failed	55,148 (48.43%)	58,713 (51.57%)

=== 1920 ===
Ballot Measures from 1920
Measure name	Description	Status	Yes votes	No votes
Constitutional Amendment Article III	An amendment fixing the salary of the state governor, lieutenant governor, secretary of state, treasurer, auditor, attorney general and superintendent	Failed	71,284 (29.51%)	170,242 (70.49%)
Referendum Bill 1	A measure establishing a new highway system, funded by driver's license fees and new taxes	Failed	117,452 (37.98%)	191,783 (62.02%)
Referendum Bill 2	A measure requiring the government to pay veterans of World War One $15 a month for the rest of their life, provided that they were residents of Washington at the time of their service (equivalent to $200 in 2025)	Passed	224,356 (71.80%)	88,128 (28.20%)
Constitutional Amendment Article I, Sec. 16	An amendment legalizing and defining the state's power to use eminent domain	Passed	121,022 (51.65%)	113,287 (48.35%)

=== 1922 ===
Ballot Measures from 1922
Measure name	Description	Status	Yes votes	No votes
Constitutional Amendment Article II, Sec. 23	An amendment raising the pay of state legislators from $5 a day to $10 a day (equivalent to $200 in 2025)	Failed	52,621 (24.56%)	161,677 (75.44%)
Constitutional Amendment Article VIII, Sec. 4	An amendment requiring that payments from the state budget be made within one calendar month of the end of the next fiscal year	Passed	94,746 (52.20%)	86,746 (47.80%)
Initiative to the People 40	A measure repealing the state's poll tax	Passed	193,356 (75.28%)	63,494 (24.72%)
Initiative to the People 46	A measure establishing a state school fund capable of providing $30 of funding per student and distributing funding to different schools and districts based on their enrollment (equivalent to $1,100 in 2025)	Failed	99,150 (39.78%)	150,114 (60.22%)
Referendum Measure 12	A measure allowing public utility companies to receive certification even if another company already provides a similar service	Failed	64,800 (29.49%)	154,905 (70.51%)
Referendum Measure 13	A measure allowing parents to opt their children out of physical examination and vaccination requirements for state schools	Failed	96,874 (38.29%)	156,113 (61.71%)
Referendum Measure 14	A measure enforcing a closed primary system, where only registered members of a political party can cast a vote in that party's primary	Failed	60,593 (26.98%)	164,004 (73.02%)
Referendum Measure 15	A measure redefining the role of the precinct committee for elections and party conventions	Failed	57,324 (29.01%)	140,299 (70.99%)
Constitutional Amendment Article I, Sec. 22	An amendment requiring trials for people who committed crimes on trains, boats, or other vehicles to be tried in any county the vehicle passed through, rather than the one the crime was committed in	Passed	122,972 (60.15%)	81,457 (39.85%)

=== 1924 ===
Ballot Measures from 1924
Measure name	Description	Status	Yes votes	No votes
Initiative to the People 49	A measure requiring children between the ages of seven and seventeen to attend public school and fining their parents if they do not	Failed	158,922 (41.78%)	221,500 (58.22%)
Initiative to the People 50	A measure to limit the tax rate of personal property by state, county, municipalities, and school districts	Failed	128,677 (37.78%)	211,948 (62.22%)
Initiative to the People 52	A measure to allow cities and towns to buy and sell electricity without needing to pay tax, and providing for the construction of electric plants	Failed	139,492 (39.09%)	217,393 (60.91%)
Referendum Bill 3	A measure allowing cities and towns to sell surplus electricity with a tax of 5%, and providing for the construction of electric plants	Failed	99,459 (32.26%)	208,809 (67.74%)
Referendum Measure 16	A measure banning the production and sale of butter substitutes that contain vegetable fat or any base that is not milk	Failed	169,047 (45.44%)	203,016 (54.56%)
Constitutional Amendment Article XI, Sec. 5	An amendment allowing the state legislature to classify counties by population and provide for additional resources to larger counties	Passed	137,093 (51.52%)	129,003 (48.48%)
Constitutional Amendment Article XV, Sec. 1	An amendment authorizing the state to relocate harbor lines and extend harbor lines without giving up state control	Failed	99,694 (39.47%)	152,911 (60.53%)

=== 1926 ===
Ballot Measures from 1926
Measure name	Description	Status	Yes votes	No votes
Constitutional Amendment Add Article XXVIII	An amendment modifying the taxation of reforested land and timber harvested from that land in order to encourage reforestation	Failed	87,158 (44.77%)	107,524 (55.23%)
Constitutional Amendment Article II, Sec. 23	An amendment compensating every state legislator $300 a year (equivalent to $5,500 in 2025) and 10¢ for every mile of travel (equivalent to $2 in 2025)	Failed	75,329 (38.53%)	120,158 (61.47%)

=== 1928 ===
Ballot Measures from 1928
Measure name	Description	Status	Yes votes	No votes
Constitutional Amendment Article VII, Sec. 1–4	An amendment redefining the categorization of property for taxation (in which property was taxed at an equal rate) in favor of a progressive tax system	Failed	131,126 (48.21%)	140,887 (51.79%)

=== 1930 ===
Ballot Measures from 1930
Measure name	Description	Status	Yes votes	No votes
House Joint Resolution 13	A measure to allow county commissioners to fill state legislative vacancies that occur before a scheduled election	Passed	133,255 (60.33%)	87,633 (39.67%)
Initiative to the Legislature 1	A measure allowing local governments to create public utility districts, providing for the construction of power plants and water treatment facilities, and authorizing taxes to fund those public utility districts	Failed	152,487 (53.81%)	130,901 (46.19%)
Initiative to the People 57	A measure to provide for a 46-member Senate and a 99-member house, based on a 46-district system for elections and representation	Passed	116,436 (50.17%)	115,641 (49.83%)
Senate Joint Resolution 10	An amendment to increase the compensation for state legislators to $500 annually	Failed	107,947 (44.85%)	132,750 (55.15%)
Constitutional Amendment Article VII, Sec. 1–4	An amendment redefining the categorization of property for taxation (in which property was taxed at an equal rate) in favor of a progressive tax system	Passed	138,231 (60.89%)	88,784 (39.11%)

=== 1932 ===
Ballot Measures from 1932
Measure name	Description	Status	Yes votes	No votes
Constitutional Amendment Article XV, Sec. 1	An amendment authorizing the state to relocate harbor lines and extend harbor lines without giving up state control	Passed	170,101 (53.44%)	148,201 (46.56%)
Initiative to the People 58	A measure providing permanent voter registration and creating new government positions to keep voter rolls up-to-date	Passed	372,061 (83.15%)	75,381 (16.85%)
Initiative to the People 61	A measure removing restrictions on the import, production, and storage of alcohol, but keeping restrictions on saloons and dedicated bars	Passed	341,450 (62.12%)	208,211 (37.88%)
Initiative to the People 62	A measure creating a new government department to handle hunting regulation (the Washington Department of Fish and Wildlife)	Passed	270,421 (53.84%)	231,863 (46.16%)
Initiative to the People 64	A measure to limit the tax rate of personal property by state, county, municipalities, and school districts	Passed	303,384 (61.41%)	190,619 (38.59%)
Initiative to the People 69	A measure establishing an income tax for the purposes of funding the state budget, removing the property tax that previously funded the budget, and establishing a program to handle the administration of the tax	Passed	322,919 (70.21%)	136,983 (29.79%)
Senate Joint Resolution 11	An amendment granting the state legislature the power to temporarily increase the money amount or property value involved in a controversy to give the Washington Supreme Court jurisdiction in that case	Failed	153,079 (46.64%)	175,130 (53.36%)
Senate Joint Resolution 16	An amendment to increase the compensation for state legislators to $500 annually (equivalent to $11,800 in 2025)	Failed	117,665 (31.63%)	254,345 (68.37%)
House Joint Resolution 5	An amendment to fix the number of state legislators until 1941 and then require reapportion of legislators based on each new census	Failed	162,895 (47.45%)	180,417 (52.55%)

=== 1934 ===
Ballot Measures from 1934
Measure name	Description	Status	Yes votes	No votes
House Joint Resolution 12	An amendment to implement equalized tax rates and remove all exemptions from taxation	Failed	134,908 (43.37%)	176,154 (56.63%)
House Joint Resolution 14	A measure barring the state legislature from imposing taxes at the local level	Failed	129,310 (40.62%)	189,002 (59.38%)
Initiative to the People 77	A measure banning fish traps for salmon in state waters, net fishing for salmon in the Columbia River, creating distinct areas for trolling, and establishing a salmon fishing season	Passed	275,507 (64.17%)	153,811 (35.83%)
Initiative to the People 94	A measure to limit the tax rate of personal property by state, county, municipalities, and school districts	Passed	219,635 (53.33%)	192,168 (46.67%)
Referendum Measure 18	A measure allowing cities and towns to use and sell electricity	Passed	221,590 (58.03%)	160,244 (41.97%)

=== 1936 ===
Ballot Measures from 1936
Measure name	Description	Status	Yes votes	No votes
House Joint Resolution 10	A measure authorizing the state to produce electricity, specifically hydroelectric power	Failed	173,930 (38.44%)	278,543 (61.56%)
Initiative to the People 101	A measure creating a state civil service commission to manage employees of the state, counties, cities, ports, schools, parks, and libraries	Failed	208,904 (41.03%)	300,274 (58.97%)
Initiative to the People 114	A measure to limit the tax rate of personal property by state, county, municipalities, and school districts	Passed	417,641 (77.61%)	120,478 (22.39%)
Initiative to the People 115	A measure establishing a state department for pensions and implementing a pension system for Washington residents over the age of 60	Failed	153,551 (30.24%)	354,162 (69.76%)
Initiative to the People 119	A measure creating government districts to manufacture and sell commodities and employ people who are otherwise unemployed	Failed	97,329 (20.82%)	370,140 (79.18%)
Referendum Bill 4	A measure creating a state fund for flood control measures	Failed	114,055 (25.45%)	334,035 (74.55%)
Senate Joint Resolution 20	A measure to increase compensation for state legislators to $10 a day, with $5 a day for expenses and $5 a day for services and mileage (equivalent to $200 in 2025)	Failed	124,639 (28.44%)	313,660 (71.56%)
Senate Joint Resolution 7	A measure to implement uniform tax policies, along with a graduated income tax and exemptions	Failed	93,598 (22.17%)	326,675 (77.83%)

=== 1938 ===
Ballot Measures from 1938
Measure name	Description	Status	Yes votes	No votes
Initiative to the People 126	A measure making the position of Washington Superintendent of Public Instruction a non-partisan position	Passed	293,202 (65.69%)	153,142 (34.31%)
Initiative to the People 129	A measure to limit the tax rate of personal property by state, county, municipalities, and school districts	Passed	340,296 (69.47%)	149,534 (30.53%)
Initiative to the People 130	A measure requiring that unions provide employers with written demands before strikes and only call for strikes after a majority of their members vote for one. This measure would also fine employees and unions who fail to meet these standards.	Failed	268,848 (47.64%)	295,431 (52.36%)
Senate Joint Resolution 5	An amendment clarifying that nothing in the Constitution of Washington bars the state from implementing an income tax	Failed	141,375 (33.08%)	285,946 (66.92%)

=== 1940 ===
Ballot Measures from 1940
Measure name	Description	Status	Yes votes	No votes
Initiative to the People 139	A measure requiring voter approval for bonds, securities, or other financial obligations issued or incurred by a public utility district	Failed	253,318 (41.13%)	362,508 (58.87%)
Initiative to the People 141	A measure providing a minimum $40 grant every month to Washington citizens over 65 years of age (equivalent to $900 in 2025)	Passed	358,009 (58.04%)	258,819 (41.96%)
Referendum Bill 5	A measure to limit the tax rate of personal property by state, county, municipalities, school districts, and road districts	Passed	390,639 (72.28%)	149,843 (27.72%)
Senate Joint Resolution 1	An amendment repealing term limits for county officers	Failed	208,407 (43.75%)	267,938 (56.25%)
Senate Joint Resolution 8	An amendment authorizing the state legislature to provide that stockholders of banks organized under Washington law be relieved from personal liability to the same extent as stockholders in national banks organized under federal law	Passed	255,047 (57.45%)	188,929 (42.55%)
House Joint Resolution 13	An amendment allowing citizens, by initiative, or the state legislature, to change the salary of government officials	Failed	183,478 (41.39%)	259,842 (58.61%)

=== 1942 ===
Ballot Measures from 1942
Measure name	Description	Status	Yes votes	No votes
Referendum Measure 22	A measure to expand industrial insurance by increasing benefits for injured workers, raising the age of minor dependents, and providing additional time for filing a claim	Passed	246,257 (69.35%)	108,845 (30.65%)
Referendum Measure 23	A measure providing for an attorney independent from the prosecuting attorney to assist and advise grand juries	Failed	126,972 (46.13%)	148,226 (53.87%)
Referendum Measure 24	A measure forbidding prosecuting attorneys from appearing before or giving advice to grand juries	Failed	114,603 (43.57%)	148,439 (56.43%)
Referendum Bill 6	A measure to limit the tax rate of personal property by state, county, municipalities, school districts, and road districts	Passed	252,431 (76.97%)	75,540 (23.03%)
Initiative to the People 151	A measure providing benefits to senior citizens in Washington, including additional medical services, burial expenses, and supplemental grants	Failed	160,084 (41.57%)	225,027 (58.43%)
Constitutional Amendment Article VII, Sec. 2	An amendment clarifying that nothing in the Constitution of Washington bars the state from implementing an income tax	Failed	89,453 (33.66%)	176,332 (66.34%)

=== 1944 ===
Ballot Measures from 1944
Measure name	Description	Status	Yes votes	No votes
House Joint Resolution 1	A measure to limit the tax rate of personal property	Passed	357,488 (33.40%)	179,273 (66.60%)
House Joint Resolution 4	An amendment requiring that revenue from driver's license fees and taxes on fuel be used for highway purposes only	Passed	358,581 (69.03%)	160,898 (30.97%)
Initiative to the People 157	A measure providing for the creation of a State Social Security Board and a State Social Security System, which would expand the scope of unemployment benefits, disability benefits, and senior citizen's benefits	Failed	240,565 (37.31%)	404,356 (62.29%)
Initiative to the People 158	A measure implementing a 3% tax on income, with all revenue directed towards monthly payments of $60 for the elderly, blind, disabled, and widows (equivalent to $1,100 in 2025)	Failed	184,405 (29.65%)	437,502 (70.35%)
Referendum Bill 25	A measure permitting joint public utility districts	Failed	297,919 (44.40%)	373,051 (55.60%)

=== 1946 ===
Ballot Measures from 1946
Measure name	Description	Status	Yes votes	No votes
Initiative to the People 166	A measure requiring voter approval for property purchases and bonds acquired by public utility districts	Failed	220,239 (37.45%)	367,836 (62.55%)
Referendum Measure 27	A measure creating a State Timber Resources Board which would have final say on all purchases and sales relating to state timber and state forest land	Failed	107,731 (20.34%)	422,026 (79.66%)
House Joint Resolution 9	An amendment allowing the state to impose property tax on federal property in the state	Passed	235,819 (56.08%)	198,786 (43.92%)
Referendum Measure 26	A measure allowing the governor of Washington to appoint and remove members from the State Game Commission	Failed	69,490 (13.43%)	447,819 (86.57%)

=== 1948 ===
Measure name	Description	Status	Yes votes	No votes
House Joint Resolution 4	An amendment repealing term limits for county officers	Passed	337,554 (54.45%)	282,324 (45.55%)
Initiative to the Legislature 13	A measure banning any entity except for the state of Washington from selling alcohol	Failed	208,337 (25.71%)	602,141 (74.29%)
Initiative to the People 169	A measure increasing benefits for veterans of World War II, funded by state bonds and a tobacco tax	Passed	438,518 (56.52%)	337,410 (43.48%)
Initiative to the People 171	A measure regulating the sale of alcohol, restricting the amount of liquor licenses issued, and imposing fines on businesses that sell alcohol without a license	Passed	416,227 (52.71%)	373,418 (47.29%)
Initiative to the People 172	A measure providing the elderly and blind with a minimum of $60 a month to cover their basic living expenses	Passed	420,751 (54.40%)	352,642 (45.60%)
House Joint Resolution 13	A measure permitting the formation of combined city and county charters with a population of more than 300,000	Passed	291,699 (50.34%)	287,813 (49.66%)
Senate Joint Resolution 4	An amendment allowing the state legislature to fix the salaries of elected state officials	Passed	318,319 (50.62%)	310,516 (49.38%)
Senate Joint Resolution 5	An amendment allowing counties to adopt "Home Rule" charters	Passed	296,624 (52.44%)	269,018 (47.56%)

== 1950–1999 ==
=== 1950 ===
Ballot Measures from 1950
Measure name	Description	Status	Yes votes	No votes
House Joint Resolution 10	An amendment permitting school districts to take on additional debt when authorized by a vote of the people	Failed	286,189 (47.68%)	314,014 (52.32%)
Initiative to the People 178	A measure transferring Washington's public assistance medical program to the Washington State Department of Health	Passed	394,261 (57.09%)	296,290 (42.91%)
Initiative to the People 176	A measure increasing the minimum social security grant from $60 to $65 (equivalent to $900 in 2025)	Failed	159,400 (22.97%)	534,689 (77.03%)
Referendum Measure 28	A measure establishing a system of disability compensation for disabled people who are still employed	Failed	163,923 (25.96%)	467,574 (74.04%)
Referendum Bill 9	A measure providing $20,000,000 for the construction of new buildings at state universities and colleges (equivalent to $268,000,000 in 2025)	Failed	312,500 (49.81%)	314,840 (50.19%)
Referendum Bill 8	A measure providing $20,000,000 for the construction of new buildings at state charitable, educational, and penal institutions (equivalent to $268,000,000 in 2025)	Passed	377,941 (59%)	262,615 (41%)
Referendum Bill 7	A measure providing $40,000,000 for the construction of new buildings at public schools (equivalent to $535,000,000 in 2025)	Passed	395,417 (61.44%)	248,200 (38.56%)
Senate Joint Resolution 9	An amendment permitting Canadians to own land in Washington, provided that they live in a province in which citizens of Washington are allowed to own land	Passed	292,857 (50.24%)	290,005 (49.76%)

=== 1952 ===
Ballot Measures from 1952
Measure name	Description	Status	Yes votes	No votes
Substitute House Joint Resolution 13	An amendment granting superior courts jurisdiction in cases where the controversy amounts to $1,000 or less (equivalent to $12,000 in 2025) and granting justices of the peace jurisdiction in cases where the controversy amounts to less than $300 (equivalent to $4,000 in 2025)	Passed	389,626 (54.66%)	323,133 (45.34%)
House Joint Resolution 8	An amendment permitting school districts to take on additional debt when authorized by a vote of the people	Passed	409,985 (51.49%)	386,324 (48.51%)
Initiative to the People 180	A measure legalizing the manufacture, transportation, possession, sale, use, and serving of yellow oleomargarine	Passed	836,580 (83.63%)	163,752 (16.37%)
Initiative to the People 181	A measure establishing state-wide observance of standard time unless otherwise dictated by the federal government	Passed	597,558 (60.03%)	397,928 (39.97%)
Initiative to the People 184	A measure transferring the state public assistance medical program to the Department of Social Security	Failed	265,193 (29.08%)	646,634 (70.92%)
Substitute Senate Joint Resolution 7	An amendment forbidding the state legislature from overturning an act approved by the people until either two years have passed since the vote or two-thirds of the state legislature vote in favor of overturning such an act	Passed	468,782 (60.13%)	310,797 (39.87%)
House Joint Resolution 6	An amendment requiring all state-level judges to retire by the age of 75 and allowing the state legislature to lower the age and add additional causes for retirement	Passed	618,141 (74.11%)	215,958 (25.89%)

=== 1954 ===
Ballot Measures from 1954
Measure name	Description	Status	Yes votes	No votes
Initiative to the People 194	A measure to ban television advertising of alcoholic beverages between 8:00 am and 10:00 pm	Failed	207,746 (25.23%)	615,794 (74.77%)
Initiative to the People 188	A measure to establish an independent Board of Chiropractic Examiners which would oversee educational requirements for chiropractors and implement increased educational requirements	Failed	320,179 (39.37%)	493,108 (60.63%)
Initiative to the People 192	A measure increasing regulation of commercial salmon fishing by creating fishing districts, establishing preserves where fishing is prohibited, and authorizing law enforcement to seize illegal fishing gear without warrants	Failed	237,004 (29.92%)	555,151 (70.08%)
Initiative to the People 193	A measure establishing a state-wide daylight saving time observance from the last Sunday in April to the last Sunday in September	Failed	370,005 (44.71%)	457,529 (55.29%)
House Joint Resolution 16	An amendment clarifying that corporations with non-resident shareholders are still allowed to own land in Washington	Passed	364,382 (55.15%)	296,362 (44.85%)

=== 1956 ===
Ballot Measures from 1956
Measure name	Description	Status	Yes votes	No votes
Initiative to the People 198	A measure banning membership in labor unions	Failed	329,653 (31.86%)	704,903 (68.14%)
Initiative to the People 199	A measure adding three new legislative districts, three new members to the state senate, and replacing precincts with census tracts	Passed	448,121 (52.45%)	406,287 (47.55%)
Senate Joint Resolution 3	An amendment allowing pensions paid to public officials to be increased while those officials are holding office	Failed	261,419 (32.29%)	548,184 (67.71%)
Senate Joint Resolution 4	An amendment requiring initiatives to receive signatures equal to 8% of total votes cast in the last election and referendums to receive signatures equal to 4% of total votes cast in the last election before being placed on the general ballot	Passed	413,107 (54.03%)	351,518 (45.97%)
Senate Joint Resolution 6	An amendment removing term limits for the state treasurer	Passed	411,453 (52.32%)	374,905 (47.68%)
Senate Joint Resolution 14	An amendment allowing county commissioners to fill vacancies in the legislature	Passed	454,199 (60.77%)	293,159 (39.23%)
House Joint Resolution 22	An amendment empowering the legislature to grant courts the authority to seize property before the final decision in eminent domain cases	Failed	292,750 (38.57%)	466,193 (61.43%)

=== 1958 ===
Ballot Measures from 1958
Measure name	Description	Status	Yes votes	No votes
Referendum Bill 10	A measure allocating up to $25,000,000 for the construction of new buildings at state charitable, educational, and penal institutions; along with new buildings at state supported institutions of higher learning (equivalent to $279,000,000 in 2025)	Passed	402,937 (50.71%)	391,726 (49.29%)
Senate Joint Resolution 12	An amendment creating a seven-member commission that would handle redistricting every ten years	Failed	320,567 (46.76%)	365,018 (53.24%)
Senate Joint Resolution 14	An amendment empowering the state legislature to allow the employment of chaplains in state custodial, correctional, and mental institutions	Passed	492,047 (63.76%)	297,700 (36.24%)
Senate Joint Resolution 18	An amendment forbidding the legislature from granting additional compensation to public employees after their service has been completed, with an exception for pension payments	Passed	388,797 (51.13%)	371,652 (48.87%)
Initiative to the People 202	A measure forbidding labor union membership as a requirement for employment	Failed	339,742 (36.27%)	596,949 (63.73%)
Initiative to the Legislature 23	A measure providing civil service status for employees of county sheriff departments and creating an independent civil service commission to handle any administrative tasks that arise as a result of this measure	Passed	539,640 (65.08%)	289,575 (34.92%)
Referendum Measure 30	A measure making life insurance payments taxable under the inheritance tax	Failed	52,223 (6.05%)	811,539 (93.95%)
Substitute Senate Joint Resolution 9 Part I	An amendment empowering the legislature to change the compensation of elected officials at the state and county levels	Failed	199,361 (26.98%)	539,483 (73.02%)
Substitute Senate Joint Resolution 9 Part II	An amendment allowing current members of the legislature to be appointed or elected to civil offices	Failed	140,142 (19.72%)	570,630 (80.28%)
Senate Joint Resolution 10	An amendment authorizing the modification of the Washington border according to interstate compacts, if approved by the federal government	Passed	395,969 (56.09%)	309,922 (43.91%)
Substitute House Joint Resolution 4	An amendment permitting school districts to implement tax levies if approved by at least three-fifths of the affected population in a vote of the people	Failed	293,386 (37.78%)	483,165 (62.22%)

=== 1960 ===
Ballot Measures from 1960
Measure name	Description	Status	Yes votes	No votes
Initiative to the Legislature 25	A measure prohibiting the construction of large dams along specific stretches of the Columbia River if it would interfere with the migration range of fish	Passed	526,130 (52.11%)	483,449 (47.89%)
Initiative to the People 205	A measure creating a new liquor license for taverns allowing them to sell alcoholic liquor	Failed	357,455 (30.89%)	799,643 (69.11%)
Initiative to the People 207	A measure establishing a civil service system for state employees and providing for the administration of that system	Passed	606,511 (56.25%)	471,730 (43.75%)
Initiative to the People 208	A measure authorizing joint tenancies and allowing property rights to pass from one tenant to the other in case of death	Passed	647,529 (60.05%)	430,698 (39.95%)
Initiative to the People 210	A measure establishing a state-wide daylight saving time observance from the last Sunday in April to the last Sunday in September	Passed	596,135 (51.71%)	556,623 (48.29%)
Senate Joint Resolution 4	An amendment allowing non-residents to own land in Washington	Failed	466,705 (45.27%)	564,250 (54.73%)

=== 1962 ===
Ballot Measures from 1962
Measure name	Description	Status	Yes votes	No votes
House Joint Resolution 19	An amendment reducing residency requirements for voting in elections, allowing Native Americans to vote in elections, and allowing new movers to the state to vote in elections	Failed	392,172 (49.47%)	400,630 (50.53%)
House Joint Resolution 9	An amendment empowering the legislature to temporarily fill other state-level elected positions if an emergency resulting from enemy attack prevents the incumbents from fulfilling their duty	Passed	496,596 (64.03%)	279,175 (35.97%)
Senate Joint Resolution 21	An amendment allowing non-residents to own land in Washington	Failed	400,839 (48.35%)	428,276 (51.65%)
Senate Joint Resolution 9	An amendment clarifying that a voters pamphlet should be sent to each individual place of residence, rather than sent to each registered voter	Passed	484,666 (60.60%)	315,088 (39.40%)
Substitute House Joint Resolution 1	An amendment permitting cities and towns to authorize tax levies in excess of the legal limit if three-fifths of the affected population approves in a vote of the people	Failed	189,125 (23.35%)	620,973 (76.65%)
Initiative Measure 211	A measure redistricting the state legislature	Failed	396,419 (47.33%)	441,085 (52.67%)
Referendum Measure 32	A measure empowering the Washington State Department of Agriculture to oversee and regulate the production, distribution, and sale of dairy products	Failed	153,419 (18.46%)	677,530 (81.54%)
Referendum Measure 33	A measure allowing cities and towns to conduct audits using private accountants instead of the state auditor	Failed	242,189 (30.06%)	563,475 (69.94%)
Substitute Senate Joint Resolution 1	An amendment permitting school districts to authorize tax levies in excess of the legal limit if three-fifths of the affected population approves in a vote of the people	Failed	249,489 (29.44%)	597,928 (70.56%)
Senate Joint Resolution 25	An amendment requiring that any proposed changes to the constitution be published in weekly newspapers throughout the state at a regular basis leading up to the election	Passed	417,451 (54.15%)	353,448 (45.85%)
House Joint Resolution 6	An amendment empowering the Washington Supreme Court to temporarily appoint new judges to itself and to superior courts throughout Washington	Passed	539,800 (69.51%)	236,805 (30.49%)

=== 1964 ===
Ballot Measures from 1964
Measure name	Description	Status	Yes votes	No votes
Initiative to the People 215	A measure allowing money earned from taxes on boat fuel to be used to purchase or improve marine recreation lands	Passed	665,737 (63.56%)	381,743 (36.44%)
Referendum Bill 11	A measure authorizing up to $10,00,000 for the acquisition of outdoor public recreational land (equivalent to $104,000,000 in 2025)	Passed	614,903 (58.57%)	434,978 (41.43%)
Referendum Bill 12	A measure authorizing up to $59,000,000 for the construction of new public schools (equivalent to $612,000,000 in 2025)	Passed	782,682 (72.25%)	300,674 (27.75%)
Referendum Bill 13	A measure authorizing up to $4,600,000 for the construction of a new juvenile prison (equivalent to $48,000,000 in 2025)	Passed	761,862 (71.76%)	299,783 (28.24%)
Referendum Measure 34	A measure easing restrictions on gambling machines, salesboards, cardrooms, and bingo devices	Failed	622,987 (55.20%)	505,633 (44.80%)
Senate Joint Resolution 1	An amendment allowing cities to frame their own charters if they have more than 10,000 inhabitants	Passed	687,016 (72.31%)	263,101 (27.69%)

=== 1966 ===
Ballot Measures from 1966
Measure name	Description	Status	Yes votes	No votes
Initiative to the People 226	A measure requiring that one-tenth of total sales tax collected by the state be distributed to cities and towns on a per-capita basis	Failed	403,700 (43.98%)	514,281 (56.02%)
Initiative to the People 229	A measure repealing restrictions on what people may do on a Sunday, including restrictions on alcohol consumption and sports	Passed	604,096 (64.40%)	333,972 (35.60%)
Initiative to the People 233	A measure increasing the maximum legal size of train cars	Passed	591,051 (63.48%)	339,978 (36.52%)
Referendum Bill 14	A measure authorizing $16,500,000 for the construction of new public schools (equivalent to $164,000,000 in 2025)	Passed	583,705 (66.93%)	288,357 (33.07%)
Referendum Bill 15	A measure authorizing $40,575,000 to be distributed to institutions of higher education, the department of institutions, the department of natural resources, and other needs identified by the legislature (equivalent to $403,000,000 in 2025)	Passed	597,715 (69.37%)	263,902 (30.63%)
Referendum Bill 16	A measure redrawing the boundaries of the state's congressional district to equalize the population of each	Passed	416,630 (52.01%)	384,366 (47.99%)
Senate Joint Resolution 6	An amendment removing elections for Superior Court judges if there would only be one candidate on the ballot	Passed	635,318 (80.05%)	158,291 (19.95%)
Senate Joint Resolution 20	An amendment allowing non-citizens to own land in Washington	Passed	430,984 (50.94%)	415,082 (49.06%)
Senate Joint Resolution 22, Part 1	An amendment creating a school construction fund at the state level	Passed	602,360 (73.21%)	220,395 (26.79%)
Senate Joint Resolution 22, Part 2	An amendment allowing a state school fund to be invested according to the wants of the legislature	Passed	581,245 (72.33%)	222,401 (27.67%)
Senate Joint Resolution 25	An amendment clarifying that public funds for port districts are considered public funds for the public interest	Passed	415,064 (53.57%)	359,714 (46.43%)
House Joint Resolution 4	An amendment extending the right to vote in the presidential elections to all US citizens, provided that they have lived in Washington at least 60 days and intend to make Washington their permanent residence	Passed	645,966 (80.57%)	155,808 (19.43%)
House Joint Resolution 7	An amendment authorizing the legislature to exempt retired people's homes from property tax statues	Passed	661,497 (75.86%)	210,553 (24.14%)
House Joint Resolution 39	An amendment requiring that any legislative action that would modify the state's debt be publicized in the newspaper in the leadup to a vote	Passed	569,889 (74.67%)	193,299 (25.33%)

=== 1968 ===
Ballot Measures from 1968
Measure name	Description	Status	Yes votes	No votes
Initiative to the People 242	A measure stating that the act of driving a vehicle on a state road implies consent for a breath test	Passed	792,242 (66.70%)	394,644 (23.30%)
Initiative to the People 245	A measure reducing the amount of interest or one-time fees that can be considered a "retail service charge"	Passed	642,902 (53.80%)	551,394 (46.20%)
Referendum Measure 35	A measure adding discrimination on the basis of race, creed, color, or national origin as grounds for the suspension of a real estate license	Passed	580,578 (53.37%)	276,161 (46.43%)
Referendum Bill 17	A measure authorizing up to $25,000,000 for the construction and improvement of water pollution control facilities (equivalent to $231,000,000 in 2025)	Passed	845,372 (75.38%)	276,161 (24.62%)
Referendum Bill 18	A measure authorizing up to $40,000,000 for the purchase and care of outdoor recreation areas and facilities (equivalent to $370,000,000 in 2025)	Passed	763,806 (68.29%)	354,646 (31.71%)
Referendum Bill 19	A measure authorizing up to $63,059,000 to be distributed to institutions of higher education (equivalent to $584,000,000 in 2025)	Passed	606,236 (56.95%)	458,358 (43.05%)
Initiative Measure 32	A measure creating a new state agency called the Full Employment Commission and requiring timber harvests to be processed at plants employing Washington residents	Failed	716,291 (61.40%)	450,559 (38.60%)
Senate Joint Resolution 5	An amendment allowing public pension and retirement funds to be invested	Passed	770,325 (72.05%)	298,788 (27.95%)
Senate Joint Resolution 6	An amendment creating the Washington Court of Appeals	Passed	650,025 (63.72%)	370,059 (36.28%)
Senate Joint Resolution 17	An amendment empowering the legislature to create a new state agency called the "state building authority"	Passed	521,162 (51.07%)	499,344 (48.93%)
Senate Joint Resolution 24	An amendment detailing the qualifications needed to fill a vacancy in state or county offices	Passed	744,656 (74.33%)	257,168 (25.67%)
House Joint Resolution 1	An amendment requiring that agricultural, forest, and open space properties be taxed based on use, not potential use	Passed	705,978 (67.79%)	335,496 (32.21%)
House Joint Resolution 13	An amendment increasing the pay of government officials who do not set their own pay	Passed	541,002 (53.09%)	478,119 (46.91%)

=== 1970 ===
Ballot Measures from 1970
Measure name	Description	Status	Yes votes	No votes
Initiative Measure 251	A measure mandating that the state cannot increase or add additional taxes	Failed	504,779 (48.91%)	527,263 (51.09%)
Initiative Measure 256	A measure banning the sale of drinks in containers with a recycling deposit value of five cents or lower	Failed	511,248 (48.72%)	538,118 (51.28%)
Referendum Bill 20	A measure legalizing abortion in the first four months of a pregnancy	Passed	599,959 (56.49%)	462,174 (43.51%)
Referendum Bill 21	A measure extending the previous authorization of $40,000,000 in funding for the purchase and development of outdoor recreational areas (equivalent to $370,000,000 in 2025)	Passed	520,162 (52.29%)	474,548 (47.71%)
Referendum Bill 22	A measure extending the previous authorization of $63,059,000 in funding for institutions of higher education (equivalent to $584,000,000 in 2025)	Failed	399,608 (41.01%)	574,887 (58.99%)
Referendum Bill 23	A measure extending the previous authorization of $25,000,000 in funding for water pollution control facilities (equivalent to $231,000,000 in 2025)	Passed	581,819 (58.37%)	414,976 (41.63%)
House Joint Resolution 6	An amendment lowering the voting age from twenty-one to nineteen	Failed	473,029 (45.33%)	570,438 (54.67%)
House Joint Resolution 42	A measure fixing the maximum property tax rate at 1% and imposing a flat-rate, state-level income tax	Failed	309,882 (31.55%)	672,446 (68.45%)

=== 1972 ===
Ballot Measures from 1972
Measure name	Description	Status	Yes votes	No votes
Initiative Measure 258	A measure allowing cities with a population of over 150,000 to have grayhound race tracks	Failed	526,371 (37.02%)	895,385 (62.98%)
Initiative Measure 261	A measure privatizing state-owned liquor stores and barring the state from distributing or selling alcohol	Failed	634,973 (44.89%)	779,568 (55.11%)
Initiative Measure 276	A measure requiring political campaigns to disclose the source of their funding, limiting the amount of money that can be spent as part of a campaign, and regulating the activities of lobbyists	Passed	959,143 (72.02%)	372,693 (27.98%)
Referendum Bill 24	A measure further regulating the activities of lobbyists in the state legislature	Passed	696,455 (54.72%)	576,404 (45.28%)
Referendum Bill 25	A measure regulating campaign contributions and expenditures	Passed	694,818 (54.72%)	574,856 (45.28%)
Referendum Bill 26	A measure authorizing $225,000,000 in funding for the construction and improvement of public waste disposal facilities (equivalent to $1.732×10^{9} in 2025)	Passed	827,077 (62.82%)	489,459 (37.18%)
Referendum Bill 27	A measure authorizing $75,000,000 in funding for the construction and improvement of water supply facilities (equivalent to $577,000,000 in 2025)	Passed	790,063 (59.22%)	544,176 (40.78%)
Referendum Bill 28	A measure authorizing $40,000,000 in funding for the construction and improvement of recreation areas and facilities (equivalent to $308,000,000 in 2025)	Passed	758,530 (56.67%)	579,975 (43.33%)
Referendum Bill 29	A measure authorizing $25,000,000 in funding for the construction and improvement of healthcare facilities (equivalent to $192,000,000 in 2025)	Passed	734,715 (55.29%)	594,172 (44.71%)
Referendum Bill 30	A measure authorizing $50,000,000 in funding for the construction and improvement of public transportation systems (equivalent to $385,000,000 in 2025)	Failed	637,841 (48.94%)	665,493 (51.06%)
Referendum Bill 31	A measure authorizing $50,000,000 in funding for the construction and improvement of community colleges (equivalent to $385,000,000 in 2025)	Passed	721,403 (54.80%)	594,963 (45.20%)
Initiative Measure 44	A measure limiting property tax levies without a vote of the people	Passed	930,275 (75.54%)	301,238 (24.46%)
Senate Joint Resolution 1	An amendment replacing the $40 rate property tax limit with a maximum allowable rate of 1% (equivalent to $300 in 2025)	Passed	686,320 (58.26%)	491,703 (41.74%)
Senate Joint Resolution 5	An amendment repealing the prohibition on lotteries and allowing them if a supermajority of the legislature or the people approve	Passed	787,251 (61.67%)	489,282 (38.33%)
Senate Joint Resolution 38	An amendment allowing county commissioners to set salaries for officials in the county (including their own)	Passed	658,095 (53.96%)	561,607 (46.04%)
House Joint Resolution 1	An amendment requiring the legislature to review all tax policies once every ten years	Failed	668,505 (55.09%)	544,868 (44.91%)
House Joint Resolution 21	An amendment allowing the people of a county to create a "city-county" government by majority vote	Passed	603,471 (50.20%)	598,557 (49.80%)
House Joint Resolution 47	An amendment redefining the approval formula for property tax levies	Passed	686,320 (58.26%)	491,703 (41.74%)
House Joint Resolution 52	An amendment empowering the legislature to increase state debt by a three-fifths majority vote	Passed	673,376 (58.53%)	477,144 (41.47%)
House Joint Resolution 61	An amendment clarifying that discrimination on the basis of sex is illegal	Passed	645,115 (50.13%)	641,746 (49.87%)

=== 1973 ===
Ballot Measures from 1973
Measure name	Description	Status	Yes votes	No votes
Initiative Measure 282	A measure limiting the salaries of elected officials and judges	Passed	798,338 (80.14%)	197,795 (19.86%)
Referendum Measure 36	A measure lowering the drinking age from 21 to 19	Failed	495,624 (49.26%)	510,491 (50.74%)
Referendum Bill 32	A measure requiring county auditors to appoint precinct committee-people to help register voters	Failed	291,323 (32.35%)	609,306 (67.65%)
Referendum Bill 33	A measure adding additional fees for personalized license plates and directing the increased revenue to wildlife conservation efforts	Passed	613,921 (62.89%)	362,195 (37.11%)
House Joint Resolution 22	An amendment allowing local governments to create tax districts for the purposes of funding development projects	Failed	246,055 (27.30%)	655,125 (72.70%)
House Joint Resolution 37	An amendment creating an income tax, prohibiting excess levies for public schools, and limiting some other taxes	Failed	228,823 (22.91%)	770,033 (77.09%)
House Joint Resolution 40	An amendment applying the excess levy validation formula to bonds payable from such levies	Failed	352,495 (41.27%)	501,618 (58.73%)

=== 1974 ===
Ballot Measures from 1974
Measure name	Description	Status	Yes votes	No votes
Referendum Bill 34	A measure establishing a state lottery	Failed (required at least 60% in favor)	515,404 (54.75%)	425,903 (42.25%)
Senate Joint Resolution 140	An amendment restricting the governor's veto power and allowing the legislature to reconsider vetoed bills	Passed	498,745 (54.32%)	419,437 (45.68%)
Senate Joint Resolution 143	An amendment establishing a thirty-day residency requirement to vote in elections	Passed	626,827 (68.28%)	291,178 (31.72%)

=== 1975 ===
Ballot Measures from 1975
Measure name	Description	Status	Yes votes	No votes
Initiative Measure 314	A measure eliminating school tax levies and replacing them with a 12% tax on corporations	Failed	323,831 (33.18%)	652,178 (66.82%)
Initiative Measure 316	A measure mandating the death penalty for people convicted of first degree aggravated murder	Failed	296,257 (30.90%)	662,535 (69.10%)
Referendum Bill 35	A measure requiring the governor fill United States Senate vacancies with a person belonging to the same political party as the incumbent	Failed	430,642 (46.18%)	501,894 (53.82%)
Senate Joint Resolution 101	An amendment redefining the authority of the Washington Supreme Court and District Courts and establishing a commission on judicial qualifications	Failed	408,832 (48.89%)	427,361 (51.11%)
Senate Joint Resolution 127	An amendment creating an independent commission to set legislative salaries and legislators' ability to run for other offices	Failed	355,399 (39.72%)	539,289 (60.28%)
House Joint Resolution 22	An amendment allowing the state to provide financial assistance for students of private educational institutions, not just public ones	Failed	369,775 (39.54%)	565,444 (60.46%)

=== 1976 ===
Ballot Measures from 1976
Measure name	Description	Status	Yes votes	No votes
Initiative Measure 322	A measure outlawing the practice of treating public water with fluoride	Failed	469,929 (35.05%)	870,631 (64.95%)
Initiative Measure 325	A measure outlining new requirements for nuclear power plants and requiring that they only be constructed if two-thirds of the legislature approves	Failed	482,953 (33.38%)	963,756 (66.62%)
Referendum Bill 36	A measure requiring state officials to publicly disclose their financials while holding public office	Passed	963,309 (69.65%)	419,693 (30.35%)
Senate Joint Resolution 137	An amendment allowing excess property tax levies for public schools, provided that they are approved by a vote of the people every two years	Passed	763,263 (56.12%)	596,722 (43.88%)
Senate Joint Resolution 139	An amendment requiring that salary changes in the legislature happen at the same time for all members	Failed	493,187 (36.44%)	860,405 (63.56%)
House Joint Resolution 64	An amendment creating a new state agency to draft county home-rule charter models	Failed	347,555 (28.03%)	892,419 (71.97%)

=== 1977 ===
Ballot Measures from 1977
Measure name	Description	Status	Yes votes	No votes
Initiative Measure 335	A measure prohibiting adult movie theaters, sex shops, and other businesses that sell "obscene publications"	Passed	522,921 (54.76%)	431,989 (45.24%)
Initiative Measure 345	A measure exempting food from state and local sales taxes	Passed	521,062 (54.00%)	443,840 (46.00%)
Initiative Measure 348	A measure replacing the variable system for fuel taxes with a stable system	Failed	470,147 (49.95%)	471,031 (50.05%)
Referendum Measure 39	A measure allowing voter registration by mail and absentee voting on one day's registration	Failed	303,353 (32.43%)	632,131 (67.57%)
Referendum Measure 40	A measure establishing an independent Washington State Women's Commission	Failed	259,761 (28.09%)	664,962 (71.91%)
Initiative Measure 59	A measure limiting public water withdrawal permits to farms of 2,000 acres (8.1 km^{2}) or lessf	Passed	457,054 (51.08%)	437,682 (48.92%)
Senate Joint Resolution 113	An amendment empowering the legislature to grant district courts jurisdiction in cases involving more than $1,000 (equivalent to $5,000 in 2025)	Passed	654,082 (76.23%)	203,936 (23.77%)
House Joint Resolution 55	An amendment empowering the legislature to establish passenger and freight transportation rate	Passed	461,975 (54.52%)	385,348 (45.48%)
House Joint Resolution 56	An amendment empowering the legislature to establish passenger and freight transportation rates based on more than a mileage variable alone	Failed	394,105 (49.28%)	405,635 (50.72%)
House Joint Resolution 57	An amendment allowing railroad companies to share earnings	Passed	447,544 (57.36%)	332,729 (42.64%)

=== 1978 ===
Ballot Measures from 1978
Measure name	Description	Status	Yes votes	No votes
Initiative Measure 350	A measure prohibiting forced school busing, limiting the control of school officials over students' assignments to different schools	Passed	585,903 (66.29%)	297,991 (33.71%)

=== 1979 ===
Ballot Measures from 1979
Measure name	Description	Status	Yes votes	No votes
Referendum Bill 37	A measure authorizing $25,000,000 in funding for facilities for the mentally and physically disabled (equivalent to $111,000,000 in 2025)	Passed	576,882 (66.83%)	286,365 (33.17%)
Initiative Measure 61	A measure banning the sale of drinks in containers with a recycling deposit of less than five cents	Failed	380,247 (42.37%)	517,177 (57.63%)
Initiative Measure 62	A measure limiting the growth of state tax revenues to the growth rate of personal income	Passed	588,724 (68.34%)	272,761 (31.66%)
Senate Joint Resolution 110	An amendment requiring that the legislature meet once a year, with additional meetings called at the discretion of the governor	Passed	508,063 (60.52%)	331,391 (39.48%)
Senate Joint Resolution 112	An amendment allowing legislators to hold other civil offices, provided that they not receive salary increases for that office while they hold a legislative position	Passed	469,049 (56.91%)	355,088 (43.09%)
Senate Joint Resolution 120	An amendment allowing local utility districts to provide financial assistance to homeowners until 1990	Passed	526,349 (62.80%)	311,768 (37.20%)

=== 1980 ===
Ballot Measures from 1980
Measure name	Description	Status	Yes votes	No votes
Initiative Measure 383	A measure banning the import and storage of non-medical radioactive waste (unless specifically agreed by an interstate compact)	Passed	1,211,606 (75.49%)	393,415 (24.51%)
Referendum Bill 38	A measure authorizing $125,000,000 in funding for water supply facilities (equivalent to $488,000,000 in 2025)	Passed	1,008,646 (65.66%)	527,454 (34.34%)
Referendum Bill 39	A measure authorizing $450,000,000 in funding for public waste management facilities (equivalent to $1.758×10^{9} in 2025)	Passed	964,450 (63.33%)	558,328 (36.67%)
Senate Joint Resolution 132	An amendment allowing the state to control federal public lands within its borders	Failed	579,060 (40.10%)	864,850 (59.90%)
House Joint Resolution 37	An amendment creating an independent judicial qualification commission and empowering the Washington Supreme Court to remove judges upon the commission's recommendation	Passed	1,043,490 (69.18%)	464,941 (30.82%)

=== 1981 ===
Ballot Measures from 1981
Measure name	Description	Status	Yes votes	No votes
Initiative Measure 394	A measure requiring a vote of the people before the legislature can finance major public energy projects	Passed	532,178 (58.06%)	384,419 (41.94%)
Initiative Measure 402	A measure replacing inheritance and gift taxes with a tax on the transfer of net estates	Passed	610,507 (67.24%)	297,445 (32.76%)
Senate Joint Resolution 107	An amendment removing constitutional limitations on Superior Court commissioners and delegating the power to create new limitations to the legislature	Failed	385,796 (46.74%)	439,542 (53.26%)
Senate Joint Resolution 133	An amendment giving the Secretary of State forty days to validate initiative petitions and prohibiting the legislature from undoing successful initiatives	Passed	581,724 (74.46%)	199,516 (25.54%)
House Joint Resolution 7	An amendment empowering local governments to issue industrial development bonds repaid by such developments instead of by public funds	Passed	450,580 (55.73%)	357,944 (44.27%)

=== 1982 ===
Ballot Measures from 1982
Measure name	Description	Status	Yes votes	No votes
Initiative Measure 412	A measure setting the maximum interest rate for retail installment contracts at 12%	Failed	452,710 (33.97%)	880,135 (66.03%)
Initiative Measure 414	A measure prohibiting the sale of drinks in containers with a recycling deposit of five cents or less	Failed	400,156 (29.29%)	965,951 (70.71%)
Initiative Measure 435	A measure replacing the state sales tax on food, corporate business tax, and the occupation tax with a 10% franchise tax on corporations	Failed	453,221 (33.76%)	889,091 (66.24%)
Senate Joint Resolution 143	An amendment allowing local governments to create tax districts for the purpose of financing development projects	Failed	393,030 (30.82%)	882,194 (69.18%)

=== 1983 ===
Ballot Measures from 1983
Measure name	Description	Status	Yes votes	No votes
Senate Joint Resolution 103	An amendment establishing an independent commission to handle redistricting every ten years	Passed	639,981 (61.07%)	407,916 (38.93%)
Senate Joint Resolution 105	An amendment extending maximum state harbor leases from thirty to fifty-five years	Failed	383,081 (38.08%)	622,840 (61.92%)
Senate Joint Resolution 112	An amendment allowing local governments to expand energy conservation funds and credits to any Washington resident	Failed	405,820 (40.24%)	602,719 (59.76%)

=== 1984 ===
Ballot Measures from 1984
Measure name	Description	Status	Yes votes	No votes
Initiative Measure 456	A measure to grant the state sole authority of natural resource management and petitioning the United States Congress to decommercialize steelhead	Passed	916,855 (53.16%)	807,825 (46.84%)
Initiative Measure 464	A measure excluding trade-ins from selling price sales tax	Passed	1,175,781 (68.95%)	529,560 (31.05%)
Initiative 471	A measure prohibiting public funds to be used for abortion procedures, unless such a procedure would prevent the death of the mother	Failed	838,083 (46.87%)	949,921 (53.13%)

=== 1985 ===
Ballot Measures from 1985
Measure name	Description	Status	Yes votes	No votes
House Joint Resolution 12	An amendment permitting worker's compensation funds to be invested according to the legislature	Passed	582,471 (71.37%)	233,728 (28.63%)
House Joint Resolution 22	An amendment eliminating voter turnout requirements for votes approving excess property tax levies for schools	Failed	369,852 (44.39%)	463,391 (55.61%)
House Joint Resolution 23	An amendment allowing local governments to create tax districts for the purpose of financing development projects	Failed	337,015 (41.42%)	476,600 (58.58%)
House Joint Resolution 42	An amendment permitting publicly funded agricultural commodity commissions to engage in promotional hosting to develop agricultural trade	Passed	536,528 (68.13%)	250,936 (31.87%)

=== 1986 ===
Ballot Measures from 1986
Measure name	Description	Status	Yes votes	No votes
Referendum Bill 40	A measure allowing state officials to challenge federal selection of nuclear waste repository sites and requiring a vote of the people if a Washington site was selected	Passed	1,055,896 (82.62%)	222,141 (17.38%)
Initiative Measure 90	A measure increasing sales taxes for the purpose of funding wildlife conservation and recreation programs	Failed	493,794 (38.63%)	784,382 (61.37%)
Senate Joint Resolution 136	An amendment expanding the authority and membership of the commission reviewing judicial conduct	Passed	696,932 (58.89%)	486,490 (41.11%)
Senate Joint Resolution 138	An amendment modifying the process of filling vacancies in state and county elected offices	Failed	557,447 (48.77%)	585,642 (51.23%)
House Joint Resolution 49	An amendment creating an independent commission which would set the salaries of elected officials	Passed	630,736 (52.30%)	575,213 (47.70%)
House Joint Resolution 55	An amendment permitting voters to authorize tax levies to finance school construction	Passed	712,816 (59.14%)	492,445 (40.86%)

=== 1987 ===
Ballot Measures from 1987
Measure name	Description	Status	Yes votes	No votes
Referendum Bill 41	A measure allowing Washington to challenge the constitutionality of some authorities delegated to the Federal Reserve in the United States Supreme Court	Failed	282,613 (34.29%)	541,387 (65.71%)
Initiative Measure 92	A measure banning doctors from charging patients on Medicare more than Medicare's "allowable/reasonable" charges	Failed	315,792 (35.64%)	572,813 (64.46%)
Senate Joint Resolution 8207	An amendment allowing retired Superior Court judges to handle pending cases, provided that the judge had already ruled in the case before retiring	Passed	495,273 (58.84%)	346,428 (41.16%)
Senate Joint Resolution 8212	An amendment allowing the legislature to invest public land funds in stocks and private lending	Failed	260,620 (32.09%)	551,408 (67.91%)
House Joint Resolution 4212	An amendment extending the term length for state legislators	Failed	283,742 (33.32%)	567,782 (66.68%)
House Joint Resolution 4220	An amendment instituting a statewide property tax for the construction of new public schools	Failed	283,118 (33.26%)	568,196 (66.74%)

=== 1988 ===
Ballot Measures from 1988
Measure name	Description	Status	Yes votes	No votes
Initiative Measure 518	A measure increasing the state minimum wage from $2.30 an hour to $4.25 an hour (equivalent to $12 in 2025)	Passed	1,354,454 (76.55%)	414,926 (23.45%)
Initiative Measure 97	A measure to impose a 0.7% tax on hazardous substances to fund hazardous waste cleanup programs. This measure was one of two options. The other option exempted some hazardous waste from taxation.	Passed	860,835 (56.00%)	676,469 (44.00%)
House Joint Resolution 4222	An amendment increasing the value of personal property exempt from taxation	Passed	1,248,183 (78.65%)	352,807 (21.35%)
House Joint Resolution 4223	An amendment extending the abilities of public utilities to assist in residential energy conservation	Passed	1,248,183 (76.70%)	379,153 (23.30%)
House Joint Resolution 4231	An amendment removing references to "idiots, insane, dumb, and defective youth" from the State Constitution	Passed	1,354,529 (81.37%)	310,114 (18.63%)

=== 1989 ===
Ballot Measures from 1989
Measure name	Description	Status	Yes votes	No votes
Initiative Measure 102	A measure funding children, family, and K-12 education services with $360,000,000 in new taxes (equivalent to $935,000,000 in 2025)	Failed	349,357 (33.65%)	688,782 (66.35%)
Senate Joint Resolution 8200	An amendment granting basic fundamental rights to victims of felony crimes	Passed	789,266 (78.11%)	221,179 (21.89%)
Senate Joint Resolution 8202	An amendment redefining the process and authority of the judicial review commission	Passed	804,199 (83.22%)	162,135 (16.78%)
Senate Joint Resolution 8210	An amendment permitting cities and towns to fund private efforts to conserve water	Passed	622,494 (63.95%)	350,876 (36.05%)

=== 1990 ===
Ballot Measures from 1990
Measure name	Description	Status	Yes votes	No votes
Initiative Measure 547	A measure requiring counties to engage in comprehensive land use planning in order to meet state growth and environmental protection goals	Failed	327,339 (24.91%)	968,505 (75.09%)
House Joint Resolution 4203	An amendment adding additional requirements for a new county to be formed	Failed	403,377 (33.24%)	810,098 (66.76%)
House Joint Resolution 4231	An amendment allowing voters to approve excess property tax levies for a period of up to six years	Failed	407,423 (32.45%)	848,026 (67.55%)
Senate Joint Resolution 8212	An amendment allowing property tax for low-income housing to be based on the property's current use	Failed	606,683 (49.94%)	608,223 (50.06%)

=== 1991 ===
Ballot Measures from 1991
Measure name	Description	Status	Yes votes	No votes
Initiative Measure 553	A measure adding term limits for governor, lieutenant governor, state legislature, and members of Congress	Failed	690,828 (45.98%)	811,686 (54.02%)
Initiative Measure 559	A measure reducing property taxes	Failed	592,391 (40.52%)	869,626 (59.48%)
Referendum Bill 42	A measure placing a tax on telephone lines for the purpose of funding a state 911 system	Passed	901,854 (61.14%)	573,251 (38.86%)
Initiative Measure 119	A measure legalizing assisted suicide for patients suffering from medically terminal conditions	Failed	701,808 (46.40%)	810,623 (53.60%)
Initiative Measure 120	A measure granting women the right to choose abortion prior to fetal viability	Passed	756,812 (50.04%)	752,590 (49.96%)
Senate Joint Resolution 8203	An amendment creating an alternative method of drafting county home rule charters	Failed	538,126 (42.99%)	713,648 (57.01%)
House Joint Resolution 4821	An amendment allowing counties to establish the number of Superior Court Commissioners	Failed	583,318 (45.21%)	706,807 (54.79%)
Substitute House Joint Resolution 4221	An amendment allowing courts other than the Superior Court to handle "cases in equity"	Failed	584,815 (48.82%)	613,040 (51.18%)

=== 1992 ===
Ballot Measures from 1992
Measure name	Description	Status	Yes votes	No votes
Initiative Measure 573	A measure adding term limits for governor, lieutenant governor, and state legislators	Passed	1,119,985 (52.38%)	1,018,260 (47.62%)
Initiative Measure 134	A measure limiting campaign contributions, prohibiting public funding of political campaigns, and restricting campaign fundraising activities	Passed	1,539,297 (72.90%)	576,161 (27.10%)

=== 1993 ===
Ballot Measures from 1993
Measure name	Description	Status	Yes votes	No votes
Initiative Measure 593	A measure establishing the three-strikes law, mandating life imprisonment for serious repeat offenders	Passed	1,135,521 (75.20%)	374,567 (25.80%)
Initiative Measure 601	A measure limiting state expenditures by inflation rates and population growth	Passed (Note: Overturned in 2013 by League of Educ. Voters v. State)	774,342 (51.21%)	737,735 (48.79%)
Initiative Measure 602	A measure limiting state revenue collections and expenditures on personal income	Failed	673,378 (44.61%)	836,047 (55.39%)
House Joint Resolution 4200	An amendment allowing counties and public hospitals to employ chaplains	Passed	851,333 (58.33%)	608,252 (41.67%)
House Joint Resolution 4201	An amendment granting District Courts jurisdiction over "cases in equity"	Passed	857,094 (66.71%)	427,702 (33.29%)

=== 1994 ===
Ballot Measures from 1994
Measure name	Description	Status	Yes votes	No votes
Initiative Measure 607	A measure allowing non-dentists to manufacture and sell dentures	Passed	955,960 (57.60%)	703,619 (42.40%)
Referendum Bill 43	A measure requiring that tax revenues from cigarettes, liquor, and pop syrup be distributed to violence reduction and drug enforcement programs	Passed	947,847 (57.08%)	712,575 (42.92%)

=== 1995 ===
Ballot Measures from 1995
Measure name	Description	Status	Yes votes	No votes
Initiative Measure 640	A measure rewriting fishing regulations to ensure specific survival rates for non-targeted species	Failed	566,880 (42.48%)	767,686 (57.52%)
Initiative Measure 651	A measure removing restrictions on gambling on tribal lands	Failed	350,708 (25.76%)	1,010,787 (74.24%)
Referendum Bill 45	A measure expanding the fish and wildlife commission's power to include shellfish and food fish regulation, the negotiation of interstate compacts, and the appointment of its own director	Passed	809,083 (60.9%)	517,433 (39.01%)
Referendum Measure 48	A measure restricting land-use regulations and expanding the government's liability to pay for reduced property values of land	Failed	544,788 (40.61%)	796,869 (59.39%)
Substitute Senate Joint Resolution 8210	An amendment enabling the legislature to reduce the size of the Washington Supreme Court and making the position of Chief Justice an elected position by members of the Court	Passed	723,297 (57.88%)	526,260 (42.12%)

=== 1996 ===
Ballot Measures from 1996
Measure name	Description	Status	Yes votes	No votes
Initiative Measure 655	A measure outlawing the taking, hunting, or attracting of black bears with bait and the hunting of bears, cougars, bobcat, and lynx with dogs	Passed	1,387,577 (62.99%)	815,385 (37.01%)
Initiative Measure 670	A measure requiring the placement of a ballot notice next to the names of certain candidates who do not support Congressional term limits	Failed	937,873 (44.99%)	1,146,865 (55.01%)
Initiative Measure 671	A measure allowing limited electronic gambling in tribal lands	Failed	934,344 (43.32%)	1,222,492 (56.68%)
Initiative Measure 173	A measure allowing the state to issue scholarship vouchers for schools of choice	Failed	775,281 (35.54%)	1,406,433 (64.46%)
Initiative Measure 177	A measure creating a new type of school district where nonprofit organizations could operate charter schools	Failed	762,367 (35.57%)	1,380,816 (64.43%)

=== 1997 ===
Ballot Measures from 1997
Measure name	Description	Status	Yes votes	No votes
Referendum Bill 48	A measure creating a public stadium authority to oversee the construction and operation of a football and soccer stadium for the Seattle Seahawks	Passed	820,364 (51.15%)	783,584 (48.85%)
Initiative Measure 673	A measure adding additional regulations on the health insurance industry	Failed	521,161 (32.39%)	1,087,903 (67.61%)
Initiative Measure 676	A measure requiring trigger locks on handguns and implementing a system of handgun licensing	Failed	496,690 (29.38%)	1,194,004 (70.62%)
Initiative Measure 677	A measure prohibiting employment discrimination on the basis of sexuality	Failed	666,073 (40.34%)	985,169 (59.66%)
Initiative Measure 678	A measure licensing dental hygienists to perform certain services without the supervision of a dentist	Failed	787,607 (47.13%)	883,488 (52.87%)
Initiative Measure 685	A measure decriminalizing medical marijuana use and prescribing treatment, education, and community service for non-violent drug offenders	Failed	659,244 (39.57%)	1,006,964 (60.43%)
Referendum Bill 47	An amendment allowing assessors to adjust property valuations where value increased due to the real estate market	Passed	1,009,309 (63.52%)	579,620 (36.48%)
House Joint Resolution 4208	An amendment permitting school district tax levies to run for up to four years	Passed	858,777 (53.08%)	759,259 (46.92%)
House Joint Resolution 4209	An amendment permitting local governments to make loans for improvements to stormwater and sewer services	Passed	1,002,382 (63.62%)	573,083 (36.38%)

=== 1998 ===
Ballot Measures from 1998
Measure name	Description	Status	Yes votes	No votes
Initiative Measure 688	A measure increasing the minimum wage to $6.50, with annual increases to adjust for inflation (equivalent to $13 in 2025)	Passed	1,259,470 (66.10%)	644,764 (33.90%)
Initiative Measure 692	A measure decriminalizing medical marijuana use for patients with terminal or debilitating conditions	Passed	1,121,851 (58.97%)	780,631 (41.03%)
Initiative Measure 694	A measure outlawing partial-birth abortion except when necessary to prevent the mother's death	Failed	802,376 (42.90%)	1,070,360 (57.1%)
Referendum Bill 49	A measure reducing vehicle excise taxes and authorizing $1.9 billion in funding for state and local highways (equivalent to $3.753×10^{9} in 2025)	Passed	1,056,786 (57.14%)	792,783 (42.86%)
Initiative Measure 200	A measure prohibiting government from discriminating or granting preferential treatment based on race, sex, color, ethnicity or national origin in public employment, education, and contracting	Passed	1,099,410 (58.22%)	788,930 (41.78%)

=== 1999 ===
Ballot Measures from 1999
Measure name	Description	Status	Yes votes	No votes
Initiative Measure 695	A measure lowering motor vehicle excise taxes to $30 a year, requiring voter approval for any tax increase, and repealing existing vehicle taxes (equivalent to $60 in 2025)	Passed (Note: Overturned in 2000 by Amalgamated Transit Union Local 587 v. State of Washington)	992,715 (56.16%)	775,054 (43.84%)
Initiative Measure 696	A measure outlawing commercial net, troll, and trawl fishing, with an exception for tribal fisheries	Failed	682,380 (39.51%)	1,044,872 (60.49%)
Senate Joint Resolution 21	An amendment removing all restriction on non-citizen land ownership within the state	Passed	984,122 (60.29%)	648,262 (39.71%)
Senate Joint Resolution 8208	An amendment permitting the state to invest the Emergency Reserve Fund	Failed	798,756 (49.05%)	829,637 (50.95%)

== 2000–present ==
=== 2000 ===
Ballot Measures from 2000
Measure name	Description	Status	Yes votes	No votes
Initiative Measure 713	A measure outlawing certain body-gripping animal traps and the poisoning of animals with sodium fluoroacetate or sodium cyanide	Passed	1,315,903 (54.61%)	1,093,587 (45.39%)
Initiative Measure 722	A measure repealing tax increases passed in 1999, exempting vehicles from property taxes, and limiting annual property tax increases to 2%	Passed	1,295,391 (55.89%)	1,022,349 (44.11%)
Initiative Measure 728	A measure reducing class sizes, extending learning programs, expanding teacher training, and constructing school facilities	Passed	1,714,485 (71.73%)	675,635 (28.27%)
Initiative Measure 729	A measure authorizing charter schools	Failed	1,125,766 (48.17%)	1,211,390 (51.83%)
Initiative Measure 732	A measure providing public school teachers with an annual cost-of-living salary increase	Passed	1,501,261 (62.29%)	893,601 (37.31%)
Initiative Measure 745	A measure earmarking 90% of transportation funds for roads and exempting road construction and maintenance from sales tax	Failed	955,329 (40.66%)	1,394,387 (59.34%)
Senate Joint Resolution 8214	An amendment removing limitations on trust fund investment	Passed	1,450,749 (64.85%)	786,185 (35.15%)

=== 2001 ===
Ballot Measures from 2001
Measure name	Description	Status	Yes votes	No votes
Initiative Measure 747	A measure limiting annual property tax increases to 1% unless approved by the voters	Passed (Note: Overturned by the Supreme Court in 2007)	826,258 (57.60%)	609,266 (42.40%)
Initiative Measure 773	A measure imposing additional taxes on cigarettes and wholesale tobacco products, to be spent on expanded health care services for low-income persons	Passed	948,529 (66.10%)	486,912 (33.90%)
Initiative Measure 775	A measure creating a Home Care Quality Authority to regulate home care of the elderly and disabled	Passed	880,523 (62.80%)	522,848 (37.20%)
Senate Joint Resolution 8208	An amendment allowing superior courts to bring in judges from lower courts to hear certain cases	Passed	976,417 (71.18%)	395,324 (28.82%)
House Joint Resolution 4202	An amendment permitting the state legislature to determine which investments to allow the state to fund	Failed	573,878 (42.97%)	761,768 (57.03%)

=== 2002 ===
Ballot Measures from 2002
Measure name	Description	Status	Yes votes	No votes
Initiative Measure 776	A measure setting license tab fees at $30 a year for motor vehicles and repealing some other vehicle-related taxes	Passed (Note: Temporarily overturned in 2003 by a King County Superior Court judge, but reinstated by the Supreme Court that year.)	901,478 (51.47%)	849,986 (48.53%)
Initiative Measure 790	A measure placing management of the law enforcement officers and firefighters' retirement system in a board of trustees	Passed	903,113 (53.02%)	800,105 (46.98%)
Referendum Measure 53	A measure establishing new employer rate classes and increasing some taxable wage bases	Failed	665,760 (40.78%)	966,901 (59.22%)
Referendum Bill 51	A measure increasing fuel excise taxes, sales tax on vehicles, and weight fees on trucks to fund improvements in transportation infrastructure	Failed	674,724 (38.44%)	1,080,580 (61.56%)
House Joint Resolution 4220	An amendment restricting the number of years excess levies by fire protection districts can be made	Passed	1,173,499 (70.20%)	498,145 (29.80%)

=== 2003 ===
Ballot Measures from 2003
Measure name	Description	Status	Yes votes	No votes
Initiative Measure 841	A measure repealing existing state ergonomics regulations and prohibiting the adoption of new regulations until a uniform federal standard is required	Passed	656,737 (53.49%)	570,980 (46.51%)
House Joint Resolution 4206	An amendment permitting newly elected office holders to take office early if a vacancy arises	Passed	1,008,710 (82.90%)	207,720 (17.08%)

=== 2004 ===
Ballot Measures from 2004
Measure name	Description	Status	Yes votes	No votes
Initiative Measure 872	A measure enacting a top-two primary system in which the two candidates with the most votes advance to the general election regardless of party	Passed	1,632,225 (59.85%)	1,095,190 (40.15%)
Initiative Measure 884	A measure increasing the state sales tax by 1% to create an education trust fund	Failed	1,102,996 (40.01%)	1,654,112 (59.99%)
Initiative Measure 892	A measure authorizing slot machines in non-tribal gaming establishments, with part of the tax revenue raised from this being used to reduce property tax	Failed	1,069,414 (38.45%)	1,711,785 (61.55%)
Referendum Measure 55	A measure authorizing public charter schools	Failed	1,122,964 (41.70%)	1,572,203 (58.30%)
Initiative Measure 297	A measure requiring cleanup of hazardous waste before additional waste is added, prioritizing cleanup, and providing for public participation and enforcement through citizen lawsuits	Passed	1,812,581 (69.09%)	810,795 (31.01%)

=== 2005 ===
Ballot Measures from 2005
Measure name	Description	Status	Yes votes	No votes
Initiative Measure 900	A measure expanding the power of the state auditor to conduct performance audits	Passed	994,757 (56.40%)	767,844 (43.60%)
Initiative Measure 901	A measure prohibiting smoking in buildings and vehicles open to the public, including areas within 25 feet (7.6 m) of doorways and ventilation openings	Passed	1,153,353 (63.25%)	670,225 (36.75%)
Initiative Measure 912	A measure repealing a fuel tax increase passed by the legislature	Failed	823,366 (45.38%)	991,196 (54.62%)
Initiative Measure 330	A measure limiting non-economic damages in medical malpractice suits to $350,000 and limiting attorney fees	Failed	783,435 (43.30%)	1,027,117 (56.70%)
Initiative Measure 336	A measure establishing new restrictions on medical malpractice suits and insurance provider licensing	Failed	711,443 (39.78%)	1,076,918 (60.22%)
Senate Joint Resolution 8207	An amendment modifying the judge classification system	Passed	1,102,192 (67.55%)	529,586 (32.45%)

=== 2006 ===
Ballot Measures from 2006
Measure name	Description	Status	Yes votes	No votes
Initiative Measure 920	A measure repealing estate taxes and ending funding for the education legacy trust fund	Failed	778,047 (38.20%)	1,258,110 (61.80%)
Initiative Measure 933	A measure compensating property owners when regulations damage the use or value of their property	Failed	839,992 (41.20%)	1,199,679 (58.80%)
Initiative Measure 937	A measure requiring large electric utilities to increase energy conservation and renewable energy use	Passed	1,042,679 (51.73%)	972,747 (48.27%)
House Joint Resolution 4223	An amendment empowering the legislature to increase the maximum personal property tax exemption from $3,000 to $15,000	Passed	1,581,373 (79.82%)	399,684 (20.17%)

=== 2007 ===
Ballot Measures from 2007
Measure name	Description	Status	Yes votes	No votes
Initiative Measure 960	A measure requiring a supermajority in the legislature to raise taxes and fees	Passed (Note: Partly overturned in 2013 by League of Educ. Voters v. State)	816,792 (51.24%)	777,125 (48.76%)
Referendum Measure 67	A measure allowing consumers to collect triple damages from their insurance company for unreasonably denied claims	Passed	910,598 (56.70%)	695,326 (43.30%)
Engrossed Substitute Senate Joint Resolution 8206	An amendment requiring the state to transfer 1% of annual revenue to a budget stabilization account	Passed	1,048,562 (67.74%)	499,292 (32.26%)
Senate Joint Resolution 8212	An amendment allowing inmate labor programs to be used by private businesses	Passed	937,557 (60.71%)	606,863 (39.29%)
Substitute House Joint Resolution 4204	An amendment eliminating supermajority approval requirements for school district property tax levies	Passed	811,507 (50.61%)	792,010 (49.39%)
Substitute House Joint Resolution 4215	An amendment empowering the legislature to decide what investments would be permitted for higher education funds	Passed	831,669 (54.45%)	695,663 (45.55%)

=== 2008 ===
Ballot Measures from 2008
Measure name	Description	Status	Yes votes	No votes
Initiative Measure 985	A measure opening high-occupancy vehicle lanes to all traffic during specific hours, requiring traffic light synchronization, increasing roadside assistance funding, and dedicating some taxes to traffic-flow purposes	Failed	1,163,216 (40.01%)	1,744,156 (59.99%)
Initiative Measure 1000	A measure legalizing assisted suicide for mentally competent, terminally ill adults	Passed	1,715,219 (57.82%)	1,251,255 (42.18%)
Initiative Measure 1029	A measure requiring people who work with the elderly and disabled to receive certification	Passed	2,113,773 (72.53%)	800,733 (27.47%)

=== 2009 ===
Ballot Measures from 2009
Measure name	Description	Status	Yes votes	No votes
Initiative Measure 1033	A measure limiting the growth rate of state, county, and city revenue to annual inflation and population growth	Failed	434,051 (44.62%)	538,768 (55.38%)
Referendum Measure 71	A measure recognizing long-term same-sex partners to have the same rights as married spouses (without recognizing them as married)	Passed	951,822 (53.15%)	838,842 (46.85%)

=== 2010 ===
Ballot Measures from 2010
Measure name	Description	Status	Yes votes	No votes
Initiative Measure 1053	A measure requiring that legislative action to raise taxes without a vote of the people require a supermajority vote	Passed (Note: Overturned in 2013 by League of Educ. Voters v. State)	1,571,655 (63.75%)	895,833 (36.25%)
Initiative Measure 1082	A measure privatizing workers compensation insurance in the state	Failed	991,153 (40.91%)	1,431,516 (59.09%)
Initiative Measure 1098	A measure creating a state income tax for people making above $200,000 a year and reducing statewide property tax	Failed	903,319 (35.85%)	1,616,273 (64.15%)
Initiative Measure 1100	A measure closing state-run liquor stores and legalizing the sale and distribution of alcohol by private businesses	Failed	1,175,302 (46.57%)	1,348,213 (53.43%)
Initiative Measure 1105	A measure closing all state liquor stores, licensing private parties to sell and distribute alcohol, and revising some laws dealing with alcohol taxation	Failed	878,687 (34.96%)	1,634,516 (65.04%)
Initiative Measure 1107	A measure repealing taxes on candy, bottled water, and soda	Passed	1,522,658 (60.44%)	996,761 (39.56%)
Referendum Bill 52	A measure authorizing $500 million in funding for public school and government building renovations	Failed	1,139,527 (46.23%)	1,325,253 (53.77%)
Senate Joint Resolution 8225	An amendment redefining "interest" in the Washington Constitution	Passed	1,180,552 (52.01%)	1,089,100 (47.99%)
House Joint Resolution 4220	An amendment authorizing judges to deny bail if they deem the public to be at risk	Passed	2,082,465 (84.62%)	378,634 (15.48%)

=== 2011 ===
Ballot Measures from 2011
Measure name	Description	Status	Yes votes	No votes
Initiative Measure 1125	A measure restricting toll rate tax uses and increases	Failed	878,923 (46.79%)	999,484 (53.21%)
Initiative Measure 1163	A measure requiring long-term care workers receive background checks, training, and meet certification requirements	Passed	1,222,019 (65.02%)	657,470 (34.98%)
Initiative Measure 1183	A measure closing all state-run liquor stores and allowing private businesses to sell alcohol	Passed	1,128,904 (58.74%)	793,026 (41.26%)
Senate Joint Resolution 8205	An amendment modifying the length of time a voter must have resided in Washington before voting in a presidential election	Passed	1,335,039 (73.13%)	490,445 (26.87%)
Senate Joint Resolution 8206	An amendment requiring excess funds from revenue growth be transferred to the budget stabilization account	Passed	1,186,069 (66.60%)	594,687 (33.40%)

=== 2012 ===
Ballot Measures from 2012
Measure name	Description	Status	Yes votes	No votes
Initiative Measure 1185	A measure requiring that legislative action to raise taxes without a vote of the people require a supermajority vote	Passed (Note: Overturned in 2013 by League of Educ. Voters v. State)	1,892,969 (63.91%)	1,069,083 (36.09%)
Initiative Measure 1240	A measure establishing a public charter school system not to exceed forty schools over the next five years	Passed	1,525,807 (50.69%)	1,484,125 (49.31%)
Referendum Measure 74	A measure legalizing same-sex marriage	Passed	1,659,915 (53.70%)	1,431,285 (46.30%)
Initiative Measure 502	A measure legalizing, taxing, and regulating marijuana	Passed	1,724,209 (55.70%)	1,371,235 (44.30%)
Senate Joint Resolution 8221	An amendment implementing changes in the use of state bond debt	Passed	1,748,436 (62.91%)	1,031,039 (37.09%)
Senate Joint Resolution 8223	An amendment allowing state research universities to invest funds	Failed	1,258,969 (43.99%)	1,602,785 (56.01%)

=== 2013 ===
Ballot Measures from 2013
Measure name	Description	Status	Yes votes	No votes
Initiative Measure 517	A measure implementing criminal penalties for interfering with or retaliating against petition drive efforts	Failed	629,584 (37.29%)	1,058,572 (62.71%)
Initiative Measure 522	A measure requiring foods that contain genetically modified organisms to be labeled as such	Failed	857,511 (48.91%)	895,557 (51.09%)

=== 2014 ===
Ballot Measures from 2014
Measure name	Description	Status	Yes votes	No votes
Initiative Measure 594	A measure requiring background checks for every purchase of a firearm, including private sales	Passed	1,242,734 (59.27%)	853,990 (40.73%)
Initiative Measure 591	A measure preventing the government from implementing background checks on firearm sales unless a federal standard is established	Failed	929,220 (44.73%)	1,147,966 (55.27%)
Initiative Measure 1351	A measure reducing class sizes in public schools	Passed	1,052,519 (50.96%)	1,012,958 (49.04%)

=== 2015 ===
Ballot Measures from 2015
Measure name	Description	Status	Yes votes	No votes
Initiative Measure 1366	A measure to reduce the state sales tax rate by 1% unless the legislature reaches a supermajority to determine how tax increases are approved	Passed (Note: Overturned in 2016 by Huff v. Wyman)	760,518 (51.52%)	715,684 (48.48%)
Initiative Measure 1401	A measure increasing the penalties for trafficking in endangered animal species	Passed	1,043,773 (70.29%)	441,170 (29.71%)

=== 2016 ===
Ballot Measures from 2016
Measure name	Description	Status	Yes votes	No votes
Initiative Measure 732	A measure to impose a carbon tax on the sale or use of fossil fuels and associated electricity	Failed	1,265,123 (40.75%)	1,839,414 (59.25%)
Initiative Measure 735	A measure to urge the Washington state congressional delegation to propose a federal constitutional amendment reserving constitutional rights for people, not corporations	Passed	1,923,489 (62.82%)	1,138,453 (37.18%)
Initiative Measure 1433	A measure increasing the minimum wage to $13.50 and requiring employers offer paid sick leave	Passed	1,848,583 (57.42%)	1,370,907 (42.58%)
Initiative Measure 1464	A measure creating a public campaign financing system	Failed	1,415,798 (46.29%)	1,642,784 (53.71%)
Initiative Measure 1491	A measure authorizing courts to remove individuals' access to firearms if they posed an immediate threat to themselves or others	Passed	2,234,799 (69.39%)	985,658 (30.61%)
Initiative Measure 1501	A measure increasing the criminal penalties for identity theft	Passed	2,247,906 (70.64%)	934,365 (29.36%)
Senate Joint Resolution 8210	An amendment requiring the state redistricting commission complete redistricting by November 15 of each year ending in a one	Passed	2,246,030 (77.32%)	658,927 (22.68%)

=== 2018 ===
Ballot Measures from 2018
Measure name	Description	Status	Yes votes	No votes
Initiative Measure 940	A measure requiring additional police training in de-escalation, mental health, and first aid	Passed	1,834,579 (59.60%)	1,243,316 (40.40%)
Initiative Measure 1631	A measure implementing a carbon fee, with revenue generated being used to fund greenhouse gas reduction initiatives	Failed	1,340,725 (43.44%)	1,745,703 (56.56%)
Initiative Measure 1634	A measure restricting local governments from enacting taxes on groceries, including a sugary drink tax	Passed	1,721,487 (55.88%)	1,359,240 (44.12%)
Initiative Measure 1639	A measure raising the minimum age to purchase a semiautomatic assault weapon to 21, adding background checks, waiting periods, and enacting storage requirements	Passed	1,839,475 (59.35%)	1,259,681 (40.65%)

=== 2019 ===
Ballot Measures from 2019
Measure name	Description	Status	Yes votes	No votes
Referendum Measure 88	A measure allowing the state to implement affirmative action policies in public employment, education, and contracting	Failed	952,053 (49.44%)	973,610 (50.56%)
Initiative Measure 976	A measure reducing motor vehicle registration fees and cutting transportation funding	Passed (Note: Overturned in 2020 by Garfield County Transp. Auth. et al v. State et al.)	1,055,749 (52.99%)	936,751 (47.01%)
Senate Joint Resolution 8200	An amendment allowing the legislature to pass bills detailing the succession of power during an emergency	Passed	1,247,265 (65.05%)	670,086 (34.95%)

=== 2020 ===
Ballot Measures from 2020
Measure name	Description	Status	Yes votes	No votes
Referendum Measure 90	A measure requiring public schools to provide comprehensive sex education for all students	Passed	2,283,630 (57.82%)	1,665,906 (42.18%)
Senate Joint Resolution 8212	An amendment allowing the state legislature to invest the Long-Term Care Services and Supports Trust Account into stocks	Failed	1,738,080 (45.64%)	2,069,809 (54.36%)

=== 2024 ===
Ballot Measures from 2024
Measure name	Description	Status	Yes votes	No votes
Initiative 2066	A measure prohibiting local jurisdictions from restricting access to, penalizing the use of, or incentivizing the termination of natural gas services.	Passed (Note: Overturned in 2026 by Climate Solutions et al v. State of Washington.)	1,941,474 (51.71%)	1,813,169 (48.29%)
Initiative 2109	A measure repealing Senate Bill 5096, which created a capital gains tax in Washington.	Failed	1,364,510 (35.89%)	2,437,419 (64.11%)
Initiative 2117	A measure prohibiting the state government from creating any form of carbon credit program and repealing the Washington Climate Commitment Act.	Failed	1,437,103 (38.05%)	2,340,077 (61.95%)
Initiative 2124	A measure allowing state residents to opt out of the WA Cares welfare program.	Failed	1,668,435 (44.54%)	2,077,216 (55.46%)

=== 2026 ===
Ballot Measures from 2024
Measure name	Description	Status	Yes votes	No votes
Initiative IL26-001	A measure requiring schools to notify parents of medical care provided to their children, repealing certain rights of students, and implementing parental review of curriculum.	Election scheduled for November 3, 2026		
Initiative IP26-645	A measure repealing the millionaires tax and prohibiting future income taxes.	Election scheduled for November 3, 2026		
Initiative IL26-638	A measure prohibiting transgender girls from participating in boys sports and requiring sex verification for female student athletes.	Election scheduled for November 3, 2026		

== See also ==
- Law of Washington (state)
