= 2019 United States ballot measures =

- March 30 to November 5, 2019

Part of the 2019 United States elections

A total of 36 ballot measures were placed on statewide ballots in 2019 across the United States while an additional ballot measure was placed on the ballot of the U.S. Virgin Islands.

Measures are included whether they are initiated by a state legislature or by the citizens of said state. Subheadings are included under a state if there was a measure that was held on a different date with the subheading being the date of the ballot measures.

Results for each measure are included the "Results" heading and not under headings for each state with only whether they passed or not being included.

== By state ==
=== Colorado ===
Origin	Status	Measure	Description (Result of a "yes" vote)	Date	Yes	No
Legislature	Failed	Colorado Proposition CC, Retain Revenue for Transportation and Education TABOR Measure	Allow the state to retain revenue above the state spending cap to provide funding for transportation and education.	Nov 5	724,060; 46.34%	838,282; 53.66%
Legislature	Approved	Colorado Proposition DD, Legalize Sports Betting with Tax Revenue for Water Projects Measure	Authorize sports betting in Colorado and authorize the legislature to levy a tax of 10% on those conducting sports betting operations and use revenue to fund state water projects.	Nov 5	800,745; 51.41%	756,712; 48.59%

=== Kansas ===
Origin	Status	Measure	Description (Result of a "yes" vote)	Date	Yes	No
Legislature	Approved	Kansas Eliminate Revision of Census Population Amendment	End the state's practice of adjusting the U.S. Census population regarding military personnel and students when redistricting the Kansas State Legislature.	Nov 5	203,572; 59.69%	137,483; 40.31%

=== Kansas ===
Origin	Status	Measure	Description (Result of a "yes" vote)	Date	Yes	No
Legislature	Failed	Louisiana Amendment 1, Property Tax Exemption for Stored Materials Routed for Outer Continental Shelf Amendment	Extend an ad valorem tax exemption to property being stored in Louisiana but destined for the Outer Continental Shelf.	Oct 12	575,542; 47.25%	642,508; 52.75%
Legislature	Approved	Louisiana Amendment 2, Education Excellence Fund Uses Amendment	Allow for appropriations from the Education Excellence Fund to the Louisiana Educational Television Authority, Thrive Academy, and laboratory schools operated by public colleges.	Oct 12	612,257; 50.39%	602,745; 49.61%
Legislature	Approved	Louisiana Amendment 3, Board of Tax Appeals Jurisdiction Amendment	Allow the legislature through a two-thirds vote to give the Louisiana Board of Tax Appeals jurisdiction over the constitutionality of taxes, fees, and related matters; require prompt recovery by taxpayers of any unconstitutional tax paid; establish authority for the board in the state constitution, subject to changes made by laws passed by a two-thirds vote in the legislature; state in the constitution that the Louisiana Board of Tax Appeals has jurisdiction over any disputes concerning state and local taxes, fees, or other claims against the state.	Oct 12	700,217; 57.88%	509,530; 42.12%
Legislature	Failed	Louisiana Amendment 4, New Orleans Affordable Housing Property Tax Exemption Amendment	Allow New Orleans, Louisiana, to exempt properties with no more than 15 residential units from taxes for the purpose of, according to the amendment, promoting and encouraging affordable housing.	Oct 12	442,998; 36.51%	770,395; 63.49%

=== Maine ===
Origin	Status	Measure	Description (Result of a "yes" vote)	Date	Yes	No
Bond Issue	Approved	Maine Question 1, Transportation Infrastructure Bond Issue	Authorize $105 million in general obligation bonds for transportation infrastructure projects.	Nov 5	143,315; 76.27%	44,589; 23.73%
Legislature	Approved	Maine Question 2, Allow for Alternative Initiative Signatures for Persons with Disabilities Amendment	Authorize legislation allowing for persons with physical disabilities that prevent them from signing their own names to use an alternative signature to sign petitions for citizen-initiated ballot measures.	Nov 5	141,162; 75.50%	45,799; 24.50%

=== New Jersey ===
Origin	Status	Measure	Description (Result of a "yes" vote)	Date	Yes	No
Legislature	Approved	New Jersey Public Question 1, Property Tax Deduction for Veterans Extended to Continuing Care Retirement Communities Amendment	Extend the $250 property tax deduction that veterans receive to continuing care retirement centers on behalf of the veterans living there and require the retirement centers to pass the value of the deduction on to veterans in the form of credits or payments.	Nov 5	918,077; 75.96%	290,529; 24.04%

=== Pennsylvania ===
Origin	Status	Measure	Description (Result of a "yes" vote)	Date	Yes	No
Legislature	Approved	Pennsylvania Marsy's Law Crime Victims Rights Amendment	Add specific rights of crime victims, together known as a Marsy's Law, to the Pennsylvania Constitution.	Nov 5	1,765,384; 74.01%	620,104; 25.99%

=== Texas ===
Origin	Status	Measure	Description (Result of a "yes" vote)	Date	Yes	No
Legislature	Failed	Texas Proposition 1, Allowed to Serve as Multiple Municipal Judges Amendment	Allow persons to hold more than one office as an elected or appointed municipal judge in more than one municipality at the same time.	Nov 5	685,827; 34.56%	1,298,866; 65.44%
Legislature	Approved	Texas Proposition 2, Water Development Board Bonds Amendment	Allow the Texas Water Development Board to issue bonds on a continuing basis, but not exceeding $200 million in total principal at any time, for water supply and sewer service in areas defined as economically distressed.	Nov 5	1,294,936; 65.65%	677,619; 34.35%
Legislature	Approved	Texas Proposition 3, Temporary Property Tax Exemption for Disaster Areas Amendment	Require political subdivisions to provide temporary property tax exemptions in areas that the governor declared as disaster areas.	Nov 5	1,679,049; 85.09%	294,235; 14.91%
Legislature	Approved	Texas Proposition 4, Prohibit State Income Tax on Individuals Amendment	Add an amendment prohibiting the state from levying an income tax on individuals to the Texas Constitution, which requires a two-thirds legislative vote and a statewide referendum to amend.	Nov 5	1,477,373; 74.35%	509,547; 25.65%
Legislature	Approved	Texas Proposition 5, Sales Tax on Sporting Goods Dedicated to Parks, Wildlife, and Historical Agencies Amendment	Dedicate revenue from the sales tax on sporting goods to the Texas Parks and Wildlife Department and the Texas Historical Commission.	Nov 5	1,745,353; 88.02%	237,656; 11.98%
Legislature	Approved	Texas Proposition 6, Cancer Prevention and Research Institute Bonds Amendment	Allow the legislature to increase the maximum amount of bonds for the Cancer Prevention and Research Institute of Texas from $3 billion to $6 billion.	Nov 5	1,259,398; 64.02%	707,939; 35.98%
Legislature	Approved	Texas Proposition 7, Increase Distributions to School Fund Amendment	Allow the General Land Office and State Board of Education to each transfer $600 million from the Permanent School Fund's lands and properties proceeds to the Available School Fund each year.	Nov 5	1,459,578; 74.12%	509,590; 25.88%
Legislature	Approved	Texas Proposition 8, Flood Infrastructure Fund Amendment	Create the Flood Infrastructure Fund, which the Texas Water Development Board would use to provide financing for flood drainage, mitigation, and control projects.	Nov 5	1,538,726; 77.87%	437,384; 22.13%
Legislature	Approved	Texas Proposition 9, Precious Metals in Depositories Exempt from Property Tax Amendment	Allow the legislature to exempt precious metals held in a precious metal depository from property taxation.	Nov 5	982,881; 51.30%	932,885; 48.70%
Legislature	Approved	Texas Proposition 10, Transfer of Care of Law Enforcement Animals Amendment	Allow for the transfer of a law enforcement animal, such as a dog or horse, to the animal's handler or another qualified caretaker if the transfer is in the animal's best interest.	Nov 5	1,858,876; 93.76%	123,648; 6.24%

=== Washington ===
Origin	Status	Measure	Description (Result of a "yes" vote)	Date	Yes	No
Veto Referendum	Failed	Washington Referendum 88, Vote on I-1000 Affirmative Action Measure	Allow Initiative 1000 to go into effect, thereby expressly allowing the state to implement affirmative action policies without the use of preferential treatment (as defined) or quotas (as defined) in public employment, education, and contracting.	Nov 5	952,053; 49.44%	973,610; 50.56%
Citizens	Approved	Washington Initiative 976, Limits on Motor Vehicle Taxes and Fees Measure	Limit annual license fees for vehicles weighing under 10,000 pounds at $30 except voter-approved charges; Base vehicle taxes on the Kelley Blue Book value rather than 85% of the manufacturer's base suggested retail price; and Repeal authorization for certain regional transit authorities, such as Sound Transit, to impose motor vehicle excise taxes.	Nov 5	1,055,749; 52.99%	936,751; 47.01%
Legislature	Approved	Washington Senate Joint Resolution 8200, Government Continuation Legislation for Catastrophic Incidents Amendment	Authorize the Washington State Legislature to pass bills addressing the succession of powers and duties of public offices during periods of catastrophic incidents that are considered emergencies.	Nov 5	1,247,265; 65.05%	670,086; 34.95%
Advisory Question	Failed	Washington Advisory Vote 20, Nonbinding Question on Tax to Fund Long-Term Healthcare Services	Advise the legislature to maintain House Bill 1087, which was designed to levy 0.58% tax on wages to fund a program for long-term healthcare services.	Nov 5	683,870; 37.08%	1,160,463; 62.92%
Advisory Question	Failed	Washington Advisory Vote 21, Nonbinding Question on Extending Tax and Surcharge on Timber Products	Advise the legislature to maintain House Bill 1324, which was designed to extend a surcharge on timber products through July 2045 that was otherwise set to expire in June 2024.	Nov 5	763,429; 41.10%	1,094,028; 58.90%
Advisory Question	Failed	Washington Advisory Vote 22, Nonbinding Question on Paint Tax to Fund Paint Waste Management Programs	Advise the legislature to maintain House Bill 1652, which was designed to require producers of interior or exterior architectural paint sold in containers of 5 gallons or less to fund and take part in programs related to paint waste management.	Nov 5	700,391; 37.97%	1,144,394; 62.03%
Advisory Question	Approved	Washington Advisory Vote 23, Nonbinding Question on E-Cigarette and Vapor Product Tax	Advise the legislature to maintain House Bill 1873, which was designed to levy a tax on e-cigarettes and vapor products.	Nov 5	1,256,542; 66.91%	621,440; 33.09%
Advisory Question	Failed	Washington Advisory Vote 24, Nonbinding Question on Business Activities Tax to Fund Higher Education Programs	Advise the legislature to maintain House Bill 2158, which was designed to create the Workforce Education Investment Account to fund higher education programs through a tax on certain business activities.	Nov 5	680,183; 37.35%	1,140,727; 62.65%
Advisory Question	Failed	Washington Advisory Vote 25, Nonbinding Question Concerning a Tax on Certain Financial Institutions	Advise the legislature to maintain House Bill 2167, which was designed to impose an additional tax on certain financial institutions.	Nov 5	816,936; 44.62%	1,013,783; 55.38%
Advisory Question	Failed	Washington Advisory Vote 26, Nonbinding Question on Online Retail Sales Tax	Advise the legislature to maintain Senate Bill 5581, which was designed to apply retail sales taxes on online retailers.	Nov 5	818,192; 44.77%	1,009,275; 55.23%
Advisory Question	Failed	Washington Advisory Vote 27, Nonbinding Question on Petroleum Product Tax	Advise the legislature to maintain Senate Bill 5993, which was designed to increase taxes on petroleum products.	Nov 5	728,566; 39.22%	1,129,203; 60.78%
Advisory Question	Approved	Washington Advisory Vote 28, Nonbinding Question on Limiting Sales Tax Exemptions for Nonresidents	Advise the legislature to maintain Senate Bill 5997, which was designed to limit the tax exemptions that residents from other U.S. states and Canada can receive while in Washington.	Nov 5	1,012,991; 55.29%	819,232; 44.71%
Advisory Question	Failed	Washington Advisory Vote 29, Nonbinding Question Concerning an Excise Tax on Real Property	Advise the legislature to maintain Senate Bill 5998, which was designed to increase the excise tax on real property.	Nov 5	645,358; 35.20%	1,188,272; 64.80%
Advisory Question	Failed	Washington Advisory Vote 30, Nonbinding Question Concerning a Tax Increase on Tour Operators and Travel Agents	Advise the legislature to maintain Senate Bill 6004, which was designed to increase the business and occupation tax on specified tour operators and travel agents.	Nov 5	809,164; 44.19%	1,021,792; 55.81%
Advisory Question	Approved	Washington Advisory Vote 31, Nonbinding Question on an International Investment Management Services Tax Increase	Advise the legislature to maintain Senate Bill 6016, which was designed to increase the business and occupation tax on specified international investment management services.	Nov 5	1,039,887; 56.75%	792,401; 43.25%

== Other jurisdictions ==
=== U.S. Virgin Islands ===
Origin	Status	Measure	Description (Result of a "yes" vote)	Date	Yes	No
Citizens	Failed	U.S. Virgin Islands Legislative Apportionment Initiative	Replace the territory's two seven-member legislative districts and one at-large member with four two-member districts, one single-member district, and six at-large members.	Mar 30	3,577; 74.63%	1,216; 25.37% (Note: In order for a ballot measure in the U.S. Virgin Islands to become law, a majority of registered voters must turn out for a ballot initiative, and a majority of voters who turn out need to cast their votes in support of the initiative. As of the election, there were 51,734 registered voters in the U.S. Virgin Islands, meaning at least 25,867 needed to vote in the election. Voter turnout was at 9.3 percent; therefore, the measure failed.)
