= 2006 Washington Resolution 4223 =

2006 Constitutional amendment in the State of Washington

- November 7, 2006
- Property Tax Exemption

Results
Choice	Votes	%
Yes	1,581,373	79.82%
No	399,684	20.18%
Total votes	1,981,057	100.00%
Yes
70–80%
80–90%

House Joint Resolution 4223 was a constitutional amendment in Washington which passed the house and was approved by the voters of the state in the 2006 general election.

This amendment would authorize the legislature to increase the personal property tax exemption for taxable personal property owned by each "head of a family" from three thousand ($3,000) to fifteen thousand ($15,000) dollars.

== Results ==
2006 Washington Resolution 4223
Choice	Votes	%
For	1,581,373	79.82
Against	399,684	20.18
Total	1,981,057	100.00
Source: Washington Secretary of State

=== By county ===
County results
County	Yes		No		Margin		Total votes
County	#	%	#	%	#	%	Total votes
Adams	2,520	74.31%	871	25.69%	1,649	48.63%	3,391
Asotin	5,698	79.80%	1,442	20.20%	4,256	59.61%	7,140
Benton	40,064	83.37%	7,992	16.63%	32,072	66.74%	48,056
Chelan	18,109	81.76%	4,039	18.24%	14,070	63.53%	22,148
Clallam	23,978	82.55%	5,070	17.45%	18,908	65.09%	29,048
Clark	91,221	82.31%	19,604	17.69%	71,617	64.62%	110,825
Columbia	1,429	77.08%	425	22.92%	1,004	54.15%	1,854
Cowlitz	22,880	76.53%	7,015	23.47%	15,865	53.07%	29,895
Douglas	8,430	78.87%	2,258	21.13%	6,172	57.75%	10,688
Ferry	2,061	75.66%	663	24.34%	1,398	51.32%	2,724
Franklin	9,589	78.10%	2,689	21.90%	6,900	56.20%	12,278
Garfield	891	77.14%	264	22.86%	627	54.29%	1,155
Grant	14,668	77.24%	4,322	22.76%	10,346	54.48%	18,990
Grays Harbor	15,883	74.05%	5,565	25.95%	10,318	48.11%	21,448
Island	24,127	83.90%	4,630	16.10%	19,497	67.80%	28,757
Jefferson	13,162	85.51%	2,230	14.49%	10,932	71.02%	15,392
King	487,235	81.71%	109,093	18.29%	378,142	63.41%	596,328
Kitsap	68,640	79.22%	18,005	20.78%	50,635	58.44%	86,645
Kittitas	9,451	79.53%	2,432	20.47%	7,019	59.07%	11,883
Klickitat	5,963	82.90%	1,230	17.10%	4,733	65.80%	7,193
Lewis	19,467	79.49%	5,024	20.51%	14,443	58.97%	24,491
Lincoln	3,587	77.96%	1,014	22.04%	2,573	55.92%	4,601
Mason	16,338	79.45%	4,226	20.55%	12,112	58.90%	20,564
Okanogan	10,003	80.77%	2,382	19.23%	7,621	61.53%	12,385
Pacific	6,568	79.12%	1,733	20.88%	4,835	58.25%	8,301
Pend Oreille	3,953	79.23%	1,036	20.77%	2,917	58.47%	4,989
Pierce	148,484	73.96%	52,281	26.04%	96,203	47.92%	200,765
San Juan	6,836	86.96%	1,025	13.04%	5,811	73.92%	7,861
Skagit	31,003	79.84%	7,830	20.16%	23,173	59.67%	38,833
Skamania	3,062	79.16%	806	20.84%	2,256	58.32%	3,868
Snohomish	155,529	79.19%	40,872	20.81%	114,657	58.38%	196,401
Spokane	113,668	78.13%	31,827	21.87%	81,841	56.25%	145,495
Stevens	13,270	80.24%	3,268	19.76%	10,002	60.48%	16,538
Thurston	65,610	81.19%	15,201	18.81%	50,409	62.38%	80,811
Wahkiakum	1,401	81.12%	326	18.88%	1,075	62.25%	1,727
Walla Walla	13,958	80.96%	3,283	19.04%	10,675	61.92%	17,241
Whatcom	52,634	80.53%	12,722	19.47%	39,912	61.07%	65,356
Whitman	9,936	79.74%	2,525	20.26%	7,411	59.47%	12,461
Yakima	40,067	76.27%	12,464	23.73%	27,603	52.55%	52,531
Totals	1,581,373	79.82%	399,684	20.18%	1,181,689	59.65%	1,981,057
