= 2007 Washington Referendum 67 =

Referendum 67
- Insurance Fair Conduct Act

Results
| Choice | Votes | % |
|---|---|---|
| Yes | 910,598 | 56.70% |
| No | 695,326 | 43.30% |
| Total votes | 1,605,924 | 100.00% |

Yes:
50–60%
60–70%
70–80%
No:
50–60%
60–70%

Referendum 67 (R-67) was a vote held in 2007 in which the people of Washington state confirmed the Insurance Fair Conduct Act. The proposed law appeared on the November 6 general election ballot in Washington, along with five other ballot measures. It passed with the support of approximately 57% of voters. After being approved by voters the Act came into force on December 6.

Referendum 67 is a 2007 citizen's referendum to ESSB 5726 in Washington state. The ballot measure is sponsored by Dana R. Bieber. The complete text of the referendum is available at the Washington Secretary of State's website.

== Results ==
Referendum 67
| Choice | Votes | % |
|---|---|---|
| For | 910,598 | 56.70 |
| Against | 695,326 | 43.30 |
| Total | 1,605,924 | 100.00 |

=== By county ===
County results
| County | Yes | | No | | Margin | | Total votes |
| County | # | % | # | % | # | % | Total votes |
|---|---|---|---|---|---|---|---|
| Adams | 1,109 | 36.56% | 1,924 | 63.44% | -815 | -26.87% | 3,033 |
| Asotin | 3,221 | 51.50% | 3,033 | 48.50% | 188 | 3.01% | 6,254 |
| Benton | 16,466 | 39.42% | 25,305 | 60.58% | -8,839 | -21.16% | 41,771 |
| Chelan | 9,192 | 49.00% | 9,566 | 51.00% | -374 | -1.99% | 18,758 |
| Clallam | 14,760 | 60.38% | 9,686 | 39.62% | 5,074 | 20.76% | 24,446 |
| Clark | 43,921 | 55.73% | 34,889 | 44.27% | 9,032 | 11.46% | 78,810 |
| Columbia | 513 | 33.08% | 1,038 | 66.92% | -525 | -33.85% | 1,551 |
| Cowlitz | 14,266 | 57.60% | 10,501 | 42.40% | 3,765 | 15.20% | 24,767 |
| Douglas | 4,194 | 47.17% | 4,697 | 52.83% | -503 | -5.66% | 8,891 |
| Ferry | 1,024 | 45.82% | 1,211 | 54.18% | -187 | -8.37% | 2,235 |
| Franklin | 3,672 | 36.83% | 6,299 | 63.17% | -2,627 | -26.35% | 9,971 |
| Garfield | 423 | 42.22% | 579 | 57.78% | -156 | -15.57% | 1,002 |
| Grant | 6,150 | 38.07% | 10,005 | 61.93% | -3,855 | -23.86% | 16,155 |
| Grays Harbor | 11,580 | 61.22% | 7,334 | 38.78% | 4,246 | 22.45% | 18,914 |
| Island | 15,367 | 61.28% | 9,708 | 38.72% | 5,659 | 22.57% | 25,075 |
| Jefferson | 8,501 | 66.70% | 4,245 | 33.30% | 4,256 | 33.39% | 12,746 |
| King | 293,476 | 64.36% | 162,517 | 35.64% | 130,959 | 28.72% | 455,993 |
| Kitsap | 41,081 | 57.78% | 30,019 | 42.22% | 11,062 | 15.56% | 71,100 |
| Kittitas | 4,694 | 46.32% | 5,439 | 53.68% | -745 | -7.35% | 10,133 |
| Klickitat | 3,369 | 54.69% | 2,791 | 45.31% | 578 | 9.38% | 6,160 |
| Lewis | 11,168 | 51.11% | 10,683 | 48.89% | 485 | 2.22% | 21,851 |
| Lincoln | 1,557 | 37.28% | 2,620 | 62.72% | -1,063 | -25.45% | 4,177 |
| Mason | 11,104 | 61.20% | 7,041 | 38.80% | 4,063 | 22.39% | 18,145 |
| Okanogan | 4,613 | 46.67% | 5,271 | 53.33% | -658 | -6.66% | 9,884 |
| Pacific | 4,182 | 59.18% | 2,885 | 40.82% | 1,297 | 18.35% | 7,067 |
| Pend Oreille | 1,976 | 45.09% | 2,406 | 54.91% | -430 | -9.81% | 4,382 |
| Pierce | 94,528 | 58.24% | 67,771 | 41.76% | 26,757 | 16.49% | 162,299 |
| San Juan | 4,162 | 64.14% | 2,327 | 35.86% | 1,835 | 28.28% | 6,489 |
| Skagit | 18,034 | 55.17% | 14,655 | 44.83% | 3,379 | 10.34% | 32,689 |
| Skamania | 1,754 | 59.18% | 1,210 | 40.82% | 544 | 18.35% | 2,964 |
| Snohomish | 98,473 | 59.05% | 68,287 | 40.95% | 30,186 | 18.10% | 166,760 |
| Spokane | 57,150 | 45.11% | 69,535 | 54.89% | -12,385 | -9.78% | 126,685 |
| Stevens | 6,089 | 43.01% | 8,068 | 56.99% | -1,979 | -13.98% | 14,157 |
| Thurston | 40,404 | 61.09% | 25,732 | 38.91% | 14,672 | 22.18% | 66,136 |
| Wahkiakum | 966 | 57.88% | 703 | 42.12% | 263 | 15.76% | 1,669 |
| Walla Walla | 5,608 | 39.83% | 8,473 | 60.17% | -2,865 | -20.35% | 14,081 |
| Whatcom | 30,369 | 57.24% | 22,682 | 42.76% | 7,687 | 14.49% | 53,051 |
| Whitman | 4,249 | 42.88% | 5,661 | 57.12% | -1,412 | -14.25% | 9,910 |
| Yakima | 17,233 | 37.66% | 28,530 | 62.34% | -11,297 | -24.69% | 45,763 |
| Totals | 910,598 | 56.70% | 695,326 | 43.30% | 215,272 | 13.40% | 1,605,924 |
