= 2006 Washington Initiative 920 =

Initiative 920
- Estate Tax Repeal

Results
Choice	Votes	%
Yes	778,047	38.21%
No	1,258,110	61.79%
County results
Yes: 50–60%	No: 50–60% 60–70%

Initiative 920 (I-920) was a highly controversial campaign to repeal the estate tax in the U.S. state of Washington. Washington state law directs that revenues collected from the estate tax be placed into the Education Legacy Trust account, which funds financial aid for higher education. The initiative failed, with 33.54 percent voting for and 66.46 percent against.

== Supporters ==
The campaign to get I-920 on the ballot was primarily bankrolled by Martin Selig, a Seattle skyscraper developer, and Dennis Falk, a wealthy former Seattle police officer. Falk's involvement has been particularly controversial. Falk leads the John Birch Society. In 1978, Falk co-chaired Save Our Moral Ethics, an unsuccessful campaign to repeal a law barring housing and employment discrimination against gays and lesbians.

Supporters of I-920 claim the estate tax is an unfair burden on small business. They claim that if small businesses leave Washington, support for local schools will be eroded. They also contend that the 2005 legislature's decision to renew the estate tax contradicted I-402, which was passed in 1981.

Groups supporting I-920 include:

- Associated Builders and Contractors of Western Washington
- Association of Washington Business (AWB)
- Centralia-Chehalis Chamber of Commerce
- D.A. Burns & Sons
- Frank Gurney, Inc.
- GM Nameplate
- Greater Seattle Chamber of Commerce

== Opponents ==
Criticism of I-920 has focused on two main points. First, critics argue that the estate tax is the most efficient way to raise revenue for education and that repealing the tax will compromise educational infrastructure, especially for the poor. Second, critics point out that the tax is graduated and therefore only impacts those most able to pay. They argue that the proponents of I-920 have used the rhetoric of small business interests to create tax breaks for the extremely wealthy. Family farms, for example, are completely exempt from the estate tax. Last year, the Washington Estate Tax affected only 250 of the wealthiest estates.

Groups opposing I-920 include:

- American Federation of Teachers of Washington
- Children's Alliance
- First Place
- International Union of Operating Engineers — Local 609
- League of Education Voters
- League of Women Voters
- Lutheran Public Policy Office of Washington State
- Martin Luther King, Jr. County Labor Council, AFL-CIO
- Pierce County Human Services Coalition
- Public School Employees of Washington
- Retired Public Employees Council of Washington
- SEIU #925
- Statewide Poverty Action Network
- Tax Right
- Washington Association of Churches
- Washington Community Action Network
- Washington Education Association
- Washington State Labor Council
- Washington State NOW
- Washington State Parent Teacher Association
- Washington Tax Fairness Coalition

== Results ==
2006 Washington Initiative 920
Choice	Votes	%
For	778,047	38.21
Against	1,258,110	61.79
Total	2,036,157	100.00
Source: Washington Secretary of State

=== By county ===
County results
County	No		Yes		Margin		Total votes
County	#	%	#	%	#	%	Total votes
Adams	1,965	57.39%	1,459	42.61%	506	14.78%	3,424
Asotin	4,665	65.46%	2,462	34.54%	2,203	30.91%	7,127
Benton	23,695	49.19%	24,471	50.81%	-776	-1.61%	48,166
Chelan	12,651	55.75%	10,043	44.25%	2,608	11.49%	22,694
Clallam	17,876	60.10%	11,867	39.90%	6,009	20.20%	29,743
Clark	59,058	53.75%	50,815	46.25%	8,243	7.50%	109,873
Columbia	1,030	55.35%	831	44.65%	199	10.69%	1,861
Cowlitz	16,316	54.92%	13,390	45.08%	2,926	9.85%	29,706
Douglas	6,208	57.05%	4,674	42.95%	1,534	14.10%	10,882
Ferry	1,547	56.38%	1,197	43.62%	350	12.76%	2,744
Franklin	5,777	46.14%	6,744	53.86%	-967	-7.72%	12,521
Garfield	718	62.93%	423	37.07%	295	25.85%	1,141
Grant	11,094	57.38%	8,241	42.62%	2,853	14.76%	19,335
Grays Harbor	14,586	66.96%	7,196	33.04%	7,390	33.93%	21,782
Island	17,714	60.32%	11,653	39.68%	6,061	20.64%	29,367
Jefferson	10,683	67.52%	5,138	32.48%	5,545	35.05%	15,821
King	411,149	66.46%	207,506	33.54%	203,643	32.92%	618,655
Kitsap	56,725	63.47%	32,645	36.53%	24,080	26.94%	89,370
Kittitas	6,334	52.73%	5,679	47.27%	655	5.45%	12,013
Klickitat	3,836	53.40%	3,348	46.60%	488	6.79%	7,184
Lewis	12,623	51.49%	11,891	48.51%	732	2.99%	24,514
Lincoln	2,865	62.54%	1,716	37.46%	1,149	25.08%	4,581
Mason	12,573	61.33%	7,928	38.67%	4,645	22.66%	20,501
Okanogan	7,410	58.95%	5,159	41.05%	2,251	17.91%	12,569
Pacific	5,176	61.41%	3,252	38.59%	1,924	22.83%	8,428
Pend Oreille	3,024	59.87%	2,027	40.13%	997	19.74%	5,051
Pierce	125,498	60.15%	83,159	39.85%	42,339	20.29%	208,657
San Juan	5,017	62.53%	3,006	37.47%	2,011	25.07%	8,023
Skagit	26,034	64.82%	14,127	35.18%	11,907	29.65%	40,161
Skamania	2,068	53.26%	1,815	46.74%	253	6.52%	3,883
Snohomish	124,468	61.46%	78,038	38.54%	46,430	22.93%	202,506
Spokane	98,931	65.36%	52,435	34.64%	46,496	30.72%	151,366
Stevens	9,779	58.61%	6,907	41.39%	2,872	17.21%	16,686
Thurston	53,861	64.89%	29,142	35.11%	24,719	29.78%	83,003
Wahkiakum	960	55.11%	782	44.89%	178	10.22%	1,742
Walla Walla	8,963	51.48%	8,449	48.52%	514	2.95%	17,412
Whatcom	41,442	61.50%	25,938	38.50%	15,504	23.01%	67,380
Whitman	8,512	66.96%	4,201	33.04%	4,311	33.91%	12,713
Yakima	25,279	47.19%	28,293	52.81%	-3,014	-5.63%	53,572
Totals	1,258,110	61.79%	778,047	38.21%	480,063	23.58%	2,036,157
