= 2019 Washington Senate Joint Resolution 8200 =

- November 5, 2019
- Extraordinary Powers Amendment

Results
Choice	Votes	%
Yes	1,247,265	65.05%
No	670,086	34.95%
Total votes	1,917,351	100.00%
Yes
70–80%
60–70%
50–60%
No
50–60%

Senate Joint Resolution 8200

Washington State Legislature
- Territorial extent: State of Washington
- Introduced by: Dean Takko

Amends
- Constitution of Washington

Related legislation
- House Joint Resolution 4200

Summary
- "Proposes a constitutional amendment to authorize the Legislature to enact measures for ensuring continuity of government operations during emergencies resulting from a catastrophic incident."

Keywords
- Continuity of government, Emergency management

Senate Joint Resolution 8200 (2019), also known as SJR 8200, is a proposed amendment to the Constitution of Washington that, if enacted, would extend to the Washington State Legislature extraordinary powers during a "catastrophic incident", including the authority to fill constitutionally-established offices in the event the entire lines of succession to those offices had been wiped out and to designate a new capital city should Olympia be rendered no longer usable. It was passed by Washington voters in the November, 2019 general election.

== Background ==
The whole of Washington abuts the Cascadia Subduction Zone. According to The New Yorker, predictive modeling of the next full rupture of the zone anticipates it would result in the "worst natural disaster in the history" of North America. The United States' Federal Emergency Management Agency predicts 40,000 casualties and the displacement of one million persons would result from a rupture.

== Amendment ==
In 2019, House Joint Resolution 4200 was passed by the Washington House of Representatives by a vote of 91–7, followed by the Senate version of the same bill - Senate Joint Resolution 8200 - by the Washington Senate in a vote of 37–11. Having achieved the minimum two-thirds required in both chambers, it moved to ratification by public referendum to be held in the scheduled general election of November 2019. It was approved on November 5, 2019.

SJR 8200 amends Article II, Section 42 of the Constitution of Washington to extend to the Washington Legislature extraordinary powers during a "catastrophic incident", including the authority to fill constitutionally-established offices in the event the entire lines of succession to those offices had been wiped out, and to designate a new capital city should Olympia be rendered no longer usable. The Constitution of Washington presently authorizes the Legislature to take similar actions in the event of an "enemy attack" against the state's territory; SJR 8200 was proposed to increase the breadth of situations in which the Legislature could take extraordinary measures to preserve government, specifically due to concerns of an exigency involving the Cascadia Subduction Zone.

Opponents of the amendment, including Senator Bob Hasegawa, have argued that its language was too broad and too vague and could be used by an abusive governor to seize sweeping powers. Supporters of the amendment, such as Senator Dean Takko, have declaimed such concerns as unrealistic.

== Results ==
Senate Joint Resolution 8200 was approved with 65% of the vote.

2019 Washington Senate Joint Resolution 8200
Choice	Votes	%
For	1,247,265	65.05
Against	670,086	34.95
Total	1,917,351	100.00
Source: Washington Secretary of State

=== By county ===
County results
County	Yes		No		Margin		Total votes
County	#	%	#	%	#	%	Total votes
Adams	1,343	48.47%	1,428	51.53%	-85	-3.07%	2,771
Asotin	3,545	57.96%	2,571	42.04%	974	15.93%	6,116
Benton	21,540	49.95%	21,581	50.05%	-41	-0.10%	43,121
Chelan	12,051	56.44%	9,299	43.56%	2,752	12.89%	21,350
Clallam	16,515	62.79%	9,789	37.21%	6,726	25.57%	26,304
Clark	61,838	61.56%	38,616	38.44%	23,222	23.12%	100,454
Columbia	707	47.26%	789	52.74%	-82	-5.48%	1,496
Cowlitz	14,790	52.40%	13,436	47.60%	1,354	4.80%	28,226
Douglas	5,260	51.98%	4,860	48.02%	400	3.95%	10,120
Ferry	1,043	43.44%	1,358	56.56%	-315	-13.12%	2,401
Franklin	5,642	46.68%	6,444	53.32%	-802	-6.64%	12,086
Garfield	485	51.21%	462	48.79%	23	2.43%	947
Grant	7,290	44.07%	9,251	55.93%	-1,961	-11.86%	16,541
Grays Harbor	10,832	55.97%	8,521	44.03%	2,311	11.94%	19,353
Island	18,633	64.49%	10,259	35.51%	8,374	28.98%	28,892
Jefferson	9,827	69.76%	4,260	30.24%	5,567	39.52%	14,087
King	465,623	76.52%	142,903	23.48%	322,720	53.03%	608,526
Kitsap	46,965	64.23%	26,154	35.77%	20,811	28.46%	73,119
Kittitas	7,144	56.02%	5,608	43.98%	1,536	12.05%	12,752
Klickitat	3,284	51.92%	3,041	48.08%	243	3.84%	6,325
Lewis	9,993	45.63%	11,908	54.37%	-1,915	-8.74%	21,901
Lincoln	1,727	43.91%	2,206	56.09%	-479	-12.18%	3,933
Mason	10,290	55.41%	8,280	44.59%	2,010	10.82%	18,570
Okanogan	5,445	51.39%	5,150	48.61%	295	2.78%	10,595
Pacific	4,153	57.81%	3,031	42.19%	1,122	15.62%	7,184
Pend Oreille	1,946	43.96%	2,481	56.04%	-535	-12.08%	4,427
Pierce	119,856	61.60%	74,708	38.40%	45,148	23.20%	194,564
San Juan	5,287	74.02%	1,856	25.98%	3,431	48.03%	7,143
Skagit	22,527	61.59%	14,051	38.41%	8,476	23.17%	36,578
Skamania	1,808	51.79%	1,683	48.21%	125	3.58%	3,491
Snohomish	119,450	62.44%	71,842	37.56%	47,608	24.89%	191,292
Spokane	86,762	58.49%	61,579	41.51%	25,183	16.98%	148,341
Stevens	5,903	40.57%	8,647	59.43%	-2,744	-18.86%	14,550
Thurston	51,972	65.63%	27,217	34.37%	24,755	31.26%	79,189
Wahkiakum	799	52.64%	719	47.36%	80	5.27%	1,518
Walla Walla	8,321	56.69%	6,357	43.31%	1,964	13.38%	14,678
Whatcom	49,627	65.57%	26,062	34.43%	23,565	31.13%	75,689
Whitman	6,030	59.93%	4,032	40.07%	1,998	19.86%	10,062
Yakima	21,012	54.35%	17,647	45.65%	3,365	8.70%	38,659
Totals	1,247,265	65.05%	670,086	34.95%	577,179	30.10%	1,917,351

== See also ==
- Continuity of government
- List of Washington (state) ballot measures
