= Constitution of Washington =

American state constitution

Constitution of the State of Washington
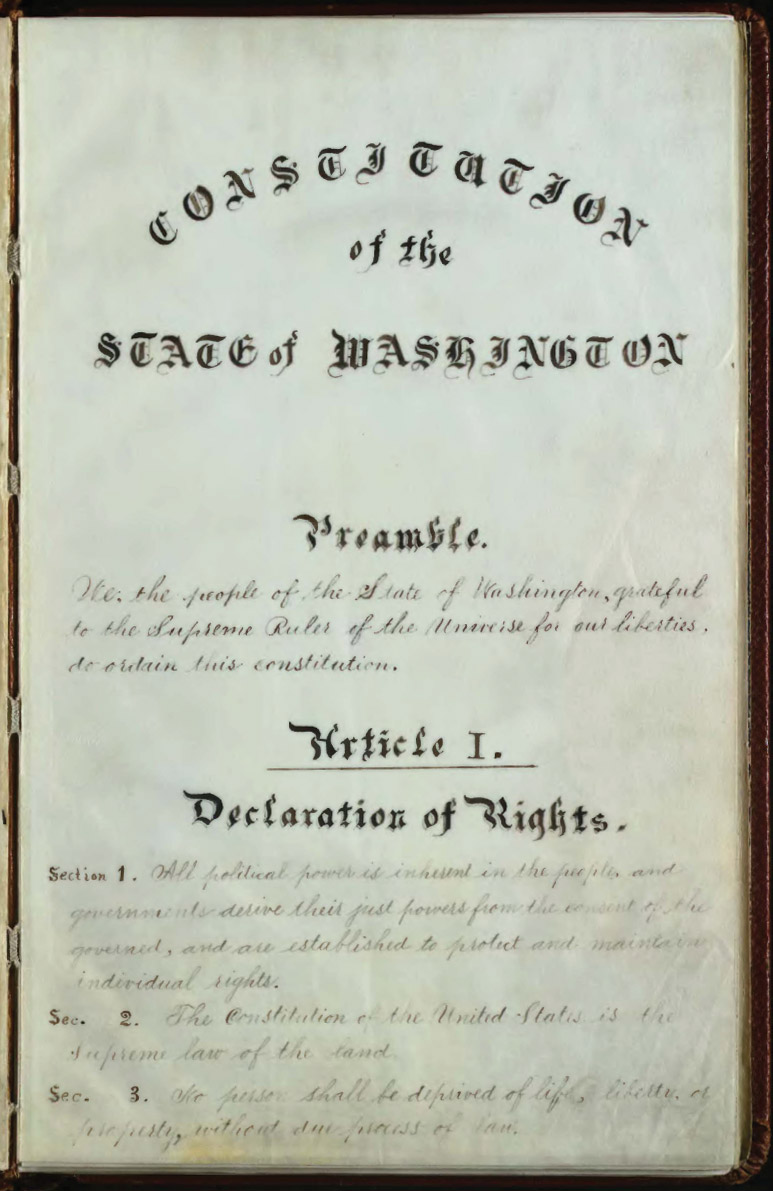
- Title page of the 1889 Constitution

Overview
- Jurisdiction: Washington State
- Subordinate to: Supreme law of the United States
- Created: August 23, 1889
- Ratified: November 11, 1889

The Constitution of the State of Washington is the document that describes the structure and function of the government of the U.S. state of Washington. The constitution was adopted as part of Washington Territory's path to statehood in 1889. An earlier constitution was drafted and ratified in 1878, but it was never officially adopted.

== Proposal and ratification ==
=== 1878 constitution ===
In 1877 Orange Jacobs, Washington Territory's Delegate to U.S. Congress, requested an enabling act that would allow Washington to become a state as soon as a state constitution was drafted and ratified by the voters. At the same time, an act was passed by the Washington Territorial Legislative Assembly to convene a constitutional convention. Without waiting for action by Congress, Washington's voters elected fifteen delegates who met in Walla Walla in June and July 1878 and drafted a constitution.

The voters of the territory approved the constitution in November 1878 with a vote of 6,537 in favor and 3,236 opposed. Congress, however, did not pass the statehood bill introduced by Jacobs. Washington Territory's next Delegate, Thomas H. Brents, also failed to get a statehood bill passed with the 1878 constitution. Later statehood bills abandoned the 1878 constitution and instead called for a state constitutional convention.

Although never approved by Congress, the 1878 constitution is an important historical document which shows the political thinking of the time. It was used extensively during the drafting of the 1889 document, the one and only official Constitution of the State of Washington.

=== 1889 constitution ===
In December 1888, Congress introduced an act to enable Washington, North Dakota, South Dakota, and Montana to become states. Among other requirements in the Enabling Act of 1889, Congress asked each prospective state to draft and ratify a state constitution.

An election was held to choose 75 delegates to frame a constitution for the State of Washington. The elected delegates assembled on July 4, 1889, in the Territorial Capitol Building in Olympia and labored through the summer to draft a constitution that would form the basis for all future Washington laws. On August 23, 1889, the convention concluded its work. Miles C. Moore, the last governor of Washington Territory, called for an election to be held on October 1, 1889, to ratify the state constitution and elect the officers of the new state government. A vote of 40,152 to 11,879 approved the Washington State Constitution.

A certified copy of the Constitution of the State of Washington was sent by courier to President Harrison whose approval was necessary before Washington was proclaimed a state. Days went by with no word; finally, on November 4, 1889, a message was received, stating that Governor Moore forgot to sign the Constitution and President Harrison could not approve it. Overnight a new copy was prepared, and it was sent to the President by courier the next day. On November 11, 1889, the President issued a proclamation declaring Washington's Constitution approved, and the state was admitted to the Union.

== Notable sections ==
The Constitution of Washington has clauses which have been interpreted to imply additional obligations on the state beyond what the equivalent clause in the US Constitution imposes. Whether the Constitution of Washington can be considered to impose these additional obligations is determined through non-exhaustive factors established in the keystone 1986 Washington Supreme Court ruling in State v. Gunwall.

=== Article 1, Section 5 ===
Every person may freely speak, write and publish on all subjects, being responsible for the abuse of that right.

This provision has long been considered to require independent analysis with regard to the protections in the First Amendment. While in many cases, including obscenity, commercial speech, and defamation, it is understood to be functionally identical, in some areas greater protections are afforded. State courts have found that restrictions on speech in a public forum require showing a "compelling state interest" rather than merely a "substantial state interest" in the case of the First Amendment. The Supreme Court has struck down a state law against false statements in political advertisements and restrictions on placing messages on the doors of public housing units on this basis. Since the wording in the Constitution of Washington makes no reference to state actors, it has been ruled that individuals have a constitutional right to solicit petition signatures at private shopping malls, as long as they did not interfere with its normal operations.

=== Article 1, Section 7 ===
No person shall be disturbed in his private affairs, or his home invaded, without authority of law.

This section of the Constitution of Washington was drafted by the delegate Allen Weir at the 1889 constitutional convention and submitted on July 11, 1889. Its wording was debated by the Rights Committee of the convention based on their knowledge of ongoing legal issues relating to the power of the US federal government. In particular, it is likely the committee wished to more firmly establish the principles of the US Supreme Court's 1886 decision Boyd v. United States regarding unreasonable search and seizure. The final wording was unanimously adopted by the committee on July 29, 1889.

The Washington Supreme Court long deemed Article 1, Section 7 to be substantially the same as the Fourth Amendment. However, in 1984 the Washington Supreme Court explicitly noted that the Constitution of Washington could provide greater protections against search and seizure than the US Constitution. Whereas the Fourth Amendment is grounded in a "reasonable" expectation of privacy which can change with public opinion or time, the protection for "private affairs" prohibits invasions of privacy. Later cases have found that this provision can protect against searches of a person's garbage, government requests for bank and phone records, as well as unwarranted searches of vehicles, which are rights to privacy generally not enforced by the federal constitution.

== See also ==
- 2019 Washington Senate Joint Resolution 8200
- Law of Washington (state)
