= 2016 Washington State Auditor election =

- November 8, 2016
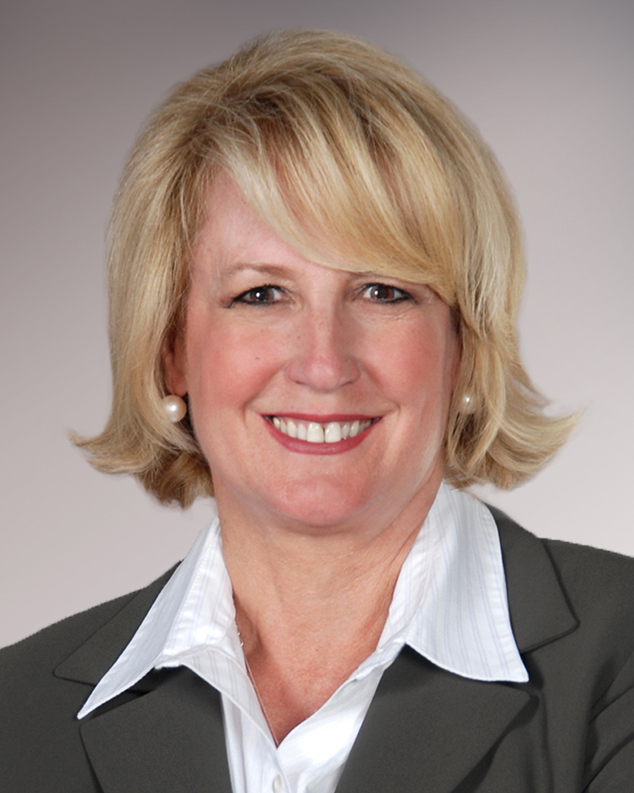

Nominee	Pat McCarthy	Mark Miloscia
Party	Democratic	Republican
Popular vote	1,597,011	1,455,771
Percentage	52.31%	47.69%
- McCarthy: 50–60% 60–70% 70–80% Miloscia: 50–60% 60–70% 70–80%
State Auditor before election
Troy Kelley
Democratic
Elected State Auditor
Pat McCarthy
Democratic

The 2016 Washington state auditor election was held on November 8, 2016, to elect the Washington state auditor, concurrently with the 2016 U.S. presidential election, as well as elections to the U.S. Senate and various state and local elections, including for U.S. House and governor of Washington. Washington is one of two states that holds a top-two primary, meaning that all candidates are listed on the same ballot regardless of party affiliation, and the top two move on to the general election.

Incumbent Democratic state auditor Troy Kelley retired. Democratic Pierce County executive Pat McCarthy narrowly defeated Republican state senator Mark Miloscia to succeed Kelley.

The top-two primary was held on August 2.

== Background ==
Kelley was elected in 2012 against Republican James Watkins, winning 53% of the vote to succeed conservative Democrat Brian Sonntag. He was indicted over federal charges of felony theft and money laundering. Several attempts to remove him from office, including a threat of impeachment by the legislature, proved unsuccessful. Kelley did not file to run for a second term.

== Primary election ==
=== Democratic Party ===
==== Advanced to general ====
- Pat McCarthy, Pierce County executive (2009–2017)

==== Eliminated in primary ====
- Jeff Sprung, attorney

==== Declined ====
- Troy Kelley, incumbent state auditor (2013–2017)

=== Republican Party ===
==== Advanced to general ====
- Mark Miloscia, state senator (2015–2019)

=== Third-party and independent candidates ===
==== Eliminated in primary ====
- David Golden (Independent), engineer
- Mark Wilson (Independent), forensic accountant

=== Endorsements ===
Pat McCarthy (D)

Statewide officials

- Christine Gregoire, former governor of Washington (2005–2013)

Local officials

- Dow Constantine, King County Executive (2009–2025)
Mark Miloscia (R)

Statewide officials

- Rob McKenna, former attorney general of Washington (2005–2013)
- Sam Reed, former secretary of state of Washington (2001–2013)
Jeff Sprung (D)

Statewide officials

- Bob Ferguson, attorney general of Washington (2013–2025)
- Brian Sonntag, former state auditor of Washington (1993–2013)

Newspapers

- The Seattle Times

=== Results ===
Two Democratic, one Republican and two independent candidates competed in the primary. Mark Miloscia (R) and Pat McCarthy (D) finished as the top two and advanced to the general election.

County results Miloscia: 30–40%; 40–50%; 50–60%; 60–70%; McCarthy: 30–40%; Sprung: 30–40%

Congressional district results Miloscia: 30–40%; 40–50%; 50–60%; Sprung: 30–40%; 50–60%

Blanket primary results
Party	Candidate	Votes	%
Republican	Mark Miloscia	481,910	36.71
Democratic	Pat McCarthy	381,828	29.09
Democratic	Jeff Sprung	314,290	23.94
Independent	Mark Wilson	96,972	7.39
Independent	David Golden	37,727	2.87
Total votes		1,312,727	100.00

==== By county ====
Combined partisan vote by county Democratic: 40–50%; 50–60%; 60–70%; Republican: 40–50%; 50–60%; 60–70%

Combined partisan vote by congressional district Democratic: 40–50%; 50–60%; 60–70%; 70–80%; Republican: 40–50%; 50–60%

County results
County	Pat McCarthy Democratic		Mark Miloscia Republican		Jeff Sprung Democratic		Various candidates Independent		Margin		Total votes
County	#	%	#	%	#	%	#	%	#	%	Total votes
Adams	342	18.97%	1,126	62.45%	92	5.10%	243	13.48%	784	43.48%	1,803
Asotin	1,208	28.87%	1,947	46.53%	442	10.56%	587	14.03%	739	17.66%	4,184
Benton	6,935	22.79%	16,000	52.59%	3,065	10.07%	4,425	14.54%	9,065	29.79%	30,425
Chelan	3,286	23.45%	7,418	52.93%	1,715	12.24%	1,595	11.38%	4,132	29.48%	14,014
Clallam	5,165	29.17%	7,423	41.93%	3,069	17.33%	2,048	11.57%	2,258	12.75%	17,705
Clark	19,701	27.75%	30,142	42.46%	12,508	17.62%	8,634	12.16%	10,441	14.71%	70,985
Columbia	189	19.61%	533	55.29%	78	8.09%	164	17.01%	344	35.68%	964
Cowlitz	5,198	29.61%	7,352	41.88%	2,369	13.49%	2,638	15.03%	2,154	12.27%	17,557
Douglas	1,384	21.12%	3,766	57.48%	567	8.65%	835	12.74%	2,382	36.36%	6,552
Ferry	390	22.41%	874	50.23%	170	9.77%	306	17.59%	484	27.82%	1,740
Franklin	1,865	22.85%	4,539	55.60%	662	8.11%	1,097	13.44%	2,674	32.76%	8,163
Garfield	124	21.99%	345	61.17%	28	4.96%	67	11.88%	221	39.18%	564
Grant	2,109	20.00%	6,071	57.58%	803	7.62%	1,560	14.80%	3,962	37.58%	10,543
Grays Harbor	4,119	33.08%	4,613	37.05%	1,763	14.16%	1,957	15.72%	494	3.97%	12,452
Island	5,496	26.68%	8,487	41.20%	4,469	21.69%	2,149	10.43%	2,991	14.52%	20,601
Jefferson	3,299	33.47%	2,632	26.61%	2,932	29.75%	1,003	10.18%	-367	-3.72%	9,857
King	117,046	28.16%	105,880	25.48%	164,702	39.63%	27,965	6.73%	-47,656	-11.47%	415,593
Kitsap	15,986	30.88%	19,636	37.93%	9,932	19.19%	6,215	12.01%	3,650	7.05%	51,769
Kittitas	1,814	24.48%	3,706	50.02%	948	12.80%	941	12.70%	1,892	25.54%	7,409
Klickitat	1,026	23.99%	2,060	48.16%	610	14.26%	581	13.58%	1,034	24.18%	4,277
Lewis	2,740	19.38%	7,984	56.46%	1,295	9.16%	2,121	15.00%	5,244	37.09%	14,140
Lincoln	455	17.54%	1,561	60.18%	154	5.94%	424	16.35%	1,106	42.64%	2,594
Mason	4,179	31.78%	5,512	41.92%	1,661	12.63%	1,796	13.66%	1,333	10.14%	13,148
Okanogan	1,813	22.74%	3,845	48.24%	1,214	15.23%	1,099	13.79%	2,032	25.49%	7,971
Pacific	1,691	32.99%	1,989	38.80%	683	13.32%	763	14.88%	298	5.81%	5,126
Pend Oreille	753	23.81%	1,497	47.34%	343	10.85%	569	17.99%	744	23.53%	3,162
Pierce	51,948	36.98%	56,297	40.07%	19,848	14.13%	12,395	8.82%	4,349	3.10%	140,488
San Juan	1,617	31.66%	1,436	28.12%	1,606	31.45%	448	8.77%	-11	-0.22%	5,107
Skagit	6,886	29.22%	9,793	41.55%	4,477	19.00%	2,411	10.23%	2,907	12.34%	23,567
Skamania	550	26.10%	1,019	48.36%	286	13.57%	252	11.96%	469	22.26%	2,107
Snohomish	41,792	30.77%	52,083	38.35%	26,421	19.45%	15,519	11.43%	10,291	7.58%	135,815
Spokane	26,373	28.59%	38,956	42.23%	12,843	13.92%	14,073	15.26%	12,583	13.64%	92,245
Stevens	2,132	20.68%	5,606	54.38%	779	7.56%	1,791	17.37%	3,474	33.70%	10,308
Thurston	17,933	30.78%	19,972	34.27%	14,868	25.52%	5,498	9.44%	2,039	3.50%	58,271
Wahkiakum	286	28.46%	472	46.97%	120	11.94%	127	12.64%	186	18.51%	1,005
Walla Walla	2,474	23.19%	4,984	46.72%	1,448	13.57%	1,762	16.52%	2,510	23.53%	10,668
Whatcom	12,468	27.30%	17,735	38.83%	11,555	25.30%	3,910	8.56%	5,267	11.53%	45,668
Whitman	1,719	27.07%	2,751	43.32%	950	14.96%	931	14.66%	1,032	16.25%	6,351
Yakima	7,337	26.36%	13,877	49.87%	2,815	10.12%	3,800	13.65%	6,540	23.50%	27,829
Totals	381,828	29.09%	481,910	36.71%	314,290	23.94%	134,699	10.26%	100,082	7.62%	1,312,727

Counties that flipped from Republican to Democratic

- Clallam (largest city: Port Angeles)
- Island (largest city: Oak Harbor)
- Skagit (largest city: Mount Vernon)
- Spokane (largest city: Spokane)
- Whatcom (largest city: Bellingham)

==== By congressional district ====
District	McCarthy	Miloscia	Sprung	Representative
1st	27%	41%	23%	Suzan DelBene
2nd	31%	35%	23%	Rick Larsen
3rd	27%	44%	15%	Jaime Herrera Beutler
4th	23%	53%	10%	Dan Newhouse
5th	27%	44%	13%	Cathy McMorris Rodgers
6th	34%	36%	18%	Derek Kilmer
7th	27%	15%	52%	Jim McDermott
8th	26%	46%	18%	Dave Reichert
9th	32%	28%	33%	Adam Smith
10th	34%	37%	19%	Denny Heck

== General election ==
=== Post-primary endorsements ===
Mark Milscia (R)

Newspapers

- The Seattle Times

=== Polling ===
Poll source	Date(s) administered	Sample size	Margin of error	Pat McCarthy (D)	Mark Miloscia (R)	Undecided
Elway Poll	October 20–22, 2016	502 (RV)	± 4.5%	39%	29%	32%
Elway Poll	August 9–13, 2016	500 (RV)	± 4.5%	37%	29%	34%

=== Results ===
2016 Washington State Auditor election
Party	Candidate	Votes	%	±%
Democratic	Pat McCarthy	1,597,011	52.31	–0.64
Republican	Mark Miloscia	1,455,771	47.69	+0.64
Total votes		3,052,782	100.00	N/A
Democratic hold				

==== By county ====
County results
County	Pat McCarthy Democratic		Mark Miloscia Republican		Margin		Total votes
County	#	%	#	%	#	%	Total votes
Adams	1,449	32.42%	3,020	67.58%	-1,571	-35.15%	4,469
Asotin	3,604	38.77%	5,693	61.23%	-2,089	-22.47%	9,297
Benton	27,675	35.65%	49,957	64.35%	-22,282	-28.70%	77,632
Chelan	12,285	39.13%	19,109	60.87%	-6,824	-21.74%	31,394
Clallam	17,493	46.68%	19,980	53.32%	-2,487	-6.64%	37,473
Clark	89,618	46.78%	101,962	53.22%	-12,344	-6.44%	191,580
Columbia	616	29.98%	1,439	70.02%	-823	-40.05%	2,055
Cowlitz	19,799	45.70%	23,522	54.30%	-3,723	-8.59%	43,321
Douglas	4,980	33.65%	9,821	66.35%	-4,841	-32.71%	14,801
Ferry	1,242	36.38%	2,172	63.62%	-930	-27.24%	3,414
Franklin	9,011	38.95%	14,125	61.05%	-5,114	-22.10%	23,136
Garfield	328	27.99%	844	72.01%	-516	-44.03%	1,172
Grant	8,557	31.52%	18,590	68.48%	-10,033	-36.96%	27,147
Grays Harbor	13,455	49.62%	13,660	50.38%	-205	-0.76%	27,115
Island	19,666	46.89%	21,395	52.11%	-1,729	-4.21%	41,061
Jefferson	12,420	63.88%	7,023	36.12%	5,397	27.76%	19,443
King	591,708	63.66%	337,754	36.34%	253,954	27.32%	929,462
Kitsap	60,572	50.56%	59,223	49.44%	1,349	1.13%	119,795
Kittitas	7,139	39.98%	10,717	60.02%	-3,578	-20.04%	17,856
Klickitat	4,354	42.40%	5,914	57.60%	-1,560	-15.19%	10,268
Lewis	10,813	33.06%	21,896	66.94%	-11,083	-33.88%	32,709
Lincoln	1,422	25.99%	4,050	74.01%	-2,628	-48.03%	5,472
Mason	12,661	46.99%	14,284	53.01%	-1,623	-6.02%	26,945
Okanogan	6,761	41.48%	9,540	58.52%	-2,779	-17.05%	16,301
Pacific	4,904	48.79%	5,147	51.21%	-243	-2.42%	10,051
Pend Oreille	2,295	35.17%	4,230	64.83%	-1,935	-29.66%	6,525
Pierce	171,823	51.02%	164,971	48.98%	6,852	2.03%	336,794
San Juan	6,821	66.81%	3,388	33.19%	3,433	33.63%	10,209
Skagit	25,433	47.49%	28,119	52.51%	-2,686	-5.02%	53,552
Skamania	2,343	44.17%	2,962	55.83%	-619	-11.67%	5,305
Snohomish	167,967	50.94%	161,752	49.06%	6,215	1.88%	329,719
Spokane	95,689	43.70%	123,279	56.30%	-27,590	-12.60%	218,968
Stevens	6,617	30.28%	15,236	69.72%	-8,619	-39.44%	21,853
Thurston	66,931	54.04%	56,918	45.96%	10,013	8.08%	123,849
Wahkiakum	897	41.82%	1,248	58.18%	-351	-16.36%	2,145
Walla Walla	9,868	40.84%	14,292	59.16%	-4,424	-18.31%	24,160
Whatcom	57,669	54.88%	47,409	45.12%	10,260	9.76%	105,078
Whitman	7,779	47.07%	8,748	52.93%	-969	-5.86%	16,527
Yakima	32,347	43.29%	42,382	56.71%	-10,035	-13.43%	74,729
Totals	1,597,011	52.31%	1,455,771	47.69%	141,240	4.63%	3,052,782

Counties that flipped from Democratic to Republican

- Cowlitz (largest city: Longview)
- Grays Harbor (largest city: Aberdeen)
- Pacific (largest city: Raymond)

==== By congressional district ====
McCarthy won five of ten congressional districts, with the remaining five going to Miloscia, including one that elected a Democrat.

District	McCarthy	Miloscia	Representative
1st	48%	52%	Suzan DelBene
2nd	55%	45%	Rick Larsen
3rd	45%	55%	Jaime Herrera Beutler
4th	38%	62%	Dan Newhouse
5th	42%	58%	Cathy McMorris Rodgers
6th	53%	47%	Derek Kilmer
7th	74%	26%	Jim McDermott
7th	74%	26%	Pramila Jayapal
8th	44%	56%	Dave Reichert
9th	63%	37%	Adam Smith
10th	53%	47%	Denny Heck
