= 2000 Washington State Auditor election =

- November 7, 2000
Nominee	Brian Sonntag	Richard McEntee	Chris Caputo
Party	Democratic	Republican	Libertarian
Popular vote	1,295,745	829,458	123,058
Percentage	57.63%	36.89%	5.47%
- Sonntag: 40–50% 50–60% 60–70% McEntee: 40–50% 50–60%
State Auditor before election
Brian Sonntag
Democratic
Elected State Auditor
Brian Sonntag
Democratic

The 2000 Washington State Auditor election was held on November 7, 2000, to elect the Washington State Auditor, concurrently with the 2000 U.S. presidential election, as well as elections to the U.S. Senate and various state and local elections, including for U.S. House and governor of Washington.

Two-term incumbent Democratic State Auditor Brian Sonntag was re-elected to his third term in office, defeating Republican Richard McEntee with 58% of the vote.

== Candidates ==
=== Democratic Party ===
==== Advanced to general ====
- Brian Sonntag, incumbent state auditor (1993–2013)

=== Republican Party ===
==== Advanced to general ====
- Richard McEntee, business consultant

=== Libertarian Party ===
==== Advanced to general ====
- Chris Caputo, former Microsoft software developer

== Primary election ==
The blanket primary was held on September 19.

=== Results ===
Results by county Sonntag: 40–50%; 50–60%; 60–70%; McEntee: 40–50%; 50–60%

Blanket primary results
Party	Candidate	Votes	%
Democratic	Brian Sonntag (incumbent)	661,775	56.35
Republican	Richard McEntee	441,270	37.57
Libertarian	Chris Caputo	71,359	6.08
Total votes		1,174,404	100.00

==== By county ====
County	Brian Sonntag Democratic		Richard McEntee Republican		Chris Caputo Libertarian		Margin		Total votes cast
County	#	%	#	%	#	%	#	%	Total votes cast
Adams	1,284	43.82%	1,527	52.12%	119	4.06%	-243	-8.29%	2,930
Asotin	2,026	47.81%	1,886	44.50%	326	7.69%	140	3.30%	4,238
Benton	11,310	42.71%	13,735	51.87%	1,434	5.42%	-2,425	-9.16%	26,479
Chelan	6,508	42.62%	7,841	51.35%	920	6.03%	-1,333	-8.73%	15,269
Clallam	8,649	49.33%	7,606	43.38%	1,277	7.28%	1,043	5.95%	17,532
Clark	26,919	50.21%	23,247	43.36%	3,442	6.42%	3,672	6.85%	53,608
Columbia	574	44.22%	664	51.16%	60	4.62%	-90	-6.93%	1,298
Cowlitz	11,303	59.30%	6,562	34.43%	1,196	6.27%	4,741	24.87%	19,061
Douglas	3,197	44.41%	3,622	50.31%	380	5.28%	-425	-5.90%	7,199
Ferry	922	45.58%	948	46.86%	153	7.56%	-26	-1.29%	2,023
Franklin	3,021	43.59%	3,527	50.89%	382	5.51%	-506	-7.30%	6,930
Garfield	377	45.20%	407	48.80%	50	6.00%	-30	-3.60%	834
Grant	4,784	40.65%	6,329	53.77%	657	5.58%	-1,545	-13.13%	11,770
Grays Harbor	9,491	65.13%	4,203	28.84%	879	6.03%	5,288	36.29%	14,573
Island	8,771	50.00%	7,820	44.58%	951	5.42%	951	5.42%	17,542
Jefferson	5,788	58.38%	3,400	34.29%	726	7.32%	2,388	24.09%	9,914
King	207,455	62.41%	103,450	31.12%	21,510	6.47%	104,005	31.29%	332,415
Kitsap	33,330	56.96%	21,496	36.73%	3,691	6.31%	11,834	20.22%	58,517
Kittitas	3,196	50.23%	2,804	44.07%	363	5.70%	392	6.16%	6,363
Klickitat	1,459	46.42%	1,485	47.25%	199	6.33%	-26	-0.83%	3,143
Lewis	6,889	44.43%	7,547	48.68%	1,068	6.89%	-658	-4.24%	15,504
Lincoln	1,320	41.47%	1,705	53.57%	158	4.96%	-385	-12.10%	3,183
Mason	7,372	58.48%	4,484	35.57%	751	5.96%	2,888	22.91%	12,607
Okanogan	3,670	44.41%	3,969	48.03%	624	7.55%	-299	-3.62%	8,263
Pacific	3,423	64.78%	1,575	29.81%	286	5.41%	1,848	34.97%	5,284
Pend Oreille	1,777	52.07%	1,400	41.02%	236	6.91%	377	11.05%	3,413
Pierce	87,939	61.73%	46,956	32.96%	7,554	5.30%	40,983	28.77%	142,449
San Juan	2,291	53.77%	1,611	37.81%	359	8.43%	680	15.96%	4,261
Skagit	11,036	50.83%	9,450	43.53%	1,224	5.64%	1,586	7.31%	21,710
Skamania	969	46.77%	875	42.23%	228	11.00%	94	4.54%	2,072
Snohomish	62,434	55.15%	43,895	38.77%	6,882	6.08%	18,539	16.38%	113,211
Spokane	44,010	52.37%	34,949	41.59%	5,070	6.03%	9,061	10.78%	84,029
Stevens	3,846	40.23%	4,882	51.07%	832	8.70%	-1,036	-10.84%	9,560
Thurston	33,468	63.26%	16,390	30.98%	3,045	5.76%	17,078	32.28%	52,903
Wahkiakum	694	56.24%	463	37.52%	77	6.24%	231	18.72%	1,234
Walla Walla	5,071	49.16%	4,736	45.91%	508	4.92%	335	3.25%	10,315
Whatcom	15,041	50.84%	13,005	43.96%	1,538	5.20%	2,036	6.88%	29,584
Whitman	3,728	48.27%	3,620	46.87%	375	4.86%	108	1.40%	7,723
Yakima	16,433	46.34%	17,199	48.50%	1,829	5.16%	-766	-2.16%	35,461
Totals	661,775	56.35%	441,270	37.57%	71,359	6.08%	220,505	18.78%	1,174,404

== General election ==
=== Results ===
2000 Washington State Auditor election
Party	Candidate	Votes	%	±%
Democratic	Brian Sonntag (incumbent)	1,295,745	57.63	–6.54
Republican	Richard McEntee	829,458	36.89	+1.06
Libertarian	Chris Caputo	123,058	5.47	N/A
Total votes		2,248,261	100.00	N/A
Democratic hold				

==== By county ====
County	Brian Sonntag Democratic		Richard McEntee Republican		Chris Caputo Libertarian		Margin		Total votes cast
County	#	%	#	%	#	%	#	%	Total votes cast
Adams	1,992	43.86%	2,367	52.11%	183	4.03%	-375	-8.26%	4,542
Asotin	3,384	47.34%	3,309	46.29%	455	6.37%	75	1.05%	7,148
Benton	24,603	43.19%	29,960	52.59%	2,403	4.22%	-5,357	-9.40%	56,966
Chelan	10,757	44.60%	12,193	50.56%	1,168	4.84%	-1,436	-5.95%	24,118
Clallam	14,386	50.61%	12,238	43.05%	1,803	6.34%	2,148	7.56%	28,427
Clark	62,031	50.28%	54,492	44.17%	6,854	5.56%	7,539	6.11%	123,377
Columbia	822	43.15%	1,004	52.70%	79	4.15%	-182	-9.55%	1,905
Cowlitz	19,304	57.20%	12,656	37.50%	1,788	5.30%	6,648	19.70%	33,748
Douglas	5,127	43.31%	6,203	52.40%	508	4.29%	-1,076	-9.09%	11,838
Ferry	1,252	44.91%	1,328	47.63%	208	7.46%	-76	-2.73%	2,788
Franklin	6,031	46.28%	6,358	48.79%	642	4.93%	-327	-2.51%	13,031
Garfield	504	42.64%	614	51.95%	64	5.41%	-110	-9.31%	1,182
Grant	8,929	40.39%	12,086	54.67%	1,092	4.94%	-3,157	-14.28%	22,107
Grays Harbor	15,070	62.67%	7,713	32.07%	1,264	5.26%	7,357	30.59%	24,047
Island	15,236	51.40%	12,901	43.53%	1,503	5.07%	2,335	7.88%	29,640
Jefferson	8,945	60.81%	4,880	33.17%	885	6.02%	4,065	27.63%	14,710
King	448,283	64.65%	202,636	29.22%	42,484	6.13%	245,647	35.43%	693,403
Kitsap	53,676	56.20%	36,494	38.21%	5,344	5.59%	17,182	17.99%	95,514
Kittitas	6,531	50.64%	5,721	44.36%	646	5.01%	810	6.28%	12,898
Klickitat	3,544	48.32%	3,292	44.88%	499	6.80%	252	3.44%	7,335
Lewis	12,644	46.38%	13,133	48.18%	1,484	5.44%	-489	-1.79%	27,261
Lincoln	1,906	41.56%	2,482	54.12%	198	4.32%	-576	-12.56%	4,586
Mason	12,073	58.85%	7,302	35.60%	1,139	5.55%	4,771	23.26%	20,514
Okanogan	5,877	43.80%	6,724	50.11%	818	6.10%	-847	-6.31%	13,419
Pacific	5,516	64.03%	2,665	30.93%	434	5.04%	2,851	33.09%	8,615
Pend Oreille	2,461	49.42%	2,169	43.55%	350	7.03%	292	5.86%	4,980
Pierce	158,021	62.50%	83,460	33.01%	11,346	4.49%	74,561	29.49%	252,827
San Juan	4,362	58.11%	2,606	34.72%	538	7.17%	1,756	23.39%	7,506
Skagit	21,970	53.07%	17,216	41.59%	2,209	5.34%	4,754	11.48%	41,395
Skamania	1,868	47.93%	1,637	42.01%	392	10.06%	231	5.93%	3,897
Snohomish	130,280	56.63%	87,390	37.99%	12,376	5.38%	42,890	18.64%	230,046
Spokane	83,299	52.86%	66,343	42.10%	7,957	5.05%	16,956	10.76%	157,599
Stevens	6,725	41.49%	8,306	51.25%	1,176	7.26%	-1,581	-9.76%	16,207
Thurston	56,211	63.27%	27,967	31.48%	4,664	5.25%	28,244	31.79%	88,842
Wahkiakum	987	56.34%	678	38.70%	87	4.97%	309	17.64%	1,752
Walla Walla	9,336	48.12%	9,146	47.14%	919	4.74%	190	0.98%	19,401
Whatcom	34,027	52.52%	27,331	42.18%	3,434	5.30%	6,696	10.33%	64,792
Whitman	7,094	62.37%	3,527	31.01%	753	6.62%	3,567	31.36%	11,374
Yakima	30,681	47.55%	30,931	47.94%	2,912	4.51%	-250	-0.39%	64,524
Totals	1,295,745	57.63%	829,458	36.89%	123,058	5.47%	466,287	20.74%	2,248,261

Counties that flipped from Democratic to Republican

- Adams (largest city: Othello)
- Benton (largest city: Kennewick)
- Chelan (largest city: Wenatchee)
- Columbia (largest city: Dayton)
- Ferry (largest city: Republic)
- Franklin (largest city: Pasco)
- Garfield (largest city: Pomeroy)
- Lewis (largest city: Centralia)
- Lincoln (largest city: Davenport)
- Okanogan (largest city: Omak)
- Stevens (largest city: Colville)
- Yakima (largest city: Yakima)
