= Tim Eyman =

American anti-tax activist (born 1965)

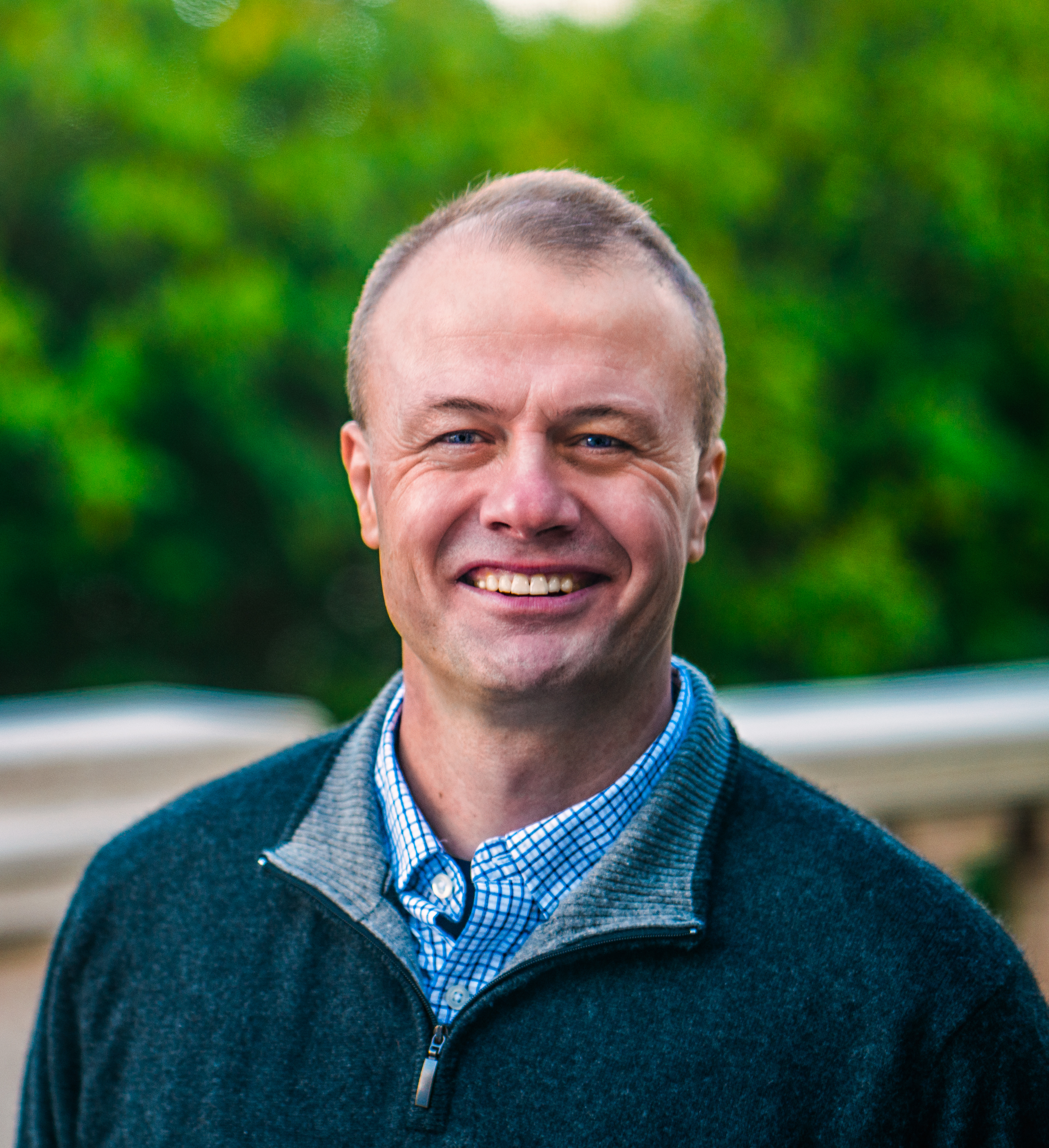
- Eyman in 2020
- Born: Timothy Donald Eyman; December 22, 1965 (age 60); Yakima, Washington, U.S.
- Education: Washington State University (BA, cum laude; minor: Economics)
- Years active: 22
- Known for: Anti-tax activism
- Political party: Republican / Independent Republican
- Website: timdefense.com

Timothy Donald Eyman (born December 22, 1965) is an American anti-tax activist.

Since 1997, Eyman has become the most prolific sponsor of Washington ballot measures in its history, having qualified seventeen statewide initiatives. Eleven initiatives were passed by voters, though most of these in turn were later partially or wholly overturned by courts as unconstitutional. His first and most notable success was an initiative preventing affirmative action in Washington State.

Eyman's most prominent ballot measures are part of an unsuccessful "20 year tug-of-war" with the state over lowering motor vehicle excise taxes, or "car tabs" to defund Sound Transit, under the slogan "$30 Tabs", of which 2019's Initiative 976 is the most recent. It was ruled unconstitutional in 2020.

In February 2021, Eyman was convicted for violations of campaign finance law, fined $2.6 million, and barred from "managing, controlling, negotiating, or directing financial transactions" for any kind of political committee. In April 2021, he was ordered to pay an additional $2.9 million to reimburse the Washington State Attorney General's legal costs in pursuing civil penalties against him. He is currently bankrupt, and in December 2021 a court ordered sale of assets to meet $5.4m in legal liabilities to the State of Washington.

== Early life and education ==
Timothy Donald Eyman was born in Yakima, Washington and adopted shortly after birth. He graduated from Yakima's West Valley High School and went on to attend Washington State University (WSU) on an academic scholarship.

At WSU, he was initiated into Delta Tau Delta and competed on the university's intercollegiate wrestling team, finishing third in the Pacific-10 Conference. He received a bachelor's degree in 1988 in business management.

== Career ==
=== Mail order business ===
After graduating from WSU, Eyman began a mail order business out of his home selling engraved wristwatches to members of Greek Letter Organizations.

=== Entry into politics ===
In 1995, while living in Seattle's Green Lake neighborhood, a King County tax proposal before voters sought to raise $250 million for a new Seattle Mariners stadium. Eyman attended a public meeting where a Seattle radio host, Dave Ross, was speaking. There Eyman decided to help gather signatures at Green Lake while holding a cardboard sign reading, “Let the voters decide”, and gathered 100 signatures on his first day.

Voters ended up rejecting the tax package. Mariners' owner Nintendo of America insisted the city provide the $250 million funding, or the team would be sold. In an emergency session, Governor Mike Lowry and the legislature authorized King County to levy stadium bond taxes, which ended up being placed on restaurants and car rentals. Despite opposition from voters, the stadium now called T-Mobile Park was built and new taxes were imposed.

This experience drew Eyman into politics, and he often describes it as his “baptism of fire.” As he saw it, “They overruled what the voters did.” In 1997, Eyman sponsored his first ballot measure, Initiative 200, a Washington spin-off of California’s Proposition 209, which passed in 1996. Ward Connerly, an African-American businessman and Proposition 209's sponsor, would become Eyman’s hero and inspiration for his own initiative activism. Initiative 200 was approved by voters in 1998, winning 58.2% of the vote.

=== Initiative 695 and $30 Car Tabs origin ===
Inspired by the 1998 "No Car Tax" campaign slogan of Virginia's then future governor, Jim Gilmore, Eyman sponsored Initiative 695 in 1999. It was an Initiative to the People to lower the fee for "car tabs" (the common name in Washington for car taxes, or motor vehicle excise taxes / MVET) in the state of Washington to a flat fee of $30.

Eyman's effort to circulate petitions and gather signatures resulted in 514,141 signatures total. Despite a broad institutional consensus in opposition – including "politicians, governments, the media, business big and small, environmentalists, civic groups, and labor" – voters approved the initiative with 56.16% of the vote, garnering nearly one million votes. Prior to the passage of Initiative 695, car tab fees were 2.2% of the value of the vehicle.

Initiative 695 not only cut car tabs to $30, but also required voter approval of all proposed taxes at the state or local level. After its passage, the initiative was immediately challenged by opponents, citing its effect on government budgets and its violation of a single-subject rule for initiatives. The Washington Supreme Court struck the provision for voter approval of taxes, but allowed the car tab cuts to remain.

While the court considered the constitutionality of the main provision, Democratic governor Gary Locke called a special session of the legislature to pass the $30 car tab flat fee provision into law, lay out budget cuts to account for the tax reduction, and Attorney General Gregoire defended it before the court. Despite "Microsoft, Boeing, Weyerhaeuser, labor, and virtually every editorial page in the state opposing I-695", and more than $2.1 million spent in the campaign against it, the $30 car tab fee was formally signed into law on March 30 after a positive ruling by the courts.

A January 2001 assessment by the conservative Washington Policy Center of the measure's effect claimed a net savings of $750 million in the first year, and twenty-one predictions made by opponents had not materialized. Eyman's work on Initiative 695 in 2000 ($30 Car Tabs) was recognized by the Conservative Political Action Conference with its Ronald Reagan Award.

=== Permanent Offense ===
Following the success of that measure, (Note: The initiative passed by vote but was subsequently declared unconstitutional by the Washington Supreme Court. Following the court ruling, the Washington State Legislature enacted a substantially similar version of the initiative as a regular statute law.) Eyman established a political action committee called Permanent Offense to campaign for other anti-tax initiatives. In 2000 he began taking a salary as head of Permanent Offense, receiving $45,000 that year. According to Eyman, his decision to begin paying himself was due to the time he had invested into campaigning that had resulted in a loss of income from his watch business. He has since been described as a "professional initiative filer".

Eyman has been the primary sponsor of ballot initiatives concerning taxes and transportation almost every year since the passage of Initiative 695. Of seventeen initiatives that qualified for the ballot, eleven were passed by vote, however, a majority of those were subsequently overturned or partially invalidated in subsequent court action.

== Political views ==
Eyman has previously described himself as an "independent Republican", also noting that he is an admirer of Ralph Nader and Rob McKenna. He has been variously described by others as a "populist" and a "libertarian". Knute Berger once called him "a political player on a par with Governor Christine Gregoire and House Speaker Frank Chopp" and "the most influential conservative in the state".

In a 2006 interview with the Seattle Weekly, Eyman said "...there are Democrats and Republicans that really respect the initiative process. It’s those particular elected officials I admire the most, because they realize that they don’t have all the answers". As of 2019, according to Eyman, he had no formal party affiliation and was "equally frustrated by Republicans and Democrats at times". Writing in 2005, David S. Broder described Eyman as "a personable young man who has made a cottage industry of organizing tax-limitation initiatives".

== Political activities after 1999 ==
=== 2000 ===
After the implementation of the I-695 tax cuts by the legislature, many local governments raised taxes and fees in 1999 to cover the shortfall. Stating local governments largely raised property taxes to cover deficits and the legislature's use of the state budget surplus to cover shortfalls negated the need for tax increases a, Eyman sponsored Initiative 722 to reverse negate new property tax increases by capping yearly increases at 2%. Other taxes increases, like school levies, were not subject to I-722's tax increase limits. The measure won 55.89% voter approval.

=== 2001 ===
Citing Washington as being the "5th highest taxed state in the nation," with property taxes that "double every 7 to 9 years" from "decades" of yearly increases as high as 6%, Eyman filed Initiative 747 to limit property taxes in Washington. This measure sought to impose a 1% cap on annual property tax increases. It won with 57.6% voter approval. In 2007, after the initiative was declared unconstitutional by the Washington State Supreme Court, Governor Christine Gregoire called a special session of the legislature to restore the 1% property tax increase limit. It passed 39–9 in the Senate, and 86–8 in the House.

=== 2002 ===
With Governor Locke's $30 car tab law expiring, Eyman sponsored Initiative 776. It was a re-boot of Initiative 695 and continued the theme of $30 Car Tabs. It passed with 51.47%, gaining just over 900,000 votes.

=== 2005 ===
Frustrated by the passage of tax increases from Governor Gregoire despite promises not to raise them, Eyman introduced Initiative 900 to increase the power of the Washington state auditor to conduct performance audits. The initiative was approved by the voters by 56.4%, receiving nearly one million votes.

A 2009 report found a mixed reception by local officials to the performance audits. In December 2013, Democratic Washington state auditor Brian Sonntag said his office had identified almost $1.3 billion in potential five-year savings and increased revenue, after doing more than fifty performance audits and reviews.

=== 2006 ===
On January 30, Eyman filed an initiative and a referendum, both intended to repeal a measure which added sexual orientation to the list of categories against which discrimination in housing, lending, and employment is banned in the state of Washington. In addition to seeking to remove "sexual orientation" from the law, Eyman pushed an initiative that would prohibit state government from requiring quotas or other preferential treatment for any person or group "based on sexual orientation or sexual preference". Eyman had announced he would be turning in the signatures for the gay-rights referendum on June 5. Instead, he showed up at the State Capitol dressed as Darth Vader and then announced he would turn in petitions the next day, at the deadline. He reportedly wasn't carrying any of the signatures, but instead was carrying signed petitions for another car-tab measure unrelated to the referendum. The next day, June 6, Eyman announced he had fallen more than 7,000 signatures short of the 112,440 required to get the measure placed on the November ballot. The state law that he had attempted to put to a public vote took effect on the same day.

On January 9, Eyman filed an initiative to cap motor vehicle registration charges at $30 per year and repeal taxes and fees exceeding the $30 limit. On June 29, Eyman submitted 14,270 pages of signatures for this initiative to the Secretary of State's office. On July 7, Eyman submitted an additional 2,716 pages. While at the front desk, and prior to the counting of any signatures, Eyman requested that the receptionist date stamp a piece of note pad with the number 300,353 on it.

On July 23 Eyman charged the secretary of state's office with "... gross incompetence, purposeful sabotage, or blatant dishonesty" for the discrepancy of 34,347 signatures. Along with the "receipt" with the number 300,353, Eyman claimed to have kept weekly logs of the number of signatures collected, and wrote the weight (although not the number of pages or signatures) of each box of petitions on the boxes themselves. The secretary of state's office could not provide the boxes, as they were recycled upon the cataloging of the signatures. It also denied the credibility of Eyman's receipt, noting that official counting had not even begun at that point, and calling attention to their own official receipts. Eyman has been completely unable to substantiate his claim of submitting 300,353 signatures, as he claims to have not made copies of the petitions. On July 28, the secretary of state's office announced that it had conducted a random sample test of 4% of the signatures, finding an invalidation rate of 17.96%. Based upon this number, the initiative failed to make the ballot. A full check of all signatures collected confirmed this conclusion.

In August 2006 a Thurston County judge blocked a tongue-in-cheek initiative (I-831) proposed by Seattle-area computer programmer and blogger David Goldstein that would have allowed voters to criticize – or support – Tim Eyman by declaring, "The citizens of the state of Washington do hereby proclaim that Tim Eyman is a horse's ass."

=== 2007 ===
In 2007, Eyman spearheaded Initiative 960, requiring a 2/3 majority for the legislature to raise taxes and legislative approval for the state to raise fees . It passed with more than 51% of the vote. The automated public notification system the initiative created a "political minefield" for legislators who proposed bills that would raise taxes or fees by creating public awareness about those costs.

=== 2008 ===
In 2008, Eyman sponsored I-985, which had the purpose to reduce traffic congestion through various means including:

- Opening HOV/carpool lanes to all vehicles during non-peak hours, where "non-peak" is defined as any time outside of 6-9am and 3-6pm on Mondays through Fridays.
- Requiring local governments to synchronize traffic lights on heavily traveled arterials and streets.
- Clearing out accidents faster with expanded emergency roadside assistance, which would be funded by vehicle sales tax revenues.
- Restricting toll usage such that they can only be used on the freeway or bridge being tolled, with any surplus revenue to be redirected to other congestion relief efforts in the state.

Eyman submitted approximately 290,000 signatures to get the initiative on the ballot for the 2008 general election. The initiative claims to follow the recommendations of a congestion study by state auditor Brian Sonntag, but former state transportation secretary Doug MacDonald stated that there is "no connection" between the study's findings and the initiative's goals. Auditor Sonntag himself directly refuted the claim that I-985 implements the recommendations of the state congestion audit.

Critics argued that opening HOV lanes to more cars would not reduce congestion, due to induced demand, and in fact would likely cause worse congestion since rush-hour traffic typically lasts longer than 3 hours each morning and night during weekdays. I-985 would also have stalled funding for the replacement of the Evergreen Point Floating Bridge, since the bridge's construction is currently dependent on tolls that will come from both the current bridge and the I-90 floating bridge. Since both bridges cross Lake Washington, requiring tolls on only one bridge would serve only to push traffic to the other. The initiative also directed no funding toward mass transit, counteracting the desired goals of the revised Proposition 1, which sought funding for expansion of light rail, commuter trains, and bus service in the Puget Sound region. Proponents of I-985 pointed out that highways I-405 and SR 167 have opened their HOV lanes during non peak hours without any noticeable problems.

The initiative was defeated 60% to 40% with only one of the state's 39 counties approving the initiative.

=== 2009 ===
In 2009, Eyman sponsored I-1033, which would apply a cap on revenue tied to the consumer price index and population. The bill is similar to TABOR which was enacted in 1992, and then placed on a five-year timeout in 2005 by referendum, in Colorado. The initiative was rejected by voters.

=== 2010 ===
Eyman joined BanCams, a local advocacy group opposed to traffic ticketing cameras, in pursuing local initiatives to ban their use in multiple Washington cities, including Monroe, Bellingham and his hometown of Mukilteo.

In 2010, the legislature exercised its power to suspend voter initiatives which have been in effect for two years and suspended 2007's Initiative 960, which required a 2/3 majority in the legislature to raise taxes. In response, Eyman introduced Initiative 1053 to reinstate the 2/3 majority requirement for the legislature to raise taxes, an approach voters supported since it was first proposed in 1993. The initiative was approved by voters with the highest margin of any of Eyman's previous initiatives with a 63.75% majority.

=== 2012 ===
Eyman sponsored 25 initiatives for 2012, of which only Initiative 1185 made it onto the November general ballot. It passed with 63.91% of the vote. Approximately 95% of the money to support the initiative was reportedly from "corporate behemoths such as oil companies ... the national beer and soda-pop industries and big pharmaceutical firms."

=== 2013 ===
Eyman filed Initiative 517 on April 15, 2012, to "set penalties for interfering with signature-gatherers or signers." It was referred to 2013 session of legislature, which declined to pass it, sending it to the general election for November 5, 2013. Among those opposing I-517 were former Republican attorney general of Washington, Rob McKenna, publishing on smartergovernmentwa.org:

Former Republican Attorney General of Washington, Rob McKenna, urging a NO vote on I-517: —

I-517, the "initiative on initiatives," would lengthen the amount of time initiative organizers have to gather signatures and require access to public buildings and certain pieces of private property for signature gatherers to solicit signatures.

The initiative and referendum system is one of our most important democratic tools and the right of the people to petition their government should be robustly protected. While I-517 has some positive aspects, it goes too far and its impositions on private property owners will likely be struck down by the courts.

I-517 was also opposed by The Seattle Times, The Columbian newspaper, The Wenatchee World, The Everett Herald, The Olympian, Washington Research Council, The News Tribune, Northwest Progressive Institute, Seattle Seahawks, Seattle Sounders FC, Washington State Democratic Party and many local Democratic organizations.

The initiative lost by a margin of 63%-37%.

=== 2018 ===
On March 15, 2018, Eyman introduced two referendum measures with the intent to put all or portions of a recently passed law EHB2957 that effectively phases out non-native finfish aquaculture to a public vote. Eyman withdrew both referendum measures after Cooke Aquaculture, the only company farming nonnative Atlantic salmon in Washington, made it clear they did not want to be associated with his referendum campaign.

From Joel Richardson, Vice President of Public Affairs for Cooke Aquaculture, on the company's involvement with the campaign--

Our company had no affiliation with this individual... Our efforts remain focused on exploring operational options which are helpful and respectful to our employees, tribal, state and community partner.

=== 2019 ===
Initiative 976 again sought to cap car tabs at $30 and end transportation benefit districts and other local vehicle taxes. It passed with 53% of the vote. Like Eyman's 1999 Initiative 695 on the same topic, Initiative 976 was reviewed by the Washington Supreme Court, but the current governor of Washington declined to let it become law as the governor in 2000 did.

In February 2020, the King County Superior Court largely upheld I-976, but kept the measure on hold pending a ruling from the Washington State Supreme Court. On October 15, 2020 the Washington State Supreme Court struck down the initiative by ruling it unconstitutional because it "contains more than one subject and its subject is not accurately expressed in its title".

=== 2020 ===
In November 2019, Eyman announced that he was running for Governor of Washington in 2020, while making a public comment at a Sound Transit meeting, as a Republican. He formally entered the race as a Republican in a speech in his hometown Yakima, where he laid out his intention to run an aggressive campaign against Inslee, ignore his primary opponents, focus on conservative issues, and embrace the perceived similarities between him and President Donald Trump in terms of style, attitude and ability to weather attacks from the Left.

During Governor Jay Inslee's 2020 shutdown of the state, Eyman used his campaign to challenge Inslee over numerous aspects of his restrictions and proclamations from his COVID-19 response, including distinguishing between “essential” and “non-essential” businesses and workers, the closure of schools and the requirement to wear masks. After Inslee ordered a statewide ban on gatherings of more than 250 people to prevent spread of COVID-19, Eyman promoted a public event for which he set a goal of 251 attendees.

Eyman finished fourth in the top-two primary, with 6.41 percent of the vote.

== Legal issues ==
=== Payments from campaign contributions ===
In February 2002 the Seattle Post-Intelligencer reported that Eyman paid himself $165,000 from campaign donations, while claiming to be working for free. Eyman initially denied receiving payments, but later admitted wrongdoing. The Washington State Public Disclosure Commission, the state equivalent of the Federal Election Commission charged Eyman with diverting $233,000 from his initiative campaigns. Eyman eventually settled with the Washington State Attorney General's office, paying $50,000 and accepting a lifetime ban on involvement in any political committee's financial accounts. Since the settlement, Eyman's co-sponsors and chairmen in his Permanent Offense political committee became more actively involved; Monte Benham of Kennewick became the head of Permanent Offense, though Eyman remained involved politically.

=== Campaign reporting omissions ===
In March 2017, The Washington State Attorney General sued Eyman for $2.1M accusing Eyman of enriching himself with money donated to initiative campaigns. The lawsuit stemmed from a 2015 investigation by the Public Disclosure Commission into Eyman's use of donations to different initiative campaigns.

In February 2020, Eyman was found to have been in violation of Washington campaign finance laws for at least the last seven years, concealing nearly $800,000 in political contributions.

On February 10, 2021, as a result of violating Washington campaign finance laws, Eyman was fined $2.6 million and barred from "managing, controlling, negotiating, or directing financial transactions for any political committee." In April 2021, Eyman was ordered to also pay $2.9M in legal fees related to the case; the judge described Eyman's violations as “numerous and particularly egregious” and said Eyman had used campaign contributions to enrich himself.

=== Chair theft ===
On February 13, 2019, Eyman was accused of stealing a $70 office chair from an Office Depot in Lacey. On February 19 the Lacey city prosecutor filed one count of theft against Eyman related to the incident. Through his attorney, Eyman released a statement that the incident was caused by his being distracted by telephone call when he returned to the store to pay for services and merchandise. The charge was to be dismissed in March 2020, under the condition that Eyman committed no criminal activity for 9 months.

== Personal life ==
As of 2022, Eyman lives in Bellevue, Washington.

Divorced from his wife, the couple are the adoptive parents of three children. In 2018, Eyman filed for Chapter 11 bankruptcy protection. In December 2021, after continuing to default on fines due to the State of Washington, his bankruptcy was converted by a court to chapter 7 and the court ordered sale of assets to meet $5.4m in liabilities.

== Initiatives and outcomes ==
Initiative	Year	Purpose	Election Result	Outcome
I-200	1998	Prohibit affirmative action in public employment, education and contracting.	Passed with 58%	
I-695	1999	Cut the state motor vehicle excise tax (the yearly car tabs) from a percentage of the value to a flat $30 and required voter approval for all tax increases.	Passed with 56%	Declared unconstitutional
I-722	2000	Limit property tax increases to 2% per year and nullify certain 1999 tax increases.	Passed with 56%	Declared unconstitutional
I-745	2000	Reserve 90% of all transportation funds, including transit taxes, for road building. It also would have required transportation agency performance audits.	Defeated with 59% against	
I-747	2001	Require state and local governments to limit property tax levy increases to 1% per year, unless an increase greater than this limit is approved by the voters at an election.	Passed with 57%	Declared unconstitutional in Superior Court and Supreme Court in 2007
I-776	2002	Require license tab fees to be $30 per year for motor vehicles, including light trucks. Certain local-option vehicle excise taxes and fees used for roads and transit would be repealed.	Passed with 51%	Declared unconstitutional
I-267	2002	Divert money from the general fund for road building.		Failed to qualify for ballot
I-807	2003	Require a supermajority vote for all tax increases.		Failed to qualify for ballot
I-864	2003	Cut property taxes by 25%.		Failed to qualify for ballot
I-18	2003	Reduce size of King County Council from 13 to 9 members	Passed	
I-892	2004	Authorize additional “electronic scratch ticket machines” to reduce property taxes. Authorize licensed non-tribal gambling establishments to operate the same type and number of machines as tribal governments, with a portion of tax revenue generated used to reduce state property taxes.	Defeated with 62% against	
I-900	2005	Direct the state auditor to conduct performance audits of state and local governments, and dedicate 0.16% of the state's portion of sales and use tax collections to fund these audits	Passed With 56%	Passed by voters
Referendum 65	2006	Repeal ESHB 2661, legalizing discrimination based on sexual orientation.		Failed to qualify for ballot
I-917	2006	Cap motor vehicle registration charge at $30 a year.		Failed to qualify for ballot
I-960	2007	Require a 2/3 majority in state Legislature to raise taxes and fees.	Passed with 51%	Passed by voters. Partially repealed by legislature in 2010 and declared unconstitutional in 2013.
I-985	2008	Attempt to reduce vehicular traffic congestion through the elimination of car-pool lanes and mandatory signal timing across the entire state, among other means.	Defeated by voters with 60% against	
I-1033	2009	Apply an inflation and population-tied cap to tax revenue.	Defeated by voters with 55% against	
I-1053	2010	Reinstate 2/3 Legislature majority requirement set by I-960 (which was repealed in early 2010).	Passed with 64%	Declared unconstitutional in 2013.
I-1125	2011	Restrict toll rate increases and the means by which toll revenue is spent.	Defeated by voters with 53% against	
I-1185	2012	Reinstate 2/3 statutory requirement for new or increased fees.	Passed with 64%	Declared unconstitutional
I-517	2012	Increase time for signature gathering from ten to sixteen months prior to an election. Provide unlimited access to - and legal protection for - signature gathering on public sidewalks and walkways and all sidewalks and walkways that carry pedestrian traffic, including those in front of the entrances and exits of any store, and inside or outside public buildings such as public sports stadiums, convention/exhibition centers, and public fairs. Set penalties for interfering with signature-gatherers or signers.	Defeated by voters with over 62% against	
Referendums 78 & 79	2018	Bring EHB2957, a bill to phase out Atlantic salmon net pens in Washington, to a public vote.		Withdrawn
I-976	2019	Cut all car-tab taxes in the state to a $30 flat fee.	Passed with 53%	Declared unconstitutional
