= 2004 Washington State Auditor election =

- November 2, 2004
Nominee	Brian Sonntag	Will Baker
Party	Democratic	Republican
Popular vote	1,668,575	841,772
Percentage	63.89%	32.23%
- Sonntag: 40–50% 50–60% 60–70% 70–80% Baker: 40–50% 50–60%
State Auditor before election
Brian Sonntag
Democratic
Elected State Auditor
Brian Sonntag
Democratic

The 2004 Washington State Auditor election was held on November 2, 2004, to elect the Washington State Auditor, concurrently with the 2004 U.S. presidential election, as well as elections to the U.S. Senate and various state and local elections, including for U.S. House and governor of Washington. Primary elections took place on September 14.

Three-term incumbent Democratic State Auditor Brian Sonntag was re-elected to his fourth term in office, defeating Republican perennial candidate Will Baker with 64% of the vote.

== Democratic primary ==
=== Candidates ===
==== Nominee ====
- Brian Sonntag, incumbent state auditor (1993–2013)

=== Results ===
Democratic primary results
Party	Candidate	Votes	%
Democratic	Brian Sonntag (incumbent)	617,233	100.00%
Total votes		617,233	100.00%

== Republican primary ==
=== Candidates ===
==== Nominee ====
- Will Baker, perennial candidate

=== Results ===
Republican primary results
Party	Candidate	Votes	%
Republican	Will Baker	410,710	100.00%
Total votes		410,710	100.00%

== Libertarian primary ==
=== Candidates ===
==== Nominee ====
- Jason G. Bush

=== Results ===
Libertarian primary results
Party	Candidate	Votes	%
Libertarian	Jason G. Bush	12,577	100.00%
Total votes		12,577	100.00%

== General election ==
=== Endorsements ===
Brian Sonntag (D)

Newspapers

- The Seattle Times

=== Results ===
2004 Washington State Auditor election
Party	Candidate	Votes	%	±%
Democratic	Brian Sonntag (incumbent)	1,668,575	63.89	+6.26
Republican	Will Baker	841,772	32.23	–4.66
Libertarian	Jason G. Bush	101,161	3.87	–1.60
Total votes		2,611,508	100.00	N/A
Democratic hold				

==== By county ====
County	Brian Sonntag Democratic		Will Baker Republican		Jason G. Bush Libertarian		Margin		Total votes cast
County	#	%	#	%	#	%	#	%	Total votes cast
Adams	2,102	45.17%	2,379	51.12%	173	3.72%	-277	-5.95%	4,654
Asotin	4,016	49.99%	3,699	46.04%	319	3.97%	317	3.95%	8,034
Benton	28,170	46.63%	29,785	49.31%	2,453	4.06%	-1,615	-2.67%	60,408
Chelan	13,865	51.41%	12,169	45.12%	938	3.48%	1,696	6.29%	26,972
Clallam	18,914	58.02%	12,218	37.48%	1,465	4.49%	6,696	20.54%	32,597
Clark	86,794	55.97%	61,999	39.98%	6,279	4.05%	24,795	15.99%	155,072
Columbia	960	50.05%	878	45.78%	80	4.17%	82	4.28%	1,918
Cowlitz	24,685	62.81%	13,098	33.33%	1,515	3.86%	11,587	29.48%	39,298
Douglas	6,099	49.11%	5,897	47.48%	423	3.41%	202	1.63%	12,419
Ferry	1,519	50.30%	1,345	44.54%	156	5.17%	174	5.76%	3,020
Franklin	7,149	47.18%	7,408	48.89%	595	3.93%	-259	-1.71%	15,152
Garfield	554	47.76%	555	47.84%	51	4.40%	-1	-0.09%	1,160
Grant	10,738	44.77%	12,264	51.13%	983	4.10%	-1,526	-6.36%	23,985
Grays Harbor	17,459	67.46%	7,424	28.68%	999	3.86%	10,035	38.77%	25,882
Island	20,141	57.87%	13,444	38.63%	1,217	3.50%	6,697	19.24%	34,802
Jefferson	12,007	69.34%	4,600	26.56%	710	4.10%	7,407	42.77%	17,317
King	585,916	73.01%	186,960	23.30%	29,584	3.69%	398,956	49.72%	802,460
Kitsap	69,496	62.89%	36,774	33.28%	4,230	3.83%	32,722	29.61%	110,500
Kittitas	8,286	56.33%	5,849	39.76%	574	3.90%	2,437	16.57%	14,709
Klickitat	4,446	53.33%	3,458	41.48%	433	5.19%	988	11.85%	8,337
Lewis	14,839	51.02%	13,008	44.73%	1,235	4.25%	1,831	6.30%	29,082
Lincoln	2,425	46.85%	2,538	49.03%	213	4.12%	-113	-2.18%	5,176
Mason	14,822	63.78%	7,403	31.85%	1,016	4.37%	7,419	31.92%	23,241
Okanogan	7,808	53.10%	6,169	41.95%	727	4.94%	1,639	11.15%	14,704
Pacific	6,400	67.11%	2,795	29.31%	342	3.59%	3,605	37.80%	9,537
Pend Oreille	2,975	52.10%	2,429	42.54%	306	5.36%	546	9.56%	5,710
Pierce	196,761	66.63%	88,129	29.84%	10,417	3.53%	108,632	36.79%	295,307
San Juan	6,303	69.22%	2,334	25.63%	469	5.15%	3,969	43.59%	9,106
Skagit	29,033	59.87%	17,607	36.31%	1,855	3.83%	11,426	23.56%	48,495
Skamania	2,660	56.97%	1,725	36.95%	284	6.08%	935	20.03%	4,669
Snohomish	171,867	63.33%	89,152	32.85%	10,359	3.82%	82,715	30.48%	271,378
Spokane	103,382	55.39%	75,486	40.44%	7,780	4.17%	27,896	14.95%	186,648
Stevens	8,389	45.97%	8,866	48.59%	993	5.44%	-477	-2.61%	18,248
Thurston	71,374	68.72%	28,267	27.21%	4,228	4.07%	43,107	41.50%	103,869
Wahkiakum	1,197	59.88%	704	35.22%	98	4.90%	493	24.66%	1,999
Walla Walla	10,836	51.82%	9,258	44.27%	817	3.91%	1,578	7.55%	20,911
Whatcom	48,451	60.44%	28,462	35.51%	3,250	4.05%	19,989	24.94%	80,163
Whitman	9,129	56.36%	6,355	39.24%	713	4.40%	2,774	17.13%	16,197
Yakima	36,608	53.54%	28,882	42.24%	2,882	4.22%	7,726	11.30%	68,372
Totals	1,668,575	63.89%	841,772	32.23%	101,161	3.87%	826,803	31.66%	2,611,508

Counties that flipped from Republican to Democratic

- Chelan (largest city: Wenatchee)
- Columbia (largest city: Dayton)
- Douglas (largest city: East Wenatchee)
- Ferry (largest city: Republic)
- Lewis (largest city: Centralia)
- Okanogan (largest city: Omak)
- Yakima (largest city: Yakima)
