= David Goldstein =

David Goldstein may refer to:

- David Goldstein (blogger), American blogger and former talk radio host
- David Goldstein (Catholic apologist) (1870–1958), Jewish convert to the Roman Catholic Church
- David B. Goldstein (energy policy expert), American energy conservation policy expert
- David B. Goldstein (geneticist), American human geneticist
- Rupert Holmes (born 1947), born David Goldstein, British-American composer, musician and writer
