= 2008 Washington State Auditor election =

- November 4, 2008
Nominee	Brian Sonntag	Richard "Dick" McEntee
Party	Democratic	Republican
Popular vote	1,770,977	1,016,396
Percentage	63.54%	36.46%
- Sonntag: 50–60% 60–70% 70–80% 80–90% McEntee: 50–60%
State Auditor before election
Brian Sonntag
Democratic
Elected State Auditor
Brian Sonntag
Democratic

The 2008 Washington State Auditor election was held on November 4, 2008, to elect the Washington State Auditor, concurrently with the 2008 U.S. presidential election, as well as elections to the U.S. Senate and various state and local elections, including for U.S. House and governor of Washington. Washington is one of two states that holds a top-two primary, meaning that all candidates are listed on the same ballot regardless of party affiliation, and the top two move on to the general election.

Four-term incumbent Democratic State Auditor Brian Sonntag was re-elected to his fifth and final term in office, defeating Republican Ricard "Dick" McEntee with 64% of the vote. As of 2026, this is the last election where any candidate for state auditor received over 60% of the vote.

The top-two primary was held on August 19.

== Primary election ==
=== Democratic Party ===
==== Advanced to general ====
- Brian Sonntag, incumbent state auditor (1993–2013)

=== Republican Party ===
==== Advanced to general ====
- Richard "Dick" McEntee, business consultant

=== Constitution Party ===
==== Eliminated in primary ====
- Glenn Freeman, chairman of the Washington Constitution Party

=== Endorsements ===
Brian Sonntag (D)

Newspapers

- The Seattle Times

=== Results ===
County results Sonntag: 40–50%; 50–60%; 60–70%; 70–80%; McEntee: 40–50%; 50–60%

Congressional district results Sonntag: 40–50%; 50–60%; 60–70%; 80–90%; McEntee: 40–50%

Blanket primary results
Party	Candidate	Votes	%
Democratic	Brian Sonntag (incumbent)	812,352	59.48
Republican	J. Richard (Dick) McEntee	459,327	33.63
Constitution	Glenn Freeman	94,148	6.89
Total votes		1,365,827	100.00

==== By county ====
County	Brian Sonntag Democratic		J. Richard (Dick) McEntee Republican		Glenn Freeman Constitution		Margin		Total votes cast
County	#	%	#	%	#	%	#	%	Total votes cast
Adams	973	38.67%	1,322	52.54%	221	8.78%	-349	-13.87%	2,516
Asotin	2,594	49.06%	2,216	41.91%	477	9.02%	378	7.15%	5,287
Benton	15,665	41.49%	18,725	49.59%	3,370	8.92%	-3,060	-8.10%	37,760
Chelan	7,940	47.26%	7,693	45.79%	1,166	6.94%	247	1.47%	16,799
Clallam	11,480	52.94%	8,531	39.34%	1,673	7.72%	2,949	13.60%	21,684
Clark	38,538	53.11%	28,472	39.24%	5,549	7.65%	10,066	13.87%	72,559
Columbia	618	43.04%	690	48.05%	128	8.91%	-72	-5.01%	1,436
Cowlitz	12,283	57.04%	7,363	34.19%	1,889	8.77%	4,920	22.85%	21,535
Douglas	3,914	47.04%	3,796	45.62%	610	7.33%	118	1.42%	8,320
Ferry	868	44.08%	878	44.59%	223	11.33%	-10	-0.51%	1,969
Franklin	4,452	41.01%	5,423	49.95%	982	9.04%	-971	-8.94%	10,857
Garfield	320	42.38%	392	51.92%	43	5.70%	-72	-9.54%	755
Grant	5,900	40.25%	7,242	49.41%	1,516	10.34%	-1,342	-9.16%	14,658
Grays Harbor	10,988	64.39%	4,745	27.81%	1,332	7.81%	6,243	36.58%	17,065
Island	13,525	56.52%	8,807	36.80%	1,599	6.68%	4,718	19.72%	23,931
Jefferson	8,528	66.86%	3,473	27.23%	754	5.91%	5,055	39.63%	12,755
King	238,186	70.16%	83,629	24.63%	17,672	5.21%	154,557	45.53%	339,487
Kitsap	38,919	59.91%	21,888	33.69%	4,158	6.40%	17,031	26.22%	64,965
Kittitas	4,851	50.52%	3,993	41.59%	758	7.89%	858	8.94%	9,602
Klickitat	2,560	49.89%	2,110	41.12%	461	8.98%	450	8.77%	5,131
Lewis	8,657	45.59%	8,510	44.82%	1,821	9.59%	147	0.77%	18,988
Lincoln	1,647	43.85%	1,764	46.96%	345	9.19%	-117	-3.12%	3,756
Mason	10,170	60.69%	5,264	31.41%	1,324	7.90%	4,906	29.28%	16,758
Okanogan	4,027	46.71%	3,791	43.97%	804	9.32%	236	2.74%	8,622
Pacific	4,322	64.73%	1,838	27.53%	517	7.74%	2,484	37.20%	6,677
Pend Oreille	1,663	44.29%	1,629	43.38%	463	12.33%	34	0.91%	3,755
Pierce	93,234	63.20%	45,600	30.91%	8,683	5.89%	47,634	32.29%	147,517
San Juan	4,273	65.61%	1,862	28.59%	378	5.80%	2,411	37.02%	6,513
Skagit	16,866	56.88%	10,748	36.25%	2,036	6.87%	6,118	20.63%	29,650
Skamania	1,285	53.39%	892	37.06%	230	9.56%	393	16.33%	2,407
Snohomish	84,724	60.16%	46,152	32.77%	9,957	7.07%	38,572	27.39%	140,833
Spokane	54,761	51.99%	41,215	39.13%	9,355	8.88%	13,546	12.86%	105,331
Stevens	4,955	40.32%	5,745	46.75%	1,590	12.94%	-790	-6.43%	12,290
Thurston	42,394	66.27%	17,819	27.86%	3,756	5.87%	24,575	38.42%	63,969
Wahkiakum	770	56.49%	468	34.34%	125	9.17%	302	22.16%	1,363
Walla Walla	6,167	46.73%	5,985	45.35%	1,044	7.91%	182	1.38%	13,196
Whatcom	26,515	56.75%	17,204	36.82%	3,001	6.42%	9,311	19.93%	46,720
Whitman	4,150	52.04%	3,256	40.83%	569	7.13%	894	11.21%	7,975
Yakima	18,670	46.17%	18,197	45.00%	3,569	8.83%	473	1.17%	40,436
Totals	812,352	59.48%	459,327	33.63%	94,148	6.89%	353,025	25.85%	1,365,827

Counties that flipped from Republican to Democratic

- Chelan (largest city: Wenatchee)
- Douglas (largest city: East Wenatchee)
- Klickitat (largest city: Goldendale)
- Lewis (largest city: Centralia)
- Okanogan (largest city: Omak)
- Yakima (largest city: Yakima)

==== By congressional district ====
District	Sonntag	McEntee	Freeman	Representative
1st	64%	30%	6%	Jay Inslee
2nd	57%	35%	7%	Rick Larsen
3rd	57%	36%	8%	Brian Baird
4th	45%	47%	9%	Doc Hastings
5th	50%	41%	9%	Cathy McMorris Rodgers
6th	63%	30%	6%	Norm Dicks
7th	82%	14%	4%	Jim McDermott
8th	60%	34%	6%	Dave Reichert
9th	63%	31%	6%	Adam Smith

== General election ==
=== Results ===
2008 Washington State Auditor election
Party	Candidate	Votes	%	±%
Democratic	Brian Sonntag (incumbent)	1,770,977	63.54	–0.35
Republican	J. Richard (Dick) McEntee	1,016,396	36.46	+4.23
Total votes		2,787,373	100.00	N/A
Democratic hold				

==== By county ====
County results
County	Brian Sonntag Democratic		J. Richard (Dick) McEntee Republican		Margin		Total votes
County	#	%	#	%	#	%	Total votes
Adams	1,935	43.44%	2,519	56.56%	-584	-13.11%	4,454
Asotin	4,559	50.18%	4,527	49.82%	32	0.35%	9,086
Benton	30,868	45.25%	37,356	54.75%	-6,488	-9.51%	68,224
Chelan	15,101	50.79%	14,632	49.21%	469	1.58%	29,733
Clallam	19,974	56.66%	15,279	43.34%	4,695	13.32%	35,253
Clark	94,216	55.61%	75,201	44.39%	19,015	11.22%	169,417
Columbia	960	46.92%	1,086	53.08%	-126	-6.16%	2,046
Cowlitz	25,017	59.81%	16,811	40.19%	8,206	19.62%	41,828
Douglas	6,940	49.01%	7,219	50.99%	-279	-1.97%	14,159
Ferry	1,596	49.49%	1,629	50.51%	-33	-1.02%	3,225
Franklin	8,550	45.75%	10,140	54.25%	-1,590	-8.51%	18,690
Garfield	548	43.56%	710	56.44%	-162	-12.88%	1,258
Grant	11,150	43.54%	14,458	56.46%	-3,308	-12.92%	25,608
Grays Harbor	18,257	66.28%	9,288	33.72%	8,969	32.56%	27,545
Island	22,550	58.30%	16,131	41.70%	6,419	16.59%	38,681
Jefferson	13,108	70.48%	5,490	29.52%	7,618	40.96%	18,598
King	605,331	73.85%	214,326	26.15%	391,005	47.70%	819,657
Kitsap	72,292	61.86%	44,569	38.14%	27,723	23.72%	116,861
Kittitas	8,763	53.53%	7,606	46.47%	1,157	7.07%	16,369
Klickitat	5,075	54.54%	4,230	45.46%	845	9.08%	9,305
Lewis	16,552	51.36%	15,673	48.64%	879	2.73%	32,225
Lincoln	2,459	45.13%	2,990	54.87%	-531	-9.74%	5,449
Mason	17,052	63.81%	9,670	36.19%	7,382	27.63%	26,722
Okanogan	8,258	53.16%	7,276	46.84%	982	6.32%	15,534
Pacific	6,867	66.83%	3,409	33.17%	3,458	33.65%	10,276
Pend Oreille	2,980	48.96%	3,107	51.04%	-127	-2.09%	6,087
Pierce	200,319	64.97%	107,998	35.03%	92,321	29.94%	308,317
San Juan	6,851	70.72%	2,836	29.28%	4,015	41.45%	9,687
Skagit	31,459	60.57%	20,475	39.43%	10,984	21.15%	51,934
Skamania	2,851	56.60%	2,186	43.40%	665	13.20%	5,037
Snohomish	191,555	64.00%	107,751	36.00%	83,804	28.00%	299,306
Spokane	111,063	54.83%	91,503	45.17%	19,560	9.66%	202,566
Stevens	9,179	44.34%	11,521	55.66%	-2,342	-11.31%	20,700
Thurston	80,844	68.36%	37,410	31.64%	43,434	36.73%	118,254
Wahkiakum	1,274	60.26%	840	39.74%	434	20.53%	2,114
Walla Walla	11,402	50.43%	11,209	49.57%	193	0.85%	22,611
Whatcom	56,309	61.19%	35,712	38.81%	20,597	22.38%	92,021
Whitman	9,060	56.63%	6,939	43.37%	2,121	13.26%	15,999
Yakima	37,853	52.18%	34,684	47.82%	3,169	4.37%	72,537
Totals	1,770,977	63.54%	1,016,396	36.46%	754,581	27.07%	2,787,373

Counties that flipped from Democratic to Republican

- Columbia (largest city: Dayton)
- Douglas (largest city: East Wenatchee)
- Ferry (largest city: Republic)
- Pend Oreille (largest city: Newport)

==== By congressional district ====
Sonntag won eight of nine congressional districts, including two that elected Republicans.

District	Sonntag	McEntee	Representative
1st	67%	33%	Jay Inslee
2nd	61%	39%	Rick Larsen
3rd	59%	41%	Brian Baird
4th	49%	51%	Doc Hastings
5th	53%	47%	Cathy McMorris Rodgers
6th	66%	34%	Norm Dicks
7th	85%	15%	Jim McDermott
8th	63%	37%	Dave Reichert
9th	66%	34%	Adam Smith
