= 2019 Washington Initiative 976 =

Initiative 976
- November 5, 2019
- Limits on Motor Vehicle Taxes and Fees Measure

Results
Choice	Votes	%
Yes	1,055,749	52.99%
No	936,751	47.01%
Total votes	1,992,500	100.00%

Yes
90–100%
80–90%
70–80%
60–70%
50–60%
No
90–100%
80–90%
70–80%
60–70%
50–60%
Other
Tie
No data
- Results as of November 26, 2019

Initiative Measure No. 976 (I-976) is a ballot initiative in the U.S. state of Washington that appeared on the ballot on November 5, 2019. The initiative was brought to the state legislature by a petition sponsored by Tim Eyman. The initiative would cap taxes on certain cars at $30 and put an end to transportation benefit districts and other local vehicle taxes. The campaign in favor of the initiative was led by Tim Eyman, Permanent Offense, and Voters Want More Choices, while the campaign against the initiative was led by the Northwest Progressive Institute. Opponents of the initiative fear that its passage would take away money from ongoing transportation projects, including voter-approved measures, such as Sound Transit 3, while supporters claim that the initiative would end assessing practices that they claim are dishonest. The practices include using out-dated fee schedules for assessing vehicles. Unsuccessful attempts were made to require the use of more recent fee schedules in the state legislature.

The ballot measure was passed, with 53 percent of voters in favor at the time of certification. The governments of Seattle and King County, along with other groups from across the state, announced plans to halt the initiative through legal action, disputing the ballot language as "misleading to voters". A judge in the King County Superior Court issued a temporary injunction in November 2019.

In February 2020, the King County Superior Court largely upheld I-976, but kept the measure on hold pending a ruling from the Washington State Supreme Court. In October, Washington State Supreme Court struck down the initiative on constitutional grounds because it "contain[ed] more than one subject and its subject is not accurately expressed in its title".

== Results ==
Initiative 976 was approved with 53% of the vote.

2019 Washington Initiative 976
Choice	Votes	%
For	1,055,749	52.99
Against	936,751	47.01
Total	1,992,500	100.00
Source: Washington Secretary of State

=== By county ===
County results
County	Yes		No		Margin		Total votes
County	#	%	#	%	#	%	Total votes
Adams	2,030	70.93%	832	29.07%	1,198	41.86%	2,862
Asotin	4,080	64.57%	2,239	35.43%	1,841	29.13%	6,319
Benton	29,814	66.93%	14,733	33.07%	15,081	33.85%	44,547
Chelan	13,702	61.28%	8,657	38.72%	5,045	22.56%	22,359
Clallam	13,992	50.74%	13,584	49.26%	408	1.48%	27,576
Clark	63,104	60.79%	40,695	39.21%	22,409	21.59%	103,799
Columbia	918	58.92%	640	41.08%	278	17.84%	1,558
Cowlitz	20,766	71.82%	8,149	28.18%	12,617	43.63%	28,915
Douglas	7,117	68.11%	3,333	31.89%	3,784	36.21%	10,450
Ferry	1,795	72.82%	670	27.18%	1,125	45.64%	2,465
Franklin	8,953	72.21%	3,446	27.79%	5,507	44.41%	12,399
Garfield	590	57.45%	437	42.55%	153	14.90%	1,027
Grant	12,492	72.84%	4,657	27.16%	7,835	45.69%	17,149
Grays Harbor	12,793	63.18%	7,456	36.82%	5,337	26.36%	20,249
Island	14,770	49.41%	15,121	50.59%	-351	-1.17%	29,891
Jefferson	5,876	39.61%	8,959	60.39%	-3,083	-20.78%	14,835
King	255,529	40.53%	374,974	59.47%	-119,445	-18.94%	630,503
Kitsap	38,070	50.18%	37,793	49.82%	277	0.37%	75,863
Kittitas	8,475	64.48%	4,669	35.52%	3,806	28.96%	13,144
Klickitat	4,293	65.77%	2,234	34.23%	2,059	31.55%	6,527
Lewis	16,183	71.24%	6,532	28.76%	9,651	42.49%	22,715
Lincoln	2,867	69.77%	1,242	30.23%	1,625	39.55%	4,109
Mason	12,254	63.62%	7,007	36.38%	5,247	27.24%	19,261
Okanogan	7,180	65.06%	3,856	34.94%	3,324	30.12%	11,036
Pacific	4,715	62.82%	2,790	37.18%	1,925	25.65%	7,505
Pend Oreille	3,194	70.18%	1,357	29.82%	1,837	40.36%	4,551
Pierce	134,604	65.75%	70,102	34.25%	64,502	31.51%	204,706
San Juan	2,300	29.52%	5,491	70.48%	-3,191	-40.96%	7,791
Skagit	20,496	53.42%	17,869	46.58%	2,627	6.85%	38,365
Skamania	2,339	65.54%	1,230	34.46%	1,109	31.07%	3,569
Snohomish	115,602	58.21%	82,987	41.79%	32,615	16.42%	198,589
Spokane	83,399	54.27%	70,266	45.73%	13,133	8.55%	153,665
Stevens	10,646	71.25%	4,296	28.75%	6,350	42.50%	14,942
Thurston	39,117	47.88%	42,589	52.12%	-3,472	-4.25%	81,706
Wahkiakum	1,093	68.66%	499	31.34%	594	37.31%	1,592
Walla Walla	9,216	60.99%	5,894	39.01%	3,322	21.99%	15,110
Whatcom	37,062	46.11%	43,317	53.89%	-6,255	-7.78%	80,379
Whitman	5,294	50.91%	5,104	49.09%	190	1.83%	10,398
Yakima	29,029	72.44%	11,045	27.56%	17,984	44.88%	40,074
Totals	1,055,749	52.99%	936,751	47.01%	118,998	5.97%	1,992,500
