= 2012 Washington Initiative 1185 =

Referendum on taxation

Initiative 1185
- A measure requiring that legislative action to raise taxes without a vote of the people require a supermajority vote.

Results
Choice	Votes	%
Yes	1,892,969	63.91%
No	1,069,083	36.09%
Valid votes	2,962,052	100.00%
Invalid or blank votes	0	0.00%
Total votes	2,962,052	100.00%

Yes
90–100%
80–90%
70–80%
60–70%
50–60%
No
90–100%
80–90%
70–80%
60–70%
50–60%
Other
Tie
No data

Washington Initiative 1185 was a 2012 initiative in Washington state. It passed with 63.91% of the vote, but portions were declared unconstitutional in February 2013.

== Ballot measure title and summary ==
The full text of the measure is available online. As described by the Secretary of State's office, I-1185 "concerns tax and fee increases imposed by state government."

This measure would restate existing statutory requirements that legislative actions raising taxes must be approved by two-thirds legislative majorities or receive voter approval, and that new or increased fees require majority legislative approval.

Should this measure be enacted into law? Yes [ ] No [ ]

This measure would restate the existing statutory requirement that any action or combination of actions by the legislature that raises taxes must be approved by two-thirds vote in both houses of the legislature, or be approved in a referendum to the people. It would restate the existing statutory definition of "raises taxes," restate the requirement that new or increased fees must be approved by majority vote in both houses of the legislature, and correct statutory references.

== Support and opposition ==
Statements for and against each ballot measure are also available online as part of the official online voter's guide. As per RCW 42.17A on "campaign disclosure and contribution," the Washington State Public Disclosure Commission also posts campaign information online, including information for referendums and initiatives

The primary sponsor registered for I-1185 was Tim Eyman, who proposed 25 initiatives for 2012. Additional sponsors were Leo J. Fagan and M.J. Fagan. Approximately 95% of the money to support the initiative was reportedly from "corporate behemoths such as oil companies ... the national beer and soda-pop industries and big pharmaceutical firms."

== Results ==
Initiative 1185 was approved with 64% of the vote.

2012 Washington Initiative 1185
Choice	Votes	%
For	1,892,969	63.91
Against	1,069,083	36.09
Total	2,962,052	100.00
Source: Washington Secretary of State

=== By county ===
County results
County	Yes		No		Margin		Total votes
County	#	%	#	%	#	%	Total votes
Adams	3,313	71.88%	1,296	28.12%	2,017	43.76%	4,609
Asotin	6,812	72.05%	2,643	27.95%	4,169	44.09%	9,455
Benton	56,547	73.83%	20,048	26.17%	36,499	47.65%	76,595
Chelan	22,498	72.98%	8,330	27.02%	14,168	45.96%	30,828
Clallam	25,573	69.97%	10,976	30.03%	14,597	39.94%	36,549
Clark	126,267	70.39%	53,124	29.61%	73,143	40.77%	179,391
Columbia	1,573	71.79%	618	28.21%	955	43.59%	2,191
Cowlitz	30,383	71.00%	12,412	29.00%	17,971	41.99%	42,795
Douglas	10,746	75.35%	3,516	24.65%	7,230	50.69%	14,262
Ferry	2,492	74.63%	847	25.37%	1,645	49.27%	3,339
Franklin	15,861	71.99%	6,172	28.01%	9,689	43.97%	22,033
Garfield	921	76.30%	286	23.70%	635	52.61%	1,207
Grant	19,771	74.71%	6,693	25.29%	13,078	49.42%	26,464
Grays Harbor	19,578	70.96%	8,012	29.04%	11,566	41.92%	27,590
Island	27,277	67.43%	13,173	32.57%	14,104	34.87%	40,450
Jefferson	10,203	54.11%	8,653	45.89%	1,550	8.22%	18,856
King	485,998	54.26%	409,717	45.74%	76,281	8.52%	895,715
Kitsap	76,878	64.43%	42,433	35.57%	34,445	28.87%	119,311
Kittitas	12,096	70.00%	5,183	30.00%	6,913	40.01%	17,279
Klickitat	6,562	66.99%	3,233	33.01%	3,329	33.99%	9,795
Lewis	25,232	76.49%	7,757	23.51%	17,475	52.97%	32,989
Lincoln	4,236	74.87%	1,422	25.13%	2,814	49.73%	5,658
Mason	19,814	72.93%	7,355	27.07%	12,459	45.86%	27,169
Okanogan	11,259	70.05%	4,813	29.95%	6,446	40.11%	16,072
Pacific	7,008	69.86%	3,023	30.14%	3,985	39.73%	10,031
Pend Oreille	4,789	74.28%	1,658	25.72%	3,131	48.57%	6,447
Pierce	226,306	68.74%	102,896	31.26%	123,410	37.49%	329,202
San Juan	5,033	50.24%	4,984	49.76%	49	0.49%	10,017
Skagit	35,058	66.22%	17,880	33.78%	17,178	32.45%	52,938
Skamania	3,611	69.76%	1,565	30.24%	2,046	39.53%	5,176
Snohomish	210,498	66.76%	104,806	33.24%	105,692	33.52%	315,304
Spokane	151,147	70.14%	64,338	29.86%	86,809	40.29%	215,485
Stevens	16,505	75.99%	5,214	24.01%	11,291	51.99%	21,719
Thurston	72,694	59.74%	48,989	40.26%	23,705	19.48%	121,683
Wahkiakum	1,438	67.64%	688	32.36%	750	35.28%	2,126
Walla Walla	16,753	69.99%	7,182	30.01%	9,571	39.99%	23,935
Whatcom	58,529	60.42%	38,343	39.58%	20,186	20.84%	96,872
Whitman	10,009	61.81%	6,184	38.19%	3,825	23.62%	16,193
Yakima	51,701	69.56%	22,621	30.44%	29,080	39.13%	74,322
Totals	1,892,969	63.91%	1,069,083	36.09%	823,886	27.81%	2,962,052
