= Will Baker =

American politician (born 1965)

William T. Baker (born January 19, 1965) is an American perennial candidate from Tacoma, Washington.

Baker, described by the Tacoma News Tribune as "a roadside flower salesman with a history of annoying elected officials," has run for Pierce County Auditor, Washington state Auditor, United States Senator, Tacoma City Council, and mayor of Tacoma, among other offices, but has never won a contest. He has been repeatedly arrested for speaking past his allotted time during public comment periods of the Tacoma city council, then refusing to yield the floor. On one occasion, in 1997, he continued his monologue after being booked into the Pierce County jail, even refusing to stop after jail guards left the door to his cell open "hoping he'd leave." (According to another report of that incident, Baker refused to leave jail after having bail posted by an acquaintance as he'd learned his landlord had evicted him. Sheriff Mark French attempted to convince Baker to leave jail, but Baker chose to remain in his cell.)

In the 2004 race for state auditor, the Washington State Republican Party nominated Baker as their candidate after efforts to recruit someone else failed, though later admitted they were unaware of his colorful past and had not properly vetted him. (Under Washington elections law at the time, candidates listing party affiliation had to have received endorsement from the party in question; under current state elections law candidates can list affiliation with any party whether approved by that party or not.) Another Washington perennial candidate, Richard Pope, attempted - unsuccessfully - to have Baker removed from the ballot. Baker ultimately lost the election with 32-percent of the vote.

Baker's frequent electoral campaigns have been motivated by what he's explained is institutional corruption that has engulfed Tacoma municipal and Washington state government. In the 2004 election for Auditor he declared the "number one issue ... ought to be the attempts by the FBI to cover up the events surrounding Crystal Brame’s murder" (David Brame was a Tacoma chief of police who murdered his wife, Crystal, before killing himself) while, in his 2010 run for United States senator, he opined that "Secretary of State Sam Reed and several County Auditors are manipulating the 2010 U.S. Senate election."
