= Neal Cheetham =

4th Auditor of Washington

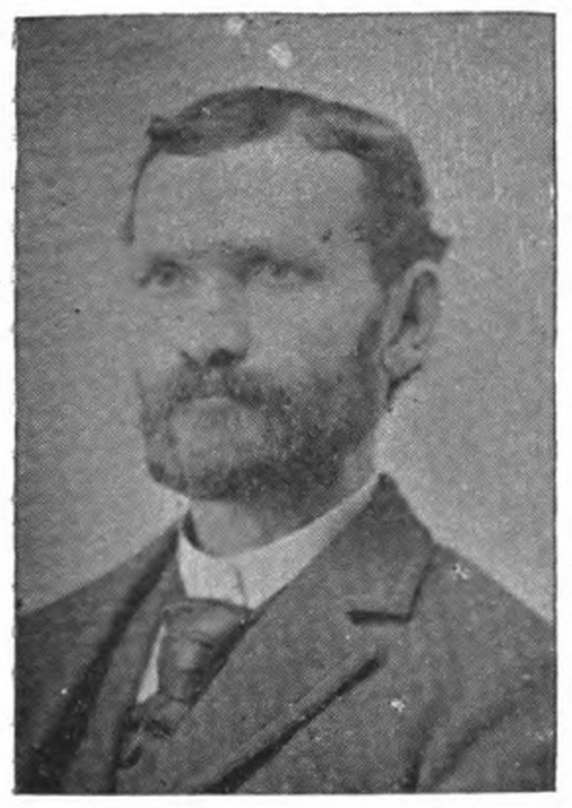
- Cheetham in 1895

4th Auditor of Washington
- In office January 13, 1897 – January 16, 1901
- Governor: John Rankin Rogers
- Preceded by: John E. Frost
- Succeeded by: John D. Atkinson

Member of the Washington House of Representatives for the 6th district
- In office 1895–1897

Personal details
- Born: February 10, 1845 Pittsburgh, Pennsylvania, U.S.
- Died: January 28, 1917 (aged 71) Tacoma, Washington, U.S.
- Party: Populist
- Occupation: Minister

Neal Cheetham (February 10, 1845 – January 28, 1917) was an American politician in the state of Washington. He served in the Washington House of Representatives from 1895 to 1897.
