= David Goldstein (blogger) =

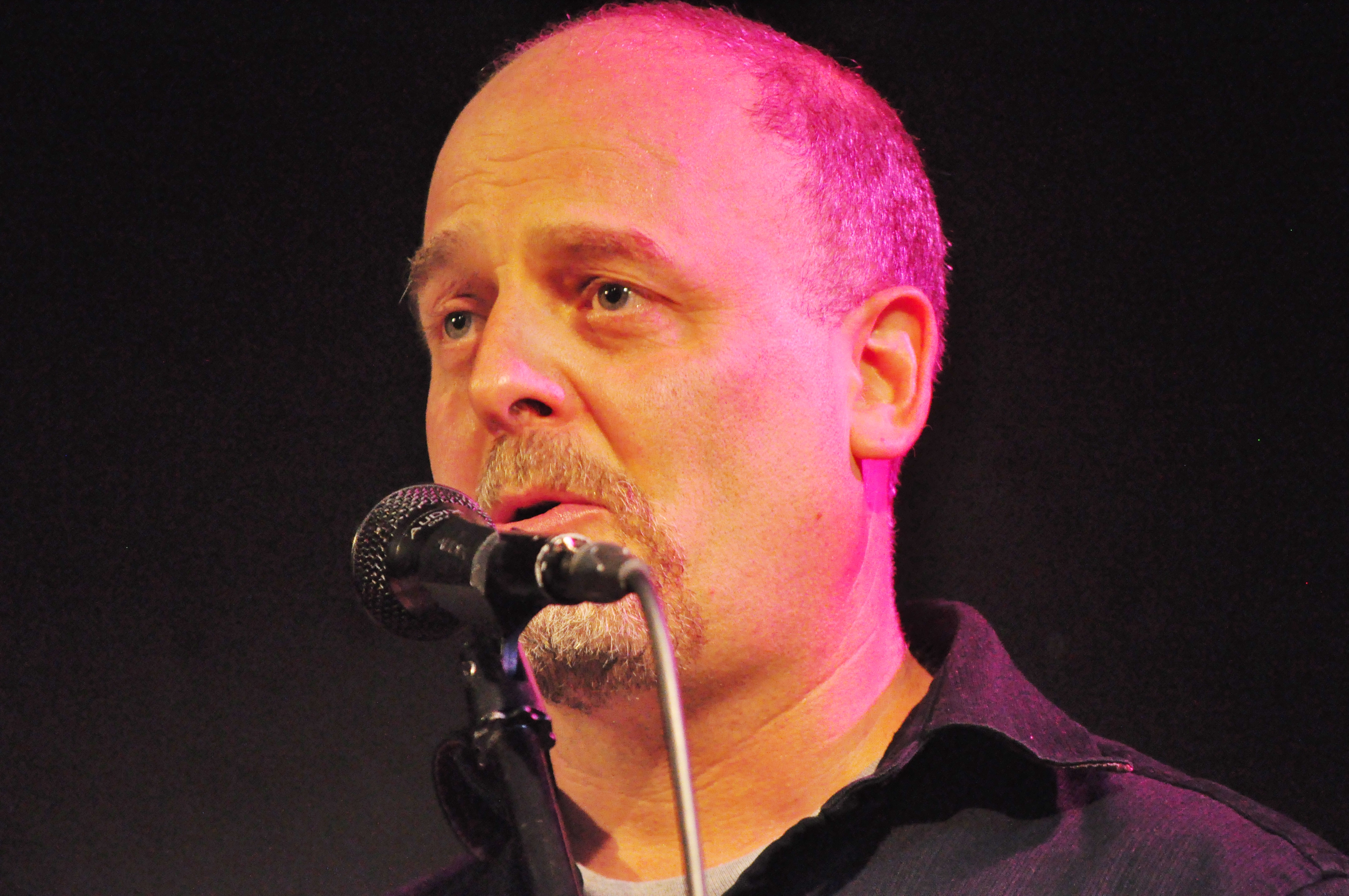
David Goldstein, 2014

David "Goldy" Goldstein is an American blogger and former talk radio host in Seattle, Washington. From 2006 to 2008, he hosted The David Goldstein Show on Saturdays and Sundays on 710 KIRO. Goldstein first gained notoriety in 2003 for Initiative 831, which would have officially proclaimed Washington State political activist Tim Eyman a "Horse's Ass." Goldstein declared that he was attempting to parody the initiative process to highlight its shortcomings and problems. Goldstein would claim the initiative got between "5,000 and 7,000" signatures before it died in court after a challenge by the state Attorney General, Christine Gregoire.

== Horse’s Ass ==
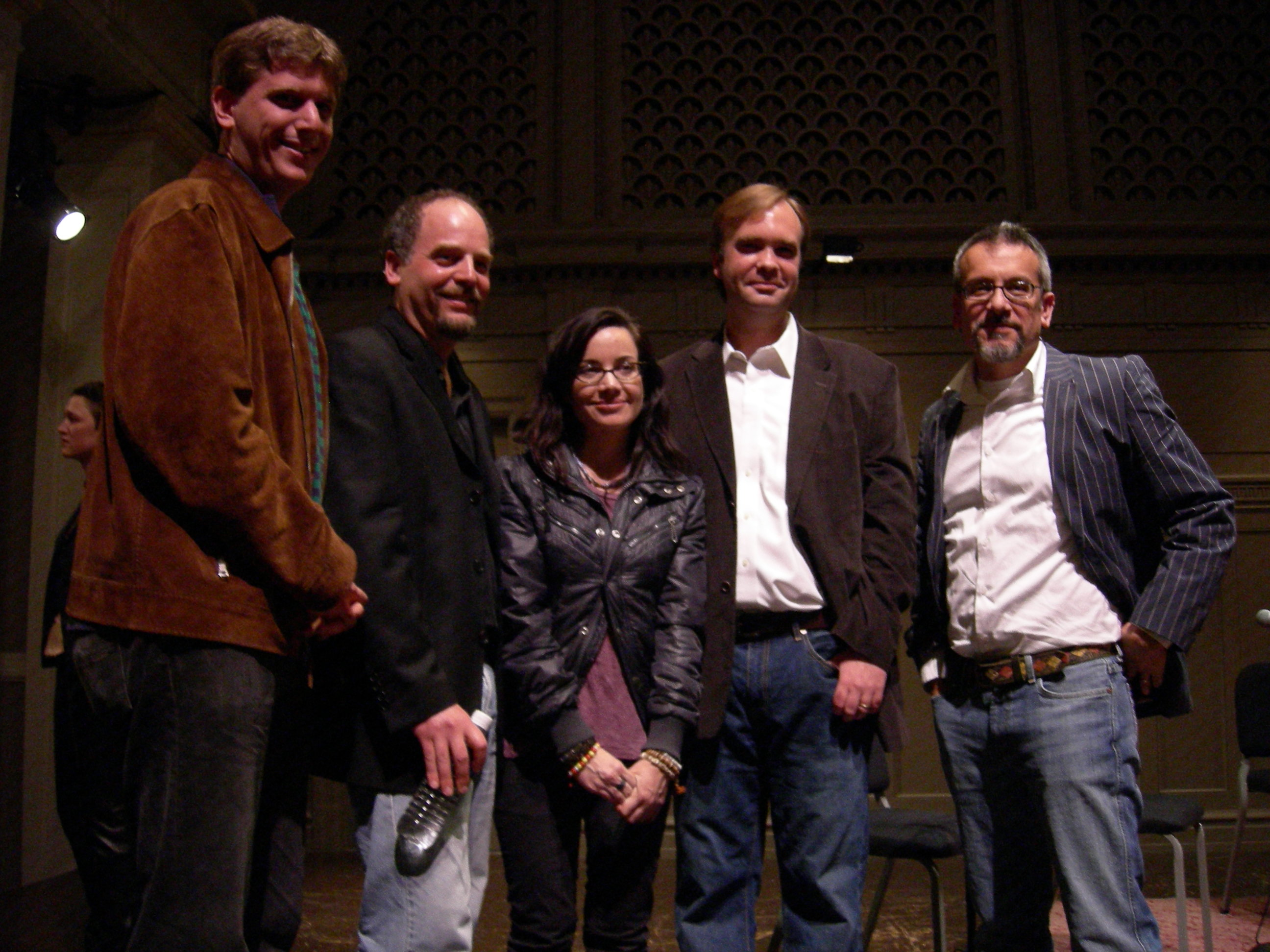
Goldstein (second from left). At left is Matt Stoller. The others (left to right) are Janeane Garofalo, Duncan Black (Atrios), and David Postman (Seattle Times). October 2006.

In May 2004, Goldstein relaunched HorsesAss.org as a blog and it quickly became one of the most widely read liberal political blogs in Washington State. During the aftermath of Hurricane Katrina and criticism of FEMA's response to the hurricane, HorsesAss.org became nationally known for breaking the story that then-FEMA Director Michael Brown's previous work experience was overseeing judges and stewards for 11 years at the International Arabian Horse Association. On September 27, 2005, Brown publicly blamed Goldstein's blog for precipitating his ouster during his testimony before the Congressional investigation into how Katrina was handled.

== Launch of Publicola.net ==
In April 2009, Goldstein helped local political writer Josh Feit launch an Internet news site named after Roman Consul Publicola.

== Awards and honors ==
Goldstein was the recipient of a 2009 Fuse "Sizzle" Award. He was given the Spotlight on the Shadows Sizzle Award "for journalism that matters." According to the awarding organization, Goldstein's a"progressive muckraking and political analysis... keep legislators honest and provide the information and analysis we all need to recognize great leadership and hold legislators accountable."
