= Troy Kelley =

10th Auditor of Washington

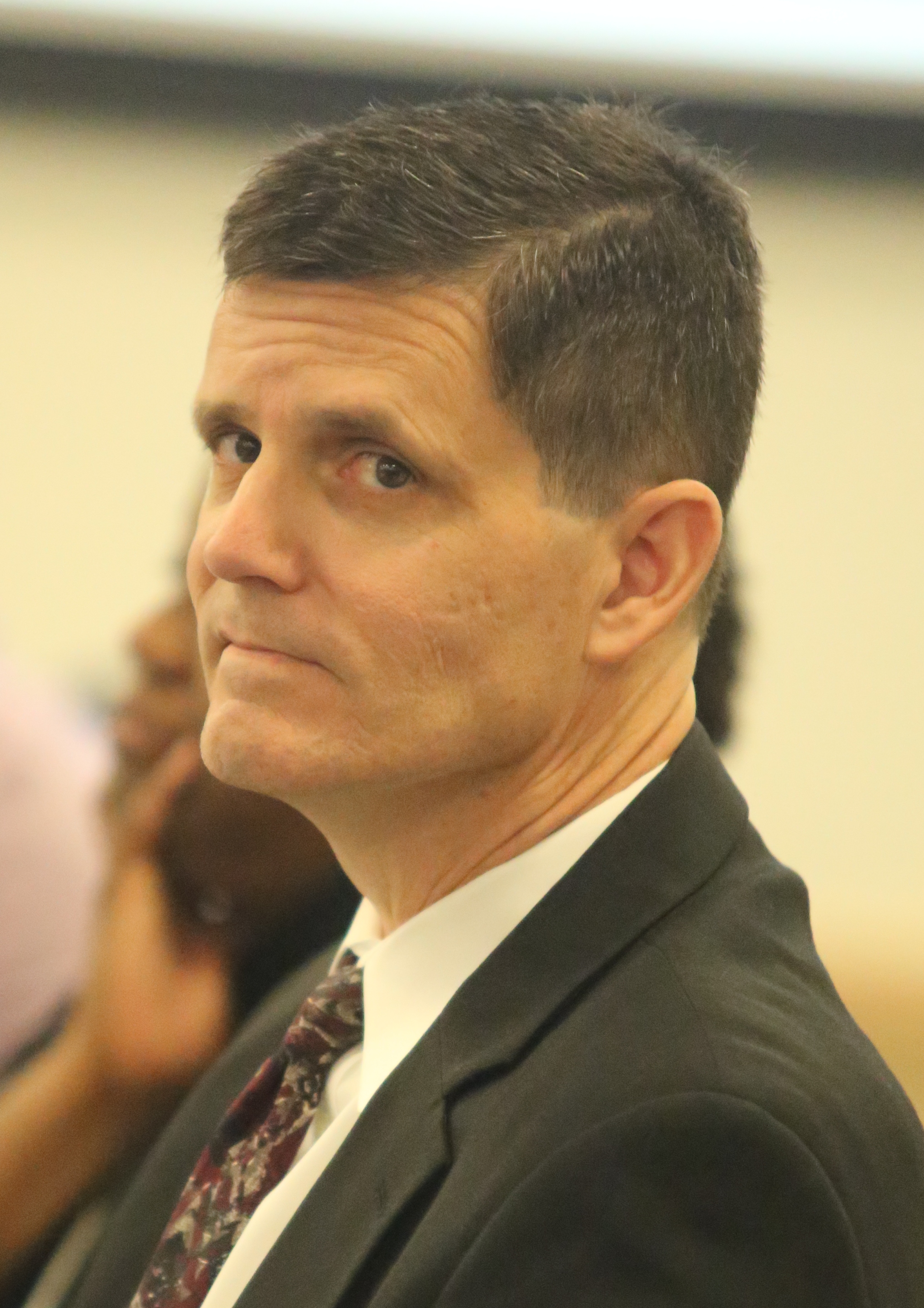
- Kelley in 2015

10th Auditor of Washington
- In office January 16, 2013 – January 11, 2017
- Governor: Jay Inslee
- Preceded by: Brian Sonntag
- Succeeded by: Pat McCarthy

Member of the Washington House of Representatives from the 28th district
- In office January 8, 2007 – January 14, 2013
- Preceded by: Gigi Talcott
- Succeeded by: Steve O'Ban

Personal details
- Born: Troy Xavier Kelley; 1964 (age 61–62) Los Angeles, California, U.S.
- Party: Democratic
- Spouse: Diane Kelley
- Education: University of California, Berkeley (BA); State University of New York, Buffalo (JD, MBA)
- Website: Official website

Military service
- Allegiance: United States
- Branch/service: United States Army
- Years of service: 1994–present
- Rank: Lieutenant Colonel
- Unit: Army Reserve

Troy Xavier Kelley (born 1964) is an American attorney, businessman, and politician who served as the 10th Washington State Auditor from 2013 to 2017, and is a member of the Democratic Party. He is a lieutenant colonel JAG officer in the Washington National Guard. Kelley was a member of the Washington House of Representatives, representing the 28th Legislative District from 2007 to 2013. In 2017 he was convicted of multiple counts of possession of stolen property, making false declarations in a court proceeding and tax fraud.

He was elected as Washington State Auditor in 2012 and was indicted by the United States Department of Justice for mortgage fraud and related crimes in early 2015. At the end of his first trial on April 26, 2016, he was acquitted of one charge of making false statements. The jury deadlocked on the remaining counts. The trial ended in a mistrial on 14 of the 15 counts. At the end of his retrial on December 20, 2017, he was acquitted of five charges of money laundering, and convicted of nine felony charges including counts of possession of stolen property, making false declarations in a court proceeding and tax fraud. On April 26, 2018, in response to a motion by the defense, prosecutors conceded the count of conviction for corrupt interference with an IRS investigation should be dismissed after the U.S. Supreme Court ruled the government’s theory was contrary to the law. On June 29, 2018, Kelley was sentenced to a year and a day in jail, plus a year's probation. A request for forfeiture of $1.4 million was rejected by the judge and a hearing on restitution was scheduled for September 2018. On July 29, 2020, a three judge panel on the Ninth Circuit Court of Appeals upheld Kelley's conviction. The United States Supreme Court denied Kelley's appeal and Kelley began serving his 1-year sentence in July 2021. Kelley was disbarred by order of the Washington State Supreme Court on August 29, 2024.

== Electoral history ==
Washington State Auditor, General Election 2012
Party	Candidate	Votes	%	±%
Democratic	Troy Kelley	1,512,620	52.95	
Republican	James Watkins	1,344,137	47.05	

Washington State Auditor, Primary Election 2012
Party	Candidate	Votes	%	±%
Republican	James Watkins	584,444	46.09	
Democratic	Troy Kelley	291,335	22.98	
Democratic	Craig Pridemore	268,220	21.15	
Democratic	Mark Miloscia	123,936	9.77	

Washington's 28th Legislative District State Representative, Pos. 1, General Election 2010
Party	Candidate	Votes	%	±%
Democratic	Troy Kelley (Incumbent)	21,347	52.87	−7.33
Republican	Steve O'Ban	19,026	47.13	

Washington's 28th Legislative District State Representative, Pos. 1, Primary Election 2010
Party	Candidate	Votes	%	±%
Democratic	Troy Kelley (Incumbent)	12,056	50.26	−6.99
Republican	Steve O'Ban	11,932	49.74	

Washington's 28th Legislative District State Representative, Pos. 1, General Election 2008
Party	Candidate	Votes	%	±%
Democratic	Troy Kelley (Incumbent)	28,591	60.20	+8.54
Republican	Dave Dooley	18,906	39.80	

Washington's 28th Legislative District State Representative, Pos. 1, Primary Election 2008
Party	Candidate	Votes	%	±%
Democratic	Troy Kelley (Incumbent)	14,286	57.25	−42.75
Republican	Dave Dooley	10,669	42.75	

Washington's 28th Legislative District State Representative, Pos. 1, General Election 2006
Party	Candidate	Votes	%	±%
Democratic	Troy Kelley	17,752	51.66	
Republican	Donald Anderson	16,613	48.34	

Washington's 28th Legislative District State Representative, Pos. 1, Democratic Primary Election 2006
Party	Candidate	Votes	%	±%
Democratic	Troy Kelley	9,766	100.00	

United States Representative, California's 49th Congressional District, Democratic Primary Election 1992
Party	Candidate	Votes	%	±%
Democratic	Lynn Schenk	32,303	53.26	
Democratic	Byron Georgiou	14,879	24.53	
Democratic	Bill Winston	6,811	11.23	
Democratic	Carol Lucke	4,594	7.57	
Democratic	Troy X. Kelley	2,066	3.41	

Political offices
Preceded by Brian Sonntag	Auditor of Washington; 2013–2017	Succeeded by Pat McCarthy
