= 2012 Washington State Auditor election =

- November 6, 2012
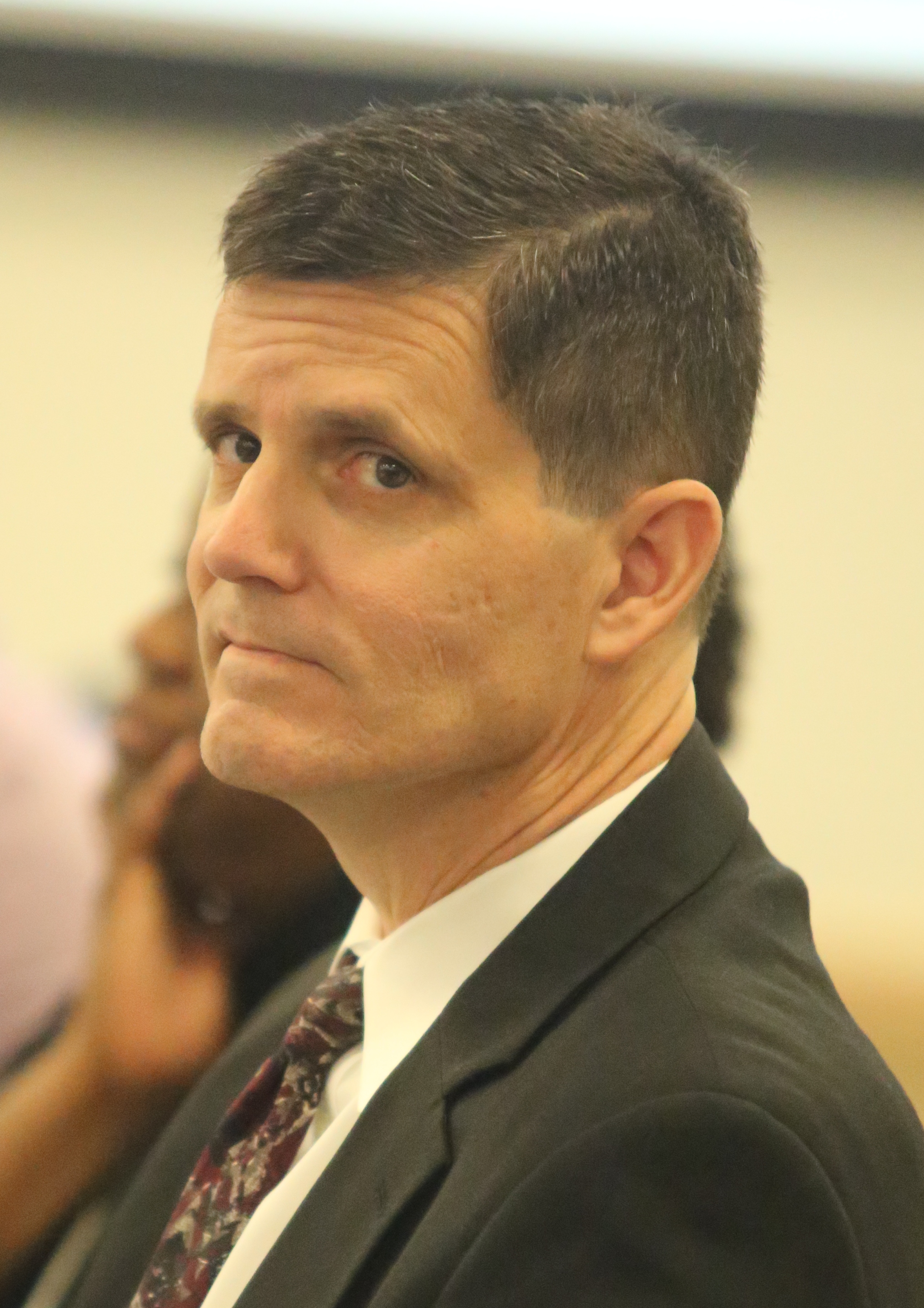

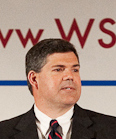
Nominee	Troy Kelley	James Watkins
Party	Democratic	Republican
Popular vote	1,512,620	1,344,137
Percentage	52.95%	47.05%
- Kelley: 50–60% 60–70% 70–80% Watkins: 50–60% 60–70% 70–80%
State Auditor before election
Brian Sonntag
Democratic
Elected State Auditor
Troy Kelley
Democratic

The 2012 Washington State Auditor election was held on November 6, 2012, to elect the Washington State Auditor, concurrently with the 2012 U.S. presidential election, as well as elections to the U.S. Senate and various state and local elections, including for U.S. House and governor of Washington. Washington is one of two states that holds a top-two primary, meaning that all candidates are listed on the same ballot regardless of party affiliation, and the top two move on to the general election.

Five-term incumbent Democratic State Auditor Brian Sonntag retired. Democratic state Representative Troy Kelley defeated Republican James Watkins to succeed Sonntag.

The top-two primary was held on August 7.

== Primary election ==
=== Democratic Party ===
==== Advanced to general ====
- Troy Kelley, state representative (2007–2013)

==== Eliminated in primary ====
- Mark Miloscia, state representative (1999–2013)
- Craig Pridemore, state senator (2005–2013)

==== Declined ====
- Brian Sonntag, incumbent state auditor (1993–2013)

=== Republican Party ===
==== Advanced to general ====
- James Watkins, business consultant and candidate for Washington's 1st congressional district in 2010

=== Endorsements ===
Troy Kelley (D)

Newspapers

- The Seattle Times (co-endorsement with Watkins)
James Watkins (R)

Newspapers

- The Seattle Times (co-endorsement with Kelley)
Declined to endorse

Statewide officials

- Brian Sonntag, state auditor of Washington (1993–2013) (Democratic)

=== Results ===
County results Watkins: 30–40%; 40–50%; 50–60%; 60–70%; 70–80%

Congressional district results Watkins: 30–40%; 40–50%; 50–60%; 60–70%; Pridemore: 40–50%

Blanket primary results
Party	Candidate	Votes	%
Republican	James Watkins	584,444	46.09
Democratic	Troy Kelley	291,335	22.98
Democratic	Craig Pridemore	268,220	21.15
Democratic	Mark Miloscia	123,936	9.77
Total votes		1,267,935	100.00

==== By county ====
Combined partisan vote by county Democratic: 50–60%; 60–70%; Republican: 50–60%; 60–70%; 70–80%

Combined partisan vote by congressional district Democratic: 50–60%; 60–70%; 70–80%; Republican: 50–60%; 60–70%

County results
County	Troy Kelley Democratic		James Watkins Republican		Craig Pridemore Democratic		Mark Miloscia Democratic		Margin		Total votes
County	#	%	#	%	#	%	#	%	#	%	Total votes
Adams	407	16.95%	1,737	72.34%	167	6.96%	90	3.75%	1,330	55.39%	2,401
Asotin	1,021	22.46%	2,643	58.15%	578	12.72%	303	6.67%	1,622	35.69%	4,545
Benton	4,458	15.21%	19,753	67.40%	3,480	11.88%	1,614	5.51%	15,295	52.19%	29,305
Chelan	2,719	17.53%	10,083	65.02%	1,926	12.42%	780	5.03%	7,364	47.49%	15,508
Clallam	3,700	20.37%	9,927	54.66%	3,085	16.99%	1,451	7.99%	6,227	34.28%	18,163
Clark	6,890	10.31%	32,668	48.89%	24,133	36.12%	3,124	4.68%	8,535	12.77%	66,815
Columbia	141	13.70%	722	70.17%	103	10.01%	63	6.12%	581	56.46%	1,029
Cowlitz	4,086	23.25%	8,587	48.86%	3,557	20.24%	1,344	7.65%	4,501	25.61%	17,574
Douglas	1,211	17.29%	4,717	67.35%	717	10.24%	359	5.13%	3,506	50.06%	7,004
Ferry	298	18.72%	996	62.56%	196	12.31%	102	6.41%	698	43.84%	1,592
Franklin	1,411	16.18%	5,988	68.65%	891	10.21%	433	4.96%	4,577	52.47%	8,723
Garfield	92	16.43%	400	71.43%	38	6.79%	30	5.36%	308	55.00%	560
Grant	2,052	17.44%	7,918	67.30%	1,182	10.05%	613	5.21%	5,866	49.86%	11,765
Grays Harbor	3,567	27.18%	5,873	44.76%	2,472	18.84%	1,210	9.22%	2,306	17.57%	13,122
Island	4,598	21.99%	10,894	52.10%	3,914	18.72%	1,505	7.20%	6,296	30.11%	20,911
Jefferson	2,379	22.81%	4,068	39.00%	3,119	29.90%	864	8.28%	949	9.10%	10,430
King	96,000	25.34%	127,160	33.57%	108,028	28.52%	47,597	12.57%	19,132	5.05%	378,785
Kitsap	14,215	25.54%	26,114	46.92%	10,036	18.03%	5,293	9.51%	11,899	21.38%	55,658
Kittitas	1,421	18.69%	4,583	60.26%	1,136	14.94%	465	6.11%	3,162	41.58%	7,605
Klickitat	669	17.48%	2,205	57.60%	697	18.21%	257	6.71%	1,508	39.39%	3,828
Lewis	2,313	15.61%	9,611	64.87%	2,042	13.78%	849	5.73%	7,298	49.26%	14,815
Lincoln	440	14.95%	2,100	71.36%	272	9.24%	131	4.45%	1,660	56.41%	2,943
Mason	3,286	23.41%	6,969	49.65%	2,473	17.62%	1,309	9.33%	3,683	26.24%	14,037
Okanogan	1,452	18.62%	4,730	60.65%	1,195	15.32%	422	5.41%	3,278	42.03%	7,799
Pacific	1,328	23.63%	2,569	45.72%	1,260	22.42%	462	8.22%	1,241	22.09%	5,619
Pend Oreille	657	20.19%	1,949	59.90%	428	13.15%	220	6.76%	1,292	39.70%	3,254
Pierce	41,521	29.94%	63,196	45.57%	17,124	12.35%	16,826	12.13%	21,675	15.63%	138,667
San Juan	910	19.24%	1,910	40.38%	1,516	32.05%	394	8.33%	394	8.33%	4,730
Skagit	5,568	22.38%	12,909	51.90%	4,406	17.71%	1,992	8.01%	7,341	29.51%	24,875
Skamania	394	18.42%	1,120	52.36%	489	22.86%	136	6.36%	631	29.50%	2,139
Snohomish	32,160	24.81%	58,759	45.32%	24,789	19.12%	13,941	10.75%	26,599	20.52%	129,649
Spokane	19,137	20.69%	51,868	56.08%	14,336	15.50%	7,154	7.73%	32,731	35.39%	92,495
Stevens	1,586	15.69%	6,757	66.83%	1,184	11.71%	583	5.77%	5,171	51.15%	10,110
Thurston	11,877	22.61%	22,668	43.15%	12,773	24.31%	5,220	9.94%	9,895	18.83%	52,538
Wahkiakum	269	23.31%	587	50.87%	205	17.76%	93	8.06%	318	27.56%	1,154
Walla Walla	1,809	15.55%	7,397	63.56%	1,626	13.97%	805	6.92%	5,588	48.02%	11,637
Whatcom	8,150	20.23%	20,220	50.19%	8,427	20.92%	3,490	8.66%	11,793	29.27%	40,287
Whitman	1,164	17.45%	3,912	58.65%	969	14.53%	625	9.37%	2,748	41.20%	6,670
Yakima	5,979	20.48%	18,177	62.26%	3,251	11.14%	1,787	6.12%	12,198	41.78%	29,194
Totals	291,335	22.98%	584,444	46.09%	268,220	21.15%	123,936	9.77%	293,109	23.12%	1,267,935

Counties that flipped from Democratic to Republican

- Asotin (largest city: Clarkston)
- Chelan (largest city: Wenatchee)
- Clallam (largest city: Port Angeles)
- Douglas (largest city: East Wenatchee)
- Island (largest city: Oak Harbor)
- Kittitas (largest city: Ellensburg)
- Klickitat (largest city: Goldendale)
- Lewis (largest city: Centralia)
- Okanogan (largest city: Omak)
- Pend Oreille (largest city: Newport)
- Skagit (largest city: Mount Vernon)
- Skamania (largest city: Carson)
- Spokane (largest city: Spokane)
- Wahkiakum (largest city: Puget Island)
- Walla Walla (largest city: Walla Walla)
- Whatcom (largest city: Bellingham)
- Whitman (largest city: Pullman)
- Yakima (largest city: Yakima)

==== By congressional district ====
District	Kelley	Watkins	Pridemore	Miloscia	Representative
1st	23%	50%	18%	9%	Suzan DelBene
2nd	24%	44%	21%	10%	Rick Larsen
3rd	14%	51%	29%	6%	Jaime Herrera Beutler
4th	18%	66%	11%	6%	Doc Hastings
5th	20%	58%	15%	7%	Cathy McMorris Rodgers
6th	26%	45%	18%	10%	Norm Dicks
7th	26%	23%	40%	11%	Jim McDermott
8th	22%	54%	14%	11%	Dave Reichert
9th	26%	34%	23%	16%	Adam Smith
10th	28%	44%	17%	11%	Denny Heck

== General election ==
=== Post-primary endorsements ===
Troy Kelley (D)

Newspapers

- The Seattle Times

=== Polling ===
Poll source	Date(s) administered	Sample size	Margin of error	Troy Kelley (D)	James Watkins (R)	Undecided
Elway Research	October 18–21, 2012	451 (RV)	± 4.5%	34%	29%	37%
Elway Research	September 9–12, 2012	405 (RV)	± 5.0%	36%	27%	38%

=== Results ===
2012 Washington State Auditor election
Party	Candidate	Votes	%	±%
Democratic	Troy Kelley	1,512,620	52.95	–10.59
Republican	James Watkins	1,344,137	47.05	+10.59
Total votes		2,856,757	100.00	N/A
Democratic hold				

==== By county ====
County results
County	Troy Kelley Democratic		James Watkins Republican		Margin		Total votes
County	#	%	#	%	#	%	Total votes
Adams	1,348	30.47%	3,076	69.53%	-1,728	-39.06%	4,424
Asotin	3,771	41.07%	5,411	58.93%	-1,640	-17.86%	9,182
Benton	24,989	34.20%	48,083	65.80%	-23,094	-31.60%	73,072
Chelan	11,016	37.36%	18,471	62.64%	-7,455	-25.28%	29,487
Clallam	16,216	46.21%	18,875	53.79%	-2,659	-7.58%	35,091
Clark	82,405	46.85%	93,481	53.15%	-11,076	-6.30%	175,886
Columbia	577	28.33%	1,460	71.67%	-883	-43.35%	2,037
Cowlitz	20,787	50.36%	20,486	49.64%	301	0.73%	41,273
Douglas	4,586	33.19%	9,233	66.81%	-4,647	-33.63%	13,819
Ferry	1,221	38.66%	1,937	61.34%	-716	-22.67%	3,158
Franklin	7,737	36.13%	13,680	63.87%	-5,943	-27.75%	21,417
Garfield	336	29.12%	818	70.88%	-482	-41.77%	1,154
Grant	8,377	32.52%	17,380	67.48%	-9,003	-34.95%	25,757
Grays Harbor	14,381	54.01%	12,245	45.99%	2,136	8.02%	26,626
Island	18,708	48.37%	19,967	51.63%	-1,259	-3.26%	38,675
Jefferson	11,263	61.63%	7,013	38.37%	4,250	23.25%	18,276
King	558,930	64.58%	306,553	35.42%	252,377	29.16%	865,483
Kitsap	58,390	51.05%	55,989	48.95%	2,401	2.10%	114,379
Kittitas	6,765	41.36%	9,590	58.64%	-2,825	-17.27%	16,355
Klickitat	4,209	44.21%	5,312	55.79%	-1,103	-11.58%	9,521
Lewis	11,381	36.23%	20,033	63.77%	-8,652	-27.54%	31,414
Lincoln	1,606	29.40%	3,856	70.60%	-2,250	-41.19%	5,462
Mason	13,026	49.59%	13,239	50.41%	-213	-0.81%	26,265
Okanogan	6,451	41.32%	9,162	58.68%	-2,711	-17.36%	15,613
Pacific	5,142	52.49%	4,654	47.51%	488	4.98%	9,796
Pend Oreille	2,381	38.34%	3,829	61.66%	-1,448	-23.32%	6,210
Pierce	164,758	51.90%	152,714	48.10%	12,044	3.79%	317,472
San Juan	6,347	64.87%	3,437	35.13%	2,910	29.74%	9,784
Skagit	24,818	48.85%	25,987	51.15%	-1,169	-2.30%	50,805
Skamania	2,347	46.75%	2,673	53.25%	-326	-6.49%	5,020
Snohomish	160,487	52.81%	143,403	47.19%	17,084	5.62%	303,890
Spokane	90,855	44.06%	115,340	55.94%	-24,485	-11.87%	206,195
Stevens	7,156	34.43%	13,628	65.57%	-6,472	-31.14%	20,784
Thurston	63,094	54.58%	52,515	45.42%	10,579	9.15%	115,609
Wahkiakum	947	46.24%	1,101	53.76%	-154	-7.52%	2,048
Walla Walla	8,533	37.04%	14,504	62.96%	-5,971	-25.92%	23,037
Whatcom	50,325	53.22%	44,235	46.78%	6,090	6.44%	94,560
Whitman	6,806	44.05%	8,646	55.95%	-1,840	-11.91%	15,452
Yakima	30,148	41.72%	42,121	58.28%	-11,973	-16.57%	72,269
Totals	1,512,620	52.95%	1,344,137	47.05%	168,483	5.90%	2,856,757

Counties that flipped from Democratic to Republican

- Asotin (largest city: Clarkston)
- Chelan (largest city: Wenatchee)
- Clallam (largest city: Port Angeles)
- Clark (largest city: Vancouver)
- Island (largest city: Oak Harbor)
- Kittitas (largest city: Ellensburg)
- Klickitat (largest city: Goldendale)
- Lewis (largest city: Centralia)
- Mason (largest city: Shelton)
- Okanogan (largest city: Omak)
- Skagit (largest city: Mount Vernon)
- Skamania (largest city: Carson)
- Spokane (largest city: Spokane)
- Wahkiakum (largest city: Puget Island)
- Walla Walla (largest city: Walla Walla)
- Whitman (largest city: Pullman)
- Yakima (largest city: Yakima)

==== By congressional district ====
Kelley won five of ten congressional districts, with the remaining five going to Watkins, including one that elected a Democrat.

District	Kelley	Watkins	Representative
1st	49.7%	50.3%	Suzan DelBene
2nd	56%	44%	Rick Larsen
3rd	46%	54%	Jaime Herrera Beutler
4th	37%	63%	Doc Hastings
5th	42%	58%	Cathy McMorris Rodgers
6th	53%	47%	Norm Dicks
6th	53%	47%	Derek Kilmer
7th	75%	25%	Jim McDermott
8th	46%	54%	Dave Reichert
9th	64%	36%	Adam Smith
10th	54%	46%	Denny Heck
