= Brian Sonntag =

9th Auditor of Washington

9th Auditor of Washington
- In office January 13, 1993 – January 16, 2013
- Governor: Mike Lowry; Gary Locke; Christine Gregoire
- Preceded by: Robert V. Graham
- Succeeded by: Troy Kelley

Personal details
- Born: December 28, 1951 (age 74) Tacoma, Washington, U.S.
- Party: Democratic
- Spouse: Jann Sonntag
- Children: 5
- Education: University of Puget Sound
- Website: Official website

Brian S. Sonntag (born December 28, 1951) was the ninth Washington State Auditor. He served five terms, from 1993 until his retirement in 2013. He is a Democrat.

== Personal ==
Sonntag was born in 1951 in Tacoma, Washington. He attended Tacoma Community College and the University of Puget Sound. He and his wife Jann live in Tacoma. They have five sons and three grandchildren.

Sonntag has served on the boards of United Way and the Boys and Girls Clubs. He has volunteered for the YMCA and the March of Dimes and has also spent several years coaching youth baseball and basketball teams.

== Public office ==
Sonntag was first elected to public office in 1978 as Pierce County Clerk, working as the administrative officer for the Superior Courts. On November 4, 1986, he was elected to the office of Pierce County Auditor, an office his father, Jack W. Sonntag, had held from 1948 to 1969. Following the end of his second term, Sonntag was elected Washington State Auditor on November 3, 1992. He was re-elected four times, most recently in 2008 with 64 percent of the vote.

Sonntag is a Certified Government Financial Manager (CGFM), a designation formally recognized by seven states since its inception in 1994. He has been a member of the Washington Coalition for Open Government, State Productivity Board and the National State Auditors Association's Performance Audit Task Force. Although four of the fourteen members of his executive team at the State Auditor's Office are CPAs, the fact he is not a CPA has drawn criticism from some of his constituents.

== Tenure ==
One of the most publicized issues involving the Auditor's Office in 2006 was its performance audit of the Washington State Department of Transportation (WSDOT). Sonntag's office examined the WSDOT's inventory and project management, as well as its overall administration and overhead. Always a hot topic of debate, traffic congestion in Seattle caused many commuters to look more closely at what was being done to alleviate the problem. One sign that legislators were attempting to address the problem came in the form of SB 6839. The State Auditor was granted legal authority to conduct performance audits of transportation-related agencies on June 7, 2006, the effective date of Engrossed Substitute Senate Bill 6839. Section 5.2.c of the bill states, "Fair, independent, comprehensive performance audits of transportation-related agencies overseen by the elected state auditor are essential to improving the efficiency, economy, and effectiveness of the state's transportation system." Despite the bill's passage, Sonntag faced resistance from the transportation committee as he moved forward with the audit.

== 2012 gubernatorial campaign ==
On June 13, 2011, Sonntag announced he was considering a run for the 2012 Gubernatorial race. However, on July 5 Sonntag said he had decided not to run for Governor: “The Office of State Auditor continues to be a good fit and the place where I can best contribute and focus on my values.” On June 11, 2012, Sonntag endorsed Republican Attorney General Rob McKenna for Governor and became chairman of Democrats for Rob (D4R).

== Retirement and successor ==
In September 2011, Sonntag announced he would retire from the office of State Auditor: "In the past week, I made a difficult decision not to seek re-election as Washington State Auditor in 2012. It was a tough call, but it is the right decision. At the end of my current term, I will have served 20 years in this Office and 40 years in public service – 35 in elected office. Based on what we have accomplished and what we will continue to do on behalf of citizens, the 2012 election is the right time for the Office to transition to new leadership." He was succeeded by Troy Kelley.

== Recognition ==
On May 7, 1999, the Municipal League of King County awarded Sonntag the Warren G. Magnuson Award for "implementing performance measures and the performance audit as constructive management tools for state and local governments, allowing them to operate more efficiently and be more accountable to their constituencies."

== See also ==
- Association of Government Accountants
