= Washington State Auditor =

State Auditor of Washington
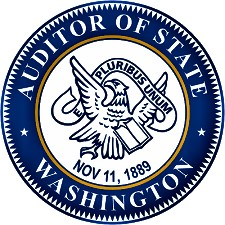
- Seal of the Auditor of the State of Washington

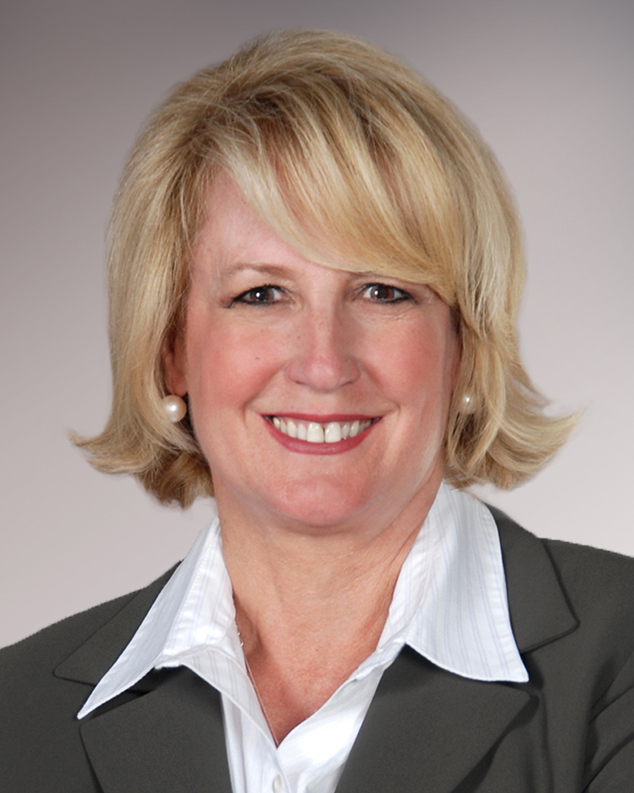
- Incumbent; Pat McCarthy since January 11, 2017
- Style: Mister or Madam Auditor (informal); The Honorable (formal)
- Seat: Washington State Capitol; Olympia, Washington
- Appointer: General election
- Term length: Four years, no term limits
- Constituting instrument: Washington Constitution of 1889: Article III, Sections 1, 3, 10, 20, 24, and 25; and Article V, Section 2
- Inaugural holder: Thomas Reed
- Formation: November 11, 1889 (136 years ago)
- Salary: $154,588
- Website: Official page

The state auditor of Washington is an independently elected constitutional officer in the executive branch of the government of the U.S. state of Washington. Eleven individuals have held the office since statehood. The incumbent is Pat McCarthy, a Democrat and the first woman to occupy the office.

== Powers and duties ==
Established in 1889, the office of State Auditor was designed by Washington's founders to assure that all public money received and disbursed by state and local governments is spent wisely and in the public interest. The state auditor exercises this constitutional power, duty, and authority as "auditor of public accounts" by conducting financial, single, accountability, cybersecurity, and performance audits of local governments and state agencies. In a similar vein, the state auditor investigates allegations of waste, fraud, or abuse of public funds. Altogether, 2,400 or so governmental entities and some $202 billion in public spending are subject to the state auditor's oversight.

Other programs have been assigned to the state auditor by law. For example, the state auditor prescribes uniform systems of accounting and financial reporting consistent with the pronouncements of the Governmental Accounting Standards Board for each of Washington's myriad counties, cities, towns, school districts, and other political subdivisions. Likewise, the state auditor supports local governments with advice and training on best practices in public administration, assesses compliance with Washington's open meeting and public records laws, and administers a whistleblower protection program for state employees. Functional responsibilities aside, the state auditor is also fourth (behind the lieutenant governor, secretary of state, and treasurer, respectively) in the line of succession to the office of governor of Washington.

== History ==
=== Territorial auditors ===
In 1854, one year after Washington left the Oregon Territory and became a territory in its own right, the Washington Territorial Legislature established the position of Territorial Auditor. The territorial auditor was tasked with "maintaining records of all receipts and disbursements, a 'pre-audit' settlement of all claims and the issuance of warrants". In 1864, the Legislative Assembly tasked Territorial Auditor Urban E. Hicks with "...the duty...to report such plans as he may deem expedient for the support of the public credit; for lessening the public expenses; for using the public money to the best advantage and for promoting frugality and economy in regard to the fiscal affairs of the territory."

==== Territorial auditors and their years of service ====
- Urban E. Hicks: 1858–1859,1865–1867
- A.J. Moses: 1859–1860
- J.C. Head: 1860–1862
- R.M. Walker: 1862–1864
- John Miller Murphy: 1867–1870, 1873–1874, 1888–Statehood (1889)

=== Early statehood ===
Thomas Reed (served from 1889 to 1893) was Washington's first state auditor. He established many values that still form a core part of the Washington State Auditor's Office mission, such as placing the public welfare before personal interests and the welfare of the state before partisanship. He added several key tasks to the auditor's duties, including investigating discrepancies in the accounting and reporting of budgets.

He was succeeded by Leban R. Grimes from 1893 to 1895, who continued Reed's agenda ensuring that the public good was placed before partisan interests. Grimes died suddenly in office, and Governon John H. McGraw appointed J.E. Frost to serve out Grimes' term from 1895 to 1897. Frost used many of the same financial models as his predecessor's and was optimistic about the overall solvency of the state despite the recession of the late 1890s.

Neal Cheetham replaced Frost in 1897, serving as auditor until 1901. Cheetham belonged to the Populist Party and believed that "a man has no more right to use powers delegated to him by the people, while he holds an official position, for selfish or personal ends than he would have to use public funds committed to his trust for similar purpose".

=== 20th century ===
Support for the Populist Party waned and Cheetham lost the next election to John D. Atkinson who served from 1901 to 1905. During his term, Atkinson, a Republican, addressed a wide range of issues, from banking to liquor license taxes and employee reimbursements. Perhaps his greatest successes were in state fund management; his recommendations regarding military taxes and lending from school funds saved taxpayers—and the state—money.

Republican Charles Clausen succeeded Atkison in 1905 and became Washington's first long-serving state auditor. During his 28-year term, he greatly expanded the duties of the Office, adding "the Bureau of Inspection and Supervision of Public Offices" to his responsibilities. This bureau's role was to "establish a system of uniform financial accounting and reporting by counties, cities, towns, townships and school districts".

Following Clausen, the first Washington-born state auditor, Cliff Yelle, served terms from 1933 to 1965. The Democrat was notable for refusing to pay 13 vouchers that lame-duck officials submitted for purported vacation pay. The officials protested Yelle's decision all the way to the state Supreme Court, but Yelle won the case and set the stage for cracking down on wasteful government spending. In 1941, the Legislature expanded the Office's authority to conduct annual audits of every state agency. Yelle also developed the investigative role of the auditor's office, probing the Highway Department's use of public funds to purchase luxury vehicles and accumulate other unnecessary costs. While government officials criticized Yelle for these investigations, the public retained him as auditor for 32 years, during which time the number local governments and state agencies audited by the Office more than doubled to 1,950.

Robert V. Graham took office from Yelle in 1965 and served seven terms until his retirement in 1993. Graham, a Democrat, would describe the role of the state auditor as a "window into state and local government for Washington citizens." To that end, Graham endeavored to bring audits of government performance into his Office's responsibilities, but legislative action in 1971 prevented him from doing so. Among his successes were the establishment of a fraud unit designed to detect and prevent fraud, the development of a uniform Budgeting Accounting and Reporting System (BARS) that applied to all local government, and the consolidation of the statewide, federal Single Audit Acts (also known as the SWSA). In 1982, the Legislature authorized the Whistleblower Program, allowing public employees to report waste of public resources to the Office. Graham died in April 2014.

Brian Sonntag became Washington's ninth auditor with his election as a Democrat in 1993. Sonntag prioritized raising the public profile of the Office, and championed government compliance with open meeting and public records laws. Under his tenure, the office saw significant expansion of its powers to conduct performance audits. Initiative 900, approved by 57% of voters, authorized the state auditor to conduct independent performance audits of state and local governments. Sonntag did not seek re-election in 2012 and was succeeded by Troy Kelley.

=== 21st century ===
Troy Kelley, the 10th state auditor, was inaugurated in January 2013 and completed his term in office in January 2017. For nine months during his term, he took a leave of absence and was replaced by Acting State Auditor Jan Jutte after his indictment by the United States Department of Justice for mortgage fraud in 2015. The mission of the office is to hold state and local governments accountable for the use of public funds.

Pat McCarthy was elected Washington state auditor on November 8, 2016. She assumed office on January 11, 2017. McCarthy began her career in public service as an elected school board director for the Tacoma School District, a position she held from 1987–1999. She then became the deputy auditor for Pierce County in 1999. She was then elected and served as county auditor in 2002 and 2006. She served from 2003–2008. In 2008, McCarthy was then elected to serve two terms as Pierce County executive, from 2009 to 2017. As county executive, McCarthy was tasked with running the daily operations of the county, including overseeing a $900 million budget and managing 3,000 employees. She was re-elected in 2020 and 2024.
