= 2020 Washington Insurance Commissioner election =

- November 3, 2020
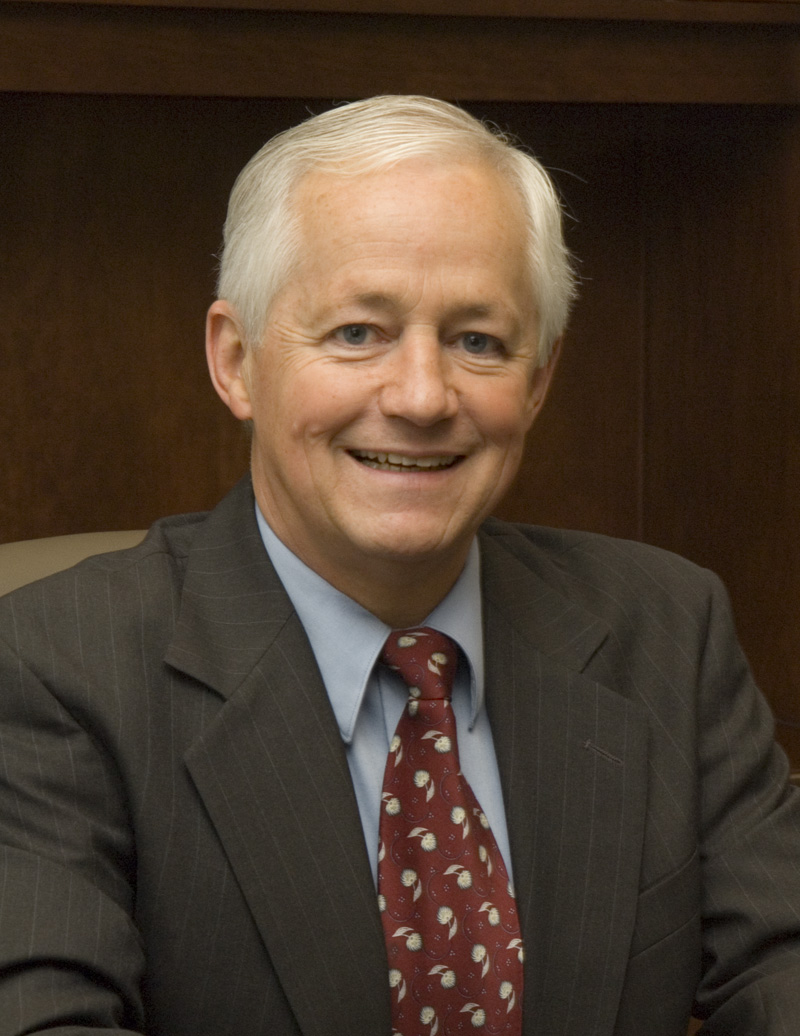

Candidate	Mike Kreidler	Chirayu Avinash Patel
Party	Democratic	Republican
Popular vote	2,506,693	1,308,292
Percentage	65.39%	34.13%
- Kreidler: 50–60% 60–70% 70–80% 80–90% Patel: 50–60% 60–70%
Insurance Commissioner before election
Mike Kreidler
Democratic
Elected Insurance Commissioner
Mike Kreidler
Democratic

The 2020 Washington Insurance Commissioner election was held on November 3, 2020, to elect the insurance commissioner of Washington, concurrently with the 2020 U.S. presidential election, as well as elections to the U.S. Senate and various state and local elections, including for U.S. House and governor of Washington. Incumbent Democratic Insurance Commissioner Mike Kreidler was re-elected to a sixth term by a significant margin.

== Background ==
Incumbent Insurance Commissioner Mike Kreidler, first elected in 2000 and re-elected four times, most recently in 2016, ran for re-election to a sixth term in office.

== Primary election ==
Washington is one of two states that holds a top-two primary, meaning all candidates are listed on the same ballot regardless of party affiliation, and the top two advance to the general election.

=== Democratic candidates ===
==== Advanced to general ====
- Mike Kreidler, incumbent insurance commissioner (2001–2025)

=== Republican candidates ===
==== Advanced to general ====
- Chirayu Avinash Patel, insurance agent

=== Libertarian candidates ===
==== Eliminated in primary ====
- Anthony Welti, insurance agent

=== Results ===
County results Kreidler: 40–50%; 50–60%; 60–70%; 70–80%; Patel: 40–50%; 50–60%; 60–70%

Congressional district results Kreidler: 40–50%; 50–60%; 60–70%; 70–80%; 80–90%; Patel: 40–50%

Blanket primary election results
Party	Candidate	Votes	%
Democratic	Mike Kreidler (incumbent)	1,402,650	59.03
Republican	Chirayu Avinash Patel	644,446	27.12
Libertarian	Anthony Welti	324,921	13.67
Write-in		4,220	0.18
Total votes		2,376,237	100.00

==== By county ====
County results
County	Mike Kreidler Democratic		Chirayu Avinash Patel Republican		Anthony Welti Libertarian		Write-in Various		Margin		Total votes
County	#	%	#	%	#	%	#	%	#	%	Total votes
Adams	854	26.29%	1,990	61.25%	396	12.19%	9	0.28%	-1,136	-34.96%	3,249
Asotin	2,439	37.38%	3,414	52.32%	652	9.99%	20	0.31%	-975	-14.94%	6,525
Benton	21,785	36.80%	28,105	47.48%	9,130	15.42%	174	0.29%	-6,320	-10.68%	59,194
Chelan	11,361	42.89%	11,711	44.21%	3,348	12.64%	71	0.27%	-350	-1.32%	26,491
Clallam	16,613	53.27%	10,591	33.96%	3,939	12.63%	41	0.13%	6,022	19.31%	31,184
Clark	74,986	51.75%	44,693	30.84%	24,878	17.17%	355	0.24%	30,293	20.90%	144,912
Columbia	454	28.95%	911	58.10%	194	12.37%	9	0.57%	-457	-29.15%	1,568
Cowlitz	14,235	40.55%	16,012	45.61%	4,784	13.63%	74	0.21%	-1,777	-5.06%	35,105
Douglas	4,445	34.87%	6,641	52.10%	1,627	12.76%	34	0.27%	-2,196	-17.23%	12,747
Ferry	1,064	35.08%	1,506	49.65%	456	15.03%	7	0.23%	-442	-14.57%	3,033
Franklin	6,429	36.08%	8,630	48.43%	2,731	15.32%	31	0.17%	-2,201	-12.35%	17,821
Garfield	266	28.09%	596	62.94%	81	8.55%	4	0.42%	-330	-34.85%	947
Grant	6,040	28.46%	11,915	56.15%	3,226	15.20%	40	0.29%	-5,875	-27.68%	21,221
Grays Harbor	11,418	49.11%	8,824	37.95%	2,963	12.74%	45	0.19%	2,594	11.16%	23,250
Island	19,454	56.05%	10,982	31.64%	4,210	12.13%	63	0.18%	8,472	24.41%	34,709
Jefferson	11,847	71.14%	3,382	20.31%	1,376	8.26%	49	0.29%	8,465	50.83%	16,654
King	547,079	76.22%	96,338	13.42%	73,431	10.23%	915	0.13%	450,741	62.80%	717,763
Kitsap	55,762	59.40%	22,668	24.15%	15,321	16.32%	118	0.13%	33,094	35.26%	93,869
Kittitas	6,504	43.15%	6,628	43.97%	1,925	12.77%	17	0.11%	-124	-0.82%	15,074
Klickitat	3,354	42.64%	3,582	45.54%	922	11.72%	7	0.09%	-228	-2.90%	7,865
Lewis	9,563	33.10%	15,025	52.00%	4,253	14.72%	51	0.18%	-5,462	-18.90%	28,892
Lincoln	1,147	25.56%	2,628	58.56%	701	15.62%	12	0.27%	-1,481	-33.00%	4,488
Mason	11,354	49.22%	8,662	37.55%	2,987	12.95%	64	0.28%	2,692	11.67%	23,067
Okanogan	5,454	41.54%	6,106	46.50%	1,530	11.65%	40	0.30%	-652	-4.97%	13,130
Pacific	4,594	51.68%	3,260	36.67%	1,007	11.33%	29	0.33%	1,334	15.01%	8,890
Pend Oreille	1,678	32.53%	2,720	52.73%	745	14.44%	15	0.29%	-1,042	-20.20%	5,158
Pierce	146,296	55.94%	72,560	27.75%	42,184	16.13%	476	0.18%	73,736	28.20%	261,516
San Juan	6,522	74.84%	1,141	13.09%	1,045	11.99%	7	0.08%	5,381	61.74%	8,715
Skagit	23,503	52.90%	15,335	34.52%	5,493	12.36%	94	0.21%	8,168	18.39%	44,425
Skamania	1,738	42.92%	1,602	39.57%	697	17.21%	12	0.30%	136	3.36%	4,049
Snohomish	145,657	58.22%	63,161	25.25%	40,976	16.38%	392	0.16%	82,496	32.97%	250,186
Spokane	73,698	46.13%	65,760	41.16%	19,896	12.45%	403	0.25%	7,938	4.97%	159,757
Stevens	4,945	28.20%	9,916	56.55%	2,604	14.85%	70	0.40%	-4,971	-28.35%	17,535
Thurston	64,459	62.63%	24,508	23.81%	13,743	13.35%	212	0.21%	39,951	38.82%	102,922
Wahkiakum	800	41.71%	861	44.89%	254	13.24%	3	0.16%	-61	-3.18%	1,918
Walla Walla	8,203	43.45%	8,536	45.21%	2,116	11.21%	26	0.14%	-333	-1.76%	18,881
Whatcom	51,766	58.31%	15,416	17.37%	21,496	24.21%	94	0.11%	30,270	34.10%	88,772
Whitman	5,222	49.01%	4,101	38.49%	1,304	12.24%	29	0.27%	1,121	10.52%	10,656
Yakima	19,662	39.25%	24,029	47.96%	6,300	12.58%	108	0.22%	-4,367	-8.72%	50,099
Totals	1,402,650	59.03%	644,446	27.12%	324,921	13.67%	4,220	0.18%	758,204	31.91%	2,376,237

==== By congressional district ====
District	Kreidler	Patel	Welti	Representative
1st	58%	23%	18%	Suzan DelBene
2nd	62%	24%	15%	Rick Larsen
3rd	47%	37%	16%	Jaime Herrera Beutler
4th	36%	49%	14%	Dan Newhouse
5th	43%	44%	13%	Cathy McMorris Rodgers
6th	60%	26%	14%	Derek Kilmer
7th	86%	7%	7%	Pramila Jayapal
8th	52%	31%	16%	Kim Schrier
9th	74%	15%	11%	Adam Smith
10th	59%	26%	15%	Denny Heck

== General election ==
=== Endorsements ===
Mike Kreidler (D)

Labor unions

- Washington State Labor Council
- Pierce County Central Labor Council, AFL-CIO
- Washington State Council of Fire Fighters
- SEIU 775

Organizations

- Reproductive Freedom for All
- Planned Parenthood Votes Northwest and Hawaii

Newspapers

- The Seattle Times
- The Columbian
- The News Tribune
- Union-Bulletin
- The Stranger
- Northwest Asian Weekly
- The Yakima Herald
- Tri-City Herald
- The Olympian

=== Polling ===
Poll source	Date(s) administered	Sample size (Note: Key: A – all adults RV – registered voters LV – likely voters V – unclear)	Margin of error	Mike Kreidler (D)	Chirayu Avinash Patel (R)	Undecided
Public Policy Polling (D) (Note: Poll sponsored by the Northwest Progressive Institute)	October 14–15, 2020	610 (LV)	± 4%	52%	30%	18%

2020 Washington Insurance Commissioner election debate
No.	Date	Host	Moderator	Link	Democratic	Republican
Key: P Participant A Absent N Not invited I Invited W Withdrawn						
Key: P Participant A Absent N Not invited I Invited W Withdrawn					Mike Kreidler	Chirayu Avinash Patel
1	Oct. 14, 2020	The Columbian		YouTube	P	N

=== Results ===
2020 Washington Insurance Commissioner election
Party	Candidate	Votes	%	±%
Democratic	Mike Kreidler (incumbent)	2,506,693	65.39	+7.05
Republican	Chirayu Avinash Patel	1,308,292	34.13	–7.53
Write-in		18,576	0.48	N/A
Total votes		3,833,561	100.00	N/A
Democratic hold				

==== By county ====
County results
County	Mike Kreidler Democratic		Chirayu Avinash Patel Republican		Write-in Various		Margin		Total votes
County	#	%	#	%	#	%	#	%	Total votes
Adams	2,187	39.75%	3,293	59.85%	22	0.40%	-1,106	-20.10%	5,502
Asotin	5,191	46.97%	5,802	52.50%	59	0.53%	-611	-5.53%	11,052
Benton	46,327	48.09%	49,374	51.26%	627	0.65%	-3,047	-3.16%	96,328
Chelan	21,376	53.29%	18,552	46.25%	184	0.46%	2,824	7.04%	40,112
Clallam	27,415	59.54%	18,051	39.21%	576	1.25%	9,364	20.34%	46,042
Clark	149,006	58.90%	102,649	40.58%	1,320	0.52%	46,357	18.32%	252,975
Columbia	862	37.91%	1,400	61.57%	12	0.53%	-538	-23.66%	2,274
Cowlitz	27,851	49.35%	28,334	50.21%	250	0.44%	-483	-0.86%	56,435
Douglas	9,259	46.51%	10,502	52.75%	148	0.74%	-1,243	-6.24%	19,909
Ferry	1,823	45.01%	2,200	54.32%	27	0.67%	-377	-9.31%	4,050
Franklin	15,602	50.73%	14,968	48.67%	183	0.60%	634	2.06%	30,753
Garfield	532	39.97%	789	59.28%	10	0.75%	-257	-19.31%	1,331
Grant	14,594	41.54%	20,354	57.94%	182	0.52%	-5,760	-16.40%	35,130
Grays Harbor	20,473	56.64%	15,536	42.98%	140	0.39%	4,937	13.66%	36,149
Island	31,167	61.95%	18,846	37.46%	294	0.58%	12,321	24.49%	50,307
Jefferson	17,629	74.46%	5,974	25.23%	73	0.31%	11,655	49.23%	23,676
King	904,005	79.40%	230,714	20.26%	3,801	0.33%	673,291	59.14%	1,138,520
Kitsap	96,674	65.03%	51,120	34.39%	873	0.59%	45,554	30.64%	148,667
Kittitas	12,940	53.24%	11,231	46.20%	136	0.56%	1,709	7.03%	24,307
Klickitat	6,454	51.59%	5,992	47.89%	65	0.52%	462	3.69%	12,511
Lewis	18,281	43.05%	23,950	56.40%	237	0.56%	-5,669	-13.35%	42,468
Lincoln	2,221	34.04%	4,262	65.33%	41	0.63%	-2,041	-31.28%	6,524
Mason	19,862	56.63%	15,042	42.88%	172	0.49%	4,820	13.74%	35,076
Okanogan	10,144	51.44%	9,469	48.02%	107	0.54%	675	3.42%	19,720
Pacific	7,555	57.23%	5,581	42.28%	65	0.49%	1,974	14.95%	13,201
Pend Oreille	3,286	40.91%	4,686	58.34%	60	0.75%	-1,400	-17.43%	8,032
Pierce	272,277	62.27%	162,697	37.21%	2,287	0.52%	109,580	25.06%	437,261
San Juan	9,620	77.97%	2,683	21.75%	35	0.28%	6,937	56.22%	12,338
Skagit	41,116	60.98%	25,961	38.50%	348	0.52%	15,155	22.48%	67,425
Skamania	3,494	51.25%	3,284	48.17%	39	0.57%	210	3.08%	6,817
Snohomish	273,000	65.85%	139,411	33.63%	2,149	0.52%	133,589	32.22%	414,560
Spokane	150,062	54.37%	124,029	44.94%	1,903	0.69%	26,033	9.43%	275,994
Stevens	10,390	39.04%	16,039	60.27%	184	0.69%	-5,649	-21.23%	26,613
Thurston	107,718	67.36%	51,429	32.16%	768	0.48%	56,289	35.20%	159,915
Wahkiakum	1,325	48.16%	1,418	51.54%	8	0.29%	-93	-3.38%	2,751
Walla Walla	15,464	52.50%	13,897	47.18%	95	0.32%	1,567	5.32%	29,456
Whatcom	88,999	69.10%	39,188	30.43%	614	0.48%	49,811	38.67%	128,801
Whitman	11,960	60.72%	7,630	38.74%	106	0.54%	4,330	21.98%	19,696
Yakima	48,552	53.42%	41,955	46.16%	376	0.41%	6,597	7.26%	90,883
Totals	2,506,693	65.39%	1,308,292	34.13%	18,576	0.48%	1,198,401	31.26%	3,833,561

Counties that flipped from Republican to Democratic

- Chelan (largest city: Wenatchee)
- Franklin (largest city: Pasco)
- Kittitas (largest city: Ellensburg)
- Klickitat (largest city: Goldendale)
- Okanogan (largest city: Omak)
- Skamania (largest city: Carson)
- Spokane (largest city: Spokane)
- Walla Walla (largest city: Walla Walla)
- Yakima (largest city: Yakima)

==== By congressional district ====
Kreidler won nine of ten congressional districts, including two that elected Republicans.

District	Kreidler	Patel	Representative
1st	66%	33%	Suzan DelBene
2nd	69%	31%	Rick Larsen
3rd	55%	44%	Jaime Herrera Beutler
4th	49%	50%	Dan Newhouse
5th	53%	47%	Cathy McMorris Rodgers
6th	65%	34%	Derek Kilmer
7th	88%	12%	Pramila Jayapal
8th	60%	39%	Kim Schrier
9th	78%	22%	Adam Smith
10th	65%	35%	Denny Heck (116th Congress)
10th	65%	35%	Marilyn Strickland (117th Congress)

== Notes ==
Partisan clients
