= 2016 Washington Insurance Commissioner election =

- November 8, 2016
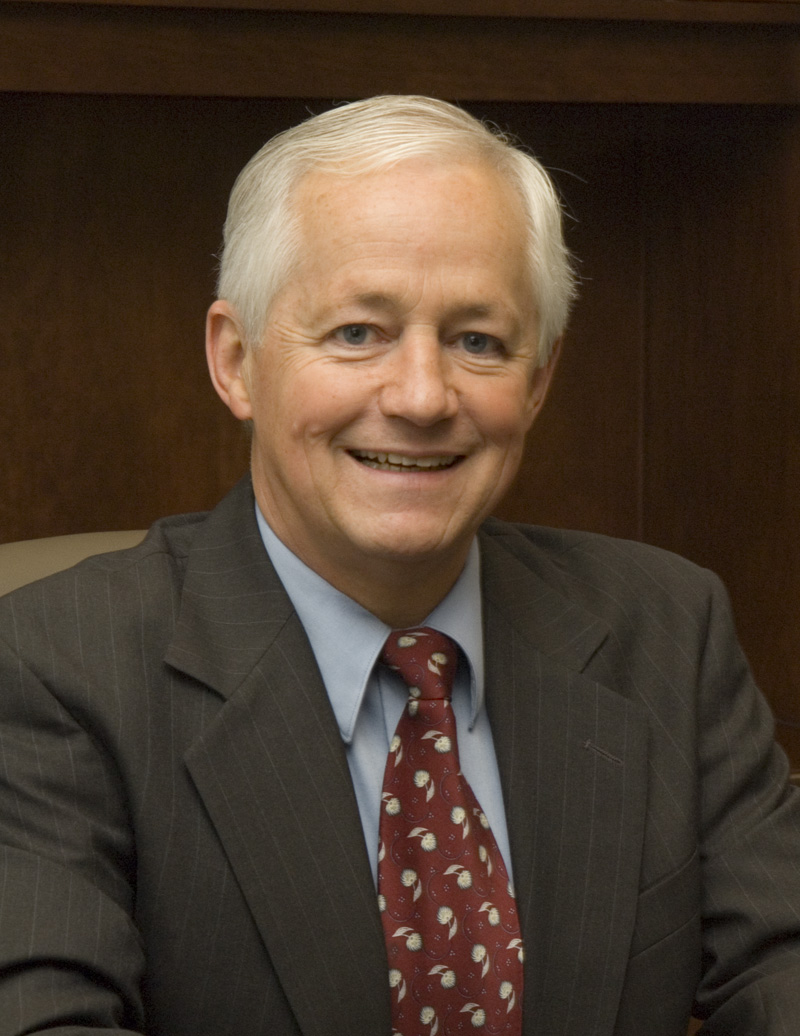

| Candidate | Mike Kreidler | Richard Schrock |
| Party | Democratic | Republican |
| Popular vote | 1,763,134 | 1,258,827 |
| Percentage | 58.34% | 41.66% |
- Kreidler: 50–60% 60–70% 70–80% 80–90% Schrock: 50–60% 60–70% 70–80%
Insurance Commissioner before election
Mike Kreidler
Democratic
Elected Insurance Commissioner
Mike Kreidler
Democratic

The 2016 Washington Insurance Commissioner election was held on November 8, 2016, to elect the insurance commissioner of Washington, concurrently with the 2016 U.S. presidential election, as well as elections to the U.S. Senate and various state and local elections, including for U.S. House and governor of Washington. Incumbent Democratic Insurance Commissioner Mike Kreidler was re-elected to a fifth term in a landslide.

== Background ==
Incumbent Insurance Commissioner Mike Kreidler, first elected in 2000 and re-elected three times, most recently in 2012, ran for re-election to a fifth term in office.

== Primary election ==
Washington is one of two states that holds a top-two primary, meaning all candidates are listed on the same ballot regardless of party affiliation, and the top two advance to the general election.

=== Democratic candidates ===
==== Advanced to general ====
- Mike Kreidler, incumbent insurance commissioner (2001–2025)

=== Republican candidates ===
==== Advanced to general ====
- Richard Schrock, Snohomish County Fire District 1 commissioner

=== Libertarian candidates ===
==== Eliminated in primary ====
- Justin Murta

=== Endorsements ===
Mike Kreidler (D)

Newspapers

- The Seattle Times

=== Results ===
County results Kreidler: 40–50%; 50–60%; 60–70%; 70–80%; Shrock: 40–50%; 50–60%; 60–70%

Congressional district results Kreidler: 40–50%; 50–60%; 70–80%; 80–90%; Shrock: 40–50%; 50–60%

Blanket primary election results
| Party | Candidate | Votes | % |
|---|---|---|---|
| Democratic | Mike Kreidler (incumbent) | 772,569 | 58.41 |
| Republican | Richard Schrock | 450,830 | 34.09 |
| Libertarian | Justin Murta | 99,181 | 7.50 |
| Total votes | | 1,322,580 | 100.00 |

==== By county ====
| County | Mike Kreidler Democratic | | Richard Schrock Republican | | Justin Murta Libertarian | | Margin | | Total votes cast |
| County | # | % | # | % | # | % | # | % | Total votes cast |
|---|---|---|---|---|---|---|---|---|---|
| Adams | 484 | 26.39% | 1,250 | 68.16% | 100 | 5.45% | -766 | -41.77% | 1,834 |
| Asotin | 1,698 | 40.77% | 2,196 | 52.73% | 271 | 6.51% | -498 | -11.96% | 4,165 |
| Benton | 11,205 | 36.64% | 16,607 | 54.30% | 2,771 | 9.06% | -5,402 | -17.66% | 30,583 |
| Chelan | 5,628 | 40.40% | 7,394 | 53.07% | 910 | 6.53% | -1,766 | -12.68% | 13,932 |
| Clallam | 9,454 | 51.97% | 7,502 | 41.24% | 1,234 | 6.78% | 1,952 | 10.73% | 18,190 |
| Clark | 34,843 | 49.03% | 30,602 | 43.07% | 5,613 | 7.90% | 4,241 | 5.97% | 71,058 |
| Columbia | 287 | 30.02% | 591 | 61.82% | 78 | 8.16% | -304 | -31.80% | 956 |
| Cowlitz | 7,943 | 46.00% | 7,752 | 44.90% | 1,571 | 9.10% | 191 | 1.11% | 17,266 |
| Douglas | 2,305 | 34.61% | 3,930 | 59.01% | 425 | 6.38% | -1,625 | -24.40% | 6,660 |
| Ferry | 649 | 37.56% | 886 | 51.27% | 193 | 11.17% | -237 | -13.72% | 1,728 |
| Franklin | 2,796 | 34.05% | 4,814 | 58.63% | 601 | 7.32% | -2,018 | -24.58% | 8,211 |
| Garfield | 160 | 28.62% | 364 | 65.12% | 35 | 6.26% | -204 | -36.49% | 559 |
| Grant | 3,185 | 29.78% | 6,581 | 61.53% | 930 | 8.69% | -3,396 | -31.75% | 10,696 |
| Grays Harbor | 6,778 | 53.29% | 4,889 | 38.44% | 1,051 | 8.26% | 1,889 | 14.85% | 12,718 |
| Island | 11,295 | 53.70% | 8,303 | 39.48% | 1,435 | 6.82% | 2,992 | 14.23% | 21,033 |
| Jefferson | 7,037 | 68.11% | 2,644 | 25.59% | 651 | 6.30% | 4,393 | 42.52% | 10,332 |
| King | 309,905 | 73.96% | 84,764 | 20.23% | 24,341 | 5.81% | 225,141 | 53.73% | 419,010 |
| Kitsap | 30,477 | 58.17% | 17,114 | 32.67% | 4,801 | 9.16% | 13,363 | 25.51% | 52,392 |
| Kittitas | 3,336 | 43.06% | 3,877 | 50.04% | 535 | 6.91% | -541 | -6.98% | 7,748 |
| Klickitat | 1,708 | 39.97% | 2,180 | 51.02% | 385 | 9.01% | -472 | -11.05% | 4,273 |
| Lewis | 5,111 | 35.63% | 8,241 | 57.45% | 992 | 6.92% | -3,130 | -21.82% | 14,344 |
| Lincoln | 722 | 27.63% | 1,701 | 65.10% | 190 | 7.27% | -979 | -37.47% | 2,613 |
| Mason | 7,070 | 51.97% | 5,498 | 40.41% | 1,037 | 7.62% | 1,572 | 11.55% | 13,605 |
| Okanogan | 3,296 | 40.78% | 4,206 | 52.04% | 580 | 7.18% | -910 | -11.26% | 8,082 |
| Pacific | 2,698 | 51.93% | 2,124 | 40.89% | 373 | 7.18% | 574 | 11.05% | 5,195 |
| Pend Oreille | 1,203 | 37.44% | 1,646 | 51.23% | 364 | 11.33% | -443 | -13.79% | 3,213 |
| Pierce | 77,715 | 55.96% | 48,943 | 35.24% | 12,218 | 8.80% | 28,772 | 20.72% | 138,876 |
| San Juan | 3,642 | 67.59% | 1,349 | 25.04% | 397 | 7.37% | 2,293 | 42.56% | 5,388 |
| Skagit | 12,779 | 53.44% | 9,674 | 40.45% | 1,460 | 6.11% | 3,105 | 12.98% | 23,913 |
| Skamania | 906 | 42.84% | 995 | 47.04% | 214 | 10.12% | -89 | -4.21% | 2,115 |
| Snohomish | 78,451 | 57.34% | 45,985 | 33.61% | 12,379 | 9.05% | 32,466 | 23.73% | 136,815 |
| Spokane | 42,832 | 45.88% | 42,622 | 45.66% | 7,901 | 8.46% | 210 | 0.22% | 93,355 |
| Stevens | 3,121 | 30.30% | 6,011 | 58.35% | 1,169 | 11.35% | -2,890 | -28.06% | 10,301 |
| Thurston | 37,073 | 62.83% | 16,729 | 28.35% | 5,202 | 8.82% | 20,344 | 34.48% | 59,004 |
| Wahkiakum | 463 | 44.73% | 503 | 48.60% | 69 | 6.67% | -40 | -3.86% | 1,035 |
| Walla Walla | 4,362 | 40.34% | 5,645 | 52.21% | 806 | 7.45% | -1,283 | -11.87% | 10,813 |
| Whatcom | 26,029 | 56.58% | 16,624 | 36.13% | 3,353 | 7.29% | 9,405 | 20.44% | 46,006 |
| Whitman | 2,946 | 45.15% | 3,009 | 46.11% | 570 | 8.74% | -63 | -0.97% | 6,525 |
| Yakima | 10,977 | 39.15% | 15,085 | 53.80% | 1,976 | 7.05% | -4,108 | -14.65% | 28,038 |
| Totals | 772,569 | 58.41% | 450,830 | 34.09% | 99,181 | 7.50% | 321,739 | 24.33% | 1,322,580 |

Counties that flipped from Democratic to Republican

- Wahkiakum (largest city: Puget Island)

Counties that flipped from Republican to Democratic

- Clark (largest city: Vancouver)
- Spokane (largest city: Spokane)

==== By congressional district ====
| District | Kreidler | Schrock | Murta | Representative |
|---|---|---|---|---|
| 1st | 56% | 36% | 8% | Suzan DelBene |
| 2nd | 60% | 32% | 8% | Rick Larsen |
| 3rd | 47% | 45% | 8% | Jaime Herrera Beutler |
| 4th | 36% | 56% | 8% | Dan Newhouse |
| 5th | 43% | 48% | 9% | Cathy McMorris Rodgers |
| 6th | 59% | 33% | 8% | Derek Kilmer |
| 7th | 84% | 12% | 4% | Jim McDermott |
| 8th | 50% | 41% | 8% | Dave Reichert |
| 9th | 72% | 22% | 6% | Adam Smith |
| 10th | 59% | 32% | 9% | Denny Heck |

== General election ==
=== Polling ===
| Poll source | Date(s) administered | Sample size | Margin of error | Mike Kreidler (D) | Richard Schrock (R) | Undecided |
|---|---|---|---|---|---|---|
| Elway Poll | October 20–22, 2016 | 502 (RV) | ± 4.5% | 44% | 28% | 28% |

=== Results ===
2016 Washington Insurance Commissioner election
| Party | Candidate | Votes | % | ±% |
|---|---|---|---|---|
| Democratic | Mike Kreidler (incumbent) | 1,763,134 | 58.34 | +0.04 |
| Republican | Richard Schrock | 1,258,827 | 41.66 | –0.04 |
| Total votes | | 3,021,961 | 100.00 | N/A |
| Democratic hold | | | | |

==== By county ====
County results
| County | Mike Kreidler Democratic | | Richard Schrock Republican | | Margin | | Total votes |
| County | # | % | # | % | # | % | Total votes |
|---|---|---|---|---|---|---|---|
| Adams | 1,512 | 34.27% | 2,900 | 65.73% | -1,388 | -31.46% | 4,412 |
| Asotin | 3,627 | 39.64% | 5,522 | 60.36% | -1,895 | -20.71% | 9,149 |
| Benton | 30,142 | 39.43% | 46,296 | 60.57% | -16,154 | -21.13% | 76,438 |
| Chelan | 13,562 | 43.51% | 17,608 | 56.49% | -4,046 | -12.98% | 31,170 |
| Clallam | 19,364 | 52.21% | 17,726 | 47.79% | 1,638 | 4.42% | 37,090 |
| Clark | 94,558 | 50.16% | 93,973 | 49.84% | 585 | 0.31% | 188,531 |
| Columbia | 622 | 31.10% | 1,378 | 68.90% | -756 | -37.80% | 2,000 |
| Cowlitz | 20,282 | 47.59% | 22,332 | 52.41% | -2,050 | -4.81% | 42,614 |
| Douglas | 5,592 | 38.22% | 9,040 | 61.78% | -3,448 | -23.56% | 14,632 |
| Ferry | 1,297 | 38.69% | 2,055 | 61.31% | -758 | -22.61% | 3,352 |
| Franklin | 9,491 | 41.67% | 13,288 | 58.33% | -3,797 | -16.67% | 22,779 |
| Garfield | 365 | 31.71% | 786 | 68.29% | -421 | -36.58% | 1,151 |
| Grant | 9,021 | 33.69% | 17,755 | 66.31% | -8,734 | -32.62% | 26,776 |
| Grays Harbor | 14,621 | 54.13% | 12,392 | 45.87% | 2,229 | 8.25% | 27,013 |
| Island | 22,136 | 54.35% | 18,595 | 45.65% | 3,541 | 8.69% | 40,731 |
| Jefferson | 13,204 | 68.33% | 6,119 | 31.67% | 7,085 | 36.67% | 19,323 |
| King | 672,924 | 73.01% | 248,804 | 26.99% | 424,120 | 46.01% | 921,728 |
| Kitsap | 67,397 | 56.61% | 51,657 | 43.39% | 15,740 | 13.22% | 119,054 |
| Kittitas | 7,901 | 44.92% | 9,688 | 55.08% | -1,787 | -10.16% | 17,589 |
| Klickitat | 4,431 | 44.19% | 5,597 | 55.81% | -1,166 | -11.63% | 10,028 |
| Lewis | 12,134 | 37.62% | 20,123 | 62.38% | -7,989 | -24.77% | 32,257 |
| Lincoln | 1,601 | 29.48% | 3,830 | 70.52% | -2,229 | -41.04% | 5,431 |
| Mason | 13,984 | 52.43% | 12,688 | 47.57% | 1,296 | 4.86% | 26,672 |
| Okanogan | 7,020 | 43.59% | 9,084 | 56.41% | -2,064 | -12.82% | 16,104 |
| Pacific | 5,261 | 52.75% | 4,713 | 47.25% | 548 | 5.49% | 9,974 |
| Pend Oreille | 2,380 | 36.95% | 4,062 | 63.05% | -1,682 | -26.11% | 6,442 |
| Pierce | 184,148 | 55.71% | 146,390 | 44.29% | 37,758 | 11.42% | 330,538 |
| San Juan | 7,085 | 70.02% | 3,033 | 29.98% | 4,052 | 40.05% | 10,118 |
| Skagit | 28,230 | 53.31% | 24,727 | 46.69% | 3,503 | 6.61% | 52,957 |
| Skamania | 2,379 | 45.57% | 2,842 | 54.43% | -463 | -8.87% | 5,221 |
| Snohomish | 187,135 | 57.24% | 139,785 | 42.76% | 47,350 | 14.48% | 326,920 |
| Spokane | 100,839 | 46.46% | 116,194 | 53.54% | -15,355 | -7.07% | 217,033 |
| Stevens | 6,770 | 31.37% | 14,808 | 68.63% | -8,038 | -37.25% | 21,578 |
| Thurston | 77,425 | 62.15% | 47,146 | 37.85% | 30,279 | 24.31% | 124,571 |
| Wahkiakum | 932 | 43.90% | 1,191 | 56.10% | -259 | -12.20% | 2,123 |
| Walla Walla | 10,313 | 43.19% | 13,564 | 56.81% | -3,251 | -13.62% | 23,877 |
| Whatcom | 61,275 | 58.89% | 42,783 | 41.11% | 18,492 | 17.77% | 104,058 |
| Whitman | 8,314 | 51.15% | 7,941 | 48.85% | 373 | 2.29% | 16,255 |
| Yakima | 33,860 | 45.59% | 40,412 | 54.41% | -6,552 | -8.82% | 74,272 |
| Totals | 1,763,134 | 58.34% | 1,258,827 | 41.66% | 504,307 | 16.69% | 3,021,961 |

Counties that flipped from Democratic to Republican

- Cowlitz (largest city: Longview)
- Wahkiakum (largest city: Puget Island)

Counties that flipped from Republican to Democratic

- Whitman (largest city: Pullman)

==== By congressional district ====
Kreidler won seven of ten congressional districts, including one that elected a Republican.

| District | Kreidler | Schrock | Representative |
|---|---|---|---|
| 1st | 56% | 44% | Suzan DelBene |
| 2nd | 61% | 39% | Rick Larsen |
| 3rd | 48% | 52% | Jaime Herrera Beutler |
| 4th | 41% | 59% | Dan Newhouse |
| 5th | 45% | 55% | Cathy McMorris Rodgers |
| 6th | 58% | 42% | Derek Kilmer |
| 7th | 83% | 17% | Jim McDermott |
| 7th | 83% | 17% | Pramila Jayapal |
| 8th | 51% | 49% | Dave Reichert |
| 9th | 72% | 28% | Adam Smith |
| 10th | 59% | 41% | Denny Heck |
