= 2012 Washington Insurance Commissioner election =

- November 6, 2012
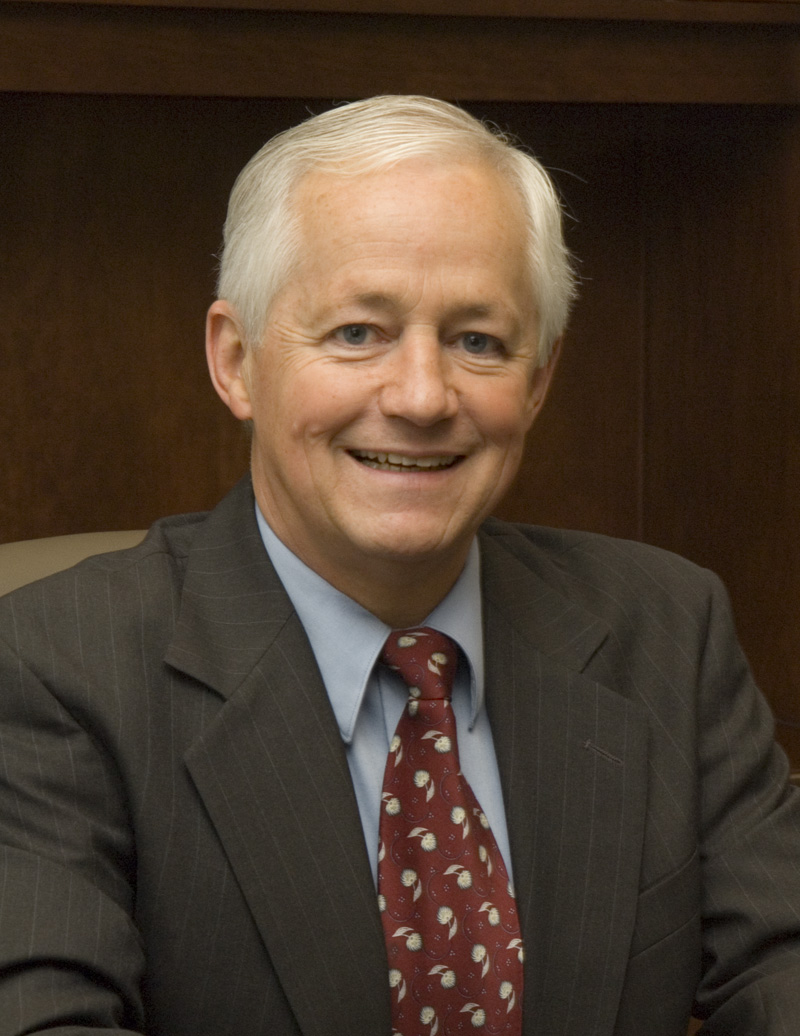

Candidate	Mike Kreidler	John Adams
Party	Democratic	Republican
Popular vote	1,662,555	1,188,926
Percentage	58.30%	41.70%
- Kreidler: 50–60% 60–70% 70–80% 80–90% Adams: 50–60% 60–70%
insurance commissioner before election
Mike Kreidler
Democratic
Elected insurance commissioner
Mike Kreidler
Democratic

The 2012 Washington Insurance Commissioner election was held on November 6, 2012, to elect the insurance commissioner of Washington, concurrently with the 2012 U.S. presidential election, as well as elections to the U.S. Senate and various state and local elections, including for U.S. House and governor of Washington. Incumbent Democratic Insurance Commissioner Mike Kreidler was re-elected to a fourth term in a landslide.

== Background ==
Incumbent Insurance Commissioner Mike Kreidler, first elected in 2000 and re-elected two times, most recently in 2008, ran for re-election to a fourth term in office.

== Primary election ==
Washington is one of two states that holds a top-two primary, meaning all candidates are listed on the same ballot regardless of party affiliation, and the top two advance to the general election.

=== Democratic candidates ===
==== Advanced to general ====
- Mike Kreidler, incumbent insurance commissioner (2001–2025)

=== Republican candidates ===
==== Advanced to general ====
- John Adams, insurance broker

==== Eliminated in primary ====
- Scott Reilly

=== Third-party and independent candidates ===
==== Eliminated in primary ====
- Brian C. Berend (Independent)

=== Endorsements ===
Mike Kreidler (D)

Newspapers

- The Seattle Times

=== Results ===
County results Kreidler: 30–40%; 40–50%; 50–60%; 60–70%; Adams: 30–40%; 40–50%; Reilly: 30–40%

Congressional district results Kreidler: 30–40%; 40–50%; 50–60%; 60–70%; 70–80%

Blanket primary results
Party	Candidate	Votes	%
Democratic	Mike Kreidler (incumbent)	712,095	54.91
Republican	John Adams	279,052	21.52
Republican	Scott Reilly	241,377	18.61
Independent	Brian C. Berend	64,303	4.96
Total votes		1,296,827	100.00

==== By county ====
Combined partisan vote by county Democratic: 40–50%; 50–60%; 60–70%; Republican: 40–50%; 50–60%; 60–70%

Combined partisan vote by congressional district Democratic: 50–60%; 60–70%; 70–80%; Republican: 40–50%; 50–60%

County results
County	Mike Kreidler Democratic		John Adams Republican		Scott Reilly Republican		Brian C. Berend Independent		Margin		Total votes
County	#	%	#	%	#	%	#	%	#	%	Total votes
Adams	602	26.60%	965	42.64%	578	25.54%	118	5.21%	-363	-16.04%	2,263
Asotin	1,752	38.80%	1,291	28.59%	1,054	23.34%	419	9.28%	461	10.21%	4,516
Benton	9,639	33.47%	9,170	31.85%	7,963	27.65%	2,023	7.03%	469	1.63%	28,795
Chelan	5,930	37.86%	5,125	32.72%	3,529	22.53%	1,081	6.90%	805	5.14%	15,665
Clallam	9,357	49.57%	4,377	23.19%	3,951	20.93%	1,191	6.31%	4,980	26.38%	18,876
Clark	28,135	44.78%	15,434	24.56%	15,272	24.30%	3,994	6.36%	12,701	20.21%	62,835
Columbia	297	29.70%	399	39.90%	223	22.30%	81	8.10%	-102	-10.20%	1,000
Cowlitz	8,281	47.53%	4,259	24.45%	3,207	18.41%	1,674	9.61%	4,022	23.09%	17,421
Douglas	2,360	34.30%	2,220	32.27%	1,818	26.42%	482	7.01%	140	2.03%	6,880
Ferry	583	36.97%	439	27.84%	409	25.94%	146	9.26%	144	9.13%	1,577
Franklin	2,771	32.38%	2,730	31.90%	2,525	29.51%	531	6.21%	41	0.48%	8,557
Garfield	144	27.91%	196	37.98%	145	28.10%	31	6.01%	-51	-9.88%	516
Grant	3,557	31.30%	3,653	32.14%	3,130	27.54%	1,025	9.02%	-96	-0.84%	11,365
Grays Harbor	7,547	55.44%	2,794	20.52%	2,065	15.17%	1,208	8.87%	4,753	34.91%	13,614
Island	11,480	52.52%	4,941	22.60%	4,269	19.53%	1,170	5.35%	6,539	29.91%	21,860
Jefferson	7,078	64.01%	1,764	15.95%	1,518	13.73%	698	6.31%	5,314	48.06%	11,058
King	270,824	68.06%	59,701	15.00%	55,001	13.82%	12,406	3.12%	211,123	53.06%	397,932
Kitsap	30,399	53.66%	12,696	22.41%	11,083	19.56%	2,471	4.36%	17,703	31.25%	56,649
Kittitas	3,255	42.65%	2,059	26.98%	1,800	23.59%	517	6.77%	1,196	15.67%	7,631
Klickitat	1,508	40.12%	1,071	28.49%	837	22.27%	343	9.12%	437	11.63%	3,759
Lewis	5,393	36.67%	4,920	33.46%	3,228	21.95%	1,164	7.92%	473	3.22%	14,705
Lincoln	851	30.03%	860	30.35%	942	33.24%	181	6.39%	-82	-2.89%	2,834
Mason	7,597	52.30%	3,230	22.24%	2,557	17.60%	1,141	7.86%	4,367	30.07%	14,525
Okanogan	2,969	38.98%	2,292	30.09%	1,774	23.29%	581	7.63%	677	8.89%	7,616
Pacific	3,038	52.81%	1,280	22.25%	934	16.24%	501	8.71%	1,758	30.56%	5,753
Pend Oreille	1,182	36.56%	858	26.54%	811	25.09%	382	11.82%	324	10.02%	3,233
Pierce	75,839	53.38%	32,900	23.16%	27,399	19.29%	5,925	4.17%	42,939	30.23%	142,063
San Juan	3,197	62.93%	858	16.89%	752	14.80%	273	5.37%	2,339	46.04%	5,080
Skagit	13,458	51.85%	6,157	23.72%	4,860	18.72%	1,481	5.71%	7,301	28.13%	25,956
Skamania	900	43.95%	544	26.56%	448	21.88%	156	7.62%	356	17.38%	2,048
Snohomish	72,819	54.93%	30,166	22.76%	23,877	18.01%	5,705	4.30%	42,653	32.17%	132,567
Spokane	41,128	44.13%	22,405	24.04%	23,140	24.83%	6,531	7.01%	17,988	19.30%	93,204
Stevens	3,218	31.94%	3,088	30.65%	2,878	28.56%	892	8.85%	130	1.29%	10,076
Thurston	34,756	62.58%	10,744	19.34%	7,543	13.58%	2,498	4.50%	24,012	43.23%	55,541
Wahkiakum	540	47.24%	274	23.97%	224	19.60%	105	9.19%	266	23.27%	1,143
Walla Walla	4,092	35.89%	3,530	30.96%	2,916	25.58%	863	7.57%	562	4.93%	11,401
Whatcom	22,125	53.72%	9,130	22.17%	8,281	20.11%	1,646	4.00%	12,995	31.56%	41,182
Whitman	2,738	42.12%	1,735	26.69%	1,580	24.30%	448	6.89%	1,003	15.43%	6,501
Yakima	10,756	37.57%	8,797	30.73%	6,856	23.95%	2,221	7.76%	1,959	6.84%	28,630
Totals	712,095	54.91%	279,052	21.52%	241,377	18.61%	64,303	4.96%	433,043	33.39%	1,296,827

Counties that flipped from Democratic to Republican

- Asotin (largest city: Clarkston)
- Clark (largest city: Vancouver)
- Klickitat (largest city: Goldendale)
- Skamania (largest city: Carson)
- Spokane (largest city: Spokane)

==== By congressional district ====
District	Kreidler	Adams	Reilly	Representative
1st	52%	24%	20%	Suzan DelBene
2nd	57%	21%	17%	Rick Larsen
3rd	44%	26%	22%	Jaime Herrera Beutler
4th	35%	32%	26%	Doc Hastings
5th	42%	26%	25%	Cathy McMorris Rodgers
6th	56%	21%	18%	Norm Dicks
7th	79%	9%	9%	Jim McDermott
8th	47%	26%	22%	Dave Reichert
9th	66%	17%	14%	Adam Smith
10th	57%	22%	17%	Denny Heck

== General election ==
=== Results ===
2012 Washington Insurance Commissioner election
Party	Candidate	Votes	%	±%
Democratic	Mike Kreidler (incumbent)	1,662,555	58.30	–3.08
Republican	John Adams	1,188,926	41.70	+3.08
Total votes		2,851,481	100.00	N/A
Democratic hold				

==== By county ====
County results
County	Mike Kreidler Democratic		John Adams Republican		Margin		Total votes
County	#	%	#	%	#	%	Total votes
Adams	1,463	33.49%	2,905	66.51%	-1,442	-33.01%	4,368
Asotin	3,933	43.39%	5,131	56.61%	-1,198	-13.22%	9,064
Benton	28,462	39.31%	43,933	60.69%	-15,471	-21.37%	72,395
Chelan	12,400	42.40%	16,846	57.60%	-4,446	-15.20%	29,246
Clallam	18,333	52.47%	16,610	47.53%	1,723	4.93%	34,943
Clark	87,743	50.47%	86,123	49.53%	1,620	0.93%	173,866
Columbia	677	33.50%	1,344	66.50%	-667	-33.00%	2,021
Cowlitz	21,727	53.15%	19,153	46.85%	2,574	6.30%	40,880
Douglas	5,223	38.17%	8,462	61.83%	-3,239	-23.67%	13,685
Ferry	1,300	41.71%	1,817	58.29%	-517	-16.59%	3,117
Franklin	8,535	40.09%	12,756	59.91%	-4,221	-19.83%	21,291
Garfield	359	31.41%	784	68.59%	-425	-37.18%	1,143
Grant	8,977	35.33%	16,431	64.67%	-7,454	-29.34%	25,408
Grays Harbor	15,628	58.88%	10,913	41.12%	4,715	17.76%	26,541
Island	20,744	53.81%	17,807	46.19%	2,937	7.62%	38,551
Jefferson	12,349	67.50%	5,945	32.50%	6,404	35.01%	18,294
King	613,284	70.76%	253,420	29.24%	359,864	41.52%	866,704
Kitsap	64,816	56.62%	49,669	43.38%	15,147	13.23%	114,485
Kittitas	7,437	46.15%	8,679	53.85%	-1,242	-7.71%	16,116
Klickitat	4,339	46.58%	4,977	53.42%	-638	-6.85%	9,316
Lewis	12,649	40.58%	18,522	59.42%	-5,873	-18.84%	31,171
Lincoln	1,802	33.33%	3,604	66.67%	-1,802	-33.33%	5,406
Mason	14,714	55.88%	11,619	44.12%	3,095	11.75%	26,333
Okanogan	6,944	45.06%	8,467	54.94%	-1,523	-9.88%	15,411
Pacific	5,531	57.06%	4,162	42.94%	1,369	14.12%	9,693
Pend Oreille	2,541	41.21%	3,625	58.79%	-1,084	-17.58%	6,166
Pierce	180,572	56.97%	136,366	43.03%	44,206	13.95%	316,938
San Juan	6,642	68.64%	3,035	31.36%	3,607	37.27%	9,677
Skagit	27,465	54.35%	23,068	45.65%	4,397	8.70%	50,533
Skamania	2,426	49.00%	2,525	51.00%	-99	-2.00%	4,951
Snohomish	177,861	58.42%	126,614	41.58%	51,247	16.83%	304,475
Spokane	98,790	48.14%	106,411	51.86%	-7,621	-3.71%	205,201
Stevens	7,570	37.09%	12,841	62.91%	-5,271	-25.82%	20,411
Thurston	74,631	63.60%	42,718	36.40%	31,913	27.19%	117,349
Wahkiakum	1,051	51.70%	982	48.30%	69	3.39%	2,033
Walla Walla	9,611	42.01%	13,268	57.99%	-3,657	-15.98%	22,879
Whatcom	53,270	56.65%	40,763	43.35%	12,507	13.30%	94,033
Whitman	7,423	48.65%	7,835	51.35%	-412	-2.70%	15,258
Yakima	33,333	46.21%	38,796	53.79%	-5,463	-7.57%	72,129
Totals	1,662,555	58.30%	1,188,926	41.70%	473,629	16.61%	2,851,481

Counties that flipped from Democratic to Republican

- Kittitas (largest city: Ellensburg)
- Klickitat (largest city: Goldendale)
- Skamania (largest city: Carson)
- Spokane (largest city: Spokane)
- Whitman (largest city: Pullman)

==== By congressional district ====
Kreidler won seven of ten congressional districts, including one that elected a Republican.

District	Kreidler	Adams	Representative
1st	55%	45%	Suzan DelBene
2nd	61%	39%	Rick Larsen
3rd	49.9%	50.1%	Jaime Herrera Beutler
4th	41%	59%	Doc Hastings
5th	46%	54%	Cathy McMorris Rodgers
6th	59%	41%	Derek Kilmer
7th	81%	19%	Jim McDermott
8th	52%	48%	Dave Reichert
9th	70%	30%	Adam Smith
10th	60%	40%	Denny Heck
