= 2008 Washington Insurance Commissioner election =

- November 4, 2008
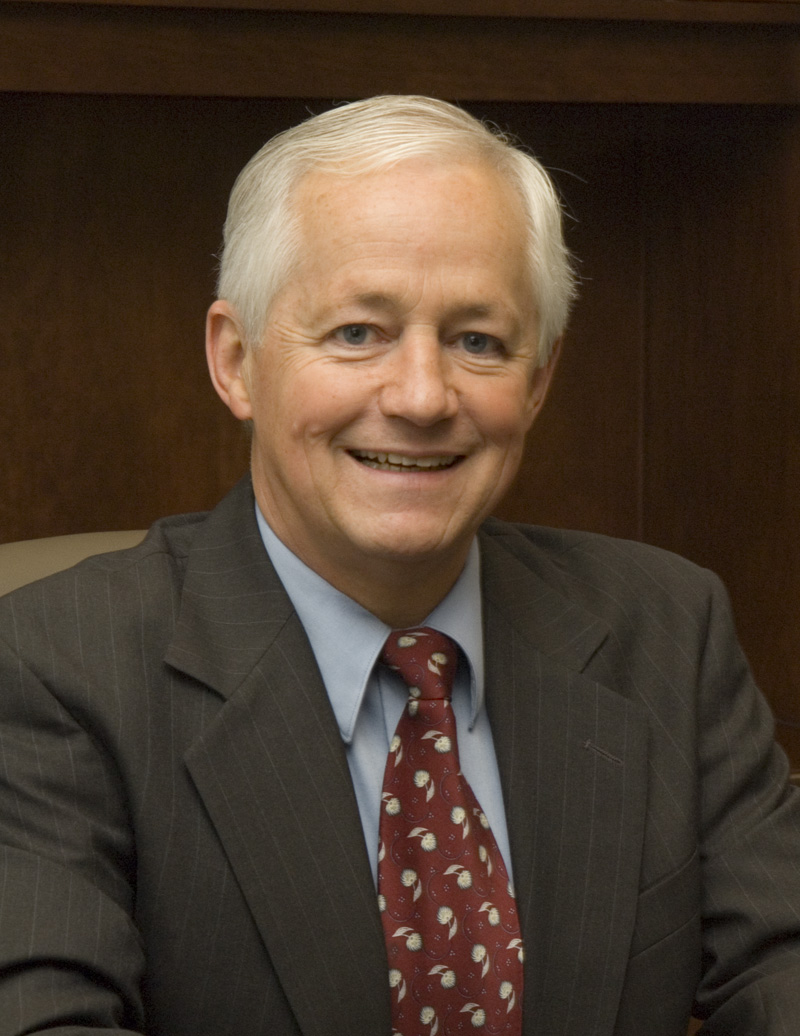

Candidate	Mike Kreidler	John Adams
Party	Democratic	Republican
Popular vote	1,679,696	1,056,693
Percentage	61.38%	38.62%
- Kreidler: 50–60% 60–70% 70–80% 80–90% Adams: 50–60% 60–70%
insurance commissioner before election
Mike Kreidler
Democratic
Elected insurance commissioner
Mike Kreidler
Democratic

The 2008 Washington Insurance Commissioner election was held on November 4, 2008, to elect the insurance commissioner of Washington, concurrently with the 2008 U.S. presidential election, as well as elections to the U.S. Senate and various state and local elections, including for U.S. House and governor of Washington. Incumbent Democratic Insurance Commissioner Mike Kreidler was re-elected to a third term in a landslide.

== Background ==
Incumbent Insurance Commissioner Mike Kreidler, first elected in 2000 and re-elected in 2004, ran for re-election to a third term in office.

== Primary election ==
Washington is one of two states that holds a top-two primary, meaning all candidates are listed on the same ballot regardless of party affiliation, and the top two advance to the general election.

=== Democratic candidates ===
==== Advanced to general ====
- Mike Kreidler, incumbent insurance commissioner (2001–2025)

=== Republican candidates ===
==== Advanced to general ====
- John Adams, insurance broker

=== Third-party and independent candidates ===
==== Eliminated in primary ====
- Curtis Fackler (Nonpartisan), chairman of the Spokane County Republican Party

=== Results ===
County results Kreidler: 40–50%; 50–60%; 60–70%; Adams: 40–50%; 50–60%

Congressional district results Kreidler: 50–60%; 70–80%; Adams: 40–50%; 50–60%

Blanket primary results
Party	Candidate	Votes	%
Democratic	Mike Kreidler (incumbent)	723,732	53.86
Republican	John Adams	484,992	36.09
Nonpartisan	Curtis Fackler	135,113	10.05
Total votes		1,343,837	100.00

==== By county ====
County	Mike Kreidler Democratic		John Adams Republican		Curtis Fackler Nonpartisan		Margin		Total
County	#	%	#	%	#	%	#	%	Total
Adams	762	31.22%	1,422	58.25%	257	10.53%	-660	-27.04%	2,441
Asotin	2,274	44.24%	2,198	42.76%	668	13.00%	76	1.48%	5,140
Benton	13,184	35.85%	19,012	51.70%	4,578	12.45%	-5,828	-15.85%	36,774
Chelan	6,434	39.41%	8,091	49.56%	1,801	11.03%	-1,657	-10.15%	16,326
Clallam	10,573	49.72%	8,348	39.26%	2,344	11.02%	2,225	10.46%	21,265
Clark	33,074	46.67%	28,785	40.61%	9,014	12.72%	4,289	6.05%	70,873
Columbia	431	31.28%	780	56.60%	167	12.12%	-349	-25.33%	1,378
Cowlitz	10,767	51.64%	7,372	35.36%	2,710	13.00%	3,395	16.28%	20,849
Douglas	3,064	37.52%	4,192	51.33%	911	11.15%	-1,128	-13.81%	8,167
Ferry	753	39.49%	872	45.73%	282	14.79%	-119	-6.24%	1,907
Franklin	3,853	36.11%	5,607	52.54%	1,211	11.35%	-1,754	-16.44%	10,671
Garfield	261	36.15%	388	53.74%	73	10.11%	-127	-17.59%	722
Grant	4,957	34.41%	7,613	52.84%	1,837	12.75%	-2,656	-18.44%	14,407
Grays Harbor	9,673	58.59%	5,091	30.84%	1,746	10.58%	4,582	27.75%	16,510
Island	12,250	51.57%	9,088	38.26%	2,418	10.18%	3,162	13.31%	23,756
Jefferson	7,649	61.37%	3,493	28.03%	1,321	10.60%	4,156	33.35%	12,463
King	219,664	65.70%	89,148	26.66%	25,522	7.63%	130,516	39.04%	334,334
Kitsap	34,698	54.07%	23,293	36.30%	6,177	9.63%	11,405	17.77%	64,168
Kittitas	4,057	43.51%	4,202	45.06%	1,066	11.43%	-145	-1.55%	9,325
Klickitat	2,154	43.74%	2,060	41.83%	711	14.44%	94	1.91%	4,925
Lewis	7,504	40.39%	8,836	47.56%	2,238	12.05%	-1,332	-7.17%	18,578
Lincoln	1,331	36.56%	1,851	50.84%	459	12.61%	-520	-14.28%	3,641
Mason	9,165	55.30%	5,625	33.94%	1,783	10.76%	3,540	21.36%	16,573
Okanogan	3,233	38.74%	3,917	46.93%	1,196	14.33%	-684	-8.20%	8,346
Pacific	3,586	55.92%	2,004	31.25%	823	12.83%	1,582	24.67%	6,413
Pend Oreille	1,402	38.13%	1,635	44.47%	640	17.41%	-233	-6.34%	3,677
Pierce	79,984	55.16%	52,962	36.52%	12,067	8.32%	27,022	18.63%	145,013
San Juan	3,768	59.69%	1,772	28.07%	773	12.24%	1,996	31.62%	6,313
Skagit	15,143	51.71%	11,153	38.08%	2,990	10.21%	3,990	13.62%	29,286
Skamania	1,139	48.30%	925	39.23%	294	12.47%	214	9.08%	2,358
Snohomish	77,092	55.27%	49,003	35.13%	13,398	9.60%	28,089	20.14%	139,493
Spokane	47,364	45.34%	42,135	40.33%	14,964	14.32%	5,229	5.01%	104,463
Stevens	4,050	33.87%	5,756	48.13%	2,153	18.00%	-1,706	-14.27%	11,959
Thurston	39,845	62.69%	18,687	29.40%	5,026	7.91%	21,158	33.29%	63,558
Wahkiakum	613	47.37%	480	37.09%	201	15.53%	133	10.28%	1,294
Walla Walla	4,913	38.58%	6,302	49.49%	1,518	11.92%	-1,389	-10.91%	12,733
Whatcom	24,093	52.39%	17,504	38.06%	4,389	9.54%	6,589	14.33%	45,986
Whitman	3,372	43.12%	3,458	44.22%	990	12.66%	-86	-1.10%	7,820
Yakima	15,603	39.07%	19,932	49.91%	4,397	11.01%	-4,329	-10.84%	39,932
Totals	723,732	53.86%	484,992	36.09%	135,113	10.05%	238,740	17.77%	1,343,837

==== By congressional district ====
District	Kreidler	Adams	Fackler	Representative
1st	58%	33%	9%	Jay Inslee
2nd	53%	37%	10%	Rick Larsen
3rd	51%	37%	12%	Brian Baird
4th	38%	50%	12%	Doc Hastings
5th	42.8%	43.0%	14%	Cathy McMorris Rodgers
6th	57%	34%	10%	Norm Dicks
7th	79%	14%	7%	Jim McDermott
8th	54%	38%	9%	Dave Reichert
9th	57%	35%	8%	Adam Smith

== General election ==
=== Endorsements ===
Mike Kreidler (D)

Newspapers

- The Seattle Times

=== Results ===
2008 Washington Insurance Commissioner election
Party	Candidate	Votes	%	±%
Democratic	Mike Kreidler (incumbent)	1,679,696	61.38	+6.93
Republican	John Adams	1,056,693	38.62	–2.74
Total votes		2,736,389	100.00	N/A
Democratic hold				

==== By county ====
County results
County	Mike Kreidler Democratic		John Adams Republican		Margin		Total votes
County	#	%	#	%	#	%	Total votes
Adams	1,629	37.41%	2,726	62.59%	-1,097	-25.19%	4,355
Asotin	4,275	48.22%	4,590	51.78%	-315	-3.55%	8,865
Benton	28,779	43.33%	37,634	56.67%	-8,855	-13.33%	66,413
Chelan	13,359	46.48%	15,381	53.52%	-2,022	-7.04%	28,740
Clallam	20,038	57.23%	14,978	42.77%	5,060	14.45%	35,016
Clark	89,531	54.39%	75,088	45.61%	14,443	8.77%	164,619
Columbia	769	38.90%	1,208	61.10%	-439	-22.21%	1,977
Cowlitz	24,100	58.97%	16,771	41.03%	7,329	17.93%	40,871
Douglas	5,947	43.52%	7,719	56.48%	-1,772	-12.97%	13,666
Ferry	1,487	47.74%	1,628	52.26%	-141	-4.53%	3,115
Franklin	8,102	44.03%	10,300	55.97%	-2,198	-11.94%	18,402
Garfield	446	37.23%	752	62.77%	-306	-25.54%	1,198
Grant	10,201	40.67%	14,883	59.33%	-4,682	-18.67%	25,084
Grays Harbor	17,126	64.01%	9,629	35.99%	7,497	28.02%	26,755
Island	22,031	57.57%	16,235	42.43%	5,796	15.15%	38,266
Jefferson	12,726	69.91%	5,478	30.09%	7,248	39.82%	18,204
King	580,666	72.13%	224,384	27.87%	356,282	44.26%	805,050
Kitsap	68,696	59.96%	45,878	40.04%	22,818	19.92%	114,574
Kittitas	8,109	50.94%	7,809	49.06%	300	1.88%	15,918
Klickitat	4,775	52.56%	4,309	47.44%	466	5.13%	9,084
Lewis	15,329	48.43%	16,325	51.57%	-996	-3.15%	31,654
Lincoln	2,206	41.32%	3,133	58.68%	-927	-17.36%	5,339
Mason	16,148	61.12%	10,271	38.88%	5,877	22.25%	26,419
Okanogan	7,452	49.18%	7,699	50.82%	-247	-1.63%	15,151
Pacific	6,112	62.15%	3,722	37.85%	2,390	24.30%	9,834
Pend Oreille	2,714	45.95%	3,192	54.05%	-478	-8.09%	5,906
Pierce	182,132	59.76%	122,622	40.24%	59,510	19.53%	304,754
San Juan	6,632	70.11%	2,827	29.89%	3,805	40.23%	9,459
Skagit	29,944	58.81%	20,970	41.19%	8,974	17.63%	50,914
Skamania	2,690	54.88%	2,212	45.12%	478	9.75%	4,902
Snohomish	182,605	62.29%	110,531	37.71%	72,074	24.59%	293,136
Spokane	105,917	52.94%	94,146	47.06%	11,771	5.88%	200,063
Stevens	8,467	42.19%	11,604	57.81%	-3,137	-15.63%	20,071
Thurston	78,485	67.28%	38,175	32.72%	40,310	34.55%	116,660
Wahkiakum	1,095	54.80%	903	45.20%	192	9.61%	1,998
Walla Walla	10,173	46.12%	11,885	53.88%	-1,712	-7.76%	22,058
Whatcom	55,309	61.24%	35,006	38.76%	20,303	22.48%	90,315
Whitman	8,259	53.46%	7,189	46.54%	1,070	6.93%	15,448
Yakima	35,235	48.85%	36,901	51.15%	-1,666	-2.31%	72,136
Totals	1,679,696	61.38%	1,056,693	38.62%	623,003	22.77%	2,736,389

Counties that flipped from Republican to Democratic

- Kittitas (largest city: Ellensburg)
- Klickitat (largest city: Goldendale)
- Spokane (largest city: Spokane)
- Whitman (largest city: Pullman)

==== By congressional district ====
Kreidler won eight of nine congressional districts, including two that elected Republicans.

District	Kreidler	Adams	Representative
1st	65%	35%	Jay Inslee
2nd	60%	40%	Rick Larsen
3rd	58%	42%	Brian Baird
4th	46%	54%	Doc Hastings
5th	51%	49%	Cathy McMorris Rodgers
6th	63%	37%	Norm Dicks
7th	85%	15%	Jim McDermott
8th	59%	41%	Dave Reichert
9th	62%	38%	Adam Smith
