= 2004 Washington Insurance Commissioner election =

- November 2, 2004
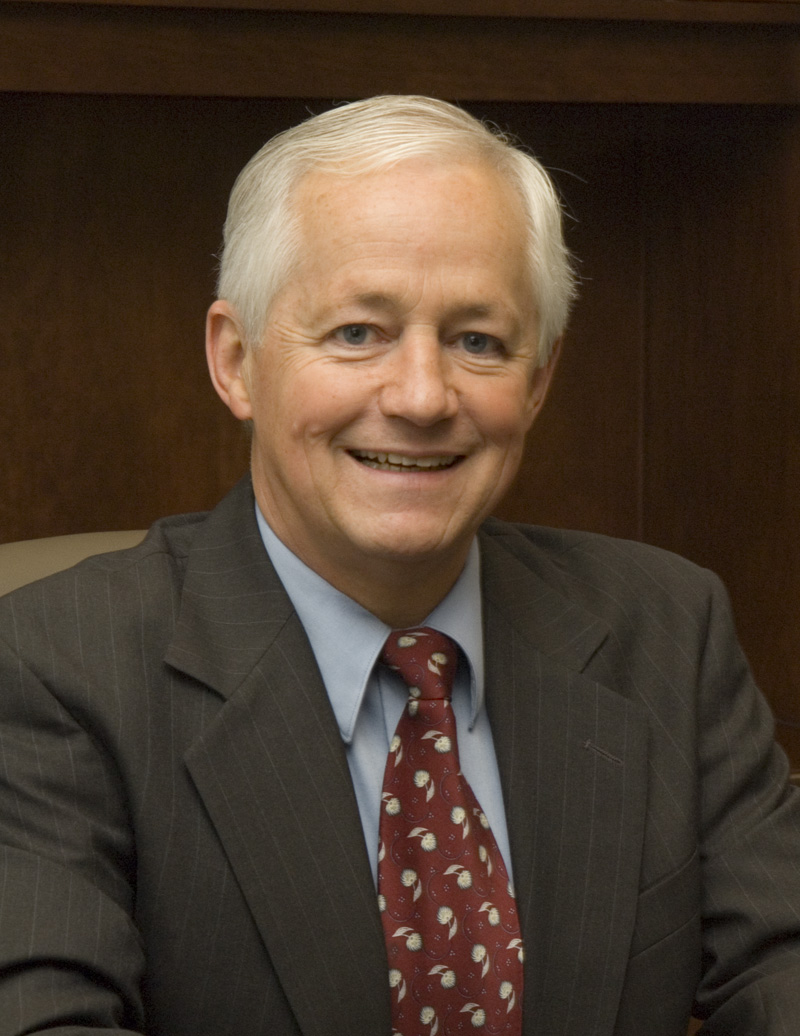

Candidate	Mike Kreidler	John Adams
Party	Democratic	Republican
Popular vote	1,393,764	1,058,583
Percentage	54.45%	41.36%
- Kreidler: 40–50% 50–60% 60–70% Adams: 40–50% 50–60% 60–70%
insurance commissioner before election
Mike Kreidler
Democratic
Elected insurance commissioner
Mike Kreidler
Democratic

The 2004 Washington Insurance Commissioner election was held on November 2, 2004, to elect the insurance commissioner of Washington, concurrently with the 2004 U.S. presidential election, as well as elections to the U.S. Senate and various state and local elections, including for U.S. House and governor of Washington. Primary elections took place on September 14.

Incumbent Democratic Insurance Commissioner Mike Kreidler was re-elected to a second term in a landslide.

== Background ==
Incumbent Insurance Commissioner Mike Kreidler, first elected in 2000, ran for re-election to a second term in office.

== Democratic primary ==
=== Candidates ===
==== Nominee ====
- Mike Kreidler, incumbent insurance commissioner (2001–2025)

=== Results ===
Democratic primary results
Party	Candidate	Votes	%
Democratic	Mike Kreidler (incumbent)	609,264	100.00%
Total votes		609,264	100.00%

== Republican primary ==
=== Candidates ===
==== Nominee ====
- John Adams, insurance broker

==== Eliminated in primary ====
- Earl C. Dennis
- Curtis Fackler, chairman of the Spokane County Republican Party

=== Results ===
Results by county Adams: 50–60%; 60–70%; Dennis: 60–70%

Republican primary results
Party	Candidate	Votes	%
Republican	John Adams	223,345	55.21%
Republican	Earl C. Dennis	100,812	24.92%
Republican	Curtis Fackler	80,394	19.87%
Total votes		404,551	100.00%

==== By county ====
County results
County	John Adams		Earl C. Dennis		Curtis Fackler		Margin		Total votes
County	#	%	#	%	#	%	#	%	Total votes
Adams	895	62.85%	303	21.28%	226	15.87%	592	41.57%	1,424
Asotin	845	56.33%	392	26.13%	263	17.53%	453	30.20%	1,500
Benton	8,327	62.10%	2,871	21.41%	2,210	16.48%	5,456	40.69%	13,408
Chelan	2,635	57.50%	1,201	26.21%	747	16.30%	1,434	31.29%	4,583
Clallam	3,617	61.56%	1,535	26.12%	724	12.32%	2,082	35.43%	5,876
Clark	11,022	54.32%	4,475	22.05%	4,794	23.63%	6,228	30.69%	20,291
Columbia	352	64.00%	133	24.18%	65	11.82%	219	39.82%	550
Cowlitz	2,264	54.44%	1,305	31.38%	590	14.19%	959	23.06%	4,159
Douglas	1,754	58.78%	766	25.67%	464	15.55%	988	33.11%	2,984
Ferry	501	59.57%	221	26.28%	119	14.15%	280	33.29%	841
Franklin	1,991	60.61%	794	24.17%	500	15.22%	1,197	36.44%	3,285
Garfield	200	59.00%	68	20.06%	71	20.94%	129	38.05%	339
Grant	3,173	56.56%	1,517	27.04%	920	16.40%	1,656	29.52%	5,610
Grays Harbor	1,815	66.61%	579	21.25%	331	12.15%	1,236	45.36%	2,725
Island	3,966	58.65%	1,765	26.10%	1,031	15.25%	2,201	32.55%	6,762
Jefferson	1,360	59.26%	609	26.54%	326	14.20%	751	32.72%	2,295
King	51,090	51.29%	25,827	25.93%	22,690	22.78%	25,263	25.36%	99,607
Kitsap	10,069	52.34%	4,812	25.01%	4,357	22.65%	5,257	27.33%	19,238
Kittitas	1,800	58.33%	665	21.55%	621	20.12%	1,135	36.78%	3,086
Klickitat	684	61.07%	269	24.02%	167	14.91%	415	37.05%	1,120
Lewis	3,740	64.21%	1,234	21.18%	851	14.61%	2,506	43.02%	5,825
Lincoln	888	57.81%	387	25.20%	261	16.99%	501	32.62%	1,536
Mason	2,181	61.78%	762	21.59%	587	16.63%	1,419	40.20%	3,530
Okanogan	2,415	66.20%	766	21.00%	467	12.80%	1,649	45.20%	3,648
Pacific	762	61.01%	326	26.10%	161	12.89%	436	34.91%	1,249
Pend Oreille	854	55.60%	428	27.86%	254	16.54%	426	27.73%	1,536
Pierce	24,467	52.00%	11,352	24.13%	11,231	23.87%	13,115	27.87%	47,050
San Juan	600	24.39%	1,477	60.04%	383	15.57%	-877	-35.65%	2,460
Skagit	4,466	56.28%	2,069	26.07%	1,400	17.64%	2,397	30.21%	7,935
Skamania	459	56.95%	195	24.19%	152	18.86%	264	32.75%	806
Snohomish	20,461	52.45%	11,339	29.07%	7,207	18.48%	9,122	23.39%	39,007
Spokane	22,644	58.60%	8,005	20.72%	7,990	20.68%	14,639	37.89%	38,639
Stevens	2,696	62.57%	969	22.49%	644	14.95%	1,727	40.08%	4,309
Thurston	8,271	60.66%	3,120	22.88%	2,243	16.45%	5,151	37.78%	13,634
Wahkiakum	136	59.39%	71	31.00%	22	9.61%	65	28.38%	229
Walla Walla	3,096	61.14%	1,219	24.07%	749	14.79%	1,877	37.07%	5,064
Whatcom	6,668	60.67%	2,459	22.37%	1,864	16.96%	4,209	38.29%	10,991
Whitman	1,819	57.93%	788	25.10%	533	16.97%	1,031	32.83%	3,140
Yakima	8,362	58.56%	3,739	26.18%	2,179	15.26%	4,623	32.37%	14,280
Totals	223,345	55.21%	100,812	24.92%	80,394	19.87%	122,533	30.29%	404,551

== Libertarian primary ==
=== Candidates ===
==== Nominee ====
- Stephen D. Steele

=== Results ===
Libertarian primary results
Party	Candidate	Votes	%
Libertarian	Stephen D. Steele	12,606	100.00%
Total votes		12,606	100.00%

== General election ==
=== Endorsements ===
Mike Kreidler (D)

Newspapers

- The Seattle Times

=== Results ===
2004 Washington Insurance Commissioner election
Party	Candidate	Votes	%	±%
Democratic	Mike Kreidler (incumbent)	1,393,764	54.45	+1.08
Republican	John Adams	1,058,583	41.36	–1.08
Libertarian	Stephen D. Steele	107,295	4.19	–
Total votes		2,559,642	100.00	N/A
Democratic hold				

==== By county ====
County	Mike Kreidler Democratic		John Adams Republican		Stephen D. Steele Libertarian		Margin		Total
County	#	%	#	%	#	%	#	%	Total
Adams	1,494	32.78%	2,944	64.59%	120	2.63%	-1,450	-31.81%	4,558
Asotin	3,377	42.90%	4,145	52.65%	350	4.45%	-768	-9.76%	7,872
Benton	21,625	36.57%	35,226	59.57%	2,285	3.86%	-13,601	-23.00%	59,136
Chelan	10,140	38.47%	15,148	57.47%	1,069	4.06%	-5,008	-19.00%	26,357
Clallam	15,916	50.34%	14,084	44.55%	1,614	5.11%	1,832	5.79%	31,614
Clark	73,022	48.49%	70,711	46.96%	6,860	4.56%	2,311	1.53%	150,593
Columbia	623	34.03%	1,134	61.93%	74	4.04%	-511	-27.91%	1,831
Cowlitz	21,030	54.76%	15,507	40.38%	1,864	4.85%	5,523	14.38%	38,401
Douglas	4,404	36.55%	7,224	59.95%	422	3.50%	-2,820	-23.40%	12,050
Ferry	1,204	41.04%	1,563	53.27%	167	5.69%	-359	-12.24%	2,934
Franklin	5,393	37.15%	8,554	58.93%	568	3.91%	-3,161	-21.78%	14,515
Garfield	356	31.87%	719	64.37%	42	3.76%	-363	-32.50%	1,117
Grant	8,009	34.05%	14,508	61.67%	1,007	4.28%	-6,499	-27.63%	23,524
Grays Harbor	14,431	57.00%	9,753	38.52%	1,135	4.48%	4,678	18.48%	25,319
Island	16,629	49.03%	15,961	47.06%	1,325	3.91%	668	1.97%	33,915
Jefferson	10,437	61.56%	5,681	33.51%	836	4.93%	4,756	28.05%	16,954
King	505,918	64.37%	248,662	31.64%	31,360	3.99%	257,256	32.73%	785,940
Kitsap	57,996	53.24%	46,221	42.43%	4,717	4.33%	11,775	10.81%	108,934
Kittitas	6,444	44.90%	7,258	50.57%	649	4.52%	-814	-5.67%	14,351
Klickitat	3,688	45.38%	3,984	49.02%	455	5.60%	-296	-3.64%	8,127
Lewis	11,368	40.28%	15,534	55.04%	1,320	4.68%	-4,166	-14.76%	28,222
Lincoln	1,736	35.07%	2,983	60.26%	231	4.67%	-1,247	-25.19%	4,950
Mason	12,170	53.47%	9,498	41.73%	1,094	4.81%	2,672	11.74%	22,762
Okanogan	5,781	40.73%	7,580	53.41%	832	5.86%	-1,799	-12.68%	14,193
Pacific	5,083	56.00%	3,542	39.02%	452	4.98%	1,541	16.98%	9,077
Pend Oreille	2,334	41.97%	2,882	51.83%	345	6.20%	-548	-9.85%	5,561
Pierce	153,367	53.31%	123,520	42.94%	10,803	3.76%	29,847	10.37%	287,690
San Juan	5,534	62.05%	2,828	31.71%	556	6.23%	2,706	30.34%	8,918
Skagit	24,066	50.82%	21,174	44.71%	2,118	4.47%	2,892	6.11%	47,358
Skamania	2,215	48.78%	2,032	44.75%	294	6.47%	183	4.03%	4,541
Snohomish	146,910	54.42%	112,157	41.55%	10,868	4.03%	34,753	12.87%	269,935
Spokane	84,058	45.86%	91,085	49.69%	8,162	4.45%	-7,027	-3.83%	183,305
Stevens	6,542	36.54%	10,369	57.92%	991	5.54%	-3,827	-21.38%	17,902
Thurston	62,758	61.13%	35,877	34.94%	4,036	3.93%	26,881	26.18%	102,671
Wahkiakum	916	48.52%	852	45.13%	120	6.36%	64	3.39%	1,888
Walla Walla	8,127	40.18%	11,361	56.17%	737	3.64%	-3,234	-15.99%	20,225
Whatcom	42,093	53.24%	33,103	41.87%	3,869	4.89%	8,990	11.37%	79,065
Whitman	7,234	46.09%	7,724	49.21%	738	4.70%	-490	-3.12%	15,696
Yakima	29,336	43.37%	35,495	52.48%	2,810	4.15%	-6,159	-9.11%	67,641
Totals	1,393,764	54.45%	1,058,583	41.36%	107,295	4.19%	335,181	13.09%	2,559,642

Counties that flipped from Republican to Democratic

- Clark (largest city: Vancouver)
- Island (largest city: Oak Harbor)
- Skamania (largest city: Carson)
