= Randy Tate =

American politician (born 1965)

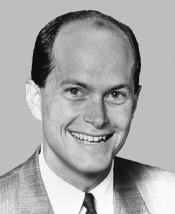

Member of the U.S. House of Representatives from Washington's 9th district
- In office January 3, 1995 – January 3, 1997
- Preceded by: Mike Kreidler
- Succeeded by: Adam Smith

Member of the Washington House of Representatives from the 25th district
- In office January 9, 1989 – January 9, 1995
- Preceded by: Dan Grimm
- Succeeded by: Grant Owen Pelesky

Personal details
- Born: Randall John Tate; November 23, 1965 (age 60) Puyallup, Washington, U.S.
- Party: Republican
- Spouse: Julie Wolcott
- Education: Tacoma Community College; Western Washington University (BA)

Randall John "Randy" Tate (born November 23, 1965) is an American politician and a former Republican member of the United States House of Representatives from Washington.

== Early life and education ==
Tate was born in Puyallup, Washington on November 23, 1965. He was raised in a trailer park with his Baptist minister father. Tate graduated with an Associate of Arts degree from Tacoma Community College in 1986 and he received a Bachelor of Arts degree from Western Washington University at Bellingham in 1988. Prior to running for office, he was a mobile-home park owner.

== Political career ==
=== Washington House of Representatives ===
From 1989 until 1995, Tate was a member of the Washington House of Representatives. Tate faced controversy in his initial election when his campaign sent a brochure to voters that said his Democratic opponent, State Superintendent Frank Brouillet, "hasn't talked much about sexual abuse of kids."

While in Olympia, Tate focused on lowering taxes, tort reform, and cracking down on crime. He was known for attacking Democrats, which led the Speaker of the House, Joseph E. King, to call him "a little puke," but was a rising star among Republicans, becoming the number two Republican in the House.

=== United States House of Representatives ===
In 1994, Tate ran for Congress in Washington's 9th congressional district against first-term incumbent Mike Kreidler. During the election, he openly distanced himself from Pat Robertson's Christian Coalition. In the November election, Tate narrowly defeated Kreidler, 51% to 49%, a margin of 5,500 votes. Tate was one of six Washington State Republicans to flip seats in the 1994 Republican Revolution.

Tate was the youngest of 73 GOP House freshmen when he took office in 1995 and was a close ally of Speaker Newt Gingrich. While in office, he secured passage of an amendment to the 1996 illegal immigration bill, which is now found at 8 U.S.C. 1182(a)(9). This amendment prohibits a visa or legal status to anyone who has been in the U.S. without authorization for over a year, notwithstanding the existence of U.S. Citizen children of that immigrant.

Tate ran for reelection in 1996, facing Democratic State Senator Adam Smith and was seen as one of the most vulnerable GOP incumbents. In the September primary, Tate came in second with 48% of the vote against Smith, who earned 49%, and was the only incumbent to finish behind a Democratic challenger in the primary. Smith criticized Tate for his close ties to Gingrich, his support for Medicare overhauls, and restrictions of environmental standards. Tate attacked Smith's ties to organized labor and said he would be in the pocket of special interests.

In the November general election, Smith defeated Tate, 50% to 47%, a margin of about 6,000 votes.

== Later life ==
After his one term in Congress, Tate wrote a twice-a-month column for the Federal Way News and was a guest host on KVI-AM talk-radio shows. From 1997 to 1999, Tate was the director of Pat Robertson's Christian Coalition.

U.S. House of Representatives
Preceded by Mike Kreidler	Member of the U.S. House of Representatives from Washington's 9th congressional district 1995–1997	Succeeded by Adam Smith
U.S. order of precedence (ceremonial)
Preceded by Mike Kreidler as Former U.S. Representative	Order of precedence of the United States as Former U.S. Representative	Succeeded by Bill Sali as Former U.S. Representative
