= Washington State Department of Early Learning =

Government organization in Olympia, United States

The Washington State Department of Early Learning, or DEL, was a Washington state agency responsible for early childhood education. The agency was informed by the Washington State Early Learning Advisory Council. Governor Inslee signed House Bill 1661 on July 6, 2017, creating the Washington Department of Children, Youth, and Families (DCYF), part of which includes the work that DEL used to do. Its director is Ross Hunter.

== About ==
DEL was founded in 2006 as a Governor's cabinet-level agency by combining programs formerly housed in three agencies that were focused on early learning and support services such as parent education. They included the Division of Child Care and Early Learning at the Department of Social and Health Services.

Among other things, the agency is noted for focusing on public-private partnerships. According to a publication from the European Union, Washington state law says,

"Except for licensing as required by Washington State law and to the extent allowed by federal law, the director of the department of early learning shall grant waivers from the rules of state agencies for the operation of early learning programs requested by non-governmental public-private partnerships to allow for flexibility to pursue market-based approaches to achieving the best outcomes for children and families."

== Duties ==
DEL licenses and monitors child care facilities. It oversees the Early Childhood Education and Assistance Program, a state-funded preschool program for low-income 3- and 4-year-olds. The agency sets policy for child care subsidy programs, and coordinates early intervention services for children birth to age 3 who have disabilities and/or developmental delays, including providing specialized instruction, speech therapy, occupational therapy, or physical therapy.

The agency partners with the Department of Social and Health Services and the Office of Superintendent of Public Instruction on a variety of issues.
