= Ross Hunter (politician) =

American politician from Washington

Member of the Washington House of Representatives from the 48th district
- In office January 13, 2003 – September 7, 2015
- Preceded by: Luke Esser
- Succeeded by: Patty Kuderer

Personal details
- Born: September 15, 1961 (age 65) Philadelphia, Pennsylvania, U.S.
- Party: Democratic
- Education: Yale University (BS)

Ross A. Hunter (born September 15, 1961) is an American politician. A member of the Democratic Party, he served in the Washington House of Representatives, representing the 48th district from 2003 to 2015.

== Political career ==
Hunter was elected to the Washington House of Representatives in 2002, representing the 48th legislative district as a Democrat. He served as the chairman of the House Appropriations Committee, where he oversaw the drafting of the state's bi-annual operating budget, and was a member of the Washington State Economic Revenue Forecast Council.

- Appropriations
- Economic and Revenue Forecast Council

Hunter resigned from the State House in 2015 when Governor Jay Inslee appointed him to direct the Washington State Department of Early Learning.

== Personal life ==
After graduating from Yale University with a B.S. in computer science, Hunter's first job out of college was at Microsoft. He spent 17 years with the company and rose to be a general manager.

Hunter lives with his wife in Medina, Washington. Hunter is active in local charities. Hunter serves on the steering committee for Bellevue Quality Schools and has a long history of working with children in Cub Scouts. He has also served as a trustee of the Bellevue Schools Foundation from 2001 to 2010 and as a board member of Hopelink, the Eastside's largest nonprofit human services agency, from 2004 to 2010.
