= Lela Kreidler =

American politician

Member of the Washington Senate from the 22nd district
- In office January 8, 1991 – April 18, 1991
- Preceded by: Mike Kreidler
- Succeeded by: Mike Kreidler

Personal details
- Born: 1944 (age 81–82) Oregon, United States
- Party: Democratic
- Spouse: Mike Kreidler
- Children: 3

Lela Kreidler (born 1944) is an American politician who served in the Washington State Senate from January 8, 1991, to April 18, 1991. She was appointed to the seat while her husband, Mike Kreidler, on active duty with the United States Army.
