= Patty Kuderer =

American politician and attorney (born 1958)

9th Insurance Commissioner of Washington
- Incumbent
- Assumed office January 15, 2025
- Governor: Bob Ferguson
- Preceded by: Mike Kreidler

Member of the Washington Senate from the 48th district
- In office January 5, 2017 – January 7, 2025
- Preceded by: Cyrus Habib
- Succeeded by: Vandana Slatter

Member of the Washington House of Representatives from the 48th district
- In office January 12, 2015 – January 5, 2017
- Preceded by: Ross Hunter
- Succeeded by: Vandana Slatter

Personal details
- Born: 1958 (age 67–68) Minneapolis, Minnesota, U.S.
- Party: Democratic
- Education: University of Minnesota (BA); William Mitchell College of Law (JD)
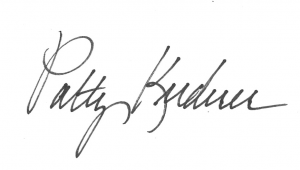
- Signature
- Website: State Senate website

Patricia Eileen Kuderer (born 1958) is an American politician and attorney who is serving as the 9th Insurance Commissioner of Washington since 2025. She previously served as a member of the Washington State Senate for the 48th district from 2017 to 2025. She was appointed to the State Senate after Cyrus Habib was elected lieutenant governor. In 2024, Kuderer was elected as Insurance Commissioner of Washington, succeeding Mike Kreidler.

== Early life and education ==
Kuderer was born in Minneapolis. She earned a Bachelor of Arts in history from the University of Minnesota and a Juris Doctor from the William Mitchell College of Law (now the Mitchell Hamline School of Law).

== Political career ==
The King County Council appointed Kuderer to the Washington House of Representatives in 2015, following the resignation of Ross Hunter. Following the election of Cyrus Habib to be lieutenant governor of Washington in 2016, county and state Democrats chose Kuderer to succeed Habib in the Washington State Senate in January 2017.

In 2019, Kuderer sponsored a bill to require presidential candidates to release five years of tax returns to qualify for the Washington state primary and general election ballots. Kuderer's bill is similar to legislation proposed in at least 25 other states, which have begun a debate on the Constitutional authority for states to make the tax return release a requirement. The bill was signed into law on April 26, 2019.

On January 20, 2020, a complaint was filed by the Washington Asians for Equality and the American Coalition for Equality for Kuderer's use of the phrase "Chinese fire drill" during a committee hearing on January 17. Kuderer had apologized at the January 20 session of the committee, before the complaint was filed.

Kuderer sponsored a bill to prohibit open carry of weapons around the state Capitol and around permitted public demonstrations, that was signed into law on May 12, 2021. In April 2023 Kuderer supported a bill that would ban the import, manufacture and sale of guns defined as assault weapons.

In the 2024 election, Kuderer ran for Insurance Commissioner of Washington. She defeated Republican state Senator Phil Fortunato in the general election with 57% of the vote.

Political offices
Preceded by Mike Kreidler	Insurance Commissioner of Washington; 2025–present	Incumbent
