= Deborah Senn =

American insurance commissioner (1949–2022)

7th Insurance Commissioner of Washington
- In office January 13, 1993 – January 10, 2001
- Governor: Mike Lowry; Gary Locke
- Preceded by: Richard G. "Dick" Marquardt
- Succeeded by: Mike Kreidler

Personal details
- Born: Deborah Mandel Senn; March 8, 1949 Chicago, Illinois, U.S.
- Died: February 18, 2022 (aged 72) Seattle, Washington, U.S.
- Party: Democratic
- Spouse: Rudi Bertschi
- Education: University of Illinois at Urbana–Champaign (BA); University of Illinois at Urbana–Champaign (MA); Loyola University Chicago School of Law (JD)

Deborah Mandel Senn (March 8, 1949 – February 18, 2022) was an American lawyer and politician of the Democratic Party. She was the 7th Washington Insurance Commissioner for two terms from 1993 to 2001. In 2000, in lieu of running for re-election, she ran for the U.S. Senate, losing in the Democratic primary election to Maria Cantwell. In 2004, she unsuccessfully ran for Attorney General, narrowly defeating Mark Sidran by less than 10,000 votes in the primary, but losing to Rob McKenna in the general election. Senn also has been partner in a law firm. She is a first cousin, once-removed of former Washington State Representative Tana Senn.

Deborah Senn was raised in Chicago's South Shore neighborhood. Senn served as chief counsel in Illinois Governor James R. Thompson's Office of Consumer Services.

On February 18, 2022, Senn died from pancreatic cancer in Seattle at the age of 72.

== Electoral history ==
Washington Attorney General, 2004 General Election
Party	Candidate	Votes	%	±%
Republican	Rob McKenna	1,425,368	52.98	
Democratic	Deborah Senn	1,163,964	43.27	
Libertarian	J. Bradley Gibson	56,792	2.11	
Green	Paul Richmond	44,020	1.64	

Washington Attorney General, 2004 Democratic Primary Election
Party	Candidate	Votes	%	±%
Democratic	Deborah Senn	365,922	50.68	
Democratic	Mark Sidran	356,125	49.32	

U.S. Senator, Class 1, from Washington, 2000 Democratic Primary Election
Party	Candidate	Votes	%	±%
Democratic	Maria Cantwell	472,609	70.55	
Democratic	Deborah Senn	168,110	25.10	
Democratic	Barbara Lampert	15,150	2.26	
Democratic	Robert Tilden Medley	14,009	2.09	

Washington state Insurance Commissioner, 1996 General Election
Party	Candidate	Votes	%	±%
Democratic	Deborah Senn	1,163,832	55.36	+5.21
Republican	Anthony "Tony" Lowe	872,280	41.49	
Natural Law	Steve Sevick	66,348	3.16	

Washington state Insurance Commissioner, 1996 Democratic Primary Election
Party	Candidate	Votes	%	±%
Democratic	Deborah Senn	571,167	100.00	+37.02

Washington state Insurance Commissioner, 1992 General Election
Party	Candidate	Votes	%	±%
Democratic	Deborah Senn	1,049,231	50.15	
Republican	Richard G. "Dick" Marquardt (incumbent)	894,551	42.76	−13.72
Independent	Brian McCulloch	148,280	7.09	

Washington state Insurance Commissioner, 1992 Democratic Primary Election
Party	Candidate	Votes	%	±%
Democratic	Deborah Senn	284,083	62.98	
Democratic	Marj Wilkerson	166,988	37.02	

Washington State Senate, 37th Legislative District, 1990 Democratic Primary Election
Party	Candidate	Votes	%	±%
Democratic	Dwight Pelz	2,977	30.92	
Democratic	Deborah Senn	2,355	24.46	
Democratic	Steve Shulman	1,936	20.11	
Democratic	Walt Hubbard	1,371	14.24	
Democratic	Dee Anderson	899	9.34	
Democratic	Robert J. May	91	0.95	

Illinois General Assembly, 3rd District, 1982 Democratic Primary Election
Party	Candidate	Votes	%	±%
Democratic	Lee Preston	8,053	56.33	
Democratic	Deborah Mandel Senn	6,243	43.67	
