= 2000 Washington Insurance Commissioner election =

- November 7, 2000
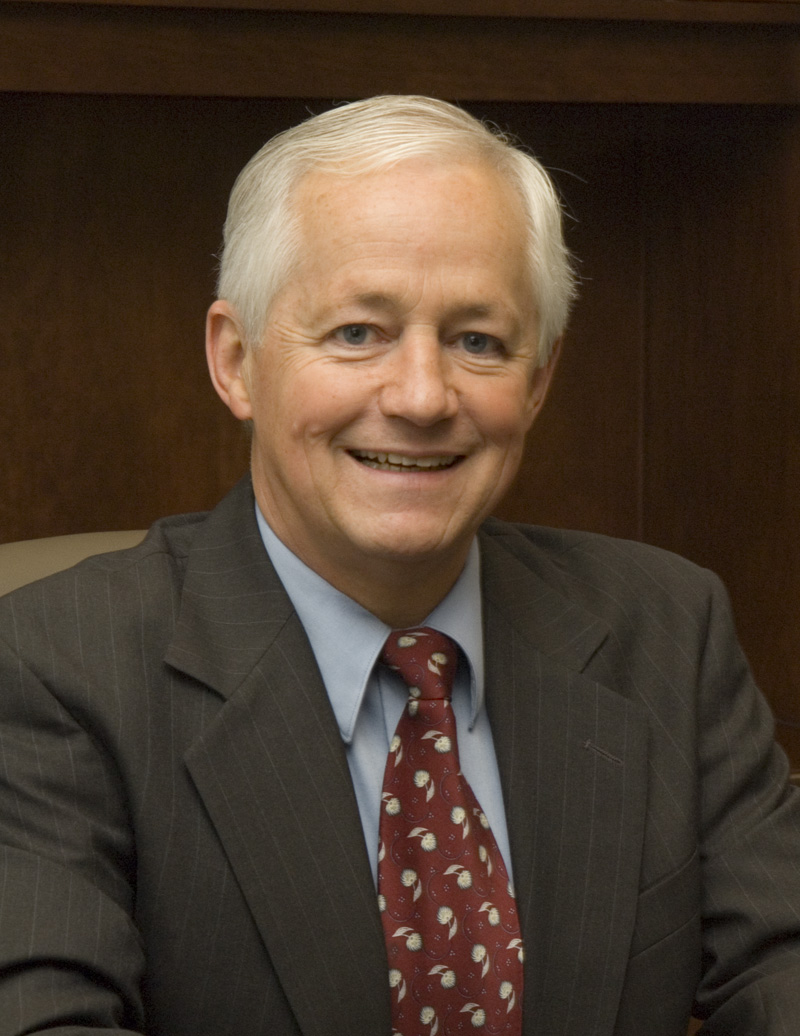

Candidate	Mike Kreidler	Don Davidson
Party	Democratic	Republican
Popular vote	1,174,039	933,568
Percentage	53.37%	42.44%
- Kreidler: 40–50% 50–60% 60–70% Davidson: 40–50% 50–60% 60–70%
insurance commissioner before election
Deborah Senn
Democratic
Elected insurance commissioner
Mike Kreidler
Democratic

The 2000 Washington Insurance Commissioner election was held on November 7, 2000, to elect the insurance commissioner of Washington, concurrently with the 2000 U.S. presidential election, as well as elections to the U.S. Senate and various state and local elections, including for U.S. House and governor of Washington.

Incumbent Democratic Insurance Commissioner Deborah Senn retired to run for U.S. Senate. Democratic former U.S. Representative Mike Kreidler defeated Republican former Bellevue Mayor Don Davidson to succeed Senn.

== Candidates ==
=== Democratic Party ===
==== Advanced to general ====
- Mike Kreidler, former U.S. representative for Washington's 9th congressional district (1993–1995)

==== Eliminated in primary ====
- John Conniff, deputy insurance commissioner for health policy

==== Declined ====
- Deborah Senn, incumbent insurance commissioner (1993–2001) (ran for U.S. Senate)

=== Republican Party ===
==== Advanced to general ====
- Don Davidson, former mayor of Bellevue

==== Eliminated in primary ====
- Curtis Fackler, businessman

=== Libertarian Party ===
==== Advanced to general ====
- Mike Hihn, political consultant

== Primary election ==
The blanket primary was held on September 19.

=== Endorsements ===
John Conniff (D)

Organizations

- National Abortion and Reproductive Rights Action League

Tribes

- Muckleshoot Tribe
Don Davidson (R)

Organizations

- Mainstream Republicans of Washington
Mike Hihn (L)

Political parties

- Libertarian Party of Washington
Mike Kreidler (D)

Labor unions

- AFL-CIO
- Washington Education Association
- Washington State Labor Council

=== Results ===
Blanket primary results
Party	Candidate	Votes	%
Democratic	Mike Kreidler	371,231	33.34
Republican	Don Davidson	326,158	29.29
Democratic	John Conniff	235,332	21.13
Republican	Curtis Fackler	134,784	12.10
Libertarian	Mike Hihn	46,112	4.14
Total votes		1,113,617	100.00

== General election ==
=== Results ===
2000 Washington Insurance Commissioner election
Party	Candidate	Votes	%	±%
Democratic	Mike Kreidler	1,174,039	53.37	–1.99
Republican	Don Davidson	933,568	42.44	+0.95
Libertarian	Mike Hihn	92,185	4.19	+1.03
Total votes		2,199,792	100.00	N/A
Democratic hold				

==== By county ====
County	Mike Kreidler Democratic		Don Davidson Republican		Mike Hihn Libertarian		Margin		Total
County	#	%	#	%	#	%	#	%	Total
Adams	1,535	34.89%	2,716	61.73%	149	3.39%	-1,181	-26.84%	4,400
Asotin	3,078	44.08%	3,609	51.69%	295	4.23%	-531	-7.61%	6,982
Benton	20,981	39.75%	29,859	56.57%	1,947	3.69%	-8,878	-16.82%	52,787
Chelan	8,563	36.47%	14,046	59.83%	868	3.70%	-5,483	-23.35%	23,477
Clallam	13,321	47.80%	13,027	46.75%	1,518	5.45%	294	1.06%	27,866
Clark	55,518	46.44%	58,519	48.95%	5,504	4.60%	-3,001	-2.51%	119,541
Columbia	587	32.08%	1,176	64.26%	67	3.66%	-589	-32.19%	1,830
Cowlitz	17,698	53.38%	14,065	42.42%	1,390	4.19%	3,633	10.96%	33,153
Douglas	4,227	36.33%	6,988	60.06%	420	3.61%	-2,761	-23.73%	11,635
Ferry	1,043	38.63%	1,479	54.78%	178	6.59%	-436	-16.15%	2,700
Franklin	5,095	40.80%	6,952	55.66%	442	3.54%	-1,857	-14.87%	12,489
Garfield	409	35.97%	677	59.54%	51	4.49%	-268	-23.57%	1,137
Grant	7,634	35.18%	13,112	60.43%	953	4.39%	-5,478	-25.25%	21,699
Grays Harbor	13,932	58.53%	8,779	36.88%	1,091	4.58%	5,153	21.65%	23,802
Island	13,781	47.58%	14,004	48.35%	1,181	4.08%	-223	-0.77%	28,966
Jefferson	8,010	56.69%	5,367	37.98%	753	5.33%	2,643	18.70%	14,130
King	415,171	61.33%	234,173	34.59%	27,648	4.08%	180,998	26.74%	676,992
Kitsap	49,075	52.43%	40,293	43.05%	4,231	4.52%	8,782	9.38%	93,599
Kittitas	5,532	44.01%	6,502	51.73%	536	4.26%	-970	-7.72%	12,570
Klickitat	3,084	43.50%	3,632	51.23%	374	5.28%	-548	-7.73%	7,090
Lewis	10,656	39.58%	15,064	55.95%	1,202	4.46%	-4,408	-16.37%	26,922
Lincoln	1,535	33.90%	2,791	61.64%	202	4.46%	-1,256	-27.74%	4,528
Mason	10,848	53.84%	8,343	41.41%	956	4.75%	2,505	12.43%	20,147
Okanogan	4,818	36.88%	7,493	57.36%	752	5.76%	-2,675	-20.48%	13,063
Pacific	4,597	56.73%	3,145	38.81%	362	4.47%	1,452	17.92%	8,104
Pend Oreille	2,076	42.47%	2,494	51.02%	318	6.51%	-418	-8.55%	4,888
Pierce	135,829	55.58%	98,925	40.48%	9,626	3.94%	36,904	15.10%	244,380
San Juan	4,156	56.68%	2,719	37.08%	458	6.25%	1,437	19.60%	7,333
Skagit	20,337	49.76%	18,791	45.98%	1,744	4.27%	1,546	3.78%	40,872
Skamania	1,667	44.05%	1,776	46.93%	341	9.01%	-109	-2.88%	3,784
Snohomish	122,619	53.87%	95,842	42.11%	9,148	4.02%	26,777	11.76%	227,609
Spokane	73,980	47.77%	74,492	48.10%	6,402	4.13%	-512	-0.33%	154,874
Stevens	5,941	36.94%	9,167	57.00%	975	6.06%	-3,226	-20.06%	16,083
Thurston	54,701	61.68%	30,478	34.37%	3,505	3.95%	24,223	27.31%	88,684
Wahkiakum	841	49.65%	772	45.57%	81	4.78%	69	4.07%	1,694
Walla Walla	7,503	39.66%	10,670	56.40%	746	3.94%	-3,167	-16.74%	18,919
Whatcom	32,129	49.88%	29,360	45.58%	2,922	4.54%	2,769	4.30%	64,411
Whitman	6,129	44.12%	7,174	51.64%	590	4.25%	-1,045	-7.52%	13,893
Yakima	25,403	40.48%	35,097	55.92%	2,259	3.60%	-9,694	-15.45%	62,759
Totals	1,174,039	53.37%	933,568	42.44%	92,185	4.19%	240,471	10.93%	2,199,792

Counties that flipped from Democratic to Republican

- Asotin (largest city: Clarkston)
- Benton (largest city: Kennewick)
- Clark (largest city: Vancouver)
- Ferry (largest city: Republic)
- Franklin (largest city: Pasco)
- Island (largest city: Oak Harbor)
- Kittitas (largest city: Ellensburg)
- Klickitat (largest city: Goldendale)
- Okanogan (largest city: Omak)
- Pend Oreille (largest city: Newport)
- Skamania (largest city: Carson)
- Spokane (largest city: Spokane)
- Walla Walla (largest city: Walla Walla)
- Whitman (largest city: Pullman)
