= Mike Kreidler =

8th Insurance Commissioner of Washington

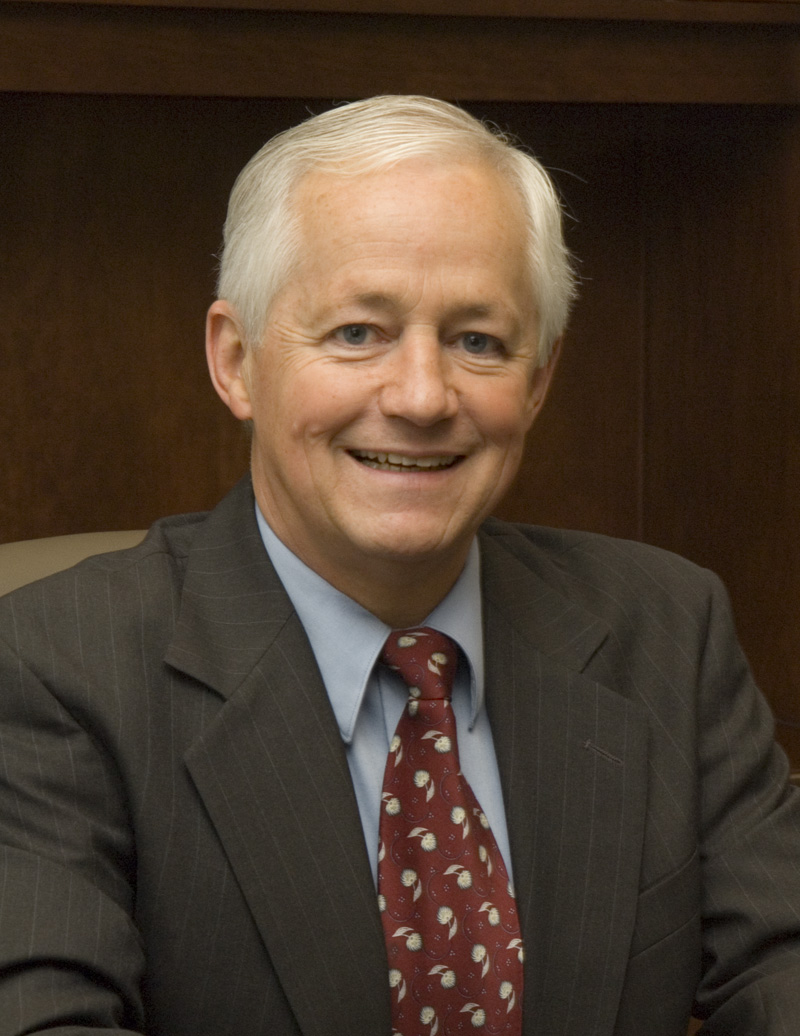
- Kreidler in 2005

8th Insurance Commissioner of Washington
- In office January 10, 2001 – January 15, 2025
- Governor: Gary Locke; Christine Gregoire; Jay Inslee
- Preceded by: Deborah Senn
- Succeeded by: Patty Kuderer

Member of the U.S. House of Representatives from Washington's 9th district
- In office January 3, 1993 – January 3, 1995
- Preceded by: Constituency established
- Succeeded by: Randy Tate

Member of the Washington Senate from the 22nd district
- In office April 18, 1991 – January 11, 1993
- Preceded by: Lela Kreidler
- Succeeded by: Karen Fraser
- In office January 14, 1985 – January 8, 1991
- Preceded by: Dick Hemstad
- Succeeded by: Lela Kreidler

Member of the Washington House of Representatives from the 22nd district
- In office January 10, 1977 – January 14, 1985
- Preceded by: Del Bausch
- Succeeded by: Jolene Unsoeld

Personal details
- Born: Myron Bradford Kreidler; September 28, 1943 (age 82) Tacoma, Washington, U.S.
- Party: Democratic
- Spouse: Lela Kreidler
- Children: 3
- Education: Pacific University (BS); University of California, Los Angeles (OD, MPH)

Military service
- Allegiance: United States
- Branch/service: United States Army
- Rank: Lieutenant Colonel
- Unit: United States Army Reserve

Myron Bradford “Mike” Kreidler (born September 28, 1943) is an American physician and politician who previously served as the eighth Washington Insurance Commissioner. A member of the Democratic Party, he previously served one term in the U.S. Congress, representing Washington's 9th congressional district.

At a total of 24 years and six terms in office, Kreidler is the second longest serving person to hold the office.

== Education and early career ==
Kreidler holds a bachelor's degree from Pacific University in Forest Grove, Oregon. After his US Army service as an optometry officer, he earned a doctor of optometry and a master of public health degree in health administration from the UCLA School of Public Health.

He was employed as an optometrist by Group Health Cooperative of the Puget Sound in the Olympia clinic for twenty years. In 1973, he won a seat on the North Thurston School Board. He also served in the Washington State Legislature for 16 years.

== Political career ==
Kreidler served 16 years in the Washington Legislature. He was in the Washington House of Representatives from 1976 to 1984 and then the Washington State Senate from 1984 to 1992. He was elected to the United States Congress as a Representative from the 9th congressional district of Washington in 1992. He was defeated by Republican Randy Tate in 1994.

Following his re-election defeat to Congress in 1994, he was appointed to the Northwest Power Planning Council in 1995 by Washington Governor Mike Lowry and subsequently re-appointed by Governor Gary Locke. He served on the NWPPC until 1998 when he was appointed Regional Director for the United States Department of Health and Human Services's Region 10 office in Seattle, Washington, serving in that post until 2000, when he resigned in order to seek election to the office of Washington State Insurance Commissioner.

Kreidler is Washington's eighth insurance commissioner. He was first elected as insurance commissioner in 2000. He was re-elected to a sixth term in 2020, winning 65% of the vote, the best performance for a statewide Democrat in that election cycle.

He retired as a lieutenant colonel from the Army Reserves with 20 years of service.

=== Health care ===
Kreidler has focused on health reform most of his career and worked to implement the Affordable Care Act in Washington state. He was the first insurance commissioner to reject President Obama's proposal to give insurers another year to sell pre-Affordable Care Act plans and testified before Congress on the law's impact on Washington state.

He has opposed efforts by the Trump administration to dismantle the Affordable Care Act, including coverage for pre-existing conditions and limiting the sale of short-term medical plans.

==== Surprise billing ====
In 2019, Kreidler proposed legislation banning the practice of surprise medical billing. After several extreme cases were highlighted in the news, support for his proposal increased and the bill was signed into law later that year.

==== Health care sharing ministries ====
Kreidler has taken action against fake health sharing ministries and in 2019, he fined one company and its affiliate more than $1 million for selling sham health sharing ministry memberships in Washington state to thousands of consumers.

=== Climate change ===
Since 2007, Kreidler has chaired the National Association of Insurance Commissioners' Climate Change and Global Warming Work Group. He led a successful push for insurers to disclose if and how they are preparing for the potential risks associated with climate change.

== Controversies ==
- The Seattle Times editorialized that Kreidler was "slow to stand up for the tens of thousands of families struggling to get necessary care for loved ones with mental illness. Astoundingly, his office has not taken a single enforcement action on the law, and a proposed rule to strengthen enforcement has languished in his office for two years." It took class-action attorneys to win a judgment at the Washington Supreme Court for those with autism being denied care by insurers, with no help from Kreidler.
- Taxpayers paid a $450,000 settlement to whistleblower after State Auditor Troy Kelley refused to investigate her complaint against a Kreidler chief deputy—there was no discipline for the chief deputy.
- Taxpayers paid $50,000 settlement, following a $20,000 investigation, after a Kreidler chief deputy allegedly harassed a worker who was forced to borrow sick leave from co-workers while the chief deputy enjoyed two months of paid leave before finally being dismissed.
- Kreidler had a chief deputy quit following a 2013 hallway argument over a plant Kreidler wanted to accept as a gift from a special interest. Most executive staff followed.
- In June 2017, Washington's health insurers announced that they were increasing rates for 2018 by an average of over 22 percent. Kreidler had, just days before his 2016 re-election, dismissed 2017 increases averaging 13.6% as "a one-time adjustment." A July 2017 Seattle Times article described Kreidler as "sympathetic to insurers" despite their huge surpluses.

== Misconduct allegations ==
In April 2022, The Seattle Times reported that several former employees or interviewed candidates for positions in the Office of the Insurance Commissioner had described racist or derogatory terms used by Kreidler from 2017 to 2022. The report also alleged that he had asked for "unusual favors" from non-white employees and that Kreidler had been "demeaning or rude" in interactions. Governor Jay Inslee and the majority and minority leaders of both legislative chambers asked Kriedler to resign due to the allegations, his admittance of fault, and the firing of an aide who had been critical of Kriedler's behavior. Kriedler stated in June 2022 that he would not resign; on May 1, 2023, he announced that he would not run for a seventh term in the 2024 election.

== Personal life ==
Kreidler resides in Lacey, Washington with his wife, Lela Kreidler. They have three grown children and three grandchildren. He is a member of several professional and fraternal organizations. He retired from the United States Army Reserve as a Lieutenant Colonel, after serving on active duty as an optometrist during the Vietnam and first Persian Gulf wars.

U.S. House of Representatives
New constituency	Member of the U.S. House of Representatives from Washington's 9th congressional district 1993–1995	Succeeded by Randy Tate
Political offices
Preceded by Deborah Senn	Insurance Commissioner of Washington; 2001–2025	Succeeded by Patty Kuderer
U.S. order of precedence (ceremonial)
Preceded by Rick Berg as Former U.S. Representative	Order of precedence of the United States as Former U.S. Representative	Succeeded by Randy Tate as Former U.S. Representative
