= Adam Smith (Washington politician) =

American politician (born 1965)

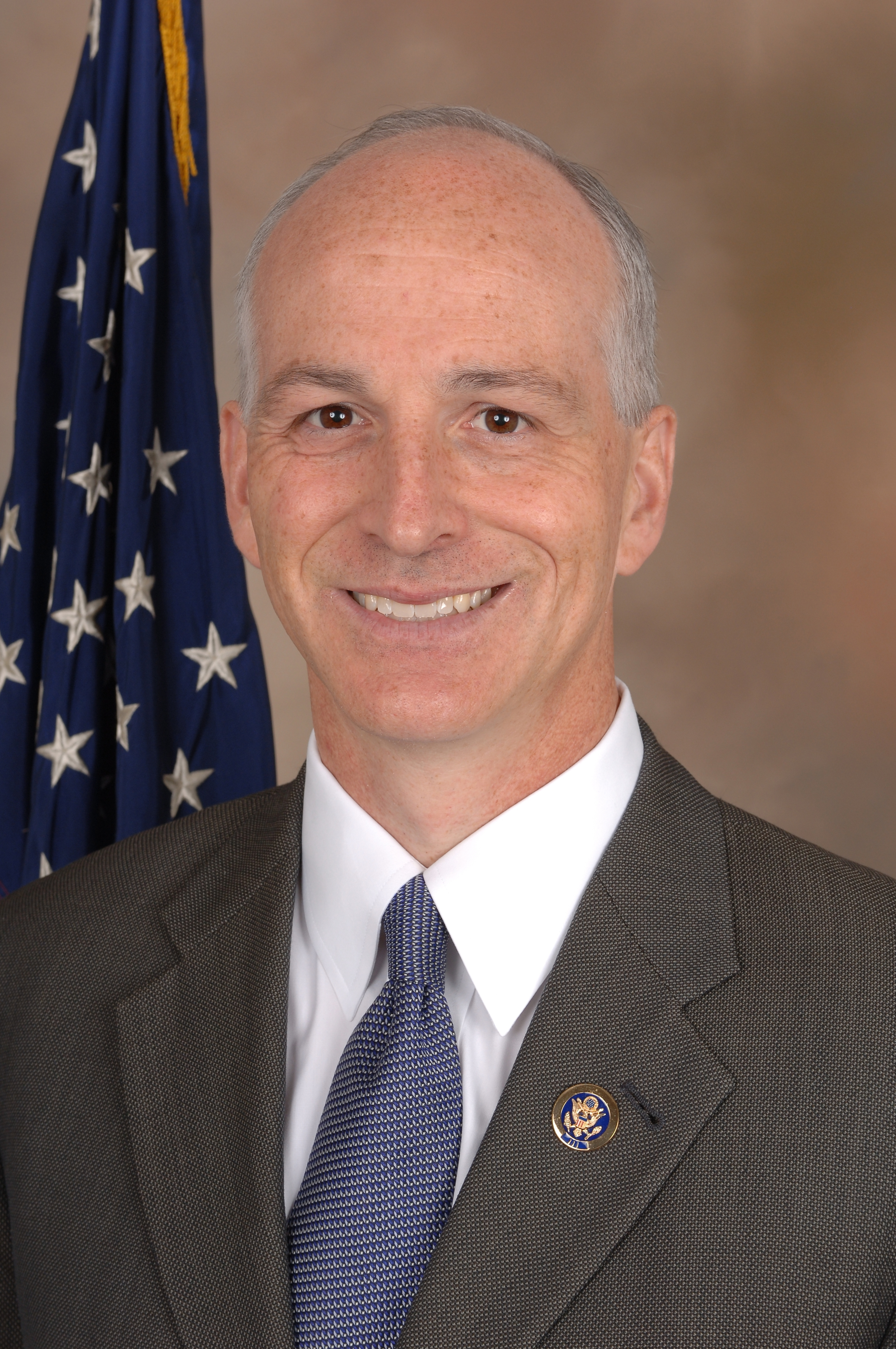
- Official portrait, 2009

Ranking Member of the House Armed Services Committee
- Incumbent
- Assumed office January 3, 2023
- Preceded by: Mike Rogers
- In office January 3, 2011 – January 3, 2019
- Preceded by: Buck McKeon
- Succeeded by: Mac Thornberry

Chair of the House Armed Services Committee
- In office January 3, 2019 – January 3, 2023
- Preceded by: Mac Thornberry
- Succeeded by: Mike Rogers

Member of the U.S. House of Representatives from Washington's 9th district
- Incumbent
- Assumed office January 3, 1997
- Preceded by: Randy Tate

Member of the Washington State Senate from the 33rd district
- In office January 14, 1991 – January 3, 1997
- Preceded by: Eleanor Lee
- Succeeded by: Julia Patterson

Personal details
- Born: David Adam Smith; June 15, 1965 (age 61) Washington, D.C., U.S.
- Party: Democratic
- Spouse: Sara Bickle-Eldridge (m. 1993)
- Children: 2
- Education: Western Washington University (attended); Fordham University (BA); University of Washington (JD)
- Website: House website Campaign website
- Smith's voice Smith opening a House Armed Services Committee hearing on the FY2022 Defense Department budget request. Recorded June 23, 2021

David Adam Smith (born June 15, 1965) is an American politician and attorney serving as the U.S. representative for Washington's 9th congressional district since 1997. A member of the Democratic Party, Smith previously served in the Washington State Senate.

A graduate of the University of Washington School of Law, Smith briefly worked as a prosecutor and pro tem judge for the city of Seattle before entering politics. Smith was elected to the State Senate in 1990; at age 25, he was the youngest state senator in the country. He ran in and won his first congressional race in 1996, and has been reelected 14 times. From 2019 through 2022, he chaired the House Armed Services Committee, and is currently the Ranking Member. Smith is a member of the New Democrat Coalition and the Congressional Progressive Caucus. He is the dean of Washington's House delegation.

== Early life and education ==
Born in Washington, D.C., and raised in SeaTac, Washington, Smith was adopted as an infant by Leila June (née Grant) and his maternal uncle Ben Martin Smith III. He attended Bow Lake Elementary and Chinook Middle School before graduating from Tyee High School in 1983. In high school, Smith participated in the Close Up Washington civic education program. His father, who worked for United Airlines as a ramp serviceman and was active in the Machinists' Union, died when Smith was 19.

Smith attended Western Washington University in Bellingham for a year before graduating from Fordham University in 1987 with a Bachelor of Arts degree in political science. He received a Juris Doctor from the University of Washington in 1990. He worked his way through college by loading trucks for United Parcel Service.

== Early career ==
After law school, Smith worked as a private practice attorney with Cromwell, Mendoza & Belur. From 1993 to 1995, he served as a prosecutor for Seattle. In 1996, he worked temporarily as a pro tem judge.

Smith served in the Washington State Senate from 1991 to 1997. He was 25 years old at the time of his election in 1990, defeating a 13-year incumbent Republican, Eleanor Lee, to become the nation's youngest state senator.

== U.S. House of Representatives ==
=== Elections ===
==== 1996 ====
Smith won his seat in the U.S. House of Representatives in 1996 by defeating another incumbent Republican, Rep. Randy Tate, with 50.4 percent of the vote. He has never faced another contest nearly that close.

==== 2008 ====
In 2008, Smith won a seventh term in the House, defeating James Postma, a 74-year-old retired engineer running on a pro-nuclear power platform, with 65% of the vote.

==== 2012 ====
For his first seven terms, Smith represented a district that straddled Interstate 5, from Renton through Tacoma to just outside of Olympia. Smith's district was significantly redrawn after the 2010 census. It absorbed much of southeast Seattle as well as most of the Eastside. As a result, it became the state's first with a majority of residents who are racial or ethnic minorities. It is also the state's second-most Democratic district; only the neighboring 7th district, which covers the rest of Seattle, is more Democratic.

Smith was reelected for a ninth term.

==== 2022 ====
Smith ran for a fourteenth term and defeated Republican Doug Basler in the general election for the fourth time, winning 71.6% of the vote.

==== 2024 ====
Smith ran for a fifteenth term and defeated Democrat Melissa Chaudhry in the general election, winning 65.4% of the vote.

=== Tenure ===
Smith has been a long-time member in moderate "New Democrats" organizations and once chaired its political action committee.

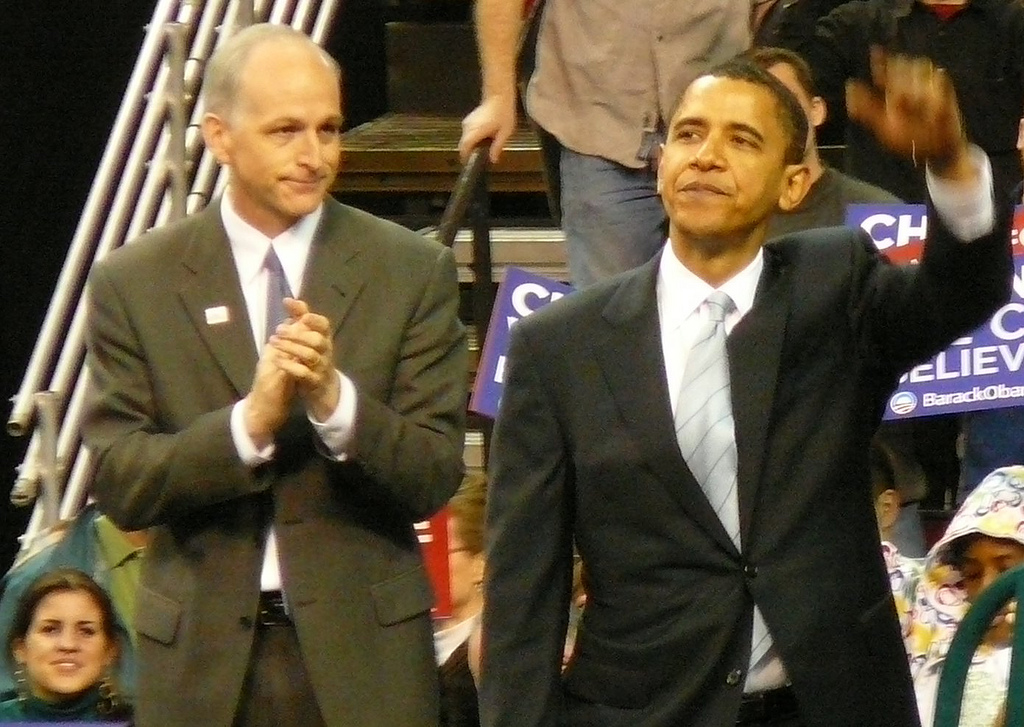
Adam Smith and Barack Obama at a campaign rally at Seattle's KeyArena, February 8, 2008.

In April 2007, Smith supported Barack Obama in the 2008 U.S. presidential election. He also appeared on Hardball with Chris Matthews speaking for Obama. The same year, he also appeared on The Colbert Report, in the show's 434-part series known as "Better Know A District".

On July 8, 2024, Smith called for Joe Biden to withdraw from the 2024 United States presidential election. Smith voted with President Joe Biden's stated position 100% of the time in the 117th Congress, according to a FiveThirtyEight analysis.

==== Foreign affairs ====
On October 10, 2002, Smith was among the 81 Democratic members of the House to vote to authorize the invasion of Iraq. In March 2012, he said that U.S. troops had done "amazing work" in Afghanistan and that it was "time to bring the troops home".

Smith voted against the Protect America Act of 2007, which has been criticized for violating Americans' civil liberties by allowing wiretapping without issued warrants. But in 2008, he voted for a similar bill, the FISA Amendment Act of 2008 (FAA), reauthorizing many of the provisions in the expired Protect America Act, leading critics like the ACLU to call it "an unconstitutional bill that would significantly modify the Foreign Intelligence Surveillance Act", granting expansive new monitoring powers to the executive branch with very little court oversight. The FAA also ensured the dismissal of all pending cases against telecommunication companies for their previous illegal spying on American citizens on behalf of the Executive Branch. Smith also voted for the 2001 Patriot Act and to extend the Bush administration's warrantless wiretapping program.

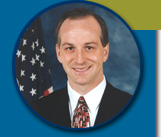
Smith as a representative during the 109th Congress

On December 16, 2010, Smith defeated Silvestre Reyes and Loretta Sanchez to become the Ranking Member of the House Armed Services Committee after Chairman Ike Skelton was defeated for reelection. In the first round, Sanchez and Smith earned 64 votes, and Reyes earned 53. In the runoff, Smith defeated Sanchez by 11 votes.

In 2011, recognized for his work in fighting global poverty, Smith became only the second member of Congress selected for the Borgen Project's board of directors. The same year, he argued against cuts that could "jeopardize our national security" and leave the U.S. "more vulnerable to nuclear terrorism".

In 2001, Congress passed the Authorization for Use of Military Force (AUMF), which gave the president authority to use "all necessary and appropriate force" against those who committed and aided the September 11 attacks. While this power has been rarely used to detain persons in the U.S., Smith introduced a bill to ensure that anyone detained on U.S. soil under the AUMF has access to due process and the federal court system. The bill also prohibits military commissions and indefinite detention for people detained in the U.S. and would ensure the detainees constitutional rights.

Smith and Representative Mac Thornberry co-sponsored an amendment to the fiscal 2013 defense spending bill reversing previous bans on disseminating Defense and State Department propaganda in the U.S., reversing the Smith–Mundt Act of 1948 and the Foreign Relations Authorization Act of 1987, designed to protect U.S. audiences from government misinformation campaigns. The bill passed on May 18, 2012, 299 to 120.

Smith, concerned about the 2021 withdrawal from Afghanistan, tried to contact Joe Biden in advance, without success; however, he did get a call from Biden after he criticized the Afghanistan withdrawal—the only one he got from Biden in four years.

In November of 2023, Representative Smith's house was vandalized with spray paint by individuals advocating for cease fire in Israel and Gaza.

Smith has advocated for a nuanced policy towards China, calling to view the country not as an existential threat to be defeated but a competitor to be managed. In March 2025, he said "China is going to exist. We’re going to exist... So we need to build a frame for this world, not a frame for the 1950s, not a frame for the 1990s". In September 2025, a bipartisan delegation led by Smith visited China and met with Chinese Premier Li Qiang on September 21. They also met Foreign Minister Wang Yi, Defense Minister Dong Jun and other high-ranking Chinese officials. This marked the first visit to China by a U.S. House of Representatives delegation since 2019.

In July 2026, Smith stated that constituent feedback had turned him against US support for Israeli war efforts, and voted in favor of an Amendment that would prohibit sending military funds to Israel for the next fiscal year. Smith stated that he is a supporter of Israel, but stated Israel has "not offered any plausible future for the Palestinian people", which he views as a problem.

==== Domestic affairs ====
In December 2023, Smith introduced the End Hedge Fund Control of American Homes Act of 2023 to the House. This legislation would require hedge funds to sell at least 10% of the single-family homes they own yearly over 10 years. After this period, hedge funds will be banned from owning single-family homes.

==== Key votes ====
- Smith voted to approve the invasion of Iraq.
- Smith voted to approve the Cyber Intelligence Sharing and Protection Act (CISPA)
- Smith co-sponsored the Smith–Mundt Modernization Act of 2012, which allowed domestic dissemination of U.S. public diplomacy information.
- Smith voted against an amendment restricting the National Security Agency from collecting phone records of Americans suspected of no crimes without a warrant.

=== Committee assignments ===
- Committee on Armed Services (Ranking Member)

=== Caucus memberships ===
- 21st Century Healthcare Caucus
- American Sikh Congressional Caucus
- Black Maternal Health Caucus
- European Union Caucus
- Goods Movement Caucus
- Intellectual Property Caucus (Co-chair)
- United States Congressional International Conservation Caucus
- Waterways Caucus
- New Democrat Coalition
- Congressional Progressive Caucus
- Congressional Arts Caucus
- Congressional Equality Caucus
- Afterschool Caucuses
- Congressional Asian Pacific American Caucus
- Congressional Motorcycle Caucus
- Congressional Wildlife Refuge Caucus
- U.S.-Japan Caucus
- Medicare for All Caucus
- Congressional Coalition on Adoption (co-chair)
- Rare Disease Caucus
- Congressional Caucus on Turkey and Turkish Americans
- Congressional Taiwan Caucus

== Electoral history ==
=== Washington State Senate ===
Washington's 33rd senate district results, 1990
Party	Candidate	Votes	%
Democratic	Adam Smith	12,643	51.68
Republican	Eleanor Lee (incumbent)	11,819	48.32
Total votes		24,462	100
Democratic gain from Republican			

Washington's 33rd senate district results, 1994
Party	Candidate	Votes	%
Democratic	Adam Smith (incumbent)	15,320	52.14
Republican	Jerry Guite	14,060	47.86
Total votes		29,380	100
Democratic hold			

=== U.S. House of Representatives ===
Washington's 9th congressional district results, 1996
Party	Candidate	Votes	%
Democratic	Adam Smith	105,236	50.14
Republican	Randy Tate (incumbent)	99,199	47.27
Natural Law	David Gruenstein	5,432	2.59
Total votes		209,867	100
Democratic gain from Republican			

Washington's 9th congressional district results, 1998
Party	Candidate	Votes	%
Democratic	Adam Smith (incumbent)	111,948	64.69
Republican	Ron Taber	61,108	35.31
Total votes		173,056	100
Democratic hold			

Washington's 9th congressional district results, 2000
Party	Candidate	Votes	%
Democratic	Adam Smith (incumbent)	135,452	61.67
Republican	Chris Vance	76,766	34.95
Libertarian	Jonathan Wright	7,405	3.37
Total votes		219,623	100
Democratic hold			

Washington's 9th congressional district results, 2002
Party	Candidate	Votes	%
Democratic	Adam Smith (incumbent)	95,805	58.52
Republican	Sarah Casada	63,146	38.57
Libertarian	John Mills	4,759	2.91
Total votes		163,710	100
Democratic hold			

Washington's 9th congressional district results, 2004
Party	Candidate	Votes	%
Democratic	Adam Smith (incumbent)	162,433	63.28
Republican	Paul Lord	88,304	34.40
Green	Robert Losey	5,934	2.31
Total votes		256,671	100
Democratic hold			

Washington's 9th congressional district results, 2006
Party	Candidate	Votes	%
Democratic	Adam Smith (incumbent)	119,038	65.72
Republican	Steven Cofchin	62,082	34.28
Total votes		181,120	100
Democratic hold			

Washington's 9th congressional district results, 2008
Party	Candidate	Votes	%
Democratic	Adam Smith (incumbent)	176,295	65.45
Republican	Jim Postma	93,080	34.55
Total votes		269,375	100
Democratic hold			

Washington's 9th congressional district results, 2010
Primary election
Party	Candidate	Votes	%
Democratic	Adam Smith (incumbent)	63,866	51.24
Republican	Dick Muri	32,116	25.76
Republican	Jim Postma	24,509	19.66
Green	Roy Olson	4,159	3.34
Total votes		124,650	100
General election
Democratic	Adam Smith (incumbent)	123,743	54.85
Republican	Dick Muri	101,851	45.15
Total votes		225,594	100
Democratic hold			

Washington's 9th congressional district results, 2012
Primary election
Party	Candidate	Votes	%
Democratic	Adam Smith (incumbent)	72,868	61.16
Republican	Jim Postma	27,616	23.18
Democratic	Tom Cramer	8,376	7.03
Republican	John Orlinski	6,624	5.56
Democratic	Dave Christie	3,659	3.07
Total votes		119,143	100
General election
Democratic	Adam Smith (incumbent)	192,034	71.62
Republican	Jim Postma	76,105	28.38
Total votes		268,139	100
Democratic hold			

Washington's 9th congressional district results, 2014
Primary election
Party	Candidate	Votes	%
Democratic	Adam Smith (incumbent)	59,489	64.00
Republican	Doug Basler	25,290	27.21
Democratic	Don Rivers	5,434	5.85
Independent	Mark Greene	2,737	2.94
Total votes		92,950	100
General election
Democratic	Adam Smith (incumbent)	118,132	70.83
Republican	Doug Basler	48,662	29.17
Total votes		166,794	100
Democratic hold			

Washington's 9th congressional district results, 2016
Primary election
Party	Candidate	Votes	%
Democratic	Adam Smith (incumbent)	67,100	56.28
Republican	Doug Basler	27,848	23.36
Democratic	Jesse Wineberry	17,613	14.77
Democratic	Daniel Smith	3,935	3.30
Independent	Jeary Flener	2,733	2.29
Total votes		119,229	100
General election
Democratic	Adam Smith (incumbent)	205,165	72.89
Republican	Doug Basler	76,317	27.11
Total votes		281,482	100
Democratic hold			

Washington's 9th congressional district results, 2018
Primary election
Party	Candidate	Votes	%
Democratic	Adam Smith (incumbent)	71,035	48.42
Democratic	Sarah Smith	39,409	26.86
Republican	Doug Basler	36,254	24.71
Total votes		146,698	100
General election
Democratic	Adam Smith (incumbent)	163,345	67.90
Democratic	Sarah Smith	77,222	32.10
Total votes		240,567	100
Democratic hold			

Washington's 9th congressional district results, 2020
Primary election
Party	Candidate	Votes	%
Democratic	Adam Smith (incumbent)	145,601	73.59
Republican	Doug Basler	30,923	15.63
Republican	Joshua Campbell	15,983	8.08
Libertarian	Jorge Besada	4,792	2.42
Write-in		560	0.28
Total votes		197,859	100
General election
Democratic	Adam Smith (incumbent)	258,771	74.14
Republican	Doug Basler	89,697	25.70
Write-in		582	0.17
Total votes		349,050	100
Democratic hold			

Washington's 9th congressional district results, 2022
Primary election
Party	Candidate	Votes	%
Democratic	Adam Smith (incumbent)	78,272	55.27
Republican	Doug Basler	29,144	20.58
Democratic	Stephanie Gallardo	22,531	15.91
Republican	Sea Chan	5,338	3.77
Republican	Seth Pedersen	4,781	3.38
Independent	David Anderson	1,541	1.09
Total votes		141,607	100
General election
Democratic	Adam Smith (incumbent)	171,746	71.61
Republican	Doug Basler	67,631	28.20
Write-in		471	0.20
Total votes		239,848	100
Democratic hold			

Washington's 9th congressional district results, 2024
Primary election
Party	Candidate	Votes	%
Democratic	Adam Smith (incumbent)	78,761	53.83
Democratic	Melissa Chaudhry	30,229	20.66
Republican	Paul Martin	26,646	18.21
Republican	Mark Greene	9,459	6.47
Independent	David Ishii	963	0.66
Write-in		248	0.17
Total votes		146,306	100
General election
Democratic	Adam Smith (incumbent)	182,780	65.44
Democratic	Melissa Chaudhry	90,601	32.44
Write-in		5,917	2.12
Total votes		279,298	100
Democratic hold			

Washington's 9th congressional district results, 2026
Primary election
Party	Candidate	Votes	%
Democratic	Adam Smith (incumbent)	67,095	47.13
Republican	Doug Basler	31,070	21.83
Independent	Kshama Sawant	24,583	17.27
Democratic	Melissa Chaudhry	17,811	12.51
Socialist Workers	Jacob Perasso	1,588	1.12
Write-in		209	0.15
Total votes		142,356	100

== Personal life ==
In 1993, Smith married Spokane native Sara Bickle-Eldridge, a graduate of the University of Washington and Seattle University School of Law. Their daughter was born in July 2000, followed by their son in June 2003. He is an Episcopalian.

Smith has talked openly about his struggles with anxiety, depression, and chronic pain. He wrote about it at length in his 2023 memoir Lost and Broken: My Journey Back from Chronic Pain and Crippling Anxiety.

== See also ==
- 2006 United States House of Representatives elections in Washington

== Sources ==
- The Almanac of American Politics 2004. Washington, D.C.: National Journal, 2003.
- Pierce County Official Local Voters' Pamphlet (Pierce County Auditor, 2012).

U.S. House of Representatives
Preceded by Randy Tate	Member of the U.S. House of Representatives from Washington's 9th congressional district 1997–present	Incumbent
Preceded by Buck McKeon	Ranking Member of the House Armed Services Committee; 2011–2019	Succeeded by Mac Thornberry
Preceded by Mac Thornberry	Chair of the House Armed Services Committee; 2019–2023	Succeeded by Mike Rogers
Preceded by Mike Rogers	Ranking Member of the House Armed Services Committee; 2023–present	Incumbent
Party political offices
Preceded by Cal Dooley; Jim Moran; Tim Roemer	Chair of the New Democrat Coalition; 2001–2005; Served alongside: Jim Davis, Ron Kind	Succeeded by Artur Davis; Ron Kind; Ellen Tauscher
U.S. order of precedence (ceremonial)
Preceded by Brad Sherman	United States representatives by seniority 25th	Succeeded by Gregory Meeks
Preceded by Diana DeGette	Order of precedence of the United States	Succeeded by Gregory Meeks
