= Washington's 9th congressional district =

U.S. House district for Washington

Coordinates: 47°10′N 122°18′W

- Interactive map of district boundaries since January 3, 2023
- Representative: Adam Smith; D–Bellevue
- Population (2025): 781,619
- Median household income: $105,300
- Ethnicity: 40.6% White; 23.6% Asian; 14.3% Hispanic; 12.0% Black; 6.7% Two or more races; 1.8% Pacific Islander Americans; 1.1% other
- Cook PVI: D+22

Washington's 9th congressional district encompasses a long, somewhat narrow area in Western Washington, through the densely populated central Puget Sound region, from Auburn and Federal Way in the south to parts of Seattle and Bellevue in the north. Since 1997, the 9th district has been represented in the U.S. House of Representatives by Adam Smith, a Democrat from Bellevue.

Established after the 1990 U.S. census, the 9th district was originally drawn as a "fair fight" district. The first representative from the 9th district, Mike Kreidler (D), was defeated after one term by Republican Randy Tate; Tate, in turn, was defeated after one term by Smith. Since being first elected in 1996, Smith's moderate voting record and a strong Democratic trend in the Puget Sound region turned the formerly contentious district into a fairly safe Democratic seat.

Barack Obama swept the district in 2008 and 2012, with 67% and 69% of the vote, respectively. Hillary Clinton won the district with 69% in 2016, Joe Biden received 71% in the district in 2020, and Kamala Harris received 68% here in 2024.

In 2011, the state began the process of redistricting in response to population changes determined by the 2010 census. In the final report by the bipartisan redistricting commission issued in January 2012, the 9th district shifted to the north. The new district covered Bellevue, Southeast Seattle, and Mercer Island, but only went as far south as the southern tip of Commencement Bay in Tacoma. As of 2022 redistricting, it is a majority-minority district and the second-most Democratic district in the state; only the neighboring 7th district, covering the rest of Seattle, is more Democratic.

== Recent election results from statewide races ==
Year	Office	Results
2008	President	Obama 67% - 31%
2010	Senate	Murray 62% - 38%
2012	President	Obama 69% - 31%
2016	President	Clinton 69% - 25%
2016	Senate	Murray 71% - 29%
2016	Governor	Inslee 66% - 34%
2016	Lt. Governor	Habib 67% - 33%
2016	Secretary of State	Podlodowski 57% - 43%
2016	Auditor	McCarthy 62% - 38%
2018	Senate	Cantwell 71% - 29%
2020	President	Biden 71% - 26%
2020	Governor	Inslee 71% - 29%
2020	Secretary of State	Tarleton 57% - 43%
2020	Treasurer	Pellicciotti 66% - 34%
2020	Auditor	McCarthy 71% - 29%
2020	Attorney General	Ferguson 69% - 31%
2022	Senate	Murray 71% - 29%
2022	Secretary of State (Spec.)	Hobbs 62% - 35%
2024	President	Harris 68% - 27%
2024	Senate	Cantwell 71% - 28%
2024	Governor	Ferguson 67% - 33%
2024	Lt. Governor	Heck 68% - 32%
2024	Secretary of State	Hobbs 71% - 29%
2024	Treasurer	Pellicciotti 69% - 31%
2024	Auditor	McCarthy 70% - 30%
2024	Attorney General	Brown 67% - 33%
2024	Commissioner of Public Lands	Upthegrove 65% - 35%

== Composition ==
For the 118th and successive Congresses (based on redistricting following the 2020 census), the district contains all or portions of the following counties and communities:

King County (20)

Algona, Auburn (part; also 8th and 10th; shared with Pierce County), Beaux Arts Village, Bellevue (part; also 1st), Bryn Mawr-Skyway, Des Moines, East Renton Highlands (part; also 8th), Fairwood (part; also 8th), Federal Way, Kent (part; also 8th), Lakeland North, Lakeland South, Mercer Island, Milton (part; also 6th; shared with Pierce County), Newcastle, Pacific (part; also 10th; shared with Pierce County), Renton (part; also 8th), SeaTac, Seattle (part; also 7th), Tukwila

== List of members representing the district ==
Member (District home)	Party	Term	Cong ress	Electoral history	District location
District established January 3, 1993
Mike Kreidler (Olympia)	Democratic	January 3, 1993 – January 3, 1995	103rd	Elected in 1992. Lost re-election.	1993–2003; Parts of King, Pierce, and Thurston
Randy Tate (Puyallup)	Republican	January 3, 1995 – January 3, 1997	104th	Elected in 1994. Lost re-election.	1993–2003; Parts of King, Pierce, and Thurston
Adam Smith (Bellevue)	Democratic	January 3, 1997 – present	105th 106th 107th 108th 109th 110th 111th 112th 113th 114th 115th 116th 117th 118th 119th	Elected in 1996. Re-elected in 1998. Re-elected in 2000. Re-elected in 2002. Re-elected in 2004. Re-elected in 2006. Re-elected in 2008. Re-elected in 2010. Re-elected in 2012. Re-elected in 2014. Re-elected in 2016. Re-elected in 2018. Re-elected in 2020. Re-elected in 2022. Re-elected in 2024. Re-elected in 2026.	1993–2003; Parts of King, Pierce, and Thurston
Adam Smith (Bellevue)	Democratic	January 3, 1997 – present	105th 106th 107th 108th 109th 110th 111th 112th 113th 114th 115th 116th 117th 118th 119th	Elected in 1996. Re-elected in 1998. Re-elected in 2000. Re-elected in 2002. Re-elected in 2004. Re-elected in 2006. Re-elected in 2008. Re-elected in 2010. Re-elected in 2012. Re-elected in 2014. Re-elected in 2016. Re-elected in 2018. Re-elected in 2020. Re-elected in 2022. Re-elected in 2024. Re-elected in 2026.	2003–2013 Parts of King, Pierce, and Thurston
Adam Smith (Bellevue)	Democratic	January 3, 1997 – present	105th 106th 107th 108th 109th 110th 111th 112th 113th 114th 115th 116th 117th 118th 119th	Elected in 1996. Re-elected in 1998. Re-elected in 2000. Re-elected in 2002. Re-elected in 2004. Re-elected in 2006. Re-elected in 2008. Re-elected in 2010. Re-elected in 2012. Re-elected in 2014. Re-elected in 2016. Re-elected in 2018. Re-elected in 2020. Re-elected in 2022. Re-elected in 2024. Re-elected in 2026.	2013–2023 Parts of King and Pierce
Adam Smith (Bellevue)	Democratic	January 3, 1997 – present	105th 106th 107th 108th 109th 110th 111th 112th 113th 114th 115th 116th 117th 118th 119th	Elected in 1996. Re-elected in 1998. Re-elected in 2000. Re-elected in 2002. Re-elected in 2004. Re-elected in 2006. Re-elected in 2008. Re-elected in 2010. Re-elected in 2012. Re-elected in 2014. Re-elected in 2016. Re-elected in 2018. Re-elected in 2020. Re-elected in 2022. Re-elected in 2024. Re-elected in 2026.	2023–present Parts of King

== Recent election results ==
=== 2012 ===
Washington's 9th Congressional District, 2012
Party	Candidate	Votes	%
Democratic	Adam Smith (Incumbent)	192,034	71.6
Republican	Jim Postma	76,105	28.4
Total votes		268,139	100.0

=== 2014 ===
Washington's 9th congressional district, 2014
Party	Candidate	Votes	%
Democratic	Adam Smith (incumbent)	118,132	70.8
Republican	Doug Basler	48,662	29.2
Total votes		166,794	100.0
Democratic hold			

=== 2016 ===
Washington's 9th congressional district, 2016
Party	Candidate	Votes	%
Democratic	Adam Smith (incumbent)	205,165	72.9
Republican	Doug Basler	76,317	27.1
Total votes		281,482	100.0
Democratic hold			

=== 2018 ===
Washington's 9th congressional district, 2018
Party	Candidate	Votes	%
Democratic	Adam Smith (incumbent)	163,345	67.9
Democratic	Sarah Smith	77,222	32.1
Total votes		240,567	100.0
Democratic hold			

=== 2020 ===
Washington's 9th congressional district, 2020
Party	Candidate	Votes	%
Democratic	Adam Smith (incumbent)	258,771	74.1
Republican	Doug Basler	89,697	25.7
Write-in		582	0.17
Total votes		349,050	100
Democratic hold			

=== 2022 ===
Washington's 9th congressional district, 2022
Party	Candidate	Votes	%
Democratic	Adam Smith (incumbent)	171,746	71.6
Republican	Doug Basler	67,631	28.2
Write-in		471	0.2
Total votes		239,848	100
Democratic hold			

=== 2024 ===
Washington's 9th congressional district, 2024
Party	Candidate	Votes	%
Democratic	Adam Smith (incumbent)	182,780	65.4
Democratic	Melissa Chaudhry	90,601	32.4
Write-in		5,917	2.1
Total votes		279,298	100
Democratic hold			

== Historical district boundaries ==
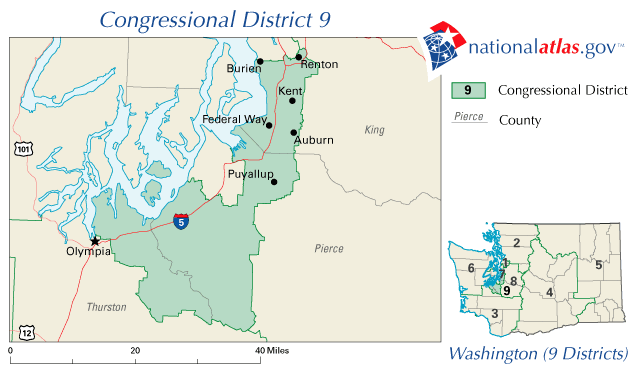
The district from 2003 to 2013

The district from 2013 to 2023

== See also ==
- 2008 United States House of Representatives elections in Washington
- 2010 United States House of Representatives elections in Washington
- 2012 United States House of Representatives elections in Washington
- 2014 United States House of Representatives elections in Washington
- 2016 United States House of Representatives elections in Washington
- 2018 United States House of Representatives elections in Washington
