= Washington State Office of the Insurance Commissioner =

Government agency in Washington State, USA

Office of the Insurance Commissioner
Division overview
- Jurisdiction: Washington
- Division executive: Patty Kuderer, Commissioner
- Website: www.insurance.wa.gov

The Washington State Office of the Insurance Commissioner was created in 1889–90, and became a separate agency in 1907 with an elected commissioner. The current commissioner is Patty Kuderer, a Democrat first elected in 2024 and assumed office in 2025.

In 2014, a bill was introduced to replace the elected commissioner with a 10-person board which would hire the commissioner. It was passed in both houses but vetoed by Governor Jay Inslee.

In 2015, the office denied applications by a number of association health plans, resulting in a legal dispute with those affected.

== Insurance commissioners ==
List of Washington State insurance commissioners
Name	Years	Party
J. H. Schively	1909–1913	Republican
H.O. Fishback	1913–1933	Republican
William A. Sullivan	1933–1961	Democratic
Lee I. Kueckelhan	1961–1969	Democratic
Karl Herrmann	1969–1977	Democratic
Richard G. Marquardt	1977–1993	Republican
Deborah Senn	1993–2001	Democratic
Mike Kreidler	2001–2025	Democratic
Patty Kuderer	2025–present	Democratic
