= 2020 United States House of Representatives elections in Washington =

- November 3, 2020

All 10 Washington seats to the United States House of Representatives
	Majority party	Minority party
Party	Democratic	Republican
Last election	7	3
Seats won	7	3
Seat change	Steady	Steady
Popular vote	2,340,356	1,545,436
Percentage	59.34%	39.18%
Swing	▼3.16%	▲4.48%

Democratic
50–60%
60–70%
70–80%
80–90%
Republican
50–60%
60–70%
70–80%
80–90%

The 2020 United States House of Representatives elections in Washington were held on November 3, 2020, to elect the 10 U.S. representatives from the state of Washington, one from each of the state's 10 congressional districts. The elections coincided with the 2020 U.S. presidential election, as well as other elections to the House of Representatives, elections to the United States Senate and various state and local elections.

== Overview ==
District	Democratic		Republican		Others		Total		Result
District	Votes	%	Votes	%	Votes	%	Votes	%	Result
District 1	249,944	58.55%	176,407	41.33%	511	0.12%	426,862	100.0%	Democratic hold
District 2	255,252	63.09%	148,384	36.67%	962	0.24%	404,598	100.0%	Democratic hold
District 3	181,347	43.39%	235,579	56.37%	977	0.23%	417,903	100.0%	Republican hold
District 4	102,667	33.63%	202,108	66.21%	488	0.16%	305,263	100.0%	Republican hold
District 5	155,737	38.51%	247,815	61.29%	808	0.20%	404,360	100.0%	Republican hold
District 6	247,429	59.30%	168,783	40.45%	1,004	0.24%	417,216	100.0%	Democratic hold
District 7	387,109	82.99%	78,240	16.77%	1,113	0.24%	466,462	100.0%	Democratic hold
District 8	213,123	51.71%	198,423	48.15%	566	0.14%	412,112	100.0%	Democratic hold
District 9	258,771	74.14%	89,697	25.70%	582	0.17%	349,050	100.0%	Democratic hold
District 10	288,977	84.89%	0	0.00%	51,430	15.11%	340,407	100.0%	Democratic hold
Total	2,340,356	59.34%	1,545,436	39.18%	58,441	1.48%	3,944,233	100.0%	

Popular vote
Democratic	59.34%
Republican	39.18%
Other	1.48%

House seats
Democratic	70.00%
Republican	30.00%

== District 1 ==
2020 Washington's 1st congressional district election
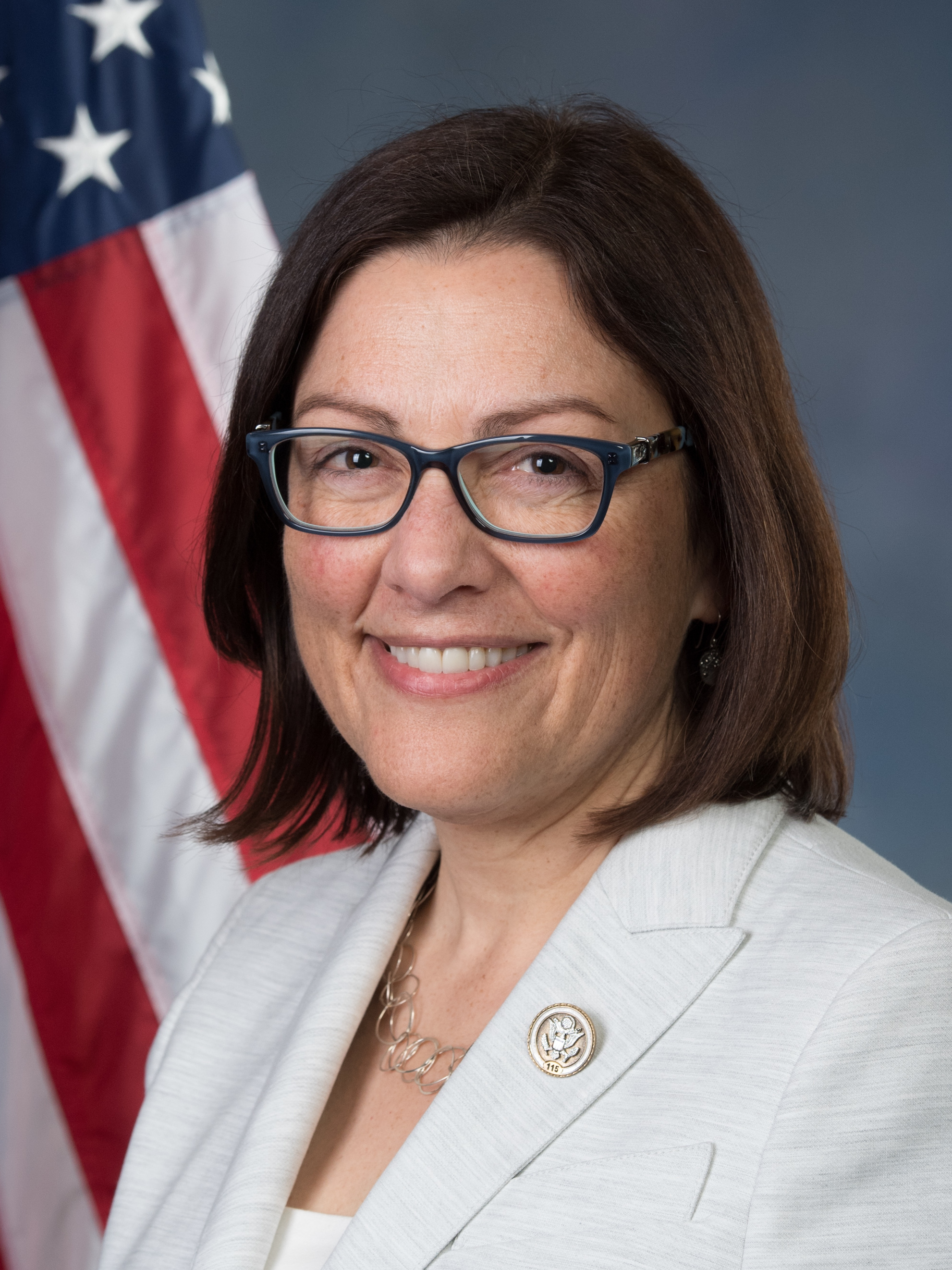

Candidate	Suzan DelBene	Jeffrey Beeler
Party	Democratic	Republican
Popular vote	249,944	176,407
Percentage	58.6%	41.3%
- DelBene: 50–60% 60–70% 70–80% 80–90% >90% Beeler: 40–50% 50–60% 60–70% 70–80% 80–90% >90% Tie: 40–50% 50% No data
U.S. Representative before election
Suzan DelBene
Democratic
Elected U.S. Representative
Suzan DelBene
Democratic

The 1st congressional district spans the northeastern Seattle suburbs, including Redmond and Kirkland, along the Cascades to the Canada–US border. The incumbent was Democrat Suzan DelBene, was re-elected with 59.3% of the vote in 2018.

=== Primary election ===
==== Candidates ====
===== Declared =====
- Jeffrey Beeler Sr. (Republican), Sultan city councilman and candidate for Washington's 1st congressional district in 2018
- Derek Chartrand (Republican), sales executive
- Suzan DelBene (Democratic), incumbent U.S. Representative
- Matthew Heines (independent), educator
- Robert Mair (independent), candidate for Washington's 1st congressional district in 2018
- Steve Skelton (Libertarian), office manager
- Justin Smoak (independent), mining engineer

==== Debate ====
2020 Washington's 1st congressional district primary debate
No.	Date	Host	Moderator	Link	Republican	Republican	Democratic	Independent	Independent	Libertarian	Independent
Key: P Participant A Absent N Not invited I Invited W Withdrawn											
Key: P Participant A Absent N Not invited I Invited W Withdrawn					Jeffrey Beller Sr.	Derek Chartrand	Suzan DelBene	Matthew Heines	Robert Mair	Steve Skelton	Justin Smoak
1	Jul. 22, 2020	League of Women Voters of Skagit County; League of Women Voters of Bellingham-Whatcom County	Janet Ott		P	P	P	P	N	P	P

==== Primary results ====
Results by county DelBene: 40–50% 50–60% 60–70%; Beeler: 40–50%

Nonpartisan blanket primary results
Party	Candidate	Votes	%
Democratic	Suzan DelBene (incumbent)	147,666	55.4
Republican	Jeffrey Beeler Sr.	85,655	32.1
Republican	Derek Chartrand	15,777	5.9
No party preference	Justin Smoak	7,701	2.9
Libertarian	Steven Skelton	7,286	2.7
No party preference	Matthew Heines	1,335	0.5
No party preference	Robert Dean Mair	812	0.3
Write-in		340	0.1
Total votes		266,572	100.0

=== General election ===
==== Predictions ====
Source	Ranking	As of
The Cook Political Report	Safe D	November 2, 2020
Inside Elections	Safe D	October 28, 2020
Sabato's Crystal Ball	Safe D	November 2, 2020
Politico	Safe D	November 2, 2020
Daily Kos	Safe D	November 2, 2020
RCP	Safe D	November 2, 2020

==== Results ====
Washington's 1st congressional district, 2020
Party	Candidate	Votes	%
Democratic	Suzan DelBene (incumbent)	249,944	58.6
Republican	Jeffrey Beeler	176,407	41.3
Write-in		511	0.1
Total votes		426,862	100.0
Democratic hold			

==== By county ====
County results
County	Suzan DelBene Democratic		Jeffrey Beeler Republican		Write-in Various		Margin		Total votes
County	#	%	#	%	#	%	#	%	Total votes
King (part)	115,662	70.00%	49,396	29.90%	163	0.10%	66,266	40.11%	165,221
Skagit (part)	14,316	51.99%	13,161	47.80%	57	0.21%	1,155	4.19%	27,534
Snohomish (part)	87,858	53.63%	75,742	46.23%	226	0.14%	12,116	7.40%	163,826
Whatcom (part)	32,108	45.69%	38,108	54.22%	65	0.09%	-6,000	-8.54%	70,281
Totals	249,944	58.55%	176,407	41.33%	511	0.12%	73,537	17.23%	426,862

== District 2 ==
2020 Washington's 2nd congressional district election
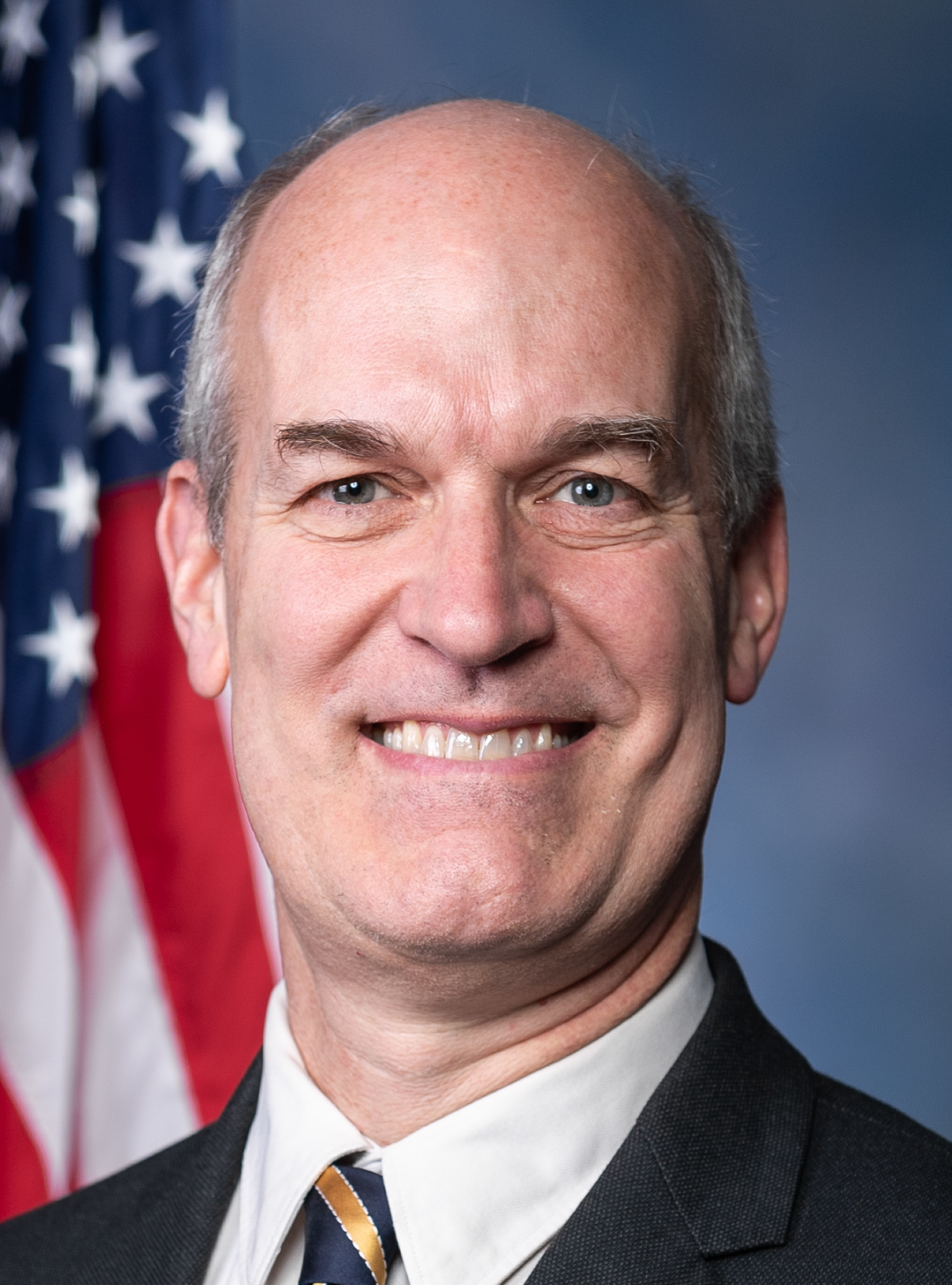

Candidate	Rick Larsen	Timothy Hazelo
Party	Democratic	Republican
Popular vote	255,252	148,384
Percentage	63.1%	36.7%
- Larsen: 40–50% 50–60% 60–70% 70–80% 80–90% >90% Hazelo: 40–50% 50–60% 60–70% 70–80% >90% Tie: 40–50% No data
U.S. Representative before election
Rick Larsen
Democratic
Elected U.S. Representative
Rick Larsen
Democratic

The 2nd congressional district encompasses the northern Puget Sound area, including Everett and Bellingham. The incumbent was Democrat Rick Larsen, who was re-elected with 71.3% of the vote in 2018.

=== Primary election ===
==== Candidates ====
===== Declared =====
- Jason Call (Democratic), progressive activist
- James Golder (Republican), former Idaho state representative (1977–1985)
- Cody Hart (Republican), U.S. Navy veteran
- Timothy Hazelo (Republican), U.S. Navy veteran
- Kari Ilonummi (Republican), blogger
- Carrie Kennedy (Republican), activist
- Rick Larsen (Democratic), incumbent U.S. Representative
- Tim Uy (Republican), volunteer firefighter

==== Endorsements ====
Rick Larsen (D)

Organizations

- League of Conservation Voters Action Fund
- Planned Parenthood Action Fund
- Sierra Club
Jason Call (D)

Organizations

- Democratic Socialists of America – Snohomish County chapter

==== Debate ====
2020 Washington's 2nd congressional district primary debate
No.	Date	Host	Moderator	Link	Democratic	Republican	Republican	Republican	Republican	Republican	Democratic	Republican
Key: P Participant A Absent N Not invited I Invited W Withdrawn												
Key: P Participant A Absent N Not invited I Invited W Withdrawn					Jason Call	James Golder	Cody Hart	Timothy Hazelo	Kari Ilonummi	Carrie Kennedy	Rick Larsen	Tim Uy
1	Jul. 22, 2020	League of Women Voters of Skagit County; League of Women Voters of Bellingham-Whatcom County	Julie Hubner		P	N	P	P	N	P	P	P

==== Primary results ====
Results by county Larsen: 40–50% 50–60%

Nonpartisan blanket primary results
Party	Candidate	Votes	%
Democratic	Rick Larsen (incumbent)	120,694	48.5
Republican	Timothy S. Hazelo	37,104	14.9
Democratic	Jason Call	34,537	13.9
Trump Republican	Tim Uy	24,613	9.9
Republican	Cody Hart	14,225	5.7
Republican	Carrie R. Kennedy	9,096	3.6
Republican	James Dean Golder	5,343	2.1
Republican	Kari Ilonummi	2,889	1.2
Write-in		284	0.1
Total votes		248,788	100.0

=== General election ===
==== Predictions ====
Source	Ranking	As of
The Cook Political Report	Safe D	November 2, 2020
Inside Elections	Safe D	October 28, 2020
Sabato's Crystal Ball	Safe D	November 2, 2020
Politico	Safe D	November 2, 2020
Daily Kos	Safe D	November 2, 2020
RCP	Safe D	November 2, 2020

==== Results ====
Washington's 2nd congressional district, 2020
Party	Candidate	Votes	%
Democratic	Rick Larsen (incumbent)	255,252	63.1
Republican	Timothy Hazelo	148,384	36.7
Write-in		962	0.2
Total votes		404,598	100.0
Democratic hold			

==== By county ====
County results
County	Rick Larsen Democratic		Timothy Hazelo Republican		Write-in Various		Margin		Total votes
County	#	%	#	%	#	%	#	%	Total votes
Island	29,131	55.41%	23,350	44.41%	92	0.17%	5,781	11.00%	52,573
San Juan	9,600	74.60%	3,226	25.07%	43	0.33%	6,374	49.53%	12,869
Skagit (part)	24,056	54.87%	19,690	44.91%	94	0.21%	4,366	9.96%	43,840
Snohomish (part)	141,440	61.55%	87,827	38.22%	538	0.23%	53,613	23.33%	229,805
Whatcom (part)	51,025	77.89%	14,291	21.81%	195	0.30%	36,734	56.07%	65,511
Totals	255,252	63.09%	148,384	36.67%	962	0.24%	106,868	26.41%	404,598

== District 3 ==
2020 Washington's 3rd congressional district election
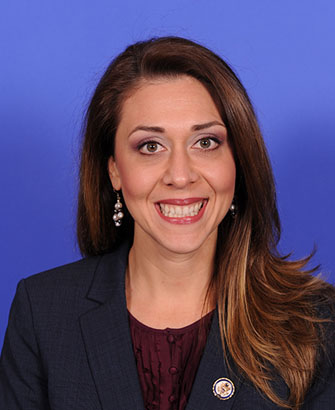

Candidate	Jaime Herrera Beutler	Carolyn Long
Party	Republican	Democratic
Popular vote	235,579	181,347
Percentage	56.4%	43.4%
- Beutler: 40–50% 50–60% 60–70% 70–80% 80–90% >90% Long: 40–50% 50–60% 60–70% 70–80% >90% Tie: 40–50% No data
U.S. Representative before election
Jaime Herrera Beutler
Republican
Elected U.S. Representative
Jaime Herrera Beutler
Republican

The 3rd district encompasses the southernmost portion of western and central Washington. It includes the counties of Lewis, Pacific, Wahkiakum, Cowlitz, Clark, Skamania, and Klickitat, as well as a small sliver of southern Thurston County. The incumbent was Republican Jaime Herrera Beutler, who was re-elected with 52.7% of the vote in 2018.

=== Primary election ===
==== Candidates ====
===== Declared =====
- Jaime Herrera Beutler (Republican), incumbent U.S. Representative
- Devin Gray (Democratic)
- Martin Hash (independent), businessman and Democratic candidate for Washington's 3rd congressional district in 2018
- Carolyn Long (Democratic), Washington State University Vancouver professor and nominee for Washington's 3rd congressional district in 2018
- Davy Ray (Democratic)

===== Withdrawn =====
- Peter Khalil (Democratic), legal mediator

==== Endorsements ====
Jaime Herrera Beutler (R)

Organizations

- Maggie's List
Peter Khalil (D)

Organizations

- Brand New Congress
Carolyn Long (D)

Organizations

- EMILY's List
- Human Rights Campaign
- League of Conservation Voters Action Fund
- NARAL Pro-Choice America
- Sierra Club

==== Primary results ====
Results by county Herrera Beutler: 50–60% 60–70% 70–80%

Nonpartisan blanket primary results
Party	Candidate	Votes	%
Republican	Jaime Herrera Beutler (incumbent)	135,726	56.2
Democratic	Carolyn Long	95,875	39.7
No party preference	Martin D. Hash	3,904	1.6
Democratic	Davy Ray	3,522	1.5
Democratic	Devin C. Gray	1,969	0.8
Write-in		343	0.1
Total votes		241,339	100.0

=== General election ===
==== Predictions ====
Source	Ranking	As of
The Cook Political Report	Lean R	November 2, 2020
Inside Elections	Lean R	October 28, 2020
Sabato's Crystal Ball	Lean R	November 2, 2020
Politico	Lean R	November 2, 2020
Daily Kos	Lean R	November 2, 2020
RCP	Lean R	November 2, 2020

==== Polling ====
Poll source	Date(s) administered	Sample size (Note: Key: A – all adults RV – registered voters LV – likely voters V – unclear)	Margin of error	Jaime Herrera Beutler (R)	Carolyn Long (D)	Undecided
DCCC Targeting & Analytics (D) (Note: The DCCC endorsed Long prior to the sampling period.)	October 19–20, 2020	425 (LV)	± 4.9%	49%	47%	4%
GQR Research (D) (Note: Poll conducted for the Long campaign.)	September 24–26, 2020	400 (LV)	± 4.9%	49%	47%	4%
RMG Research	July 20–August 4, 2020	500 (RV)	± 4.5%	44%	40%	16%

==== Results ====
Washington's 3rd congressional district, 2020
Party	Candidate	Votes	%
Republican	Jaime Herrera Beutler (incumbent)	235,579	56.4
Democratic	Carolyn Long	181,347	43.4
Write-in		977	0.2
Total votes		417,903	100.0
Republican hold			

==== By county ====
County results
County	Jaime Herrera Beutler Republican		Carolyn Long Democratic		Write-in Various		Margin		Total votes
County	#	%	#	%	#	%	#	%	Total votes
Clark	141,035	52.28%	128,050	47.47%	691	0.26%	12,985	4.81%	269,776
Cowlitz	37,130	62.58%	22,048	37.16%	151	0.25%	15,082	25.42%	59,329
Klickitat	7,800	58.98%	5,404	40.86%	21	0.16%	2,396	18.12%	13,225
Lewis	31,344	70.28%	13,202	29.60%	55	0.12%	18,142	40.68%	44,601
Pacific	7,476	54.27%	6,275	45.55%	25	0.18%	1,201	8.72%	13,776
Skamania	4,196	58.33%	2,985	41.49%	13	0.18%	1,211	16.83%	7,194
Thurston (part)	4,682	66.49%	2,340	33.23%	20	0.28%	2,342	33.26%	7,042
Wahkiakum	1,916	64.73%	1,043	35.24%	1	0.03%	873	29.49%	2,960
Totals	235,579	56.37%	181,347	43.39%	977	0.23%	54,232	12.98%	417,903

== District 4 ==
2020 Washington's 4th congressional district election

Candidate	Dan Newhouse	Douglas McKinley
Party	Republican	Democratic
Popular vote	202,108	102,667
Percentage	66.2%	33.6%
- Newhouse: 50–60% 60–70% 70–80% 80–90% >90% McKinley: 50–60% 60–70% 70–80% 80–90% Tie: 40–50% 50% No data
U.S. Representative before election
Dan Newhouse
Republican
Elected U.S. Representative
Dan Newhouse
Republican

The 4th congressional district encompasses rural central Washington, including Yakima and Tri-Cities area. The incumbent was Republican Dan Newhouse, was re-elected with 62.8% of the vote in 2018.

=== Primary election ===
==== Candidates ====
- Ryan Cooper (Libertarian), Libertarian candidate for Washington State Senate in 2018
- Evan Jones (independent), community activist
- Doug McKinley (Democratic), attorney
- Dan Newhouse (Republican), incumbent U.S. Representative
- Sarena Sloot (Republican), nurse practitioner
- Tracy Wright (Republican), computer programmer

==== Primary results ====
Results by county Newhouse: 50–60% 60–70%

Nonpartisan blanket primary results
Party	Candidate	Votes	%
Republican	Dan Newhouse (incumbent)	101,539	57.4
Democratic	Douglas E. McKinley	46,471	26.2
Republican	Sarena Sloot	11,823	6.7
Republican	Tracy Wright	9,088	5.1
Libertarian	Ryan Cooper	4,080	2.3
Independent	Evan Jones	3,816	2.2
Write-in		228	0.1
Total votes		177,045	100

=== General election ===
==== Predictions ====
Source	Ranking	As of
The Cook Political Report	Safe R	November 2, 2020
Inside Elections	Safe R	October 28, 2020
Sabato's Crystal Ball	Safe R	November 2, 2020
Politico	Safe R	November 2, 2020
Daily Kos	Safe R	November 2, 2020
RCP	Safe R	November 2, 2020

==== Results ====
Washington's 4th congressional district, 2020
Party	Candidate	Votes	%
Republican	Dan Newhouse (incumbent)	202,108	66.2
Democratic	Douglas McKinley	102,667	33.6
Write-in		488	0.2
Total votes		305,263	100.0
Republican hold			

==== By county ====
County results
County	Dan Newhouse Republican		Douglas McKinley Democratic		Write-in Various		Margin		Total votes
County	#	%	#	%	#	%	#	%	Total votes
Adams	4,265	74.03%	1,488	25.83%	8	0.14%	2,777	48.20%	5,761
Benton	68,743	67.79%	32,469	32.02%	197	0.19%	36,274	35.77%	101,409
Douglas (part)	8,326	70.10%	3,540	29.80%	12	0.10%	4,786	40.29%	11,878
Franklin	20,324	63.69%	11,551	36.20%	38	0.12%	8,773	27.49%	31,913
Grant	26,758	73.53%	9,582	26.33%	53	0.15%	17,176	47.20%	36,393
Okanogan	13,074	62.83%	7,707	37.04%	28	0.13%	5,367	25.79%	20,809
Walla Walla (part)	2,095	79.18%	549	20.75%	2	0.08%	1,546	58.43%	2,646
Yakima	58,523	61.96%	35,781	37.88%	150	0.16%	22,742	24.08%	94,454
Totals	202,108	66.21%	102,667	33.63%	488	0.16%	99,441	32.58%	305,263

== District 5 ==
2020 Washington's 5th congressional district election
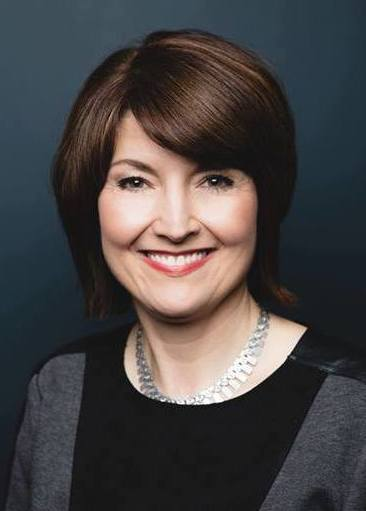

Candidate	Cathy McMorris Rodgers	Dave Wilson
Party	Republican	Democratic
Popular vote	247,815	155,737
Percentage	61.3%	38.5%
- Rodgers: 50–60% 60–70% 70–80% 80–90% >90% Wilson: 40–50% 50–60% 60–70% 70–80% 80–90% Tie: 40–50% 50% No data
U.S. Representative before election
Cathy McMorris Rodgers
Republican
Elected U.S. Representative
Cathy McMorris Rodgers
Republican

The 5th district encompasses eastern Washington, and includes the city of Spokane. The incumbent was Republican Cathy McMorris Rodgers, who was re-elected with 54.8% of the vote in 2018.

=== Primary election ===
==== Candidates ====
===== Declared =====
- Stephen Major (Republican), former mortgage broker
- Cathy McMorris Rodgers (Republican), incumbent U.S. Representative
- Brendan O'Regan (independent)
- Dave Wilson (Democratic), community activist

===== Withdrawn =====
- Chris Armitage (Democratic), comedian and U.S. Air Force veteran(remained on ballot)
- Rob Chase (Republican)

==== Endorsements ====
Chris Armitage (D)

U.S. representatives

- Ted Lieu, U.S. representative from California's 33rd congressional district

Organizations

- 90 for 90
- Brand New Congress
- Our Revolution – Inland Northwest chapter
- Spokane County Democrats
Cathy McMorris Rodgers (R)

Federal officials

- Donald Trump, President of the United States (2017-2021)

Organizations

- Maggie's List

==== Results ====
Results by county McMorris Rodgers: 40–50% 50–60% 60–70% 70–80%

Nonpartisan blanket primary results
Party	Candidate	Votes	%
Republican	Cathy McMorris Rodgers (incumbent)	122,744	52.7
Democratic	Dave Wilson	56,492	24.3
Democratic	Christopher Armitage (withdrawn)	28,180	12.1
Republican	Stephen T. Major	20,000	8.6
Independent	Brendan O'Regan	4,995	2.1
Write-in		385	0.2
Total votes		232,796	100.0

=== General election ===
==== Predictions ====
Source	Ranking	As of
The Cook Political Report	Safe R	November 2, 2020
Inside Elections	Safe R	October 28, 2020
Sabato's Crystal Ball	Safe R	November 2, 2020
Politico	Likely R	November 2, 2020
Daily Kos	Safe R	November 2, 2020
RCP	Safe R	November 2, 2020

==== Results ====
Washington's 5th congressional district, 2020
Party	Candidate	Votes	%
Republican	Cathy McMorris Rodgers (incumbent)	247,815	61.3
Democratic	Dave Wilson	155,737	38.5
Write-in		808	0.2
Total votes		404,360	100.0
Republican hold			

==== By county ====
County results
County	Cathy McMorris Rodgers Republican		Dave Wilson Democratic		Write-in Various		Margin		Total votes
County	#	%	#	%	#	%	#	%	Total votes
Asotin	8,195	69.64%	3,550	30.17%	23	0.20%	4,645	39.47%	11,768
Columbia	1,893	76.80%	565	22.92%	7	0.28%	1,328	53.87%	2,465
Ferry	2,966	69.41%	1,292	30.24%	15	0.35%	1,674	39.18%	4,273
Garfield	1,190	81.06%	275	18.73%	3	0.20%	915	62.33%	1,468
Lincoln	5,540	80.08%	1,326	19.69%	16	0.23%	4,178	60.39%	6,918
Pend Oreille	6,076	72.02%	2,343	27.77%	17	0.20%	3,733	44.25%	8,436
Spokane	172,838	59.14%	118,812	40.66%	593	0.20%	54,026	18.49%	292,243
Stevens	21,112	75.29%	6,860	24.46%	70	0.25%	14,252	50.82%	28,042
Walla Walla (part)	16,945	60.40%	11,069	39.46%	39	0.14%	5,876	20.95%	28,053
Whitman	11,060	53.45%	9,609	46.43%	25	0.12%	1,451	7.01%	20,694
Totals	247,815	61.29%	155,737	38.51%	808	0.20%	92,078	22.77%	404,360

== District 6 ==
2020 Washington's 6th congressional district election
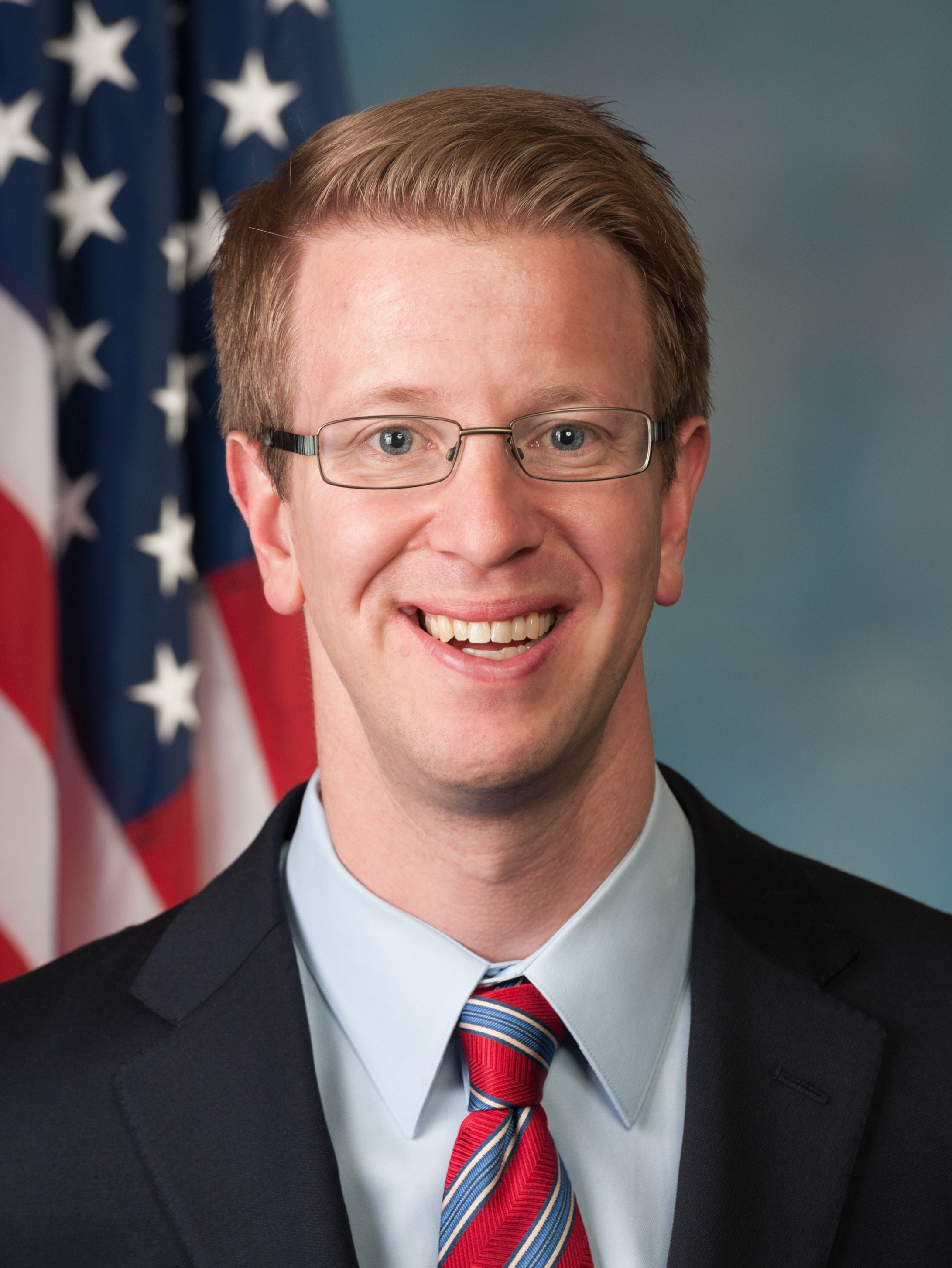

Candidate	Derek Kilmer	Elizabeth Kreiselmaier
Party	Democratic	Republican
Popular vote	247,429	168,783
Percentage	59.3%	40.5%
- Kilmer: 50–60% 60–70% 70–80% 80–90% >90% Kreiselmaier: 40–50% 50–60% 60–70% 70–80% Tie: 40–50% 50% No data
U.S. Representative before election
Derek Kilmer
Democratic
Elected U.S. Representative
Derek Kilmer
Democratic

The 6th district is based on the Olympic Peninsula, and includes western Tacoma. The incumbent was Democrat Derek Kilmer, who was re-elected with 63.9% of the vote in 2018.

=== Primary election ===
==== Candidates ====
===== Declared =====
- Johny Alberg (Republican)
- Stephen Brodhead (Republican), businessman
- Derek Kilmer (Democratic), incumbent U.S. Representative
- Elizabeth Kreiselmaier (Republican), psychologist
- Rebecca Parson (Democratic), Tacoma Area Commission on Disabilities commissioner
- Chris Welton (Republican), records technician

==== Withdrew ====
- Matthew Tirman (Democratic), Bainbridge Island city councilman

===== Endorsements =====
Derek Kilmer (D)

Organizations

- League of Conservation Voters Action Fund
- Planned Parenthood Action Fund
- Sierra Club
Rebecca Parson (D)

Organizations

- Democratic Socialists of America
- National Women's Political Caucus
- Our Revolution – national
- Our Revolution – Washington
- People's Policy Project

==== Results ====
Results by county Kilmer: 30–40% 40–50% 50–60%

Nonpartisan blanket primary results
Party	Candidate	Votes	%
Democratic	Derek Kilmer (incumbent)	125,019	47.3
Republican	Elizabeth Kreiselmaier	71,601	27.1
Democratic	Rebecca Parson	35,631	13.5
Republican	Chris Welton	14,795	5.6
Republican	Stephan Brodhead	9,761	3.7
Republican	Johny Alberg	7,178	2.7
Write-in		338	0.1
Total votes		264,323	100.0

=== General election ===
==== Predictions ====
Source	Ranking	As of
The Cook Political Report	Safe D	November 2, 2020
Inside Elections	Safe D	October 28, 2020
Sabato's Crystal Ball	Safe D	November 2, 2020
Politico	Safe D	November 2, 2020
Daily Kos	Safe D	November 2, 2020
RCP	Safe D	November 2, 2020

==== Results ====
Washington's 6th congressional district, 2020
Party	Candidate	Votes	%
Democratic	Derek Kilmer (incumbent)	247,429	59.3
Republican	Elizabeth Kreiselmaier	168,783	40.5
Write-in		1,004	0.2
Total votes		417,216	100.0
Democratic hold			

==== By county ====
County results
County	Derek Kilmer Democratic		Elizabeth Kreiselmaier Republican		Write-in Various		Margin		Total votes
County	#	%	#	%	#	%	#	%	Total votes
Clallam	25,424	52.89%	22,609	47.03%	38	0.08%	2,815	5.86%	48,071
Grays Harbor	18,327	49.01%	18,999	50.81%	65	0.17%	-672	-1.80%	37,391
Jefferson	17,096	70.14%	7,203	29.55%	75	0.31%	9,893	40.59%	24,374
Kitsap	91,800	59.38%	62,454	40.40%	354	0.23%	29,346	18.98%	154,608
Mason (part)	13,410	47.84%	14,565	51.96%	54	0.19%	-1,155	-4.12%	28,029
Pierce (part)	81,372	65.23%	42,953	34.43%	418	0.34%	38,419	30.80%	124,743
Totals	247,429	59.30%	168,783	40.45%	1,004	0.24%	78,646	18.85%	417,216

== District 7 ==
2020 Washington's 7th congressional district election
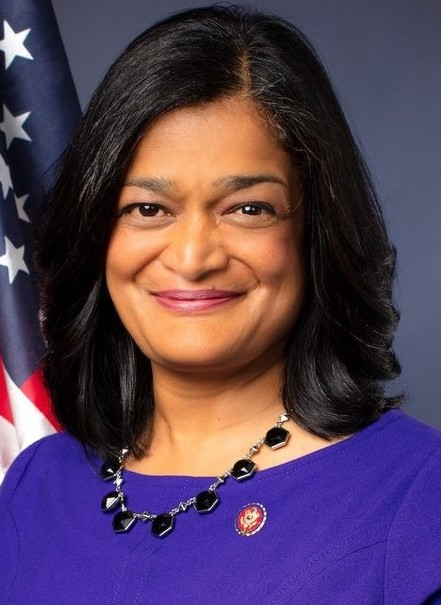

Candidate	Pramila Jayapal	Craig Keller
Party	Democratic	Republican
Popular vote	387,109	78,240
Percentage	83.0%	16.8%
- Jayapal: 50–60% 60–70% 70–80% 80–90% >90% Keller: 50–60% No data
U.S. Representative before election
Pramila Jayapal
Democratic
Elected U.S. Representative
Pramila Jayapal
Democratic

The 7th congressional district encompasses most of Seattle, as well Edmonds, Shoreline, Lake Forest Park, Vashon Island, and Burien. The incumbent was Democrat Pramila Jayapal, who was reelected with 83.6% of the vote in 2018.

=== Primary election ===
==== Candidates ====
===== Declared =====
- Jack Hughes-Hageman (Democratic)
- Pramila Jayapal (Democratic) incumbent U.S. Representative
- Craig Keller (Republican)
- Rick Lewis (independent)
- Scott Sutherland (Republican)

==== Primary results ====
Results by county Jayapal: 60–70% 80–90%

Nonpartisan blanket primary results
Party	Candidate	Votes	%
Democratic	Pramila Jayapal (incumbent)	240,801	80.0
Republican	Craig Keller	24,477	8.1
Independent	Rick Lewis	13,885	4.6
Republican	Scott Sutherland	11,332	3.8
Democratic	Jack Hughes-Hageman	10,052	3.3
Write-in		537	0.2
Total votes		301,084	100.0

=== General election ===
==== Predictions ====
Source	Ranking	As of
The Cook Political Report	Safe D	November 2, 2020
Inside Elections	Safe D	October 28, 2020
Sabato's Crystal Ball	Safe D	November 2, 2020
Politico	Safe D	November 2, 2020
Daily Kos	Safe D	November 2, 2020
RCP	Safe D	November 2, 2020

==== Results ====
Washington's 7th congressional district, 2020
Party	Candidate	Votes	%
Democratic	Pramila Jayapal (incumbent)	387,109	83.0
Republican	Craig Keller	78,240	16.8
Write-in		1,113	0.2
Total votes		466,462	100.0
Democratic hold			

==== By county ====
County results
County	Pramila Jayapal Democratic		Craig Keller Republican		Write-in Various		Margin		Total votes
County	#	%	#	%	#	%	#	%	Total votes
King (part)	366,096	84.15%	67,934	15.61%	1,037	0.24%	298,162	68.53%	435,067
Snohomish (part)	21,013	66.93%	10,306	32.83%	76	0.24%	10,707	34.10%	31,395
Totals	387,109	82.99%	78,240	16.77%	1,113	0.24%	308,869	66.22%	466,462

== District 8 ==
2020 Washington's 8th congressional district election
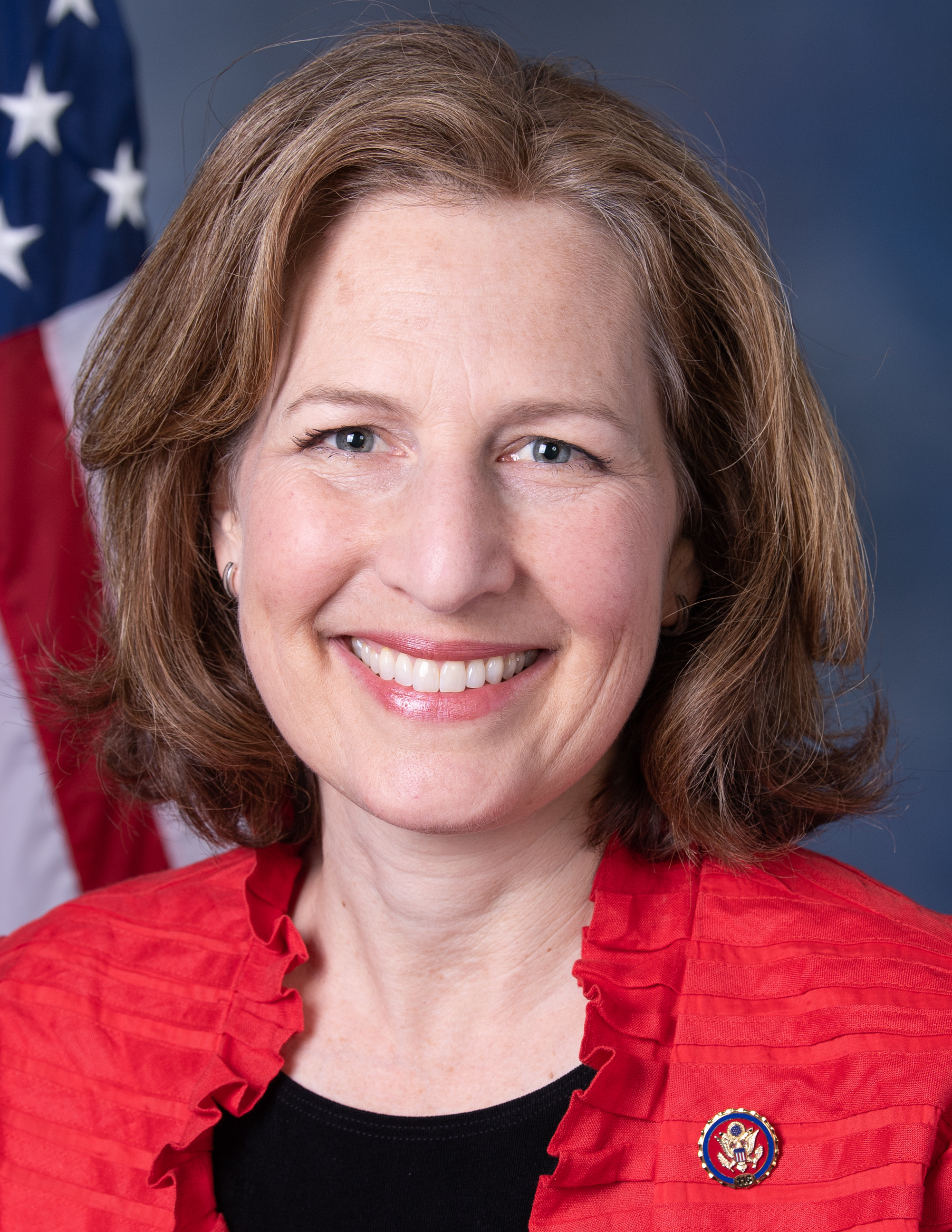

Candidate	Kim Schrier	Jesse Jensen
Party	Democratic	Republican
Popular vote	213,123	198,423
Percentage	51.7%	48.2%
- Schrier: 40–50% 50–60% 60–70% 70–80% 80–90% Jensen: 40–50% 50–60% 60–70% 70–80% 80–90% >90% Tie: 50% No data
U.S. Representative before election
Kim Schrier
Democratic
Elected U.S. Representative
Kim Schrier
Democratic

The 8th district encompasses the eastern suburbs of Seattle including Sammamish, Maple Valley, Covington, Hobart, Issaquah, and Auburn and stretches into rural central Washington, including Chelan County and Kittitas County, as well as taking in eastern Pierce County. The incumbent was Democrat Kim Schrier, who flipped the district and was elected with 52.4% of the vote in 2018.

=== Primary election ===
==== Candidates ====
===== Declared =====
- Keith Arnold (Democratic)
- Corey Bailey (independent), fisherman
- Ryan Burkett (no party preference)
- Jesse Jensen (Republican), U.S. Army veteran and Amazon senior project manager
- James Mitchell (Democratic), entrepreneur
- Dean Saulibio (Trump Republican), U.S. Army veteran
- Kim Schrier (Democratic), incumbent U.S. Representative
- Keith Swank (Republican), former Seattle Police Department officer, candidate for Washington's 8th congressional district in 2012, and candidate for U.S. Senate in 2018

===== Declined =====
- Reagan Dunn (Republican), King County Councilmember and son of former U.S. Representative Jennifer Dunn

==== Primary results ====
Results by county Schrier: 30–40% 50–60%

Nonpartisan blanket primary results
Party	Candidate	Votes	%
Democratic	Kim Schrier (incumbent)	106,611	43.3
Republican	Jesse Jensen	49,368	20.0
Republican	Keith R. Swank	42,809	17.4
Trump Republican Party	Dean Saulibio	28,976	11.8
Independent	Corey Bailey	6,552	2.7
Democratic	James Mitchell	6,187	2.5
Democratic	Keith Arnold	4,111	1.7
No party preference	Ryan Dean Burkett	1,458	0.6
Write-in		289	0.1
Total votes		246,361	100.0

==== Endorsements ====
Jesse Jensen (R)

U.S. representatives

- Dave Reichert, former U.S. Representative from Washington's 8th congressional district

Organizations

- War Veterans Fund
Kim Schrier (D)

U.S. presidents

- Barack Obama, 44th president of the United States (2009-2017), U.S. Senator from Illinois (2005-2008)

U.S. vice presidents

- Joe Biden, 47th vice president of the United States (2009-2017), U.S. Senator from Delaware (1973-2009), 2020 Presidential nominee

U.S. senators

- Patty Murray, U.S. senator from Washington

U.S. representatives

- Suzan DelBene, representative from Washington's 1st Congressional District
- Pramila Jayapal, representative from Washington's 7th Congressional District
- Derek Kilmer, representative from Washington's 6th Congressional District
- Rick Larsen, representative from Washington's 2nd Congressional District
- Adam Smith, representative from Washington's 9th Congressional District

State and local officials

- Jay Inslee, Governor of Washington

Organizations

- 314 Action
- EMILY's List
- League of Conservation Voters Action Fund
- Sierra Club

Newspapers

- The Seattle Times
- The Stranger

=== General election ===
==== Predictions ====
Source	Ranking	As of
The Cook Political Report	Likely D	November 2, 2020
Inside Elections	Safe D	October 28, 2020
Sabato's Crystal Ball	Lean D	November 2, 2020
Politico	Likely D	November 2, 2020
Daily Kos	Safe D	November 2, 2020
RCP	Lean D	November 2, 2020

==== Results ====
Washington's 8th congressional district, 2020
Party	Candidate	Votes	%
Democratic	Kim Schrier (incumbent)	213,123	51.7
Republican	Jesse Jensen	198,423	48.1
Write-in		566	0.1
Total votes		412,112	100.0
Democratic hold			

==== By county ====
County results
County	Kim Schrier Democratic		Jesse Jensen Republican		Write-in Various		Margin		Total votes
County	#	%	#	%	#	%	#	%	Total votes
Chelan	19,503	45.81%	23,005	54.03%	68	0.16%	-3,502	-8.23%	42,576
Douglas (part)	3,629	40.70%	5,278	59.19%	10	0.11%	-1,649	-18.49%	8,917
King (part)	137,178	58.65%	96,496	41.26%	201	0.09%	40,682	17.39%	233,875
Kittitas	11,565	44.81%	14,204	55.03%	41	0.16%	-2,639	-10.22%	25,810
Pierce (part)	41,248	40.87%	59,440	58.89%	246	0.24%	-18,192	-18.02%	100,934
Totals	213,123	51.71%	198,423	48.15%	566	0.14%	14,700	3.57%	412,112

== District 9 ==
2020 Washington's 9th congressional district election
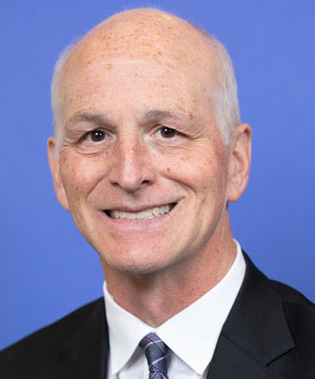

Candidate	Adam Smith	Doug Basler
Party	Democratic	Republican
Popular vote	258,771	89,697
Percentage	74.1%	25.7%
- Smith: 50–60% 60–70% 70–80% 80–90% >90% Tie: 40–50% No data
U.S. Representative before election
Adam Smith
Democratic
Elected U.S. Representative
Adam Smith
Democratic

The 9th congressional district stretches from small parts of northeastern Tacoma up to southeastern Seattle, taking in the surrounding suburbs, including Federal Way, Des Moines, Kent, SeaTac, Renton, Mercer Island, and Bellevue. The incumbent was Democrat Adam Smith, who was re-elected with 67.9% of the vote in 2018.

=== Primary election ===
==== Candidates ====
===== Declared =====
- Doug Basler (Republican)
- Jorge Besada (Libertarian)
- Joshua Campbell (Republican)
- Adam Smith (Democratic), incumbent U.S. Representative

==== Results ====
Results by county Smith: 60–70% 70–80%

Nonpartisan blanket primary results
Party	Candidate	Votes	%
Democratic	Adam Smith (incumbent)	145,601	73.6
Republican	Doug Basler	30,923	15.6
Republican	Joshua Campbell	15,983	8.1
Libertarian	Jorge Besada	4,792	2.4
Write-in		560	0.3
Total votes		197,859	100.0

=== General election ===
==== Predictions ====
Source	Ranking	As of
The Cook Political Report	Safe D	November 2, 2020
Inside Elections	Safe D	October 28, 2020
Sabato's Crystal Ball	Safe D	November 2, 2020
Politico	Safe D	November 2, 2020
Daily Kos	Safe D	November 2, 2020
RCP	Safe D	November 2, 2020

==== Results ====
Washington's 9th congressional district, 2020
Party	Candidate	Votes	%
Democratic	Adam Smith (incumbent)	258,771	74.1
Republican	Doug Basler	89,697	25.7
Write-in		582	0.2
Total votes		349,050	100.0
Democratic hold			

==== By county ====
County results
County	Adam Smith Democratic		Doug Basler Republican		Write-in Various		Margin		Total votes
County	#	%	#	%	#	%	#	%	Total votes
King (part)	250,948	74.63%	84,745	25.20%	544	0.16%	166,203	49.43%	336,237
Pierce (part)	7,823	61.06%	4,952	38.65%	38	0.30%	2,871	22.41%	12,813
Totals	258,771	74.14%	89,697	25.70%	582	0.17%	169,074	48.44%	349,050

== District 10 ==
2020 Washington's 10th congressional district election
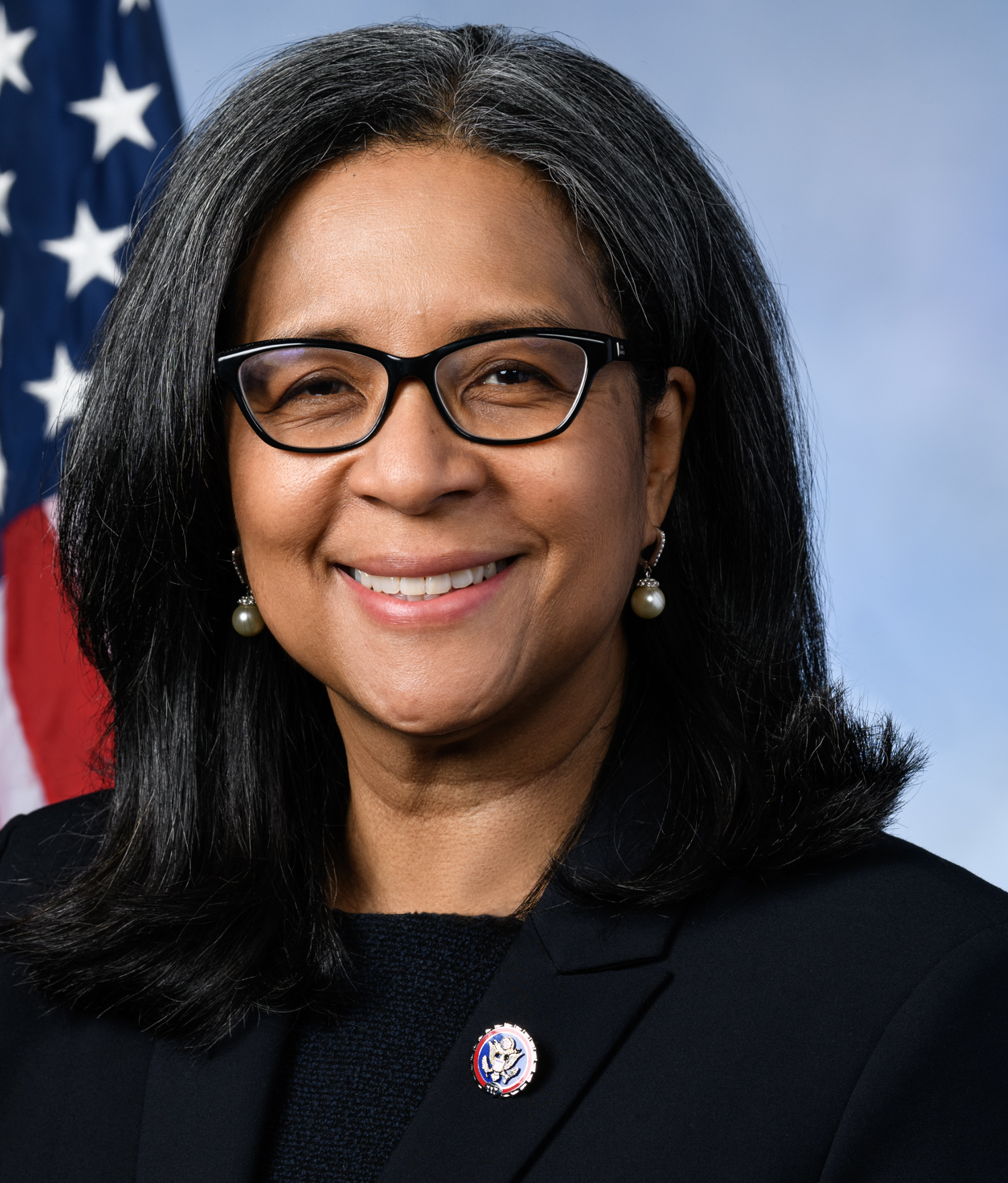

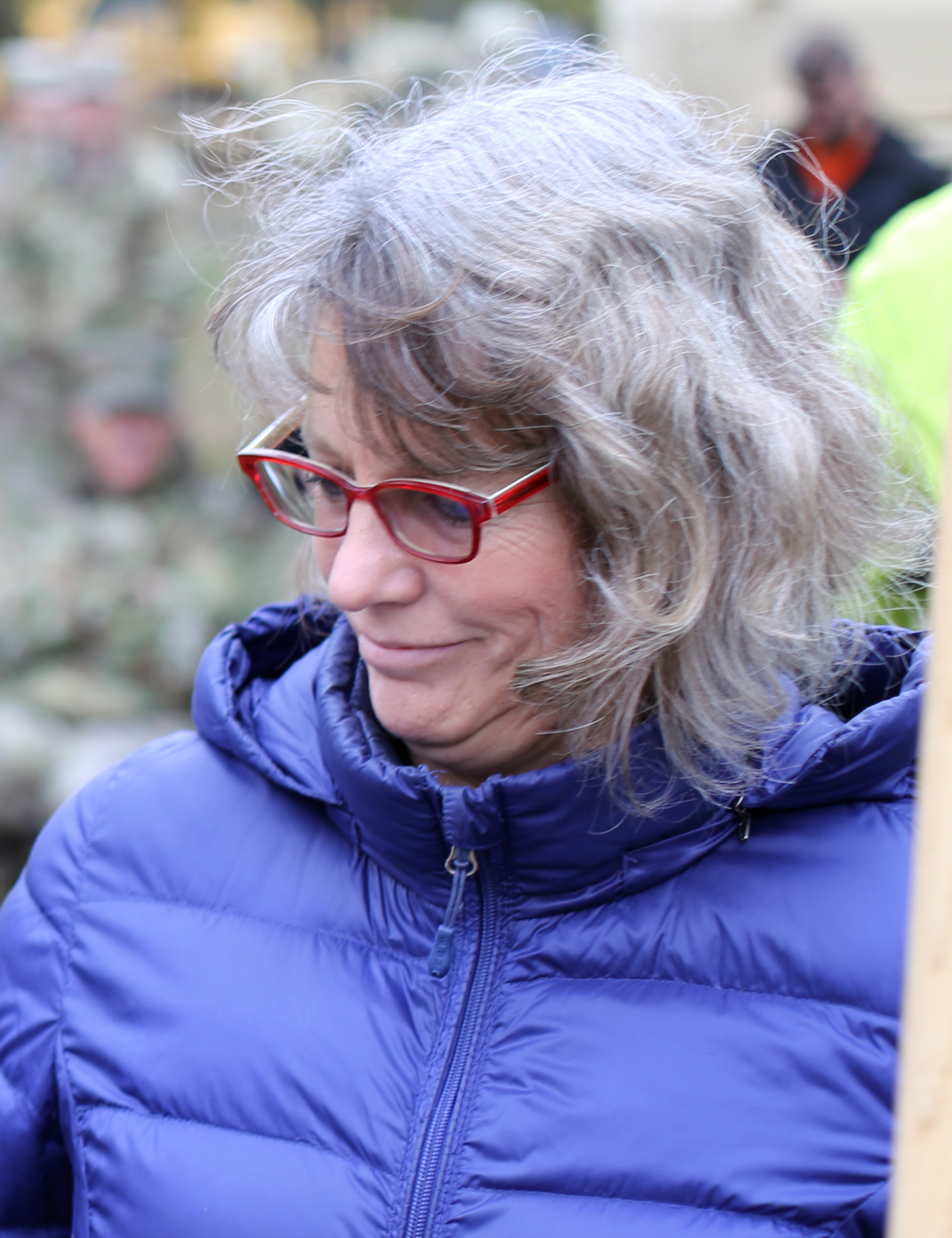

Candidate	Marilyn Strickland	Beth Doglio	Write–in (Note: Most Write-ins are thought to be for Marty McClendon, who ran a write-in campaign. However, the election report does not separate the write-in votes by candidate.)
Party	Democratic	Democratic
Popular vote	167,937	121,040	51,430
Percentage	49.3%	35.6%	15.1%
- Strickland: 30–40% 40–50% 50–60% 60–70% 70–80% 80–90% >90% Doglio: 30–40% 40–50% 50–60% 60–70% >90% Write-In: 40–50% 50–60% 60–70% Tie: 40–50% No data
U.S. Representative before election
Denny Heck
Democratic
Elected U.S. Representative
Marilyn Strickland
Democratic

The 10th district includes Olympia and the Tacoma suburbs, including Puyallup, Lakewood, and University Place. The incumbent was Democrat Denny Heck, who was re-elected with 61.5% of the vote in 2018. On December 4, 2019, Heck announced that he will retire from Congress and not seek re-election.

=== Primary election ===
==== Candidates ====
===== Declared =====
- Mary Bacon (Democratic), environmental scientist and U.S. Army veteran
- Randy Bell (Democratic)
- Richard Boyce (Congress Sucks), Independent candidate for Washington's 10th congressional district in 2016
- Todd Buckley (independent), data analyst
- Joshua Collins (Essential Workers), truck driver
- Beth Doglio (Democratic), state representative
- Phil Gardner (Democratic), former district director for U.S. Representative Denny Heck
- Don Hewett (Republican), executive engineer
- Rian Ingrim (Republican), businessman and U.S. Army Veteran
- Dean Johnson (Republican), Puyallup city councilman
- Ralph Johnson (Republican)
- Eric LeMay (Democratic), businessman
- Jackson Maynard (Republican), attorney
- Gordon Press (Republican)
- Kristine Reeves (Democratic), former state representative
- Nancy Dailey Slotnick (Republican), businesswoman and U.S. Army veteran
- Marilyn Strickland (Democratic), CEO of the Seattle Metropolitan Chamber of Commerce and former mayor of Tacoma
- Ryan Tate (Republican), software engineer
- Sam Wright (Democratic)

===== Declined =====
- Laurie Dolan (Democratic), state representative
- Denny Heck (Democratic), incumbent U.S. Representative (running for lieutenant governor)
- Sam Hunt (Democratic), state senator
- Christine Kilduff (Democratic), state representative
- Chris Reykdal (Democratic), Washington Superintendent of Public Instruction (running for reelection)
- Cheryl Selby (Democratic), mayor of Olympia
- Kim Wyman (Republican), Washington Secretary of State (running for reelection)

==== Endorsements ====
Joshua Collins

Organizations

- Our Revolution – Thurston County, Washington, chapter
Beth Doglio

U.S. Senators

- Bernie Sanders, U.S. senator from Vermont

U.S. Representatives

- Pramila Jayapal, U.S. representative from WA-7
- Mark Pocan, U.S. representative from WI-2
- Jamie Raskin, U.S. representative from MD-8

Individuals

- Maia Bellon, former director of the Washington Department of Ecology
- Jamaal Bowman, 2020 Democratic nominee for New York's 16th congressional district

Organizations

- League of Conservation Voters Action Fund
- LGBTQ Victory Fund
- Sierra Club
- Sunrise Movement
Kristine Reeves

Federal officeholders

- Adam Smith, U.S. representative from Washington's 9th congressional district
Marilyn Strickland

State politicians

- Victoria Woodards, Mayor of Tacoma

=== Debate ===
2020 Washington's 10th congressional district primary debate
No.	Date	Host	Moderator	Link	Essential Workers	Democratic	Democratic	Democratic	Republican	Democratic
Key: P Participant A Absent N Not invited I Invited W Withdrawn										
Key: P Participant A Absent N Not invited I Invited W Withdrawn					Joshua Collins	Beth Doglio	Phil Gardner	Kristine Reeves	Nancy Slotnick	Marilyn Strickland
1	Jul. 2, 2020	The Nature Conservancy Washington; Washington State Wire			P	P	P	P	P	P

==== Primary results ====
Results by county Strickland: 10–20% 20–30%; Doglio: 20–30%

Nonpartisan blanket primary results
Party	Candidate	Votes	%
Democratic	Marilyn Strickland	45,988	20.4
Democratic	Beth Doglio	34,254	15.2
Democratic	Kristine Reeves	29,236	12.9
Republican	Rian Ingrim	25,688	11.4
Republican	Jackson Maynard	18,526	8.2
Republican	Dean Johnson	16,700	7.4
Republican	Nancy Dailey Slotnick	15,201	6.7
Republican	Don Hewett	10,750	4.8
Democratic	Phil Gardner	5,292	2.3
Republican	Ryan Tate	4,196	1.9
Democratic	Mary Bacon	3,992	1.8
Independent	Todd Buckley	3,552	1.6
Democratic	Eric LeMay	3,072	1.4
Essential Workers	Joshua Collins	2,667	1.2
Congress Sucks	Richard Boyce	2,302	1.0
Republican	Ralph Johnson	1,441	0.6
Republican	Gordon Allen Pross	1,186	0.5
Democratic	Sam Wright	1,129	0.5
Democratic	Randolph Bell	563	0.2
Write-in		267	0.1
Total votes		226,002	100.0

=== General election ===
==== Predictions ====
Source	Ranking	As of
The Cook Political Report	Safe D	November 2, 2020
Inside Elections	Safe D	October 28, 2020
Sabato's Crystal Ball	Safe D	November 2, 2020
Politico	Safe D	November 2, 2020
Daily Kos	Safe D	November 2, 2020
RCP	Safe D	November 2, 2020

==== Polling ====
Poll source	Date(s) administered	Sample size	Margin of error	Marilyn Strickland (D)	Beth Doglio (D)	Undecided
GQR Research (Note: Poll sponsored by Strickland's campaign)	August 24–28, 2020	400 (LV)	± 4.9%	43%	22%	35%

==== Results ====
Washington's 10th congressional district, 2020
Party	Candidate	Votes	%
Democratic	Marilyn Strickland	167,937	49.3
Democratic	Beth Doglio	121,040	35.6
Write-in		51,430	15.1
Total votes		340,407	100.0
Democratic hold			

==== By county ====
County results
County	Marilyn Strickland Democratic		Beth Doglio Democratic		Write-in Various		Margin		Total votes
County	#	%	#	%	#	%	#	%	Total votes
Mason (part)	3,265	43.83%	2,775	37.25%	1,410	18.93%	490	6.58%	7,450
Pierce (part)	101,265	52.31%	60,080	31.04%	32,240	16.65%	41,185	21.27%	193,585
Thurston (part)	63,407	45.49%	58,185	41.75%	17,780	12.76%	5,222	3.75%	139,372
Totals	167,937	49.33%	121,040	35.56%	51,430	15.11%	46,897	13.78%	340,407

== Notes ==
Partisan clients
