= 2000 Pierce County Executive election =

- November 5, 2000

Nominee	John Ladenburg	Jan Shabro
Party	Democratic	Republican
Popular vote	147,531	99,382
Percentage	59.64%	40.18%
County Executive before election
Doug Sutherland
Republican
Elected County Executive
John Ladenburg
Democratic

The 2000 Pierce County Executive election took place on November 7, 2000. Incumbent Republican County Executive Doug Sutherland was term-limited and could not seek re-election to a third term, and instead successfully ran for Commissioner of Public Lands.

Two candidates ran to succeed Sutherland: Democrat John Ladenburg, the County Prosecuting Attorney, and Republican Jan Shabro, a County Councilwoman. The News Tribune praised both Ladenburg and Shabro as "two capable executive candidates," but ultimately endorsed Ladenburg, concluding that his management experience running the prosecutor's office was a "formidable advantage."

Ladenburg ultimately defeated Shabro in a landslide, receiving 60 percent of the vote to Shabro's 40 percent.

== Primary election ==
=== Candidates ===
- John Ladenburg, County Prosecuting Attorney (Democratic)
- Jan Shabro, County Councilmember (Republican)

=== Results ===
Blanket primary results
Party	Candidate	Votes	%
Democratic	John Ladenburg	82,208	58.56%
Republican	Jan Shabro	57,860	41.22%
Write-in		303	0.22%
Total votes		140,371	100.00%

== General election ==
=== Results ===
2000 Pierce County Executive election
Party	Candidate	Votes	%
Democratic	John Ladenburg	147,531	59.64%
Republican	Jan Shabro	99,382	40.18%
Write-in		442	0.22%
Total votes		247,355	100.00%
Democratic gain from Republican			
