= Inside Olympia =

Public affairs TV show in Washington state, US

Inside Olympia is a weekly Washington State public affairs TV show on the TVW network that began airing in 1998. The show features in-depth, one-on-one interviews and panel discussions with major figures in Washington State government and public affairs, including state governors, executive cabinet-level agency leaders, state legislators, and labor union leaders. The show is considered a major component of the services that have earned TVW the nickname "Washington state’s own C-SPAN."

Inside Olympia has been hosted by Northwest News Network reporter Austin Jenkins since 2008. From 2003 to 2008, the show was hosted by capitol reporter and later Washington State Public Disclosure Commission chair David Ammons, who took the place of TVW co-founder and later Lieutenant Governor of Washington Denny Heck. The first host was Barry Mitzman, formerly of KCTS-TV.
