= 2004 Washington Public Lands Commissioner election =

- November 2, 2004
Candidate	Doug Sutherland	Mike Cooper
Party	Republican	Democratic
Popular vote	1,309,441	1,223,207
Percentage	49.96%	46.67%
- Sutherland: 40–50% 50–60% 60–70% 70–80% Cooper: 40–50% 50–60%
Public Lands Commissioner before election
Doug Sutherland
Republican
Elected Public Lands Commissioner
Doug Sutherland
Republican

The 2004 Washington Public Lands Commissioner election was held on November 2, 2004, to elect the Washington Public Lands Commissioner, concurrently with the 2004 U.S. presidential election, as well as elections to the U.S. Senate and various state and local elections, including for U.S. House and governor of Washington.

Incumbent Republican Public Lands Commissioner Doug Sutherland narrowly defeated Democratic challenger Mike Cooper. Primary elections took place on September 14.

== Republican primary ==
=== Candidates ===
==== Nominee ====
- Doug Sutherland, incumbent public lands commissioner (2001–2009)

=== Results ===
Republican primary results
Party	Candidate	Votes	%
Republican	Doug Sutherland (incumbent)	433,069	100.00%
Total votes		433,069	100.00%

== Democratic primary ==
=== Candidates ===
==== Nominee ====
- Mike Cooper, state representative (1997–2005)

=== Results ===
Democratic primary results
Party	Candidate	Votes	%
Democratic	Mike Cooper	600,476	100.00%
Total votes		600,476	100.00%

== Libertarian primary ==
=== Candidates ===
==== Nominee ====
- Steve Layman, candidate for public lands commissioner in 2000

=== Results ===
Libertarian primary results
Party	Candidate	Votes	%
Libertarian	Steve Layman	12,641	100.00%
Total votes		12,641	100.00%

== General election ==
=== Endorsements ===
Doug Sutherland (R)

Newspapers

- The Seattle Times

=== Results ===
2004 Washington Public Lands Commissioner election
Party	Candidate	Votes	%	±%
Republican	Doug Sutherland (incumbent)	1,309,441	49.96	+0.48
Democratic	Mike Cooper	1,223,207	46.67	+1.55
Libertarian	Steve Layman	88,171	3.36	–2.04
Total votes		2,620,819	100.00	N/A
Republican hold				

==== By county ====
County results
County	Doug Sutherland Republican		Mike Cooper Democratic		Steve Layman Libertarian		Margin		Total votes
County	#	%	#	%	#	%	#	%	Total votes
Adams	3,418	72.68%	1,173	24.94%	112	2.38%	2,245	47.74%	4,703
Asotin	4,718	58.84%	3,063	38.20%	237	2.96%	1,655	20.64%	8,018
Benton	41,003	68.00%	17,562	29.13%	1,733	2.87%	23,441	38.88%	60,298
Chelan	17,980	66.48%	8,237	30.46%	828	3.06%	9,743	36.03%	27,045
Clallam	18,114	55.26%	13,541	41.31%	1,124	3.43%	4,573	13.95%	32,779
Clark	84,627	54.65%	64,916	41.92%	5,313	3.43%	19,711	12.73%	154,856
Columbia	1,409	73.31%	460	23.93%	53	2.76%	949	49.38%	1,922
Cowlitz	20,157	51.14%	18,017	45.71%	1,240	3.15%	2,140	5.43%	39,414
Douglas	8,667	69.50%	3,433	27.53%	370	2.97%	5,234	41.97%	12,470
Ferry	1,934	62.81%	1,025	33.29%	120	3.90%	909	29.52%	3,079
Franklin	10,064	65.72%	4,812	31.42%	438	2.86%	5,252	34.30%	15,314
Garfield	876	74.11%	280	23.69%	26	2.20%	596	50.42%	1,182
Grant	16,417	68.27%	6,886	28.64%	743	3.09%	9,531	39.64%	24,046
Grays Harbor	14,904	56.82%	10,609	40.45%	716	2.73%	4,295	16.38%	26,229
Island	18,423	52.94%	14,901	42.82%	1,476	4.24%	3,522	10.12%	34,800
Jefferson	7,030	41.08%	9,465	55.31%	617	3.61%	-2,435	-14.23%	17,112
King	319,257	39.72%	456,907	56.84%	27,634	3.44%	-137,650	-17.12%	803,798
Kitsap	54,819	49.49%	51,970	46.92%	3,982	3.59%	2,849	2.57%	110,771
Kittitas	8,698	58.28%	5,716	38.30%	510	3.42%	2,982	19.98%	14,924
Klickitat	4,943	58.34%	3,192	37.67%	338	3.99%	1,751	20.67%	8,473
Lewis	20,047	67.90%	8,590	29.09%	889	3.01%	11,457	38.80%	29,526
Lincoln	3,655	70.13%	1,407	27.00%	150	2.88%	2,248	43.13%	5,212
Mason	12,878	55.34%	9,554	41.06%	837	3.60%	3,324	14.29%	23,269
Okanogan	9,217	62.11%	4,998	33.68%	624	4.21%	4,219	28.43%	14,839
Pacific	4,913	51.92%	4,235	44.75%	315	3.33%	678	7.16%	9,463
Pend Oreille	3,421	59.76%	2,046	35.74%	258	4.51%	1,375	24.02%	5,725
Pierce	159,691	54.05%	127,213	43.06%	8,535	2.89%	32,478	10.99%	295,439
San Juan	3,448	37.22%	5,308	57.30%	508	5.48%	-1,860	-20.08%	9,264
Skagit	26,028	53.61%	20,864	42.97%	1,662	3.42%	5,164	10.64%	48,554
Skamania	2,629	55.34%	1,903	40.05%	219	4.61%	726	15.28%	4,751
Snohomish	130,970	47.72%	134,777	49.11%	8,706	3.17%	-3,807	-1.39%	274,453
Spokane	104,699	56.10%	75,245	40.32%	6,671	3.57%	29,454	15.78%	186,615
Stevens	12,248	65.62%	5,672	30.39%	745	3.99%	6,576	35.23%	18,665
Thurston	53,906	51.67%	47,000	45.05%	3,425	3.28%	6,906	6.62%	104,331
Wahkiakum	1,202	59.30%	761	37.54%	64	3.16%	441	21.76%	2,027
Walla Walla	13,370	63.99%	6,934	33.18%	591	2.83%	6,436	30.80%	20,895
Whatcom	39,338	48.11%	39,578	48.41%	2,847	3.48%	-240	-0.29%	81,763
Whitman	9,043	55.53%	6,634	40.73%	609	3.74%	2,409	14.79%	16,286
Yakima	41,280	60.25%	24,323	35.50%	2,906	4.24%	16,957	24.75%	68,509
Totals	1,309,441	49.96%	1,223,207	46.67%	88,171	3.36%	86,234	3.29%	2,620,819

Counties that flipped from Republican to Democratic

- Snohomish (largest city: Everett)
- Whatcom (largest city: Bellingham)
