= Washington Public Records Act =

The Public Records Act (PRA) is a law of the U.S. state of Washington requiring public access to all records and materials from state and local agencies. It was originally passed as a ballot initiative by voters in 1972 and revised several times by the state legislature. The definition of public records, especially concerning the state legislature, was subject to several legal challenges in the decades since the law was passed.

In 2018, a county judge ruled that legislative records and communications were subject to public disclosure, after a lawsuit was filed by media outlets. In response, the state legislature appealed the ruling and introduced a bill that would exempt their records from the act. The bill was passed by the legislature but was vetoed by Governor Jay Inslee after public outcry; the lawsuit was subsequently ruled in favor of the media outlets and upheld by the Washington Supreme Court.

The act is listed in the Revised Code of Washington as Chapter 42, Section 56.

== Background ==
The Washington Coalition for Open Government (COG) was formed from several political groups in June 1971 to push for public disclosure legislation. The state legislature had debated laws on campaign disclosures repeatedly beginning in 1963 and passed an open meetings law in the 1971 session, but avoided addressing public records. The coalition drafted a "package" of "right-to-know" legislation in an initiative that was filed in March.

The initiative, labeled Initiative to the People 276, raised questions of constitutionality from State Attorney General Slade Gorton, but was allowed onto the November 7 ballot. Initiative 276 was passed by 72 percent of voters, but attracted immediate legal challenges. The initiative became law and took effect on January 1, 1973.

Prior to the initiative's passing, the state legislature passed a law in 1971 defining legislative records as "correspondence, amendments, reports, and minutes of meetings".

== Legal challenges ==
=== Records on privately owned devices ===
In 2015, the Washington Supreme Court ruled unanimously in a case against Pierce County Prosecutor Mark Lindquist that records created on personal devices are public records if they pertain to public business. The Court established a process for reviewing mixed records to identify and release public records. The California Supreme Court also cited the Lindquist ruling in a similar case.

=== State legislative records ===
In early 2017, journalists from The Seattle Times and Northwest News Network filed public records requests for the calendars of Democratic House Speaker Frank Chopp, Democratic Senate Majority Leader Sharon Nelson, Republican Senate Majority Leader Mark Schoesler, and Republican Minority Leader Dan Kristiansen, related to the ongoing debate on education funding in the wake of the McCleary decision. The Times reported that lawmakers who had once voluntarily released records, such as emails and calendars, declined during recent sessions over the education funding debate, citing an exemption in the 1971 public records definition. Other media outlets filed records requests for all 147 members of the state legislature during the 2017 sessions, but were rebuffed or redirected to lawyers. Other public records requests related to sexual harassment and misconduct allegations levied against state legislators were also denied.

On September 12, 2017, the Associated Press and other Washingtonian news organizations filed a lawsuit against the state legislature over the alleged exemption for daily schedules, emails, text messages, and other correspondence related to legislative work. The lawsuit was heard in the Thurston County Superior Court, where a judge ruled in favor of the media coalition, finding that the offices of individual legislators were subject to the Public Records Act. The law would, however, not apply to administrative offices in the state legislature, under the judge's ruling. The ruling was upheld by a 7–2 decision of the Washington Supreme Court on December 19, 2019, but administrative offices were excluded from the definition of state agencies.

While the state legislature appealed the ruling, a bill to remove the legislature from the Public Records Act was announced by state legislators on February 21. The proposed bill allowed limited release of lawmaker calendars and final disciplinary reports beginning July 1, but exempted retroactive records, as well as policy development records and potentially private information. It was given a committee work session and public hearing less than 24 hours after being announced in a bid to hasten its passing. On February 23, the bill was passed by the State Senate 41–7 and State House 83–14, less than 48 hours after becoming public and with only four legislators speaking during the debate.

In response to the bill's passing and impending action by Governor Jay Inslee, The Seattle Times and twelve other large newspapers in Washington state published front-page editorials urging Inslee to veto the bill. For The Seattle Times, it was the first front-page editorial to be published in 110 years, the last being a call for wealthy businessmen to support the then-upcoming Alaska–Yukon–Pacific Exposition in 1908. By Wednesday, February 28, over 8,000 emails and 4,300 phone calls were received by the Governor's Office in opposition of the bill's signing. In an interview with on MSNBC's All In with Chris Hayes, Governor Inslee said that he was opposed to the bill but stated that the bill's "veto-proof majority" would prevent him from blocking it. On March 1, Inslee vetoed the bill, citing public outcry and calls from lawmakers who regretted the bill's accelerated passage.

In 2023, several newspapers reported that state legislators had redacted portions of their internal communications that were released under records requests. The practice began as early as 2021. A lawsuit was filed by the Washington Coalition for Open Government in the Thurston County Superior Court in April 2023. The judge sided with the state legislators, arguing that they had a right to "legislative privilege"; a poll of 403 state voters found that 82 percent of respondents favored compliance with the public records act. The Seattle Times sent a questionnaire on the issue to all 147 state legislators that was returned with 40 percent of respondents across party lines planned to not withhold records under the ruling.

== See also ==
- Freedom of information in the United States
