= Beth Doglio =

American politician (born 1965)

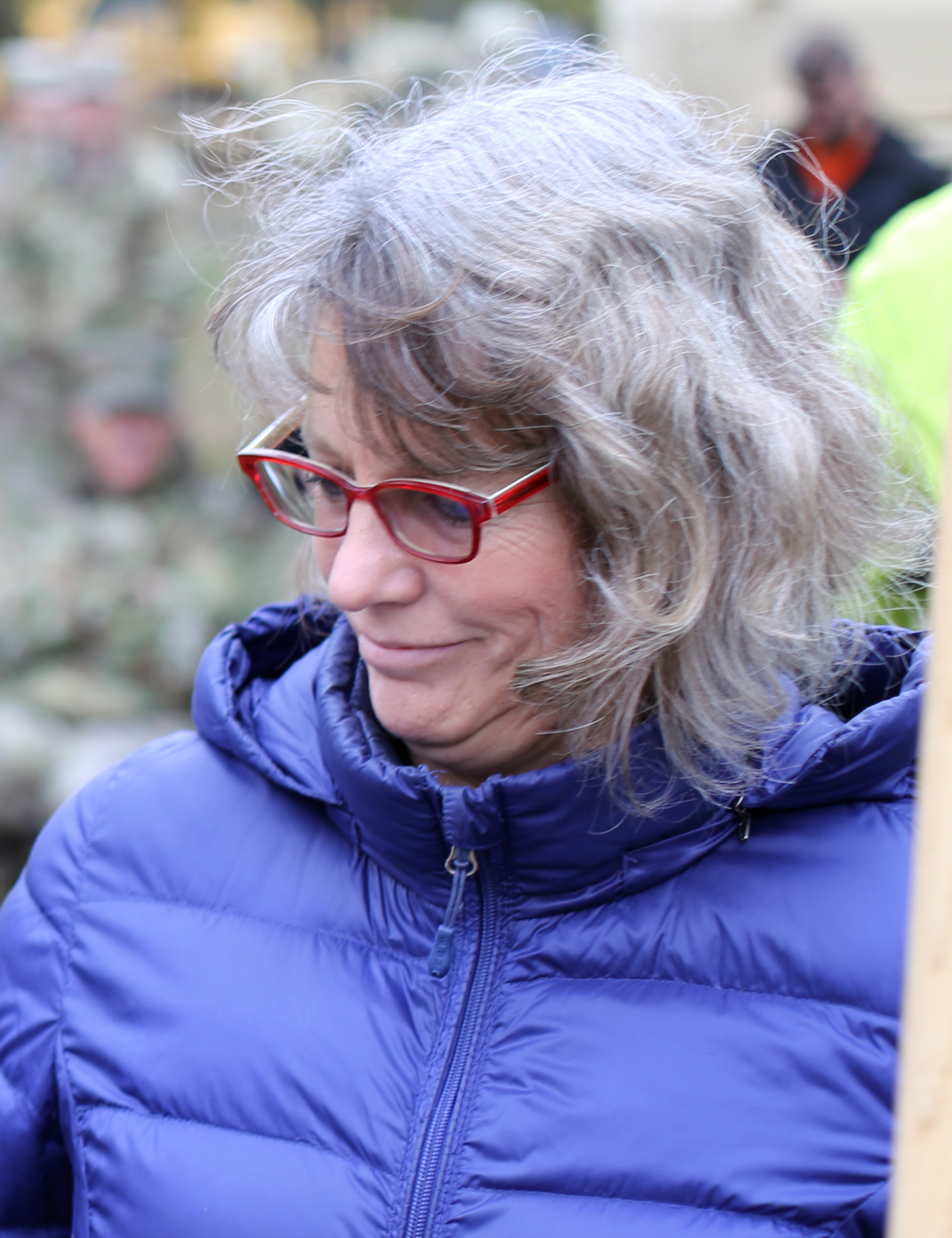

Member of the Washington House of Representatives from the 22nd district
- Incumbent
- Assumed office January 9, 2023 Serving with Jessica Bateman
- Preceded by: Laurie Dolan
- In office January 9, 2017 – January 11, 2021
- Preceded by: Sam Hunt
- Succeeded by: Jessica Bateman

Personal details
- Born: 1965 (age 60–61) Illinois, U.S.
- Party: Democratic
- Spouse: Eddy Cates
- Education: Indiana University Bloomington (BA)
- Website: Campaign website

Beth Maureen Doglio (born 1965) is an American politician and activist who serves as a member of the Washington House of Representatives for Washington's 22nd legislative district. She originally served an initial term between 2017 and 2021, retiring to run for Washington's 10th congressional district in the 2020 elections; she placed second in the primary and lost to fellow Democrat Marilyn Strickland in the general election. In 2022 she ran for election to the other representative position in Washington's 22nd legislative district to replace retiring representative Laurie Dolan.

== Education ==
Doglio earned a Bachelor of Arts degree in political science and telecommunication from Indiana University in 1987.

== Career ==
During the 1988 Democratic Party presidential primaries, Doglio was a state director for Senator Paul Simon's campaign. After moving to Washington, she was an employee at Seattle Public Utilities and Telcordia Technologies. Doglio was the founding executive director of Washington Conservation Voters, serving from 1991 to 1995. In 1996, she worked as a field organizer for NARAL. She also worked as an organizer for Peace Action. Doglio is a progressive, and has advocated Medicare for All, immigration reform, Green New Deal legislation, and the expansion of public housing in the Puget Sound region.

=== 2020 congressional election ===
In March 2020, Doglio announced that she would run for Washington's 10th congressional district in the 2020 elections after incumbent Representative Denny Heck opted to run for lieutenant governor of Washington instead of seeking reelection. She faced former state representative Kristine Reeves and former Tacoma mayor Marilyn Strickland, among others, in the nonpartisan blanket primary. Doglio came in second and lost to Strickland in the general election.

== Personal life ==
Doglio is married to Eddy Cates, a family physician in Lacey, Washington. They have two children. Doglio is openly bisexual.

Washington House of Representatives
Preceded by Sam Hunt	Member of the Washington House of Representatives from the 22nd district, Position 2; 2017–2021	Succeeded by Jessica Bateman
Preceded by Laurie Dolan	Member of the Washington House of Representatives from the 22nd district, Position 1; 2023–present	Incumbent
