= 1972 Washington Initiative 276 =

Initiative 276
- Campaign Finance

Results
Choice	Votes	%
Yes	959,143	72.02%
No	372,693	27.98%
Total votes	1,331,836	100.00%
- County results Yes 50–60% 60–70% 70–80%

Initiative to the People 276 (or the Public Disclosure Act) was a law approved by the people of Washington in a vote (plebiscite) held in 1972. The law required the state government to establish the Washington State Public Disclosure Commission in order to provide information to the public about campaign fundraising and expenditures The initiative was passed by the people at the same time as the November 1972 general election, by a margin of 72.02% to 27.98%.

The law has since been superseded by the Washington Public Records Act. The current law on the subject is codified in the Revised Code (RCW), Title 42, Chapter 56.

== Full title ==
The official long title of the Public Disclosure Act was

An ACT relating to campaign financing, activities of lobbyists, access to public records, and financial affairs of elective officers and candidates; requiring disclosure of sources of campaign contributions, objects of campaign expenditures, and amounts thereof; limiting campaign expenditures; regulating the activities of lobbyists and requiring reports of their expenditures; restricting use of public funds to influence legislative decisions; governing access to public records; specifying the manner in which public agencies will maintain such records; requiring disclosure of elective officials' and candidates' financial interests and activities; establishing a public disclosure commission to administer the act; and providing civil penalties.

== Results ==
Initiative 276 was approved with 72% of the vote.

1972 Washington Initiative 276
Choice	Votes	%
For	959,143	72.02
Against	372,693	27.98
Total	1,331,836	100.00
Source: Washington Secretary of State

=== By county ===
County results
County	Yes		No		Margin		Total votes
County	#	%	#	%	#	%	Total votes
Adams	2,634	62.46%	1,583	37.54%	1,051	24.92%	4,217
Asotin	3,238	63.89%	1,830	36.11%	1,408	27.78%	5,068
Benton	19,089	68.41%	8,816	31.59%	10,273	36.81%	27,905
Chelan	10,705	70.46%	4,489	29.54%	6,216	40.91%	15,194
Clallam	10,969	71.90%	4,286	28.10%	6,683	43.81%	15,255
Clark	39,921	75.62%	12,871	24.38%	27,050	51.24%	52,792
Columbia	1,010	51.56%	949	48.44%	61	3.11%	1,959
Cowlitz	18,624	72.90%	6,925	27.10%	11,699	45.79%	25,549
Douglas	4,914	69.57%	2,149	30.43%	2,765	39.15%	7,063
Ferry	805	59.45%	549	40.55%	256	18.91%	1,354
Franklin	6,239	66.49%	3,144	33.51%	3,095	32.99%	9,383
Garfield	935	63.74%	532	36.26%	403	27.47%	1,467
Grant	9,763	68.32%	4,527	31.68%	5,236	36.64%	14,290
Grays Harbor	15,351	69.81%	6,640	30.19%	8,711	39.61%	21,991
Island	7,495	73.41%	2,715	26.59%	4,780	46.82%	10,210
Jefferson	3,251	70.38%	1,368	29.62%	1,883	40.77%	4,619
King	365,079	76.82%	110,140	23.18%	254,939	53.65%	475,219
Kitsap	29,367	69.99%	12,594	30.01%	16,773	39.97%	41,961
Kittitas	6,660	70.62%	2,771	29.38%	3,889	41.24%	9,431
Klickitat	2,997	61.29%	1,893	38.71%	1,104	22.58%	4,890
Lewis	11,786	61.76%	7,299	38.24%	4,487	23.51%	19,085
Lincoln	2,966	61.23%	1,878	38.77%	1,088	22.46%	4,844
Mason	6,764	72.03%	2,627	27.97%	4,137	44.05%	9,391
Okanogan	6,162	64.24%	3,430	35.76%	2,732	28.48%	9,592
Pacific	4,511	70.62%	1,877	29.38%	2,634	41.23%	6,388
Pend Oreille	1,716	63.02%	1,007	36.98%	709	26.04%	2,723
Pierce	92,636	71.21%	37,455	28.79%	55,181	42.42%	130,091
San Juan	1,917	74.65%	651	25.35%	1,266	49.30%	2,568
Skagit	16,606	70.91%	6,813	29.09%	9,793	41.82%	23,419
Skamania	1,388	58.66%	978	41.34%	410	17.33%	2,366
Snohomish	71,232	73.84%	25,235	26.16%	45,997	47.68%	96,467
Spokane	78,227	66.51%	39,383	33.49%	38,844	33.03%	117,610
Stevens	3,917	54.25%	3,303	45.75%	614	8.50%	7,220
Thurston	25,718	71.94%	10,030	28.06%	15,688	43.88%	35,748
Wahkiakum	995	67.09%	488	32.91%	507	34.19%	1,483
Walla Walla	11,123	65.96%	5,741	34.04%	5,382	31.91%	16,864
Whatcom	22,967	68.46%	10,582	31.54%	12,385	36.92%	33,549
Whitman	10,693	69.50%	4,693	30.50%	6,000	39.00%	15,386
Yakima	28,773	60.93%	18,452	39.07%	10,321	21.85%	47,225
Totals	959,143	72.02%	372,693	27.98%	586,450	44.03%	1,331,836
