= Cathy Wolfe =

Washington State politician

Member of the Thurston County Board of County Commissioners from the 1st District
- In office 2001–2017
- Succeeded by: John (Hutch) Hutchings

Member of the Washington House of Representatives from the 22nd district
- In office January 11, 1993 – January 7, 2001
- Preceded by: Jennifer Belcher
- Succeeded by: Sam Hunt

Personal details
- Born: August 31, 1944 San Antonio, Texas, U.S.
- Party: Democratic
- Education: Evergreen State College (BA)
- Occupation: Analyst, Washington State Department of Revenue

Cathy Wolfe (born August 31, 1944) is an American politician who served as a member of the Thurston County Board of County Commissioners from 2001 to 2017 and a member of the Washington House of Representatives from 1993 to 2001. In the legislature, she represented Washington's 22nd legislative district as a Democrat. During her final term in the legislature, she served as the Democratic whip from 1999 to 2001.
