= TVW (Washington) =

- Country: United States
- Broadcast area: Washington state
- Headquarters: Olympia, Washington

Programming
- Language(s): American English
- Picture format: 1080i (HDTV)

History
- Launched: 1993; 32 years ago

Links
- Website: http://www.tvw.org

TVW is Washington State's public affairs network, providing gavel-to-gavel coverage of Washington State Legislature sessions, as well as arguments before the Washington Supreme Court, and other public affairs events. It is available via cable throughout the state, and is widely considered the model state-level equivalent of C-SPAN.

TVW was founded in 1993 by Stan Marshburn and politician Denny Heck. The latter would serve as host of the program Inside Olympia until 2003.

In 2017, TVW partnered with Central Washington University to add live and recorded "world-class speakers and cultural events" to its programming.
