= Rickert v. Public Disclosure Commission =

2007 Washington State Supreme Court case

Rickert v. Pub. Disclosure Comm'n (2007) was a Washington State Supreme Court case dealing with the First Amendment to the United States Constitution and the regulation of political speech. The case invalidated a Washington law that allowed for sanctions for statements made about a candidate for political office, if those statements were found by the State's Public Disclosure Commission to be false and to have been made with actual malice. The Court's decision was divided 5-4.

== Background ==
The plaintiff, Marilou Rickert, was an American lawyer and politician who ran for Washington State Senate in 2002 as a Green Party candidate against incumbent senator Tim Sheldon. The case was litigated by the American Civil Liberties Union.

== Decision ==
For the majority, Justice James M. Johnson wrote "The notion that the government, rather than the people, may be the final arbiter of truth in political debate is fundamentally at odds with the First Amendment." Three justices, Charles W. Johnson, Richard B. Sanders, and Susan Owens, signed the opinion.

Chief Justice Gerry L. Alexander wrote a separate concurring opinion, which stated that "the majority goes too far in concluding that any government censorship of political speech would run afoul of the First Amendment to the United States Constitution." However, because the statute in question prohibited both defamatory and non-defamatory speech, he joined the majority in invalidating the law.

In the dissent, joined by justices Bobbe J. Bridge, Tom Chambers and Mary E. Fairhurst, justice Barbara A. Madsen wrote that "the majority's decision is an invitation to lie with impunity." The dissent argued that because the law required that punishable speech be made with actual malice, as required by the invalidated law, the type of speech in question was not protected under the U.S. Constitution.
