= Jennifer Belcher =

American politician (1944–2022)

13th Washington State Commissioner of Public Lands
- In office January 13, 1993 – January 10, 2001
- Governor: Mike Lowry; Gary Locke
- Preceded by: Brian Boyle
- Succeeded by: Doug Sutherland

Member of the Washington House of Representatives from the 22nd district
- In office January 10, 1983 – January 11, 1993
- Preceded by: W. H. “Bill” Garson Jr.
- Succeeded by: Cathy Wolfe

Personal details
- Born: Jennifer Emerson Marion; January 4, 1944 Beckley, West Virginia, U.S.
- Died: March 31, 2022 (aged 78) Olympia, Washington, U.S.
- Party: Democratic
- Spouse: Larry Belcher
- Education: Bethany College (attended)
- Occupation: Management consultant

Jennifer Emerson Belcher (née Marion; January 4, 1944 – March 31, 2022) was an American politician who was the first woman to serve as Washington commissioner of public lands from 1993 to 2001. Belcher previously represented the 22nd district in the Washington House of Representatives from 1983 to 1993. Her major legislative achievements include subsidizing childcare for state employees and furthering equal pay for women in state government. As commissioner of public lands, she oriented the Washington State Department of Natural Resources toward conservation.

== Early life and education ==
Belcher was born Jennifer Emerson Marion on January 4, 1944 in Beckley, West Virginia, one of six children. According to her sister, their father was a truck driver for Kroger and a member of the Teamsters, even serving as president of his local union, and their mother was a homemaker and early adopter of recycling. Both were Democrats and environmentalists.

Belcher attended Bethany College in Bethany, West Virginia, for one year.

== Career ==
Belcher started in politics as a political aide to Governors Dan Evans and Dixy Lee Ray from 1973 to 1979.

=== State House of Representatives ===
Belcher first won election to the House in the 1982 election, taking her seat in 1983. Her leadership positions included stints as chair of the State Government Committee (1985–1986), Natural Resources (later Natural Resources and Parks) committee (1989–1992), and vice-chair of the Labor Committee (1983–1984).

Her major legislative achievements include subsidizing childcare for state employees and furthering equal pay for women in state government. She also worked on bills related to strip searches, minimum pay and farm labor standards, child abuse, and urban growth management.

=== Commissioner of public lands ===
In 1992, Belcher ran successfully for commissioner of public lands, defeating Republican Ann Anderson to become the first woman to hold that office. She swept into office as part of an unprecedented wave of women winning office in Washington, including Christine Gregoire, Deborah Senn, Judith Billings, and Washington's first female senator, Patty Murray.

As commissioner, Belcher ran the Washington State Department of Natural Resources, overseeing over five million acres of state-owned lands and shorelands, as well as various scientific, land management, and environmental restoration programs and related law enforcement functions.

In this role, Belcher hired the state's first female state forester, Kaleen Cottingham. The change Belcher brought and embodied was not always welcome. For example, Cottingham recalled seeing a sign taped up in a DNR men's bathroom: "Will the last white man leaving the natural resources building please put down the toilet lid.”

Regardless, Belcher instituted significant changes in her time at DNR. Perhaps her "crowning achievement" was finalization in 1997 of a 50-year Habitat Conservation Plan under the federal Endangered Species Act, governing management of Washington's state trust lands.

In 2000, Belcher decided not to run for a third term so that she could return to West Virginia to care for her parents, who had health issues. Belcher endorsed former Governor Mike Lowry in his bid to succeed her in the 2000 election. Despite his wide name recognition, solid environmental record, and Belcher's endorsement, Lowry lost to Republican Pierce County Executive Doug Sutherland, who succeeded Belcher in 2001.

=== Career outside politics ===
Belcher lived in Olympia, Washington and worked as a state employee and as president of Management Dynamics, which advised growing businesses.

== Death and legacy ==
After a long illness, Belcher died on March 31, 2022, at the age of 78. One obituary described Belcher's leadership of the DNR as "transformational", both in who was hired and in the department's policies. Leading forest ecologist Jerry Franklin called her "a revolutionary" for changing the DNR's direction with respect to ecological conservation and species protection.

== See also ==
- Washington State Department of Natural Resources
