= Doug Sutherland (American politician) =

American politician

14th Washington State Commissioner of Public Lands
- In office January 10, 2001 – January 14, 2009
- Governor: Gary Locke; Christine Gregoire
- Preceded by: Jennifer Belcher
- Succeeded by: Peter J. Goldmark

3rd Pierce County Executive
- In office January 1, 1993 – January 1, 2001
- Preceded by: Joe Stortini
- Succeeded by: John Ladenburg

Personal details
- Born: 1937 (age 88–89) Montana, U.S.
- Party: Republican
- Education: Central Washington University (BA)

Douglass B. Sutherland (born 1937), is an American politician who served as 14th commissioner of public lands of the state of Washington from 2001 to 2009. Sutherland was first elected to this statewide position in 2000, when he defeated former Governor Mike Lowry. He was re-elected in 2004, defeating challenger Mike Cooper. In 2008, Sutherland ran for a third term, but lost to Peter J. Goldmark, a rancher from Eastern Washington. He was mayor of Tacoma from 1982 to 1989.

== Early life and education ==
Born in Montana in 1937, Sutherland moved to Spokane, Washington as a child. His father was a union plasterer. As a student at Central Washington University, Sutherland spent his summers fighting wildfires in the forests of Northern California and Oregon as a smokejumper. Sutherland graduated with a Bachelor of Arts degree in history.

== Career ==
Sutherland spent eleven working at Boeing. In 1971, Sutherland purchased the Tacoma Tent and Awning Company, building it from four to thirty-four employees over the next two decades. Having seen the impact government can have on small businesses and families, Sutherland became involved in local politics.

From 1980 to 1981, Sutherland served as a member of the Tacoma City Council. After two years on the council, he was elected mayor of Tacoma, where he served from 1982 to 1989. As mayor, he completed the nation's first environmental community assessment with then-United States Environmental Protection Agency director William Ruckelshaus. He also served as the chair of the Puget Sound Air Quality Authority. During that time the PSAQA led Pierce, King, Snohomish and Kitsap counties into compliance with the Clean Air Act's new standards.

From 1989 to 1992, Sutherland served as the first City Manager of SeaTac, Washington. He was responsible for the creation, staffing and development of municipal services for the newly formed city. He helped lead SeaTac through pre-incorporation operations to its establishment as a fully functioning city in February 1990.

In 1992, Sutherland was elected Pierce County Executive, a position he held until his election in 2000 as Commissioner of Public Lands. As Pierce County Executive, he joined his Democratic counterparts in King and Snohomish counties to create the Tri-County Salmon Taskforce, addressing the cleanup of Puget Sound and finding ways to improve salmon habitat.

Sutherland was elected Washington Commissioner of Public Lands in 2000 and was re-elected in 2004.

=== Controversy ===
In 2005, he was investigated for sexual harassment because of inappropriate touching and commenting to a younger female employee (who later resigned from the position). Sutherland issued a formal apology to the employee. No further action was requested.

Sutherland's 2008 re-election campaign has been funded by contributions from a variety of sources. As of November 3, 2008 his campaign had received $571,716.62 from cash contributions and $602,131.08 from independent funding. The majority of the independent funding ($573,000) was provided from the Committee for Balanced Stewardship. The Committee for Balanced Stewardship is predominately funded by logging and mining companies. Major contributors include $100,000 from Weyerhaeuser; $75,000 from Rayonier; $50,000 from Glacier Northwest (the company currently strip mining and shipping from the Maury Island Aquatic Reserve); and $25,000 from Sierra Pacific. Some of the cash and in-kind contributions directly to Doug Sutherland's campaign are also associated with Taylor Shellfish (a company under investigation for illegally harvesting geoduck on DNR managed public state tidelands).

== See also ==
- List of mayors of Tacoma, Washington
