= Laurie Dolan =

American politician from Washington

Member of the Washington House of Representatives from the 22nd district
- In office January 9, 2017 – January 9, 2023
- Preceded by: Chris Reykdal
- Succeeded by: Beth Doglio

Personal details
- Born: Laurie Bruce Hutchison; 1952 (age 73–74) Colfax, Washington, U.S.
- Party: Democratic
- Spouse: Art
- Children: 2
- Education: University of Washington (BA); Gonzaga University (MA, PhD)
- Profession: Teacher

Laurie Bruce Hutchison Dolan (born 1952) is an American educator and politician who served as a member of the Washington House of Representatives for the 22nd legislative district. Prior to her election to the State House, Dolan worked as the policy director for Washington Governor Christine Gregoire and made two unsuccessful runs for a seat in the State Senate.

== Early life and education ==
Dolan was born in Washington and raised in Spokane, Washington. She earned a Bachelor's degree from the University of Washington, and a Masters and PhD from Gonzaga University.

== Career ==
After graduating from college, Dolan returned to Spokane and became an elementary school teacher. In 1986, Dolan became an Area Director (supervisor of school principals) of Spokane Public Schools. In 2004, Dolan retired from education and ran for the state senate in Eastern Washington. In 2005, Dolan became policy director to then-Governor Christine Gregoire. Dolan was elected to the Washington House of Representatives in 2017, succeeding Chris Reykdal, who was elected Washington Superintendent of Public Instruction.
