= Jan Shabro =

Washington State politician

Member of the Washington House of Representatives from the 31st district
- In office January 13, 2003 – January 8, 2007
- Preceded by: Christopher Hurst
- Succeeded by: Christopher Hurst

Personal details
- Born: 1940 (age 85–86) Washington, U.S.
- Party: Republican
- Education: Pacific Lutheran University (B.A., M.A.E.)
- Occupation: Teacher

Jan Shabro (born 1940) is a former American politician who served as a member of the Washington House of Representatives from 2003 to 2007. She represented Washington's 31st legislative district as a Republican. Before serving in the legislature, she was a member of the Pierce County Council from 1994 to 2002.
