= Sam Hunt (Washington politician) =

American politician and educator from Washington (1942–2026)

Samuel William Hunt

Member of the Washington Senate from the 22nd district
- In office January 9, 2017 – January 13, 2025
- Preceded by: Karen Fraser
- Succeeded by: Jessica Bateman

Member of the Washington House of Representatives from the 22nd district
- In office January 8, 2001 – January 9, 2017
- Preceded by: Cathy Wolfe
- Succeeded by: Beth Doglio

Personal details
- Born: Samuel William Hunt; December 9, 1942 Billings, Montana, U.S.
- Died: April 25, 2026 (aged 83) Olympia, Washington, U.S.
- Party: Democratic
- Spouse: Charlene Hunt (died 2017)
- Children: 2
- Education: Washington State University; University of Oregon
- Website: Official

Samuel William Hunt (December 9, 1942 – April 25, 2026) was an American politician and educator who served as a member of the Washington State legislature from 2001 to 2025. He served as a member of the Washington State House of Representatives between 2001 and 2016, and the Washington State Senate from 2017 to 2025. He represented the 22nd district.

== Early life and education ==
Hunt was born in Billings, Montana. After receiving a degree and teaching certificate from Washington State University, Hunt took post-graduate studies at Washington State University and the University of Oregon.

Hunt was an active member of the 4-H, and was named the 4-H Junior Poultryman of the Year for Washington State as a young man.

During his late college years, he traveled to Nepal as a 4-H International Farm Youth Exchange Student, where he lived for six months during his study abroad program.

== Career ==
Hunt began his career as a teacher in at Pasco High School. While in Pasco, he was elected to the Pasco City Council. In 1975, Hunt was hired by Sen. Warren G. Magnuson to serve as staff on the U.S. Senate Appropriations Committee in Washington D.C., primarily focused on handling education issues. He held this position for the remainder of Sen. Magnuson's service in the U.S. Senate.

In 1980, Hunt relocated to Washington state, where he worked for the Senate Democratic Caucus and later became Governor Booth Gardner's Special Assistant for K-12 Education.

Hunt made a short return to teaching in the Montesano School District in the late 1980s, before returning to work as legislative liaison for the Washington Department of Information Services. He was elected to the North Thurston School Board in 1994, and served from 1995 to 2003. He retired from state service in 2001 to run for the Washington State House of Representatives.

Hunt served as a member of the Washington House of Representatives from 2001 to 2017, and was succeeded by Beth Doglio. He was then elected to the Washington State Senate. He represented the 22nd District and served as the Chair of the State Government, Tribal Relations, and Elections Committee. Hunt also served on the Early Learning and K-12 Education Committee and the Ways & Means Committee. On February 20, 2024, Hunt announced he would retire after completing his term. In January 2025, Hunt was succeeded by House of Representatives member Jessica Bateman.

Following his retirement from the Senate, Hunt was named to the Washington State University Board of Regents, and remained a WSU Regent until his death in 2026.

== Personal life and death ==
Hunt was married for 47 years to Charlene Hunt who died in 2017. Hunt had two children and lived in Olympia, Washington, until the time of his death on April 25, 2026, at the age of 83.

Washington House of Representatives
Preceded by Cathy Wolfe	Member of the Washington House of Representatives from the 22nd district 2001–2017	Succeeded by Beth Doglio
