= Maia Bellon =

American attorney

Director of the Washington Department of Ecology
- In office February 2013 – 2020
- Governor: Jay Inslee
- Preceded by: Ted Sturdevant
- Succeeded by: Laura Watson

Personal details
- Born: Maia D. Bellon
- Education: Evergreen State College; Arizona State University
- Occupation: Lawyer

Maia D. Bellon is an American attorney and former government official from the State of Washington. She served as Director of the Washington Department of Ecology from 2013 to 2020. A member of the Mescalero Apache, Bellon was the first Native American to serve as a member of the Washington cabinet.

== Early life and education ==
Bellon's father, Richard Bellon, served as the executive director of the Chehalis Tribe. Her mother, Rio Lara-Bellon, was writer and teacher. Bellon's family lived below the poverty line, and, as such, outdoor activities were her family's main source of recreation growing up. Bellon cites her experience "romping around in the woods" and fishing as formative for her environmental advocacy.

Bellon received her undergraduate education from Evergreen State College in 1991. Her first political involvement was as an intern for Congresswoman Jolene Unsoeld of Washington's 3rd district. In 1994, Bellon graduated from Arizona State University Law School.

== Career ==
=== State government ===
Bellon served in the ecology office of the Washington Attorney General from 1994 to 2000. Bellon first joined the Department of Ecology in 2011, initially as the head of its water resources program. She was appointed Director of the Department of Ecology by newly-inaugurated Governor Jay Inslee in February 2013, succeeding former Director Ted Sturdevant. Her appointment made Bellon the first Native American to hold state cabinet office in Washington.

Upon taking office, commentators highlighted leaking radioactive waste at the Hanford Site as a key challenge facing the Department of Ecology. In 2019, Bellon wrote to the federal Department of Energy to voice her concern about the department's protocol for storing high-level radioactive waste (HLW). As Director, Bellon pushed for stronger water quality standards.

As Director of the Department of Ecology, Bellon testified before Congress against the Trump Administration's proposed changes to the Clean Water Act. Under Bellon's leadership, the Department of Ecology denied a permit for a proposal to build what would've been the largest coal export terminal in North America. Bellon described the proposed project as one with "too many unavoidable and negative environmental impacts for the project to move forward".

In her role, Bellon was also responsible for overseeing the development of proposed marsh buffers. Bellon reportedly helped convince Governor Inslee to enact the Yakima Basin Integrated Plan for water conservation.

== Post-government ==
Bellon announced her resignation in December 2019, and was succeeded in her position by Laura Watson, an Assistant Washington Attorney General. After leaving office, Bellon returned to private practice as an environmental lawyer at Cascadia Law Group. In this role, Bellon has advocated for the federal government to uphold its promises in the 1854 Treaty of Medicine Creek.

Bellon co-wrote an article on Earth Day 2021 for The Seattle Times where she called for "build[ing] intersectional climate and environmental solutions that center our most impacted neighbors while energizing our communities and economies."

== Personal life ==
Bellon is married to Bill S. Kallappa II, a member of the Washington State Board of Education and an enrolled member of the Makah Tribe. The two reside in Tumwater, Washington.
