= Denny Heck =

American politician (born 1952)

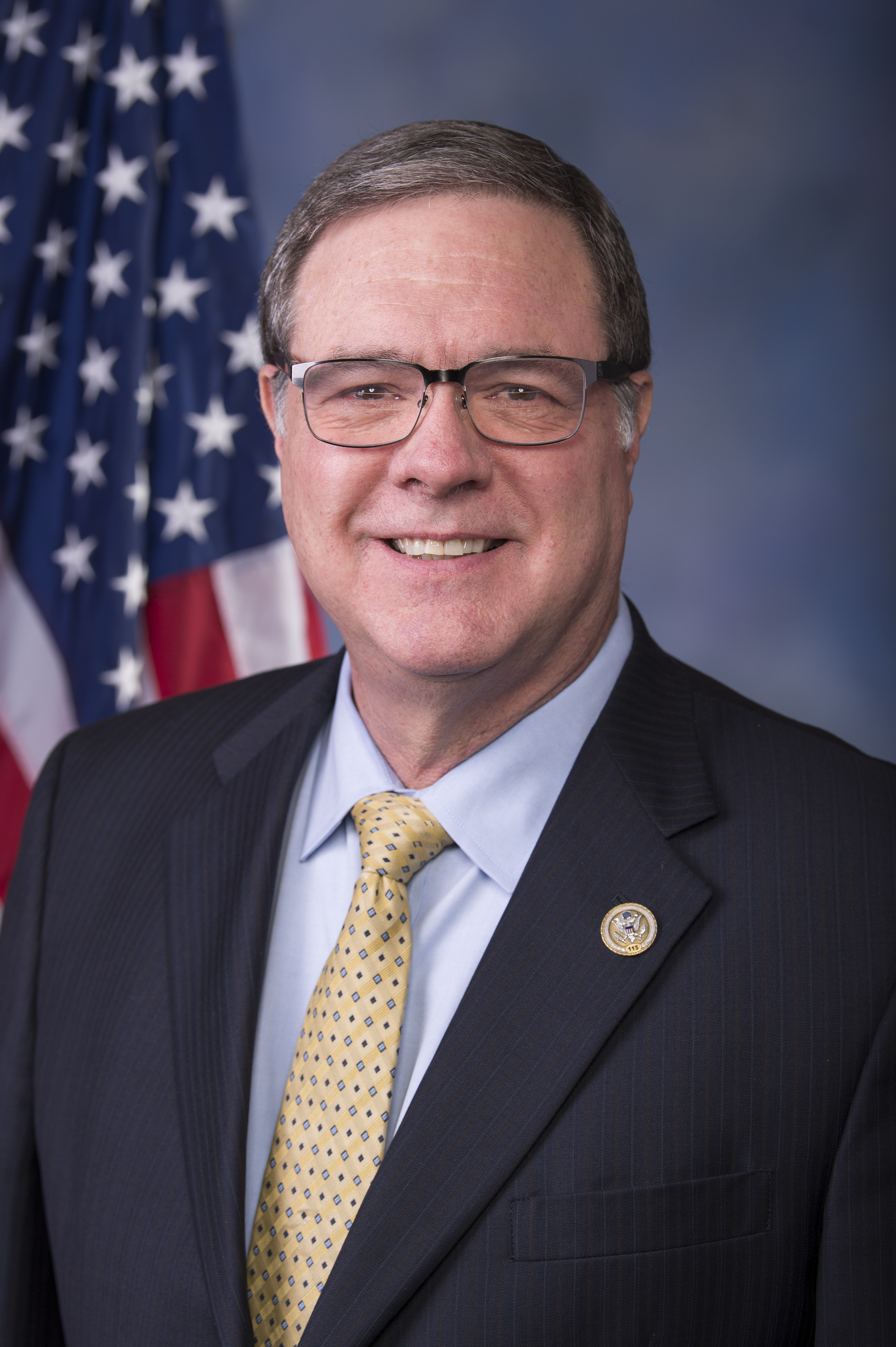
- Official portrait, 2017

17th Lieutenant Governor of Washington
- Incumbent
- Assumed office January 13, 2021
- Governor: Jay Inslee; Bob Ferguson
- Preceded by: Cyrus Habib

Member of the U.S. House of Representatives from Washington's 10th district
- In office January 3, 2013 – January 3, 2021
- Preceded by: Constituency established
- Succeeded by: Marilyn Strickland

Majority Leader of the Washington House of Representatives
- In office January 10, 1983 – January 14, 1985
- Preceded by: Gary A. Nelson
- Succeeded by: Joseph E. King

Member of the Washington House of Representatives from the 17th district
- In office January 10, 1977 – January 14, 1985
- Preceded by: Eugene Laughlin
- Succeeded by: Kim Peery

Personal details
- Born: Dennis Lynn Heck; July 29, 1952 (age 74) Vancouver, Washington, U.S.
- Party: Democratic
- Spouse: Paula Fruci (m. 1976)
- Children: 2
- Education: United States Military Academy (attended); Evergreen State College (BA); Portland State University (attended)

Dennis Lynn Heck (born July 29, 1952) is an American politician serving as the 17th lieutenant governor of Washington, since 2021. A member of the Democratic Party, he served as the U.S. representative for Washington's 10th congressional district from 2013 to 2021 and as a state representative from 1977 to 1985.

In 2010, Heck was the Democratic nominee for the 3rd congressional district, but was defeated by Republican Jaime Herrera Beutler. Following redistricting, Washington added a tenth congressional district in which Heck lived representing parts of Mason, Pierce, and Thurston counties. He won that seat in 2012, serving from 2013 until 2021. In 2020, he was elected Lieutenant Governor of Washington. He won election to a second term in 2024.

== Early life and education ==
Heck was born in Vancouver, Washington in 1952 and raised in the Lake Shore area of Clark County. One day his father did not come back home so Heck's mother took him and his older brother and borrowed money to take a bus back to Vancouver to get back her old job as a telephone operator. Heck's mother divorced his father and later married a Teamster truck driver, Vic Heck, who provided him and his family a better life. Heck's stepfather later adopted him and his brother Bob. Heck graduated from Columbia River High School in 1970 and accepted an appointment to the United States Military Academy at West Point, which he attended briefly before enrolling in and later graduating from Evergreen State College in Olympia in 1973. He also attended graduate school at Portland State University from 1974 to 1975.

== Early career ==
=== Washington House of Representatives ===
Starting in 1976, Heck was elected to five terms in the Washington House of Representatives, representing the 17th legislative district in Clark, Skamania, and Klickitat counties. During that time he was elected House Majority Leader, the second-ranking position in the House. He also co-chaired the Education Committee and wrote the state's historic Basic Education Act.

Following his service in the state house, Heck served a term as chief clerk of the House and then as served as chief of staff for Governor Booth Gardner during his second term (1989–1993).

=== Private sector ===
Upon Governor Gardner's retirement in 1995, Heck and a friend and colleague, Stan Marshburn, co-founded TVW, a nonprofit statewide public affairs network for Washington State patterned after C-SPAN. TVW provides coverage of the Washington State Legislature and sessions of the Washington Supreme Court.

Heck was the co-founder with Christopher Hedrick of Intrepid Learning Solutions. He served as a board director of the company from 1999 until 2012. The company specialized in business oriented education and training programs. He helped found Digital Efficiency, which specialized in aiding businesses and medical facilities in transitioning toward an all-digital format.

In 2003, Heck concentrated on helping to build a for-profit company he had founded specializing in business oriented education and training programs. Heck served as the host for the TVW public affairs show Inside Olympia in the late 1990s and early 2000s.

== U.S. House of Representatives (2013–2021) ==
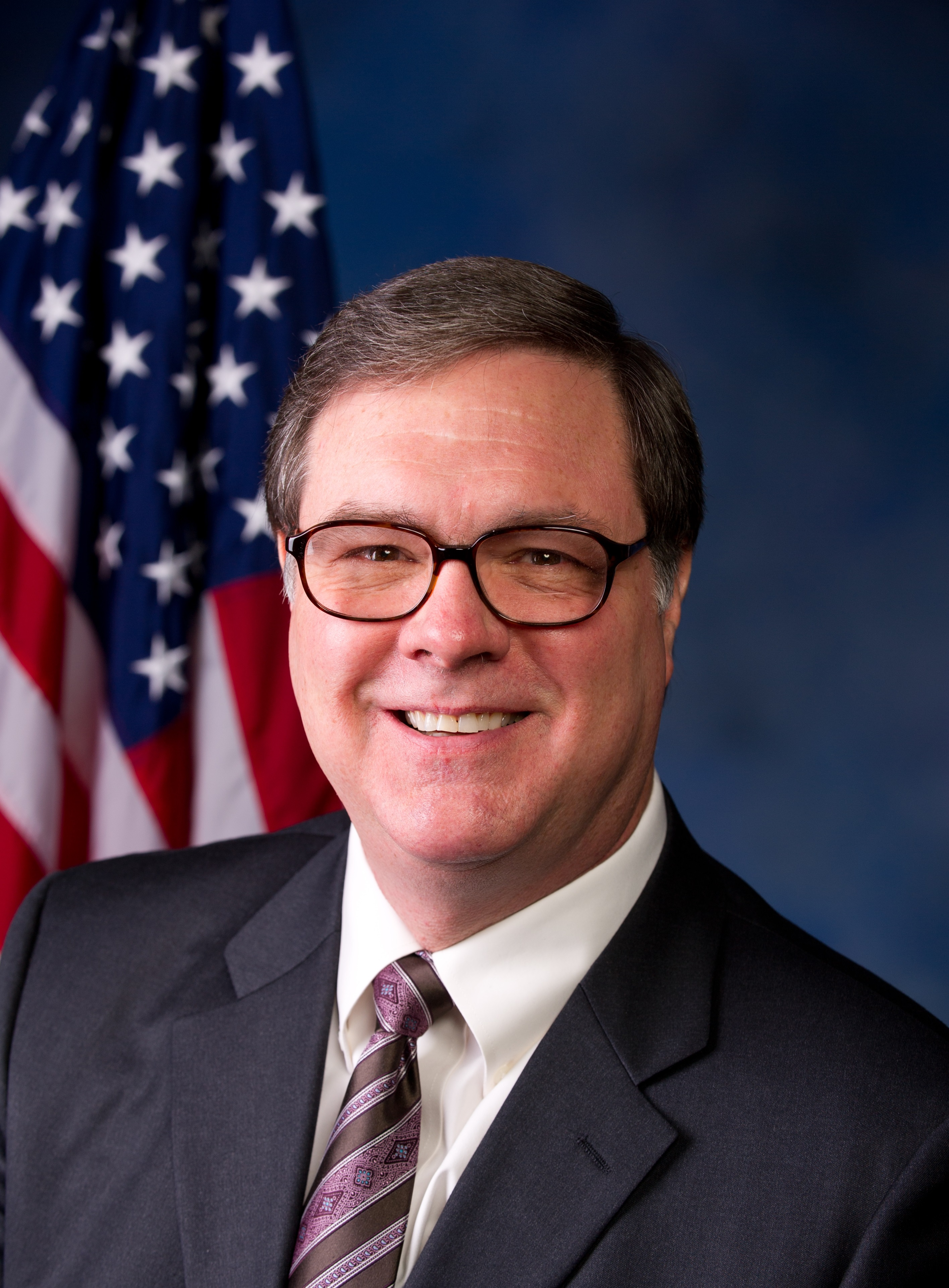
Heck's freshman portrait (113th Congress)

=== Elections ===
2010

In early 2010, Heck announced his candidacy to replace the retiring Democratic incumbent Brian Baird. He won the primary with 31% of the vote and faced runner-up Republican Jaime Herrera, who won 28% of the vote.

Heck was endorsed by the Seattle Post-Intelligencer on October 12, 2010. Heck lost to Herrera in the general election, 47% to 53%.

2012

Heck indicated in the spring of 2011 that he would run for Congress again in 2012. Soon after the state's redistricting commission announced tentative maps, Heck announced that he was running for the newly created 10th district. In the general election on November 6, 2012, Heck defeated Republican challenger Dick Muri to become the district's first congressman.

2014

Heck won with 54.7% of the vote over Republican Joyce McDonald.

2016

Heck won with 58.7% of the vote over Republican Jim Postma.

2018

Heck won with 61.5% of the vote over Republican Joseph Brumbles.

=== Committee assignments ===
- House Permanent Select Committee on Intelligence
  - Subcommittee on Defense Intelligence and Warfighter Support
  - Subcommittee on Strategic Technologies and Advanced Research
- Committee on Financial Services
  - Subcommittee on Financial Institutions and Consumer Credit
  - Subcommittee on Oversight and Investigations

=== Caucus memberships ===
- New Democrat Coalition
- Congressional Arts Caucus
- U.S.-Japan Caucus

=== Secure and Fair Enforcement Banking Act ===
Since 2013, Heck and Representative Ed Perlmutter have introduced legislation to improve access to banking and financial services for cannabis businesses. Initially known as the Marijuana Business Access to Banking Act, it was rebranded as the Secure and Fair Enforcement (SAFE) Banking Act in 2017. On September 25, 2019, the House of Representatives passed the SAFE Banking Act by a 321–103 margin, marking the first time that a standalone cannabis reform bill had passed either chamber of Congress.

== Lieutenant Governor of Washington (2021–present) ==
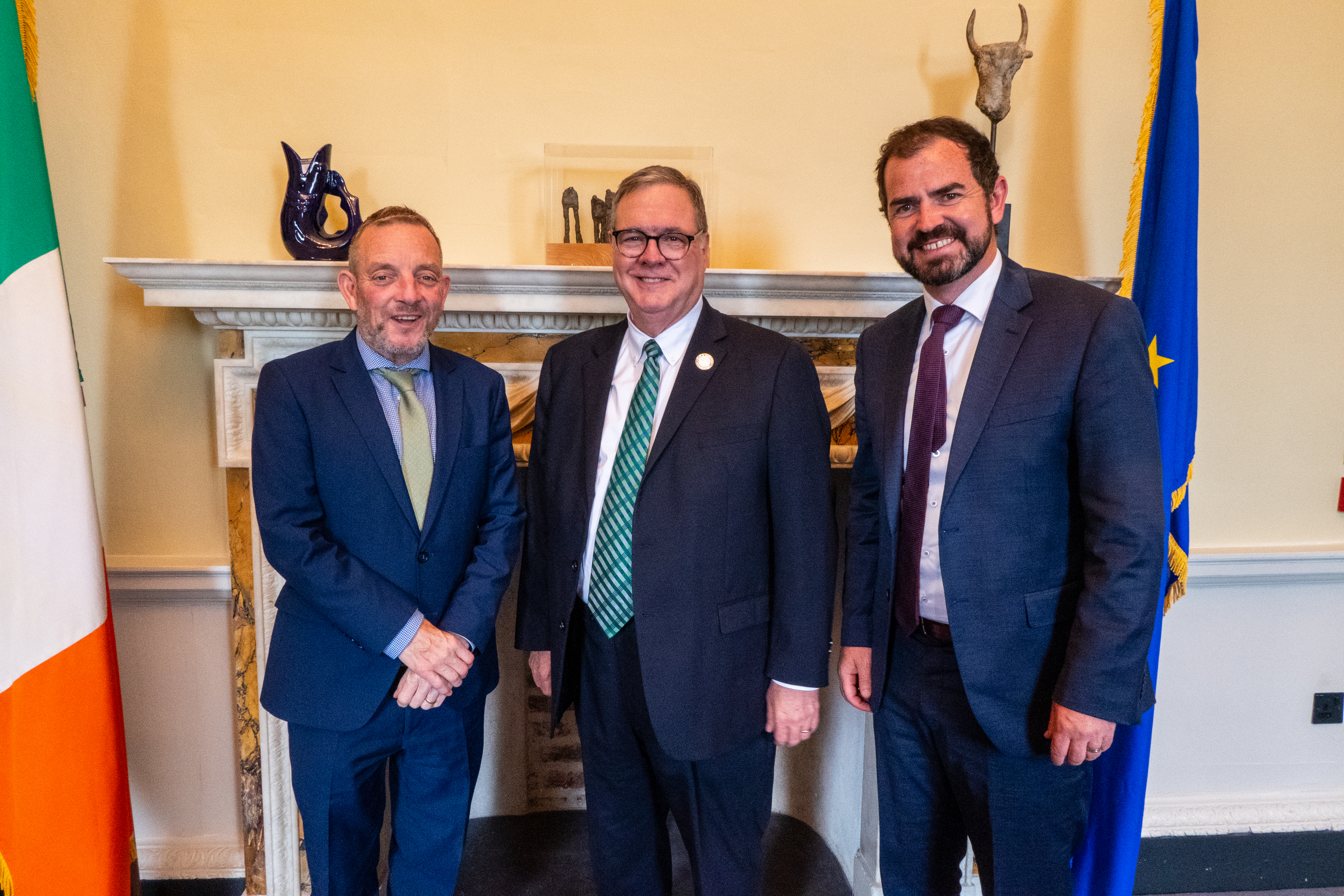
Heck (center) with Irish politician Jerry Buttimer and consul-general Micheál Smith in 2024.

On December 4, 2019, Heck announced that he would not seek reelection to Congress in 2020. On April 3, 2020, he filed to run for lieutenant governor. He defeated Marko Liias in the 2020 general election.

In May 2023, Heck revealed plans to seek reelection. In the nonpartisan primary in August 2024 he led, with 48.6% of the vote, Republican challengers Dan Matthews (23.0%) and Bob Hagglund (16.7%). The general election saw Heck win against Matthews by a margin of roughly 55.7% to 44.2%.

== Personal life ==
Heck and his wife Paula Fruci have been married since 1976 and have two sons.

In 2008, he wrote and performed a one-man play, Our Times, to several sold-out audiences. He and his wife, Paula, who directed the play, donated all proceeds to local charities.

Heck has supported numerous organizations within Washington, both actively and as a contributor. He has served on the board of trustees for The Evergreen State College, the board for the Washington State History Museum., was a member of the Steering Committee for the Washington Learns Commission; a long-term strategy to improve the education system of Washington.

Heck is the author of Challenges and Opportunities: The Transformation of Washington's Schools, published in 1987, Lucky Bounce, published in 2015, a novel titled The Enemy You Know, published in 2018, and Sausage, marketed as an unvarnished behind-the-scenes look at his time in Congress, published in 2022.

== Electoral history ==
=== State legislature ===
District #17 state representative #1 election results
Year	Democrat			Republican		
Year	Candidate	Votes	%	Candidate	Votes	%
1976	Dennis L. Heck	17,998	59.15%	Eddie McAninch	12,428	40.85%
1978	Dennis L. Heck	16,486	69.37%	David H. Miller	7,278	30.63%
1980	Dennis L. Heck	28,302	71.64%	Elizabeth G. Spires	11,202	28.36%
1982	Dennis L. Heck	15,080	64.48%	Suzanne Taylor-Moore	8,308	35.52%
1984	Dennis L. Heck	21,130	66.50%	Steve Moore	10,645	33.50%

=== Lieutenant governor ===
Lieutenant governor election results
Year	Heck			Opponent		
Year	Candidate	Votes	%	Candidate	Votes	%
2020	Dennis L. Heck (D)	1,658,405	45.61%	Marko Liias (D)	1,218,548	33.51%
2024	Dennis L. Heck (D)	2,112,132	55.72%	Dan Matthews (R)	1,674,025	44.16%

== Works ==
- Challenges and Opportunities: The Transformation of Washington's Schools, Advance Washington (1987)
- Lucky Bounce, self-published via Amazon Kindle (2015)
- The Enemy You Know, self-published via Xlibris (2018)
- Sausage, self-published via Amazon Kindle (2022)

Washington House of Representatives
Preceded by Gary A. Nelson	Majority Leader of the Washington House of Representatives; 1983–1985	Succeeded by Joseph E. King
U.S. House of Representatives
New constituency	Member of the U.S. House of Representatives from Washington's 10th congressional district 2013–2021	Succeeded by Marilyn Strickland
Political offices
Preceded by Cyrus Habib	Lieutenant Governor of Washington; 2021–present	Incumbent
U.S. order of precedence (ceremonial)
Preceded by Ken Buck as Former U.S. Representative	Order of precedence of the United States as Former U.S. Representative	Succeeded by Raul Labrador as Former U.S. Representative
