= Washington State Public Disclosure Commission =

Washington state government agency

Agency overview
- Website: www.pdc.wa.gov

The Washington State Public Disclosure Commission (PDC) is an agency of the Washington state government that regulates candidates, campaigns and lobbyists. It enforces the state's disclosure and campaign finances laws, and provides public access to information about lobbying activities, the financial affairs of elected and appointed public officials, and campaign contributions and expenditures.

Voters authorized the creation of the PDC in 1972 with the passage of Initiative 276, which declared that "The public's right to know of the financing of political campaigns and lobbying and the financial affairs of elected officials and candidates far outweighs any right that these matters remain secret and private." Opponents called I-276 "well-intentioned but certainly over-enthusiastic legislation," and contended it would violate the privacy of campaign donors and discourage participation in the political process.

Despite those concerns, the ballot measure was approved by 72% of the vote and became effective January 1, 1973. The laws governing the PDC are found in the Revised Code of Washington, Title 42, Chapter 17a.

The main function of the law is to require financial disclosures about political campaigns and lobbying contributions and expenditures. Some provisions go beyond disclosure to regulate conduct, such as a prohibition against use of public facilities in electoral politics. The campaign finance regulations do not apply to those seeking federal elective office, precinct committee office, or offices in some of the state's smallest political subdivisions.

In 1992, voters expanded campaign finance restrictions by overwhelmingly approving Initiative 134. The initiative set limits on contributions to state executive and legislative candidates, political parties, and legislative caucuses.

The five-member Public Disclosure Commission administers and enforces the Campaign Disclosure and Contribution Act. It meets, usually in Olympia, on the fourth Thursday of each month, except during November and December, when a combined meeting is scheduled for the first or second week of December.

The current chair of the commission is Fred Jarrett. Commission members are appointed by the Governor and confirmed by the Senate. Each member serves a single five-year term. No more than three members may be from the same political party, and none of the members may be involved in electoral politics.

The commission is a quasi-judicial body that hears cases that allege violations of these campaign finance and disclosure laws. It may assess penalties of up to $10,000 per violation, unless the parties stipulate otherwise. The commission also appoints an executive director who oversees a staff that is focused on assisting individuals with compliance, providing easy public access to data, and referring possible violations to the commission for enforcement. The agency has an annual budget of more than $5 million and the equivalent of 31 full-time employees.

== See also ==
- Rickert v. Pub. Disclosure Comm'n
