= 2000 Washington Public Lands Commissioner election =

- November 7, 2000

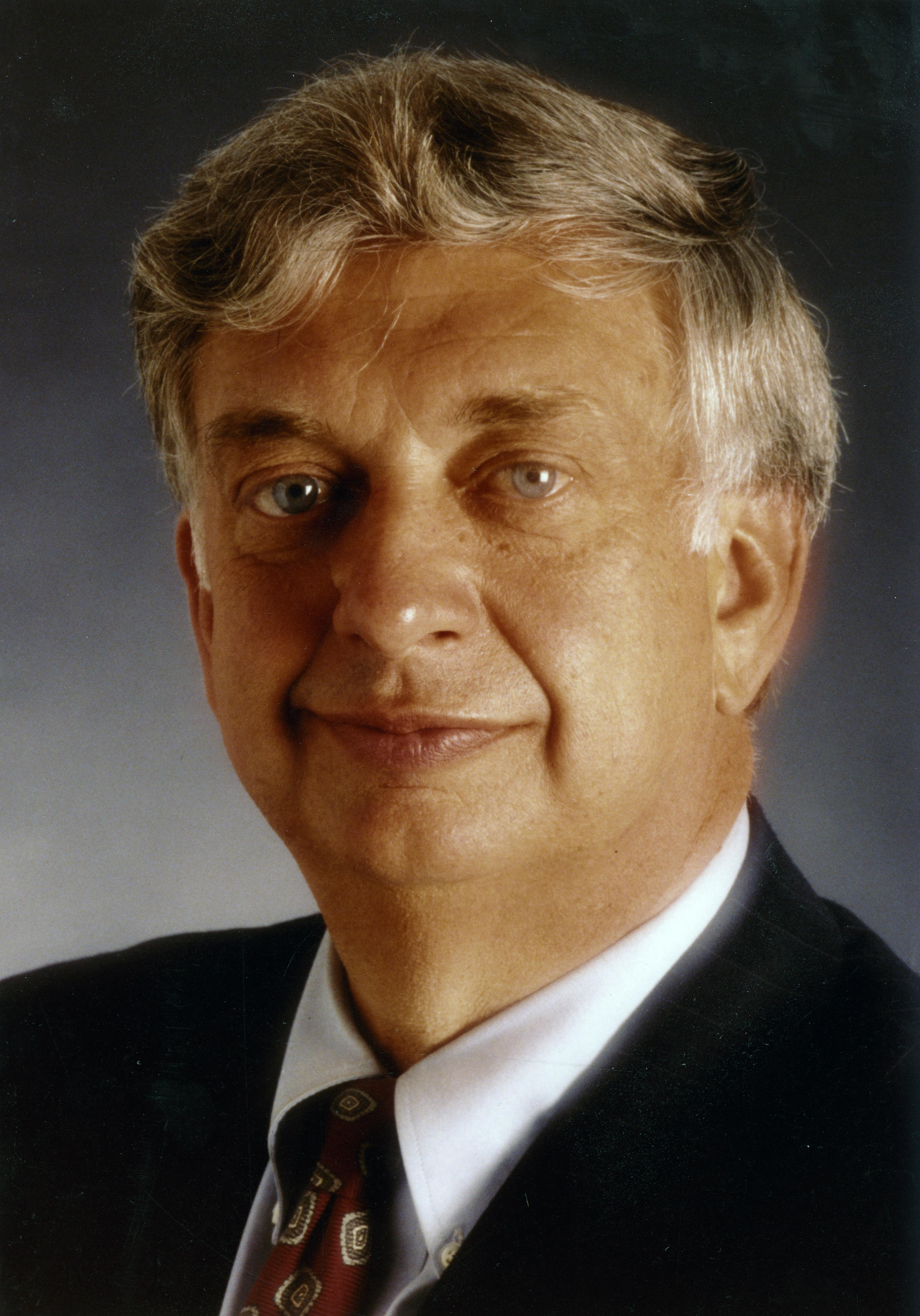

Candidate	Doug Sutherland	Mike Lowry	Steve Layman
Party	Republican	Democratic	Libertarian
Popular vote	1,154,048	1,052,366	125,985
Percentage	49.48%	45.12%	5.40%
- Sutherland: 40–50% 50–60% 60–70% Lowry: 40–50% 50–60%
Public Lands Commissioner before election
Jennifer Belcher
Democratic
Elected Public Lands Commissioner
Doug Sutherland
Republican

The 2000 Washington Public Lands Commissioner election was held on November 7, 2000, to elect the Washington Public Lands Commissioner, concurrently with the 2000 U.S. presidential election, as well as elections to the U.S. Senate and various state and local elections, including for U.S. House and governor of Washington.

Two-term incumbent Democratic Public Lands Commissioner Jennifer Belcher initially ran for re-election to a third term in office but ultimately decided to retire. Republican Pierce County Executive Doug Sutherland defeated Democratic former Governor Mike Lowry to succeed Belcher.

== Candidates ==
=== Republican Party ===
==== Advanced to general ====
- Doug Sutherland, Pierce County Executive (1993–2001)

==== Eliminated in primary ====
- Patrick A. Parrish

==== Withdrew ====
- Bruce Mackey

=== Democratic Party ===
==== Advanced to general ====
- Mike Lowry, former governor of Washington (1993–1997)

==== Eliminated in primary ====
- Georgia Gardner, state senator (1998–2003)
- Mike the Mover, perennial candidate
- Jim O'Donnell
- Bob Penhale
- Tim Reid

==== Withdrew ====
- Jennifer Belcher, incumbent public lands commissioner (1993–2001)

=== Libertarian Party ===
==== Advanced to general ====
- Steve Layman

== Primary election ==
The blanket primary was held on September 19.

=== Results ===
Blanket primary results
Party	Candidate	Votes	%
Republican	Doug Sutherland	391,558	32.99
Democratic	Mike Lowry	346,197	29.17
Democratic	Georgia Gardner	142,795	12.03
Republican	Patrick A. Parrish	92,191	7.77
Democratic	Jim O'Donnell	76,022	6.41
Democratic	Tim Reid	48,317	4.07
Libertarian	Steve Layman	39,786	3.35
Democratic	Mike the Mover	34,168	2.88
Democratic	Bob Penhale	15,862	1.34
Total votes		1,186,896	100.00

== General election ==
=== Endorsements ===
Doug Sutherland (R)

State senators

- Tim Sheldon, LD-35 (1997–2023) (Democratic)

Newspapers

- The Seattle Times

=== Results ===
2000 Washington Public Lands Commissioner election
Party	Candidate	Votes	%	±%
Republican	Doug Sutherland	1,154,048	49.48	+4.85
Democratic	Mike Lowry	1,052,366	45.12	–7.03
Libertarian	Steve Layman	125,985	5.40	N/A
Total votes		2,332,399	100.00	N/A
Republican gain from Democratic				

==== By county ====
County	Mike Lowry Democratic		Doug Sutherland Republican		Steve Layman Libertarian		Margin		Total
County	#	%	#	%	#	%	#	%	Total
Adams	1,504	31.77%	3,067	64.79%	163	3.44%	1,563	33.02%	4,734
Asotin	3,445	46.12%	3,665	49.06%	360	4.82%	220	2.95%	7,470
Benton	17,945	32.10%	35,622	63.72%	2,334	4.18%	17,677	31.62%	55,901
Chelan	7,529	30.08%	16,271	65.01%	1,227	4.90%	8,742	34.93%	25,027
Clallam	10,503	35.00%	17,489	58.28%	2,018	6.72%	6,986	23.28%	30,010
Clark	52,745	42.00%	65,815	52.40%	7,035	5.60%	13,070	10.41%	125,595
Columbia	543	27.44%	1,374	69.43%	62	3.13%	831	41.99%	1,979
Cowlitz	14,606	42.07%	18,103	52.14%	2,012	5.79%	3,497	10.07%	34,721
Douglas	3,525	28.72%	8,124	66.19%	624	5.08%	4,599	37.47%	12,273
Ferry	937	32.17%	1,784	61.24%	192	6.59%	847	29.08%	2,913
Franklin	4,616	35.34%	7,928	60.70%	518	3.97%	3,312	25.36%	13,062
Garfield	411	33.12%	786	63.34%	44	3.55%	375	30.22%	1,241
Grant	7,410	32.49%	14,210	62.30%	1,188	5.21%	6,800	29.81%	22,808
Grays Harbor	10,362	41.30%	13,336	53.15%	1,391	5.54%	2,974	11.85%	25,089
Island	12,757	41.25%	16,367	52.92%	1,802	5.83%	3,610	11.67%	30,926
Jefferson	7,295	48.51%	6,850	45.55%	892	5.93%	-445	-2.96%	15,037
King	395,988	54.20%	297,596	40.73%	37,078	5.07%	-98,392	-13.47%	730,662
Kitsap	42,695	43.42%	50,012	50.86%	5,629	5.72%	7,317	7.44%	98,336
Kittitas	4,986	37.17%	7,704	57.43%	724	5.40%	2,718	20.26%	13,414
Klickitat	2,915	38.39%	4,212	55.47%	466	6.14%	1,297	17.08%	7,593
Lewis	7,822	27.23%	19,235	66.97%	1,664	5.79%	11,413	39.74%	28,721
Lincoln	1,507	30.64%	3,206	65.18%	206	4.19%	1,699	34.54%	4,919
Mason	8,419	39.47%	11,508	53.95%	1,403	6.58%	3,089	14.48%	21,330
Okanogan	4,380	31.44%	8,745	62.76%	808	5.80%	4,365	31.33%	13,933
Pacific	3,937	44.21%	4,541	50.99%	427	4.80%	604	6.78%	8,905
Pend Oreille	1,853	35.86%	2,916	56.44%	398	7.70%	1,063	20.57%	5,167
Pierce	108,201	42.04%	134,340	52.20%	14,831	5.76%	26,139	10.16%	257,372
San Juan	4,068	52.05%	3,213	41.11%	535	6.84%	-855	-10.94%	7,816
Skagit	17,137	39.85%	23,647	54.99%	2,221	5.16%	6,510	15.14%	43,005
Skamania	1,535	38.55%	2,063	51.81%	384	9.64%	528	13.26%	3,982
Snohomish	108,434	45.48%	116,384	48.82%	13,582	5.70%	7,950	3.33%	238,400
Spokane	70,854	43.95%	82,721	51.31%	7,647	4.74%	11,867	7.36%	161,222
Stevens	5,695	33.16%	10,419	60.66%	1,062	6.18%	4,724	27.50%	17,176
Thurston	38,561	42.50%	46,459	51.21%	5,711	6.29%	7,898	8.70%	90,731
Wahkiakum	602	32.74%	1,153	62.70%	84	4.57%	551	29.96%	1,839
Walla Walla	7,215	35.71%	12,109	59.93%	882	4.37%	4,894	24.22%	20,206
Whatcom	29,220	42.69%	35,307	51.58%	3,925	5.73%	6,087	8.89%	68,452
Whitman	6,665	44.17%	7,815	51.79%	611	4.05%	1,150	7.62%	15,091
Yakima	23,544	36.03%	37,952	58.08%	3,845	5.88%	14,408	22.05%	65,341
Totals	1,052,366	45.12%	1,154,048	49.48%	125,985	5.40%	101,682	4.36%	2,332,399

Counties that flipped from Democratic to Republican

- Cowlitz (largest city: Longview)
- Grays Harbor (largest city: Aberdeen)
- Kitsap (largest city: Bremerton)
- Mason (largest city: Shelton)
- Pacific (largest city: Raymond)
- Pierce (largest city: Tacoma)
- Skagit (largest city: Mount Vernon)
- Snohomish (largest city: Everett)
- Thurston (largest city: Lacey)
- Whatcom (largest city: Bellingham)
