= Northwest News Network =

The Northwest News Network is a network of radio stations based in the Pacific Northwest region of the United States. It has 61 member stations in the states of Idaho, Oregon, and Washington. The network was founded in 2003 and has been headquartered in Portland, Oregon, since 2008.

== Members ==
=== Partner stations ===
- Coast Community Radio (Astoria, Oregon)
- Jefferson Public Radio (Ashland, Oregon)
- KBCS (Bellevue, Washington)
- KLCC (Eugene, Oregon)
- KNKX (Tacoma, Washington)
- KSVR (Mount Vernon, Washington)
- KUOW (Seattle, Washington)
- KWSO (Warm Springs, Oregon)
- Northwest Public Radio
- Oregon Public Broadcasting
- Spokane Public Radio
