= 2002 United States House of Representatives elections in Washington =

- November 5, 2002

All 9 Washington seats to the United States House of Representatives
	Majority party	Minority party
Party	Democratic	Republican
Last election	6	3
Seats won	6	3
Seat change	Steady	Steady
Popular vote	907,440	778,922
Percentage	52.18%	44.79%
Swing	▼3.34%	▲0.32%

Democratic
40–50%
50–60%
60–70%
70–80%
Republican
50–60%
60–70%
70–80%

The 2002 House elections in Washington occurred on November 5, 2002 to elect the members of the State of Washington's delegation to the United States House of Representatives. Washington has nine seats in the House, apportioned according to the 2000 United States census. Though competitive races occurred in several districts, no seat switched hands as a result of the elections this year.

== Overview ==
United States House of Representatives elections in Washington, 2002
Party	Votes	Percentage	Seats	+/–
Democratic	907,440	52.18%	6	—
Republican	778,922	44.79%	3	—
Independents	52,754	3.03%	0	—
Totals	1,739,116	100.00%	9	—

== District 1 ==
2002 Washington's 1st congressional district election
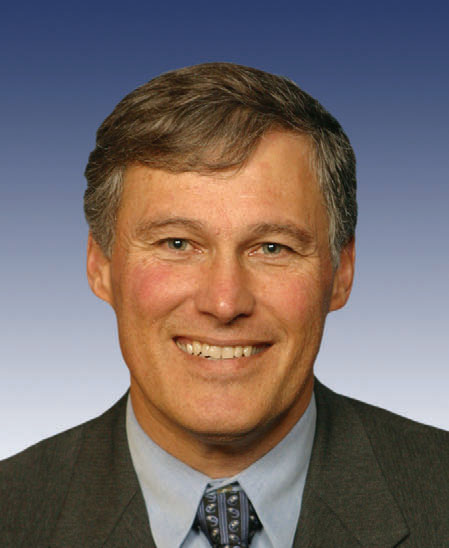

Nominee	Jay Inslee	Joe Marine
Party	Democratic	Republican
Popular vote	114,087	84,696
Percentage	55.6%	41.3%
- County results Inslee: 50–60%
U.S. Representative before election
Jay Inslee
Democratic
Elected U.S. Representative
Jay Inslee
Democratic

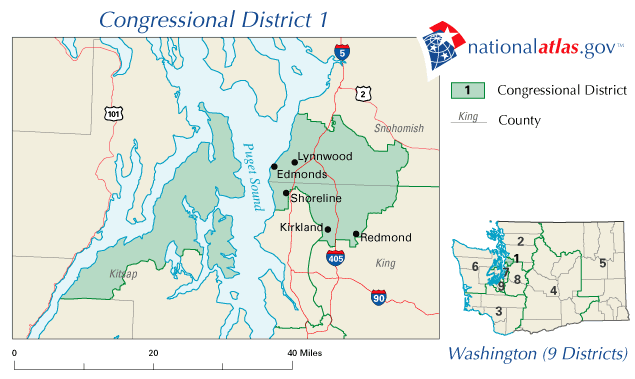

Incumbent Democratic Congressman Jay Inslee ran for a fourth nonconsecutive term in Congress from this fairly liberal district rooted in portions of the Kitsap Peninsula and Seattle’s northern suburbs. Inslee faced Republican candidate Joe Marine, a former Mukilteo City Councilman and State Representative. Though Marine gave Inslee one of the closest races of his career, the Congressman was successful on election day and bested Marine by a fourteen-point margin.

=== Predictions ===
Source	Ranking	As of
Sabato's Crystal Ball	Safe D	November 4, 2002
New York Times	Safe D	October 14, 2002

=== Results ===
2002 Washington's 1st congressional district election
Party	Candidate	Votes	%
Democratic	Jay Inslee (inc.)	114,087	55.64
Republican	Joe Marine	84,696	41.31
Libertarian	Mark B. Wilson	6,251	3.05
Total votes		205,034	100.00
Democratic hold			

==== By county ====
County results
County	Jay Inslee Democratic		Joe Marine Republican		Mark B. Wilson Libertarian		Margin		Total votes
County	#	%	#	%	#	%	#	%	Total votes
King (part)	43,854	57.50%	30,255	39.67%	2,157	2.83%	13,599	17.83%	76,266
Kitsap (part)	22,742	57.55%	15,509	39.24%	1,268	3.21%	7,233	18.30%	39,519
Snohomish (part)	47,491	53.21%	38,932	43.62%	2,826	3.17%	8,559	9.59%	89,249
Totals	114,087	55.64%	84,696	41.31%	6,251	3.05%	29,391	14.33%	205,034

== District 2 ==
2002 Washington's 2nd congressional district election

Nominee	Rick Larsen	Norma Smith
Party	Democratic	Republican
Popular vote	101,219	92,528
Percentage	50.1%	45.8%
- County results Larsen: 40–50% 50–60% Smith: 50–60%
U.S. Representative before election
Rick Larsen
Democratic
Elected U.S. Representative
Rick Larsen
Democratic

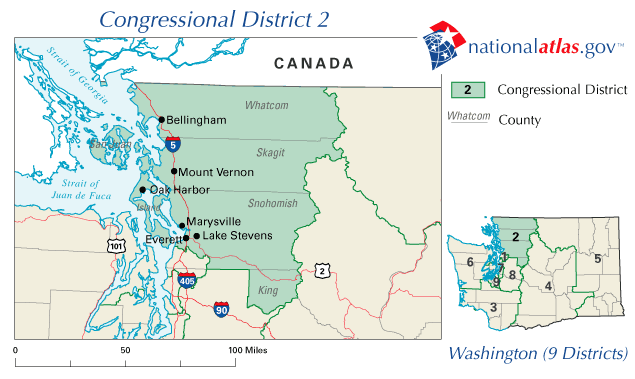

Freshman Democratic Congressman Rick Larsen, who represents this northwestern Washington-based district, ran for re-election. Larsen faced Republican Norma Smith, an aide to former Congressman Jack Metcalf and a former South Whidbey school board member in the general election. Though Larsen attained a majority of the vote and retained his seat, Smith was able to keep her Democratic opponent to only a four-point margin, surprisingly close in this marginally liberal district.

=== Predictions ===
Source	Ranking	As of
Sabato's Crystal Ball	Lean D	November 4, 2002
New York Times	Safe D	October 14, 2002

=== Results ===
2002 Washington's 2nd congressional district election
Party	Candidate	Votes	%
Democratic	Rick Larsen (inc.)	101,219	50.07
Republican	Norma Smith	92,528	45.77
Libertarian	Bruce Guthrie	4,326	2.14
Green	Bern Haggerty	4,077	2.02
Total votes		202,150	100.00
Democratic hold			

==== By county ====
County	Rick Larsen Democratic		Norma Smith Republican		Various candidates Other parties		Margin		Total votes cast
County	#	%	#	%	#	%	#	%	Total votes cast
Island	11,731	46.83%	12,580	50.22%	737	2.94%	-849	-3.39%	25,048
King (part)	114	56.72%	77	38.31%	10	4.98%	37	18.41%	201
San Juan	4,031	58.86%	2,371	34.62%	446	6.51%	1,660	24.24%	6,848
Skagit	16,233	49.52%	15,519	47.34%	1,029	3.14%	714	2.18%	32,781
Snohomish (part)	42,322	50.51%	38,250	45.65%	3,224	3.85%	4,072	4.86%	83,796
Whatcom	26,788	50.09%	23,731	44.38%	2,957	5.53%	3,057	5.72%	53,476
Totals	101,219	50.07%	92,528	45.77%	8,403	4.16%	8,691	4.30%	202,150

== District 3 ==
2002 Washington's 3rd congressional district election
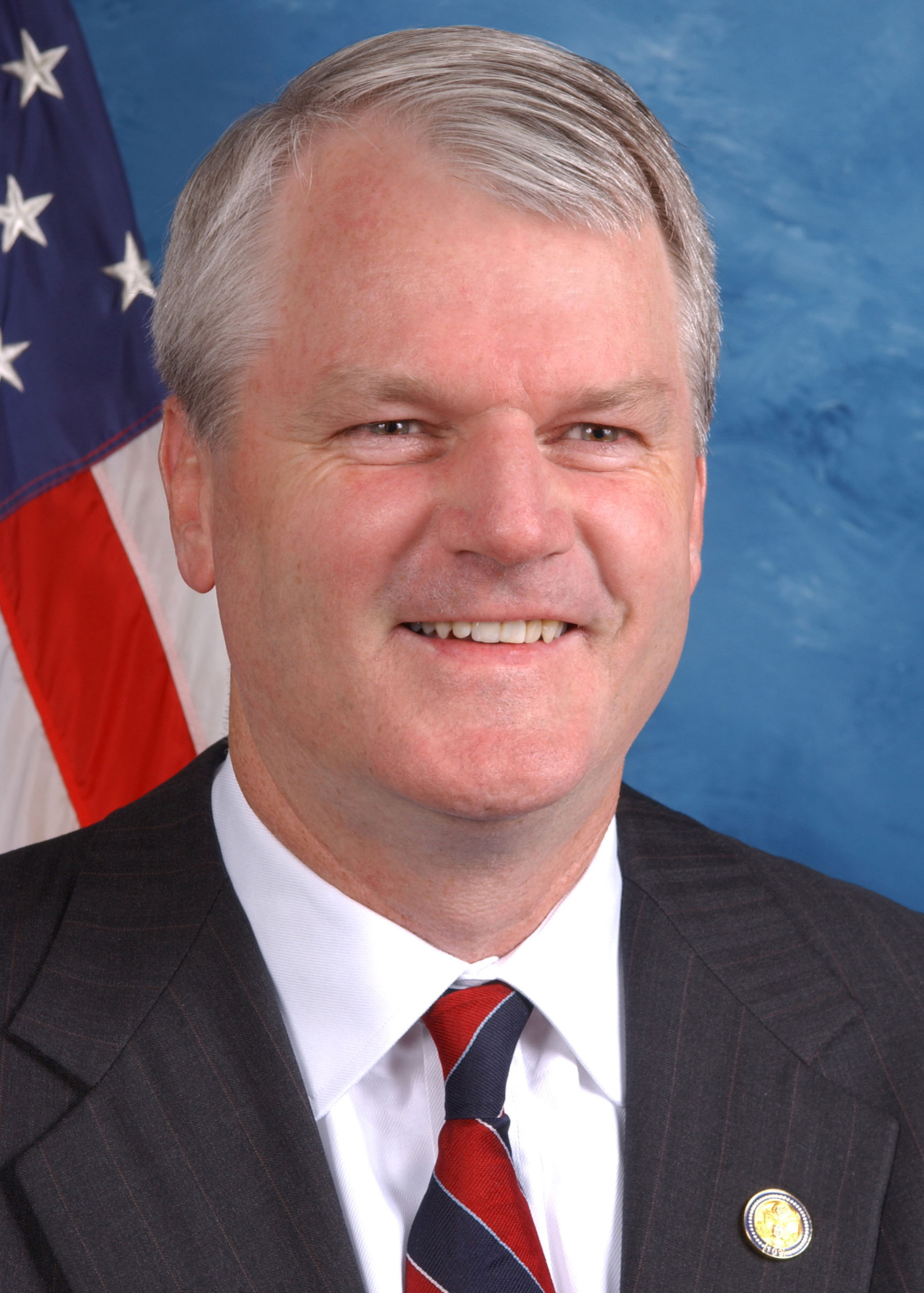

Nominee	Brian Baird	Joseph Zarelli
Party	Democratic	Republican
Popular vote	119,264	74,065
Percentage	61.69%	38.31%
- County results Baird: 50–60% 60–70% 70–80%
U.S. Representative before election
Brian Baird
Democratic
Elected U.S. Representative
Brian Baird
Democratic

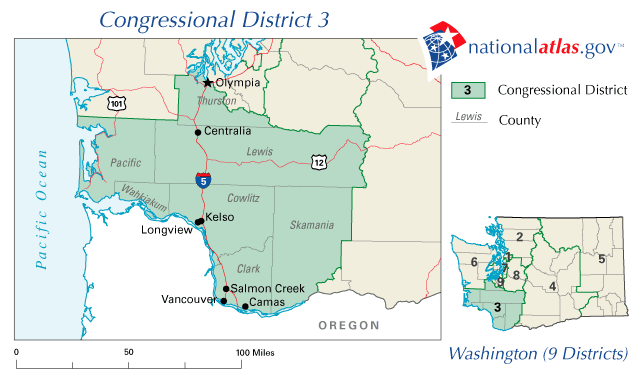

Though the southwestern Washington-based district that two-term Democratic incumbent Congressman Brian Baird represents is essentially a centrist district, the Congressman was able to perform surprisingly well against Republican State Senator Joseph Zarelli. Baird was overwhelmingly re-elected over Zarelli, receiving over sixty percent of the vote on election day.

=== Predictions ===
Source	Ranking	As of
Sabato's Crystal Ball	Safe D	November 4, 2002
New York Times	Safe D	October 14, 2002

=== Results ===
2002 Washington's 3rd congressional district election
Party	Candidate	Votes	%
Democratic	Brian Baird (inc.)	119,264	61.69
Republican	Joseph Zarelli	74,065	38.31
Total votes		193,329	100.00
Democratic hold			

==== By county ====
County results
County	Brian Baird Democratic		Joseph Zarelli Republican		Margin		Total votes
County	#	%	#	%	#	%	Total votes
Clark	53,573	59.30%	36,776	40.70%	16,797	18.59%	90,349
Cowlitz	17,682	66.17%	9,042	33.83%	8,640	32.33%	26,724
Lewis	11,378	50.14%	11,314	49.86%	64	0.28%	22,692
Pacific	5,283	70.57%	2,203	29.43%	3,080	41.14%	7,486
Skamania (part)	1,415	59.81%	951	40.19%	464	19.61%	2,366
Thurston (part)	28,657	68.40%	13,241	31.60%	15,416	36.79%	41,898
Wahkiakum	1,276	70.34%	538	29.66%	738	40.68%	1,814
Totals	119,264	61.69%	74,065	38.31%	45,199	23.38%	193,329

== District 4 ==
2002 Washington's 4th congressional district election
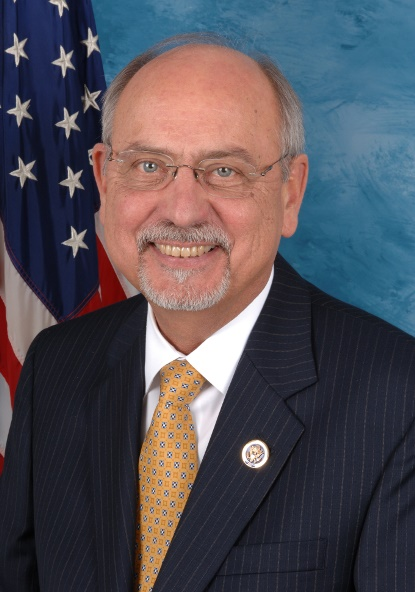

Nominee	Doc Hastings	Craig Mason
Party	Republican	Democratic
Popular vote	108,257	53,572
Percentage	66.9%	33.1%
- County results Hastings: 50–60% 60–70% 70–80%
U.S. Representative before election
Doc Hastings
Republican
Elected U.S. Representative
Doc Hastings
Republican

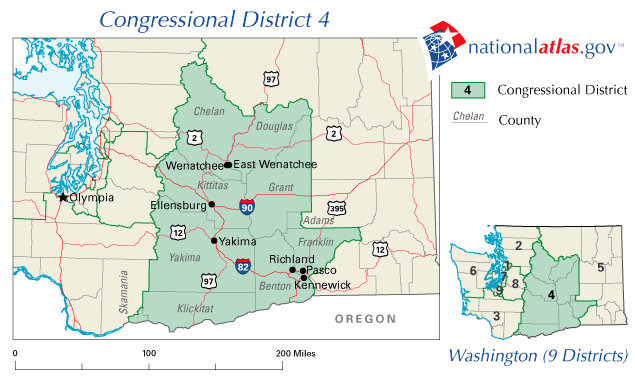

In this solidly conservative, central Washington congressional district, incumbent Republican Congressman Doc Hastings faced Democrat Craig Mason, a sociology professor at Columbia Basin College in the general election. Owing to Congressman Hastings’s popularity and his district’s strong proclivity towards electing Republican candidates, the Congressman was re-elected in a landslide.

=== Predictions ===
Source	Ranking	As of
Sabato's Crystal Ball	Safe R	November 4, 2002
New York Times	Safe R	October 14, 2002

=== Results ===
2002 Washington's 4th congressional district election
Party	Candidate	Votes	%
Republican	Doc Hastings (inc.)	108,257	66.90
Democratic	Craig Mason	53,572	33.10
Total votes		161,829	100.00
Republican hold			

==== By county ====
County results
County	Doc Hastings Republican		Craig Mason Democratic		Margin		Total votes
County	#	%	#	%	#	%	Total votes
Adams (part)	1,195	75.82%	381	24.18%	814	51.65%	1,576
Benton	27,779	69.31%	12,299	30.69%	15,480	38.62%	40,078
Chelan	13,313	67.70%	6,351	32.30%	6,962	35.40%	19,664
Douglas	6,213	70.34%	2,620	29.66%	3,593	40.68%	8,833
Franklin	6,839	69.38%	3,019	30.62%	3,820	38.75%	9,858
Grant	12,991	73.49%	4,687	26.51%	8,304	46.97%	17,678
Kittitas	6,086	62.05%	3,723	37.95%	2,363	24.09%	9,809
Klickitat	3,911	63.59%	2,239	36.41%	1,672	27.19%	6,150
Skamania (part)	459	50.77%	445	49.23%	14	1.55%	904
Yakima	29,471	62.33%	17,808	37.67%	11,663	24.67%	47,279
Totals	108,257	66.90%	53,572	33.10%	54,685	33.79%	161,829

== District 5 ==
2002 Washington's 5th congressional district election
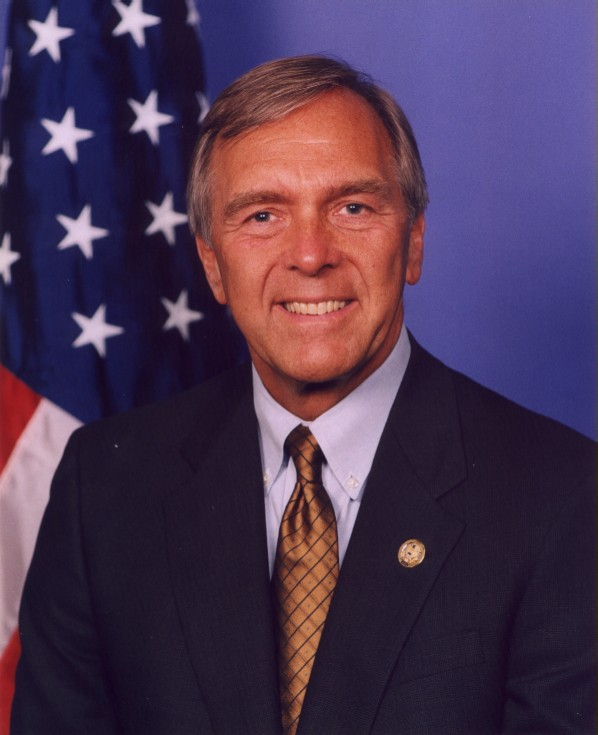

Nominee	George Nethercutt	Bart Haggin	Rob Chase
Party	Republican	Democratic	Libertarian
Popular vote	126,757	65,146	10,379
Percentage	62.7%	32.2%	5.1%
- County results Nethercutt: 60–70% 70–80% 80–90%
U.S. Representative before election
George Nethercutt
Republican
Elected U.S. Representative
George Nethercutt
Republican

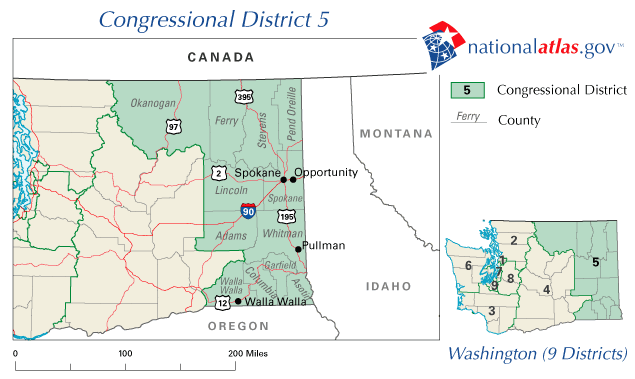

Running for his fifth term in Congress, incumbent Republican Congressman George Nethercutt faced Democratic candidate Bart Haggin and Libertarian candidate Rob Chase as obstacles to another term. In this staunchly conservative district rooted in the socially conservative counties of eastern Washington, Congressman Nethercutt hardly faced a challenge and easily won another term.

=== Predictions ===
Source	Ranking	As of
Sabato's Crystal Ball	Safe R	November 4, 2002
New York Times	Safe R	October 14, 2002

=== Results ===
2002 Washington's 5th congressional district election
Party	Candidate	Votes	%
Republican	George Nethercutt (inc.)	126,757	62.66
Democratic	Bart Haggin	65,146	32.21
Libertarian	Rob Chase	10,379	5.13
Total votes		202,282	100.00
Republican hold			

==== By county ====
County results
County	George Nethercutt Republican		Bart Haggin Democratic		Rob Chase Libertarian		Margin		Total votes
County	#	%	#	%	#	%	#	%	Total votes
Adams (part)	1,542	81.37%	285	15.03%	68	3.59%	1,257	66.33%	1,895
Asotin	3,643	60.45%	2,110	35.01%	273	4.53%	1,533	25.44%	6,026
Columbia	1,381	77.98%	331	18.69%	59	3.33%	1,050	59.29%	1,771
Ferry	1,802	68.13%	682	25.78%	161	6.09%	1,120	42.34%	2,645
Garfield	691	72.13%	223	23.28%	44	4.59%	468	48.85%	958
Lincoln	2,900	72.50%	949	23.73%	151	3.78%	1,951	48.78%	4,000
Okanogan	7,355	66.06%	3,050	27.40%	728	6.54%	4,305	38.67%	11,133
Pend Oreille	2,914	63.64%	1,345	29.37%	320	6.99%	1,569	34.27%	4,579
Spokane	78,016	60.12%	45,100	34.76%	6,647	5.12%	32,916	25.37%	129,763
Stevens	9,586	67.97%	3,623	25.69%	895	6.35%	5,963	42.28%	14,104
Walla Walla	10,084	68.20%	4,086	27.64%	615	4.16%	5,998	40.57%	14,785
Whitman	6,843	64.42%	3,362	31.65%	418	3.93%	3,481	32.77%	10,623
Totals	126,757	62.66%	65,146	32.21%	10,379	5.13%	61,611	30.46%	202,282

== District 6 ==
2002 Washington's 6th congressional district election
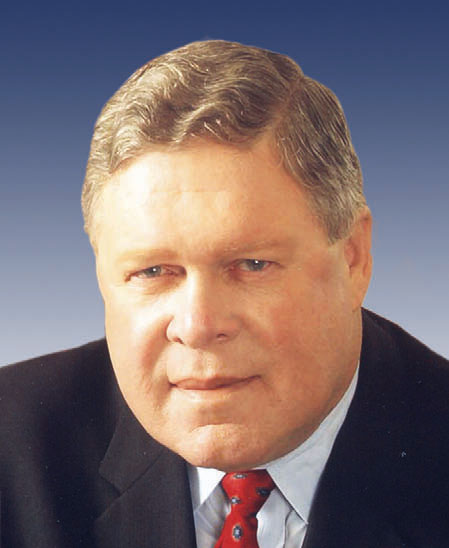

Nominee	Norm Dicks	Bob Lawrence
Party	Democratic	Republican
Popular vote	126,116	61,584
Percentage	64.2%	31.4%
- County results Dicks: 50–60% 60–70%
U.S. Representative before election
Norm Dicks
Democratic
Elected U.S. Representative
Norm Dicks
Democratic

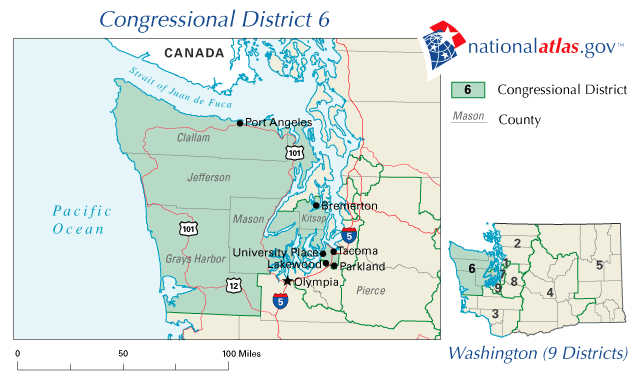

Long-serving Democratic Congressman Norm Dicks, the longest-serving of Washington congressmen, has represented this liberal-leaning, Kitsap Peninsula-based district since he was first elected in United States House of Representatives elections, 1980#Washington. Congressman Dicks faced Republican nominee Bob Lawrence in the general election, who was also his opponent in the previous two elections. Lawrence hardly faced a chance in the general election, and Dicks was swept into his fourteenth term in a landslide.

=== Predictions ===
Source	Ranking	As of
Sabato's Crystal Ball	Safe D	November 4, 2002
New York Times	Safe D	October 14, 2002

=== Results ===
2002 Washington's 6th congressional district election
Party	Candidate	Votes	%
Democratic	Norm Dicks (inc.)	126,116	64.20
Republican	Bob Lawrence	61,584	31.35
Libertarian	John A. Bennett	8,744	4.45
Total votes		196,444	100.00
Democratic hold			

==== By county ====
County results
County	Norm Dicks Democratic		Bob Lawrence Republican		John A. Bennett Libertarian		Margin		Total votes
County	#	%	#	%	#	%	#	%	Total votes
Clallam	13,748	52.36%	10,582	40.30%	1,926	7.34%	3,166	12.06%	26,256
Grays Harbor	11,683	66.74%	4,957	28.32%	864	4.94%	6,726	38.43%	17,504
Jefferson	8,426	64.59%	3,909	29.97%	710	5.44%	4,517	34.63%	13,045
Kitsap (part)	24,845	67.99%	10,332	28.28%	1,363	3.73%	14,513	39.72%	36,540
Mason	10,211	61.49%	5,429	32.69%	966	5.82%	4,782	28.80%	16,606
Pierce (part)	57,203	66.14%	26,375	30.49%	2,915	3.37%	30,828	35.64%	86,493
Totals	126,116	64.20%	61,584	31.35%	8,744	4.45%	64,532	32.85%	196,444

== District 7 ==
2002 Washington's 7th congressional district election
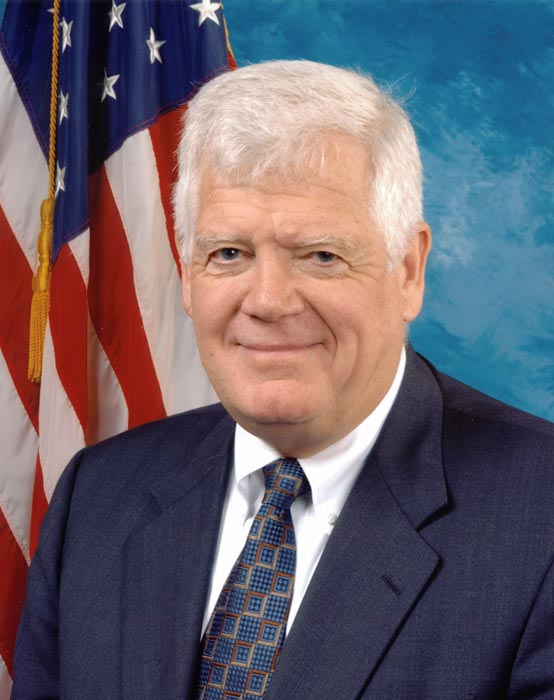

Nominee	Jim McDermott	Carol Cassady
Party	Democratic	Republican
Popular vote	156,300	46,256
Percentage	74.1%	21.9%
- County results McDermott: 70–80%
U.S. Representative before election
Jim McDermott
Democratic
Elected U.S. Representative
Jim McDermott
Democratic

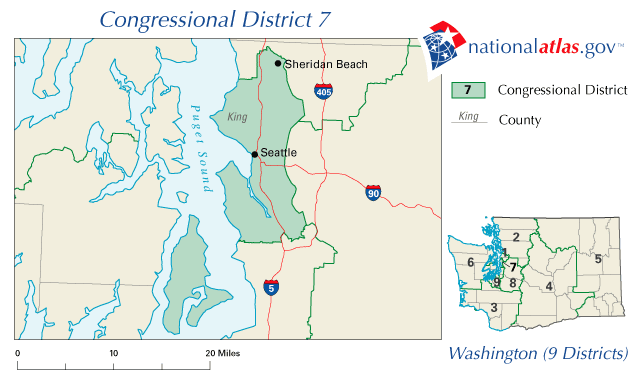

This district, the most liberal in Washington, encompasses most of the city of Seattle and has been represented by Democratic Congressman Jim McDermott since he was first elected in 1988. Running for a seventh term this year, McDermott faced off against Republican Carol Cassady and Libertarian Stan Lippmann, whom he crushed in the general election by a convincing margin.

=== Predictions ===
Source	Ranking	As of
Sabato's Crystal Ball	Safe D	November 4, 2002
New York Times	Safe D	October 14, 2002

=== Results ===
2002 Washington's 7th congressional district election
Party	Candidate	Votes	%
Democratic	Jim McDermott (inc.)	156,300	74.07
Republican	Carol Cassady	46,256	21.92
Libertarian	Stan Lippmann	8,447	4.00
Total votes		211,003	100.00
Democratic hold			

==== By county ====
County results
County	Jim McDermott Democratic		Carol Cassady Republican		Stan Lippmann Libertarian		Margin		Total votes
County	#	%	#	%	#	%	#	%	Total votes
King (part)	156,300	74.07%	46,256	21.92%	8,447	4.00%	110,044	52.15%	211,003
Totals	156,300	74.07%	46,256	21.92%	8,447	4.00%	110,044	52.15%	211,003

== District 8 ==
2002 Washington's 8th congressional district election
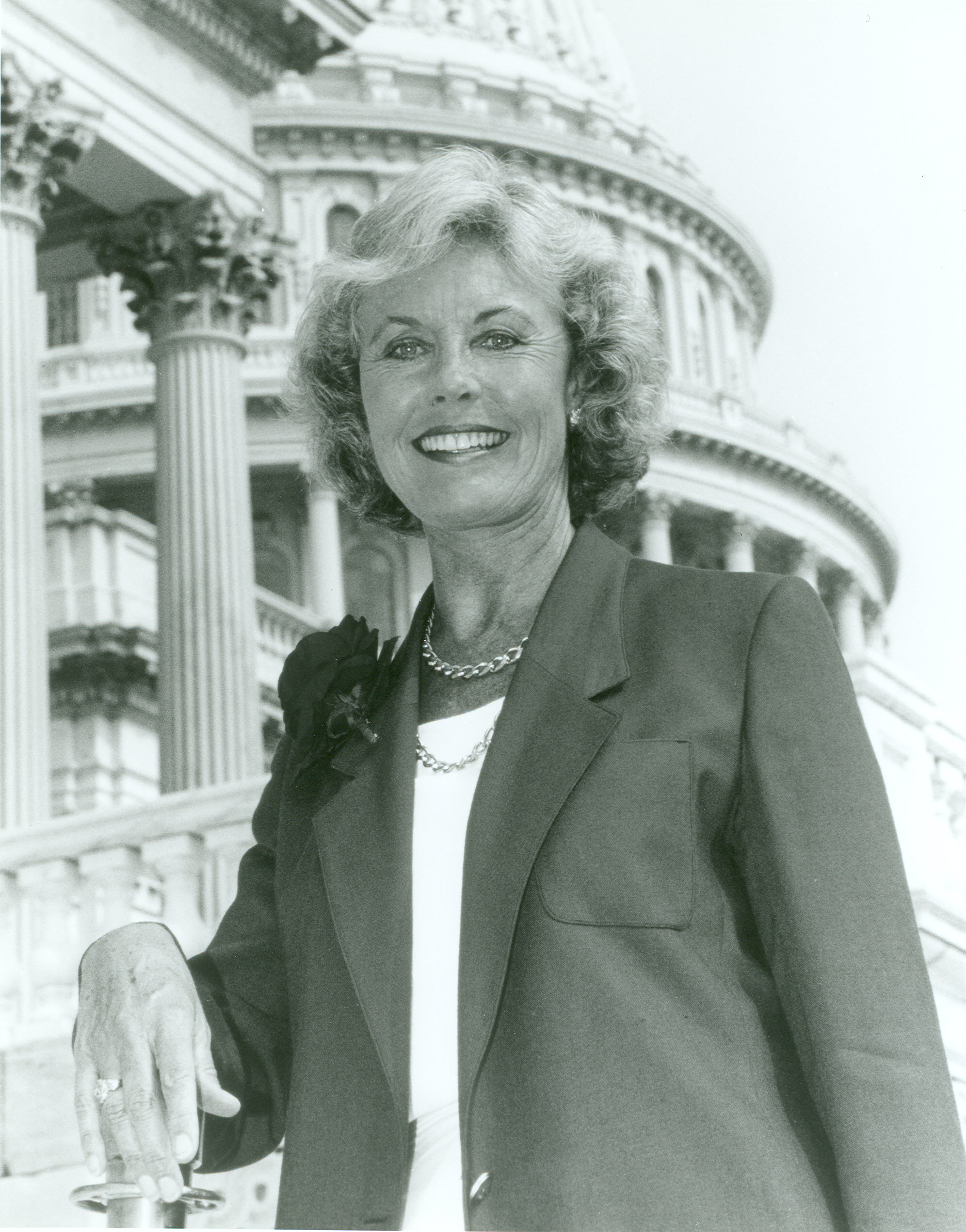

Nominee	Jennifer Dunn	Heidi Behrens-Benedict
Party	Republican	Democratic
Popular vote	121,633	75,931
Percentage	59.8%	37.3%
- County results Dunn: 50–60% 60–70%
U.S. Representative before election
Jennifer Dunn
Republican
Elected U.S. Representative
Jennifer Dunn
Republican

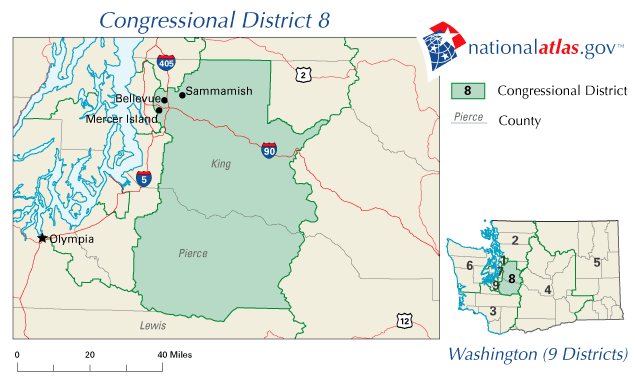

Incumbent Republican Congresswoman Jennifer Dunn ran for a seventh term in this liberal-leaning district and faced Democratic nominee Heidi Behrens-Benedict and Libertarian Mark Taff in the general election. Though this district, based in the eastern suburbs of Seattle, has a tendency to vote Democratic, the potential potency of Behrens-Benedict’s candidacy was hampered by the fact that she has achieved perennial status, running for the same seat two previous times. Ultimately, Congresswoman Dunn was re-elected by a solid margin on election day.

=== Predictions ===
Source	Ranking	As of
Sabato's Crystal Ball	Safe R	November 4, 2002
New York Times	Safe R	October 14, 2002

=== Results ===
2002 Washington's 8th congressional district election
Party	Candidate	Votes	%
Republican	Jennifer Dunn (inc.)	121,633	59.82
Democratic	Heidi Behrens-Benedict	75,931	37.34
Libertarian	Mark A. Taff	5,771	2.84
Total votes		203,335	100.00
Republican hold			

==== By county ====
County results
County	Jennifer Dunn Republican		Heidi Behrens-Benedict Democratic		Mark A. Taff Libertarian		Margin		Total votes
County	#	%	#	%	#	%	#	%	Total votes
King (part)	98,565	59.44%	62,876	37.92%	4,377	2.64%	35,689	21.52%	165,818
Pierce (part)	23,068	61.49%	13,055	34.80%	1,394	3.72%	10,013	26.69%	37,517
Totals	121,633	59.82%	75,931	37.34%	5,771	2.84%	45,702	22.48%	203,335

== District 9 ==
2002 Washington's 9th congressional district election
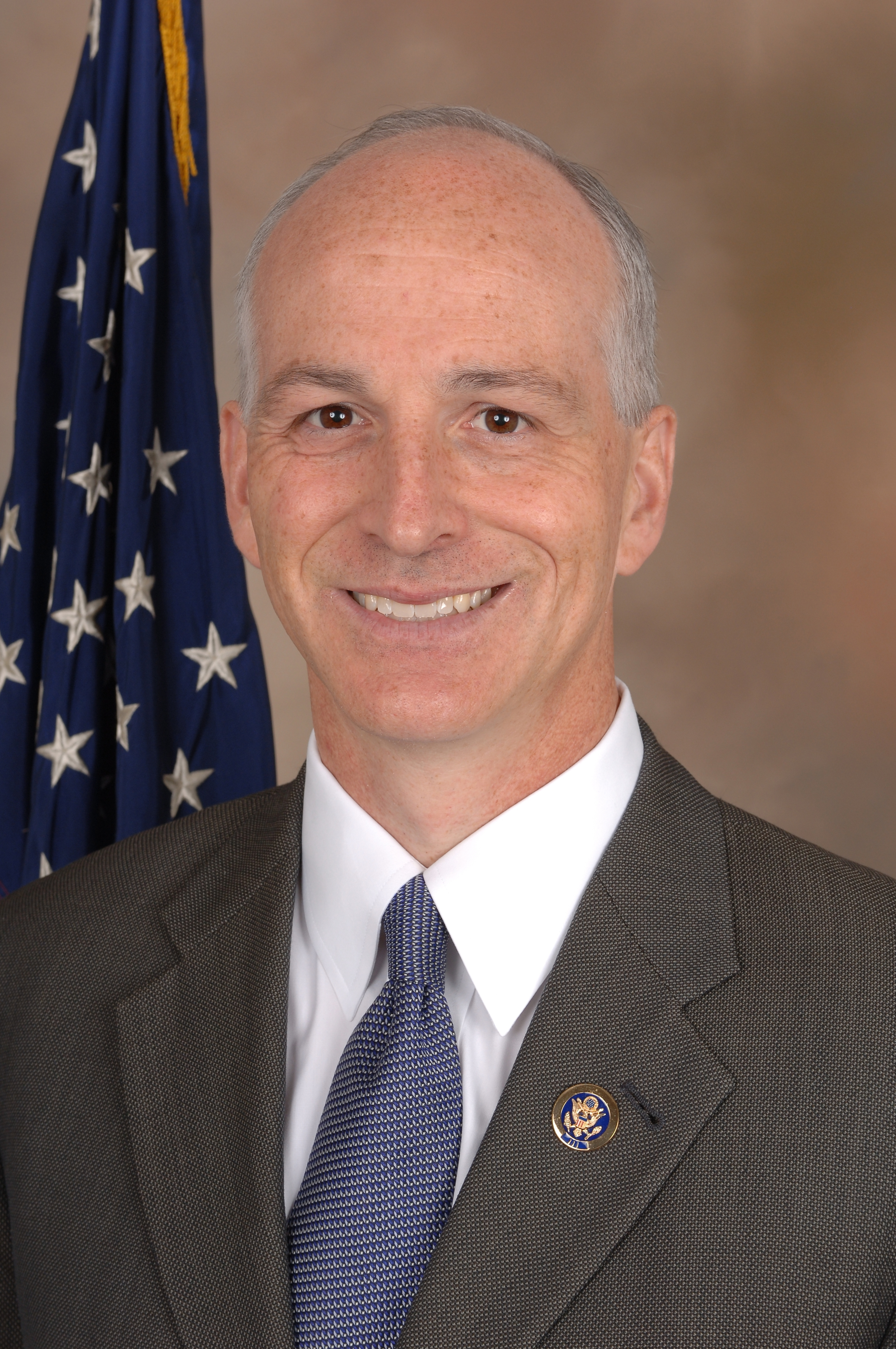

Nominee	Adam Smith	Sarah Casada
Party	Democratic	Republican
Popular vote	95,805	63,146
Percentage	58.5%	38.6%
- County results Smith: 50–60% 60–70%
U.S. Representative before election
Adam Smith
Democratic
Elected U.S. Representative
Adam Smith
Democratic

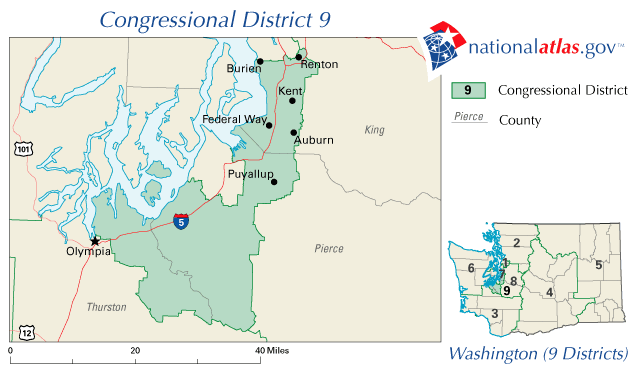

In his bid for a fourth term, incumbent Democratic Congressman Adam Smith was opposed by Republican State Representative Sarah Casada and Libertarian candidate John Mills in the general election. Congressman Smith represents a liberal-leaning district that runs from the state’s capital of Olympia to some of the southern suburbs of Seattle, and, true to the liberal tendencies of his constituency, Smith was re-elected by a substantial margin over Casada and Mills.

=== Predictions ===
Source	Ranking	As of
Sabato's Crystal Ball	Safe D	November 4, 2002
New York Times	Safe D	October 14, 2002

=== Results ===
2002 Washington's 9th congressional district election
Party	Candidate	Votes	%
Democratic	Adam Smith (inc.)	95,805	58.52
Republican	Sarah Casada	63,146	38.57
Libertarian	John Mills	4,759	2.91
Total votes		163,710	100.00
Democratic hold			

==== By county ====
County results
County	Adam Smith Democratic		Sarah Casada Republican		John Mills Libertarian		Margin		Total votes
County	#	%	#	%	#	%	#	%	Total votes
King (part)	45,639	62.09%	25,773	35.06%	2,092	2.85%	19,866	27.03%	73,504
Pierce (part)	33,462	53.83%	26,978	43.40%	1,728	2.78%	6,484	10.43%	62,168
Thurston (part)	16,704	59.58%	10,395	37.07%	939	3.35%	6,309	22.50%	28,038
Totals	95,805	58.52%	63,146	38.57%	4,759	2.91%	32,659	19.95%	163,710
