= Brian Baird =

American psychologist, politician and university administrator (born 1956)

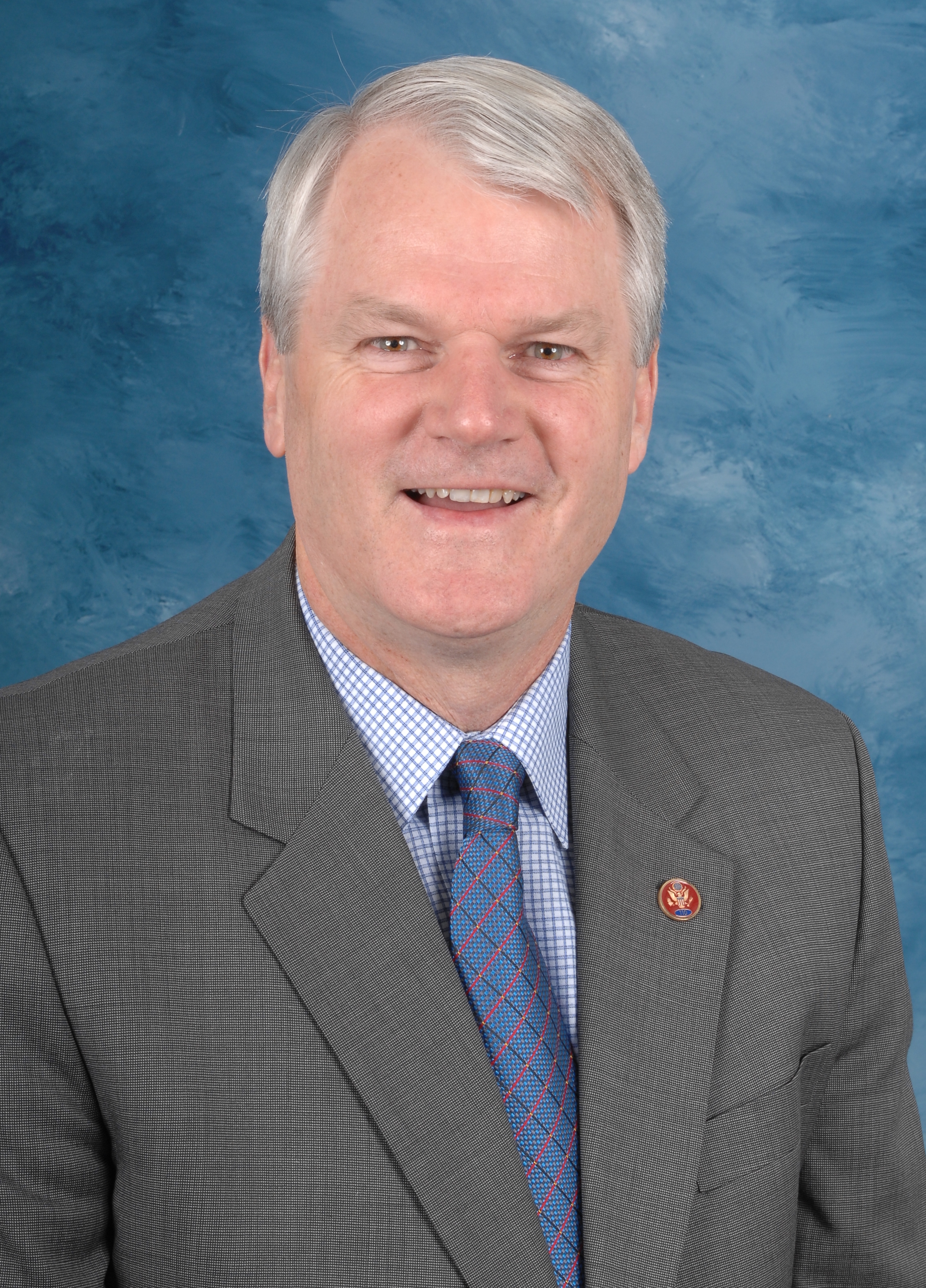
- Official portrait, 2008

Member of the U.S. House of Representatives from Washington's 3rd district
- In office January 3, 1999 – January 3, 2011
- Preceded by: Linda Smith
- Succeeded by: Jaime Herrera Beutler

Personal details
- Born: Brian Norton Baird; March 7, 1956 (age 70) Chama, New Mexico, U.S.
- Party: Democratic
- Spouse: Rachel Nugent
- Children: 2
- Relatives: Maggie Baird (sister); Finneas O'Connell (nephew); Billie Eilish (niece)
- Education: University of Utah (BS); University of Wyoming (MS, PhD)

Brian Norton Baird (born March 7, 1956) is an American psychologist and politician. A member of the Democratic Party, he served as a U.S. representative for Washington's 3rd congressional district from 1999 to 2011.

After leaving Congress, he served as the president of Antioch University Seattle from 2011 to 2015.

== Early life and education ==
Baird was born in Chama, New Mexico, to Edith Shaw and William Norton "Bill" Baird, a town councilman and mayor. His younger sister is actress Maggie Baird. He received his Bachelor of Science degree from the University of Utah, graduating Phi Beta Kappa in 1977, and his Master of Science degree and PhD in clinical psychology from the University of Wyoming.

== Career ==
He is the former chairman of the Department of Psychology at Pacific Lutheran University in Tacoma, Washington, and a licensed clinical psychologist. He has published several journal articles and three books. He regularly teaches professional development courses to attorneys and judges on communications, ethics and the psychology of persuasion. Baird is a member of the ReFormers Caucus of Issue One.

== U.S. House of Representatives ==
=== Committee assignments ===
- Committee on Science and Technology
  - Subcommittee on Energy and Environment (Chair)
  - Subcommittee on Research and Science Education
- Committee on Transportation and Infrastructure
  - Subcommittee on Coast Guard and Maritime Transportation
  - Subcommittee on Highways and Transit
  - Subcommittee on Water Resources and Environment

=== Caucus memberships ===
- Congressional Career and Technical Education Caucus (co-founder)
- Congressional Caucus to Control and Fight Methamphetamine (co-founder)
- Congressional National Parks Caucus (co-founder)
- Addiction, Treatment, and Recovery Caucus
- Community College Caucus
- Community Health Centers Caucus
- Congressional Boating Caucus
- Congressional Brain Injury Task Force
- Congressional Caucus on Intellectual Property Promotion and Piracy Prevention
- Congressional China Caucus
- Congressional Coast Guard Caucus
- Congressional Coastal Caucus
- Congressional Diabetes Caucus
- Congressional Fire Service Caucus
- Congressional Fitness Caucus
- Congressional Mental Health Caucus
- Congressional Native American Caucus
- Congressional Port Security Caucus
- Congressional Rural Caucus
- Congressional Ski and Snowboard Caucus
- Democratic Caucus
- Friends of New Zealand Caucus
- Hellenic Caucus
- House Education Caucus
- House Science, Technology, Engineering and Math Education Caucus
- International Conservation Caucus
- Medical Malpractice Caucus
- New Democrat Caucus
- Northwest Energy Caucus
- Prochoice Caucus Democratic Task Force
- Renewable Energy and Energy Efficiency Caucus
- U.S. China Working Group
- Congressional Law Enforcement Caucus
- Mountain West Caucus
- Middle East Economic Partnership Caucus

Baird was also a member of the House Transportation and Infrastructure Committee, the House Science Committee, the House Budget Committee, and the House Select Committee on Continuity in Government. He served as a senior regional whip and on the Democratic Steering Committee, was elected president of the 1998 Democratic Freshman Class, and was a member of the New Democrat Coalition.

On his House of Representatives website, Baird wrote that during his time in Congress, he had flown home nearly every weekend and hosted more than 280 town hall meetings, and that he had visited every high school, port, hospital and countless businesses and organizations in Southwest Washington.

Baird held over 300 town halls, or one for approximately every week and a half he was in office. Although they usually had around 50 participants, when held during passionate debates, they had up to 3000.

=== Visit to Gaza Strip ===
On February 19, 2009, Baird, together with fellow congressman Keith Ellison (D-MN), visited Gaza to view firsthand the destruction from the Gaza War and meet with international and local relief agencies. Others in the visit included Senator John Kerry (D-MA). The visit, which was not sanctioned by the Obama Administration, was the first time anyone from the U.S. government had entered Gaza in more than three years. Baird said:

"The amount of physical destruction and the depth of human suffering here [in Gaza] is staggering. Entire neighborhoods have been destroyed, schools completely leveled, fundamental water, sewer, and electricity facilities hit and relief agencies heavily damaged. The personal stories of children being killed in their homes or schools, entire families wiped out, and relief workers prevented from evacuating the wounded are heart-wrenching—what went on here, and what is continuing to go on, is shocking and troubling beyond words."

After Baird's third visit to Gaza in February 2010, he called on the U.S. to end the blockade and to deliver humanitarian supplies, which could include withholding military aid from Israel, saying the U.S. needed to be more serious about getting Israel to address the humanitarian crisis in Gaza.

== Political campaigns ==
Baird challenged Republican incumbent Linda Smith in 1996 and lost by only 887 votes. Smith gave up the seat to make an unsuccessful bid for the United States Senate in 1998. Baird ran again and defeated State Senator Don Benton with 54.7% of the vote. He never faced another race that close, and was reelected five times.

On December 9, 2009, Baird announced he would not run for reelection in 2010. After his retirement, Baird and his family moved to Edmonds, Washington, and he wrote books on American politics.

== Electoral history ==
Washington's 3rd congressional district: Results 1996–2008
Year	Democrat	Votes	Pct	Republican	Votes	Pct	3rd Party	Party	Votes	Pct
1996	Brian Baird	122,230	50%	Linda Smith	123,117	50%				
1998	Brian Baird	120,364	55%	Don Benton	99,855	45%				
2000	Brian Baird	159,428	56%	Trent R. Matson	114,861	41%	Erne Lewis	Libertarian	8,375	3%
2002	Brian Baird	119,264	62%	Joseph Zarelli	74,065	38%				
2004	Brian Baird	193,626	62%	Thomas A. Crowson	119,027	38%				
2006	Brian Baird	147,065	63%	Michael Messmore	85,915	37%				
2008	Brian Baird	216,701	64%	Michael Delavar	121,828	36%				

== Books ==
- Baird, Brian N.; illustrations by David Horsey (1995). Are We Having Fun Yet?: Enjoying the Outdoors With Partners, Families, and Groups. Seattle: Mountaineers Books. ISBN 978-0-89886-449-6.
- Baird, Brian N. (1996). The Internship, Practicum, and Field Placement Handbook: A Guide for the Helping Professions (fourth edition, 2004 ed.). New Jersey: Prentice Hall. ISBN 978-0-13-118116-8.
- Baird, Brian N. (2010). Character Politics and Responsibility. Lightning Source UK Ltd. ISBN 978-0-578-06642-4.

== Personal life ==
Baird is married to Rachel Nugent and they have two children together. He is the maternal uncle of singer-songwriters Billie Eilish and Finneas O'Connell.

U.S. House of Representatives
Preceded by Linda Smith	Member of the U.S. House of Representatives from Washington's 3rd congressional district 1999–2011	Succeeded by Jaime Herrera Beutler
U.S. order of precedence (ceremonial)
Preceded by Denny Rehberg as Former U.S. Representative	Order of precedence of the United States as Former U.S. Representative	Succeeded by Jaime Herrera Beutler as Former U.S. Representative
