= Jaime Herrera Beutler =

American politician (born 1978)

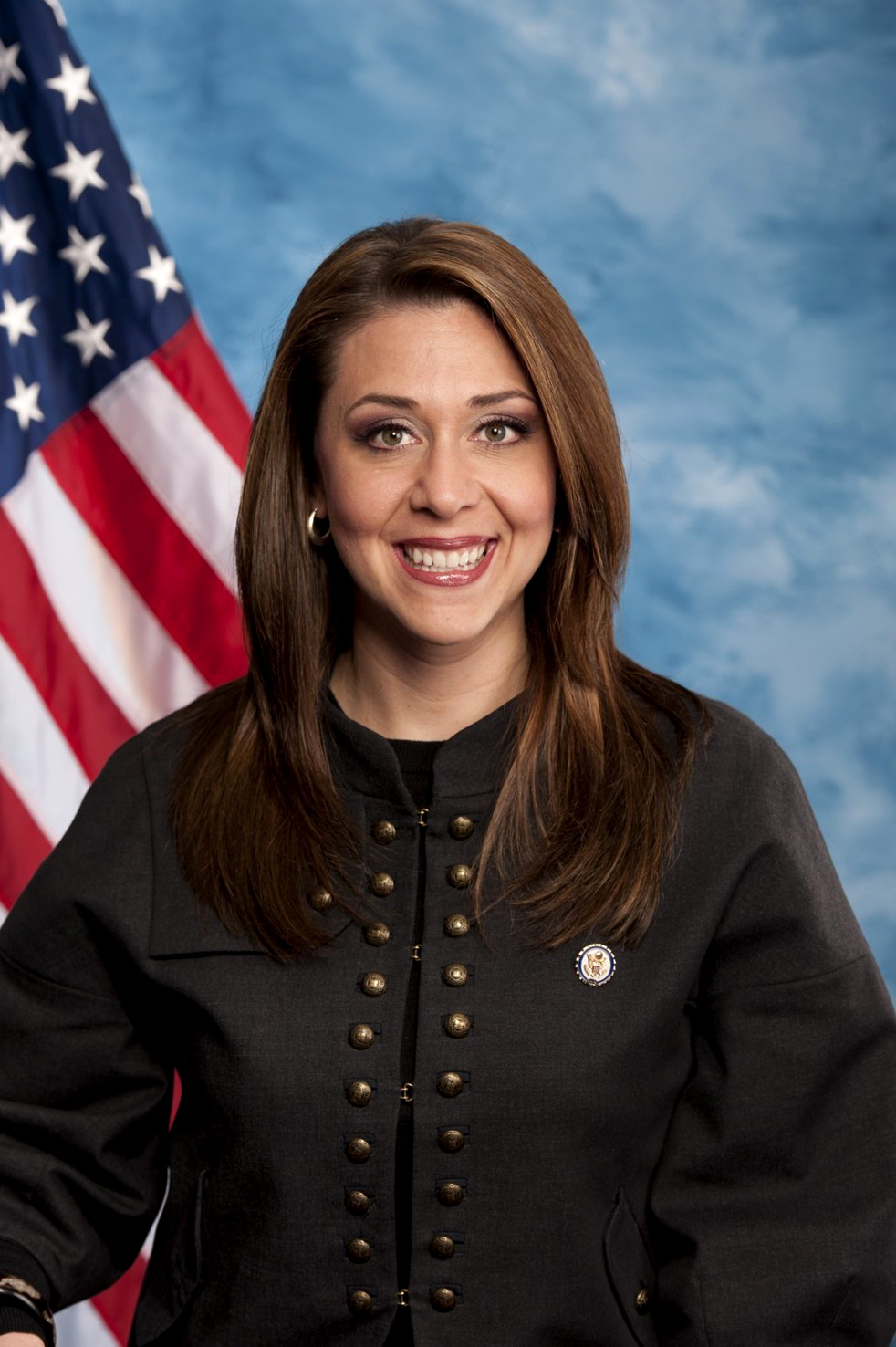
- Official portrait, 2012

Member of the U.S. House of Representatives from Washington's 3rd district
- In office January 3, 2011 – January 3, 2023
- Preceded by: Brian Baird
- Succeeded by: Marie Gluesenkamp Perez

Member of the Washington House of Representatives from the 18th district
- In office November 29, 2007 – January 2, 2011
- Preceded by: Richard Curtis
- Succeeded by: Ann Rivers

Personal details
- Born: Jaime Lynn Herrera; November 3, 1978 (age 48) Glendale, California, U.S.
- Party: Republican
- Spouse: Daniel Beutler (m. 2008)
- Children: 3
- Education: Bellevue College (attended); University of Washington (BA)

Jaime Lynn Herrera Beutler (/həˈrɛrə ˈbʌtlər/ hə-RERR-ə BUT-lər; born November 3, 1978) is an American politician who served as the U.S. representative for Washington's 3rd congressional district from 2011 to 2023. The district is in southwestern Washington, lying across the Columbia River from Oregon's Portland metropolitan area. A Republican, Herrera Beutler previously served in the Washington House of Representatives.

Herrera Beutler was one of ten Republicans who voted to impeach Donald Trump after the January 6 United States Capitol attack. During Trump's Senate trial, she issued a statement as a witness. This prompted a primary challenge from several Republican candidates. She was eliminated in the 2022 blanket primary, finishing third, and was succeeded by Democrat Marie Gluesenkamp Perez.

== Early life, education, and early career ==
Jaime Lynn Herrera was born in Glendale, California, the daughter of Candice Marie (Rough) and Armando D. Herrera. Her father is of Mexican descent, and her mother has English, Irish, Scottish, and German ancestry. She was raised in Ridgefield, where her father was a lithographer. She was home-schooled through ninth grade, and graduated from Prairie High School, where she played basketball. In 2004, Herrera earned a B.A. in communications from the University of Washington.

Herrera served as an intern in both the Washington State Senate and in Washington, D. C., at the White House Office of Political Affairs. In 2004, she was an intern in the office of Washington State Senator Joe Zarelli, who later supported her campaigns. She was a senior legislative aide to U.S. representative Cathy McMorris Rodgers.

== Washington State House of Representatives ==
=== 2008 election ===
Herrera moved back to the 18th Legislative District to run for state representative, and was appointed to the Washington House of Representatives in 2007 to replace Richard Curtis, who resigned amid a sex scandal. She won the 2008 election to retain her seat with 60% of the vote.

=== Tenure ===
Herrera was elected as Assistant Floor Leader, the youngest member of her party's leadership in the State House. Her first sponsored bill gave tax relief to business owners serving in the military. Governor Christine Gregoire signed it into law on March 27, 2008.

During her time in the House, Herrera also opposed Senate Bill 5967, which mandated equal treatment of the sexes in community athletic programs run by cities, school districts, and private leagues.

=== Committee assignments ===
- Health Care and Wellness
- Human Services
- Transportation

== U.S. House of Representatives ==
=== Elections ===
==== 2010 ====
Herrera ran for Washington's 3rd congressional district when Democratic incumbent Brian Baird retired. She advanced to the general election with 28% of the vote, well ahead of fellow Republican candidates David Hedrick and David Castillo. State Representative Denny Heck, a Democrat, ranked first with 31% of the vote.

Herrera raised over $1.5 million in contributions, 62% of which came from individual contributors and 35% from political action committees. The biggest single contributor was construction and mining contractor Kiewit Corporation, which gave her campaign over $16,000.

During the campaign, she received support from state Republican leaders Cathy McMorris Rodgers and former U.S. senator Slade Gorton. The Columbian called her "a rising star in the Republican Party". In October, Herrera was named one of Time Magazine's 40 under 40: "The Washington Republican survived a Tea Party challenge to win the GOP primary in the Evergreen State's 3rd Congressional District. Now Herrera, a 31-year-old Latina and former congressional staffer, has successfully recast herself as the outsider as she takes on a longtime Democratic pol in November."

In the November general election, Herrera defeated Heck, 53%–47%. She won five of the district's six counties. Heck later represented Washington's 10th congressional district, serving alongside Herrera.

On December 22, 2010, Herrera announced that she had taken her husband's name and would thenceforth call herself Jaime Herrera Beutler.

==== 2012 ====
Herrera Beutler announced her candidacy for reelection in January 2012. She quickly outraised her two opponents, Democrat Jon Haugen and Independent Norma Jean Stevens. She won the open primary with 61% of the vote. By the end of the campaign, she had raised more than $1.5 million to Haugen's $10,000. She defeated Haugen 60%–40%.

==== 2014 ====
Herrera Beutler ran for reelection in 2014. She faced Republican challenger Michael Delavar and Democratic challenger Bob Dingethal. Dingethal and Herrera Beutler advanced to the general election, where Herrera Beutler defeated Dingethal, 60% to 40%.

==== 2016 ====
In the nonpartisan blanket primary, Herrera Beutler finished first with 55.4% of the vote; Democrat Jim Moeller finished second with 24.4%. In the general election, Herrera Beutler won with 62% of the vote to Moeller's 38%.

==== 2018 ====
In the nonpartisan blanket primary, Herrera Beutler finished first with 40.9% of the vote; Democrat Carolyn Long, a political science professor at Washington State University's Vancouver campus, finished second with 36.6%. Combined, the Democrats in the primary received just over 50% of the vote. In the general election, Herrera Beutler defeated Long with 53% percent of the vote, the closest race since her first campaign. She was one of only two Republicans, the other being Don Young of Alaska, to win a seat west of the Cascades or on the Pacific Coast.

==== 2020 ====
Herrera Beutler received over 56% of the vote in the blanket primary and Long just under 40%, setting up a rematch between the two. In the general election, Herrera Beutler won by a larger margin than in 2018, defeating Long by about 13 points.

==== 2022 ====
Former Green Beret Joe Kent challenged Herrera Beutler in the 2022 top-two primary for Congress. A Trump supporter, Kent ran because of her vote to impeach Trump. In the nonpartisan blanket primary, Herrera Beutler failed to advance to the general election, losing to Kent and Democrat Marie Gluesenkamp Perez. On August 9, she conceded, saying, "I’m proud that I always told the truth, stuck to my principles, and did what I knew to be best for our country." Kent went on to lose the general election to Gluesenkamp Perez.

=== Tenure ===
In March 2011, Herrera Beutler introduced her first bill to Congress. The Savings Start With Us Act would reduce the salaries of members of Congress, the president, and the vice president by 10%.

After the birth of her daughter Abigail (who was diagnosed with Potter's syndrome) in July 2013, Herrera Beutler announced that she would still be active in the House for key votes, but would dedicate a good deal of time to Abigail's care.

In June 2014, Herrera Beutler proposed the Advancing Care for Exceptional Kids Act, which would help coordinate care for children met with medical complexities in Medicaid. The bill was passed by a committee, but did not get a vote on the House floor.

Herrera Beutler is a member of the Republican Main Street Partnership and the Congressional Western Caucus.

In the first impeachment of Donald Trump, on December 18, 2019, Herrera Beutler voted against both articles of impeachment, along with all other voting Republicans. On January 12, 2021, she announced her support for Trump's second impeachment, after the storming of the U.S. Capitol six days earlier, citing "indisputable evidence" that Trump had "acted against his oath of office". She blamed him for inciting the storming and upbraided him for continuing to push lawmakers to object to certifying the results of the presidential election rather than "doing anything meaningful to stop the attack". She called Trump's initial statement denouncing the violence "pathetic". Responding to claims that impeaching Trump would only "inflame Republican voters", Herrera Beutler said that as a Republican herself, she believed that she and other Republicans "will be best served when those among us choose truth". The next day, she and nine other Republican representatives voted to impeach Trump. In response to backlash from Republicans in her district over her vote, Herrera Beutler made several Twitter posts on January 15 expanding on her reasoning, citing "indisputable and publicly available facts" that proved Trump had engaged in impeachable conduct. She said Minority Leader Kevin McCarthy asked Trump to tell the rioters to cease and desist and Trump responded, "Well, Kevin, I guess these people are more upset about the election than you are." She told a CNN reporter that the quote showed that "either [Trump] didn't care, which is impeachable, because you cannot allow an attack on your soil, or he wanted it to happen and was OK with it, which makes me so angry."

In March 2021, she voted against the American Rescue Plan Act of 2021.

On November 30, Herrera Beutler voted in favor of H.R. 550: Immunization Infrastructure Modernization Act of 2021. The bill helps create confidential, population-based databases that maintain a record of vaccine administrations.

=== Committee assignments ===
- Committee on Appropriations
  - Subcommittee on Labor, Health and Human Services, Education, and Related Agencies
  - Subcommittee on the Legislative Branch (Ranking Member)
- Joint Economic Committee

=== Caucus memberships ===
- Congressional Hispanic Conference
- Congressional Taiwan Caucus
- Republican Main Street Partnership
- Republican Governance Group
- Problem Solvers Caucus

== Political positions ==
During the 117th United States Congress, which began in 2021, Herrera Beutler voted with her party 90% of the time, ranking her the 35th most bipartisan member of the House. Early on during Trump's first term as president, Herrera Beutler was rated as having voted in line with his position 79.7% of the time. Her partisan reputation softened over the course of her tenure in Congress.

=== Bio-defense ===
In 2019, the Alliance for Biosecurity, a consortium of companies that develop products to respond to national security threats, gave Herrera Beutler its 2019 Congressional Biosecurity Champion Award. The award is given once a year to a member of Congress who works to improve the country's ability to prevent and combat major bio-security threats to national security.

=== Budget ===
In April 2011, Herrera Beutler voted for Paul Ryan's budget, which would have lowered taxes for the highest earners from 35% to 25% and made Medicare a voucher system.

=== Donald Trump ===
In December 2019, Herrera Beutler voted against impeaching President Trump, saying that there was inadequate proof that he engaged in obstruction of justice and abuse of power. In 2021, she voted in favor of Trump's second impeachment in the wake of the 2021 storming of the United States Capitol, which she blamed him for inciting.

On May 19, 2021, Herrera Beutler was one of 35 Republicans who joined all Democrats in voting to approve legislation to establish the January 6 commission meant to investigate the storming of the U.S. Capitol.

=== Healthcare ===
In 2012, during a debate, Herrera Beutler stated that she favored repealing the Patient Protection and Affordable Care Act (PPACA or ACA, generally known as Obamacare, which had become law two years previously, in 2010).

Five years later, however, in March 2017, Herrera Beutler indicated that she would vote against the American Health Care Act, a Republican replacement for Obamacare, because of its adverse effects on children who depend on Medicaid.

=== Immigration ===
After Trump implemented an executive order banning immigration from seven countries with high rates of homegrown terrorist groups, all of which are predominantly Muslim in population, The Seattle Times reported in January 2017 that Herrera Beutler "was vaguely critical of the order, without saying she opposed it or calling for any specific changes".

Herrera Beutler voted for the Further Consolidated Appropriations Act of 2020 which authorizes DHS to nearly double the available H-2B visas for the remainder of FY 2020.

Herrera Beutler voted for the Consolidated Appropriations Act (H.R. 1158), which effectively prohibits Immigration and Customs Enforcement from cooperating with the Department of Health and Human Services to detain or remove illegal alien sponsors of Unaccompanied Alien Children.

=== Iraq ===
In June 2021, Herrera Beutler was one of 49 House Republicans to vote to repeal the AUMF against Iraq.

=== LGBT rights ===
In July 2022, she voted against the Respect for Marriage Act, which would establish federal protections for same-sex and interracial marriages. On December 8, 2022, she joined 38 other Republicans in the House and voted in favor of the final passage of the Respect for Marriage Act.

=== Sexual abuse ===
In November 2013, Herrera Beutler co-sponsored the Military Justice Improvement Act, which would address a rise in military sexual assaults. Under the act, the military chain of command would lose the power to evaluate and respond to such incidents. "Despite efforts by military leadership to address this serious issue, the problem remains", she said in a news release. "A Defense Department report found that fewer than one in six cases were being reported to authorities, often due to fear of retaliation by superiors. A quarter of the time, the perpetrators of these crimes were in the victims' direct chain of command."

In December 2017, Trump signed into law the National Defense Authorization Act (NDAA) for 2018, which included part of Herrera Beutler's and Suzan DelBene’s (WA-01) Child Abuse Accountability Enhancement Act (H.R. 1103). The act closed a legal loophole that denied justice to some survivors of child abuse.

=== Steve Bannon ===
On October 21, 2021, Herrera Beutler was one of nine House Republicans who voted to hold Steve Bannon in contempt of Congress.

=== Ukraine ===
In 2022, Herrera Beutler voted to provide approximately US$14 billion to the government of Ukraine (equivalent to $15.4 billion in 2025).

== Post-congressional career ==
After leaving Congress in January 2023, Herrera Beutler was hired by the Children's Hospital Association (CHA) as a strategic adviser. In October 2023, she announced her candidacy in the 2024 Washington Public Lands Commissioner election. Herrera Beutler was defeated by Democrat Dave Upthegrove in the general election, receiving 47% of the vote, the highest for a statewide Republican candidate that cycle.

== Personal life ==
In August 2008, Herrera married Daniel Beutler, who worked for SeaPort Airlines. The couple lives in Camas, Washington. In December 2010, she announced that she had taken her husband's name, and would thenceforth be known as Jaime Herrera Beutler.

In May 2013, Herrera Beutler announced that she and her husband were expecting their first child. In June 2013, she announced that her unborn child had been diagnosed with Potter's Syndrome, an often fatal condition in which abnormally low amniotic fluid caused by impaired kidney function inhibits normal lung development. A stranger who read the news suggested that she try an experimental treatment: saline injections into her uterus that would enable the baby to develop without kidneys. She said she tried several hospitals, and told CNN that "most wouldn't even return her calls". Finally, a doctor at Johns Hopkins agreed to try this treatment. The results were instantaneous. For four weeks, she drove every morning from the District of Columbia to Baltimore for injections.

Herrera Beutler is the ninth woman to give birth while serving in Congress. On July 29, 2013, it was announced that her baby had been born two weeks earlier, at 28 weeks' gestation. The girl, Abigail, was born without kidneys, and became the first child in recorded medical history to breathe on her own without both kidneys. In a Facebook post, Herrera Beutler said, "She is every bit a miracle." On July 24, 2013, Herrera Beutler was absent for a roll call vote concerning the NSA, citing health reasons. When she revealed Abigail's birth, it was understood that it was her reason for missing what was considered an important vote.

In early December 2013, Herrera Beutler announced that Abigail would be going home from the hospital nearly six months after her birth. On February 8, 2016, at age two, she received a kidney from her father at the Lucile Packard Children's Hospital Stanford in California.

In May 2016, Herrera Beutler gave birth to a boy. In May 2019, she gave birth to her third child, a girl named Isana. Her husband is a stay-at-home father.

== Electoral history ==
Washington's 3rd congressional district
Year	Democrat	Votes	Pct	Republican	Votes	Pct	
2010	Denny Heck	135,654	47%	Jaime Herrera Beutler	152,799	53%	
2012	Jon T. Haugen	116,438	40%	Jaime Herrera Beutler (incumbent)	177,446	60%	
2014	Bob Dingethal	78,018	38%	Jaime Herrera Beutler (incumbent)	124,796	62%	
2016	Jim Moeller	119,820	38%	Jaime Herrera Beutler (incumbent)	193,457	62%	
2018	Carolyn Long	145,407	47%	Jaime Herrera Beutler (incumbent)	161,819	53%	
2020	Carolyn Long	181,347	43%	Jaime Herrera Beutler (incumbent)	235,579	56%	*

* Write-in and minor candidate notes: In 2020, write-ins received 977 votes.

== See also ==
- List of Hispanic and Latino Americans in the United States Congress
- Women in the United States House of Representatives

U.S. House of Representatives
Preceded by Brian Baird	Member of the U.S. House of Representatives from Washington's 3rd congressional district 2011–2023	Succeeded by Marie Gluesenkamp Pérez
Preceded by Cynthia Lummis	Chair of the Congressional Women's Caucus; 2013–2015	Succeeded by Kristi Noem
U.S. order of precedence (ceremonial)
Preceded by Brian Baird as Former U.S. Representative	Order of precedence of the United States as Former U.S. Representative	Succeeded by Derek Kilmer as Former U.S. Representative
