= John McKibbin =

American politician

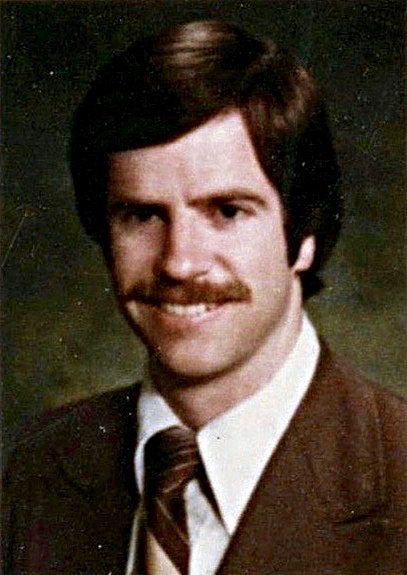
- McKibbin's official portrait as a State Representative, 1977

Clark County Commissioner
- In office 1978–1990

Member of the Washington House of Representatives
- In office 1975–1978

Personal details
- Born: January 20, 1947 Lancaster, California, U.S.
- Died: March 23, 2016 (aged 69) Astoria, Oregon, U.S.
- Party: Democratic
- Spouse: Nancy McKibbin (m. 1972)
- Children: 2
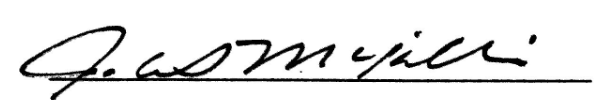
- Signature

John Simpson McKibbin (January 20, 1947 – March 23, 2016) was an American Democratic politician and businessman in the state of Washington.

== Career ==
McKibbin was born in Lancaster, California. McKibbin moved to Clark County, Washington in 1969, and began his career as a teacher at Columbia River High School. He was elected to the Washington House of Representatives from the 49th district in 1974, and in 1978 was elected a Clark County Commissioner with 71 percent of the vote.

McKibbin ran for the United States House of Representatives in 1988 from Washington's 3rd congressional district, coming in third place in the blanket primary behind Democratic state representative Jolene Unsoeld and Republican Bill Wight. He received 26.6% of the vote, and Unsoeld won the general election. McKibbin retired from politics in 1990 and worked as a real estate investor and developer, being appointed president of Identity Clark County in April 2014.

McKibbin became the CEO of the Greater Vancouver Chamber of Commerce in 2003, and served in that position for three years.

== Personal life ==
McKibbin was married to wife Nancy for 44 years, and had two daughters, Jennifer and Megan. They attended First Evangelical Church in Vancouver, Washington.

== Death ==
McKibbin was an avid pilot. On March 23, 2016, at around 3:30 PM, he departed Pearson Field for the Oregon Coast in a North American T-6 Texan with Irene Mustain, widow of Air Force veteran Terry Glen Mustain who died in 2013. The two were to spread Mustain's ashes on the coast, however the plane he was piloting crashed in the Columbia River near Astoria, Oregon at around 3:50 PM. The United States Coast Guard and Clatsop County Sheriff's Office promptly began searches, and McKibbin's body was recovered on March 25. The plane was recovered from the Columbia River on March 29, 2016.

A vigil was held at Pearson Air Field on March 26, 2016, and a memorial service was held on April 23, 2016, at Columbia Presbyterian Church.

=== NTSB Report ===
On February 12, 2018, the NTSB issued their report that indicated that the crash was due to loss of control of the aircraft. It also stated that the aircraft was not currently legal to fly as the annual inspection had not been performed. Further, it was not legal for Mr. McKibbin to be flying the aircraft because his required Biennial flight review was not current, and he was taking medications (sertraline and trazodone) that would prohibit him from flying. The report stated that he had been purchasing sertraline from India to prevent the FAA from discovering his use of the medication. The NTSB report stated that he also suffered from Severe depression and undiagnosed Coronary artery disease.
