= Jolene Unsoeld =

American politician (1931–2021)

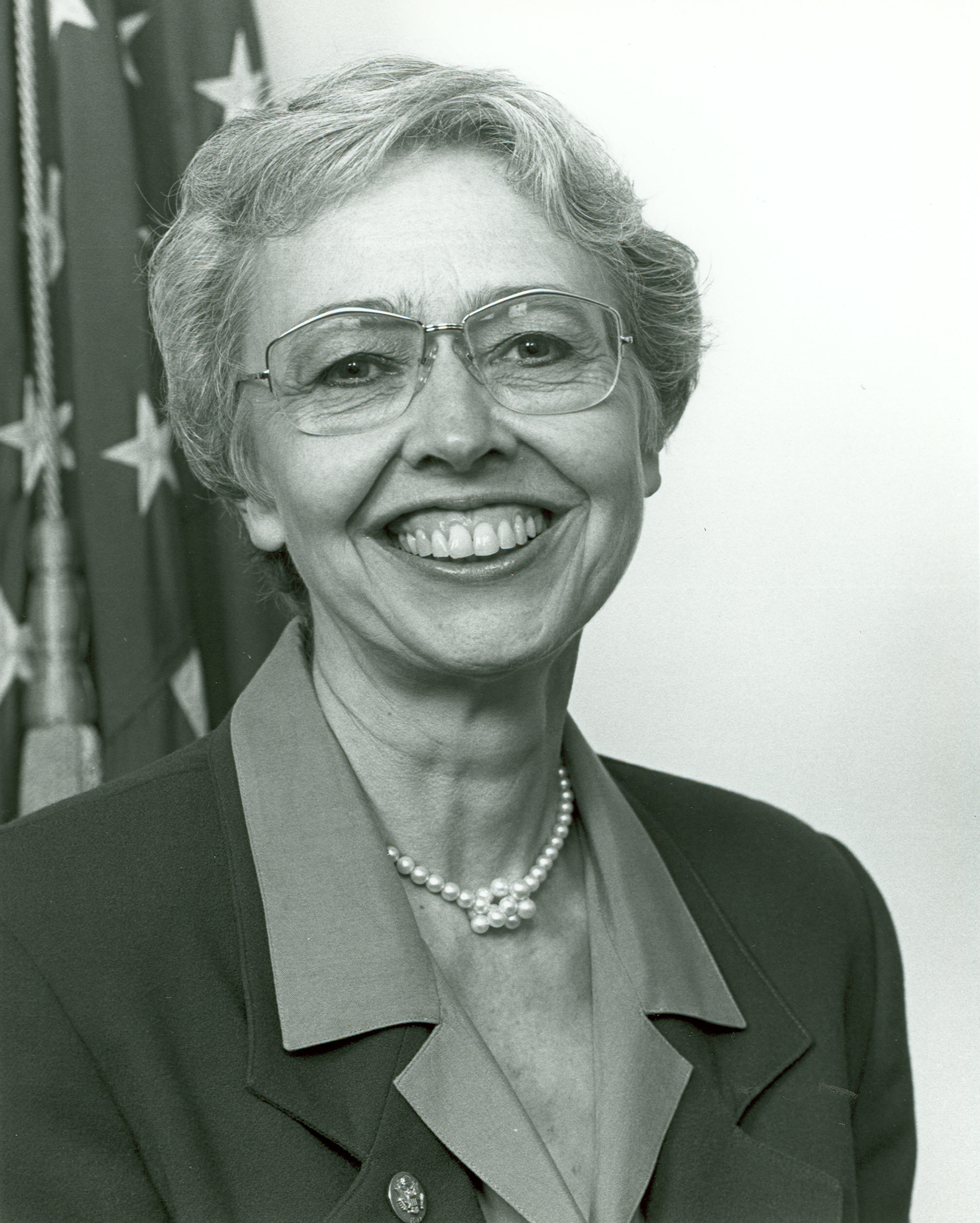

Member of the U.S. House of Representatives from Washington's 3rd district
- In office January 3, 1989 – January 3, 1995
- Preceded by: Don Bonker
- Succeeded by: Linda Smith

Member of the Washington House of Representatives from the 22nd district
- In office January 14, 1985 – January 9, 1989
- Preceded by: Mike Kreidler
- Succeeded by: Karen Fraser

Personal details
- Born: Jolene Bishoprick; December 3, 1931 Corvallis, Oregon, U.S.
- Died: November 28, 2021 (aged 89) Olympia, Washington, U.S.
- Party: Democratic
- Spouse: Willi Unsoeld (m. 1951; died 1979)
- Children: 4
- Education: Oregon State University

Jolene Bishoprick Unsoeld (December 3, 1931 – November 28, 2021) was an American politician who served as a member of the United States House of Representatives from 1989 to 1995. A Democrat, Unsoeld represented Washington's 3rd congressional district in Congress, where she developed a reputation as a supporter of environmentalist and feminist causes.

== Early life ==
Unsoeld was born Jolene Bishoprick in Corvallis, Oregon, on December 3, 1931, the daughter of Cora (Trapman) and Stanley Bishoprick, who was in the timber business.

She attended Oregon State University from 1949 to 1951. In 1951, she married Willi Unsoeld, a mountaineer and later college professor; they had four children. Accompanying Willi to the Himalayas, she spent two years as director of an English-language education program for local residents in Kathmandu, Nepal in the early 1960s.

== Political career ==
=== Washington state politics ===
Unsoeld spent the 1970s and early 1980s as a citizen lobbyist in support of open government, including open public meetings and open public records. Her efforts led to the passing of Initiative 276 in 1972, and consequently the establishment of the Washington Public Disclosure Commission, and required disclosure of campaign contributions by candidates for elective office. In 1977 she and Willi became concerned about proposed nuclear power plants, and joined in forming Fair Electric Rates Now (FERN), which was a ratepayer and environmental group that worked for many years opposing utility investment in nuclear energy, encouraging investment in energy conservation, and supporting utility rate design that rewarded consumers who used less power. In 1984, she ran for the office of state representative, and served two terms in the Washington State Legislature prior to running for Congress in 1988. While EMILY's List described her as "the conscience" of the state legislature, she described herself as a "citizen meddler".

=== Congressional career ===
==== 1988 election ====
After Representative Don Bonker of the 3rd district decided to run for Senate in 1988, Unsoeld ran for the open seat to replace him. Unsoeld faced moderate Clark County Commissioner John McKibbin in the primary, who depicted Unsoeld as too liberal for the district. In the general election, Unsoeld narrowly defeated her Republican opponent by just 618 votes out of more than 218,000 votes cast.

Due to the close margin, Unsoeld's victory was only affirmed after a recount, five weeks after election day. Unsoeld's campaign was endorsed by EMILY's List, in what was described as one of the organization's early victories.

==== Tenure and 1994 defeat ====
Upon taking office, Unsoeld's first action was signing onto a gay-rights bill. During her three terms in Congress, she worked hardest on the federal Freedom of Information Act, but she became best known for her opposition to gun control despite being very liberal on other issues. Unsoeld opposed the North American Free Trade Agreement, arguing that it was insufficient in protecting the labor rights of both Mexican and American workers:

A NAFTA that fails to reverse Mexico's policy of menial wages and fails to bolster Mexican labor rights is bad news for their workers and bad news for our workers.

Notably, Unsoeld opposed the Violent Crime Control and Law Enforcement Act, generally referred to as the "1994 Crime Bill". She lost her bid for re-election in the Republican Revolution of 1994 to Linda Smith, in what was described as a "surprise" victory for her opponent. The 1994 campaign was noted for being unusually contentious, with Smith going so far as to suggest that Unsoeld's conservative father supported Smith's campaign over his daughter's.

== Later life and death ==
After leaving Congress, Unsoeld taught as a fellow at the Harvard Institute of Politics in the John F. Kennedy School of Government in the Fall of 1995. After teaching, she returned to Washington state and in October 1995 was appointed by Governor Mike Lowry to the Washington Fish and Wildlife Commission. She was reappointed in 1997 by Governor Gary Locke, however in February 1998 the State Senate refused to confirm her renomination after she argued that more restrictions on fishing were necessary to restore salmon runs.

In 2008, in recognition of her efforts to advance government transparency, the Washington Coalition for Open Government bestowed the James Madison Award on Unsoeld.

Unsoeld died in Olympia, Washington, on November 28, 2021, five days before her 90th birthday.

== See also ==
- Washington's congressional delegations
- Women in the United States House of Representatives

U.S. House of Representatives
Preceded by Don Bonker	Member of the U.S. House of Representatives from Washington's 3rd congressional district 1989–1995	Succeeded by Linda Smith
