= Richard Curtis (politician) =

American firefighter and politician (born 1959)

Member of the Washington House of Representatives from the 18th district
- In office January 10, 2005 – October 31, 2007
- Preceded by: Tom Mielke
- Succeeded by: Jaime Herrera Beutler

La Center City Council, Position No. 1
- In office January 1, 2002 – February 9, 2005
- Preceded by: Arvilla Bowen
- Succeeded by: Bill Birdwell Jr.

Personal details
- Born: Richard L. Curtis; March 8, 1959 (age 67) New Mexico, U.S.
- Party: Republican
- Spouse: Deborah
- Children: 2
- Education: Clark College; Portland Community College; Portland State University; University of Arizona; Western Oregon University
- Profession: Fire captain Paramedic; Small business owner

Military service
- Allegiance: United States
- Branch/service: United States Air Force

Richard L. Curtis (born March 8, 1959) is an American firefighter and politician from La Center, Washington. He served as a Republican member of the Washington State House of Representatives from Washington's 18th legislative district in Position 1 from 2005 to 2007. The district is located in rural Clark and Cowlitz counties.

== Election and voting record ==
Curtis was elected to the La Center City Council.

He was elected to the State House of Representatives on November 2, 2004, succeeding Republican Tom Mielke. Curtis faced no primary opposition, and won the general election with 56.5 percent of the vote in a race against Democratic candidate Pam Brokaw. He took office in January 2005 and was re-elected in 2006, winning with 59.1 percent of the vote against his Democratic opponent Jonathan Fant.

Curtis, who is married with two daughters, built up a socially conservative voting record while in office. In 2006, he opposed a gay rights bill that banned discrimination on the basis of sexual orientation. In spring 2007, he voted against domestic partnerships for gay and lesbian couples.

== Resignation ==
On October 30, 2007, the Spokesman-Review newspaper for the city of Spokane released the results of an investigation that established that Curtis had met another man, Cody Castagna, in an adult bookstore, with whom he later had sex in a local hotel room. Curtis was also alleged to have been seen previously and on that occasion clad in women's clothing, wearing them underneath his own.

According to a police statement from Curtis, Castagna attempted to extort $1,000 from him after the encounter in return for not revealing his "gay lifestyle" to his family. Based on this statement, Curtis brought formal extortion charges against Castagna. Castagna has denied all accusations of the extortion, which is a Class B felony. A statement by his lawyer asserted, "This is an extremely low-level situation that's being blown out of proportion by somebody who is trying to save themselves." The lawyer stated further that "this guy (Castagna) didn't do anything wrong – at that level, anyway." Curtis at first denied having had sex with the man, contradicting his own statements to police.

He resigned from the Washington State House of Representatives on October 31, 2007, and issued a statement:

Today I submitted my letter of resignation to Governor Gregoire effective immediately. While I believe we've done some good and helped a lot of people during the time I served in the Legislature, events that have recently come to light have hurt a lot of people. I sincerely apologize for any pain my actions may have caused. This has been damaging to my family, and I don't want to subject them to any additional pain that might result from carrying out this matter under the scrutiny that comes with holding public office.

According to analysis by The Olympian, the Republican leadership in the state moved to attempt to control the damage of Curtis's resignation, issuing statements of their own. State House Republican Leader Richard DeBolt said he was "disappointed" and that Curtis "can no longer effectively represent the constituents who elected him".
