= Linda Smith (American politician) =

American politician (born 1950)

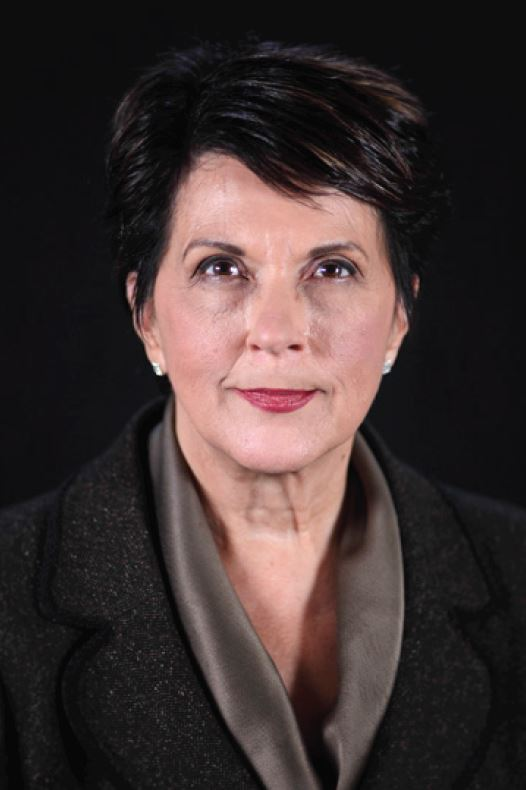

Member of the U.S. House of Representatives from Washington's 3rd district
- In office January 3, 1995 – January 3, 1999
- Preceded by: Jolene Unsoeld
- Succeeded by: Brian Baird

Member of the Washington Senate from the 18th district
- In office January 11, 1988 – January 2, 1995
- Preceded by: Joe Tanner
- Succeeded by: Hal Palmer

Member of the Washington House of Representatives from the 18th district
- In office January 9, 1984 – December 4, 1987
- Preceded by: Oliver Ristuben
- Succeeded by: Stan Butterfield

Personal details
- Born: Linda Ann Simpson; July 16, 1950 (age 76) La Junta, Colorado, U.S.
- Party: Republican

Linda Ann Smith (née Simpson; born July 16, 1950) is a member of the Republican Party who represented Washington's 3rd congressional district from 1995 to 1999 and was the unsuccessful Republican nominee for the U.S. Senate in 1998, losing to incumbent Democrat Patty Murray. After leaving politics, she founded Shared Hope International, a nonprofit organization focused on ending minor sex trafficking. Since its creation, Smith has worked around the world and within the United States on behalf of those who have been victimized through sex trafficking.

== Early and personal life ==
Smith grew up in a working class home. Her father abandoned the family and her mother remarried a mechanic, and in 1966 the family moved to Vancouver, Washington. Smith has an older sister, two younger sisters, and two younger brothers. In high school she had part-time jobs as a fruit picker and a day-care aide. She later recalled, "I felt like by 17, I had had more lives than most people." She was 24 years old when her mother died of cancer, leaving her two younger brothers at home.

In 1968, she married Vern Smith, a young locomotive engineer, and they raised two children. She became the manager of a number of independent tax offices in Southern Washington. She currently lives in Vancouver and has two children and six grandchildren.

== Political career ==
Smith began her political career in a special election in 1983 when she defeated a Democratic Party incumbent to win a seat in the Washington House of Representatives. In 1987, she moved up to the state Senate, giving Republicans control of that chamber, and remained there until her supporters began a September 1994 write-in campaign to elect her to Washington's 3rd congressional district, after Republican candidate Tim Moyer suddenly dropped out of the race. Smith began a 19-day-long grassroots campaign that resulted in her defeating the only Republican candidate listed on the primary ballot. Having secured a ballot line as the Republican nominee through her September write-in campaign, she went on to defeat liberal three-term Democrat Jolene Unsoeld in November. She narrowly won reelection in 1996, defeating Democrat Brian Baird by only 887 votes.

Smith was known for her anti-abortion stance, opposing the Balanced Budget Amendment, supporting campaign finance reform being one of 9 House Republicans to vote against confirming House Speaker Newt Gingrich in early 1997. She also had a reputation for opposing gay rights and viewed homosexuality as a "morally unfit inclination."

In November 1997, Smith was one of eighteen Republicans in the House to co-sponsor a resolution by Bob Barr that sought to launch an impeachment inquiry against President Bill Clinton. The resolution did not specify any charges or allegations. This was an early effort to impeach Clinton, predating the eruption of the Clinton–Lewinsky scandal. The eruption of that scandal would ultimately lead to a more serious effort to impeach Clinton in 1998. On October 8, 1998, Smith voted in favor of legislation that was passed to open an impeachment inquiry. On December 19, 1998, Smith voted in favor of all four proposed articles of impeachment against Clinton (only two of which received the majority of votes needed to be adopted).

Giving up her House seat in 1998, Smith ran for Washington's Class 3 U.S. Senate seat. She defeated former King County Prosecuting Attorney Chris Bayley to face sitting U.S. Senator Patty Murray, only the third Senate race between two women. Ultimately Murray won by a 58%-to-42% margin.

== Shared Hope International ==
In the fall of 1998, while still a member of the U.S. Congress, Smith traveled to Falkland Road in Mumbai (formerly Bombay), India, which is one of the worst brothel districts in the world. The hopeless faces of desperate women and children forced into prostitution compelled her to found Shared Hope International (SHI), a non-profit organization dedicated to eradicating sex-trafficking. Since Smith's retirement from Congress, she has devoted her energy to this cause, traveling around the world to prevent, restore, and bring justice to victims of trafficking. Shared Hope supports shelter and service creation for sex trafficking survivors using a comprehensive model for restoration. By partnering with local organizations, Shared Hope provides restorative care, shelter, education, and job skills training at Homes and Villages of Hope where women and children can live without time limit. Today, Shared Hope provides leadership in awareness and training, prevention strategies, restorative care, research, and policy initiatives to mobilize a national network of protection for victims.

=== War Against Trafficking Alliance ===
To build momentum in the international anti-trafficking movement, Smith also founded the War Against Trafficking Alliance (WATA) in January 2001. WATA coordinates both regional and international efforts necessary to combat sex trafficking. In February 2003, WATA co-sponsored a World Summit with the U.S. Department of State, which brought together non-government and government leaders from 114 nations, all demonstrating a sustained commitment to prosecuting trafficking, providing assistance to victims, and building regional strategies to protect the vulnerable from the sex trade. In 2005, WATA was invited to participate, along with UNIFEM, in the first ASEAN conference to address child sex tourism in East and Southeast Asia.

=== DEMAND. ===
With a grant from the U.S. Department of State, Office to Monitor and Combat Trafficking in Persons, Smith and her team have worked in the field conducting research in Jamaica, the Netherlands, Japan, and the United States in order to reveal the sophisticated business model behind sex trafficking, exposing the buyers who increase demand and the traffickers who supply the victims. This extensive research led to SHI's release of the DEMAND. report and documentary in 2007.

=== Domestic Minor Sex Trafficking ===
In response to the findings from the DEMAND. report, since 2006 Smith and Shared Hope International have partnered with Anti-Trafficking Task Forces in ten U.S. cities with funding from the U.S Department of Justice, to identify and provide services to American victims of Domestic Minor Sex Trafficking (DMST). The National Report on Domestic Minor Sex Trafficking: America's Prostituted Children, also released by SHI, compiled all of the information obtained throughout four years of research in America. It examines the governmental and nongovernmental efforts and gaps in addressing child sex trafficking in the United States.

=== Renting Lacy ===
After over a decade of undercover investigations, extensive research and conducting thousands of survivor interviews, Smith herself was "shocked" by what was revealed. In 2009, Smith released a book titled Renting Lacy: A Story of America's Prostituted Children, which explores the traumas endured by young girls who are used in the commercial sex industry.

=== Chosen ===
Smith developed Chosen, a youth sex trafficking prevention film series, after contributing to the rescue of an 18-year-old female who was unknowingly targeted by a trafficker and in immediate danger of being sold. Smith produced Chosen to teach teens the warning signs and indicators of trafficking through the true stories of teenage girls who were tricked by traffickers. Brianna, Lacy and Maria discuss how modern American pimps and gangs are luring youth into the commercial sex industry and how teens can protect themselves and others from being chosen. The resource packages include additional educational tools to further discussion, learning and action.

=== Demanding Justice Project ===
The Demanding Justice Project was developed and directed by Smith as a targeted campaign to promote demand deterrence through increased attention and advocacy on demand. The research report documents the outcomes of federal and state arrests, charges and prosecutions of buyers of sex acts with children. The corresponding campaign website, www.demandingjustice.org, contains information about buyers convicted of purchasing sex with a minor.

== Media/public appearances ==
As an expert on trafficking, Smith has spoken out against the trafficking of women and children in numerous Congressional hearings and in national and international forums, such as the World Conference on Trafficking, Congressional Hearing on the International Violence Against Women Act along with Ambassador Melanee Verveer and UNIFEM Goodwill Ambassador Nicole Kidman, and the U.S.-Russia Bilateral Presidential Commission on the Protection of Children. At the Helsinki Commission Hearing in 2006, Smith testified about the Commercial sexual exploitation of children (CSEC) in America. She has appeared on CNN, MSNBC, USA Today, Dan Rather Reports, ABC News, the Dr. Phil Show, O'Reilly Factor, and CBN. She received the 2009 Soroptimist Making a Difference for Women Award and the 2010 Soroptimist Ruby Award: For Women Helping Women. Smith has been published in news outlets and journals around the world; including The New York Times, the Fletcher Forum of World Affairs, the International Review of Penal Law, and the Regent University Law Review.

== See also ==
- Women in the United States House of Representatives

== Bibliography ==
- Smith, Linda (2009). Renting Lacy: A Story of America's Prostituted Children. Shared Hope International. ISBN 978-0-9765594-6-7.

== Electoral history ==
- 1998 Race for U.S. Senate
  - Patty Murray (D) (inc.), 58%
  - Linda Smith (R), 42%

U.S. House of Representatives
Preceded by Jolene Unsoeld	Member of the U.S. House of Representatives from Washington's 3rd congressional district 1995–1999	Succeeded by Brian Baird
Party political offices
Preceded by Rod Chandler	Republican nominee for U.S. Senator from Washington (Class 3); 1998	Succeeded by George Nethercutt
U.S. order of precedence (ceremonial)
Preceded by Matt Rosendale as Former U.S. Representative	Order of precedence of the United States as Former U.S. Representative	Succeeded by Rick White as Former U.S. Representative
