= 1998 United States Senate election in Washington =

- November 3, 1998
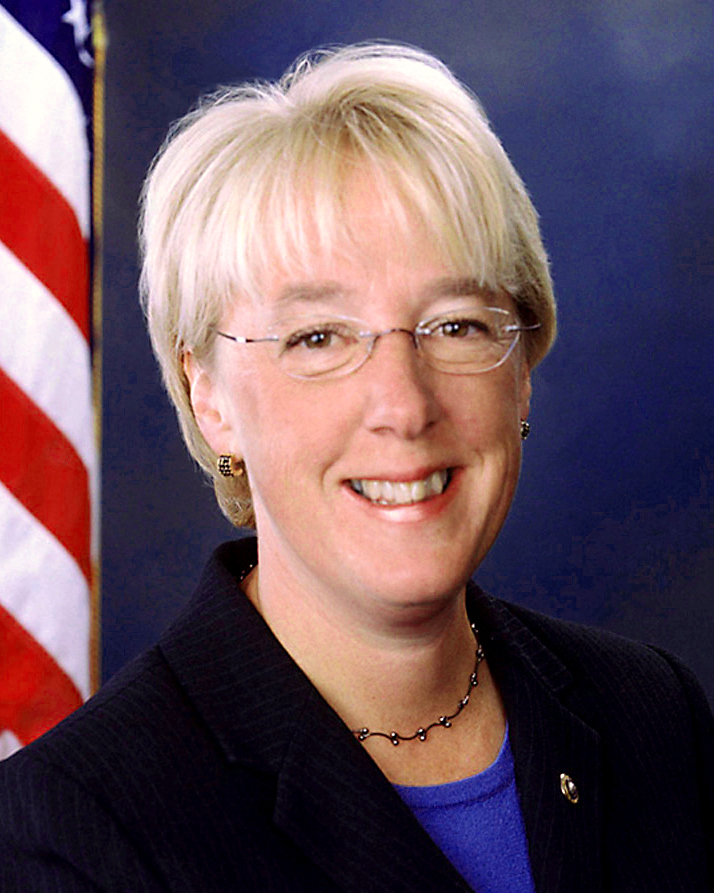

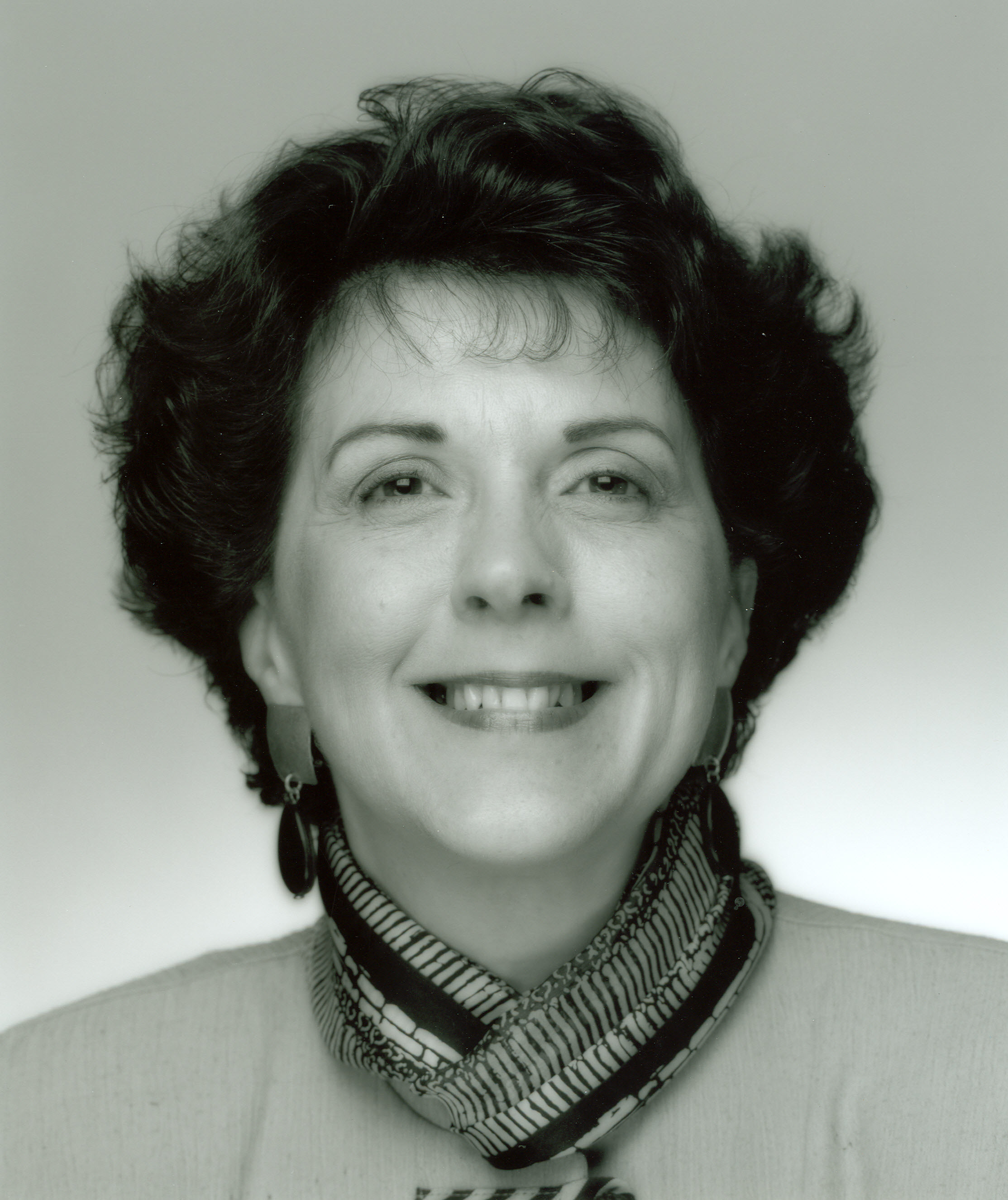
Nominee	Patty Murray	Linda Smith
Party	Democratic	Republican
Popular vote	1,103,184	785,377
Percentage	58.41%	41.59%
- County results Murray: 50–60% 60–70% Smith: 50–60%
U.S. senator before election
Patty Murray
Democratic
Elected U.S. Senator
Patty Murray
Democratic

The 1998 United States Senate election in Washington was held on November 3, 1998. Democratic incumbent Patty Murray won re-election to a second term over Republican Congresswoman Linda Smith.

== General election ==
=== Candidates ===
- Patty Murray, incumbent U.S. senator since 1993 (Democratic)
- Linda Smith, U.S. representative from Vancouver (Republican)

=== Polling ===
Poll source	Date(s)	Sample size (Note: Key: A – all adults RV – registered voters LV – likely voters V – unclear)	Margin of error	Patty Murray (D)	Linda Smith (R)	Other / undecided (Note: Calculated by taking the difference of 100% and all other candidates combined.)
Harris Insights & Analytics	October 30, 1998	1,523	—	53%	45%	2%
Mason-Dixon Polling & Strategy	October 26–27, 1998	801 (LV)	± 3.5%	49%	41%	10%
Harris Insights & Analytics	October 20, 1998	831	—	54%	41%	5%
Mason-Dixon Polling & Strategy	October 5–6, 1998	810 (LV)	± 3.5%	51%	38%	11%
Elway Research	September 18–19, 1998	475 (V)	± 4.5%	44%	37%	19%
Mason-Dixon Polling & Strategy	September 8–9, 1998	812 (LV)	± 3.5%	51%	35%	14%

=== Results ===
Despite polling showing a consistent single-digit lead for Murray, the election was not close, with Murray winning by 16.8 percentage points. Murray won in a landslide victory by racking up huge margins in Western Washington. Specifically, Murray trounced Smith in the state’s most populous county, King County. Murray also won six counties in the historically conservative eastern part of the state.

1998 United States Senate election in Washington
Party	Candidate	Votes	%	±%
Democratic	Patty Murray (incumbent)	1,103,184	58.41%	▲4.42
Republican	Linda Smith	785,377	41.59%	▼4.42
Total votes		1,888,561	100.00%	N/A
Democratic hold				

==== By county ====
County results
County	Patty Murray Democratic		Linda Smith Republican		Margin		Total votes
County	#	%	#	%	#	%	Total votes
Adams	1,566	42.97%	2,078	57.03%	-512	-14.05%	3,644
Asotin	3,054	52.06%	2,812	47.94%	242	4.13%	5,866
Benton	20,072	46.54%	23,052	53.46%	-2,980	-6.91%	43,124
Chelan	8,907	42.95%	11,830	57.05%	-2,923	-14.10%	20,737
Clallam	14,452	53.79%	12,417	46.21%	2,035	7.57%	26,869
Clark	46,251	47.85%	50,412	52.15%	-4,161	-4.30%	96,663
Columbia	756	44.16%	956	55.84%	-200	-11.68%	1,712
Cowlitz	15,446	53.32%	13,524	46.68%	1,922	6.63%	28,970
Douglas	3,800	42.18%	5,208	57.82%	-1,408	-15.63%	9,008
Ferry	1,339	50.62%	1,306	49.38%	33	1.25%	2,645
Franklin	4,621	44.40%	5,786	55.60%	-1,165	-11.19%	10,407
Garfield	596	47.64%	655	52.36%	-59	-4.72%	1,251
Grant	7,430	41.88%	10,310	58.12%	-2,880	-16.23%	17,740
Grays Harbor	13,388	62.85%	7,914	37.15%	5,474	25.70%	21,302
Island	13,639	54.52%	11,378	45.48%	2,261	9.04%	25,017
Jefferson	7,820	61.90%	4,813	38.10%	3,007	23.80%	12,633
King	405,177	67.11%	198,592	32.89%	206,585	34.22%	603,769
Kitsap	48,122	58.63%	33,956	41.37%	14,166	17.26%	82,078
Kittitas	5,469	50.85%	5,286	49.15%	183	1.70%	10,755
Klickitat	2,914	46.25%	3,387	53.75%	-473	-7.51%	6,301
Lewis	10,045	40.60%	14,697	59.40%	-4,652	-18.80%	24,742
Lincoln	2,042	46.37%	2,362	53.63%	-320	-7.27%	4,404
Mason	10,808	59.32%	7,413	40.68%	3,395	18.63%	18,221
Okanogan	5,209	45.04%	6,355	54.96%	-1,146	-9.91%	11,564
Pacific	5,027	63.43%	2,898	36.57%	2,129	26.86%	7,925
Pend Oreille	2,439	51.68%	2,280	48.32%	159	3.37%	4,719
Pierce	118,660	58.53%	84,057	41.47%	34,603	17.07%	202,717
San Juan	4,471	64.19%	2,494	35.81%	1,977	28.38%	6,965
Skagit	18,964	54.86%	15,602	45.14%	3,362	9.73%	34,566
Skamania	1,586	48.00%	1,718	52.00%	-132	-4.00%	3,304
Snohomish	106,917	58.15%	76,959	41.85%	29,958	16.29%	183,876
Spokane	67,901	53.58%	58,817	46.42%	9,084	7.17%	126,718
Stevens	5,759	42.68%	7,734	57.32%	-1,975	-14.64%	13,493
Thurston	48,132	62.14%	29,320	37.86%	18,812	24.29%	77,452
Wahkiakum	991	53.28%	869	46.72%	122	6.56%	1,860
Walla Walla	7,348	47.48%	8,128	52.52%	-780	-5.04%	15,476
Whatcom	30,843	55.41%	24,825	44.59%	6,018	10.81%	55,668
Whitman	6,937	54.41%	5,813	45.59%	1,124	8.82%	12,750
Yakima	24,286	47.02%	27,364	52.98%	-3,078	-5.96%	51,650
Totals	1,103,184	58.41%	785,377	41.59%	317,807	16.83%	1,888,561

==== Counties that flipped from Democratic to Republican ====
- Clark (largest city: Vancouver)
- Klickitat (largest city: Goldendale)
- Skamania (largest city: Carson)

==== Counties that flipped from Republican to Democratic ====
- Asotin (largest city: Clarkston)
- Clallam (largest city: Port Angeles)
- Ferry (largest city: Republic)
- Kitsap (largest city: Bremerton)
- Pend Oreille (largest city: Newport)
- Spokane (largest city: Spokane)
- Whitman (largest city: Pullman)

== See also ==
- 1998 United States Senate elections
