= Joseph Zarelli =

American politician from Washington state

Member of the Washington Senate from the 18th district
- In office December 11, 1995 – May 31, 2012
- Preceded by: Hal Palmer
- Succeeded by: Ann Rivers

Personal details
- Born: Joseph Peter Zarelli; October 7, 1961 (age 64) Tacoma, Washington, U.S.
- Party: Republican
- Spouse(s): Lori Michele Harrison (1982–1983); Tani Bertelsen (1985–2014) Maribel Ramirez (2015)
- Education: Clark College (AA)
- Profession: Business president

Military service
- Allegiance: United States
- Branch/service: United States Navy
- Years of service: 1982 – 1989 (7 years)

Joseph Peter Zarelli ([tsaˈrelli]; born October 7, 1961) is an American former politician of the Republican Party. He was a member of the Washington State Senate representing Washington's 18th legislative district from 1995 to 2012.

== Political career ==
After serving as a top Senate Republican for several years, Zarelli announced his retirement at the end of his current term on May 19, 2012.

Jaime Herrera was an intern in Zarelli's office and he was a major supporter of her rise in politics.

== Personal information ==
According to his official Legislative biography, Senator Zarelli owns a company specializing in business development and risk management services. He served in the U.S. Navy from 1982 to 1989. He earned an Associate's degree from Clark College in 1991. Joe and his wife Tani, have four daughters and two grandchildren. The couple filed petitions for divorce and for legal separation in November 2013.

== Political controversies ==
Zarelli was briefly dogged by controversy in 2002 when the Seattle Times reported on the fact that he collected unemployment while simultaneously serving in the State Legislature. This was seen as especially embarrassing because Zarelli had a well-established political identity as a fiscal conservative. Zarelli defended himself by arguing that the State Employment Security Department had found him to be eligible for benefits, and there were never any allegations of unsavory dealings behind the awarding of benefits. The controversy soon passed.
