= Lincoln High School (Tacoma, Washington) =

Location
- 701 South 37th Street; Tacoma, Washington 98418; United States; 47°13′30″N 122°26′25″W

Information
- Former name: Lincoln Park High School
- School type: Public
- Established: September 1914; 112 years ago
- Status: open
- School district: Tacoma Public Schools
- NCES School ID: 530870001476
- Principal: Donald Crider
- Teaching staff: 81.09 (FTE)
- Grades: 9–12
- Enrollment: 1,529 (2023–2024)
- Student to teacher ratio: 18.86
- Campus type: Closed
- Colors: Black & Yellow
- Mascot: Abe
- Nickname: Abes
- Newspaper: The Lincoln Ledger Newsletter
- Website: lincoln.tacomaschools.org/

Lincoln High School is a historic high school located in the south central sector of Tacoma, Washington, adjacent to Lincoln Park. Part of Tacoma Public Schools, it was named for Abraham Lincoln, the sixteenth President of the United States. The school was founded in 1913 and built according to an architectural design by Frederick Heath. It celebrated its Centennial Jubilee in 2014.

== History ==
After a favorable bond vote by the people on September 2, 1911, the school board of Tacoma Public Schools chose the present site for a new high school. Originally called Lincoln Park High School, it adjoined city park property that was turned over to the school board without charge. The cost of the ground, nearly ten acres, was less than $424,000; the building, $438,000. With equipment, the total investment was about half a million dollars.

On Labor Day, September 1, 1913, the cornerstone was laid; by September 1914, classes began. In the spring of 1915, 98 students were graduated. Enrollment gradually increased, until in 1938 there were about 3,100 students, 709 graduating. When the auditorium could no longer accommodate the graduation exercises, they were held in the Helig Theater (now the Temple) from 1929 to 1932, graduation was moved to the Armory, and then to the University of Puget Sound Field house, and finally to the Tacoma Dome.

== Architecture ==
Frederick Heath, the architect behind Lincoln High School, Stadium High School, and other noteworthy buildings in Tacoma, sent his partner George Gove around the U.S. to study other schools before designing Lincoln. They wanted it to be state of the art. Style was also considered vital. The architectural inspiration was that of the Eton College in England. The school was built primarily in a Collegiate Gothic style, meant to show a school building that would inspire and last. Carved in Wilkeson sandstone above the doorways were inspirational words such as courage, reverence, grace and "Labor omnia vincit" (Labor Conquers All Things).

The building was organized with the three wings of the main building in the shape of the letter Y. The Drost Auditorium, named for Lincoln class of 1938 alumna and former Tacoma School Board President, Betty Drost, is conveniently located for both public gatherings and quick access from classrooms. The clock tower is the dominant feature of the school. With a four-sided clock face, it stands two stories above the school, featuring a flagpole at the top and the year 1913 raised in stone on one side, which can be seen from G Street.

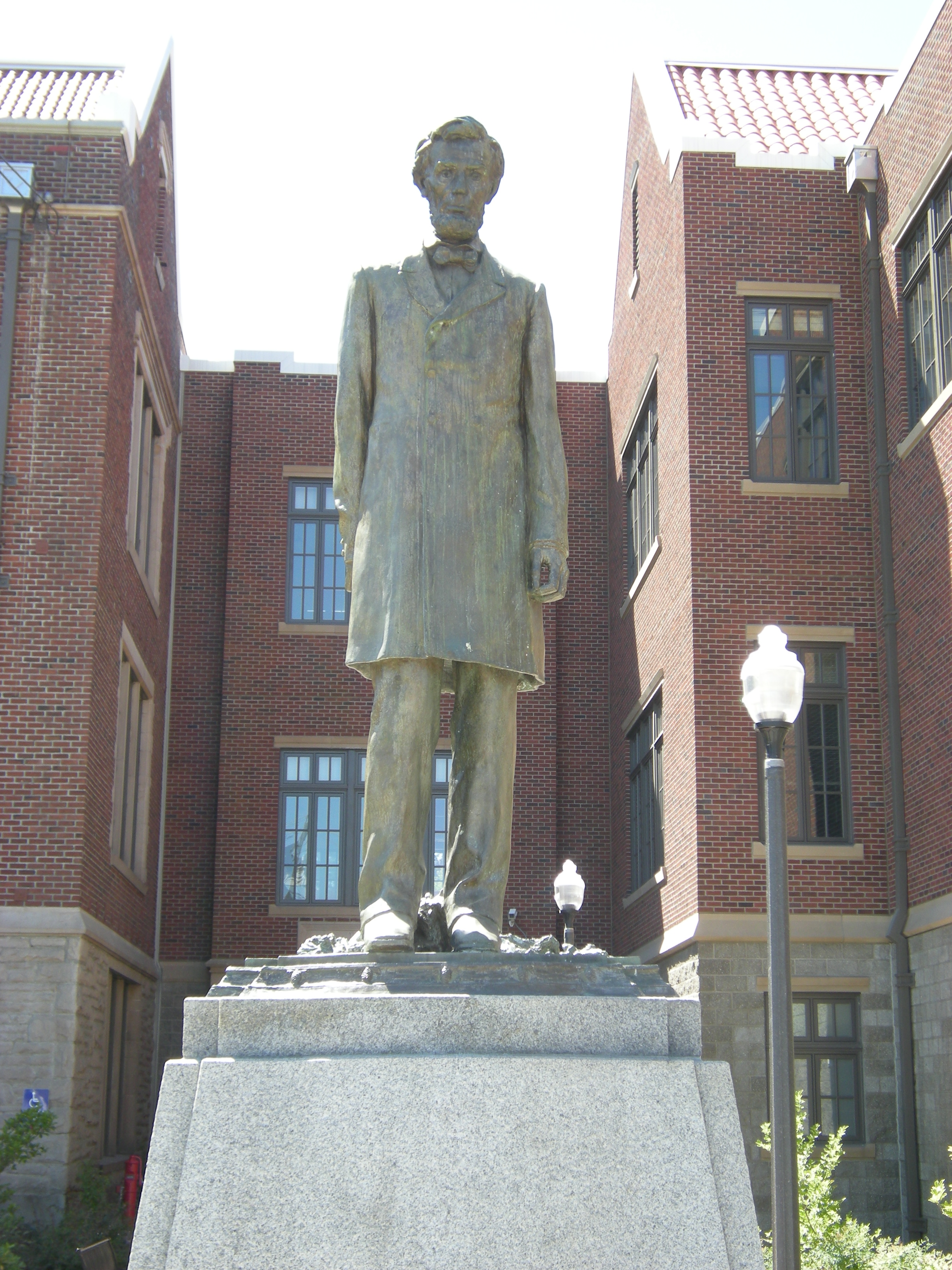
Statue of Abraham Lincoln, sculpted by Alonzo Victor Lewis

On the grounds, the most distinguishing feature is Alonzo Victor Lewis' statue of Lincoln, unveiled February 12, 1918. The purchase price of $4,000 was made possible by contributions from Tacoma Public Schools and patriotic organizations.

The inscriptions over the entrances - Reverence, Justice, Goodwill, and Simplicity (an addition to the school building added Mercy over a new entrance in 1998) - were suggested by the architects and were inspired by similar words which Bishop Keater, in a baccalaureate address at the university, designated as "gateways of the ideal democracy the public school aims to build."

Lincoln High School was substantially renovated in 2007. Designed by K-12 architectural firm DLR Group, the renovation added a new academic building to support Lincoln's transition to a Small Learning Community based curriculum. The exterior renovations including returning the school's original front door entrance; restoration of the iconic clock tower; and restoration of the Justice Arch as the connection between the original school and the new addition.

== Area ==
Tacoma's two Federal Empowerment Zones lie within the school's attendance area. The Lincoln International Business District is one block from the school. The Tacoma Mall and the city's largest commercial/retail sector are found less than 2 miles (3.2 km) to the west.

== Events in school history and the Lincoln Bowl ==
On August 31, 1914, the school day was set to begin at 9 a.m., but so many students showed up early to get a peek at the new high school that Principal W.W Parker opened the doors at 7:30 a.m. to let them explore. The walls of the short hallway on the left of the central hub were not yet covered with pictures because there had not yet been a graduating class to display there. But someone thought it was a good idea to hang one as soon as there was a graduation. Once one picture was hung, it was fitting for each new class to join their fellow alums on the wall. Those frames were taken down for the renovation. Though they were replaced after the construction was finished, Lincoln stopped placing graduation class photos on the walls after the class of 2005 graduated.

In the 1920s, the stadium was used for Tacoma City League baseball.

Elvis Presley performed at the Lincoln Bowl in 1957.

Retired NFL quarterback Jon Kitna joined the staff of Lincoln High School from January 2012 through June 2015, teaching mathematics. In addition, he was hired as varsity football head coach. In 2015, Kitna accepted a position coaching football at Waxahachie High School in Texas.

The visit of Chinese leader Xi Jinping in September 2015 provided opportunities for students to explore Chinese music, government and culture.

== Notable people ==
=== Faculty ===
- Sugar Ray Seales, Olympic Boxer
- Terry Bergeson, State Superintendent of Public Instruction 1996-2007
- Jon Kitna, NFL quarterback 1997–2013, math teacher and head football coach 2013–2015

=== Alumni ===
- Philip Abelson (1913-2004) Class of 1925, Manhattan Project physicist and scientific editor
- Lee Artoe, NFL and AAFC football player, 1946–1948
- Roberta Byrd Barr, civil rights leader, first woman principal of Seattle Public Schools, moderator of KCTS and KING-5 "Face to Face"
- Carmen Best, Police Chief of Seattle (2018–2020)
- Pappy Boyington, U.S. fighter pilot and Medal of Honor recipient
- James E. Brau, Class of 1965, particle physicist, professor of physics at the University of Oregon
- Brandon Brown (born 1989), basketball player for Hapoel Jerusalem of the Israeli Basketball Premier League
- Wade Cook, author and ignominious financial guru
- Robert W. Copeland, Class of 1918. RADM USNR Navy Cross recipient. Ship namesake
- AJ Gil, singer-songwriter, who placed eighth on the first season of American Idol
- Frank Herbert, writer, author of Dune series
- Bobby "Wheezer" Hutchins, child actor and former Our Gang member
- Vince Hanson, All-American college basketball player
- Jim Jones, American football player
- Jon Kitna, NFL quarterback 1996–2013
- Stafford Mays, NFL defensive lineman 1980–1988
- Lawyer Milloy, NFL strong safety 1996–2010
- Alex Montgomery, WNBA basketball player
- Brad Owen, Lt. Governor of Washington State 1997–2017
- Phil Sarboe, American football player (1934–1936) and coached Washington State Cougars and Humboldt State Lumberjacks
- Bill Sewell, American football and baseball player, coach, athletic director
- Frank Stojack, American football player, pro wrestler, politician, sheriff
- Thor C. Tollefson, U.S. Representative 1947–1965
- Steve Whitaker, Major League Baseball outfielder (1966–1970)
- Dave Williams, NFL wide receiver 1967–1974
- Victoria Woodards, mayor of Tacoma, Washington and former member of the Tacoma City Council
