= Victoria Woodards =

American politician (born 1965)

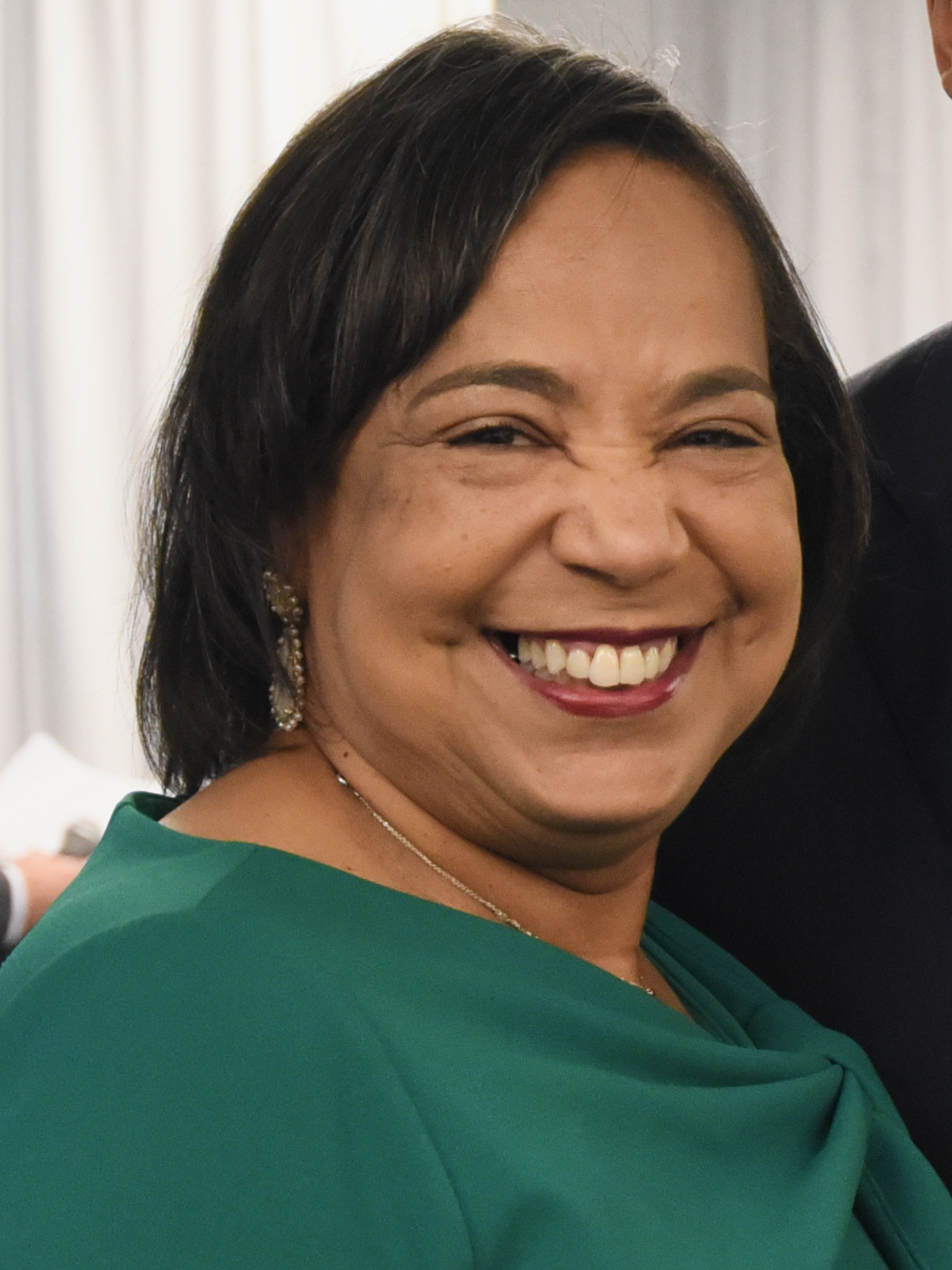

39th Mayor of Tacoma
- In office January 2, 2018 – January 6, 2026
- Preceded by: Marilyn Strickland
- Succeeded by: Anders Ibsen

97th President of National League of Cities
- In office 2023
- Preceded by: Vince Williams
- Succeeded by: David Sander

Personal details
- Born: July 16, 1965 (age 61)
- Party: Democratic

Military service
- Allegiance: United States
- Branch/service: United States Army

Victoria R. Woodards (born July 16, 1965) is an American politician and a member of the Democratic Party, who served as the 39th mayor of Tacoma, Washington. Prior to her tenure as mayor, she served for seven years as an at-large member of the Tacoma City Council.

== Early life and education ==
Victoria (Vicky) Woodards was born on July 16, 1965, to Cornelius and Valerie Woodards in Riverside, California. During her childhood, the Woodards family moved to London, England before settling in Tacoma, Washington due to Cornelius serving in the United States Air Force. In high school, Woodards joined Junior Reserve Officers' Training Corps at Lincoln High School in Tacoma, WA. She graduated from Lincoln in 1983 and enlisted in the United States Army shortly after. Victoria attended basic training in Fort Dix, New Jersey before being stationed at Fort Lewis, which is located on the outskirts of Tacoma. Woodards took classes at Pierce College throughout the 1980s and 1990s, yet stopped her educational career just 7 credits short of the 90 credits needed to graduate with an associate degree from Pierce College. While being enrolled at Pierce College, Woodards took classes at City University. Up until her 2017 Mayoral Campaign, Woodards was under the impression that she obtained her associate degree from Pierce College due to her additional credits from City University. However, Woodards walked in Pierce College's graduation and is honored as one of Pierce College's distinguished alumnae.

=== Early professional life in politics ===
Before making the transition to politics, Woodards worked in the business world. During an interview with the Association of Washington Cities, Woodards recalled how she was offered to apply at the Tacoma Urban League "which changed her life". In 1997, Woodards began working as Harold Moss' assistant at the Urban League. Woodards accredits Moss for her role in politics and says that he was her "mentor." Woodards was then appointed and elected to parks commissioner in 2004, serving on the board for Metro Parks Tacoma. In 2009, she was elected to an at-large member position on Tacoma's City Council. As a member of the City Council, Woodards influenced the establishment of the city's Office of Equity and Human Rights by proposing the Equity and Empowerment initiative. In 2011, Woodards became the president of Tacoma Urban League. Woodards held her position as president and CEO of Tacoma Urban League until March 2017. Woodards was elected as chairwomen on the Tacoma-Pierce County Board of Health in 2014. During the 2015 Tacoma City Council Election, Woodards endorsed candidate Keith Blocker, for District 3. After Woodards announced to the public that she would be running for mayor, it was reported that 55 people were competing for her spot on Tacoma City Council.

On July 16, 2016, Woodards published a piece in the opinion section of The News Tribune. The title of the article Woodards published was "Forget us vs. them; racial healing starts with me". The article depicts her feelings of recent incidents of police brutality of African-American men at the time. Within the article, she also voices that people have "more in common than they think" and hopes that members of Tacoma's community can "get to know each other better".

=== Personal life ===
In 2014, over Labor Day weekend, Woodards' home caught on fire. Her home suffered a complete loss with damages estimating to be $225,000. The News Tribune reported that everyone in the home was safe, as well as Woodards' pet dog Gimzo. Woodards' friends posted on GoFundMe to fundraise on her behalf and stated that Woodards "lost everything in the fire" in the fundraiser's description.

== Mayoral campaign platform and electoral history ==
=== 2017 mayoral campaign ===
The 2017 mayoral election was Tacoma's first open seat election in 8 years. After stepping down from her role on the City Council, Woodards ran for mayor against a local architect named Jim Merritt. During this election, it was mentioned by some of Woodards supporters that Woodards had been facing racial criticism during this campaign. In the midst of the campaign, Woodards also faced claims that she "falsely stated" that she had an associate degree from Pierce College. Woodards never published or claimed to have an associate degree to the public, only stating it once within her application to be appointed for Metro Parks Tacoma open seat in 2004. Voter-guides provided for previous elections where Woodards was a candidate, as well as the 2017 mayoral election voter-guide, only stated that Woodards was a graduate of Lincoln High School. Woodards public LinkedIn states in the description that she is a "professional who graduated from Lincoln High School". When reporting on the claims against Woodards, The News Tribune, stated that Woodards political opponents "believed" that the news outlet was "withholding information from voters" and had a bias toward Woodards.

Woodards had the endorsements of Tacoma's current outgoing mayor, Marilyn Strickland, along with the rest of the city council. Woodards said her primary concerns as mayor would entail reinvesting in Public Safety, increasing Tacoma's safety net for the homeless and those with mental health issues, and bringing family wage jobs to Tacoma. Woodards endorsed the proposed Liquid Natural Gas facility, which had been a controversial matter, for Tacoma's tide flats. Merritt, who had been endorsed by the Sierra Club of Washington, was not in support of the Liquid Natural Gas proposal.

Woodards was elected with 19,186 votes, and Merritt received 16,090 votes. This was the most expensive mayoral campaign in Tacoma's history.

=== 2021 mayoral campaign ===
As an incumbent, Woodards ran against Steve Haverly, who works in construction management. Woodards was in favor of a plan which would allow for more multifamily housing throughout the city called Home in Tacoma. Haverly did not support the Home in Tacoma plan, and instead wanted to focus on developing downtown Tacoma and restoring the neighborhoods character. With the election taking place around the COVID-19 pandemic, Haverly stated that the city was "like a ghost town" due to downtown business closures. Woodards said she disagreed with Haverly, and ensured that the city issued loans and grants to many businesses to keep them running. Woodards won reelection with 58% of the votes.

== Mayoral career ==
Victoria Woodards was first elected as mayor of Tacoma in the year 2017, and won a second term in 2021. She serves on the advisory board of the United States Conference of Mayors and is vice-chair of the organization's Committee on Jobs, Education, and the Workforce.

=== Initiatives, programs and campaigns established during mayoral terms ===
In 2021, Woodards along with Tacoma Deputy Mayor John Hines launched Tidy-Up Tacoma. Tidy-Up Tacoma is a citywide initiative meant to help stop excessive street waste and vandalism. The initiative is meant to bring volunteers together to "clean up" the city of Tacoma.

Growing Resilience in Tacoma (GRIT) was also established by Woodards in 2021. GRIT is an income program meant to serve low-income residents of Tacoma. GRIT is a guaranteed income program and states that for "for no less than 12 months participants will receive $500 a month". The program began recruiting participants in June and July 2021. The Guaranteed Income Pilots Dashboard reports that there are "110 employed participants that are between 100% and 200% on the federal poverty line" in the program. GRIT was funded both privately and publicly; using Tacoma's $500,000 share of the 15 million dollars that Jack Dorsey donated to Mayors for Guaranteed Income (MGI) as well as $100,000 from a collaboration with United Way of Pierce County. The GRIT program was set to end in November 2022. However, GRIT opened applications to residents that met the criteria once again on March 1, 2024. The purpose of the GRIT is to redefine the story of those within poverty systems as well as to help provide those who are "Asset Limited, Isolated, Constricted and Employed" with resources.

Woodards also helped launch the Safe Youth Campaign in 2022, which focused on the spike of violence among youth in Tacoma.

Woodards alongside April Black, who is the executive director of Tacoma Housing Authority, co-wrote and published an article in The News Tribune titled "Tacoma is desperate for more affordable housing. To build it we need the state’s help". The article outlined the work that Woodards and Tacoma City Council have done to help support the heightened cost of living in Tacoma. The article discusses recent implementations of policies such as Home in Tacoma. Home in Tacoma is a residential policy that allows for more than one unit to be added to single-family homes in Tacoma. However, Woodards urges legislators within the article that more financial support is needed from the state to help curb this problem.

=== Manuel Ellis' death ===
On March 3, 2020, an unarmed black man, Manuel Ellis, died while in Tacoma police custody. In June of that year when the video was released to the public by a bystander, Mayor Woodards directed the city manager to fire the four officers in the video, and called for an immediate investigation. The Tacoma police union raised concern about the mayor's premature decision before an investigation was completed. After an investigation by the Pierce County Sheriff's Office, the death was ruled a homicide. January 2024, the 3 officers involved in Ellis’ death were acquitted on the counts of murder and manslaughter. They voluntarily resigned for a city payout of $500,000.

=== Tacoma police chief investigation ===
In October 2024, Mayor Woodards voiced her support for Tacoma Police Chief Avery Moore after being placed on administrative leave for his personal use of a city asset. Furthermore, Woodards acknowledged her appreciation for the city's engagement and concern of the matter. She pledged transparency throughout the investigation.

=== Reformat of State of the City Address ===
The state of the city address is traditionally a formal, annual address issued by the mayor to their council, local officials and leaders, and residents. The address provides the mayor an opportunity to lay out their vision for the future of the city and reflect on past milestones. In 2024, Woodards announces a reformatted approach to the address. Instead of the usual format, she invited residents to a local high school, where she and other local officials would engage directly with the public at "Feedback Stations," allowing attendees to ask questions and share their concerns. "The new format allows us to continue to hear directly from residents, but in a different and focused way that gives us a foundation to really weave in a tailored response that engages the public in a positive dialogue over the summer," Woodards said.

=== Racist harassment ===
During a November 2023 city council meeting, several callers spewed racist and anti-semitic slurs during the public comment period. One caller hurled the N-world at the mayor. She then proceeded to de-escalate the situation by acknowledging the caller for his question and informing him that his microphone would be muted. The council took a brief recess and later voted to forgo the second half of the public comment.

=== Involvement during mayoral terms outside of Tacoma ===
As Tacoma Mayor, Woodards, was involved with urban leadership at the local and national level. In 2022, Woodards was elected President of the National League of Cities. The National League of Cities (NLC) is an organization of city, town and village leaders.

Although her term was one year as president of the NLC, Woodards continued with her local leadership in the city of Tacoma. Woodards created the first Youth Commission for Tacoma and expanded Student Government Day.

In June 2024, Woodards travelled to China for a sisters city summit organized by the Chinese People's Association for Friendship with Foreign Countries. During a May 2025 trip to China, she toured a Comac facility in Shanghai and praised the Chinese government for "safeguarding" religious liberty.

=== Endorsements as mayor of Tacoma ===
In October 2022, Tacoma City Council voted to pass an ordinance banning homeless encampments that were set up within less than 10 blocks away from one of Tacoma's temporary homeless shelter. Woodards offered her support for this ordinance stating that it is meant to "help people accept services that are offered".

In the 2020 Democratic Party presidential primaries, Woodards initially supported former New York City Mayor Michael Bloomberg before endorsing Joe Biden.

=== Financial affairs statement lapse ===
In 2022, it was reported that Woodards had failed to file her personal financial affairs statement in a timely matter. The Washington Public Disclosure Commission reported that this happened two years in a row and fined her $500.

== Awards ==
- 2021 Advocacy All-Star Award. Presented by Association of Washington Cities (AWC).

== See also ==
- List of mayors of Tacoma, Washington
