= 2024 Washington Insurance Commissioner election =

- November 5, 2024

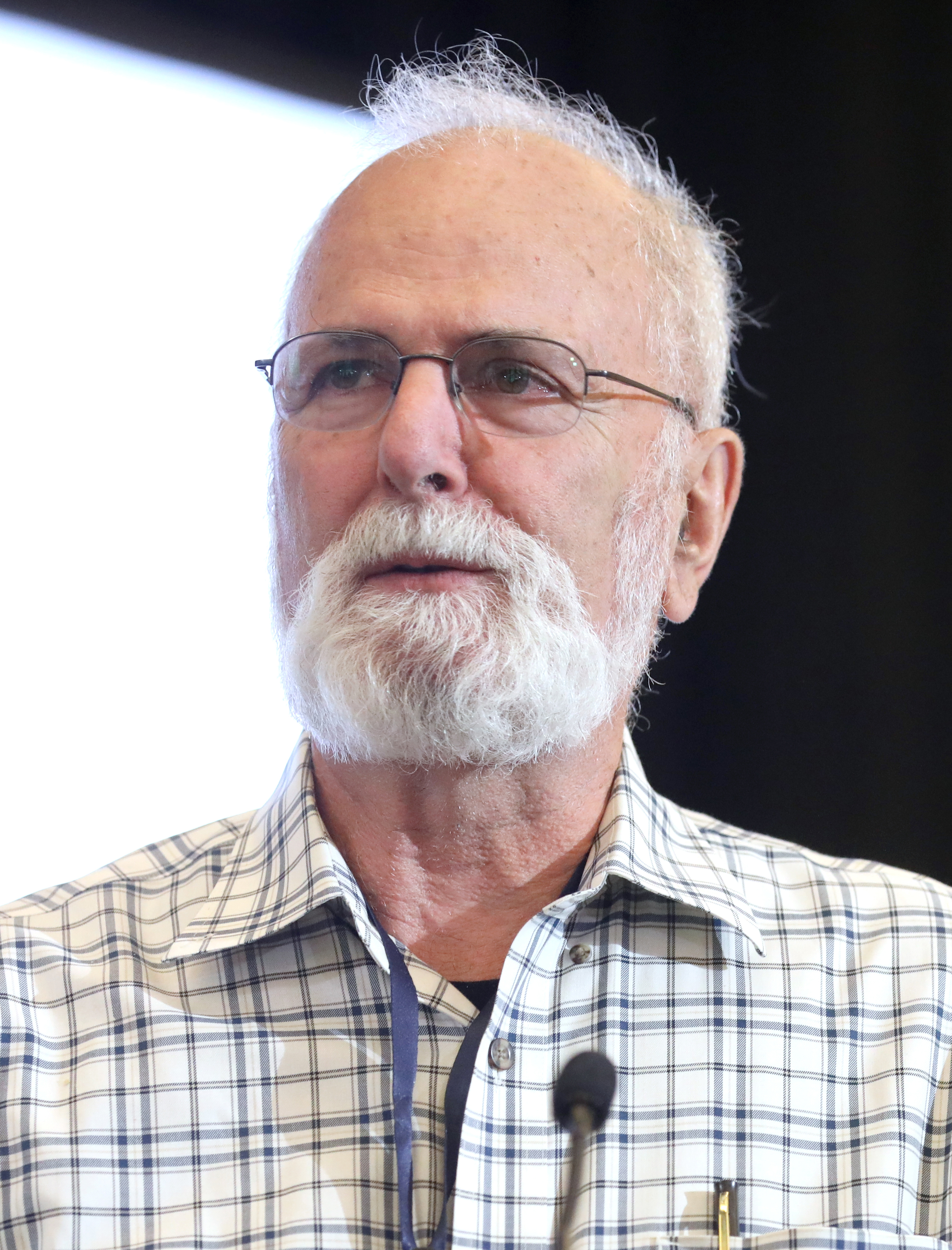
Candidate	Patty Kuderer	Phil Fortunato
Party	Democratic	Republican
Popular vote	2,091,969	1,598,032
Percentage	56.62%	43.26%
- Kuderer: 50–60% 60–70% 70–80% 80–90% Fortunato: 50–60% 60–70% 70–80%
Insurance Commissioner before election
Mike Kreidler
Democratic
Elected Insurance Commissioner
Patty Kuderer
Democratic

The 2024 Washington Insurance Commissioner election was held on November 5, 2024, to elect the next insurance commissioner of Washington, concurrently with the 2024 U.S. presidential election, as well as elections to the U.S. Senate and various state and local elections, including for U.S. House and governor of Washington. Incumbent Democratic Insurance Commissioner Mike Kreidler was eligible to seek re-election to a seventh term but instead chose to retire. Democratic state Senator Patty Kuderer won the election over Republican state Senator Phil Fortunato.

== Background ==
Incumbent Insurance Commissioner Mike Kreidler, first elected in 2000 and re-elected five times, most recently in 2020, retired.

== Primary election ==
Washington is one of two states that holds a top-two primary, meaning all candidates are listed on the same ballot regardless of party affiliation, and the top two advance to the general election.

=== Democratic candidates ===
==== Advanced to general ====
- Patty Kuderer, state senator

==== Eliminated in primary ====
- Bill Boyd, insurance broker
- Chris Chung, pharmacist
- John Pestinger, project manager at the Office of the Insurance Commissioner

==== Declined ====
- Mike Kreidler, incumbent insurance commissioner (2001–2025)

=== Republican candidates ===
==== Advanced to general ====
- Phil Fortunato, state senator

==== Eliminated in primary ====
- Justin Murta

=== Third-party and independent candidates ===
==== Eliminated in primary ====
- Jonathan Hendrix (Independent), insurance executive
- Tim Verzal (Independent), retired auto body mechanic

=== Endorsements ===
John Pestinger (D)

Newspapers

- The Seattle Times

=== Polling ===
Poll source	Date(s) administered	Sample size (Note: Key: A – all adults RV – registered voters LV – likely voters V – unclear)	Margin of error	Bill Boyd (D)	Chris Chung (D)	Phil Fortunato (R)	Jonathan Hendrix (NP)	Patty Kuderer (D)	Justin Murta (R)	John Pestinger (D)	Tim Verzal (NP)	Undecided
Public Policy Polling (D) (Note: Poll sponsored by the Northwest Progressive Institute)	July 24–25, 2024	581 (LV)	± 4.0%	3%	2%	13%	2%	8%	10%	5%	2%	56%

=== Results ===
County results Kuderer: 30–40%; 40–50%; 50–60%; 60–70%; Fortunato: 30–40%; 40–50%; 50–60%

Congressional district results Kuderer: 30–40%; 40–50%; 50–60%; 70–80%; Fortunato: 30–40%; 40–50%

Blanket primary election results
Party	Candidate	Votes	%
Democratic	Patty Kuderer	845,148	45.18
Republican	Phil Fortunato	533,560	28.52
Republican	Justin Murta	189,582	10.13
Democratic	John Pestinger	103,986	5.56
No party preference	Jonathan Hendrix	68,961	3.69
Democratic	Bill Boyd	57,387	3.07
Democratic	Chris D. Chung	54,469	2.91
No party preference	Tim Verzal	15,742	0.84
Write-in		1,738	0.09
Total votes		1,870,573	100.00

==== By county ====
Combined partisan vote by county Democratic: 50–60%; 70–80%; Republican: 40–50%; 50–60%; 60–70%; 70–80%

Combined partisan vote by congressional district Democratic: 40–50%; 50–60%; 60–70%; 80–90%; Republican: 40–50%; 50–60%

County results
County	Patty Kuderer Democratic		Phil Fortunato Republican		Justin Murta Republican		John Pestinger Democratic		Other candidates Various parties		Margin		Total votes
County	#	%	#	%	#	%	#	%	#	%	#	%	Total votes
Adams	369	15.78%	1,132	48.42%	497	21.26%	71	3.04%	269	11.51%	-635	-27.16%	2,338
Asotin	1,502	27.44%	2,181	39.84%	986	18.01%	143	2.61%	662	12.09%	-679	-12.40%	5,474
Benton	12,970	26.94%	19,411	40.31%	8,863	18.41%	1,909	3.96%	4,997	10.38%	-6,441	-13.38%	48,150
Chelan	6,481	31.63%	8,450	41.24%	2,783	13.58%	613	2.99%	2,164	10.56%	-1,969	-9.61%	20,491
Clallam	11,958	43.06%	8,041	28.95%	3,016	10.86%	1,604	5.78%	3,154	11.36%	3,917	14.10%	27,773
Clark	52,045	40.45%	43,832	34.06%	13,467	10.47%	6,178	4.80%	13,158	10.23%	8,213	6.38%	128,680
Columbia	198	16.45%	581	48.26%	239	19.85%	23	1.91%	163	13.54%	-342	-28.41%	1,204
Cowlitz	7,588	27.52%	11,154	40.46%	4,443	16.12%	750	2.72%	3,633	13.18%	-3,566	-12.94%	27,568
Douglas	2,308	22.43%	4,673	45.41%	1,881	18.28%	235	2.28%	1,193	11.59%	-2,365	-22.98%	10,290
Ferry	434	19.22%	1,065	47.17%	431	19.09%	60	2.66%	268	11.87%	-631	-27.95%	2,258
Franklin	3,205	23.41%	6,343	46.33%	2,320	16.95%	387	2.83%	1,435	10.48%	-3,138	-22.92%	13,690
Garfield	79	11.74%	365	54.23%	146	21.69%	10	1.49%	73	10.85%	-219	-32.54%	673
Grant	2,476	15.75%	7,636	48.58%	3,295	20.96%	282	1.79%	2,030	12.91%	-4,341	-27.62%	15,719
Grays Harbor	5,775	31.16%	6,151	33.19%	2,953	15.93%	576	3.11%	3,078	16.61%	-376	-2.03%	18,533
Island	11,735	42.20%	8,378	30.13%	2,751	9.89%	1,519	5.46%	3,426	12.32%	3,357	12.07%	27,809
Jefferson	9,467	62.21%	2,580	16.95%	908	5.97%	848	5.57%	1,414	9.29%	6,887	45.26%	15,217
King	317,912	60.18%	90,677	17.16%	26,677	5.05%	47,031	8.90%	46,005	8.71%	227,235	43.01%	528,302
Kitsap	37,687	46.91%	22,743	28.31%	6,794	8.46%	4,244	5.28%	8,879	11.05%	14,944	18.60%	80,347
Kittitas	2,888	26.40%	4,592	41.97%	1,713	15.66%	448	4.10%	1,299	11.87%	-1,704	-15.58%	10,940
Klickitat	2,430	33.89%	2,544	35.48%	1,218	16.99%	287	4.00%	692	9.65%	-114	-1.59%	7,171
Lewis	4,477	20.02%	10,224	45.72%	4,481	20.04%	481	2.15%	2,697	12.06%	-5,743	-25.68%	22,360
Lincoln	546	14.60%	1,825	48.78%	889	23.76%	86	2.30%	395	10.56%	-936	-25.02%	3,741
Mason	5,894	32.02%	6,383	34.68%	2,612	14.19%	739	4.02%	2,777	15.09%	-489	-2.66%	18,405
Okanogan	3,555	31.52%	4,145	36.76%	2,049	18.17%	320	2.84%	1,208	10.71%	-590	-5.23%	11,277
Pacific	2,487	32.66%	2,458	32.28%	1,188	15.60%	234	3.07%	1,247	16.38%	29	0.38%	7,614
Pend Oreille	978	22.67%	1,787	41.42%	888	20.58%	118	2.74%	543	12.59%	-809	-18.75%	4,314
Pierce	85,366	42.11%	67,094	33.09%	20,858	10.29%	8,055	3.97%	21,360	10.54%	18,272	9.01%	202,733
San Juan	4,623	63.05%	1,334	18.19%	292	3.98%	448	6.11%	635	8.66%	3,289	44.86%	7,332
Skagit	14,994	42.81%	10,130	28.92%	3,956	11.29%	1,915	5.47%	4,031	11.51%	4,864	13.89%	35,026
Skamania	1,270	33.07%	1,494	38.91%	556	14.48%	135	3.52%	385	10.03%	-224	-5.83%	3,840
Snohomish	87,035	45.15%	53,065	27.52%	19,004	9.86%	10,150	5.26%	23,535	12.21%	33,970	17.62%	192,789
Spokane	48,804	35.68%	49,743	36.37%	17,468	12.77%	4,485	3.28%	16,273	11.90%	-939	-0.69%	136,773
Stevens	2,945	19.39%	7,139	47.01%	3,020	19.89%	459	3.02%	1,624	10.69%	-4,119	-27.12%	15,187
Thurston	40,379	48.33%	20,591	24.65%	9,167	10.97%	4,265	5.11%	9,138	10.94%	19,788	23.69%	83,540
Wahkiakum	481	29.29%	585	35.63%	318	19.37%	38	2.31%	220	13.40%	-104	-6.33%	1,642
Walla Walla	4,161	29.93%	5,298	38.11%	2,063	14.84%	494	3.55%	1,885	13.56%	-1,137	-8.18%	13,901
Whatcom	34,487	50.75%	17,752	26.12%	7,078	10.42%	2,669	3.93%	5,967	8.78%	16,735	24.63%	67,953
Whitman	2,755	32.09%	2,887	33.62%	1,333	15.53%	325	3.79%	1,286	14.98%	-132	-1.54%	8,586
Yakima	10,404	25.42%	17,097	41.77%	6,981	17.05%	1,352	3.30%	5,099	12.46%	-6,693	-16.35%	40,933
Totals	845,148	45.18%	533,560	28.52%	189,582	10.13%	103,986	5.56%	198,297	10.60%	311,588	16.66%	1,870,573

==== By congressional district ====
District	Kuderer	Fortunato	Murta	Pestinger	Representative
1st	50%	25%	8%	6%	Suzan DelBene
2nd	48%	26%	10%	5%	Rick Larsen
3rd	35%	37%	13%	4%	Marie Gluesenkamp Perez
4th	25%	42%	18%	3%	Dan Newhouse
5th	32%	38%	14%	3%	Cathy McMorris Rodgers
6th	46%	28%	10%	5%	Derek Kilmer
7th	71%	8%	3%	11%	Pramila Jayapal
8th	39%	36%	10%	5%	Kim Schrier
9th	55%	20%	6%	7%	Adam Smith
10th	46%	28%	10%	5%	Marilyn Strickland

== General election ==
=== Post-primary endorsements ===
Patty Kuderer (D)

Newspapers

- The Seattle Times

=== Polling ===
Hypothetical polling

Patty Kuderer vs. Chris Corry

Poll source	Date(s) administered	Sample size	Margin of error	Patty Kuderer (D)	Chris Corry (R)	Undecided
Public Policy Polling (D)	May 15–16, 2023	615 (LV)	± 4.0%	39%	31%	29%

=== Results ===
2024 Washington Insurance Commissioner election
Party	Candidate	Votes	%	±%
Democratic	Patty Kuderer	2,091,969	56.62	–8.77
Republican	Phil Fortunato	1,598,032	43.26	+9.13
Write-in		4,430	0.12	–0.36
Total votes		3,694,431	100.00	N/A
Democratic hold				

==== By county ====
County	Patty Kuderer Democratic		Phil Fortunato Republican		Write-in Various		Margin		Total
County	#	%	#	%	#	%	#	%	Total
Adams	1,334	26.05%	3,768	73.58%	19	0.37%	-2,434	-47.53%	5,121
Asotin	3,864	35.69%	6,948	64.17%	16	0.15%	-3,084	-28.48%	10,828
Benton	35,459	36.96%	60,407	62.96%	85	0.09%	-24,948	-26.00%	95,951
Chelan	16,633	42.15%	22,793	57.77%	32	0.08%	-6,160	-15.61%	39,458
Clallam	23,851	52.22%	21,780	47.68%	45	0.10%	2,071	4.53%	45,676
Clark	132,987	51.81%	123,228	48.01%	482	0.19%	9,759	3.80%	256,697
Columbia	590	25.21%	1,745	74.57%	5	0.21%	-1,155	-49.36%	2,340
Cowlitz	21,995	39.11%	34,183	60.78%	59	0.10%	-12,188	-21.67%	56,237
Douglas	6,927	34.58%	13,079	65.29%	25	0.12%	-6,152	-30.71%	20,031
Ferry	1,259	31.91%	2,685	68.06%	1	0.03%	-1,426	-36.15%	3,945
Franklin	11,413	37.38%	19,099	62.55%	22	0.07%	-7,686	-25.17%	30,534
Garfield	300	23.27%	988	76.65%	1	0.08%	-688	-53.37%	1,289
Grant	10,252	29.82%	24,102	70.12%	20	0.06%	-13,850	-40.29%	34,374
Grays Harbor	16,373	45.74%	19,364	54.10%	55	0.15%	-2,991	-8.36%	35,792
Island	27,515	55.25%	22,196	44.57%	93	0.19%	5,319	10.68%	49,804
Jefferson	16,900	71.08%	6,862	28.86%	14	0.06%	10,038	42.22%	23,776
King	773,243	72.89%	286,357	27.00%	1,177	0.11%	486,886	45.90%	1,060,777
Kitsap	85,257	57.42%	63,074	42.48%	143	0.10%	22,183	14.94%	148,474
Kittitas	9,817	39.63%	14,921	60.24%	33	0.13%	-5,104	-20.60%	24,771
Klickitat	5,468	42.92%	7,255	56.95%	17	0.13%	-1,787	-14.03%	12,740
Lewis	13,567	31.77%	29,077	68.09%	60	0.14%	-15,510	-36.32%	42,704
Lincoln	1,516	22.14%	5,323	77.73%	9	0.13%	-3,807	-55.59%	6,848
Mason	16,089	46.33%	18,588	53.52%	51	0.15%	-2,499	-7.20%	34,728
Okanogan	8,093	41.06%	11,593	58.82%	24	0.12%	-3,500	-17.76%	19,710
Pacific	6,486	48.53%	6,854	51.28%	25	0.19%	-368	-2.75%	13,365
Pend Oreille	2,408	29.58%	5,719	70.24%	15	0.18%	-3,311	-40.67%	8,142
Pierce	219,159	52.52%	197,725	47.38%	416	0.10%	21,434	5.14%	417,300
San Juan	8,941	73.66%	3,180	26.20%	17	0.14%	5,761	47.46%	12,138
Skagit	34,199	52.12%	31,358	47.79%	56	0.09%	2,841	4.33%	65,613
Skamania	2,922	42.93%	3,874	56.92%	10	0.15%	-952	-13.99%	6,806
Snohomish	219,767	56.75%	167,015	43.13%	441	0.11%	52,752	13.62%	387,223
Spokane	123,170	45.10%	149,557	54.76%	386	0.14%	-26,387	-9.66%	273,113
Stevens	7,115	26.40%	19,790	73.44%	43	0.16%	-12,675	-47.04%	26,948
Thurston	90,149	58.05%	64,968	41.83%	190	0.12%	25,181	16.21%	155,307
Wahkiakum	1,134	39.38%	1,743	60.52%	3	0.10%	-609	-21.15%	2,880
Walla Walla	12,246	43.21%	16,069	56.70%	23	0.08%	-3,823	-13.49%	28,338
Whatcom	78,967	60.53%	51,382	39.39%	106	0.08%	27,585	21.15%	130,455
Whitman	9,706	51.25%	9,209	48.63%	22	0.12%	497	2.62%	18,937
Yakima	34,898	40.93%	50,174	58.85%	189	0.22%	-15,276	-17.92%	85,261
Totals	2,091,969	56.62%	1,598,032	43.26%	4,430	0.12%	493,937	13.37%	3,694,431

Counties that flipped from Democratic to Republican

- Chelan (largest city: Wenatchee)
- Franklin (largest city: Pasco)
- Grays Harbor (largest city: Aberdeen)
- Kittitas (largest city: Ellensburg)
- Klickitat (largest city: Goldendale)
- Mason (largest city: Shelton)
- Okanogan (largest city: Omak)
- Pacific (largest city: Raymond)
- Skamania (largest city: Carson)
- Spokane (largest city: Spokane)
- Walla Walla (largest city: Walla Walla)
- Yakima (largest city: Yakima)

==== By congressional district ====
Kuderer won six of ten congressional districts, with the remaining four going to Fortunato, including two that elected Democrats.

District	Kuderer	Fortunato	Representative
1st	61%	39%	Suzan DelBene
2nd	59%	40%	Rick Larsen
3rd	47%	53%	Marie Gluesenkamp Perez
4th	38%	62%	Dan Newhouse
5th	42%	58%	Cathy McMorris Rodgers (118th Congress)
5th	42%	58%	Michael Baumgartner (119th Congress)
6th	57%	43%	Derek Kilmer (118th Congress)
6th	57%	43%	Emily Randall (119th Congress)
7th	85%	15%	Pramila Jayapal
8th	49%	51%	Kim Schrier
9th	68%	31%	Adam Smith
10th	57%	43%	Marilyn Strickland

== Notes ==
Partisan clients
