= Harold G. Moss Bridge =

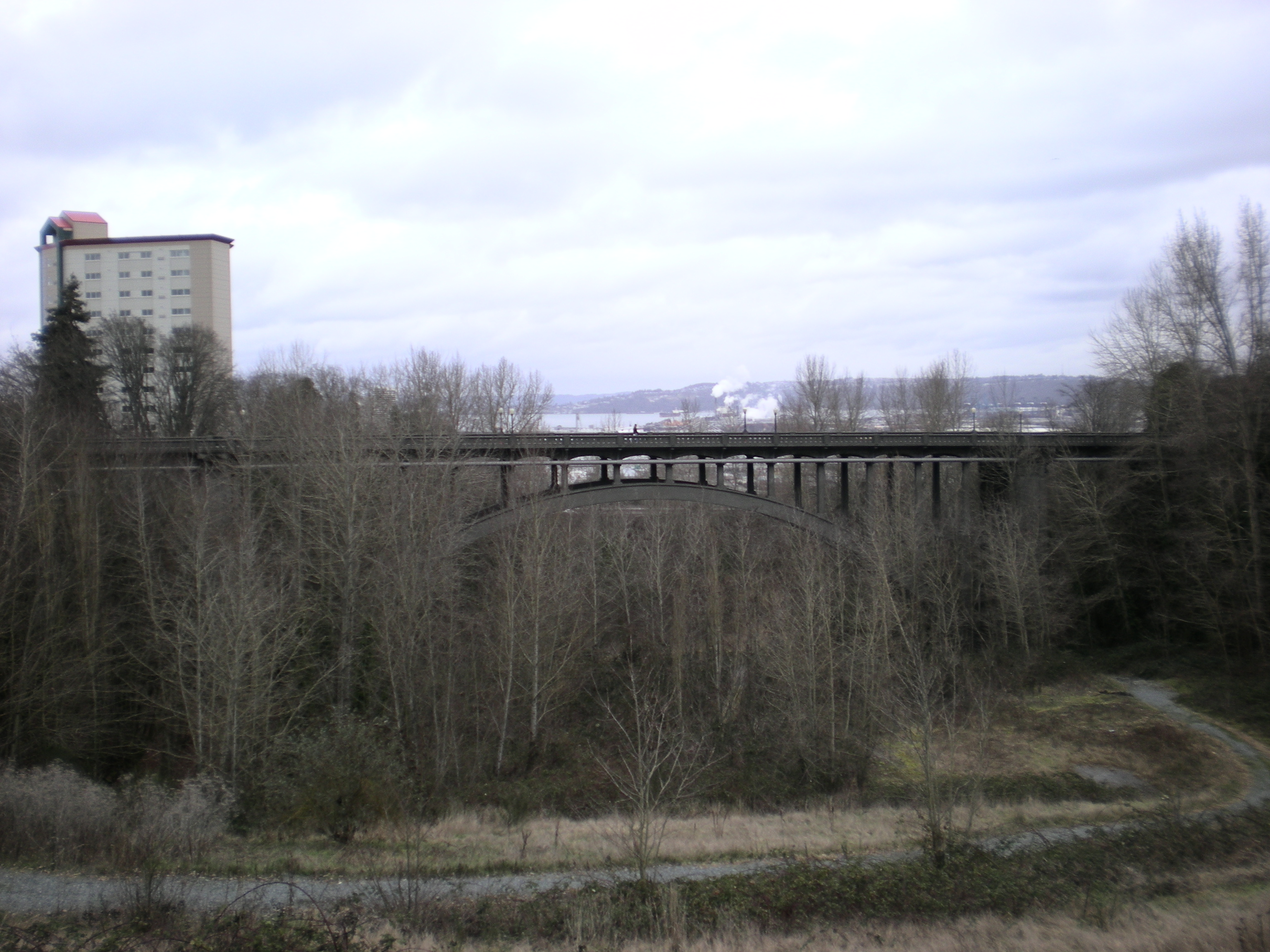
- Coordinates: 47°13′50.1″N 122°25′43.9″W
- Carries: East 34th Street
- Crosses: SR 7
- Locale: Tacoma, Washington
- Other name: East 34th Street Bridge
- Heritage status: NRHP

Characteristics
- Design: Open-spandrel arch
- Material: Concrete
- Total length: 485-foot (148 m)

History
- Architect: C.D. Forsbeck, MacRae
- Opened: October 21, 1936
- East 34th Street Bridge
- U.S. National Register of Historic Places
- MPS: Historic Bridges/Tunnels in Washington State TR
- NRHP reference No.: 82004279
- Added to NRHP: July 16, 1982

Location
- Interactive map of Harold G. Moss Bridge

The Harold G. Moss Bridge, originally the East 34th Street Bridge, is a concrete open-spandrel bridge in Tacoma, Washington. The bridge was opened on October 20, 1936, to replace a wood bridge that had previously spanned the gulch. The bridge is constructed of two rib arches, that are supported by 24-foot (7 m) support legs, with spandrel columns between the arches and the bridge's 485-foot (148 m) deck. The concrete railings on the deck are adorned with urn-shaped lampposts.

A freeway section of State Route 7, proposed as part of the Mountain Freeway, was constructed in the gulch and under the bridge in the 1960s. The bridge was added to the National Register of Historic Places in 1982. It was renamed for Harold G. Moss, the first Black mayor of Tacoma, on October 1, 2019. Moss was also the 34th mayor of the city.

== Sources ==
- Holstine, Craig; Hobbs, Richard (2005). Spanning Washington : historic highway bridges of the Evergreen State. Pullman, Wash: Washington State University Press. ISBN 0-87422-281-8. OCLC 58043209.
