= List of mayors of Tacoma, Washington =

The following is a list of mayors of the city of Tacoma, Washington state, United States.

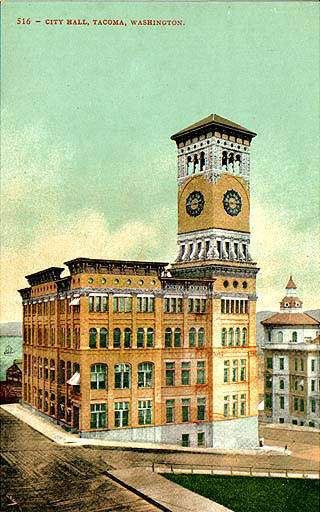
Former city hall in Tacoma; built in 1890s

- John W. Sprague, 1884
- Robert Jacob Weisbach, 1884–1885
- Jacob Mann, 1886
- Ira Town, 1887
- Henry Drum, 1888
- Samuel Adams Wheelright, 1889
- Stuart Rice, 1890
- George B. Kandle, 1891
- Herbert S. Huson, 1892–1893
- Edward S. Orr, 1894–1895, 1896, 1897
- Angelo Vance Fawcett, 1896, 1897; elected in 1898, 1909, 1914, 1922
- Johnson Nickeus, 1898
- Louis Campbell, elected in 1900
- George Wright, c.1904
- John Linck, c.1908
- William W. Seymour, elected in 1910
- Crocket M. Riddell, 1918–1922
- Melvin G. Tennent, elected in 1929, 1930
- James G. Newbegin, elected in 1929
- George Smitley, elected in 1934
- John C. Seigle, elected in 1938
- J.J. Kaufman, elected in 1939
- Harry P. Cain, 1940–1946
- C. Val Fawcett, elected in 1946
- John Anderson, elected in 1950, 1956
- Harold M. Tollefson, elected in 1954, 1962
- Ben Hanson, elected in 1958
- Albert Lawrence "Slim" Rasmussen, elected in 1967
- Gordon Johnston, elected in 1969
- Mike Parker, elected in 1977
- Doug Sutherland, 1982–1989
- Karen Vialle, elected in 1989
- Jack Hyde, elected in 1993
- Harold Moss, 1994–1996
- Brian Ebersole, 1996–2001
- Mike Crowley, elected in 2001
- Bill Baarsma, 2002–2010
- Marilyn Strickland, 2010–2018
- Victoria Woodards, 2018–2026
- Anders Ibsen, 2026–present

== See also ==
- Tacoma history
- City government in Washington (state)
