= Bill Baarsma =

American politician

37th Mayor of Tacoma
- In office January 9, 2002 – January 5, 2010
- Preceded by: Mike Crowley (interim)
- Succeeded by: Marilyn Strickland

Personal details
- Born: Tacoma, Washington, U.S.
- Party: Democratic
- Education: University of Puget Sound (BA); George Washington University (MA)

Bill Baarsma is an American politician and academic who served as the 37th mayor of Tacoma, Washington from 2001 to 2009.

== Early life and education ==
Baarsma was born and raised in Tacoma, Washington, and earned a bachelor's degree in political science from the University of Puget Sound, where he was a member of Sigma Nu fraternity. Baarsma was also selected for the Scottish Rite Masonic Fellowship for graduate study at George Washington University, where he earned his master's degree and doctorate in public administration.

== Career ==
While living in Washington, D.C., Baarsma worked on the staff of Senator Henry M. Jackson and was chosen for a coveted graduate student assistantship with the United States Department of Housing and Urban Development.

Prior to his election as mayor, Baarsma taught business and public administration at the University of Puget Sound and served on the Tacoma City Council from 1992 to 1999.

He has also served on two Tacoma charter review commissions, and the city's 1980 redistricting committee. He was a member of the Mayors Against Illegal Guns Coalition, a bi-partisan group with a stated goal of "making the public safer by getting illegal guns off the streets." The coalition was co-chaired by then-Boston Mayor Thomas Menino and then-New York City Mayor Michael Bloomberg.

== Personal life ==
Baarsma lives in the North Tacoma, Washington with his wife, Carol.

== See also ==
- List of mayors of Tacoma, Washington
