= Marilyn Strickland =

American politician (born 1962)

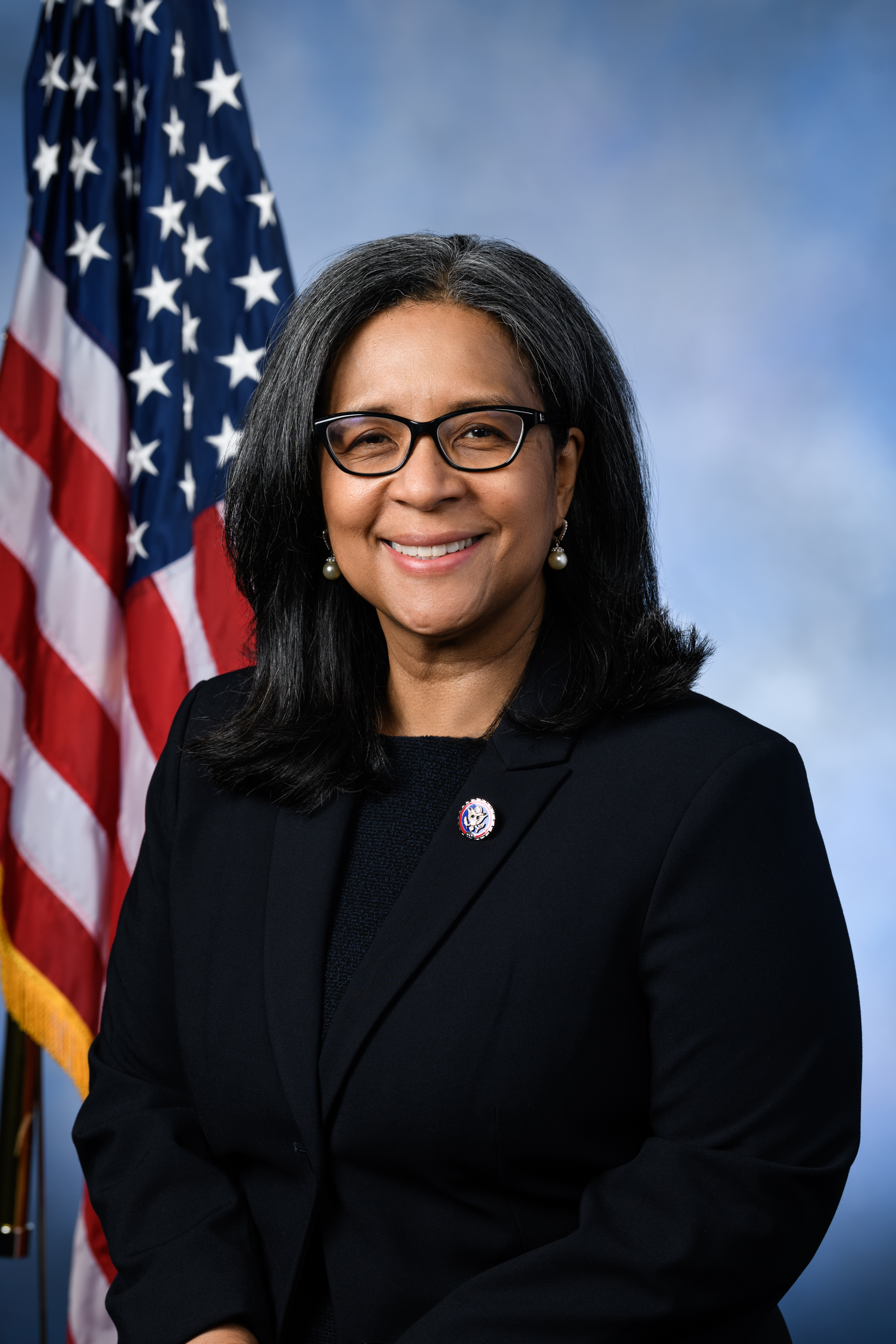
- Official portrait, 2021

Member of the U.S. House of Representatives from Washington's 10th district
- Incumbent
- Assumed office January 3, 2021
- Preceded by: Denny Heck

38th Mayor of Tacoma
- In office January 5, 2010 – January 2, 2018
- Preceded by: Bill Baarsma
- Succeeded by: Victoria Woodards

Personal details
- Born: September 25, 1962 (age 64) Seoul, South Korea
- Party: Democratic
- Spouse: Patrick Erwin
- Education: University of Washington (BA); Clark Atlanta University (MBA)
- Website: House website Campaign website
- Strickland's voice Strickland supporting her amendment to the National Apprenticeship Act of 2021. Recorded February 5, 2021

Korean name
- Hangul: 김순자
- RR: Gim Sunja
- MR: Kim Sunja

Marilyn Strickland (Korean: 김순자; born September 25, 1962) is an American politician who is the U.S. representative from Washington's 10th congressional district. The district is based in the state capital of Olympia, and also includes much of eastern Tacoma. A member of the Democratic Party, Strickland took office on January 3, 2021. She previously served as the 38th mayor of Tacoma from 2010 to 2018.

She is the first member of the United States Congress of both Korean and African-American heritage, and the first African-American member elected from Washington. Strickland is also one of the first three Korean-American women elected to Congress, beginning her term on the same day as Republicans Young Kim and Michelle Park Steel.

== Early life and education ==
Strickland was born on September 25, 1962, in Seoul, South Korea, the daughter of Inmin Kim, a Korean, and Willie Strickland, an African-American serviceman. She and her family moved to Tacoma, Washington, in 1967 after her father was stationed at Fort Lewis. She was raised in Tacoma's South End neighborhood and attended Mount Tahoma High School. Strickland earned a Bachelor of Arts degree in business from the University of Washington and a Master of Business Administration from Clark Atlanta University. She is married to Patrick Erwin.

== Career ==
=== Business ===
After graduating from the University of Washington, Strickland took a job at Northern Life Insurance doing clerical work. At a luncheon, she was introduced to Seattle Mayor Norm Rice, who suggested that she further her education.

After earning a Master of Business Administration from Clark Atlanta University, Strickland joined Starbucks as a manager of its online business. She then moved on to help launch the City of Tacoma's public broadband cable service Click!, working with an advertisement agency to help grow public support.

=== Tacoma City Council and mayoralty ===
After years in the private sector, Strickland was elected to the Tacoma City Council. She served as a council member for two years before being selected to serve as mayor from 2010 to 2018.

Strickland was the first Asian-born elected mayor of Tacoma, as well as the first African-American woman in that office. She used connections in China and Vietnam to draw foreign investors, culminating in Chinese president Xi Jinping's visit to Tacoma.

In May 2010, the Tacoma Board of Ethics sanctioned Strickland for accepting frequent flyer miles from a local businessman for an official trip to Asia. She accepted the sanction and returned the value of the frequent flyer miles to the businessman.

=== Seattle Metropolitan Chamber of Commerce ===
After her mayoralty, Strickland was approached by the pro-business Seattle Metropolitan Chamber of Commerce to serve as its president. During her tenure as president of the chamber of commerce, she opposed the Seattle head tax.

Strickland has been described as a political moderate or centrist.

== U.S. House of Representatives ==
=== Elections ===
==== 2020 ====
Strickland left the Chamber in early 2020, declaring her candidacy for Washington's 10th congressional district in the 2020 election, a seat being vacated by incumbent Denny Heck. She was endorsed by several politicians and newspapers. In the August 4 jungle primary, Strickland placed first in a field of 19 candidates. She and the second-place finisher, Democratic state representative Beth Doglio, advanced to the November general election.

In the November general election, Strickland defeated Doglio. She assumed office on January 3, 2021. As a member of the 117th United States Congress, Strickland is the Pacific Northwest's first Black U.S. representative and one of the first three Korean-American congresswomen, along with Michelle Steel and Young Kim, who began their terms on the same day. She wore a traditional hanbok to her swearing-in ceremony to honor her mother.

=== Tenure ===
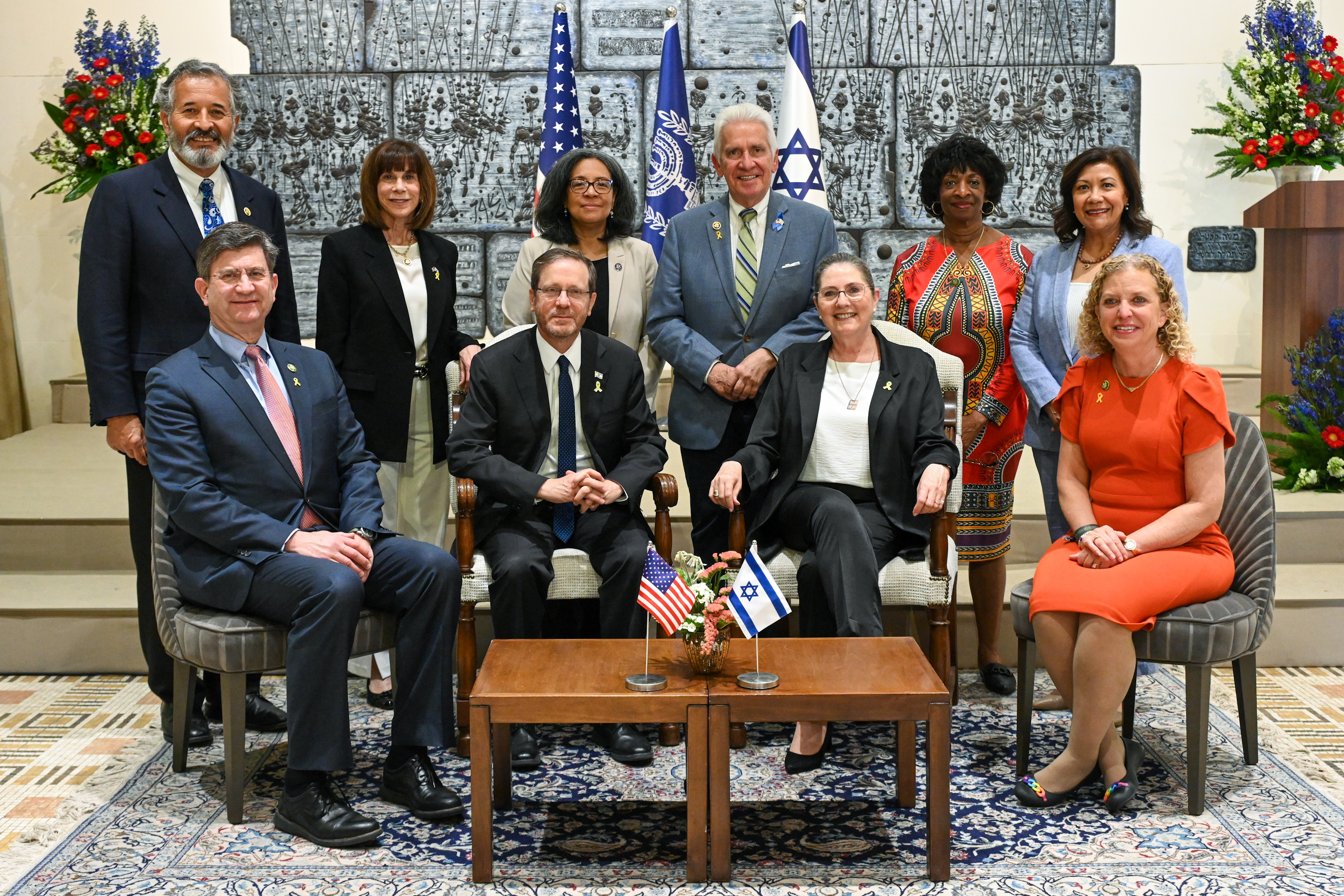
Strickland and other members of the US Congress with Israeli president Isaac Herzog in Jerusalem, Israel, March 28, 2024

Strickland voted with President Joe Biden's stated position 100% of the time in the 117th Congress, according to a FiveThirtyEight analysis.

In April 2023, Strickland introduced the BAH Restoration Act, which would increase the Basic Allowance for Housing paid to members of the armed forces serving in the United States. The bill was referred to the House Armed Services Committee but did not advance out of committee during the 118th Congress. She continued advocating for higher housing allowances during consideration of the fiscal year 2025 defense authorization bill, identifying housing affordability as a major concern for personnel at Joint Base Lewis–McChord.

In November 2023, Strickland joined a bipartisan group of lawmakers in introducing the Build More Housing Near Transit Act. The proposal would give transit projects higher ratings in the federal Capital Investment Grants application process when local governments adopted policies encouraging housing construction near transit routes, such as reducing parking requirements or allowing more multifamily housing.

In December 2024, Strickland was elected secretary of the Congressional Black Caucus for the 119th Congress, after serving as its whip during the 118th Congress.

In April 2024, Strickland met with a delegation from Israel, led by House Minority Leader Hakeem Jeffries.

On November 10, 2026, Strickland missed the House vote on the impeachment of Pete Hegseth as Secretary of Defense. Strickland claimed that that she was stuck behind a motorcade and missed the vote by one minute.

=== Foreign Trips ===
- Israel: March 24-31, 2024; group trip sponsored by American Israel Education Foundation, affiliated with AIPAC.

=== Committee assignments ===
- United States House Committee on Armed Services
- Committee on Transportation and Infrastructure

=== Caucus memberships ===
- Black Maternal Health Caucus
- Congressional Asian Pacific American Caucus
- Congressional Black Caucus
- Congressional Equality Caucus
- New Democrat Coalition
- Rare Disease Caucus

== Personal life ==
Strickland is a Protestant.

== See also ==
- List of African-American United States representatives
- List of Asian Americans and Pacific Islands Americans in the United States Congress
- List of foreign-born United States politicians
- List of Korean Americans
- List of mayors of Tacoma, Washington
- List of United States representatives from Washington
- Women in the United States House of Representatives

Political offices
Preceded by Bill Baarsma	Mayor of Tacoma; 2010–2018	Succeeded by Victoria Woodards
U.S. House of Representatives
Preceded by Denny Heck	Member of the U.S. House of Representatives from Washington's 10th congressional district 2021–present	Incumbent
U.S. order of precedence (ceremonial)
Preceded by Victoria Spartz	United States representatives by seniority 276th	Succeeded by Ritchie Torres
