= Harold Moss =

American politician (1929–2020)

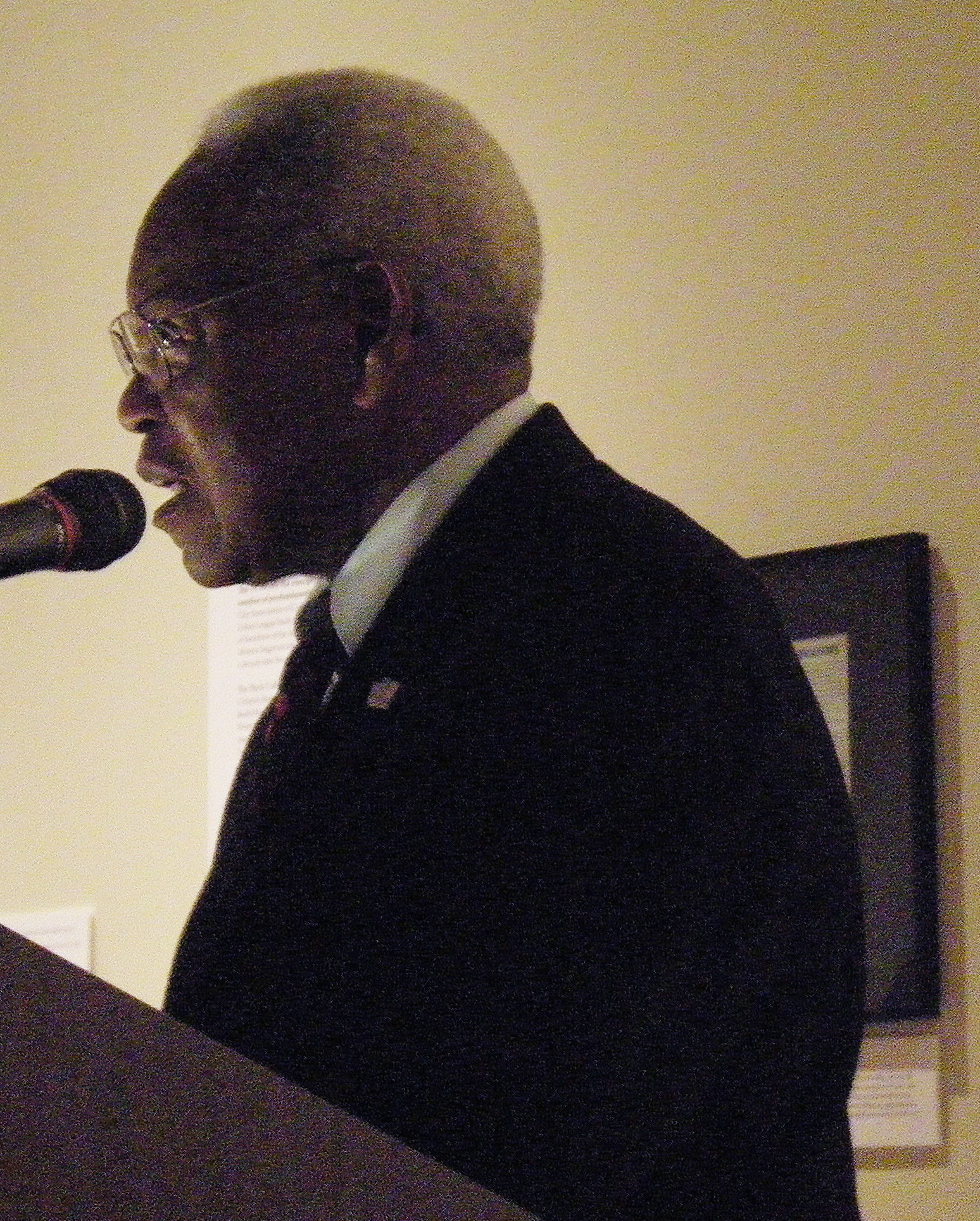

Member of the Pierce County Council from the 4th District
- In office January 1, 1997 – January 1, 2005
- Preceded by: Dennis P. Flanagan
- Succeeded by: Timothy M. Farrell

34th Mayor of Tacoma
- In office January 1, 1994 – January 1, 1996
- Preceded by: Jack Hyde
- Succeeded by: Brian Ebersole

Personal details
- Born: Harold Gene Moss; October 1, 1929 Gilmer, Texas, U.S.
- Died: September 21, 2020 (aged 90) Tacoma, Washington, U.S.
- Education: Lewis College of Business

Military service
- Branch/service: United States Army
- Battles/wars: Korean War

Harold Gene Moss (October 1, 1929 – September 21, 2020) was an American politician and businessman who was the 34th mayor of Tacoma, Washington. He was the first African American member of the city's council, its first African American mayor and the first African American member of the Pierce County Council. His wife, Bil Moss, was on the Tacoma City Council.

== Early life and education ==
Moss was born in Gilmer, Texas, on October 1, 1929, and his family later soon resettled in Detroit during the Great Migration. Moss attended the Lewis College of Business before arriving in Tacoma during the Korean War as a member of the United States National Guard.

== Career ==
He first became politically active in the 1950s as a member of the local branch of the National Association for the Advancement of Colored People (NAACP). He served two terms as branch president, served on Tacoma's first Human Relations Commission (later Human Rights Commission), and in 1968, Moss helped create the Tacoma Urban League and played a key role in securing public funding for its Urban Services Center.

Moss worked as a dental technician and also operated a small business, Northwest Porcelain Studios. He left the business when he was hired by the Tacoma Chamber of Commerce and the Tacoma Area Coalition in spring 1968 to run the Central Area Employment Office, soliciting jobs for disadvantaged Tacoma-area residents. He entered electoral politics in 1969 as an unsuccessful candidate for the Tacoma City Council. A year later, five council members were recalled and Moss was appointed to a seat, which he took on October 13, 1970. He was elected to a full term in 1971, remaining a full-time employee of the Urban League throughout this period. The Urban League's national executive director, Vernon Jordan, asked Moss to step down from his elected position in 1975 to avoid compromising the League's non-profit status.

By 1983, Moss was no longer affiliated with the Urban League. That year, he ran unsuccessfully for city council. In February 1987, he was appointed to fill a council vacancy, ran that fall for a full term, won, and was reelected in 1991. In January 1994, Tacoma mayor Jack Hyde suffered a fatal heart attack nearly at the start of his term. Moss, who was deputy mayor at the time, was appointed mayor and served for two years. During his administration, Tacoma enacted a youth curfew law. Because the mayor is considered part of the city council, term limits prevented him from running as an incumbent in the 1995 election. During this period, Moss also worked as a civil-rights manager for the Washington State Department of Transportation.

Moss was subsequently elected to the Pierce County Council and was a member from January 1, 1997, to December 31, 2004, including as council chair from 2002 to 2004, at which time he announced his retirement. He ran unsuccessfully for mayor of Tacoma in 2001, and came out of retirement in 2007 to launch an unsuccessful run for Tacoma City Council against the incumbent, Spiro Manthou.

The East 34th Street Bridge was renamed for Moss in October 2019, as he was the city's 34th mayor.

== Personal life ==
In a September 1978 domestic argument, Moss shot his son in the shoulder with a .38-caliber revolver. No charges were ever pressed, and the two later reconciled.

Moss died in Tacoma on September 21, 2020, ten days before his 91st birthday.

== See also ==
- List of mayors of Tacoma, Washington
- List of first African-American mayors
