= Wilkeson Arch =

- U.S. National Register of Historic Places
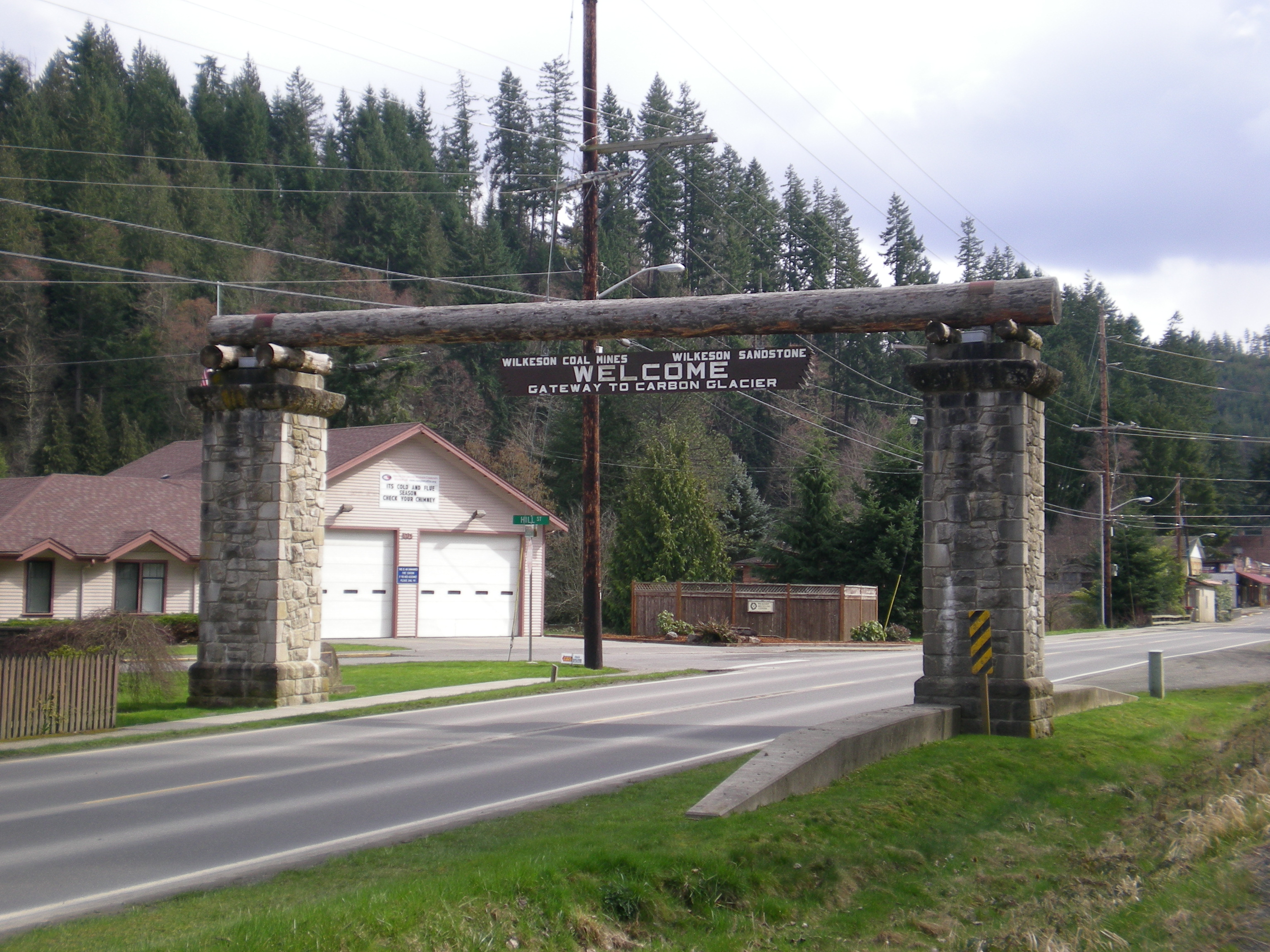
- The relocated arch in 2008

- Location within Washington (state)
- Location: WA 165, Church St. and Brierhill Blvd., Wilkeson, Washington
- Coordinates: 47°6′38″N 122°3′3″W
- Area: less than one acre
- Built: 1925
- Architectural style: Rustic
- NRHP reference No.: 00000973
- Added to NRHP: August 10, 2000

Wilkeson Arch is a monumental gateway structure at the west entrance to Wilkeson, Washington. The stone and timber structure was built in 1925 by the Wilkeson Booster Club, at a cost of $2000. It is similar in design to the Chinook Pass, Nisqually and White River entrance arches in nearby Mount Rainier National Park, deriving its style from the National Park Service Rustic style prevailing in the national park structures of the time. The arch was intended to promote tourism and the local products, coal and sandstone.

== Description ==
The Wilkeson Arch is located on Washington State Route 165, standing across the road. The arch comprises two squared pillars of local sandstone with simple stone bases and capitals, topped by log cribbing supporting a single fir (originally cedar) log spanning the road between the pillars. The lintel supports a sign that from the entrance side reads "WILKESON COAL MINES - WILKESON SANDSTONE" and "GATEWAY TO THE CARBON GLACIER." The exit side of the sign reads "TACOMA 30 MILES - SEATTLE 50 MILES and "REMEMBER WILKESON." The pillars are 6 feet (1.8 m) square and 25 feet (7.6 m) tall.

== History ==
The arch was originally located on Route 165 at Brierhill Boulevard, but was damaged during the February 28, 2001 Nisqually earthquake. The structure, rebuilt in 2004 and dedicated in 2009, is now located on 165 near Hill Street, several blocks to the south, in a move that provoked local controversy. Its span has been widened by two feet.

The Wilkeson Arch was placed on the National Register of Historic Places on August 10, 2000.
