= Tacoma City Council =

- City Council

Type
- Type: City Council of City of Tacoma
- Houses: Unicameral

Leadership
- Mayor: Anders Ibsen

Structure
- Seats: 9
- Committees: List: Committee of the Whole Community Vitality and Safety Economic Development Government Performance and Finance Infrastructure, Planning, and Sustainability

Elections
- Last election: November 4, 2025

Meeting place
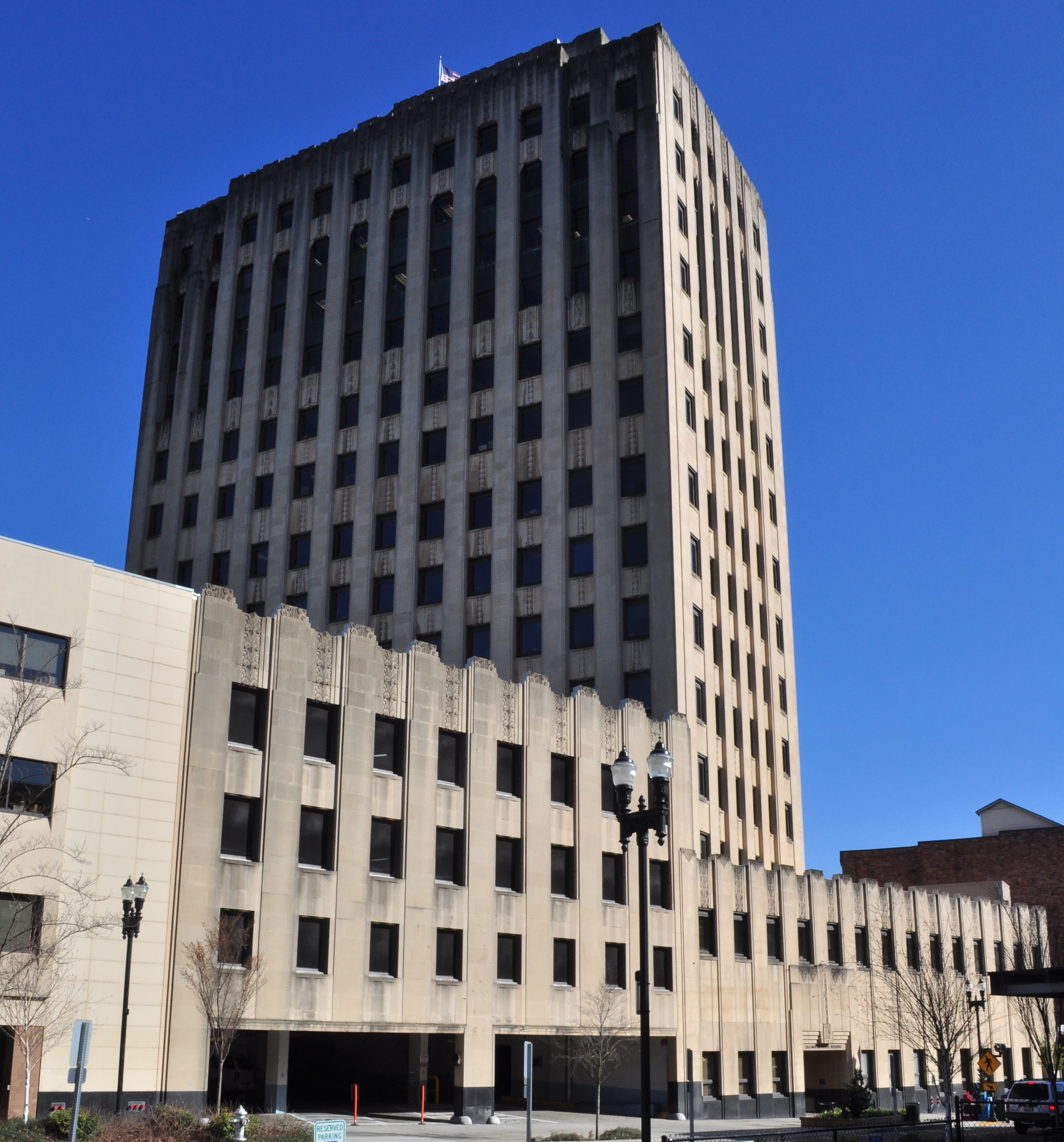
- Tacoma Municipal Building; 747 Market Street, Tacoma, WA 98402

Website
- Official website

The Tacoma City Council is the major governing body in the city of Tacoma, Washington. The city council has one mayor and eight council members, who are elected to serve four-year terms. The city council has the power to write the laws of the city, budget the city's finances, and make other decisions for the city. The city council holds meetings on the first floor of the Tacoma Municipal Building.

== History ==
The current system for the Tacoma City Council was established in 1952. Prior to this date, Tacoma's government consisted of elected commissioners, who frequently plagued the city with corruption. Voters chose to replace the old system with a city council (including the mayor) to pass laws and a city manager to enforce them, also known as the Council–manager system. The council–manager government remains Tacoma's governmental structure today.

=== Public meeting controversy ===
Under the Open Public Meetings Act of 1971, Washington state law requires Tacoma City Council meetings to be open to the public. In 1999, Cheryl Miller sued the council for voting down her application to serve on the Tacoma City Planning Commission during executive session, during which doors were closed to the public. The Washington Supreme Court agreed with Miller. In Miller vs. City of Tacoma, the court ruled that in executive session, the council could deliberate and "evaluate" nominees, but a vote choosing between nominees overstepped the boundaries of an evaluation. Even though the vote was not a formal one, it still violated the public's right to transparency. Miller was compensated only for her attorney fees and court costs as the Supreme Court ruled that the council members did not break the law intentionally.

This issue of public transparency has not been fully resolved. Similar situations have occurred where the Tacoma City Council allegedly held informal votes on candidates in secret, such as a 2010 executive session to fill two vacancies on the council. The city settled a lawsuit challenging the 2010 discussion.

== Current members ==
The current members of the Tacoma City Council as of August 2026 are listed below.

- Anders Ibsen, Mayor
- John Hines, Position 1
- Sarah Rumbaugh, Position 2
- Jamika Scott, Position 3
- Sandesh Sadalge, Position 4
- Joe Bushnell, Position 5
- Latasha Palmer, Position 6
- Olgy Diaz, Position 7
- Kristina Walker, Position 8

== Notable former members ==
- Marilyn Strickland
- Bill Baarsma
- Doug Sutherland
- Harold Moss
